= 15th Canadian Comedy Awards =

Festival and awards ceremony for works of 2013

- Date: 14 September 2014
- Location: Ottawa Little Theatre; Ottawa, Ontario
- Country: Canada
- Presented by: Canadian Comedy Foundation for Excellence
- Hosted by: Tom Green

Highlights
- Most wins: Television: Nathan for You (3); Film: Sex After Kids (2); Internet: But I'm Chris Jericho! (2); Person: Nathan Fielder (3)
- Most nominations: Television: Satisfaction (7); Film: Sex After Kids (7); Internet: But I'm Chris Jericho! (5); Person: Nathan Fielder (4)
- Website: www.canadiancomedyawards.org

The 15th Canadian Comedy Awards, presented by the Canadian Comedy Foundation for Excellence (CCFE), honoured the best live, television, film, and Internet comedy of 2013. The awards ceremony was hosted by Tom Green and held at the Ottawa Little Theatre on 14 September 2014.

Canadian Comedy Awards, also known as Beavers, were awarded in 30 categories. Winners in 7 categories were chosen by the public through an online poll and others were chosen by members of industry organizations. The awards ceremony was part of the Canadian Comedy Awards Festival which ran from 10 to 14 September and included over 20 comedy events.

The film Sex After Kids and TV series Satisfaction led with seven nominations each. The big winner was Nathan Fielder who won three Beavers for writing, directing, and performing in TV series Nathan for You. Jeremy Lalonde won two Beavers for Sex After Kids. Also winning two Beavers were web series But I'm Chris Jericho! and sketch group Peter 'n Chris. Dave Foley won Canadian Comedy Person of the Year.

== Festival and ceremony ==
The 15th Canadian Comedy Awards (CCA) was held in Ottawa, Ontario. Hamilton and Niagara Falls, Ontario, had also been approached to host the awards if they would become home to a new Canadian Comedy Hall of Fame, but the cities declined.

The awards ceremony was hosted by Tom Green and held on 14 September 2014 at the Ottawa Little Theatre at the conclusion of the Canadian Comedy Awards Festival, which ran from 10 to 14 September. The festival included comedy showcases by many of the 150 nominees at venues including the Ottawa Little Theatre, Yuk Yuk's, and Absolute Comedy. School groups were invited to daytime workshops at the Market Media Mall in ByWard Market, which had interactive exhibits including a standup comedy stage and the television set from The Great White North of SCTV.

== Winners and nominees ==
Between 160 and 180 jurors chose the top-five nominees. Over 15,000 members of the public voted online for winners in seven categories. The others were decided by industry members. Voting was open from July to 15 August.

Web series, which had been included with television awards in the previous year's ceremony, were split into separate categories for this year's awards. This resulted in 30 award categories and over 150 nominees, the most for any awards ceremony as of 2018.

Winners are listed first and highlighted in boldface:

=== Multimedia ===
Canadian Comedy Person of the Year	Best Feature Film
**Dave Foley**; Mike Wilmot; Mark Little; Nathan Fielder; Lauren Ash	**Lawrence & Holloman**; Bank$tas; Old Stock; Stag; That Burning Feeling
Best Direction in a Feature	Best Writing in a Feature
**Jeremy Lalonde** – **Sex After Kids**; Alec Toller – Play The Film; James Genn – Old Stock; Jason James – That Burning Feeling; Matthew Kowalchuk – Lawrence & Holloman	**Jeremy Lalonde** – **Sex After Kids**; Dane Clark – Old Stock; Daniel Arnold and Matthew Kowalchuk – Lawrence & Holloman; Kelly McCormack – Play the Film; Nick Citton – That Burning Feeling
Best Male Performance in a Feature	Best Female Performance in a Feature
**Jon Dore** – **Stag**; Ben Cotton – Lawrence & Holloman; Ennis Esmer – Sex After Kids; Jay Brazeau – Sex After Kids; Paulo Costanzo – That Burning Feeling	**Ingrid Haas** – **That Burning Feeling**; Amanda Brugel – Sex After Kids; Christina Sicoli – After Party; Shannon Beckner – Sex After Kids; Zoie Palmer – Sex After Kids
Best Audio Show or Series	Best Audio Clip
**Stop Podcasting Yourself**; Illusionoid; The Irrelevant Show; This Is That; We're Doing It	**Bee Circus**; Sci Fi; XBOX One ad written by your dad
Best Comedy Special or Short
**Torturous** (Note: Torturous is a short film by Angus Swantee and Craig Gunn.); Japan; S is for Bird; The Golden Ticket; Wanda

=== Live ===
Best Taped Live Performance	Best Breakout Artist
**Darrin Rose** – **Just for Laughs: All Access**; Darren Frost – Emotional Terrorism; Nile Séguin – Just For Laughs	**Ken Hall**; Amanda Brooke Perrin; Christina Walkinshaw; Darcy Michael; Matt O'Brien
Best Male Stand-up	Best Female Stand-up
**Chris Locke**; Darren Frost; David Pryde; Graham Kay; Ron Sparks	**DeAnne Smith**; Christina Walkinshaw; Jen Grant; Rebecca Kohler; Steph Tolev
Best Male Improviser	Best Female Improviser
**Adam Cawley**; Alastair Forbes; Mark Meer; Rob Norman; Taz VanRassel	**Kayla Lorette**; Ashley Botting; Becky Johnson; Caitlin Howden; Kirsten Rasmussen
Best Sketch Troupe	Best Improv Troupe
**Peter 'n Chris**; Baram & Snieckus; Hot Thespian Action; Ladystache; The Templeton Philharmonic (Note: The Tempelton Philharmonic are the comic duo of Gwynne Phillips and Briana Templeton.); Tony Ho	**The Sufferettes**; Bonspiel! Theatre; Cast of Die-Nasty; Rapid Fire Senior Ensemble; The Sunday Service
Best One Person Show	Best Comedic Play, Revue or Series
**Weaksauce** (Note: Weaksauce is a one-person show of Sam Mullins.); Adopt This!; Hold Mommy's Cigarette; Polly Polly; Roller Derby Saved My Soul (Note: Roller Derby Saved My Soul is the one-person show of Nancy Kenny.)	**Peter n' Chris Explore Their Bodies**; 2-Man No-Show-3D; George A. Romero's Night of the Living Dead Live; Spank! The Fifty Shades Parody; We Can Be Heroes
Best Variety Act
**Morro and Jasp**; Shirley Gnome; Wes Borg; David Merry; Bob Cates

=== Television ===
Best Male Performance in a TV Series	Best Female Performance in a TV Series
**Nathan Fielder** – **Nathan for You**; Darrin Rose – Mr. D; Mark O'Brien – Republic of Doyle; Pat Thornton – Satisfaction; Ryan Belleville – Satisfaction	**Nikki Payne** – **Satisfaction**; Cathy Jones – This Hour Has 22 Minutes XXI; Julia Voth – Package Deal; Liz Best – Meet the Family; Susan Kent – This Hour Has 22 Minutes XXI
Best Direction in a TV Series or Special	Best Writing in a TV Series or Special
**Nathan Fielder** – **Nathan for You** episode 103 "**Gas Station/Caricature Artist**"; Derek Harvie – Meet the Family episode 205 "Germaphobe"; Jason Priestley – Satisfaction episode 112 "Save the Date"; Keith Samples – Satisfaction episode 110 "Penis Face Cat Funeral"; Vivieno Caldinelli and Michael Lewis – This Hour Has 22 Minutes season 21 episode 7	**Nathan Fielder** – **Nathan for You** episode 103 "**Gas Station/Caricature Artist**"; Adam Cawley, Rob Baker, Pat Smith and Rob Norman – Guidance – episode 5 "Parental Advisory"; Mark Critch – Satisfaction episode 109 "The Pot and The Pirate"; Matt Doyle, Derek Harvie, Evany Rosen, Ron Sparks – Meet the Family episode 102 "Sugar Daddy"; Peter McBain, Mark Critch, Shaun Majumder, Mike Allison, Bob Kerr, Greg Thomey, Jon Blair, Sonya Bell, Abdul Butt, Matt Kippen, Tim Polley, Heidi Brander, Adam Christie, Cathy Jones, Dean Jenkinson, Ron Sparks – This Hour Has 22 Minutes season 21 episode 5
Best TV Show
**This Hour Has 22 Minutes**, season 21; Less Than Kind; Meet the Family; Satisfaction; This Hour Has 22 Minutes – season 21

=== Internet ===
Best Male Performance in a Web Series	Best Female Performance in a Web Series
**Scott Thompson** – **But I'm Chris Jericho!**; Brendan Halloran – Space Janitors; David Milchard – Convos with My 2 Year Old; Ken Hall – Straight Man; Pat Thornton – Space Janitors	**Kayla Lorette** – **Everyone's Famous**; Debra DiGiovanni – Straight Man; Evany Rosen – Space Janitors; Hannah Spear – Versus Valerie; Laurie Elliott – But I'm Chris Jericho!
Best Direction in a Web Series	Best Writing in a Web Series
**Mike Fly** and **Simon Fraser** – **Versus Valerie** episode 10 "**The Dark Night vs. Valerie**"; Andrew Ainsworth and Andrew Kines – Straight Man episode 6; Geoff Lapaire – Space Janitors episode 205 "Pyus Dunes"; Mike Fly – But I'm Chris Jericho! episode 104 "Acting Class"; Neil Every – The Hungry Games Part 1 episode 2.1 "Fools For Hire"	**Bob Kerr** – **But I'm Chris Jericho!** episode 104 "**Acting Class**"; Geoff Lapaire and Andy Hull - Space Janitors: Episode 203, "Life Debt: Jared Keeso and Jordan Beirnes - Letterkenny Problems: "Hockey Players"; David Tichauer and Ned Petrie - Straight Man: Episode 6; Stephanie Kaliner - Versus Valerie: "Sexy Nerd Girl Versus Valerie"
Best Web Series
**Convos with My 2 Year Old**; But I'm Chris Jericho!; Straight Man; The Casting Room; Versus Valerie

=== Special awards ===
Dave Broadfoot Award	Phil Hartman Award
**Ron James**	**Kenny Robinson**
Roger Abbott Award
**Kyra Williams**; **Gary Rideout Jr.**

== Multiple wins ==
The following people, shows, films, etc. received multiple awards

Awards	Person or work
3	Nathan Fielder
3	Nathan For You
2	But I'm Chris Jericho!
2	Jeremy Lalonde / Sex After Kids

== Multiple nominations ==
The following people, shows, films, etc. received multiple nominations

Nominations	Person or work
7	Satisfaction
7	Sex After Kids
5	But I'm Chris Jericho!
5	That Burning Feeling
5	This Hour Has 22 Minutes
4	Meet the Family
4	Nathan Fielder
4	Space Janitors
4	Straight Man
3	Nathan For You
3	Old Stock
2	Cathy Jones
2	Convos with My 2 Year Old
2	Jeremy Lalonde
2	Mark Critch
2	Versus Valerie
