= 18th Canadian Comedy Awards =

Festival and awards ceremony for works of 2016–17

- Date: 2018
- Location: Toronto, Ontario
- Country: Canada
- Presented by: Canadian Comedy Foundation for Excellence

Highlights
- Most wins: Television: Kim's Convenience (2); Film: Don't Talk to Irene (2); Internet: You Got Trumped (4); Person: Ron Sparks (2)
- Most nominations: Television: Kim's Convenience (13); Film: Another WolfCop (5); Internet: Best Before (4); Person: Ron Sparks (2)
- Website: www.canadiancomedyawards.org

The 18th Canadian Comedy Awards, presented by the Canadian Comedy Foundation for Excellence (CCFE), honoured the best live, television, film, and Internet comedy from 1 July 2016 to 31 December 2017.

Canadian Comedy Awards, also known as Beavers, were awarded in 22 categories determined by votes from the public and industry members.

TV series Kim's Convenience led with a record thirteen nominations, including all five nominees in the Best TV Direction category, followed by the feature Another WolfCop with five. Web series You Got Trumped was the big winner, receiving three Beavers from its four nominations.

== Reorganization and awards ==
The Canadian Comedy Awards (CCA) award excellence in Canadian comedy at home and abroad. Due to a delay in the previous awards season, these awards also covered an 18-month period, from 1 July 2016 to 31 December 2017, in order to return to annual eligibility. This edition of the awards consolidated the number of categories to 22, largely by combining separate male and female performance categories.

Industry members chose the nominees in each category. Each industry member could declare one category as their field of "expertise", giving their nomination and vote in that single category three times the normal weight. After nominations closed, voting was opened for the top five nominees in each category. 13 categories were open to public voting and 9 were exclusively decided by industry members.

== Winners and nominees ==
Winners are listed first and highlighted in boldface:

=== Multimedia ===
| Comedic Artist of the Year | Best Short |
|---|---|
| **Mike MacDonald**; Samantha Bee; Mark Little; Barry Julien; Aurora Browne | **Day Players**; Baby Shower; Fowl Play; Grocery Store Action Movie; Here's Video Game News; Jeremy and Margot Make a Baby |
| Best Feature | Best Performance in a Feature |
| **Don't Talk to Irene**; Another WolfCop; Entanglement; Filth City | **Pat Thornton** – **Filth City**; Amy Matysio – Another WolfCop; Michelle McLeod – Don't Talk to Irene; Thomas Middleditch – Entanglement; Yannick Bisson – Another WolfCop |
| Best Direction in a Feature | Best Writing in a Feature |
| **Peter Benson** – **Marrying The Family**; Andy King – Filth City; Jason James – Entanglement; Lowell Dean – Another WolfCop; Pat Mills – Don't Talk to Irene | **Pat Mills** – **Don't Talk to Irene**; Andy King and Danny Polishchuck – Filth City; Jason Filiatrualt – Entanglement; Lowell Dean – Another WolfCop |
| Best Audio Show or Series | Best Comedy Album |
| **Taggart & Torrens Podcast**; Alex Wood Quits Everything; Comic Jenius; Killed to Death; Vest of Friends Podcast | **Andrew Chapman** – **Oh Yeah This**; Garrett Jamieson & Sprattacus – Superdrunkgnome; Marty Topps – Wetter Than Wet; Rob Pue – Puegilist; Shirley Gnome – Taking It Up The Notch; Spencer Streichert – Winning By Default |

=== Live ===
| Best Live Production | Best Taped Live Performance |
|---|---|
| **The Adventures of Tom Shadow**; Yes, Android; Party Today Panic Tomorrow; Everything Is Great Again; 32 Short Sketches About Bees | **Crush Improv** – **Crush Ten: Crush Improv's Tenth Anniversary Special**; Todd Graham – Just for Laughs: All Access Gala; Ron James – The High Road; Laurie Elliott – Just For Laughs Gala; David Pryde – Just for Laughs 375 |
| Best Live Ensemble | Best Standup Comic |
| **Cast of The Adventures of Tom Shadow**; The Sunday Service Improv Troupe; Sex T-Rex; Cast of Party Today Panic Tomorrow; Cast of Everything Is Great Again | **Martha Chaves**; Rob Pue; Kate Davis; Graham Clark; Gavin Stephens |
| Best Variety Act | Best Breakout Artist |
| **Bob Cates**; Morro and Jasp; Marty Topps; Garrett Jamieson & Sprattacus; Shirley Gnome | **Chantel Marostica**; Clare McConnell; Nick Nemeroff; Rachelle Elie; Ryan Dillon |

=== Television ===
| Best TV Show | Best Performance in a TV Series |
|---|---|
| **Baroness von Sketch Show**; Guilt Free Zone season 2; Kim's Convenience; The Beaverton, season 2; Tiny Plastic Men, season 4 | **Emma Hunter** – **The Beaverton**; Andrea Bang – Kim's Convenience; Andrew Phung – Kim's Convenience; Paul Sun-Hyung Lee – Kim's Convenience; Rodrigo Fernandez-Stoll – Kim's Convenience |
| Best Direction in a TV Series or Special | Best Writing in a TV Series or Special |
| **Aleysa Young** – **Kim's Convenience**, "**Sneak Attack**"; Dawn Wilkinson – Kim's Convenience, "Cardboard Jung"; Peter Wellington – Kim's Convenience, "Appa's First Text"; Renuka Jeyapalan – Kim's Convenience, "Janet's Boyfriend"; Siobhan Devine – Kim's Convenience, "Good Neighbours" | **Anita Kapila, Matt Kippen** and **Kevin White** – **Kim's Convenience**, "**Handy Graduation**"; Darrell Dennis – Guilt Free Zone season 2, episode 2011 "Cops & Mobsters"; Ins Choi and Kevin White – Kim's Convenience, "House Guest"; Matt Kippen – Kim's Convenience, "Business Award"; Melissa DiMarco, Adam Pal, Rebecca Taylor, Richard Church, Samuel Smith, Samantha Wyss, Adam Vet – Out There with Melissa DiMarco, episode 723 "The Pursuit of Hoppyness" |

=== Internet ===
| Best Web Series | Best Performance in a Web Series |
|---|---|
| **You Got Trumped**; Best Before; Princess Sparkly Butt & the Hot Dog Kid; Space Riders: Division Earth – season 2; Terrific Women; The Amazing Gayl Pile – season 3 | **Ron Sparks** – **You Got Trumped**; Adrienne Fish – Best Before; Amy Matysio – Epic Studios; Anand Rajaram – Fare Trade; Christina Sicoli – Small Cop; Kayla Lorette – Space Riders: Division Earth, season 2 |
| Best Direction in a Web Series | Best Writing in a Web Series |
| **Kelly Fanson** – **Best Before**, episode 21 "**Loud Sex**"; Ally Pankiw – Terrific Women, episode 2; Brandon Lane – Princess Sparkly Butt & the Hot Dog Kid, episode 3 "I Need Space"; Daniel Tahmizian – The DG Special, season 1, episode 11; Derek Harvie – You Got Trumped, S01E01 | **Derek Harvie, Jeff Kassel** and **Ron Sparks** – **You Got Trumped**, S01E03; Bob Kerr – But I'm Chris Jericho!, episode 203 "Peace Out"; Brandon Lane – Princess Sparkly Butt & the Hot Dog Kid, episode 3 "I Need Space"; Christina Sicoli – Small Cop, "The Negotiator"; Kate Davis and Kelly Fanson – Best Before, episode 21 "Loud Sex" |

== Multiple wins ==
The following people, shows, films, etc. received multiple awards

| Awards | Person or work |
|---|---|
| 3 | Kim's Convenience |
| 3 | You Got Trumped |
| 2 | Don't Talk to Irene |
| 2 | Ron Sparks |

== Multiple nominations ==
The following people, shows, films, etc. received multiple nominations

| Awards | Person or work |
|---|---|
| 13 | Kim's Convenience |
| 5 | Another WolfCop |
| 4 | Best Before |
| 4 | Don't Talk to Irene |
| 4 | Entanglement |
| 4 | Filth City |
| 4 | You Got Trumped |
| 3 | Princess Sparkly Butt & the Hot Dog Kid |
| 2 | Guilt Free Zone |
| 2 | Kelly Fanson |
| 2 | Ron Sparks |
| 2 | Small Cop |
| 2 | Space Riders: Division Earth |
| 2 | Terrific Women |
