= 16th Canadian Comedy Awards =

Awards ceremony for works of 2014

- Date: 13 September 2015
- Location: Toronto Reference Library; Toronto, Ontario
- Country: Canada
- Presented by: Canadian Comedy Foundation for Excellence

Highlights
- Most wins: Television: This Hour Has 22 Minutes (4); Film: Dirty Singles (2); Internet: Space Riders: Division Earth (4); Person: K. Trevor Wilson (2)
- Most nominations: Television: This Hour Has 22 Minutes (6); Film: Corner Gas: The Movie (9); Internet: Space Riders: Division Earth (7); Person: K. Trevor Wilson (3)
- Website: www.canadiancomedyawards.org

The 16th Canadian Comedy Awards, presented by the Canadian Comedy Foundation for Excellence (CCFE), honoured the best live, television, film, and Internet comedy of 2014. The awards were presented in Toronto, Ontario, on 13 September 2015. Canadian Comedy Awards, also known as Beavers, were awarded in 29 categories.

The film Corner Gas: The Movie led with nine nominations, followed by web series Space Riders: Division Earth with seven and This Hour Has 22 Minutes with six. Space Riders: Division Earth and This Hour Has 22 Minutes each won four Beavers.

== Ceremony ==
After spending two years in Ottawa, Ontario, the Canadian Comedy Awards (CCA) returned to Toronto for the 16th awards. The awards were presented at the Bram and Bluma Appel Salon of the Toronto Reference Library on 13 September 2015.

== Winners and nominees ==
Nominees were announced on 30 June 2015 and public voting was open through July to 15 August. Winners are listed first and highlighted in boldface:

=== Multimedia ===
Canadian Comedy Person of the Year	Best Feature Film
**Samantha Bee**; Jay Baruchel; Scott Thompson; Sugar Sammy; Will Arnett	**How to Be Deadly**; Big News from Grand Rock; Corner Gas: The Movie; I Put a Hit on You; Pretend We're Kissing
Best Direction in a Feature	Best Writing in a Feature
**Mars Horodyski** – **Ben's at Home**; David Storey – Corner Gas: The Movie; Lowell Dean – WolfCop; Nik Sexton – How to Be Deadly; Peter Benson – What an Idiot	**Peter Benson** – **What An Idiot**; Brent Butt, Andrew Carr, Andrew Wreggitt – Corner Gas: The Movie; Daniel Perlmutter – Big News from Grand Rock; Matt Sadowski – Pretend We're Kissing
Best Male Performance in a Feature	Best Female Performance in a Feature
**Ennis Esmer** – **Dirty Singles**; Brent Butt – Corner Gas: The Movie; Eric Peterson – Corner Gas: The Movie; Jonathan Cherry – WolfCop; Lorne Cardinal – Corner Gas: The Movie	**Lauren Ash** – **Dirty Singles**; Gabrielle Miller – Corner Gas: The Movie; Meredith MacNeill – Big News from Grand Rock; Nancy Robertson – Corner Gas: The Movie; Tara Spencer-Nairn – Corner Gas: The Movie
Best Audio Show or Series	Best Comedy Special or Short
**The Debaters: William Shatner (Eric Peterson & Sean Cullen)**; Comic Stripped w/Ben Miner; Party of Four; The Humble and Fred Show; The Irrelevant Show	**Job Interview**; A Mile in these Hooves; Beep Beep; Erik The Pillager; Retro Video Arcade – Hot Sister

=== Live ===
Best Taped Live Performance	Best Breakout Artist
**K. Trevor Wilson** – **Sexcop Firepenis**; Darrin Rose – The Late Late Show with Craig Ferguson; Rob Pue – Winnipeg Comedy Festival; Ron James – The Big Picture; Steve Patterson – This is Not Debatable	**D.J. Demers**; Aisha Alfa; Allana Reoch; K. Trevor Wilson; Rob Norman
Best Male Stand-up	Best Female Stand-up
**K. Trevor Wilson**; David Pryde; Jeff McEnery; Rob Pue; Ron Sparks	**Steph Tolev**; Julia Hladkowicz; Julie Kim; Keesha Brownie; Zabrina Chevannes
Best Male Improviser	Best Female Improviser
**Kris Siddiqi**; Isaac Kessler; Mark Meer; Rob Norman; Taz VanRassel	**Kirsten Rasmussen**; Ashley Botting; Becky Johnson; Diana Frances; Hayley Kellett; Sarah Hillier
Best Sketch Troupe	Best Improv Troupe
**Get Some**; Peter N Chris; The Second City; Tony Ho; Uncalled For	**The Sufferettes**; Bonspiel! Theatre; Cast of Die-Nasty; K$M; The Sunday Service
Best One Person Show	Best Comedic Play, Revue or Series
**The Untitled Sam Mullins Project**, **Sam Mullins**; Don't Tell My Dad; God Is A Scottish Drag Queen II; James Mullinger is Living the Canadian Dream; This Is Not Debatable	The Second City: **Sixteen Scandals**; A Twisted Christmas Carol; Golden Ages: The Fully Improvised Musical; Mump and Smoot in ANYTHING; The Pageant
Best Variety Act
**Mump and Smoot**; Bob Cates; Marty Topps; Mixed Company; Shirley Gnome

=== Television ===
Best Male Performance in a TV Series	Best Female Performance in a TV Series
**Shaun Majumder** – **This Hour Has 22 Minutes** XXII; Darrin Rose – Mr. D; Gerry Dee – Mr. D; Jonathan Torrens – Mr. D; Terry Barna – Meet the Family	**Leslie Seiler** – **24 Hour Rental**; Cathy Jones – This Hour Has 22 Minutes XXII; Ellie Harvie – Some Assembly Required; Jill Morrison – Package Deal; Susan Kent – This Hour Has 22 Minutes XXII
Best Direction in a TV Series or Special	Best Writing in a TV Series or Special
**Vivieno Caldinelli, Michael Lewis** – **This Hour Has 22 Minutes** XXII – episode 4; Cameron Wyllie – The D.J. Demers Show, "Backup Job"; Derek Harvie – Meet the Family; Henry Sarwer-Foner – Rick Mercer Report, episode 16; Mark O'Brien – Republic of Doyle, "No Rest for the Convicted"	**Mark Critch, Mike Allison, Bob Kerr, Jon Blair, Sonya Bell, Tim Polley, Heidi Brander, Adam Christie, Pat Dussault, Cathy Jones, Dean Jenkinson, Ron Sparks, Scott Vrooman, Jeremy Woodcock** – **This Hour Has 22 Minutes**, season 22 episode 4; Chris Craddock – Tiny Plastic Men season 2; Gerry Dee – Mr. D, "Donor Dinner"; Matt Doyle, Derek Harvie, Hannah Hogan, Brian Peco and Ron Sparks – Meet the Family; Ryan Long, Jarek Hardy, Max Off, Jesse Wilks, Christopher Walton, Jarrett Campbell and Danny Polishchuk – Ryan Long is Challenged
Best TV Show
**This Hour Has 22 Minutes** XXII; Meet the Family; Ryan Long is Challenged; Tiny Plastic Men season 2; Too Much Information

=== Internet ===
Best Male Performance in a Web Series	Best Female Performance in a Web Series
**Mark Little** – **Space Riders: Division Earth**; Dan Beirne – Space Riders: Division Earth; Darrell Faria – The Chai-T Video Mixtape; David Milchard – Convos with My 2 Year Old; Sandy Jobin-Bevans – Bill & Sons Towing	**Kayla Lorette** – **Space Riders: Division Earth**; Amy Matysio – Space Riders: Division Earth; Evany Rosen – Space Janitors; Jayne Eastwood – Bill & Sons Towing; Precious Chong – Sex and the Single Parent
Best Direction in a Web Series	Best Writing in a Web Series
**Jordan Canning** – **Space Riders: Division Earth**; David Milchard – Convos with My 2 Year Old; Geoff Lapaire – Space Janitors; John Borbely – Blimey! An Englishman In Atlantic Canada; Vivieno Caldinelli – Bill & Sons Towing	**Stephanie Gorin, Naomi Snieckus** and **Ron James** – **The Casting Room**, "Have Some Method in Your Creative Madness"; Brendan Halloran, Andy Hull, Geoff Lapaire and Evany Rosen – Space Janitors; Dan Beirne and Mark Little – Space Riders: Division Earth; Katie Nolan and Lindsay Tapscott – HOT MOM episode 5; Mark De Angelis – Bill & Sons Towing
Best Web Series
**Space Riders: Division Earth**; Bill & Sons Towing; Sex and the Single Parent; The Amazing Gayl Pile; The Urbane Explorer

=== Special awards ===
Phil Hartman Award
- **Joe Bodolai**

== Multiple wins ==
The following people, shows, films, etc. received multiple awards

Awards	Person or work
4	This Hour Has 22 Minutes
4	Space Riders: Division Earth
2	Dirty Singles
2	K. Trevor Wilson

== Multiple nominations ==
The following people, shows, films, etc. received multiple nominations

Awards	Person or work
9	Corner Gas: The Movie
7	Space Riders: Division Earth
6	This Hour Has 22 Minutes
5	Bill & Sons Towing
4	Meet the Family
4	Mr. D
3	K. Trevor Wilson
3	Ron Sparks
3	Space Janitors
2	Big News from Grand Rock
2	Brent Butt
2	Cathy Jones
2	Convos with My 2 Year Old
2	Dirty Singles
2	Evany Rosen
2	Gerry Dee
2	How to Be Deadly
2	Mark Little
2	Peter Benson / What An Idiot
2	Sex and the Single Parent
2	Tiny Plastic Men
2	WolfCop
