= Rodrigo Fernandez-Stoll =

Canadian actor (born 1983)

- Born: 1983 (age 42–43)
- Occupations: Actor, comedian

Rodrigo Fernandez-Stoll (born 1983) is a Canadian actor and comedian. He was a dual Canadian Screen Award nominee at the 8th Canadian Screen Awards in 2020, receiving nods for Best Lead Performance in a Web Program or Series for Save Me and Best Supporting Performance in a Web Program or Series for How to Buy a Baby. He was also nominated for Performance in a guest role in a comedy series in Son of a Critch at the Canadian Screen Awards in 2023 and 2025.

He had a recurring role in Kim's Convenience as Enrique, a regular customer of the convenience store, and has a regular supporting role in Detention Adventure.

His short film Job Interview won the Canadian Comedy Award for Best Comedy Special or Short Film at the 16th Canadian Comedy Awards in 2015. In 2020 he released an album titled Fog and Lasers 2 that featured funny songs performed with some of the best musicians and comics in Canada, including Rich Knox, Ava Val, Feurd Ian Robertson Moore, Jill Harris, Chris Robinson, Alex St. Kitts, Anh Phung, Morgan Waters and Nick Rose.

== Filmography ==
=== Film ===
Year	Title	Role	Notes
2010	Ruby Skye P.I.: The Spam Scam	Griffin's Father	
2011	Bounty Hunters	Peter	
2012	Sick: Survive the Night	Jackson	
2012	Havana 57	Luis	
2014	Pretend We're Kissing	Host	
2015	Room	Reporter #2	
2017	Filth City	Waiter	
2018	Little Italy	Ramon	
2018	The Lie	Band Member	
2018	The Holiday Calendar	Fernando	
2019	The Kindness of Strangers	Laundry Worker #1	
2019	Scary Stories to Tell in the Dark	Drive-in Manager	
2019	Let It Snow	Stallholder	
2021	The Exchange	Kevin	
2021	V/H/S/94	Spivey	Segment "Holy Hell"
2022	Ivy	Jeffrey	
2022	Luckiest Girl Alive	Williams-Sonoma Salesman	
2022	I Like Movies	Yuppie Man	
2023	BlackBerry	Jack Manishen	
2023	Priscilla	Alan 'Hog Ears'	
2024	Paying for It	Mandi's Husband	
2026	Tight Lettuce (Tissé serré)	Francisco	
2026	Ice Cream Man	Mr. Hamlin	

=== Television ===
Year	Title	Role	Notes
2009	Urban Legends	Dr. Rodriguez	Episode: "Welcome Home?"
2010	Bloodletting & Miraculous Cures	Airport Soldier	Episode: "All Souls"
2011	Goodbye Sara Hennessey	Rod	Episode: "Sara is not a Gay Man Enough"
2011	Outlaw Bikers	Kevin Sylvester	Episode: "The Last Spartan"
2011	Cold Blood	Cord's Friend	Episode: "Shot in the Park"
2013	OutsideIN	Chef	Television film
2013–2018	Air Crash Investigation	Various roles	4 episodes
2015	After Birth	Kevin	Television film
2016	Calm Down Paul	Todd	2 episodes
2016	Beauty & the Beast	Sammy	Episode: "Something's Gotta Give"
2016	Killjoys	Jr. Techie	Episode: "Dutch and the Real Girl"
2016–2021	Kim's Convenience	Enrique	13 episodes
2016–2022	True Dating Stories	Various roles	3 episodes
2017	Terrific Women	Frank	3 episodes
2017	My Kitchen Can Be Anything	Rodrigo	Episode: "My Kitchen is a Bar"
2017	Note to Self	Boyfriend	Episode: "Independence"
2017	Fare Trade	Mo	Episode: "In Search of: A Super Miracle"
2017	The Beaverton	Kevin Paulus	Episode #2.42
2017	This Art Works!	Various roles	5 episodes
2018	Falling Water	Apartment Manager	Episode: "Nothing Personal"
2018	Earthling House Huntress	Gorm	Episode: "Galaxa 314"
2018	Imposters	Broker (Dan)	Episode: "Maybe/Definitely"
2018	Killer High	DJ	Television film
2018–2020	Baroness von Sketch Show	Various roles	11 episodes
2019	Winter Love Story	Julian	Television film
2019	Northern Rescue	Alan	3 episodes
2019	Pete Samcras	Soldier	Episode: "Epic Hero Speech"
2019	Save Me	Mike	Episode: "Boyfriend Material"
2019	First Person	Sean	Episode: "My Wife's Affair? It's Kind of a Funny Story"
2019	Frankie Drake Mysteries	Exterminator	Episode: "Life on the Line"
2019	Carter	Don Tovey	Episode: "Harley Insisted On Wearing Pants"
2020	New Eden	Ryan (Morning Host 2)	Episode: "A Whole Lotta Buzz"
2020	Burden of Truth	Alejandro	Episode: "Crisis of Faith"
2020	Hudson & Rex	Chef Gregory Ramon	Episode: "Finger Foodie"
2020	Workin' Moms	Oboe Teacher	Episode: "Charade"
2020	Transplant	Javy Romero	Episode: "Birth and Rebirth"
2020	Decoys	Dennis	6 episodes
2020	Grand Army	Mr. Blumberg	2 episodes
2021	Second Jen	Dudley	Episode: "Vive Le Conflict Resolution"
2021	Pretty Hard Cases	Mateo Dominguez	Episode: "Feathers"
2021	Ginny & Georgia	Anthony	2 episodes
2021	Nurses	Antonio	Episode: "Ghosts"
2021	Departure	Father Emilio	2 episodes
2021	Star Trek: Discovery	Nalas	Episode: "Kobayashi Maru"
2021–2025	Ghosts	Todd	4 episodes
2022	The Kings of Napa	Shawn	3 episodes
2022–2025	Son of a Critch	Father Garcia	12 episodes
2023	What We Do in the Shadows	Trevor	2 episodes
2024	Earth Abides	Jorge	4 episodes
