= The Great Canadian Pottery Throw Down =

Canadian reality television series

- Based on: The Great Pottery Throw Down by Love Productions
- Directed by: Darrell Faria
- Presented by: Jennifer Robertson
- Composer: Orin Issacs
- Country of origin: Canada
- Original language: English
- No. of series: 1
- No. of episodes: 8

Production
- Executive producers: Jamie Brown; Seth Rogen; Evan Goldberg; James Weaver; Alex McAtee; Stephanie Fast
- Producer: Elvira Kurt
- Production companies: Point Grey Pictures; Frantic Films

Original release
- Network: CBC Television
- Release: February 8 – April 4, 2024

The Great Canadian Pottery Throw Down is a Canadian reality competition television series, premiered on CBC Television on February 8, 2024. Adapted from the British series The Great Pottery Throw Down, the series is a pottery competition to find Canada's best potter.

The show is hosted by Jennifer Robertson, with Brendan Tang and Natalie Waddell as judges. Actor Seth Rogen, himself an amateur potter, appeared as a guest judge, as well as being an executive producer of the series. The show was filmed in Granville Island, an area of Vancouver with an industrial past and currently occupied by many artists, at the former site of Emily Carr University of Art and Design.

On the finale, which aired 4 April 2024, Jen Sonnenberg was declared the winner. The Great Canadian Pottery Throw Down was not renewed for another season.

== Contestants ==
Potter	Age	Hometown
Kiefer Floreal	27	Winnipeg, MB
Alice Gibson	21	Penticton, BC
Thomas Haskell	35	Toronto, ON
Susan Johnston	67	Surrey, BC
Renu Mathew	49	Olds, AB
Andrew McCullough	32	Fredericton, NB
Jen Sonnenberg	39	Stonewall, MB
Jackie Talmey-Lennon	39	Vancouver, BC
Elsa Valiñas	43	Fredericton, NB
Michael Wood	35	Salisbury, NB

== Episodes ==
No.	Title	Directed by	Original release date	Prod. code
1	"There's No Place Like Home"	Darrell Faria & Jeremy Marc Poitras	February 8, 2024	101
2	"Game On"	Darrell Faria & David Russell	February 15, 2024	102
3	"Abstract Yourself"	Darrell Faria & Jeremy Marc Poitras	February 22, 2024	103
4	"Let There Be Light"	Darrell Faria & Jeremy Marc Poitras	February 29, 2024	104
5	"Into The Fire"	Darrell Faria	March 7, 2024	105
6	"The Table Is Set"	Darrell Faria	March 14, 2024	106
7	"Calm Waters"	Darrell Faria	March 28, 2024	107
8	"Tea Time"	Darrell Faria	April 4, 2024	108

== Awards ==
The Great Canadian Pottery Throw Down was nominated for Best Reality/Competition Program or Series and for Best Direction, Reality/Competition for Darrell Faria for the episode "Into the Fire" at the 13th Canadian Screen Awards.
