= Merv (film) =

- Release poster
- Directed by: Jessica Swale
- Written by: Dane Clark; Linsey Stewart
- Produced by: Matt Baer; Roma Downey
- Starring: Zooey Deschanel; Charlie Cox; Chris Redd; David Hunt; Patricia Heaton
- Cinematography: Julio Macat
- Edited by: Annette Davey; Nancy Richardson
- Music by: Tom Howe
- Production companies: Metro-Goldwyn-Mayer; Catchlight Studios; Lightworkers Media; Matt Baer Films
- Distributed by: Amazon MGM Studios (via Prime Video)
- Release date: December 10, 2025
- Running time: 105 minutes
- Country: United States
- Language: English

Merv is a 2025 American romantic comedy film directed by Jessica Swale and written by Dane Clark and Linsey Stewart. It stars Charlie Cox and Zooey Deschanel.

== Plot ==
Teacher Russ and optometrist Anna share custody of their dog Merv, on alternating weeks, following their break-up. However, Merv is diagnosed with a depression due to their break-up, so Russ takes him to a dog hotel in Florida. Believing he is still unhappy, Anna secretly travels after them.

At the hotel, Merv's mood improves upon having his humans reunited. The three are invited to a party where Anna gets jealous of Russ's chemistry with the party's host Jocelyn, and Russ gets jealous of Jocelyn's brother flirting with Anna. Russ brings up that he had proposed to Anna before their breakup. When visiting Russ's parents, they slowly start to reconcile. Russ rejects Jocelyn and confesses to Anna that he still loves her, but Anna is reluctant. It is revealed that Anna shut out Russ when she found out that she is infertile. After their trip, Russ leaves her sole custody of Merv, claiming they promised him one home and that they can't go on like this.

Russ adopts a new dog from the shelter, who turns out to be depressed as well. At Christmas, Russ and Anna run into each other in the park while dog-walking, confess their love for each other, and reconcile.

== Cast ==
- Zooey Deschanel as Anna Finch
- Charlie Cox as Russ Owens
- Chris Redd as Vice Principal Desmond
- David Hunt as Jack Owens, Russ's father
- Patricia Heaton as MJ Owens, Russ's mother
- Ellyn Jameson as Jocelyn
- Wynn Everett as Gaia
- Jasmine Mathews as Rebekah
- Joey Slotnick as Dr. Zubrovsky
- Andrea Laing as Dr. Judy Bankert
- Jessica Swale as Ice Cream Lady

== Production ==
In March 2024, it was reported that a romantic comedy film titled Merv was in development, with Jessica Swale directing, Linsey Stewart and Dane Clark writing the screenplay and Zooey Deschanel starring.

In May, Charlie Cox, Chris Redd, Patricia Heaton, David Hunt, Ellyn Jameson, Wynn Everett, Jasmine Mathews, Darren DesLonde, and Joey Slotnick joined the cast of the film.

Principal photography began in April 2024, in Wilmington, North Carolina, and wrapped in June. Filming transformed part of Princess Street into a snowy winter holiday season setup in the summer, as well as giving the Kure Beach Fishing Pier a makeover.

== Reception ==
On the review aggregator website Rotten Tomatoes, 32% of 25 critics' reviews are positive, with an average rating of 4.3/10.
