= I Put a Hit on You =

- Directed by: Dane Clark; Linsey Stewart
- Written by: Dane Clark; Linsey Stewart
- Produced by: Jordan Gross; Mike MacMillan
- Starring: Sara Canning; Aaron Ashmore
- Cinematography: James Klopko
- Edited by: Jonathan Eagan
- Music by: Paul Aucoin
- Production company: Lithium Studios
- Distributed by: Mongrel Media
- Release date: January 2014 (Slamdance)
- Running time: 78 minutes
- Country: Canada
- Language: English

I Put a Hit on You is a 2014 Canadian romantic comedy thriller film, written and directed by Dane Clark and Linsey Stewart. The film stars Sara Canning as Harper, a woman whose attempt to propose marriage to her boyfriend Ray (Aaron Ashmore) goes awry and turns into a breakup; that night, she drunkenly hires a stranger over the internet to kill Ray, but regretting her actions a few hours later she has to go over to his apartment to prevent the hitman (Danny Smith) from going through with it.

The cast also includes Heather Sande, Jonathan Llyr, Sarah Evans and Darrell Faria in supporting roles.

== Production and distribution ==
Clark and Stewart's feature debut, the film entered production in 2012, with shooting commencing in Toronto on November 20. It was shot for a budget of less than $250,000.

The soundtrack includes music by Young Galaxy, The Rural Alberta Advantage, The Deadly Snakes, Austra and Diana.

The film premiered at the 2014 Slamdance Film Festival, and was screened at various film festivals in both Canada and the United States before going into limited commercial release in January 2015, with its commercial premiere taking place at Toronto's Royal Cinema.

== Critical response ==
Justin Lowe of The Hollywood Reporter wrote that "eventually the humor becomes overly repetitive, stretching for high concept but coming up short. Even Clark and Stewart’s tight script can’t find enough to do with the actors, as the film’s brief runtime begins showing wear midway through. Partly it’s due to the unlikely characterization of Harper as practically Internet-ignorant — not so plausible for a contemporary late-20s career woman. The idea that she could “accidentally” put a hit on Ray and not understand the implications of online communication strains credibility."

Brian Tallerico of Film Threat was more positive, writing that "Clark & Stewart’s script is smarter than the premise may first lead you to believe but it’s the performances that really elevate it. Ashmore seems genuine but this is Canning’s movie and one hopes that it gets this talented actress more exposure. She takes an incredibly difficult task – to make a woman who accidentally tries to kill her boyfriend likable to the point that we even root for this relationship to work out – and delivers on it. If one steps back and considers the tonal juggling act inherent in the very set-up of I Put a Hit on You, it’s impossible not to admire how it turned out."

Kevin Jagernauth of IndieWire was more mixed, writing that "from the start, even as far as the latitude that high concept comedies allow, “I Put A Hit On You” is fairly implausible. The phrase, “Why don’t you just…” will be a familiar one uttered aloud by anyone watching the movie. The decisions made by Harper and Ray are sometimes baffling, and often feel inorganic, mostly to serve the needs of the plot. But on the other hand, Clark and Stewart seem acutely aware their film is slight to begin with, and the tone is appropriately lightweight. Canning and Ashmore hit the right chemistry of a couple uniting in the face of a rather absurd and dangerous situation, but still distanced by the issues in their relationship. And while it never gets quite laugh-out-loud funny, there is a low-key charm and energy to the proceedings that keeps everything breezy in the brief 80-minute film."

== Awards ==
The film received a Canadian Comedy Award nomination for Best Film at the 16th Canadian Comedy Awards.
