= Clare McConnell =

Canadian actress

Clare McConnell is a Canadian actress from Calgary, Alberta, best known for her recurring roles as Dennas in Star Trek: Discovery and Effie Newsome Crabtree in Murdoch Mysteries.

An alumna of the Toronto company of The Second City, she received a Canadian Comedy Award nomination for Best Breakout Artist at the 18th Canadian Comedy Awards in 2017. She has also had roles in the television series Wynonna Earp, Coroner, American Gods, Killjoys, Nurses, Hudson & Rex and Slasher, the films This Is What It Sounds Like Falling Out of Love with You, Dim the Fluorescents and Stealing School, and the web series Avocado Toast.

She received a Canadian Screen Award nomination for Best Supporting Performance in a Web Series at the 11th Canadian Screen Awards in 2023, for Avocado Toast. In 2025 she had a recurring role as Dominique in the comedy web series Settle Down.
