= Pretend We're Kissing =

2014 Canadian film

- Poster
- Directed by: Matt Sadowski
- Written by: Matt Sadowski
- Produced by: Peter Harvey; Matt Sadowski
- Starring: Dov Tiefenbach; Tommie-Amber Pirie; Zoë Kravitz
- Cinematography: Joshua Allen
- Edited by: Jorge Weisz
- Music by: A. David MacKinnon
- Release date: April 3, 2015
- Running time: 78 minutes
- Country: Canada
- Language: English

Pretend We're Kissing is a 2014 Canadian romantic comedy drama film written and directed by Matt Sadowski and starring Dov Tiefenbach, Tommie-Amber Pirie and Zoë Kravitz.

== Cast ==
- Dov Tiefenbach as Benny
- Tommie-Amber Pirie as Jordan
- Zoë Kravitz as Autumn
- Loretta Yu as Lily
- David Reale as Bus Boy
- Andy McQueen as Jay
- Rainbow Sun Francks as Henri
- Rodrigo Fernandez-Stoll as Host

== Release ==
The film was released theatrically in Toronto, Ottawa and Vancouver on April 3, 2015.

== Reception ==
The film has an 83 percent rating on Rotten Tomatoes based on six reviews.

Brad Wheeler of The Globe and Mail gave the film a positive review and wrote, "the likable indie flick will connect with both hip cynics and those with rosier hopes."

Bruce DeMara of the Toronto Star awarded the film two and a half stars out of four and wrote, "Still, there’s just enough kooky appeal and wit to make Pretend We’re Kissing a romantic comedy that’s also a cautionary tale."

Barry Hertz of the National Post also gave the film a positive review and wrote, "Whatever your thoughts on the film’s central up-and-down relationship, though, you can’t help but fall in love with the way Sadowski frames the scenery."

The film received a Canadian Comedy Award nomination for Best Film at the 16th Canadian Comedy Awards.
