= Steph Tolev =

Canadian stand-up comedian (born 1985)

- Born: Stephanie Tolev; March 7, 1985 (age 41); Toronto, Ontario, Canada
- Occupations: Stand-up comedian; sketch comedy performer; actress
- Years active: 2009–present

Stephanie Tolev (Bulgarian: Стефани Толев; born March 7, 1985) is a Canadian comedian and actress.

Along with comedian Allison Hogg, Tolev was a member of the sketch comedy duo Ladystache, which won awards for Most Innovative Comedy Troupe and the Just for Laughs Award at Montreal Sketchfest in 2010 and 2014, respectively.

She won the award for Best Female Stand Up at the 2015 Canadian Comedy Awards, and her 2019 comedy album I'm Not Well, was nominated for the Juno Award for Comedy Album of the Year at the Juno Awards of 2020, and in 2016, she was featured as "The nine funniest stand-up acts in Toronto right now" by Toronto Life magazine.

== Early life ==
Born in Toronto to ethnically Bulgarian immigrant parents, Tolev grew up in the city's East York district and attended East York Collegiate Institute. From the age of three to eighteen, she participated in competitive highland dance. She was inspired to perform comedy after playing the role of Nick Bottom in a high school production of Shakespeare's A Midsummer Night's Dream.

Tolev enrolled in the Comedy Writing and Performance program at Humber College and performed stand-up for the first time at a Scarborough bar at 18 years of age. It was at Humber College that she met future sketch comedy collaborator, Allison Hogg. After graduation in 2005, Tolev and Hogg were part of a four-person, all female improv group.

== Career ==
In 2009, Tolev and Hogg formed the sketch comedy duo Ladystache. The troupe's name makes reference to a female moustache. Tolev and Hogg were influenced by The Kids in the Hall, Simon Pegg and Nick Frost, and SCTV.

Ladystache won the award for Most Innovative Comedy Troupe at Montreal Sketchfest in 2010 and were nominated for Best Sketch Troupe at the 2013 Canadian Comedy Awards. They won the Just for Laughs Award at Montreal Sketchfest in 2014 and released their comedy album "So Many Wolves" that same year. The duo also performed at the Edinburgh Fringe Festival, North by Northeast, the Toronto and Vancouver Sketchfests, as well as the Just for Laughs festival in Toronto.

While performing with Ladystache, Tolev continued to perform stand-up and won the award for Best Female Stand Up at the 2014 Canadian Comedy Awards. She was a finalist in SiriusXM Canada's Next Top Comic competition in 2015.

In 2016, Tolev moved to Los Angeles and released her first stand-up album Hot N' Hungry. She released her comedy album "I'm Not Well" in 2019, which garnered her a nomination for the Juno Award for Comedy Album of the Year in 2020. She became a paid regular at The Comedy Store in 2021.

In 2022, she opened for Bill Burr during his comedy tour and was featured in his Netflix special, Bill Burr Presents: Friends Who Kill. She performed at Just For Laughs in Montreal in 2023 and launched her podcast "Steph Infection" that same year. For her podcast, Tolev interviews fellow comedians about bodily ailments.

Tolev's comedic style, both in sketch comedy and stand-up, has been described by the media as "raunchy" During an interview in 2022, Tolev described her comedy as "brash, vulgar, self-deprecating, physical, silly and painfully real."

In 2024, Tolev appeared as a guest judge on the Snatch Game episode of the fifth season of Canada's Drag Race. In 2025, she filmed Filth Queen at the Paradise Rock Club in Boston, Massachusetts for Netflix. The same year, she was also a guest star in Season 2 of the Netflix series Tires.
