= Don't Talk to Irene =

2017 comedy film directed by Pat Mills

- Theatrical release poster
- Directed by: Pat Mills
- Written by: Pat Mills
- Produced by: Alyson Richards; Mike MacMillan
- Starring: Michelle McLeod; Bruce Gray; Anastasia Phillips; Scott Thompson; Geena Davis
- Cinematography: Paul Sarossy
- Edited by: Tiffany Beaudin
- Music by: Erica Procunier
- Production companies: Alyson Richards Productions; Lithium Studios
- Distributed by: Search Engine Films
- Release dates: September 11, 2017 (Toronto); September 29, 2017 (Canada)
- Running time: 82 minutes
- Country: Canada
- Language: English

Don't Talk to Irene is a 2017 Canadian comedy film written and directed by Pat Mills. It premiered at the 2017 Toronto International Film Festival.

The film centres on Irene (Michelle McLeod), an overweight and unpopular high school student who wishes to be a cheerleader. After being suspended from school, Irene is sent to a retirement home as punishment. She decides to indulge her passion for cheerleading by enrolling a group of senior citizens for a dance competition. The film's cast also includes Bruce Gray, Anastasia Phillips, Scott Thompson, and Geena Davis.

== Cast ==
- Michelle McLeod as Irene
- Bruce Gray as Charles
- Anastasia Phillips as Lydia
- Scott Thompson as Barrett
- Geena Davis as herself (voice-over and brief cameo)
- Deborah Grover as Ruth
- Joan Gregson as Millie
- Andy Reid as Tesh
- Aviva Mongillo as Sarah
- Romeo Carere as Robbie
- James Fry as Tony
- Kyla Kane as Kelly
- Jacob Switzer as Jacques
- Alexa Rose Steele as Rachel (credited as Alex Steele)
- Darrell Faria as Top Talent Showdown Host
- Tracey Hoyt as Principal Firestone

== Production and accolades ==
Mills won the Toronto International Film Festival's annual Pitch This! competition for emerging film directors in 2008 for the film's original pitch, and the film's screenplay won the award for Best Comedy Screenplay at the 2013 Austin Film Festival. However, Mills made Guidance (2015) as his feature film debut before proceeding with Don't Talk to Irene, which entered production in 2016. It went on to win both the Comedy Vanguard Award and Audience Award at the Austin Film Festival, the Audience Choice at the Kingston Canadian Film Festival and the Galet d'Or at the 5th Canadian film festival of Dieppe, France. In June 2018, Don't Talk to Irene won two Canadian Comedy Awards: Best Feature and Best Writing in a Feature.

== Release ==
Don't Talk to Irene received a limited release at Cineplex Yonge-Dundas in Toronto on September 29, 2017, by Search Engine Films. In the United States, the film was released on March 2, 2018, by Gravitas Ventures.
