= Guilt Free Zone =

Canadian television series

Guilt Free Zone is a Canadian sketch comedy and variety television series, which premiered on APTN in 2015. The series features musical performances in a fictional bar owned by indigenous Canadian blues musician Derek Miller, mixed with sketch comedy segments.

Comedians associated with the show have included Herbie Barnes, Amy Matysio, Darrell Dennis, Craig Lauzon, Camille Stopps, Michaela Washburn, Sarah Podemski and Gary Farmer, while musical guests have included Lee Harvey Osmond, Leela Gilday, DJ Shub, Vern Cheechoo, David R. Maracle, Lacey Hill and Arthur Renwick. The series was first created in 2015 as essentially a talk show hosted by Miller to interview indigenous Canadian talent, and was reinvented as a variety show after it was determined that the original talk show format made it ineligible for the federal tax credits it had received during the production process.

The series received two Canadian Comedy Award nominations at the 18th Canadian Comedy Awards in 2018, for Best TV Show and Best Writing in a TV Series or Special (Darrell Dennis for the episode "Cops & Mobsters"). At the 19th Canadian Comedy Awards in 2019, Matysio was a nominee for Best Performance in a TV Series.
