= Old stock =

In North America, Old Stock refers to lineage dating back to the colonial era:

- Old Stock Americans
- Old Stock Canadians

== Other ==
- Old Stock (film), a 2012 Canadian comedy film directed by James Genn
- New old stock (NOS), or old stock, aged merchandise that was never sold to a customer
