= Iron cobra =

Iron cobra may refer to:

- Iron Cobra, a Canadian improv comedy duo
- Iron cobra, a monster in the tabletop roleplaying game Dungeons & Dragons
