= Big News from Grand Rock =

- Directed by: Daniel Perlmutter
- Written by: Daniel Perlmutter
- Produced by: Michael McNamara
- Starring: Ennis Esmer; Meredith MacNeill; Aaron Ashmore
- Cinematography: Samy Inayeh
- Edited by: Roderick Deogrades
- Music by: Andre Ethier; Sandro Perri
- Production company: Markham Street Films
- Distributed by: Capital Motion Picture Group
- Release date: September 18, 2014 (Cinéfest)
- Running time: 87 minutes
- Country: Canada
- Language: English

Big News from Grand Rock is a Canadian comedy film, directed by Daniel Perlmutter and released in 2014.

The film stars Ennis Esmer as Leonard Crane, a journalist for the community newspaper in the small town of Grand Rock. Faced with declining readership and the threat of the paper being sold off by owner Stan (Gordon Pinsent), he tries to save the paper's fortunes by writing fabricated news stories inspired by old movies suggested to him by the owner of the local video rental store (Aaron Ashmore), which works until Lucy (Meredith MacNeill), a journalist from the big city, arrives to investigate after he turns the 1996 thriller Extreme Measures into a story about secret medical experiments being conducted in Grand Rock.

The cast also includes Kristin Booth, Tammy Isbell and Peter Keleghan as colleagues of Leonard's at the paper, Leah Pinsent as Grand Rock's mayor Jane Davis, and Art Hindle, David Reale, Josette Halpert, Ryan Worthing, Lorna Wright, Darcy Gerhart, Darcy Campbell, Shauna Bailey and Joyce Cyr in supporting roles.

== Production ==
The film was inspired by the case of Stephen Glass, an American journalist who lost his job in 1998 after it was determined that many of the articles he had written for The New Republic contained fabrications.

Perlmutter first pitched the project in 2009 at the Toronto International Film Festival's Pitch This competition, which Esmer was hosting, and the screenplay was subsequently developed through the Telefilm Comedy Lab program at the Canadian Film Centre. It entered production in fall 2013 in Midland, Ontario; Esmer described the town as having been so accommodating that the municipal government intentionally dug a pothole in one of its streets because it was needed as a plot point in the film, while Perlmutter noted that over 100 people showed up when a call was sent out for local residents to appear in the film as extras.

== Distribution ==
The film premiered at the 2014 Cinéfest Sudbury International Film Festival. It was commercially released in winter 2015.

== Critical response ==
Ken Eisner of The Georgia Straight wrote that "for his debut feature, writer-director Daniel Perlmutter keeps the proportions exactly right, balancing a steady stream of small laughs with a story that engages, mainly through the hearty efforts of actors all on the same page—Page One, you could say."

Chris Knight of the National Post opined that "while the plot has a slightly by-the-numbers feel – a tepid rom-com angle is ill-advised and does nothing for the story – it gets a lot of mileage out of its kooky concept." He added that "it’s great to see Keleghan as an older, somehow less wise version of his character from CBC’s short-lived series The Newsroom."

Brad Wheeler of The Globe and Mail called the film "a straight-faced but screwball comedy that's a little dated – rotary-dial phones? – yet absolutely pleasing. Filmed in Midland, Ont., Daniel Perlmutter's quaint (and partly crowd-sourced) feature is 87 minutes of fun time, if a little clichéd in its depiction of village mentalities and humdrumness."

== Awards ==
The film received three Canadian Comedy Award nominations at the 16th Canadian Comedy Awards in 2015, for Best Film, Best Writing in a Film (Perlmutter) and Best Female Performance in a Film (McNeill).
