= Meet the Family (TV series) =

Canadian television series

Meet the Family is a Canadian scripted, hidden camera comedy series based on the British series Meet the Parents, which aired on Citytv from 2013 to 2015. In each episode, a boyfriend in a new relationship is brought "home" to meet his girlfriend's family, unaware that they're all played by actors or that the house is filled with 30 hidden cameras; the show was also effectively a game show, in which the couple would win a romantic vacation for two at a luxury resort if the boyfriend was successfully kept in the home for three hours without running away from the insanity of his girlfriend's "family".

The series was produced by Frantic Films and shot on location in Toronto, Ontario. It was directed by Derek Harvie, and written by Harvie, Ron Sparks, Matthew Doyle, Evany Rosen and Hannah Hogan. Although the series itself was primarily scripted rather than being fully improvised, actors with some background in improvisational comedy were selected for the family roles due to the unpredictability of the boyfriend's behaviour.

The series premiered at 8:30pm on September 29, 2013. In the first season, the series had a regular cast of comedic actors who played the family members, including Terry Barna as the dad, Liz Best as the mom, Hannah Hogan as the sister and Jason DeRosse as the brother.

Citytv renewed the series for a second season, which premiered on September 13, 2014 and concluded February 21, 2015. The Season 2 cast brought in different actors, with notable new cast members including Theresa Tova, Bruce Hunter and Miguel Rivas, and rotated each episode so that each family was different. The second season featured a crossover episode with The Bachelor Canada, in which Tim Warmels (The Bachelor) shows up at the house with roses for the family's mother in an attempt to make the boyfriend believe she was having an affair with Warmels.

Citytv announced in March 2015 that the series would not be renewed for a third season.

== Awards ==
Award	Date of ceremony	Category	Nominees	Result	Reference
Canadian Comedy Awards	September 14, 2014	Best TV Show	Meet the Family	Nominated	
Canadian Comedy Awards	September 14, 2014	Best Female Performance in a TV Series	Liz Best	Nominated	
Canadian Comedy Awards	September 14, 2014	Best Direction in a TV Series or Special	Derek Harvie — "Germaphobe"	Nominated	
Canadian Comedy Awards	September 14, 2014	Best Writing in a TV Series or Special	Matt Doyle, Derek Harvie, Evany Rosen, Ron Sparks — "Sugar Daddy"	Nominated	
Canadian Comedy Awards	September 13, 2015	Best TV Show	Meet the Family	Nominated	
Canadian Comedy Awards	September 13, 2015	Best Male Performance in a TV Series	Terry Barna	Nominated	
Canadian Comedy Awards	September 13, 2015	Best Direction in a TV Series or Special	Derek Harvie	Nominated	
Canadian Comedy Awards	September 13, 2015	Best Writing in a TV Series or Special	Matt Doyle, Derek Harvie, Hannah Hogan, Brian Peco, Ron Sparks	Nominated	
