= Shirley Gnome =

Canadian singer and comedian

Shirley Gnome is a Canadian singer and comedian from Vancouver, British Columbia. Best known as a singer of comedy songs about taboo topics such as sexuality, she received a Juno Award nomination for Comedy Album of the Year at the Juno Awards of 2021 for her 2020 album Decoxification.

Gnome grew up in Surrey, British Columbia, a place she describes as “a big place with a lot of contradictions. From the south you could smell the salty sea air. From the north you could hear gunshots and sirens".

Her other albums have included Ho Down (2010), C*untry Music (2012), The Lady of the Night (2015) Taking It Up the Notch (2017). and Live, Bare and Natural (2025). Her first three releases were independent before signing with the Vancouver based label 604 Records. Her style has evolved from country music toward a diverse blend of country, rock and electronic pop.

She describes her music as “little lullabies about things we think about, but don’t talk about. With the intent to reveal that at the end of the day, it’s not really a big deal”.

Gnome co-wrote the music for SLUGS, the critically acclaimed anarcho-clown show from Creepy Boys that was nominated for the Edinburgh Comedy Award in 2025.

She is also a four-time Canadian Comedy Award nominee for Best Variety Act, receiving nods at the 15th Canadian Comedy Awards in 2014, the 16th Canadian Comedy Awards in 2015, the 18th Canadian Comedy Awards in 2018 and the 19th Canadian Comedy Awards in 2019. In 2018, she also received a nomination for Best Comedy Album, for Taking It Up the Notch.
