= But I'm Chris Jericho! =

Canadian comedy web series

- Country of origin: Canada

Production
- Production company: Insight Productions

Original release
- Network: YouTube
- Release: 2013 – 2017

But I'm Chris Jericho! is a Canadian comedy web series, which premiered in 2013. The series stars professional wrestler Chris Jericho as a fictionalized version of himself, trying to establish a career as an actor after retiring from wrestling.

The cast also includes Andy Kindler, Arlene Duncan, Christian Potenza, Scott Thompson, Laurie Elliott, Kevin Vidal, Mayko Nguyen, Brandon Firla, Ashley Comeau and Colin Mochrie.

The series debuted on Action's web channel on YouTube in 2013, before being broadcast by the linear television channel in 2015. In 2017 it was picked up for a second season by CBC Comedy, with both seasons remaining available on CBC Gem.

The series won two Canadian Comedy Awards at the 15th Canadian Comedy Awards in 2014, for Best Male Performance in a Web Series (Thompson) and Best Writing in a Web Series (Bob Kerr for the episode "Acting Class"). It was also a nominee for Best Web Series, Best Female Performance in a Web Series (Elliott) and Best Direction in a Web Series (Mike Fly for "Acting Class").
