= Independent Production Fund =

- Industry: Original online series, Digital Media, television
- Founded: 1991
- Headquarters: Toronto, Ontario Montreal, Quebec
- Area served: Canada
- Key people: Jon Taylor, CEO
- Revenue: 2,038,068 Canadian dollar (2003)
- Total assets: 36,079,175 Canadian dollar (2003)
- Number of employees: 5 (2003, 2004, 2005, 2016, 2017, 2018, 2019, 2023)
- Website: ipf.ca

The Independent Production Fund (IPF) is a Canadian private independent foundation that supports the production of Canadian dramatic digital media entertainment content and television series. It also provides professional development services and training to digital media producers and creators, in English and in French. See also Fonds indépendant de production entry (in French).

== History ==
In 1990 Maclean Hunter Limited, a former Canadian communications company, created the Maclean Hunter Television Fund with a capital endowment of $29.2 M restricted in perpetuity, as a result of a Decision by the Canadian Radio-Television and Telecommunications Commission (CRTC). The Fund was incorporated federally as a corporation without share capital and was granted charitable status. Its mandate was to fund television drama series and undertake industry training with the interest generated by the endowment and return on investments.

The Fund mandate was extended to undertake the administration of other independent private funds supporting the Canadian film, television and digital media industry: the Cogeco Program Development Fund launched in 1993, the Bell Fund (1997) and a series of other short-term industry Funds.

In 1994 Maclean Hunter was acquired by Rogers Communications, and the Fund was renamed the Independent Production Fund. A five-member board of directors representing different sectors of the production industry governed the Fund's activities.

In 1999 the CRTC approved the IPF as a "Canadian Independent Production Fund" eligible to receive contributions from Broadcast Distribution Undertakings (BDU's). In 2017, Cogeco Communications directed its annual Broadcast Distribution Undertaking (BDU) contributions to the IPF to establish the Cogeco TV Production Program.

From 1991 to 2010 the IPF invested over $47M in 251 Canadian television drama series. In 2010, the IPF's mandate was revised to focus funding on drama series created for new digital platforms. It allocates nearly $2M per year from the interest generated by the endowment and recoupment of its funding investments, to original digital drama series. From 2010–2017 the IPF invested $12.8M in 114 short form scripted digital series.

== Executives ==
- CEO 1991–present: Andra Sheffer
- Associate Director (Quebec) 1991 – present: Claire Dion
- Chair 1991–1995: Bernard Montigny
- Chair 1996–2008: Peter Mortimer
- Chair 2009–2017: Charles Ohayon
- Chair 2018–present: Jon Taylor

== Fund Recipients ==
As of 2017, the IPF has supported 251 television projects, 422 professional development activities and 114 original online series which represents nearly $65M in funding.

=== Selection of funded original online series ===
Series	Description and Awards
The Amazing Gayl Pile	A man gives his all to conquer the world of home shopping from a channel in Hamilton, Ontario Canadian Screen Award – Best Original Program or Series produced for Digital Media – Fiction, Best Direction in a Program or Series Produced for Digital Media (2017) (Nominee) International Emmy Award – Best Short-Form Series (2017)
Guidestones	Two journalism students uncover a global conspiracy while investigating an unsolved murder International Emmy Award – Best Digital Program: Fiction (2013) Canadian Screen Award – Best Original Series Produced for Digital Media (2013)
My 90 Year Old Roommate	Ethan, a 31-year-old single man, moves in with his 90-year-old grandfather and the pair quickly realize that they have a lot to learn from each other Canadian Screen Award – Best Performance by an Actor in a Web Series or Program: Paul Soles (2017)
peopleWatching	Humorous and heartfelt short stories about people trying to find acceptance, romance and sanity, and how you can watch people all day long... Banff World Media Festival Rockie Award – Best Web Series Fiction (2017)
Versus Valerie	Versus Valerie follows Valerie Lapomme, YouTube's Sexy Nerd Girl, as she navigates her chaotic life, sliding between reality and her video-game and genre-bending imagination. Canadian Comedy Awards – Best Web Series, Best Female Performance in a Web Series, Best Direction in a Web Series, and Best Writing in a Web Series (2014).
Whatever, Linda	A Woman in the 1970s gets a job as a secretary for financier Barney Lahnar (inspired by Bernie Madoff) and becomes the real brains behind the Ponzi scheme that will eventually bring him down Vancouver Web Fest – Best Canadian Series, Best Drama Series (2015)
