= Hot Thespian Action =

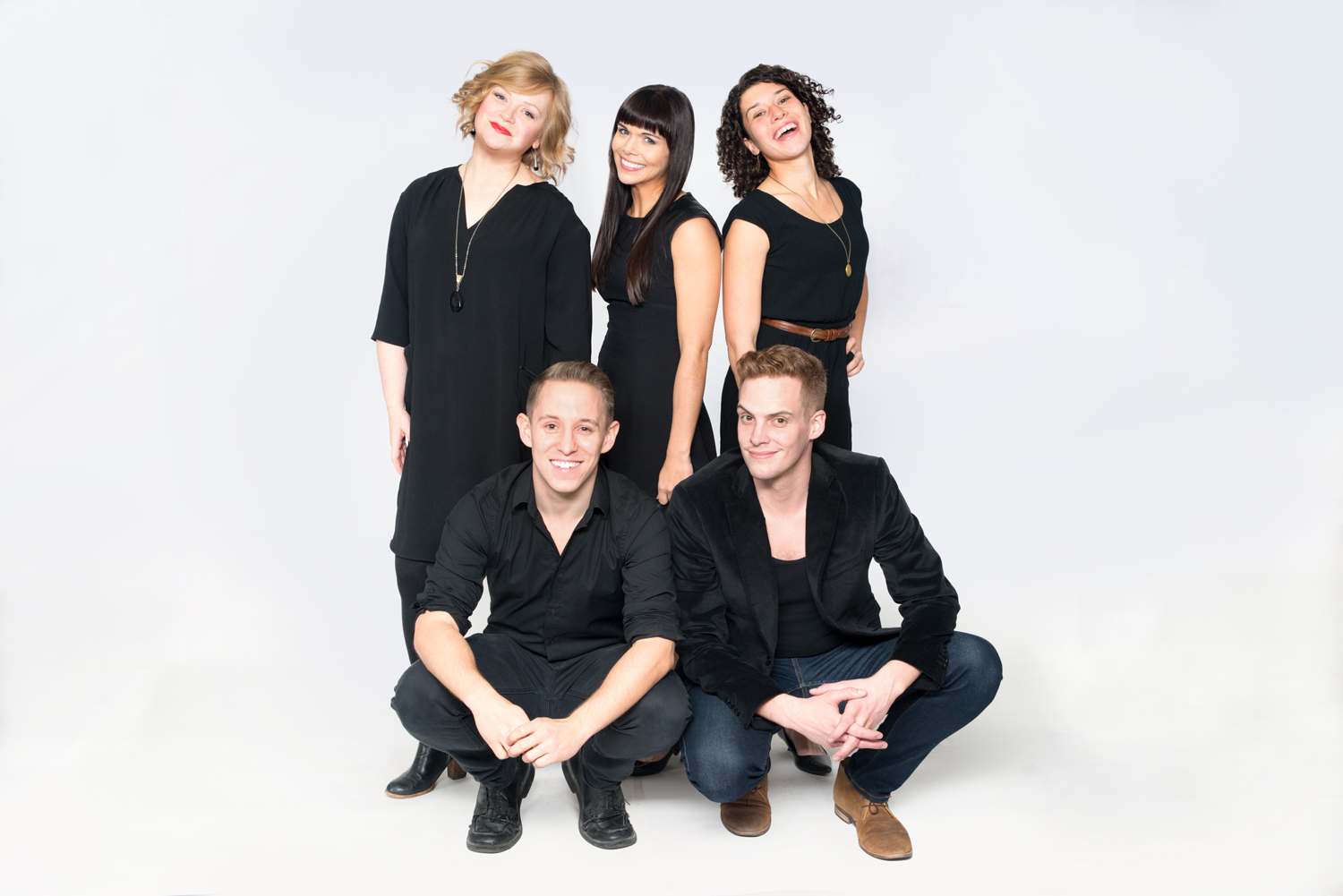
Hot Thespian Action

Hot Thespian Action is a sketch comedy troupe based out of Winnipeg, Manitoba, Canada. They have been nominated three times for "Best Sketch Troupe" at the Canadian Comedy Awards. The group consists of Shannon Guile, Jacqueline Loewen, Garth Merkeley, Ryan Miller, and Jane Testar. They appear yearly at the Winnipeg Fringe Theatre Festival, the Winnipeg Comedy Festival, and many other sketch comedy festivals across North America.

== About ==
Hot Thespian Action began in 2006 in a special studies class in Advanced Mime and Improv at the University of Winnipeg under the tutelage of Rick Skene. The troupe has appeared multiple times at the Winnipeg Fringe Theatre Festival to great acclaim. They have appeared twice in the televised galas at the Winnipeg Comedy Festival, first in "The All-Star Super Good Variety Special" in 2011 hosted by Andrea Martin and then in the "Save the World Telethon" in 2012 as Alan Thicke's singing and dancing sidekicks.

The troupe is currently working with Emmy and Golden Globe winning producer Kim Todd on a sitcom pilot.

HTA has also performed at Toronto SketchFest, SketchFest Seattle, Chicago SketchFest, San Francisco SketchFest, Vancouver Sketch Comedy Festival, Saskatoon Fringe Festival, the Edmonton Fringe Festival, and the Canadian Comedy Awards.
