= Suze (film) =

2023 Canadian comedy-drama film

- Film poster
- Directed by: Dane Clark; Linsey Stewart
- Written by: Dane Clark; Linsey Stewart
- Produced by: Matt Code; Kristy Neville
- Starring: Michaela Watkins; Charlie Gillespie; Sara Waisglass; Aaron Ashmore
- Cinematography: Jordan Kennington
- Edited by: Hugh Elchuk
- Production company: Wildling Pictures
- Distributed by: Levelfilm; Tribeca Films
- Release date: September 16, 2023 (AIFF)
- Running time: 93 minutes
- Country: Canada
- Language: English

Suze is a 2023 Canadian comedy-drama film, written and directed by Dane Clark and Linsey Stewart. The film stars Michaela Watkins as Suze, a woman whose feelings of empty nest syndrome after her daughter Brooke (Sara Waisglass) moves away to attend university lead her to become a doting mother figure to Brooke's ex-boyfriend Gage (Charlie Gillespie) even though she never liked him at all when he and Brooke were dating.

The film entered production in fall 2022 in Hamilton, Ontario.

The film premiered at the Atlantic International Film Festival on September 16, 2023, and was screened at the 2023 Cinéfest Sudbury International Film Festival, and the 2023 Calgary International Film Festival. It was released theatrically by Tribeca Films in the U.S. in February 2025.

== Plot ==
Susan, a divorced middle-aged marketing manager and single mother, struggles to adjust as her daughter Brooke prepares to graduate from high school and leave for university. At the same time, Susan is dealing with perimenopause, the emotional aftermath of her former husband Alan’s affair with his new partner Jacinta, and a growing fear of being left alone. Brooke wants greater independence and eventually reveals that she has accepted admission to McGill University in Montreal without first telling her mother. Although Susan is deeply hurt by the prospect of losing the person who has become the centre of her life, she ultimately supports Brooke’s decision and sends her away to university while privately confronting her loneliness and unresolved attachment to Alan.

Brooke’s former boyfriend Gage attempts suicide after their breakup by text message, prompting Brooke to ask Susan to check on him. When Gage’s father leaves him in Susan’s care while working away from home, Susan becomes increasingly involved in his recovery, and their relationship develops from reluctant obligation into a genuine friendship and surrogate mother-son bond. Susan encourages Gage to return to school, stand up for himself, and pursue his goal of becoming a recreation therapist, while Gage helps her recognize how completely she has defined herself through her marriage and motherhood. When Gage makes a romantic advance toward Susan, she firmly but compassionately establishes appropriate boundaries. By the end, both have begun moving beyond their emotional dependence on Brooke, with Gage rebuilding his confidence and future plans and Susan developing an identity independent of Alan and her role as a mother.

== Cast ==
- Michaela Watkins as Susan
- Charlie Gillespie as Gage
- Sara Waisglass as Brooke
- Aaron Ashmore as Rick
- Rainbow Sun Francks as Carlos
- Krista Bridges as Deb
- Sandy Jobin-Bevans as Alan
- Sorika Wolf as Jacinta

== Reception ==
=== Critical response ===
On the review aggregator website Rotten Tomatoes, 100% of 29 critics' reviews are positive, with an average rating of 7.7/10. The website's consensus reads: "Suze blends warm humor, grounded performances, and unexpectedly resonant themes into a tender, funny dramedy that's elevated by Michaela Watkins and Charlie Gillespie's chemistry."

Richard Crouse gave the film three and a half stars and wrote, "Suze is a never-judge-a-book-by-its-cover story, with a few laughs, some earned heartfelt moments and heaps of compassion." In a positive review, Sarah Gopaul of Digital Journal wrote, "The performances of Watkins and Gillespie are what make this picture sweet rather than an awkward May–December drama." For Exclaim!, Sarah Regan wrote, "dig deep and viewers will discover a tale of the transformative power of unlikely relationships and connection, and how a shared experience can allow one to rediscover their purpose."

=== Awards ===
At Calgary, the film won the Air Canada Award for Best Canadian Narrative Feature, and Gillespie received a special jury citation for his performance.
