= Old Stock (film) =

- Theatrical poster featuring actors Noah Reid and Melanie Leishman
- Directed by: James Genn
- Written by: Dane Clark
- Produced by: Geordie Sabbagh
- Starring: Noah Reid; Melanie Leishman
- Cinematography: Arthur E. Cooper
- Edited by: Kye Meechan
- Music by: Dave Genn
- Production companies: Canadian Film Centre; Geordie Sabbagh Productions
- Distributed by: Entertainment One
- Release date: September 2012 (Cinéfest)
- Running time: 85 minutes
- Country: Canada
- Language: English

Old Stock is a 2012 Canadian romantic comedy-drama film, directed by James Genn.

The film stars Noah Reid as Stock Burton, a young man who has spent two years acting as if he were already elderly, living with his grandfather Harold (Danny Wells) in a retirement home, to escape the disapproval of the community after having been unwittingly responsible for an accident that disrupted his high school graduating prom. One day he meets and connects with Patti (Melanie Leishman), a woman who is teaching dance classes at the senior's home as community service after being found guilty of pyromania, who may finally provide the impetus for Stock to move out of the retirement home and start living life as a young man again.

== Cast ==
- Noah Reid as Stock
- Melanie Leishman as Patti
- Danny Wells (credited as Jack Daniel Wells) as Harold
- Corinne Conley as Gloria
- Anna Ferguson as Millicent
- Gene Mack as Wendel
- Meghan Heffern as Dahlia
- Anand Rajaram as Dr. Anand
- Louise Nicol as Good Samantha
- Nonnie Griffin as Pretty Senior
- Cameron Ansell as Brandon
- Brandon Burstein as Sue
- Jacob Kraemer as Tristan
- Jason Weinberg as Jason Weaver
- Ryan Blakely as Philip
- Seán Cullen as Mayor Mike Mahoney

== Production ==
Old Stock had a three-week shoot with several scenes filmed November 2011 in Orangeville at a real retirement home, the Lord Dufferin Centre.

== Distribution ==
The film premiered at the 2012 Cinéfest Sudbury International Film Festival, before going into commercial release in 2013.

== Critical response ==
Geoff Pevere of The Globe and Mail rated the film 2.5 stars, writing that "populated with winningly eccentric personalities (the odd-couple pairing of Reid and Leishman is especially appealing, in a mutually maladroit kind of way), chuckle-tickling one-liners and a universal conviction in the abiding but redeemable silliness of the human condition, Old Stock is an amiably warm celebration. Wear it like one of Stock's sweater vests and stand for the national anthem."

Linda Barnard of the Toronto Star was more negative, writing that the film's blending of comedic and dramatic tones didn't mesh, and concluding that "with a nod to John Hughes, director James Genn makes the best of what is clearly a limited budget. But Dane Clark's script is too twee and sitcom-like for its own good."

For Exclaim!, Scott Gray rated the film six out of ten, writing that "having something real to say about the uselessness of dwelling in the past or allowing oneself to become paralyzed by guilt over a random act of life is only enhanced by consistent, often subtle performances and Genn's use of forced-perspective to reinforce the supporting theme of encroaching modernity."

== Awards ==
The film received three Canadian Comedy Award nominations at the 15th Canadian Comedy Awards in 2014, for Best Feature Film, Best Direction in a Feature (James Genn) and Best Writing in a Feature (Dane Clark).

Dave Genn received a Leo Award nomination for Best Musical Score in a Feature Length Drama in 2013.

Dane Clark's screenplay for the film was a Praxis Screenwriting Competition Winner.
