= Darrell Faria =

Canadian actor, director and comedian

Darrell Faria is a Canadian actor, director and comedian. He is most noted as a two-time Canadian Screen Award nominee, receiving nominations for Best Performance in a Program or Series Produced for Digital Media at the 4th Canadian Screen Awards in 2016 for his comedy web series Chai-T, and Best Host in a Web Program or Series at the 10th Canadian Screen Awards in 2022 as host of the Toronto Sketch Comedy Festival's livestreamed awards presentation in 2021.

A native of Mississauga, Ontario, he is a graduate of the film studies program at Ryerson University, and was an instructor at the Mississauga Youth Theatre.

Chai-T also earned him a Canadian Comedy Award nomination for Best Male Performance in a Web Series at the 16th Canadian Comedy Awards.

He has appeared in the films White Night, I Put a Hit on You and Don't Talk to Irene, and has directed the short film Apples and Oranges and episodes of Bit Playas, True Dating Stories and TallBoyz.

In 2020, after their planned wedding was cancelled due to the COVID-19 pandemic in Canada, Faria and his fiancée Shannon made an internet comedy video in which they went around to various spots in Toronto to look for a new venue, before deciding to have an officiant marry them on the balcony of their own condo. The video was set to a self-performed cover of Beyoncé and Jay-Z's 2018 single "Apeshit".
