= Brace for Impact =

2016 Canadian television film

- Film poster
- Written by: Ian Carpenter
- Directed by: Michel Poulette
- Starring: Kerry Condon; Sheila McCarthy; Ennis Esmer
- Music by: James Gelfand; Louise Tremblay
- Country of origin: Canada
- Original language: English

Production
- Producer: Ian Whitehead
- Editor: Maxime Chalifoux
- Production company: Incendo Productions

Original release
- Network: Super Écran
- Release: November 2016
- Network: The Movie Network
- Release: December 2016

Brace for Impact (also known as Final Destiny in US release) is a Canadian television film, directed by Michel Poulette and released in 2016. The film stars Kerry Condon as Sofia Gilchrist, a disgraced airplane crash investigator whose brother has been killed in an airline crash, and who is secretly investigating the crash herself in defiance of her supervisor's orders. The film's cast also includes Sheila McCarthy and Ennis Esmer.

The film premiered in November 2016 on Super Écran in French, and in December 2016 on The Movie Network in English.

Esmer received a Canadian Screen Award nomination for Best Supporting Actor in a Drama Program or Series at the 6th Canadian Screen Awards.
