= Pat Mills (director) =

Canadian film director, screenwriter and actor

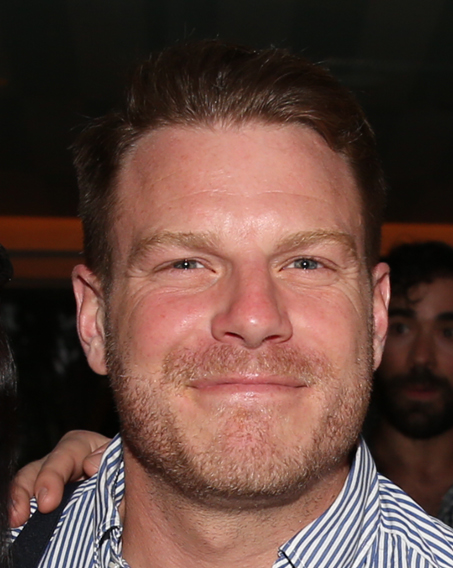
- Mills in 2015
- Born: Kevin Patrick Mills; Ottawa, Ontario, Canada
- Occupations: Film director, screenwriter, actor
- Known for: Guidance, Don't Talk to Irene

Kevin Patrick Mills is a Canadian film director, screenwriter and actor, whose feature film debut Guidance was released in 2015.

== Early life and education ==
A former child actor who appeared on the television series You Can't Do That on Television, Mills later studied filmmaking at Ryerson University and studied at the Canadian Film Centre.

== Career ==
Mills has directed several short films, including 5 Dysfunctional People in a Car, Marjorie, Pat's First Kiss, Babysitting Andy, The Affected Turtleneck Trio and I'm Not Martin!, and won the Toronto International Film Festival's annual Pitch This! competition for emerging film directors in 2008 for his pitch for Don't Talk to Irene. Don't Talk to Irene later won the award for Best Comedy Screenplay at the 2013 Austin Film Festival.

Mills, who is gay, wrote Guidance as a satirical spin on his own history as a child actor, centering the screenplay on a character whose backstory is similar to his own but who has much more dysfunctional ways of dealing with his insecurities. Having not taken an acting role since 1994, he had to pay almost ten years worth of back ACTRA dues to act in his own film. His performance was nominated for a 2015 ACTRA Award. Guidance was reviewed as a New York Times Critics' Pick upon its release.

Don't Talk to Irene went into production in 2016 as Mills' second film, premiered at the 2017 Toronto International Film Festival and was theatrically released in Canada and the USA. It went on to win both the Comedy Vanguard Award and Audience Award at the Austin Film Festival, the Audience Choice at the Kingston Canadian Film Festival and the Galet d'Or at the 5th Canadian film festival of Dieppe, France. Mills was also listed as one of MovieMaker Magazine's 25 Screenwriters to Watch in 2018. In June 2018, Don't Talk to Irene won two Canadian Comedy Awards: Best Feature and Best Writing in a Feature.

In 2020 Mills directed the digital series Queens for CBC Gem, and was nominated for a Writers Guild of Canada Screenwriting Award for the episode "Minnie and Sharron". Queens went on to be named Best Canadian Web Series of 2020 by Now.

In October 2020, he directed Lifetime's first LGBTQ+ Christmas movie, The Christmas Setup. The Christmas Setup was nominated for a GLAAD Media Award for Outstanding TV Movie, a Directors Guild of Canada Award for Outstanding Directorial Achievement in Movies for Television and Mini-Series, and the Canadian Screen Award for Best TV Movie at the 10th Canadian Screen Awards.

In 2023, Pat was nominated for a Director's Guild of Canada Award for Outstanding Direction in a Comedy Series for Run the Burbs. In the same year, Mills and Ayo Tsalithaba co-directed a Heritage Minute about American-Canadian singer Jackie Shane.

He collaborated with Noel S. Baker and Zoe Whittall on the screenplay for the 2024 film We Forgot to Break Up, which was directed by Karen Knox.

== Filmography ==
=== Film ===
Year	Title	Director	Writer
2014	Guidance	Yes	Yes
2017	Don't Talk to Irene	Yes	Yes
2021	The Retreat	Yes	No

Actor

Year	Title	Role	Notes
2001	The Affected Turtleneck Trio	Quann	Short film
2002	Secondary High	Steve	
2014	Guidance	David Gold	
2017	Don't Talk to Irene	Teacher	
2018	Honey Bee	Mr. Delaney	

=== Television ===
Director

- The Christmas Setup (2020) (TV movie)

Actor

Year	Title	Role	Notes
1979	You Can't Do That on Television		6 episodes (as Patrick Mills)
2018	Workin' Moms	Mark	Episode "Trash Panda"
