= Guidance (film) =

2014 film by Pat Mills

- Official Canadian poster
- Directed by: Pat Mills
- Written by: Pat Mills
- Produced by: Mike MacMillan; Alyson Richards; Ed Gernon
- Starring: Pat Mills; Kevin Hanchard; Zahra Bentham; Alex Ozerov; Jen Goodhue; Maria Vacratsis; Eleanor Zichy; Allison Hossack
- Cinematography: Daniel Grant
- Edited by: Bryan Atkinson
- Music by: Menalon
- Distributed by: Search Engine Films (Canada); Strand Releasing (U.S)
- Release date: 5 September 2014 (TIFF)
- Running time: 81 minutes
- Country: Canada
- Language: English

Guidance is a Canadian dark comedy film, which premiered at the 2014 Toronto Film Festival on September 5, 2014, as part of the Discovery program.

The full-length directorial debut of Pat Mills, the film stars Mills as David Gold, a down on his luck former child star who fabricates his credentials to take a job as a high school guidance counsellor. An unrecovered alcoholic and drug addict troubled by his faded success and in deep denial about both his closeted gay sexuality and his health following a skin cancer diagnosis, he becomes unexpectedly popular with the students after his habit of introducing them to his own deeply unhealthy coping mechanisms actually helps many of them solve their own problems.

The film's cast also includes Kevin Hanchard, Alex Ozerov, Zahra Bentham, Jen Goodhue, Maria Vacratsis, Eleanor Zichy and Allison Hossack. It has been picked up by Strand Releasing for distribution in the United States.

== Background ==
Mills, a former child actor who appeared on the television series You Can't Do That on Television in the 1980s, drew inspiration both from the troubled history of many child actors and from a desire to subvert the conventions of the stereotypical coming out narrative. He describes David Gold as an "alter ego" who faces some of the same insecurities that Mills had dealt with in his own life, but has much more dysfunctional ways of coping with them.

== Release ==
Guidance has received positive reviews from critics upon its release. IndieWire called it "a must see and a moving laugh-out-loud romp from start to finish". Variety gave the film a positive review, stating that it was a "delightful debut" and "The modest pic's laughs get bigger as it goes along, and so does its surprising warmth". The Los Angeles Times called it "a creative hat-trick of wildly amusing proportions". Allmovie wrote "the writer-director's premiere effort announces him as a major new onscreen talent and a fresh and welcome comedic voice." It was reviewed as The New York Times Critics' Pick upon its release. Review aggregation website Rotten Tomatoes gives the film a score of 88% based on 16 reviews.
