= Ennis Esmer =

Turkish-Canadian actor and comedian (born 1978)

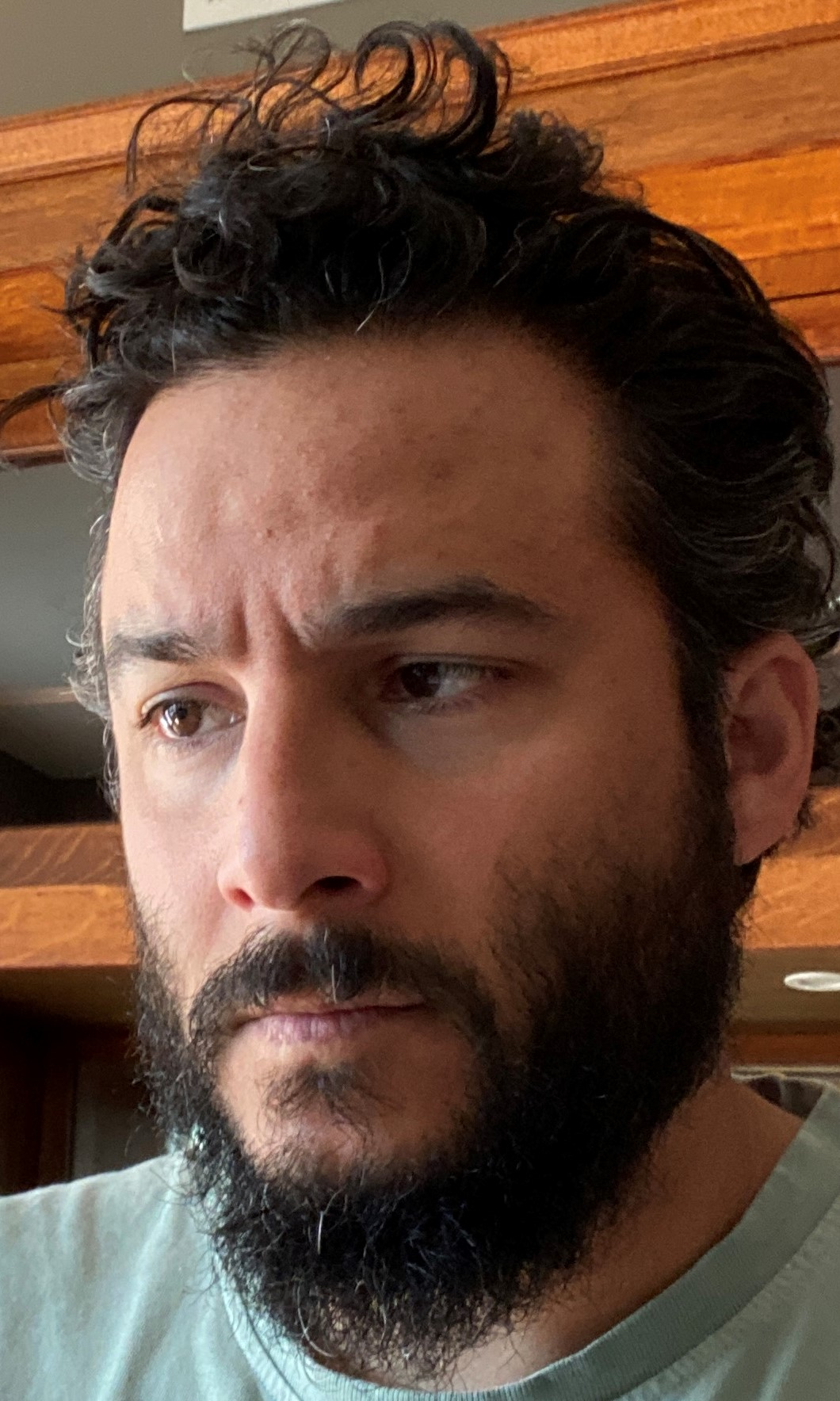
- Esmer in 2020
- Born: December 29, 1978 (age 47); Ankara, Turkey
- Occupations: Actor, writer, comedian, voice actor, producer, presenter
- Years active: 2003–present
- Spouse: Amy Blaxland

Ennis Esmer (born December 29, 1978) is a Turkish-Canadian actor, comedian, voice actor, writer, producer and presenter. He is best known for his roles as Osman 'Oz' Bey in The Listener (2009–2014), Nash in Red Oaks (2014–2017), Rich Dotcom in Blindspot (2015–2020) – a role that was specifically written for him, and Kurtis 'Maz' Mazhari in Private Eyes (2016–2021).

== Early life ==
Esmer was born in Ankara, Turkey, before moving to Toronto, Ontario, Canada, at the age of three. His father, Demir, and his mother, Alev, were both systems analysts. As a child, Esmer learned English by watching Canadian television – which included programs like Sesame Street and Today's Special. His parents divorced in his early teens, and his father remarried to Esmer's stepmother, Florence. Esmer attended Earl Haig Secondary School, in the Toronto suburb of North York, participating in the Claude Watson Program for gifted arts students. During his time at the school, he took improv and experimental theatre classes, was elected to student council, and produced school assemblies which became miniature talent showcases.

Esmer then attended the York University drama program for three years but left before completing it. He struggled with the limitations it set on his natural comedic abilities and has said that part of this at the time was an issue of confidence and maturity. However, even after leaving the university and for many years, he has continued to study and work with David Rotenberg, a York University professor emeritus of Theatre Studies and the artistic director of his own Professional Actor's Lab – and has said that Rotenberg was the person who allowed him to actually work on his dramatic ability without calling his comedic gifts a crutch. Esmer also did some training at Second City and has worked every comedy stage in Toronto.

== Career ==
Esmer first came to prominence as the writer and host of Toronto 1's short-lived variety series The Toronto Show in 2003. His first acting role that got him notice was in 2006, as the temperamental janitor Zoltan in the Gemini Awards-winning Billable Hours – this role set a precedent in Esmer's career, as what was originally a one-off appearance was expanded to a recurring role because of the popularity of his take on it. His next major role came in 2009 in The Listener as Osman 'Oz' Bey, the best friend of the main character Toby Logan (played by Craig Olejnik). Esmer was nominated once in 2010 for an ACTRA Award, and twice in 2010 and 2011 for Canadian Comedy Awards for this role. In the opposite seasons to shooting The Listener in Toronto, Esmer was shooting his role as Eddie, the apartment complex manager, in The L.A. Complex in Los Angeles – a situation that would repeat in his career.

Starting in 2014, Esmer had regular roles in You Me Her, Private Eyes, Red Oaks, and Blindspot, once again often shooting in opposite or even the same seasons. In Audience Network's polyamorous comedy You Me Her, he played Dave Amari, best friend and neighbour of Jack Trekarsky, the 'Him' of the title. In Global Television Network/Ion Television's Private Eyes, he played Kurtis 'Maz' Mazhari, a Detective who helped main characters Matt Shade (played by Jason Priestley) and Angie Everett (played by Cindy Sampson) solve crimes. He would be nominated in 2019 for a Canadian Screen Award for Best Supporting Actor in a Comedy at the 7th Canadian Screen Awards for this latter role.

In Amazon Studios 1980's set comedy-drama Red Oaks, he played the Turkish lothario tennis instructor Nash. He said of the role, 'It's fun to play a character who is a pretty decent representation of my ethnicity...His ethnicity doesn't define the role, and he gets to be a full person aside from that, and in fact, because of that.' In NBC's Blindspot, Esmer again took a role that was an originally a one-off spot in season one, and went first to recurring then series regular in season four. His instinctive improvisational style and delivery made fan-favourite Rich Dotcom what the show creator Martin Gero said was the character that defined the series. Esmer also had a memorable 3-episode arc as Emir Kaplan, the travel blogger who broke Stevie Budd's heart, in season five of the Emmy Award-winning comedy series Schitt's Creek.

From 2022 to 2025, Esmer had a regular role in CTV's comedy Children Ruin Everything.

Esmer has also undertaken several hosting duties in Canada – hosting, among others, the Gemini Awards twice, and the ACTRA Awards, even virtually hosting the feature films section of Directors Guild of Canada Awards in 2020, during the COVID-19 pandemic. He also presented Wipeout Canada and Roast Battle Canada, the Canadian version of Jeff Ross Presents Roast Battle.

In film, Esmer has worked extensively in Canadian indie short and feature-length films. He started his film career in a bit part as Ronnie in the American film How to Deal in 2003. His breakout film role was in 2007's Young People Fucking, co-written by his longtime friend and later Blindspot showrunner Martin Gero and other longtime friend Aaron Abrams. This film was notable not just for winning multiple Genie Awards and nearly sweeping the film category of the Canadian Comedy Awards, but also because of the furor around funding caused politically by its name and perceived content.

In 2014, Esmer starred in his first lead film role as Leonard Crane, a small-town newspaper reporter, in Big News from Grand Rock, a comedy-drama about the demise of small-town newspapers – on which he also served as an executive-producer. The same year, he played a supporting role as Sean in the romantic comedy Dirty Singles, for which he was nominated for an ACTRA Award, and won best male performance at the Canadian Comedy Awards. In 2015, he played a supporting role in sex comedy How to Plan an Orgy in a Small Town, directed by Jeremy Lalonde, again serving as executive-producer. In 2016, he played a supporting role in Miss Sloane with Jessica Chastain. That same year, he played Moe, a flight crash investigator, in the television film Brace for Impact, for which he was nominated for a Canadian Screen Award for Best Performance by Supporting Actor in a Drama at the 6th Canadian Screen Awards in 2018. Also in 2018, he played the astrophysicist Charlie in Clara, a science-fiction film which won the Jury Prize at the Austin Film Festival.

He won the Canadian Screen Award for Best Supporting Performance in a Comedy Series at the 11th Canadian Screen Awards in 2023, for his regular role in Children Ruin Everything.

== Personal life ==
Esmer is in a long-term relationship with Amy Blaxland – a stylist, costume designer and businesswoman.

Ennis Esmer is both publicly and privately involved in many charities, focusing on homelessness, poverty, sick children, and reading (particularly in the Greater Toronto area).

Esmer is also a lifelong Toronto Raptors and Toronto Blue Jays fan. He is the originator of the nickname 'Spice and Dice' for Toronto Raptors players Pascal Siakam and Fred VanVleet.

== Filmography ==
=== Film ===
Year	Film	Role	Notes
2003	How to Deal	Ronnie	
2004	Welcome to Mooseport	Airport Passenger	
2004	Decoys	Gibby	
2004	All You Got	Paul	
2007	Young People Fucking	Gord	
2007	Your Beautiful Cul de Sac Home	Phil Goodfellow	
2008	The Rocker	Barney	
2013	Sex After Kids	Ben	Nominated – Canadian Comedy Award for Best Male Performance in a Feature
2014	Big News from Grand Rock	Leonard Crane	
2014	Dirty Singles	Sean	Nominated – ACTRA Award for Best Male Performance in a Feature – 2015; Won – Best Male Performance in a Feature at Canadian Comedy Awards – 2015
2015	How to Plan an Orgy in a Small Town	Adam Mitchell	Won – Canadian Filmmakers' Festival Award for Best Ensemble Cast (shared with cast)
2018	Clara	Charlie Durant	
2018	The Go-Getters	Cabbie	
2018	Nose to Tail	Mark	
2023	I Used to Be Funny	Noah	
2023	The Amityville Curse	Reverend Dave Marion	
2024	Fight Another Day	Gerrard	
2025	The Players	Luca	

=== Television ===
Year	TV show	Role	Notes
2003	Veritas: The Quest	Egyptian Guard	Episode: "Devil Child"
2003	Queer as Folk	Henry	Episode: "Doctors of Dickology"
2003	The Cheetah Girls	Comedian	TV movie
2005	Tilt	College Kid	Episode: "The Game"
2005	Kojak	Stewart	Episode: "Fathers and Sons"
2006	The Path to 9/11	Mohammed Salameh	Miniseries; 2 episodes
2006–2008	Billable Hours	Zoltan	Recurring; Nominated – Gemini Award for Best Ensemble Performance in a Comedy Program or Series (shared with cast) (2008)
2007	Trapped	Marc Creswell	Episode: "Hurricane Hotel"
2007	Snowglobe	Jamie DiBiasi	TV movie
2008	ReGenesis	Dr. Daniel Peters	Episode: "TB or not TB"
2008	Flashpoint	Frank	Episode: "Asking for Flowers"
2008	For the Love of Grace	Frank Lockwood	TV movie
2009	Unstable	Eric	TV movie
2009	The Border	Henry Masoud	Episode: "Missing in Action"
2009–2014	The Listener	Osman 'Oz' Bey	Series lead; 64 episodes Nominated – Canadian Comedy Award for Best Performance by a Male – TV (2010); Nominated – Canadian Comedy Award for Best Performance by a Male – TV (2011)
2010	Baxter	Mr. Harlow	Episode: "Trust Games"
2010–2011	Covert Affairs	CIA Polygrapher / Interrogator	Recurring; 4 episodes
2010, 2022	Murdoch Mysteries	Marcus Evans / Edwin Scantage	2 episodes
2011	Wipeout Canada	Himself	Co-host
2011	Good Dog	George's Agent	Episode: "I Never Met a Phor I Didn't Use"
2012	The L.A. Complex	Eddie Demir	Recurring
2013	Transporter: The Series	André	Episode: "12 Hours"
2013	Nikita	Guler	Episode: "High-Value Target"
2013	Republic of Doyle	Pete Donnelly	Episode: "Hook, Line and Sinker"
2014–2017	Red Oaks	Nash	Series regular 7th Canadian Screen Awards
2015	Man Seeking Woman	Leo	5 episodes
2015	Lost Girl	Philip	Episode: "Judgement Fae"
2015–2017	Dark Matter	Wexler	Recurring; 5 episodes
2015–2020	Blindspot	Gord Enver / Rich Dotcom	Recurring (seasons 1–3) Series regular (seasons 4 & 5)
2016	Brace for Impact	Moe	TV movie Nominated – Best Supporting Actor in a Television Film or Series – Canadian Screen Awards (2018)
2016	Baroness von Sketch Show	Mike	Episode: "Stay for a Drink"
2016	Shoot the Messenger	Bobby Ferguson	Episode: "There Will Be Blood"
2016–2020	You Me Her	Dave Amari	Recurring
2016–2021	Private Eyes	Kurtis Mazhari	
2018	Little Big Awesome	Various characters (voice)	
2019	Schitt's Creek	Emir Kaplan	3 episodes
2021	Frankie Drake Mysteries	Count Grigore	Episode: "Prince in Exile"
2021	Wynonna Earp	Kuru / Doug Warner	Episode: "Crazy"
2021	Nine Films About Technology	Rashid	Lead in stand-alone episode: "Story of a Phone"
2021	Roast Battle Canada	Himself	Host
2021	Hudson & Rex	Richie Lugo	Episode: "Oops I Bit It Again"
2021–2022	The Flash	Psych / Bashir Malik, Negative Psych	Recurring
2022–2023	Children Ruin Everything	Ennis	Series regular
2024	Sight Unseen	Kye	Recurring
2024–2026	Ghosts	Brett	3 episodes
2025	Law & Order Toronto: Criminal Intent	Kevin Russo	"The Man in the Stadium"
2025	Plan B	Manny	5 episodes
2026	Law & Order	Marius Cole	Episode: "The Enemy of All Women"
2026	Murdoch Mysteries	Ali Burk	"Off-Menu Murdoch"
