= That Burning Feeling =

2013 Canadian film

- Film poster
- Directed by: Jason James
- Written by: Nicolas Citton
- Produced by: Jason James; Marc Stephenson; Mary Anne Waterhouse
- Starring: Paulo Costanzo; Ingrid Haas; Tyler Labine; John Cho
- Cinematography: James Liston
- Edited by: Jamie Alain
- Music by: Andrew Harris
- Production companies: Resonance Film & Video; Sheep Noir Films
- Distributed by: Search Engine Films levelFilm
- Release date: September 29, 2013 (VIFF)
- Running time: 95 minutes
- Country: Canada
- Language: English

That Burning Feeling is a 2013 Canadian romantic comedy-drama film directed by Jason James. The film stars Paulo Costanzo as Adam Murphy, a womanizing hotshot real estate agent who is forced into a period of self-examination when he tests positive for gonorrhea and must track down his recent sexual partners to inform them; during the process, he also meets Liv (Ingrid Haas), a woman who may offer him the opportunity to start fresh in a serious long-term relationship.

The cast also includes Tyler Labine, John Cho, Rukiya Bernard, Jay Brazeau, Emily Hampshire, Julia Benson, Dalila Bela and Ona Grauer.

== Accolades ==
The film was co-winner with Jeff Barnaby's Rhymes for Young Ghouls of the award for Best Canadian Film at the 2013 Vancouver International Film Festival.
