= Becky Johnson =

Canadian comedian, writer, actress, improviser, craftsperson and organizer

Becky Johnson (born February 14, 1978) is a Canadian comedian, writer, actress, improviser, craftsperson and organizer.

== Early life ==
Johnson was born in Vancouver, British Columbia, on February 14, 1978, she attended Queen Elizabeth Annex Primary School, Ecole Jules Quesnel, Kitsilano Secondary School and Prince of Wales Secondary. While in high school, Johnson began studying and performing improvised comedy through the Canadian Improv Games. She was also involved in high school plays at Kitsilano Secondary School as well as being in the senior youth ensemble at Arts Umbrella where she performed in such plays as A.R. Gurney's The Dining Room.

Johnson moved to Blue Lake, California in 1998 to study full-time at the Dell'Arte International School of Physical Theatre.

== Career ==
Upon completion of her studies, Johnson moved to Toronto, Ontario, Canada, in 2000 to continue her work in clowning and non-literary theatre. In the next few years she co-founded a small physical theatre studio (Clown Hall), where she wrote and produced touring shows for her clown persona 'ruby', become a producer and featured performer for emerging live improv show Catch23 Improv, begin working with comedy collaborator Graham Wagner and act in an array of student and independent films.

=== Iron Cobra ===
In 2002, Johnson co-founded the improv comedy duo Iron Cobra with Graham Wagner. The duo was formed as an ad hoc team for the emerging Toronto-based competitive improv show Catch23 Improv and eventually moved on to larger shows, audio recordings and international touring. Iron Cobra toured to festivals in Atlanta, Edmonton, Minneapolis, Nashville, Vancouver, Winnipeg and Chicago with their particular brand of aggressive awkward comedy. Iron Cobra was nominated for one Canadian Comedy Award in 2004 as best improv troupe. They were also nominated for the local Tim Sims Encouragement Fund Award in 2004 and made their only television appearance as part of the attached Cream of Comedy show on the Canadian Comedy Network. Iron Cobra eventually disbanded officially in 2010 when Wagner moved to Los Angeles to pursue a career as a television writer. In that year, Johnson accepted Iron Cobra's first tour of Europe and ended up performing all shows solo. Iron Cobra's Without Graham European Tour was the last project done under the Iron Cobra name.

=== The Sufferettes ===
The Sufferettes is a multi-disciplinary comedy collaboration between Becky Johnson and Kayla Lorette. Mostly known for their improvised comedy, they formed loosely in 2008 and began touring internationally in 2011. The duo has toured to Edmonton, London, Berlin, Ljubljana, Vienna, Graz, Karlsruhe, Sarnen, Bochum and more.

Their two short videos, Kids and Crowns (2012) and Ben (2013) have both been official selections at comedy and underground film festivals like the Laugh Sabbath Film Festival at NXNE and the Sled Island Film Festival.

The Sufferettes were nominated for their first Canadian Comedy Award in 2014 as Best Improv Troupe.

=== Other improvised theatre ===
Johnson has served as co-producer for Catch23 Improv on-and-off since 2002. She has also served twice as artistic director for the sporadic Catch23 Tournament of Wonders, an invitational improv tournament and festival held in Toronto.

As an individual performer, Johnson has been nominated three times as Best Female Improviser at the Canadian Comedy Awards in 2003, 2004 and 2014.

=== Film, television and web series ===
Although trained and specialized in live performance, Johnson began acting in independent films, mostly directed by friends in film school. In the early 2000s, she collaborated with a collection of emerging directors including her high school friend and roommate, Hazel Bell-Koski and Bell-Koski's fellow film students at Ryerson Polytechnic University. The most prolific of these collaborations was with director Pat Mills with whom she worked on three projects over three years.

Early titles include: Secondary High (2002); The Water Game (2002); The Affected Turtleneck Trio (2001); I'm Not Martin! (2000); and Uranium (2004).

In 2007, Johnson had a small recurring part on the W Network series The Smart Woman Survival Guide.

From 2007 through 2012, Johnson took time off on-camera work to focus on her visual art and craft work, live performance, touring.

Johnson currently plays the roles of three degenerating clones (Deb 1, 2 & 3) on the CTV/iThentic comedy science fiction series Space Riders: Division Earth (2014 – ). She also makes short videos with her comedy duo, The Sufferettes.

=== Theatre and writing ===
In 2007, Johnson's solo play Anorexican received the Spotlight Award for outstanding performance at the SummerWorks Festival.

In 2010, Johnson was cast alongside Amy Rutherford in the European Premiere of Daniel MacIvor's A Beautiful View directed by Ross Manson for BeMe Theatre (Munich) and Volcano Theatre (Toronto). The production went on to have a run in Toronto and tour of Southern Ontario in 2014.

In 2013, Johnson was cast as Mrs. Sing, one of the leads in the world premiere of Sheila Heti's long-unproduced play All Our Happy Days Are Stupid directed by Jordan Tannahill for Suburban Beast. Although the production, mounted at Toronto storefront performance space Videofag, only seated twenty-eight audience members per performance, it garnered rave reviews and four nominations for Dora Mavor Moore Awards in the Independent Theatre Category (Best Ensemble, Best New Play, Best Production and Best Scenic Design). Johnson will reprise her role in 2015 for the play's American premiere at The Kitchen in New York City.

=== Art and craft ===
Through the early 2000s, Johnson published her own magazines and underground comics, which have been featured in Canada's Broken Pencil magazine.

== Awards and nominations ==
- NOW Toronto Best of Toronto Reader's Choice Award - Best Female Improviser (Winner)
- Canadian Comedy Award - Best Female Improviser (Nominee)

=== With Iron Cobra ===
- Canadian Comedy Award, Best Improv Troupe, 2005 (nominee)
- Tim Sims Encouragement Fund Award, 2004 (nominee)
- World Domination TheatreSports Championships, 2004 (winner)
