= Space Janitors =

Canadian web series

- Created by: Davin Lengyel; Geoff Lapaire
- Country of origin: Canada
- No. of seasons: 4
- No. of episodes: 29

Production
- Executive producer: Shaftesbury
- Production company: Space Mop

Original release
- Network: Geek & Sundry
- Release: November 14, 2012 – January 21, 2015
- Network: KindaTV
- Release: May 5 – June 12, 2024

Space Janitors is a Canadian web series. The show is a parody of the Star Wars franchise and the plot is focused on two janitors, Darby and Mike, on a space station. Season 1–3 is available through Geek & Sundry on YouTube. Season 4 premiered the May 5, 2024 on their KindaTV channel.

== Characters ==
Starring Brendan Halloran, Scott Ryan Yamamura, and Pat Thornton, Space Janitors centers around Social Group 417:

- Darby Richards (Brendan Halloran), a human custodian
- Dennis 4862 (Scott Ryan Yamamura) a human clone squall trooper
- Mike Chet (Pat Thornton), a human custodian
- Edith Kingpin (Evany Rosen), a computer psychologist first class
- Officer Emily Roarke (Helen Johns)
- LN6-K aka Elle (Tess Degenstein), an engineer second class
- Marf (Andy Hull)

== Production ==
The series was created by Davin Lengyel and Geoff Lapaire, digital media producers who were previously associated with the web and television series Pure Pwnage. It premiered in 2012.

Season 3 was partially funded as a Kickstarter project. The third season also received a theatrical screening at Toronto's Royal Cinema on January 9, 2015.

== Awards ==
The series is the recipient of a number of awards and nominations. Notably, they won Best Web Series at the Canadian Comedy Awards in 2013 and Best Original Program or Series, Fiction at the 2nd Canadian Screen Awards in 2014.

- Canadian Comedy Awards, 2013 (Internet / Best Web Series) – Winner
  - Cast & Crew Nominations: Best Direction, Best Male Performance, Best Ensemble Performance
- 1st Canadian Screen Awards, 2013 (Original Program or Series, Fiction) – Nominated
- 2nd Canadian Screen Awards, 2014 (Original Program or Series, Fiction) – Winner
- 4th Canadian Screen Awards, 2016 (Original Program or Series, Fiction) – Nominated

== Episodes ==
- 101 — Space Janitors Have Dreams Too
- 102 — Android Puke and Squall Trooper Training
- 103 — Light-Based Arm Cutter Instrument
- 104 — The Dark Lord: 53% Machine, Total Badass
- 105 — Fire Giant Laser
- 106 — Accidentally the Dark Lord
- 107 — Rebels Seem Like Nice Guys
- 108 — I'm a Fish?
- 201 — Escape to Desert Planet
- 202 — Holoroom
- 203 — Life Debt
- 204 — Wormhole
- 205 — Pyus Dunes
- 206 — Bounty Hunter
- 207 — Fish Planet, Part 1
- 208 — Fish Planet, Part 2
- 301 — Echoing Base
- 302 — Probe Droid
- 303 — Brain Wormed
- 304 — Haunted Heroes
- 305 — Hope Day
- 306 — Diplomacy
- 307 — Showdown, Part 1
- 308 — Showdown, Part 2
