= Linsey Stewart =

Canadian film director and screenwriter

Linsey Stewart is a Canadian film director and screenwriter from White Rock, B.C., most noted as co-director with her husband Dane Clark of the films I Put a Hit on You and Suze.

Clark and Stewart have also directed a number of short films, including Long Branch, Margo Lily and Bickford Park, and cocreated the web series The Commute.

Stewart, an alumnus of the Canadian Film Centre, has been a writer for the television series Being Erica, Mr. D and Workin' Moms.
