= The Sufferettes =

Canadian comedy duo

The Sufferettes are a Canadian comedy duo composed of Becky Johnson and Kayla Lorette.

== Performance history ==
The Sufferettes began performing together in 2008 as part of the weekly competitive improv show, Catch23 Improv, in Toronto.

In 2011, the Sufferettes began touring together internationally performing in such cities as London, Berlin, Vienna, Graz, Ljubljana, Sarnen, Bochum, Karlsruhe, Edmonton, Rochester and more.

== Awards and nominations ==
- Canadian Comedy Award 2014, Best Improv Troupe (Winner)
- Now Magazine Best of Toronto 2014, Improv Troupe (Winner)
