= Sex After Kids =

2013 film by Jeremy Lalonde

- Directed by: Jeremy Lalonde
- Written by: Jeremy Lalonde
- Produced by: Jeremy Lalonde; Jennifer Liao; Lori Montgomery; Jason Naggiar; Keri Peterson
- Starring: Zoie Palmer; Paul Amos; Mary Krohnert; Kate Hewlett; Jay Brazeau; Mimi Kuzyk; Katie Boland; Kris Holden-Ried; Amanda Brugel; Peter Keleghan; Shannon Beckner; Ennis Esmer; Gordon Pinsent
- Cinematography: Zach Melnick; Ann Tipper
- Edited by: John Nicholls
- Music by: Thomas Kratz
- Distributed by: Indiecan Entertainment
- Release date: 26 January 2013
- Running time: 105 minutes
- Country: Canada
- Language: English

Sex After Kids is a 2013 Canadian comedy film written and directed by Jeremy Lalonde. The film features an ensemble cast, and depicts various ways in which adults struggle to reconcile their sex lives with the demands of parenthood.

The film features an ensemble cast of characters, including Lou (Zoie Palmer), a single mother being encouraged by her brother Peyton (Paul Amos) to pursue casual sex; Larissa (Mary Krohnert) and Jody (Kate Hewlett), a lesbian couple whose relationship is being tested by frequent disagreements; Horton (Jay Brazeau) and Dolores (Mimi Kuzyk), middle-aged empty nesters trying to rekindle their sex lives after their adult daughter Markee (Katie Boland) moves out on her own; Gage (Kris Holden-Ried), a single father looking unsuccessfully for a perfect match; Vanessa (Amanda Brugel) and Sean (Peter Keleghan), a couple troubled by the fact that Sean now sees Vanessa as a mother rather than a sexual being; and Jules (Shannon Beckner) and Ben (Ennis Esmer), a couple struggling to revive their sex life after a year pause caused by having a baby. Gordon Pinsent appears as a sex therapist.

== Background and release ==
The film was funded in part by a crowdfunding campaign on Indiegogo, which raised over $61,000 from 345 donors.

The film premiered on January 26, 2013, at the Santa Barbara International Film Festival, and was screened at numerous Canadian film festivals, including the Calgary International Film Festival, the Edmonton International Film Festival and the Cinéfest Sudbury International Film Festival.
