= Space Riders: Division Earth =

Canadian science fiction comedy web series

Space Riders: Division Earth is a Canadian science fiction comedy web series, which premiered in 2014 on CTV Television Network's web platform CTV Extend. The series stars Mark Little and Dan Beirne as Ken and Phillip, two slackers who unexpectedly become superheroes after the Earth is invaded by alien supervillain Orson Ooze (Kayla Lorette). The series was generally labelled by critics as a parody of Mighty Morphin Power Rangers.

The series won the Canadian Screen Award for Best Original Program or Series Produced for Digital Media, Fiction at the 3rd Canadian Screen Awards in 2015, and the series won two Canadian Comedy Awards, for Best Web Series and Best Direction in a Web Series (Jordan Canning) at the 16th Canadian Comedy Awards. Following the second season's airing in 2017, Lorette was a Canadian Screen Award nominee for Best Lead Performance in a Web Program or Series at the 7th Canadian Screen Awards in 2019.
