= Derek Harvie =

Canadian TV and film writer and producer (born 1971)

Derek Kevin Harvie
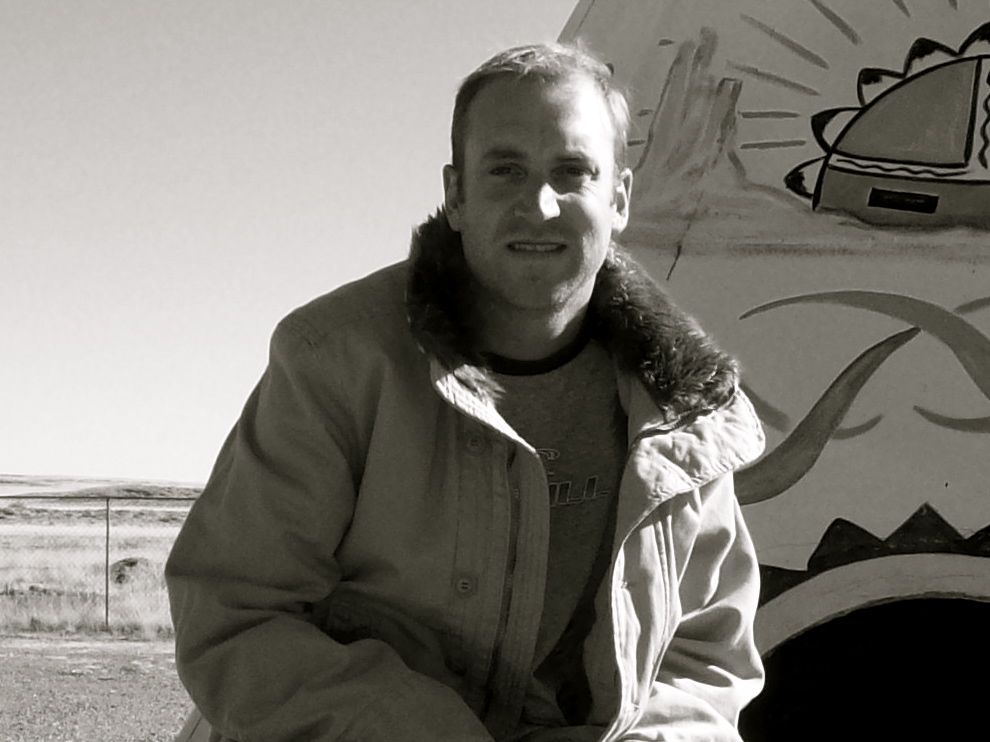
- Derek Harvie in Petrified Forest, Arizona
- Born: April 7, 1971 (age 55); Deep River, Ontario, Canada
- Occupations: Television and film writer, director, producer, and showrunner
- Years active: 1994–present

Derek Kevin Harvie (born April 7, 1971) is a Canadian TV and film writer and producer.

== Early life and education ==
Harvie grew up in Ottawa and graduated from the University of Toronto with a degree in film and literature.

== Career ==
An original creator and writer/producer of The Tom Green Show on its Canadian community channel run, Harvie continued to write and produce the show for The Comedy Network from 1996 to 1998 and MTV from 1999 through 2003.

In 2001, Harvie and Tom Green co-wrote the 20th Century Fox and New Regency feature Freddy Got Fingered. The pair won the Golden Raspberry Award for worst screenplay.

His special MTV documentary, The Tom Green Cancer Special, was named by Time magazine as "one of the ten best TV programs of the year" in 2001. The show was also nominated for a Peabody Award.

Harvie has worked on numerous other comedy shows, including WB's The Skateboard Show, VH1's Hollywood Tonight and NBC's Saturday Night Live.

In 2008, Harvie was showrunner and executive producer of the half-hour sitcom Testees on FX Networks. Both Harvie and co-writer Kenny Hotz received 2009 Gemini Award nominations for Best Comedy Writing and Best Comedy Series.

In 2008 and 2009, Derek Harvie wrote for Kenny vs. Spenny for Comedy Central.

In 2009, Harvie showran the half-hour series Pure Pwnage, a scripted comedy about the life of a "pro gamer". Harvie and show creators Geoff Lapaire and Jarett Cale received a 2010 Gemini Award nomination for Best Comedy Series.

In 2010, Harvie wrote and co-executive produced the US version of Skins on MTV Networks.

In 2011, Harvie wrote for the second season of the UK series "Beaver Falls", a one-hour dramedy on E4. He also wrote for Joan Rivers' reality show "Joan Knows Best" on WE TV.

In 2013, Harvie adapted the UK (All3Media) scripted/hidden camera comedy series "Meet the Parents" then went on to write, produce and direct two seasons of Meet the Family for Citytv/Frantic Films.

In 2016, Harvie developed a stand-up comedy series featuring LA radio personality Big Boy for iHeartMedia and Studio71. He also produced and directed several projects for Vice Media; All Things Human and Getting an Election which won a Canadian Comedy Award for Best Short. He wrote and directed the scripted comedy series "You Got Trumped" for Blackpills which imagines the first few days of Donald Trump's presidency.

Derek Harvie is Creator/Showrunner/Executive Producer of Bajillionaires. A half-hour single-cam comedy about teenage best friends running their own invention company out of the garage. Bajillionaires is produced by Six Eleven Media, distributed by DHX Media and aired for 2 seasons on Family Channel and NBC Universal Kids.
