= Convos with My 2 Year Old =

YouTube web series

Convos with My 2 Year Old is a YouTube web series and channel. The series was created by Matthew Clarke and is sponsored by GEICO and produced by CocoMilk Productions (originally known as Warmland Films).

== Synopsis ==
Each episode contains a true-to-life conversation that Matthew Clarke had with his daughter, Coco Frances Harrison-Clarke, and in later seasons, his son, Shepherd Harrison-Clarke. Matthew Clarke is cast as himself, but his children are portrayed by Clarke's friends David Milchard and Michael P. Northey, who are dressed similarly to their roles in each episode. Clarke's family, Coco, Shepherd, and his wife Leila Harrison, have all made numerous cameos in the web series cast. The captions "Actual conversations with my 2 year old daughter..." appear at the beginning of each episode. (Note: In season 2 and 3 of the series, the "2" in the original captions was replaced with a "3" because Clarke's daughter had turned 3 years old. In season 4 and 5, the "3" changed to a "4" because she had turned 4 years old. But in season 6, Shepherd made his first appearance at two years old when Coco was five. In episodes featuring Coco, the "4" was changed to a "5," while episodes featuring Shepherd was reverted to the original "2", and episodes featuring both children usually depended on who made the first appearance. Then, in Season 7, the "2" changed to a "3" because Shepherd was three years old.) "As re-enacted by me and another full grown man" appears at the beginning of each episode.

== Cast ==
- David Milchard as Coco Frances Harrison-Clarke
- Michael P. Northey as Shepherd Harrison-Clarke
- Matthew Clarke as himself
- Coco Frances Harrison-Clarke as herself
- Shepherd Harrison-Clarke as himself
- Leila Harrison as herself

== Episode list ==
Episodes in the YouTube Series:

Episode	Episode in Season	Title	Upload Date	Plot
1	1	"Convos with My 2 Year Old – Episode 1"	May 21, 2013	Coco won't let her parents talk to each other.
2	2	"Convos with My 2 Year Old – Episode 2"	May 29, 2013	Coco comes in to Matthew's bedroom to read a story.
3	3	"The Cookie"	June 12, 2013	Coco convinces Matthew to give her a cookie.
4	4	"The Check"	June 19, 2013	Coco poos her pants.
5	5	"Playtime"	June 26, 2013	Coco and Matthew play together.
6	6	"The Pants"	July 10, 2013	Coco doesn't want to put her pajamas on.
7	7	"The Pants - Part II"	July 17, 2013	Coco won't let Matthew put her pajamas on her.
8	8	"Come On, Let's Play"	July 24, 2013	Coco tries to get Matthew to play with her.
9	1	"Dinner Time"	September 15, 2013	Coco wants to watch a movie instead of eating dinner.
10	2	"Make the Bed"	October 2, 2013	Matthew tries to teach Coco how to make a bed.
11	3	"The Princess Dolls"	October 16, 2013	Coco plays with her princess dolls.
12	4	"Fashion"	October 30, 2013	Coco criticizes her parents' outfits.
13	5	"Bath Time"	November 13, 2013	Coco takes a bath.
14	6	"Leaves"	November 20, 2013	Matthew and Coco play in the forest.
15	7	"Doctor"	December 4, 2013	Coco pretends to be a doctor and Matthew is her patient.
16	8	"The Slide"	December 18, 2013	Coco is too scared to go down a slide.
17	1	"Convos with My 2-Year-Old - Season 3, Episode 1 - 'The Crack'"	April 30, 2014	Coco's bum crack shows.
18	2	"Mother's Day Special!"	May 7, 2014	Coco makes her mother some food.
19	3	"The Day After Tomorrow"	May 14, 2014	Coco tries to find out when her birthday is.
20	4	"Dreams"	May 28, 2014	Coco asks Matthew about his dream.
21	5	"Big/Small"	June 4, 2014	Matthew and Coco talk about their sizes.
22	6	"Electricity"	June 25, 2014	Matthew and Coco pass a power generator.
23	7	"The Elevator"	July 2, 2014	Coco and another girl race to press the elevator buttons. (Note: The other girl is played by Shay Carl's daughter, Avia. Shay Carl also makes a cameo as the girl's father.)
24	8	"Coffee Table"	July 9, 2014	Coco won't let Matthew give away their coffee table.
25	1	"Bed Time-Part 1"	November 5, 2014	Coco is too tired to go to sleep.
26	2	"Chicken Phone"	November 12, 2014	Coco tries to help Matthew write a story.
27	3	"Toto"	November 19, 2014	Coco can't say her name.
28	4	"Car Pee Diem"	November 26, 2014	Coco has to pee several times during her car ride.
29	5	"Zebras"	December 3, 2014	Coco looks for zebras in the forest.
30	6	"Swimming"	December 10, 2014	Coco goes swimming.
31	7	"Shopping"	December 17, 2014	Coco's parents tell her she can't buy something from the mall.
32	8	"Bed Time-Part 2"	December 24, 2014	Coco is too tired to go to sleep.
33	1	"Of Bikes and Ants"	June 17, 2015	Coco steps on an ant during her bike ride.
34	2	"13 and a Half"	June 24, 2015	Coco pretends to be a princess who is 13 and a half years old.
35	3	"Friends"	July 1, 2015	Coco loses a friend.
36	4	"Fore"	July 8, 2015	Matthew and Coco play golf.
37	5	"Cat"	July 15, 2015	Coco asks her parents for a cat.
38	6	"Public Bathroom"	July 22, 2015	Coco and Leila visit a public bathroom.
39	7	"Monkey Bars"	July 29, 2015	Coco attempts to climb the monkey bars.
40	8	"Shark!"	August 5, 2015	Matthew and Coco pretend to be attacked by a shark.
41	9	""Butterfly" - Bonus Episode!!"	August 19, 2015	Coco pretends to be a butterfly.
42	1	"Karate"	November 11, 2015	Coco tries to teach herself karate.
43	2	"Asking Nicely"	November 18, 2015	Shepherd tries to take Matthew's Ukulele.
44	3	"Batman Song"	November 25, 2015	Shepherd, Coco and Matthew can't agree on what music to play on Matthew's phone.
46	4	"I Can Do It by Myself"	December 2, 2015	Coco begins to do things without Leila's help.
47	5	"Sleeping"	December 9, 2015	Coco and Shepherd both want to sleep with Matthew and Leila.
48	6	"Convos Case Files - Episode 1"	December 16, 2015	Coco and Matthew join the "Toddler Police Department". (Note: The CONVOS CASE FILES series is fictional.)
49	7	"Convos Case Files - Episode 2 - 'Stroller Case' "	December 23, 2015	Coco and Matthew chase a father and his child who stole a lollipop whilst dealing with problems with a mother of the same division.
50	8	"Convos Case Files - Episode 3 - 'The Case of the Missing Dinosaur' "	December 30, 2015	Coco and Matthew have to solve a mystery of a missing "dinosaur."
51	1	"Charades"	June 1, 2016	Coco, Matthew and Shepherd play Charades.
52	2	"The Future"	June 8, 2016	Coco asks Matthew questions about the future.
53	3	"The Cookie Part 2"	June 15, 2016	Shepherd has the same conversation with Matthew that Coco did in the episode, "The Cookie".
54	4	"Calm Down"	June 22, 2016	Coco, Shepherd, Matthew and Leila get into several arguments during a car ride.
55	5	"Yes I Did/No You Didn't"	June 29, 2016	Coco tells her friend (Note: Olive Collingwood, played by Viv Leacock.) a story that her friend doesn't believe.
56	6	"Almost Convos with My Wife"	July 6, 2016	A Montage of interruptions Matthew and Leila go through trying to talk to each other because of Coco and Shepherd.
57	7	"What I Want"	July 13, 2016	Coco throws a tantrum because Matthew won't buy her Shopkins.
58	8	"Travel"	July 20, 2016	The Harrison-Clarke family come off a plane from Los Angeles.

== Reception ==
In an interview with The Huffington Post, Clarke expressed that his idea for the web series came after he had a conversation with his daughter and realized that if she were bigger or an adult, the things that she stated would more than likely be unacceptable to say. Clarke also stated, in an interview with the Daily Dot, that much of the humor is satirical: "Kids have this natural vulnerability about them, they’re these innocent, pristine creatures, in a selfish narcissistic way...David doesn’t have that. When you take away that innocence and you’re left with the narcissistic, selfish qualities, it highlights the absurdity of these interactions." The series also highlights the sort of relationship that parents can have with their toddlers.

Convos with My 2 Year Old became a success with nearly 800,000 subscribers. However it is difficult to pinpoint exactly when it became popular as the owner of the Convos with 2-Year-Old channel has disabled viewers from seeing the stats of the first few episodes. The series has a majority of YouTube "Likes" rather than "Dislikes" and all have more than 44,000 views each. The first episode of the series has more than 12,000,000 views and is the most-viewed out of the series. It is difficult to come across negatives about series because the YouTube channel deletes any negative comments on any of the videos and most articles are positive towards the series.

The series has no definite type of viewer, but it can be observed to be favored by an audience of parents with families. Many articles about the web series are under the "Family" and "Parents" category.

== Sources ==
- Petersen, Sarah (September 27, 2013). "Father and 2-year-old daughter Coco accidentally create viral YouTube series together". Deseretnews.com. Archived from the original on September 29, 2013.
