= Frantic Films =

- Official logo.
- Type: Private corporation
- Industry: Television series and television films
- Genre: Reality; Drama; Documentary; Docuseries
- Founded: 1997
- Founder: Ken Zorniak; Chris Bond
- Headquarters: Manitoba, Canada
- Key people: Ken Zorniak (president); Chris Bond (producer)
- Parent: The Frantic Company Limited
- Divisions: Frantic Films CGI Studio
- Subsidiaries: Red Apple Entertainment
- Website: https://franticfilms.com/

Frantic Films Corporation is a Canadian branded content and live action production company based in Winnipeg, Manitoba. Frantic Films is known for producing live action reality shows, documentaries and for its work in feature film visual effects.

== History ==
Frantic Films was founded in 1997 by Ken Zorniak and Chris Bond. The company initially produced work for commercial clients such as Procter & Gamble and created computer-generated imagery (CGI) for Stephen King's Storm of the Century.

In 2001, Frantic Films attracted international attention after creating stunning visual effects sequences for the blockbuster film Swordfish. Also in 2001, Frantic Films founded a research and development division that focussed on creating software and tools for future visual effects projects. The division produced a large suite of in-house and commercial software. Early efforts were focused on Deadline (a commercial render farm management tool) and Flood (an in-house fluid simulation tool). In 2004, Flood was said to be one of the top three fluid simulation tools in the world.

In 2002, Jamie Brown joined Frantic Films as a partner.

In 2007, the visual effects and software R&D divisions were acquired by the Prime Focus Group. As a result, Frantic Films stopped all visual effects and previsualization projects and refocused on live action and branded content. In 2010, the Frantic Films co-founder Chris Bond started a new company called Thinkbox Software and reacquired the software R&D division back from Prime Focus Group. Thinkbox Software has since been acquired by Amazon Web Services and most of the commercial software launched by Frantic Films remains in active development.

In 2009, Frantic Films acquired Red Apple Entertainment, enabling rights over Red Apple's syndication catalog and mode of production.

In 2017, the special-purpose acquisition company, Kew Media Group, spent $108 million buying Canadian production companies, among them Bristow Global Media, Our House Media and Frantic Films. in 2020, Brown financed a deal for Frantic Films to buy back its shares from Kew Media Group.

== Branded content ==
The branded content division, Frantic Branded Content, specializes in creating original integrated entertainment for traditional and emerging media platforms. In 2009, Frantic Branded Content partnered with the advertising agency TAXI and commercial the production company Soft Citizen to produce the branded entertainment television property Commercial Break.

== Live action (past and current) ==
- High Maintenance
- Stand!
- Killer in Plain Sight
- Into Invisible Light
- The Writers' Block
- The Stats of Life
- Indictment: The Crimes of Shelly Cartier
- Backyard Builds
- Baroness von Sketch Show
- Still Standing
- Meet the Family
- Winnipeg Comedy Festival
- Buy It, Fix It, Sell It
- Pitch'n In
- Todd and the Book of Pure Evil
- A pitchn' In Christmas
- Verdict
- Til Debt Do Us Part
- Keep Your Head Up Kid: The Don Cherry Story
- Breakbound
- Devil's Brigade
- Guinea Pig
- Music Rising
- Retail
- Princess
- Of All Places

== Visual effects and previsualization (past) ==
- Alien: Resurrection (1997) – visual effects contributed to DVD release
- Swordfish (2001) – visual effects
- The Italian Job (2003) – previsualization, visual effects
- X2 (2003) – previsualization, visual effects
- Paycheck (2003) – visual effects
- The Core (2003) – visual effects
- Resident Evil: Apocalypse (2004) – visual effects
- Catwoman (2004) – previsualization, visual effects
- Scooby-Doo 2: Monsters Unleashed (2004) – visual effects
- Cursed (2005) – visual effects
- Poseidon (2006) – previsualization
- X-Men: The Last Stand (2006) – previsualization
- Superman Returns (2006) – visual effects, software development
- Mr. Magorium's Wonder Emporium (2007) – visual effects
- Journey to the Center of the Earth (2008) – visual effects
- Runaway (2009) – visual effects
