= Dane Clark (filmmaker) =

Canadian filmmaker

Dane Clark is a Canadian film director and screenwriter from Peterborough, Ontario, most noted as co-director with his wife Linsey Stewart of the films I Put a Hit on You and Suze.

Clark and Stewart have also directed a number of short films, including Long Branch, Margo Lily and Bickford Park, and cocreated the web series The Commute.

Clark, an alumnus of the Canadian Film Centre, also wrote the screenplay for the 2012 film Old Stock, and has been a writer and story editor for the television series Mr. D and Run the Burbs.
