= Canadian Comedy Awards =

National awards for performed comedy

- 2010 trophy
- Awarded for: Best comedy works of previous year
- Location: Toronto
- Country: Canada
- First award: 2000
- Website: canadiancomedyawards.org

The Canadian Comedy Awards (CCA) is an annual ceremony that awards the Beaver for achievements in Canadian comedy in live performance, radio, film, television, and Internet media. The awards were founded and produced by Tim Progosh in 2000.

The CCA have been held in different cities, most often in Toronto and London, Ontario. Between 2003 and 2015, the awards were held as part of the Canadian Comedy Awards Festival, with showcase performances by nominees and other comedic talent. The Comedy Network broadcast the first two award ceremonies and several specials of festival performances. These broadcasts have earned two Gemini Award nominations.

The awards are artist-driven with a mandate "To recognize, celebrate and promote Canadian achievements in comedy at home and abroad." They are run through a non-profit organization and volunteer committees, drawing membership from the Alliance of Canadian Cinema, Television and Radio Artists (ACTRA), the Canadian Actors' Equity Association (CAEA), the Directors Guild of Canada (DGC), the Writers Guild of Canada (WGC), and the Comedy Association. Some awards are determined by industry members while others are open to public voting.

== History ==
Actor, director and producer Tim Progosh founded the Canadian Comedy Awards (CCA) after touring for over 20 years in sketch, improv and stand-up comedy. He felt that there was a distance between stand-up comedians and other comedic artists, and that stand-up and comedy as a whole wasn't receiving adequate national recognition. With the establishment of The Comedy Network in late 1997, Progosh felt the time was right to create a national comedy award and comedy hall of fame.

Progosh brought together an advisory board which included himself, Mark Breslin of Yuk Yuk's comedy clubs, Andrew Alexander of The Second City, Sydd Capp, and representatives from the Alliance of Canadian Cinema, Television and Radio Artists (ACTRA), the Canadian Actors' Equity Association (CAEA), the Directors Guild of Canada (DGC) and the Writers Guild of Canada (WGC). Award categories were created for live comedy, film and television, with the mandate "To recognize, celebrate and promote Canadian achievements in comedy at home and abroad."

Philanthropist Bluma Appel helped to establish the awards, and supported a bursary for emerging comics. Breslin noted that it was the first time "that anyone from the Canadian establishment took comedy seriously." The first Canadian Comedy Awards ceremony was held in 2000 at Toronto's Masonic Temple. The Comedy Network televised the first two annual awards ceremonies, but due to lack of sponsorship the broadcast deal ended in 2001.

In 2003, non-profit organization the Canadian Comedy Foundation for Excellence (CCFE) was incorporated to organize and promote the awards, and the ceremonies moved from Toronto to London, Ontario. The CCFE also organized the Canadian Comedy Awards Festival (CCAF), with showcase performances by the nominees in sketch, stand-up and improvisational comedy, workshops, seminars and special events leading up to the awards gala. As the festival grew during the following years, The Comedy Network began broadcasting Best of the Fest variety specials.

Following sponsorship, the CCFA moved to Regina, Saskatchewan, in 2008 and Saint John, New Brunswick, in 2009. The awards then returned to Toronto, which could more easily accommodate the festival which then had 38 shows over five days. During this period, categories were also broadened and added to recognize emerging media such as podcasts and web series. In 2013, the awards moved to Ottawa and had its first francophone presence at the festival.

In 2015, the license for the awards expired and control of the Canadian Comedy Awards reverted to the trademark holder, Funny Business, Inc. During this same period, Progosh and the CCFE decided to focus on creating a home for the Canadian Comedy Hall of Fame. The awards were put on hold until the spring of 2016. Due to budget and time limitations, the industry award categories were suspended for the transitional year and only the public voting categories were considered. Two additional public categories – Best Live Production and Best Live Ensemble – were added to compensate for the lack of industry categories. The 18th awards similarly covered an 18-month eligibility period and were held in 2018. Thereafter, the awards returned to a yearly schedule, considering the works of the previous calendar year.

== Governing body ==
Until 2015, the CCA were organized by the Canadian Comedy Foundation for Excellence (CCFE), a non-profit corporation registered in 2003. Its volunteer committees sought input from comedy professionals on all aspects of the awards: criteria, marketing, programming and communications.

The Membership and Communications Committee promoted industry awareness and participation in the awards, oversaw all communications to and from the membership, and advised and coordinated with media coverage. The Nominations and Awards Committee oversaw the nomination process, category criteria, jury committees, voting procedures, trophies and prizes. The Programming Committee developed programs and organized talent for various events, the awards gala, and community events.

The CCA membership is made up of industry professionals, largely from the following member organizations:

- Alliance of Canadian Cinema, Television and Radio Artists (ACTRA) – represents 22,000 performers in English-language media.
- Canadian Actors' Equity Association (CAEA) – represents 6,000 professionals in English Canadian theatre, including actors, dancers, opera singers, theatre directors, choreographers and stage managers.
- Writers Guild of Canada (WGC) – represents 2,200 professional writers in English-language film, television, radio, and digital media.
- Directors Guild of Canada (DGA) – represents 4,800 professionals in 48 occupations in film and television
- The Comedy Association – represents talent, workers and management of comedy clubs and festivals (including Yuk Yuk's, The Second City, and Just for Laughs).

== Awards and categories ==
Writing on the inaugural awards ceremony, Alan Neister described the trophies as "Plexiglas maple leaves, etched with the outline of a happy, dancing beaver." In some ceremonies, awards have been given for being "pretty funny" in each category instead of "best". As of the 2018 ceremony, the CCA has awarded a total of 393 Beavers.

The number of award categories recognized at each ceremony has most often been between 19 and 24, though categories added for Internet and multimedia works saw the categories peak at 30 in the mid-2010s. Time and budget limitations resulted in the categories being reduced to 9 in 2016. Following this transitional year the number of categories was streamlined to 22, largely by combining the award categories for male and female performers.

Categories are divided by format, organized into those for live performances (including stand-up, improvisation, and plays), television, and film. Internet media was added in 2008 and categories that considered works across different formats were labelled as multimedia.

=== Current categories ===
Public voting categories:

- Comedic Artist of the Year (since 2008)
- Best Live Production (since 2016)
- Best Taped Live Performance (since 2005)^{A}
- Best Live Ensemble (since 2016)
- Best Standup Comic (since 2000)^{B}
- Best Variety Act (since 2014)^{A}
- Best Breakout Artist (since 2013)^{A}
- Best Feature (since 2011)
- Best TV Show (since 2011)
- Best Web Series (since 2012)
- Best Short (since 2013)
- Best Audio Show or Series (since 2012)
- Best Comedy Album (since 2017)

Industry voting categories:

- Best Performance in a Feature (since 2000)^{A}^{C}
- Best Writing in a Feature (since 2000)^{A}
- Best Direction in a Feature (since 2000)^{A}
- Best Performance in a TV Series (since 2000)^{A}^{C}
- Best Writing in a TV Series or Special (since 2000)^{A}^{D}
- Best Direction in a TV Series or Special (since 2000)^{A}^{D}
- Best Performance in a Web Series (since 2014)^{A}^{E}^{F}
- Best Writing in a Web Series (since 2014)^{A}^{F}
- Best Direction in a Web Series (since 2014)^{A}^{F}

Notes:

^A not awarded in 2016, a transitional year
^B awarded separately to male and female performers, 2001–2015
^C awarded separately to male and female performers, 2000–2015
^D awarded separately for series and specials, 2000–2009
^E awarded separately to male and female performers, 2014–2015
^F web series and TV series had shared direction, writing and performance categories in 2013

=== Discontinued categories ===
- Best Radio Program or Clip (2008–2013), Best Audio Clip (2014)
- Best Stand-up, Large Venue (2008 only)
- Best Stand-up Newcomer (2000–2012, replaced with Best Breakout Artist)
- Best Sketch Troupe (2000–2015, merged into Best Live Ensemble)
- Best Improv Troupe (2001–2015, merged into Best Live Ensemble)
- Best Newcomer, Sketch Troupe (2000 only)
- Best Male Improviser (2001–2015)
- Best Female Improviser (2001–2015)
- Best Live Performance Male (2000 only)
- Best Live Performance Female (2000 only)
- Best Playwriting (2000 only)
- Best Direction, New Play (2000 only)
- Best Direction, Existing Play (2000 only)
- Best New Play (2001–2002)
- Best One Person Show (2001–2015, merged into Best Live Production)
- Best Comedic Play, Revue or Series (2003–2015, merged into Best Live Production)
- Best Television Performance by an Ensemble (2009–2012)
- Best Ensemble Performance in a TV or Web Series (2013 only)
- Best Film Writing, Adapted (2000 only)
- Best Original Screenplay (2000 only)
- Best Web Clip (2008–2012, replaced with Best Short)

=== Special award categories ===
Juried categories were discontinued in 2016. These panels had previously given awards for special achievement including lifetime achievement awards and awards for non-artists who had made significant contributions to Canadian comedy. The juries also inducted people into the Canadian Comedy Hall of Fame.

- The Bluma Appel "That's Funny" Award (2001) established by philanthropist Bluma Appel (d.2007).
- Chairman's Award (2004–2010)
- Dave Broadfoot Award (2004–2014) for comic genius, named for Canadian comedy pioneer Dave Broadfoot (1925–2016) and established by the Royal Canadian Air Farce.
- Phil Hartman Award (2012–2015) for an individual "who makes the Canadian comedy community better". Established in honour of Canadian-American comic, actor and screenwriter Phil Hartman (1948–1999), it has been awarded to open mic host Jo-Anna Downey, and comedians Mike MacDonald, Kenny Robinson, and producer Joe Bodolai who helped found The Comedy Network.

=== Canadian Comedy Hall of Fame ===
The CCA established the Canadian Comedy Hall of Fame and inducted its first members in 2000. In 2013, a permanent home was sought for the Canadian Comedy Hall of Fame and the CCA presented proposals to the cities of Hamilton, Niagara Falls, and Ottawa, Ontario. The cities declined due to uncertainties of funding. The Just for Laughs Museum in Montreal had closed in 2011 after operating at a loss.

The proposal had called for an interactive museum with a comedy club for performances. In lieu of a permanent museum, interactive exhibits were set up at ByWard Market during the 2014 CCAF, and school groups were invited to participate in workshops.

== Nominations and voting ==
Nominees for a CCA must be Canadian citizens or landed immigrants, have been born in Canada or have produced the majority of their work in Canada. Other criteria varied year by year, but generally the eligibility period was the previous calendar year; works had to have premiered in Canada during that period and live performers had to have performed in Canada at least once during that period. In some years there was a nominal fee for the first person to nominate a person or work; in 2018 this fee was $20.

From 2000 to 2015, the nomination process involved about 170 jury members selected each year by the CCFE. The jury members, whose identities were kept secret, would vote on the nominees submitted through the CCA website. Their top five selections in each category would become the final nominees, voted on by the CCA membership. The jury's votes were weighted for about 30% of the final result.

Voting was conducted online since 2000, making the CCA one of the first national awards in Canada to have online voting. Two-minute clips of nominees were made available online, allowing nominees to gain exposure across the industry.

Public voting was introduced by 2008, initially limited to a few categories. In 2016, time and budget issues precluded organizing any industry-voting categories, so public-voting was expanded to nine categories. When industry awards returned the following year, rather than a jury there were two rounds of voting. In the first round, members chose up to five nominees for each category; these were totalled and the top five became the final nominees for a second round of voting.

== Ceremonies and festivals ==
The awards ceremonies have been described as placing "gags over glamour", with wit and improvisational skill shown by hosts, presenters and recipients. Leatrice Spevack of The Globe and Mail noted that the CCAs stood above other award shows on its entertaining acceptance speeches.

=== Festivals ===
CCA Festivals were held each year from 2002 to 2015. The festivals took place over three to five days, depending on sponsorship and the availability of talent, volunteers, and venues. The awards ceremony was held either on the final evening, or on the second-last evening with a Last Laughs Gala on the final night. The largest festivals had two to three dozens events, with more than one hundred performers. Comedy shows featured the nominees and comics from the host region, with stand-up, sketch, improv and one-person shows, competitive improvisational games, seminars, workshops, and interactive exhibits. Some festivals have also included celebrity hockey games with comedians and alumni of the host city's professional hockey team.

=== Host cities and venues ===
Cities in Ontario have hosted all but two of the CCA award ceremonies. Toronto has most frequently hosted the awards, including the first ceremony and the most recent, in 2019. Galas have been held at historic venues including the Masonic Temple, the Winter Garden Theatre, the Isabel Bader Theatre, and the Imperial Room of the Royal York hotel, and at clubs The Guvernment and The Docks. CCAF events have been held at the city's comedy clubs including Yuk Yuk's, Second City, Comedy Bar, and Bad Dog Theatre, and showcase performances have been held at the Panasonic Theatre.

London hosted the longest run of the awards, from 2003 to 2007. The CCA Festival began during this period, growing from three to five days of events. The CCA were hosted by Ottawa for two years, with the awards ceremony held at Centrepointe Theatre in 2013 and the Ottawa Little Theatre in 2014. Other CCAF venues in the nation's capital included Yuk Yuk's, Absolute Comedy, Arts Council Theatre, Bell Sensplex, and ByWard Market.

Regina, Saskatchewan, hosted the awards and festival in 2008. In 2009, the festival was hosted by Saint John, New Brunswick, with the awards ceremony and Last Laugh Gala held at the Imperial Theatre.

=== Telecast ===
The first awards ceremony was held at Toronto's Masonic Temple, which CTV Television Network had equipped as a television studio in the late 1990s. The ceremony was recorded for television, produced by Higher Ground Productions and directed by Bob Sorger. A one-hour version of the ceremony was broadcast on CTV at midnight on the night of Friday 7 April 2000, with the full program airing on The Comedy Network on 9 April at 9 pm. The special was well received by the members of the industry it represents, who awarded Sorger the Beaver for best direction of a TV special or episode in 2001. The 2001 ceremony was also televised and was nominated for a Gemini Award for best writing in a comedy or variety program.

In 2001, Bell Globemedia (now Bell Media) became the sole shareholder of The Comedy Network, and decided to discontinue sponsoring and televising the awards ceremony.

In 2006, a gala review which closed the CCA Festival was taped and broadcast by The Comedy Network. The following year, showcase performances were taped and aired by The Comedy Network as two variety specials. The Doo Wops – John Catucci and David Mesiano – were nominated for a Gemini Award for Best Ensemble Performance in a Comedy Program for Canadian Comedy Awards 2007: Best of the Fest. In 2008, another Best of the Fest special was taped and broadcast by The Comedy Network.

In 2009, for the 10th CCA, The Comedy Network taped the awards ceremony and Last Laugh Gala for later broadcast. The Comedy Network also taped The Canadian Comedy Awards 10th Anniversary Special, featuring Beaver-winning comedians from the past decade; this special was broadcast in May 2010.

The Comedy Network drew criticism in 2013 for broadcasting the American Comedy Awards but not the CCAs. Some felt that the national comedy channel should produce its own programming and help develop and promote domestic talent, rather than importing programming from the US.

== Associated events ==
Various other shows have been organized under the Canadian Comedy Awards banner. These include the charity shows Canadian Comedy Award Nominees vs. Cancer, fundraisers for local charities, and benefits for comics suffering from illness. The CCA has also organized comedy shows for other performing arts festivals, such as Canada's Walk of Fame Festival.

== Criticism ==
=== Francophone exclusion ===
It is noticeable that the CCA is focused on English Canada. In part this is due to the groups which make up its industry membership. ACTRA, the Canadian Actors' Equity Association, and the Writers Guild of Canada exclusively represent English Canada and English-language productions. The Directors Guild of Canada has uneven representation in Quebec where certain film and television professions are represented by other unions.

Quebec comedians had been holding their own award ceremony, Gala Les Olivier (named after Olivier Guimond) for two years at the time of the CCA's creation.

Francophone acts were first included at the CCA Festival in 2013, when the Awards were first held in Ottawa, a largely bilingual city on the Ontario–Quebec border.

The bilingual film Bon Cop, Bad Cop won three Beavers in 2007: for direction, writing and best male performance. Bilingual comic Mike Ward won Comedic Artist of the Year in 2016, and quadrilingual comic Martha Chaves won Best Standup Comic in 2018.

=== Absent categories ===
The absence of a comedy album category was noted through most of the CCAs. Though historically important, comedy albums had fallen into decline in the 1980s and 1990s. Breslin explained poor album sales as a result of the dissemination of comedy through cable TV, the availability of concert videos which could be rented for less than the price of an album, and a general shift toward visual media. Although the mainstream audience moved away from albums, reduced production costs allowed comedy albums to go underground with niche-market material, such as that deemed too political or too explicit for television. Following a 17-year absence, the CCAs included a Best Comedy Album category in 2017. The following year, the Juno Awards revived an award for Comedy Album of the Year, which had been discontinued after 1984.

It was also noted that there was an absence of categories for humour published in print media. The CCAs have focused on the performing arts, while humour in Canadian literature has been recognized by the Stephen Leacock Memorial Medal for Humour.
