= 13th Canadian Comedy Awards =

Festival and awards ceremony for works of 2011

- Date: 26 August 2012
- Location: Fairmont Royal York; Toronto, Ontario
- Country: Canada
- Presented by: Canadian Comedy Foundation for Excellence
- Hosted by: Alan Thicke

Highlights
- Most wins: Television: Picnicface (3); Film: Roller Town (3)
- Most nominations: Television: Michael: Tuesdays and Thursdays (7); Film: French Immersion (5); Internet: Comedy Bar (3) (5); Radio: The Debaters (2); Person: Ron Sparks (5)
- Website: www.canadiancomedyawards.org

The 13th Canadian Comedy Awards, presented by the Canadian Comedy Foundation for Excellence (CCFE), honoured the best live, television, film, and Internet comedy of 2011. The ceremony was held at the Fairmont Royal York Hotel in Toronto, Ontario, on 26 August 2012 and was hosted by Alan Thicke.

Canadian Comedy Awards, also known as Beavers, were awarded in 26 categories. Winners in 5 categories were chosen by the public through an online poll and others were chosen by members of industry organizations. The awards ceremony concluded the Canadian Comedy Awards Festival which ran from 23 to 26 August.

The TV series Michael: Tuesdays and Thursdays led with seven nominations followed by the bilingual film French Immersion with five. They each won a Beaver for best male performance. The big winner was Halifax-based comedy troupe Picnicface, which won three Beavers for their eponymous TV series and three for their debut film, Roller Town. This ceremony also introduced the Phil Hartman Award which went to Jo-Anna Downey.

== Festival and ceremony ==
The 13th Canadian Comedy Awards (CCA) was held in Toronto, Ontario. The gala awards ceremony was held on 26 August 2012 in the Imperial Room of the Fairmont Royal York Hotel. The ceremony was produced by Gary Rideout, Jr. and hosted by Alan Thicke, a veteran actor who at that time was the honorary chair of Canadians Abroad, a group that organized Canadian events in Los Angeles.

Each nominee for Best TV Show had already been cancelled. This was played-up in a video inspired by Billy Crystal's Oscar montages, where Gavin Crawford visited the cancelled shows' empty sets, was faced with his own cancelled shows, and was replaced as CCA host by Thicke. Also entertaining at the ceremony were Seán Cullen and Colin Mochrie.

The awards ceremony concluded the four-day Canadian Comedy Awards Festival which ran from 23 to 26 August, showcasing performances by nominees at various Toronto venues. Many stand-ups also took part in a 27 August AltDotComedy Lounge show at The Rivoli.

== Winners and nominees ==
Nominees were announced on 7 June 2012 in Toronto, and voting took place between 14 June and 29 July. Members of the Canadian public voted for the categories Canadian Comedy Person of the Year, Best TV Show, Best Film, Best Web Clip, Best Web Series, Best Podcast, and Best Radio Program or Clip, with industry members deciding the remaining categories. There was record participation, with 88% more public voting and 113% more industry members voting compared to 2011.

This year's ceremony introduced the Phil Hartman Award for "an individual who makes the Canadian comedy community better." The award went to long-time Toronto open-mic night host Jo-Anna Downey. Awards were also introduced for podcasts and web series, giving this ceremony more award categories than any previous year.

Winners are listed first and highlighted in boldface:

=== Multimedia ===
Canadian Comedy Person of the Year	Best Radio Program or Clip
**Nikki Payne**; Gerry Dee; Kenny Hotz; Martin Short; Steve Patterson	**This Is That**; Am I Right?; Anything Goes – "Guy Earle Controversy" (Note: Anything Goes is a podcast hosted by Darren Frost and Dave Martin.); The Debaters – "Fast Food" (Alan Park & Ron Sparks); The Debaters – "Breaking Up" (Laurie Elliott & Phil Hanley)
Best Podcast
**Stop Podcasting Yourself**; Hold Your Applause; Illusionoid (Note: The Illusionoid podcast is an improvised serial by Paul Bates, Lee Smart and Mike Nahrgang.); The SeanPod; The Sunday Service Presents: A Beautiful 45

=== Live ===
Best Taped Live Performance	Best Stand-up Newcomer
**Mark Forward** – **The Late Late Show with Craig Ferguson**; Steve Patterson, Seán Cullen, Pete Johannson, Derek Edwards, Nathan Macintosh – The Debaters – "Tea vs. Coffee, Too Many TV Channels"; Nathan Macintosh – Comedy Now!; Darrin Rose – Comedy Now!; Graham Chittenden – Comedy Now!	**Steve Patrick Adams**; Heidi Brander; Josh Williams; Julie Kim; Tom Henry
Best Male Stand-up	Best Female Stand-up
**Ron Sparks**; Dave Merheje; Mark Forward; Pete Zedlacher; Ron Josol	**Kristeen von Hagen**; Allison Smith; Christina Walkinshaw; DeAnne Smith; Kate Davis
Best Male Improviser	Best Female Improviser
**Matt Baram**; Alastair Forbes; Mark Meer; Ryan Beil; Taz VanRassel	**Rebecca Northan**; Caitlin Howden; Dale Boyer; Sarah Hillier; Stacey McGunnigle
Best Sketch Troupe	Best Improv Troupe
**Falcon Powder**; Hot Thespian Action; Jape; Peter N' Chris; Uncalled For	**The Sunday Service**; 2-Man No-Show; Blind Date on Tour; M and M Improv; Mantown
Best One Person Show	Best Comedic Play, Revue or Series
**Sex, Religion & Other Hang-ups** (Note: Sex, Religion & Other Hang-ups is a one-person show by James Gangl.); ELLAmentary; Mickey & Judy; The Best of The Newsdesk with Ron Sparks; The Cockwhisperer: A Love Story	**Blind Date** (Note: Blind Date is Rebecca Northan's improvised stage show.); Celebrity Roasts with Ron Sparks; Hypnogogic Logic; Rap Battlez!; The Script Tease Project

=== Television ===
Best TV Show	Best Performance by an Ensemble
**Picnicface**; Almost Heroes; The Debaters; Michael: Tuesdays and Thursdays; Todd and the Book of Pure Evil	**Picnicface**; Jason Priestley, Donavon Stinson, Ernie Grunwald, Peter MacNeill, Tracy Dawson – Call Me Fitz; Ken Finkleman, Lolita Davidovich, Samantha Bee, Jason Weinberg, John Ralston, April Mullen, Stephanie Mills, Janet van de Graaf, Stephen McCarthy, Jud Tyler, Brendan Gall, John White, Doug Murray – Good God; Jesse Camacho, Benjamin Arthur, Wendel Meldrum, Nancy Sorel, Brooke Palsson – Less Than Kind; Bob Martin, Matt Watts, Tommie-Amber Pirie, Pablo Silveira, Jennifer Irwin – Michael: Tuesdays and Thursdays
Best Performance by a Male	Best Performance by a Female
**Bob Martin** – **Michael: Tuesdays and Thursdays**; Ryan Belleville – Almost Heroes; Pat Thornton – Comedy Bar; Darrin Rose – Mr. D; Bill Turnbull – Todd and the Book of Pure Evil	**Lauren Ash** – **Almost Heroes**; Samantha Bee – Good God; Tommie-Amber Pirie – Michael: Tuesdays and Thursdays; Naomi Snieckus – Mr. D; Amy Matysio – Single White Spenny
Best Direction in a Program or Series	Best Writing in a Program or Series
**Mark McKinney** – **Less Than Kind** episode 313, March Fourth; Adam Brodie, Dave Derewlany – Funny as Hell; Kenny Hotz, Sebastian Cluer – Kenny Hotz's Triumph of the Will; Don McKellar – Michael: Tuesdays and Thursdays; Craig David Wallace – Todd and the Book of Pure Evil	**Andrew Bush, Garry Campbell, Kyle Dooley, Cheryl Hann, Mark Little, Brian Macquarrie, Evany Rosen, Scott Vrooman, Bill Wood** – **Picnicface**; Russell Peters, Clayton Peters, Luciano Casimiri, Kristeen von Hagen, Jean Paul – A Russell Peters Christmas; Ken Finkleman – Good God; Bob Martin – Michael: Tuesdays and Thursdays; Matt Watts – Michael: Tuesdays and Thursdays

=== Film ===
Best Performance by a Male	Best Performance by a Female
**Gavin Crawford** – **French Immersion**; Robb Wells – Beat Down; Boomer Phillips – Bounty Hunters a.k.a. Bail Enforcers; Pardis Parker – The Dance; Winston Spear – The Trial	**Jocelyne Zucco** – **Funkytown**; Marthe Bernard – Beat Down; Brigitte Kingsley – Dark Rising: Summer Strikes Back; Oluniké Adeliyi – French Immersion; Carolyn Bennett – The Trial
Best Direction	Best Writing
**Andrew Bush** – **Roller Town**; Deanne Foley – Beat Down; Brett Blackwell – Boss of Me; Kevin Tierney – French Immersion; Kevin McDonald, Ron Sparks – The Trial	**Scott Vrooman, Mark Little, Andrew Bush** – **Roller Town**; Jefferson Lewis, Kevin Tierney – French Immersion; Rob Baker, Dale Boyer, Adam Cawley, Chris Earle, Brian G. Smith – Live from the CenTre: Animal Literacy Group; Paolo Mancini, Thomas Michael – Running Mates; Pardis Parker – The Dance
Best Film
**Roller Town**; Dark Rising: Summer Strikes Back; French Immersion; Long Branch; The Trial

=== Internet ===
Best Web Series	Best Web Clip
**The Casting Room**; Comedy Bar; Goodbye Sara Hennessey; Scott Thompson's Fruit Blog; Sexy Nerd Girl	**Riverdale: The Archie Movie Trailer**; Acting Real; Call Me Dad; Comedy Bar – "Makin' a Show"; The Fish Bride

=== Special awards ===
Dave Broadfoot Award	Phil Hartman Award
**Colin Mochrie**	**Jo-Anna Downey**; Colin Mochrie; Eric Toth; Joey Flaherty & David Flaherty; Kate Davis
Roger Abbott Award	**Jo-Anna Downey**; Colin Mochrie; Eric Toth; Joey Flaherty & David Flaherty; Kate Davis
**Simon Fraser**	**Jo-Anna Downey**; Colin Mochrie; Eric Toth; Joey Flaherty & David Flaherty; Kate Davis

== Multiple wins ==
The following people, shows, films, etc. received multiple awards

Awards	Person or work
3	Picnicface
3	Roller Town

== Multiple nominations ==
The following people, shows, films, etc. received multiple nominations.

Nominations	Person or work
7	Michael: Tuesdays and Thursdays
5	French Immersion
4	The Debaters (Radio & tv)
4	The Trial
3	Beat Down
3	Comedy Bar
3	Good God
3	Picnicface
3	Todd and the Book of Pure Evil
2	Almost Heroes
2	The Dance
2	Darrin Rose
2	Kevin Tierney
2	Mr. D
2	Nathan Macintosh
