= Everyone's Famous =

Canadian comedy web series

- Genre: comedy
- Created by: Andrew Bush
- Starring: Ryan Beil; Kayla Lorette; Pat Thornton; Kyle Hickey; Molly Dunsworth; Cory Bowles; Kevin Kincaid
- Country of origin: Canada
- No. of seasons: 1
- No. of episodes: 7

Production
- Producers: Walter Forsyth; Angus Swantee

Original release
- Network: web series CBC Television
- Release: 2013 – 2013

Related
- Picnicface, Cavendish

Everyone's Famous is a Canadian comedy web series, which premiered in 2013. Created by Andrew Bush of the sketch comedy troupe Picnicface, the series stars Ryan Beil as Donald Tipper, an unhappy call centre employee who tries to reinvent himself as a creator of online viral videos. The cast also includes Kayla Lorette, Pat Thornton, Kyle Hickey, Molly Dunsworth, Cory Bowles and Kevin Kincaid.

The series consists of seven episodes. All seven episodes were also subsequently reedited into an hour-long comedy special, which aired on CBC Television on July 6, 2013.

The series garnered two Canadian Screen Award nominations at the 2nd Canadian Screen Awards, in the categories of Original Program or Series Produced for Digital Media, Fiction and Performance in a Program or Series Produced for Digital Media (for Pat Thornton).
