= Picnicface =

Canadian sketch comedy troupe

Picnicface was a Canadian sketch comedy troupe based in Halifax, Nova Scotia, consisting of Mark Little, Andrew Bush, Kyle Dooley, Cheryl Hann, Brian MacQuarrie, Evany Rosen, Scott Vrooman and Bill Wood. Formed in 2006, the group were most noted for their viral video "Powerthirst", which was followed by a 13-episode sketch comedy television series on The Comedy Network in 2011.

== Work ==
In addition to performing across Canada, the group had a special on CBC Radio and a weekly sketch and improv comedy show in Halifax.

In 2011, Picnicface was featured in the film Roller Town and a satirical book about Canada for HarperCollins Canada, Picnicface's Canada.

== Television series ==
Picnicface
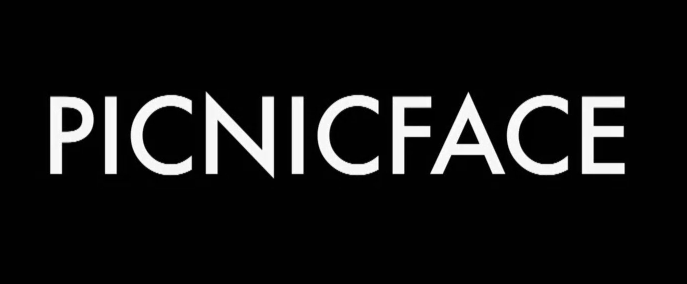
- Genre: Sketch comedy
- Starring: Andrew Bush; Kyle Dooley; Cheryl Hann; Mark Little; Brian MacQuarrie; Evany Rosen; Scott Vrooman; Bill Wood
- Opening theme: "Hope For It" by Rich Aucoin
- Country of origin: Canada
- Original language: English
- No. of seasons: 1
- No. of episodes: 13

Production
- Running time: 22 mins.
- Production company: Breakthrough Entertainment

Original release
- Network: The Comedy Network
- Release: August 31 – December 14, 2011

Related
- Roller Town; Everyone's Famous; Cavendish

Thirteen episodes of a sketch comedy series, Picnicface, were ordered by The Comedy Network in 2010. The series aired in the Wednesday 10:30 pm Eastern/9:30 pm time slot in 2011. Picnicface was executive-produced by Mark McKinney from The Kids in the Hall.

The series won three Canadian Comedy Awards at the 13th Canadian Comedy Awards in 2012, for Best TV Series, Best Ensemble and Best Writing in a TV Series.

In late April 2012, Bell Media, the network's owner, decided not to renew the series for a second season.

=== Episodes ===
No.	Title	Directed by	Written by	Original release date	Prod. code
1	"Part Time Jobs"	Vivieno Caldinelli & Andrew Bush	Picnicface	September 21, 2011	101
Brian goes on a journey across Canada to Vancouver when he learns that the show is not making any money. As a result, the group has to get part-time jobs. Bill gets a job as a urinal mascot for a toilet store, Evany becomes an Air Traffic Controller, Scott and Kyle become lumberjacks, and Andrew along with Cheryl become police officers, where Cheryl shoots Andrew's hand. Meanwhile, Mark receives money from random people on the street. By the end of the episode everybody gets fired, and Mark becomes their new landlord, who decides after a heart attack, to let them stay at the house.
2	"Contest Winner"	Vivieno Caldinelli & Andrew Bush	Picnicface	September 28, 2011	102
In the second episode "Contest Winner," Picnicface announces the winner of their #1 fan contest, Jordan Talbot. The lucky guy joins the troupe at their house and in their sketches (Contest winning was exactly how Bill Murray got his start BTW.) There are also imaginary Jewish Grandparents, an exposé on Hawaiian Pop Music, and an ad for a fantastic new Country album.
3	"Affirmative Action"	Vivieno Caldinelli & Andrew Bush	Picnicface	October 5, 2011	103
Brian is replaced by Gord, a Native American of the Mi'kmaq Nation, when the producers decide that there is not enough ethnic diversity in the troupe. Gord writes and stars in several sketches speaking of minority representation and Aboriginal history. Meanwhile, Bill and Evany try to convince Andy that they are minorities. When Brian falls and loses the use of his legs, he becomes the minority of the group, getting Gord kicked out of the troupe. There is also an exposé on trivial board games, an unintelligible presentation on trucks, and tan pants.
4	"How We Met"	Vivieno Caldinelli & Andrew Bush	Picnicface	October 12, 2011	104
The gang recount how they met each other while Evany is in surgery. It is revealed that Mark, Andrew and Kyle met while Kyle and Mark were trying to steal the same babies Andrew was trying to steal, and started the troupe a couple of years ago. Bill and Cheryl met as the babies who Andrew, Mark, and Kyle were trying to steal, and Brian and Scott, met while Brian was renting a cottage in the country. It turns out that Evany was in fact giving birth to a child, whom she promptly sells to Kyle, Andrew, and Mark. There is also Riddlesnake, who is a man with a tail and amazing dance moves, and a man who teleports whoever he high fives to the bathroom of an elderly man, and some truly great horse stats.
5	"Demographics"	Vivieno Caldinelli & Andrew Bush	Picnicface	October 19, 2011	105
The group gets the results of focus group testing conducted by the network, which shows that Andy is especially popular with viewers older than 65. Now labeled "the old one," Andy decides to prove how young he is through a series of extreme stunts, such as chugging his own urine and skateboarding into the other cast members. Meanwhile, a battle of cereals begins after Victor Life Cereal puts baby deer in his cereals and challenges Gregory Cheerio. This results in cereal company owners putting more and more ridiculous things in their cereals. Two elderly men have a Pooty Party, Scott tests his hypothesis that adding cats makes videos funnier, and a man develops an addiction to mercy killing animals.
6	"Storybook"	Vivieno Caldinelli & Andrew Bush	Picnicface	October 26, 2011	106
A grandpa reads to his grandchildren some classic stories such as The Stabby Murder Mystery, Nick Jay’s, and The Haunted House, wherein the characters never really go to a haunted house, from The Tome of All Stories. The "kids" Evany and Bill do not really like any of them. After other stories about guys talking about ladies' pants, impromptu chants, the kids go into the stories. Where they steal burgers, pants, muffins, and accidentally shoot the real life Brian. Taking advantage of the situation, Andrew and Mark decide to shoot their Weekend at Bernie's sketch, with Mark as Bernie. When Brian is finally brought to the hospital, the actors become confused, and Mark freaks out about it. This is the ending of The Tome of All Stories.
7	"Premium Membership"	Vivieno Caldinelli & Andrew Bush	Picnicface	November 2, 2011	107
The audience is encouraged to sign up for a "premium membership" in order to access extra material, high-definition footage and the end of certain sketches. Later, it is revealed that the actor promoting the premium memberships in the various commercials has a hard life and is overworked by the group, as we see him head home after a shoot. While there, he discovers his son was in a car accident, but of course, if the audience wishes to see how it ends, they have to sign up for a premium membership.
8	"Old Footage"	Vivieno Caldinelli & Andrew Bush	Picnicface	November 9, 2011	108
9	"Karaoke"	Vivieno Caldinelli & Andrew Bush	Picnicface	November 16, 2011	109
Evany decides she wants to go to karaoke for her birthday but no one else wants to go (aside from Cheryl) because they all hate her and think she is fat, opting instead to do a puzzle. At karaoke, the pair's duet of the Canadian National Anthem is interrupted by creepy imagery involving the group and ends with Cheryl stabbing Evany. When they get home, the group reveals that they have re-created the "Bird-Day" prophecy (in slow motion) and Evany stabs Cheryl preemptively. In the hospital, Cheryl is in recovery and Brian is stuck in slow-motion. It's revealed that they did not finish the puzzle as a single piece was missing. The final piece is then put into place by a mysterious hand and the picture is shown to be the group gathered around Cheryl in the hospital, mourning her death, and we hear her flatline in the background.
10	"Fan Mail"	Vivieno Caldinelli & Andrew Bush	Picnicface	November 23, 2011	110
The group gets some future fan mail from the future postman and it is discovered that while Mark becomes the favorite of the show over the next three seasons, he is eventually murdered in season 4. To deal with this, Mark goes to the house of his future murderer, creating his own stalker. Later, Evany is revealed to be a future cocaine addict after being mailed some coke, which Mark promptly steals. While waiting for the bus, Mark meets his stalker Alphonso and gives him his jacket, which gets him arrested when a drug-sniffing dog finds the stolen coke. Alphonso then swears he will kill Mark when he gets out of prison. Additionally, Kyle gives birth to a fan's child.
11	"Popularity"	Vivieno Caldinelli & Andrew Bush	Picnicface	November 30, 2011	111
After Mark blows $30,000 on a promotional newspaper ad that reads "Rent RoboCop" the group has to come up with creative ways to promote themselves, while on a budget. These plans include promotional arson, celebrity kidnappings and Andrew hunting Brian on a live Internet feed. In the end, only Bill's carrier doves are successful, with the troupe becoming the most popular comedy group in Mexico.
12	"Time Machine"	Vivieno Caldinelli & Andrew Bush	Picnicface	December 7, 2011	112
13	"Dreams"	Vivieno Caldinelli & Andrew Bush	Picnicface	December 14, 2011	113

== Later work ==
In 2013, Bush created the comedy web series Everyone's Famous, which received two Canadian Screen Award nominations at the 2nd Canadian Screen Awards. In 2018, Bush and Little created and starred in the comedy series Cavendish, which premiered on CBC Television in January 2019.

Rosen was one of the creators, alongside Kayla Lorette, of the comedy web series New Eden.
