= Cupcake & Dino: General Services =

Canadian-Brazilian animated television series

- Genre: Adventure; Comedy
- Created by: Pedro Eboli
- Developed by: Mark Satterthwaite
- Directed by: Pedro Eboli
- Voices of: Justin Collette; Mark Little; Kyle Dooley; Mark Forward; Joris Jarsky; Julie Lemieux; Kayla Lorette; Julie Sype
- Theme music composer: Bedtracks Inc.
- Opening theme: "Opening Theme" by Bedtracks Inc.
- Composer: Bedtracks Inc.
- Countries of origin: Brazil; Canada
- Original languages: English; Portuguese
- No. of seasons: 2
- No. of episodes: 26 (52 segments)

Production
- Executive producers: Olivier Dumont; Randi Yaffa; Luciana Eguti; Pedro Eboli; Paulo Muppet
- Producer: Tristan Homer
- Running time: 22 minutes (11 minutes per segments)
- Production companies: Birdo Studio; Entertainment One; Corus Entertainment

Original release
- Network: Netflix (international); Teletoon (Canada); Disney XD (Brazil)
- Release: July 27, 2018 – May 3, 2019

Cupcake and Dino: General Services (or Cupcake e Dino: Serviços Gerais in Portuguese) is an animated television series created by Pedro Eboli for Teletoon in Canada, Disney XD in Latin America, and Netflix in the United States.

The series follows the life of Cupcake and Dino, two brothers who strive to make a name for themselves in the General Services (odd jobs) business. It was released to Netflix on July 27, 2018.

The second season was released on May 3, 2019.

== Premise ==
Cupcake & Dino: General Services revolves around a tiny cupcake and his giant dinosaur brother as they strive to make a name for themselves in the competitive General Services business (known in Brazil as "bicos"). There is a supporting cast of other anthropomorphized food, objects, animals, and mythical creatures, as well as humans. There is no apparent reason or distinction between different types of characters, with Cupcake and Dino being presented as birth siblings and having a Grandma Steak and a human uncle.

Episodes follow the loose format of Cupcake and Dino taking on a general services job where unintended consequences usually follow absurd plot points. Each episode also has repeated basic themes found in young children's programming such as friendship, honesty, bravery, and loyalty—often accompanied by simple songs emphasizing these themes.

The series was animated using Adobe Animate and utilizes live-action sequences that were recycled from Shutterstock, which the crew used with permission.

== Characters ==
=== Main ===
- Cupcake B. Goody (voiced by Justin Collette) is an anthropomorphic magenta cupcake with a Napoleon complex, and Dino's older brother.
- Dinosaur Carol Goody (voiced by Mark Little) is a yellow and friendly Tyrannosaurus rex who is Cupcake's fun-loving, optimistic younger brother.

=== Recurring ===
- Hugo (voiced by Mark Forward) is Cupcake and Dino's lovable manager and assistant.
- Chance Goody (voiced by Kyle Dooley) is Cupcake and Dino's human uncle and Grandma Steak's son.
- Vicky (voiced by Julie Sype) is the teenage mayor of Big City and a friend of Cupcake and Dino.
- Grandma Steak (voiced by Julie Lemieux) is Cupcake and Dino's feisty grandmother and Chance Goody's mother.
- Peetree Gluck the Third (voiced by Joris Jarsky) is a rooster with a southern accent and Cupcake and Dino's rival.
- Sneaky Stan (voiced by Kyle Dooley) is Chance Goody's grocery store rival.
- Officer Bees (voiced by Kayla Lorette) is a bee police officer.

=== Minor characters ===
- Angles, a robot-house hybrid who first appeared in the first half of the first episode of the first season of Cupcake and Dino: General Services.
- Inventory Ariel
- Kattycorn, a half cat and half unicorn who only appears in S1 E5.
- Chris (the Manygoose)
- Creature Magazine Editor
- Blur Guy
- Mr. Grumbles
- Pigeon
- The Internet
- Bun and Iguana
- Pickles (Officer Bees' pet cat)
- Cassie, a green caterpillar that emerged into a teenage butterfly.

== Episodes ==
=== Series overview ===
Season	Episodes	Originally released
1	13	July 27, 2018
2	13	May 3, 2019

=== Season 1 (2018) ===
No.	Title	Directed by	Written by	Original release date	Canadian air date	Prod. code
1a	"The Manly Men's Man Club"	Pedro Eboli	Mark Satterthwaite & Mark Little	July 27, 2018	September 3, 2018 (sneak peek); September 8, 2018 (official)	101
Cupcake becomes obsessed with joining a men's club after Peetree mocks him and Dino for not being manly enough.
1b	"Mi Casa, Robo Casa"	Pedro Eboli	Mark Satterthwaite & Mark Little	July 27, 2018	September 3, 2018 (sneak peek); September 8, 2018 (official)	102
Cupcake and Dino take on a housesitting job for a futuristic self-sufficient house only to be trapped inside by the house's lonely artificial intelligence.
2a	"Cupcake Days"	Pedro Eboli	Mark Little	July 27, 2018	September 3, 2018 (sneak peek); September 8, 2018 (official)	103
Mayor Vicky tasks Cupcake and Dino with tracking down a stolen statue during the city's Cupcake Days celebration.
2b	"My Brother, My Headband"	Pedro Eboli	Craig Martin	July 27, 2018	September 3, 2018 (sneak peek); September 8, 2018 (official)	104
Dino questions his identity after he loses his favorite sweatband in a sinkhole.
3a	"Mozoko"	Pedro Eboli	Mark Little	July 27, 2018	September 15, 2018	105
Dino learns he has an innate ability to play a complicated card game when he and Cupcake volunteer at Grandma Steak's retirement home.
3b	"The Pizza Man Always Rings 6000 Times"	Pedro Eboli	Kathleen Phillips	July 27, 2018	September 15, 2018	106
Cupcake and Dino become professional pizza delivery men to help keep their favorite pizza place from going out of business.
4a	"Goody Family 101"	Pedro Eboli	Kyle Dooley	July 27, 2018	September 15, 2018	107
Cupcake and Dino learn about their distant ancestors when Uncle Chance asks them to fix up the old family float for the Big City Small Business Parade.
4b	"The Manygoose"	Pedro Eboli	Mark Little	July 27, 2018	September 15, 2018	108
Cupcake and Dino befriend a mythical creature called the Manygoose in the woods and embark on a rescue mission when it is caught and sold to the circus.
5a	"Everybody Loves Kattycorn"	Pedro Eboli	Mark Satterthwaite	July 27, 2018	September 22, 2018	109
Dino hires a temp named Kattycorn to help with general service jobs while Cupcake is sick in bed with a nasty cold but Cup grows jealous when he believes Kattycorn is planning to replace him permanently.
5b	"Know Your Nemesis"	Pedro Eboli	Doug Hadders & Adam Rotstein	July 27, 2018	September 22, 2018	110
Uncle Chance becomes furious when he accidentally encourages the boys to take a job working with his arch-nemesis, Sneaky Stan.
6a	"Talent Show Biz"	Pedro Eboli	Stephanie Kaliner	July 27, 2018	September 22, 2018	111
Cupcake and Dino help Mayor Vicky hone her singing skills for the upcoming talent show.
6b	"Retrieval Boys"	Pedro Eboli	Mark Little	July 27, 2018	September 22, 2018	112
Hoping to be showered in praise, Cupcake and Dino hunt down a mysterious criminal who is stealing all of the books in Big City.
7a	"Cupcake's Big Surprise"	Pedro Eboli	Nick Flanagan	July 27, 2018	September 29, 2018	113
Cupcake believes he has figured out the birthday surprise that Dino has planned for him.
7b	"Growing Pains"	Pedro Eboli	Joel Buxton	July 27, 2018	September 29, 2018	114
Cupcake and Dino take care of Mayor Vicky's pet caterpillar, Cassie, to prove to Uncle Chance that they're responsible enough to have a pet of their own. However, the duo soon finds themselves overwhelmed when Cassie becomes a rebellious teenage butterfly.
8a	"Inventory Day"	Pedro Eboli	Doug Hadders & Adam Rotstein	July 27, 2018	September 29, 2018	115
After neglecting their inventory work, Cupcake and Dino are forced to navigate the Goody Bag's labyrinthine basement to save Uncle Chance from a vengeful former employee.
8b	"Cupsy"	Pedro Eboli	Kyle Dooley	July 27, 2018	September 29, 2018	116
Cupcake becomes a pretentious artist after a local millionaire praises his hedge trimming ability.
9a	"My Two Dinos"	Pedro Eboli	Craig Martin	July 27, 2018	October 6, 2018	117
After learning that he's too small to drive in the annual Big City dune buggy race, Cupcake uses Dino's shed skin to create a suit that makes him bigger.
9b	"Believe in the Paperboys"	Pedro Eboli	Doug Hadders & Adam Rotstein	July 27, 2018	October 6, 2018	118
Cupcake and Dino become paperboys and discover all the stories written in the local tabloid newspaper are true.
10a	"My Life in Radio (Stinks!)"	Pedro Eboli	Mark Satterthwaite	July 27, 2018	October 6, 2018	119
Cupcake and Dino become famous after taking over the night shift at Big City Radio but upset Uncle Chance when they reveal a secret of his on air.
10b	"Internet vs. Everybody"	Pedro Eboli	Jeff Sager	July 27, 2018	October 6, 2018	120
Cupcake, Dino and Mayor Vicky discover the wonders of nature while searching for the internet after she decides to take an unexpected vacation that leaves Big City offline.
11a	"All That Snazz"	Pedro Eboli	Kathleen Phillips	July 27, 2018	October 13, 2018	121
Uncoordinated Cupcake tries to lead a dance troupe to victory.
11b	"Live, Love, Lemonade"	Pedro Eboli	Joel Buxton	July 27, 2018	October 13, 2018	123
While babysitting, Cupcake and Dino inspire a boring little girl to become a big shot lemonade mogul.
12a	"Cupcake, Dino & The Treasure of Tikiluki"	Pedro Eboli	Kyle Dooley	July 27, 2018	November 17, 2018	124
The guys try to make their favorite action star's boring life more exciting.
12b	"Hu's the Boss"	Pedro Eboli	Aron Dunn	July 27, 2018	November 17, 2018	125
Chance leaves Hugo in charge of the store, but C and D get in the way.
13a	"Christmas Is Cancelled"	Pedro Eboli	Mike Girard	July 27, 2018	November 3, 2018	126
Cupcake and Dino help Mayor Vicky save Christmas after nobody in Big City receives gifts on Christmas Eve. However, in order to help Cupcake must first overcome his fear of Santa.
13b	"Ice Station Dino"	Pedro Eboli	Mike Girard	July 27, 2018	November 3, 2018	122
On a snowy day, Cupcake and Dino take a break from their toothpick packing job to play outside, but the duo gets caught up in a snow war when Peetree and his army of snow shovelers threaten to destroy their snow fort.

=== Season 2 (2019) ===
No. overall	No. in season	Title	Directed by	Written by	Original release date	Canadian air date	Prod. code
14a	1a	"Cupcake & Dino Go Hollywood"	Pedro Eboli	Kyle Dooley	May 3, 2019	January 4, 2019	TBA
The boys go Hollywood as actors in a movie directed by a coffee pot.
14b	1b	"Barbershop Duet"	Pedro Eboli	Brendan Halloran	May 3, 2019	January 4, 2019	TBA
Dino steps up when the town needs a barber, but he is not too great with scissors.
15a	2a	"Skull Peninsula"	Pedro Eboli	Kyle Dooley	May 3, 2019	January 11, 2019	TBA
Cupcake battles pirates for butter so Dino can free his backside from a crevice.
15b	2b	"We Are The Pile"	Pedro Eboli	Kathleen Phillips	May 3, 2019	January 11, 2019	TBA
Cupcake starts a junk collection that takes on a life of its own.
16a	3a	"Snail Score"	Pedro Eboli	Jon Davis	May 3, 2019	TBA	TBA
The boys bet with Peetree to see who got more notes than in an available app.
16b	3b	"Be Your Best Boo"	Pedro Eboli	Josh Sager & Jerome Simpson	May 3, 2019	TBA	TBA
On Halloween, Dino learns to scare everyone in the Big City.
17a	4a	"Kindergarten Cup"	Pedro Eboli	Jeff Sager	May 3, 2019	TBA	TBA
Cupcake and Dino get replacement teachers and compete with Peetree to see if they are better teachers than him.
17b	4b	"Uncle Chance: General Servicer"	Pedro Eboli	Kyle Dooley	May 3, 2019	TBA	TBA
After a slug dedetization at the Market, Uncle Chance does general services with Cupcake and Dino.
18a	5a	"Ultimate Dino"	Pedro Eboli	Mark Little	May 3, 2019	TBA	TBA
To replace Peetree, Dino plays the bee team on the discus thrower.
18b	5b	"Slumber Sisters"	Pedro Eboli	Mike Girard	May 3, 2019	TBA	TBA
After arranging a sleepover as a general service and being expelled, Cupcake and Dino enter undercover at a sleepover.
19a	6a	"Little Mister Big City Pageant"	Pedro Eboli	Kyle Dooley	May 3, 2019	TBA	TBA
Cupcake pretends to be a baby to win a miss.
19b	6b	"Follow the Leader"	Pedro Eboli	Craig Martin	May 3, 2019	TBA	TBA
Dino becomes the leader of a tribe of gnomes by mistake.
20a	7a	"Gavin Moonboom & Princie Baba"	Pedro Eboli	Jeff Sager	May 3, 2019	TBA	TBA
Cupcake and Dino found that their idols broke up.
20b	7b	"Cupcake & Dino Are on the Lam"	Pedro Eboli	Kyle Dooley	May 3, 2019	TBA	TBA
The boys make an escape after they ruined an old photo of Uncle Chance.
21a	8a	"Rest Now, Dino"	Pedro Eboli	Aaron Eves	May 3, 2019	TBA	TBA
Dino helps everyone on their day off, but when the general service routine returns, He has no more energy to work with.
21b	8b	"Cupcake & Dino Are Catsitters!"	Pedro Eboli	Kyle Dooley	May 3, 2019	TBA	TBA
The boys take care of the Bee Guard's pet cat, but Dino clings to the animal and gets fleas.
22a	9a	"Cupcake & Dino Top the Charts"	Pedro Eboli	Aron Dunn	May 3, 2019	TBA	TBA
Cupcake and Dino become famous for their iconic music, setting aside their friends.
22b	9b	"Switched at Birth"	Pedro Eboli	Doug Hadders & Adam Rotstein	May 3, 2019	TBA	TBA
Dino tries to become more mature by discovering that he is the older brother.
23a	10a	"Big City: The Documentary"	Pedro Eboli	Jeff Sager	May 3, 2019	TBA	TBA
The Boys try to win a film festival award for Vicky with a documentary about the Big City.
23b	10b	"Best Friend Matchmakers"	Pedro Eboli	Joel Buxton	May 3, 2019	TBA	TBA
Cupcake creates a friendship app.
24a	11a	"Wrestling Wrestling Wrestling!"	Pedro Eboli	Kendra Hibbert	May 3, 2019	TBA	TBA
Cupcake and Dino become wrestlers.
24b	11b	"Keepin' It Real"	Pedro Eboli	Stephanie Kaliner	May 3, 2019	TBA	TBA
Cupcake and Dino start selling properties in Big City.
25a	12a	"Old School Pool Rules"	Pedro Eboli	Kyle Dooley	May 3, 2019	TBA	TBA
The boys face an evil gang that is causing chaos in the pool area.
25b	12b	"The Night Shift"	Pedro Eboli	Nick Flanagan	May 3, 2019	TBA	TBA
Cupcake and Dino discover versions of themselves where they work at the Goody Bag on the night shift, but soon they want to steal the boys' lives.
26a	13a	"Fortune Teller Dino"	Pedro Eboli	Jeff Sager	May 3, 2019	TBA	TBA
Dino thinks he's a fortune-teller because of a toy that apparently predicts the future.
26b	13b	"Pal House"	Pedro Eboli	Mark Satterwaite	May 3, 2019	TBA	TBA
Cupcake, Dino, Grandma Steak, Uncle Chance, Hugo, and Vicky go to a reality show where they are trapped in a house for 1 month and set against each other.

== Broadcast ==
Cupcake & Dino: General Services was first released to Netflix as a Netflix original on July 27, 2018. The series premiered on Teletoon in Canada on September 8, 2018. In Brazil, the series began airing on November 15, 2018 on Disney XD. The series also premiered on Disney Channel in Southeast Asia on May 25, 2020.
