= The Kids in the Hall season 6 =

Season of television series

The Kids in the Hall
- Season 6
- Promotional poster
- Starring: Dave Foley; Kevin McDonald; Bruce McCulloch; Mark McKinney; Scott Thompson
- No. of episodes: 8

Release
- Original network: Amazon Prime Video
- Original release: May 13, 2022

The sixth season of Canadian sketch comedy series The Kids in the Hall aired in 2022; it was a revival, after 27 years, of the original series, which aired for five seasons from 1988 to 1995. Unlike the first five seasons, which aired on CBC in Canada and HBO, then CBS, in the United States, the sixth season aired on the Amazon Prime Video streaming service. It was greenlit and produced by Amazon Prime Video Canada, and was that subsidiary's first original series. The revival was announced in early 2020, but due to the COVID-19 pandemic, filming did not commence until mid-2021.

Unlike the previous seasons, season six was not filmed in front of a live audience, nor is it presented with a laugh track. Characters from previous seasons appear in the sixth season, along with a host of new ones. The new season also features a variety of guest stars, the majority of whom take part in a recurring segment called "Friends of Kids in the Hall". The season is again executive produced by Lorne Michaels. The Canadian band Shadowy Men on a Shadowy Planet took part in the filming of the new season's opening to play the show's theme song, a version of the instrumental "Having an Average Weekend", though the original recording was used instead.

== Production ==
=== Development ===
Following five seasons of The Kids in the Hall and the 1996 follow-up film, The Kids in the Hall: Brain Candy, the comedy troupe reunited for a series of live shows. In 2010, they created the dark comedy mini-series The Kids in the Hall: Death Comes to Town. Instead of comedy sketches, Death Comes to Town centered around one continuous storyline with the troupe performing an array of original characters. Several of The Kids in the Hall characters appear in cameo roles: the Chicken Lady, Paul Bellini (in his signature towel), and tweaked versions of Bruce McCulloch and Mark McKinney's police officer characters. Talks of a Kids in the Hall reboot followed. In 2018, Dave Foley reached out and had lunch with Britta von Schoeler at Broadway Video. Foley mentioned that 2018 marked the 30th anniversary of the original series. This led to discussions about having the show return. In March 2020, Amazon Prime Video Canada announced that it had ordered a new season of the original Kids in the Hall sketch show.

=== Filming ===
Production on the new season was halted due to the COVID-19 pandemic. Filming commenced in late May 2021 in Toronto, Canada under the code name "Sweater Vest".

== Cast ==
=== Main ===
- Dave Foley as various
- Bruce McCulloch as various
- Kevin McDonald as various
- Mark McKinney as various
- Scott Thompson as various

=== Guest ===
- Pete Davidson as Donavan
- Catherine O'Hara as Charlene
- Kenan Thompson as Ron
- Will Forte as Aaron
- Samantha Bee as Jillian
- Fred Armisen as Michael
- Tracee Ellis Ross as Lainie
- Eddie Izzard as Repairman
- Mark Hamill as Sasha
- Paul Bellini as himself and Voice of the Glory Hole
- Paul Sun-Hyung Lee as Mr. Lewis
- Jay Baruchel as Smoker
- Catherine Reitman as Diane
- Brandon Ash-Mohammed as Security Guard
- Colin Mochrie as Police Detective
- Kenneth Welsh as Martin

== Episodes ==
No. overall	No. in season	Title	Directed by	Written by	Original release date
102	1	Episode 1	Kelly Makin & Aleysa Young	Garry Campbell & Dave Foley & Bruce McCulloch & Kevin McDonald & Mark McKinney & Scott Thompson & Jennifer Goodhue & Matt Watts	May 13, 2022
Sketches: The Curse, Money Mart, The Last Fax, Friends of Kids in the Hall: Donovan, Foodie's Tarte, 60 on the Pole, Don and Marv Discuss KITH
103	2	Episode 2	Aleysa Young & Kelly Makin	Garry Campbell & Dave Foley & Bruce McCulloch & Kevin McDonald & Mark McKinney & Scott Thompson & Jennifer Goodhue	May 13, 2022
Sketches: Speed Racer, Drop Average Pt. 1, The Last Gloryhole, Drop Average Pt. 2, Imaginary Girlfriend, Friends of Kids in the Hall - Charlene, Masturbation Policy
104	3	Episode 3	Kelly Makin & Aleysa Young	Garry Campbell & Dave Foley & Bruce McCulloch & Kevin McDonald & Mark McKinney & Scott Thompson & Jennifer Goodhue & Matt Watts	May 13, 2022
Sketches: Doomsday DJ PT 1, Ambumblance, Doomsday DJ PT 2, Shakespeare's Bust, Friends of Kids in the Hall: Ron, Gut Spigot, Danny's New Shoes, Doomsday DJ PT 3
105	4	Episode 4	Aleysa Young & Kelly Makin	Garry Campbell & Dave Foley & Bruce McCulloch & Kevin McDonald & Mark McKinney & Scott Thompson & Jennifer Goodhue & Matt Watts	May 13, 2022
Sketches: Super Drunk PT 1, Hotel la Rut, Super Drunk PT 2, Friends of Kids in the Hall: Aaron, Antique, Super Drunk PT 3, The Patrol
106	5	Episode 5	Aleysa Young & Kelly Makin	Garry Campbell & Dave Foley & Bruce McCulloch & Kevin McDonald & Mark McKinney & Scott Thompson & Jennifer Goodhue & Matt Watts & Julie Klausner	May 13, 2022
Sketches: We're Having a Baby, Couple's Counseling PT 1, Cats, Couples Counseling PT 2, Surprise, Couples Counseling PT 3, Friends of Kids in the Hall: Jill, Assassin
107	6	Episode 6	Kelly Makin & Aleysa Young	Garry Campbell & Dave Foley & Bruce McCulloch & Kevin McDonald & Mark McKinney & Scott Thompson & Jennifer Goodhue & Matt Watts	May 13, 2022
Sketches: Don and Marv: Amazon, The Baby, Fran and Gordon PT 1, Friends of Kids in the Hall: Michael, Flags of Mark, Fran and Gordon PT 2, Cops - Parade, Bananas, Don and Marv Reach the End of the Hall, Fran and Gordon PT 3
108	7	Episode 7	Aleysa Young & Kelly Makin	Garry Campbell & Dave Foley & Bruce McCulloch & Kevin McDonald & Mark McKinney & Scott Thompson & Jennifer Goodhue & Matt Watts	May 13, 2022
Sketches: Taddli Guy - No Smoking, Lukewarm, Taddli Guy - Recycle Right, The Eradicator, Taddli Guy - No Dancing, Friends of Kids in the Hall: Lainie; The Professor
109	8	Episode 8	Kelly Makin & Aleysa Young	Garry Campbell & Dave Foley & Bruce McCulloch & Kevin McDonald & Mark McKinney & Scott Thompson & Jennifer Goodhue & Matt Watts	May 13, 2022
Sketches: I'm Not Crazy, I Just Lost My Glasses, Must Wash Hair, Friends of Kids in the Hall: Sasha, Much too Much, My Card, Cliffhanger, Don and Marv - Reburial

== Reception ==
The review aggregator website Rotten Tomatoes reported a 100% approval rating for the sixth season, based on 23 reviews, with an average rating of 8.30/10. The website's critical consensus reads, "The Kids in the Hall have become seasoned comedy veterans without missing a beat, delivering a fresh set of sketches that will delight longtime fans." Metacritic, which uses a weighted average, assigned a score of 83 out of 100 based on 6 critics, indicating "generally favorable reviews". Total Film praised the new season, writing that "skeptical fans of the flagship show will be delighted to see that not only have the Kids maintained their strange sense of humor, but have become absolute masters of their craft – reminding everyone who the true kings of comedy really are."

Awards and nominations for The Kids in the Hall, season 6
Year	Award	Category	Recipient(s)/Nominee(s)	Result
2022	Hollywood Critics Association	Best Streaming Variety Sketch Series, Talk Series or Special	The Kids in the Hall	Won
