= Winston Steinburger and Sir Dudley Ding Dong =

- Genre: Science fiction Comedy
- Created by: Mike Geiger
- Written by: Mark Satterthwaite; Thomas Duncan-Watt; Charlotte Rose Hamlyn; Mark Little
- Directed by: Paul H. Brown; Glenn Kirkpatrick
- Voices of: Deven Mack; Ryan Belleville; Matt Baram; Mark Edwards; Seán Cullen; Evany Rosen; Robert Tinkler
- Theme music composer: Patrick Cooke
- Countries of origin: Canada; Australia
- Original language: English
- No. of seasons: 1
- No. of episodes: 26

Production
- Executive producers: Donna Andrews; Laura Clunie; Olivier Dumont; Margaret O'Brien; Chris Rose
- Producers: Stu Connolly; Tristan Homer; Trevor Bentley; Mauro Casalese
- Running time: 22 minutes
- Production companies: Entertainment One: Sticky Pictures; Atomic Cartoons

Original release
- Network: ABC Me
- Release: 19 September – 5 December 2016
- Network: Teletoon
- Release: 2 January – 27 January 2017

Winston Steinburger and Sir Dudley Ding Dong is an animated children's television series created by Mike Geiger. The series follows Winston Steinburger, a 12-year-old boy and his pet cat named Dudley as they go on intergalactic adventures with their alien friends, foes and oddball encounters across the worlds.

It was first announced in 2014 as a joint co-production of Teletoon and ABC Me, then sold to other broadcasters.

== Characters ==
=== Main ===
- Winston Steinburger (voiced by Deven Mack), an adventurous 12-year-old boy.
- Sir Dudley Ding Dong (voiced by Ryan Belleville), an anthropomorphic talking yellow cat who is Winston's best friend.
- Hampton (voiced by Matt Baram), a more dour and sarcastic mouse-like alien who attempts to control the amount of trouble Winston and Dudley get into.

=== Recurring ===
- Cutty (voiced by Mark Edwards), an adoptive grandfather-figure to Winston. He owns the busy diner that Winston works at.
- Pam the Destroyer (voiced by Evany Rosen), a bored girl who seeks entertainment by messing with people in her planet-sized ship.
- Soda (voiced by Seán Cullen), Pam's robot helper who does all her work.
- Sgt. Sasha Spritz (voiced by Seán Cullen), the leader of the Spacecop Superforce, galactic police force and reality show stars.
- Dark Lord (voiced by Rob Tinkler), an evil alien saving wrath destruction trying spaceship later courage before galaxy while calling the universe.

=== Benevolent Alliance ===
- Zuzuu (voiced by Kayla Lorette)
- Brad Buchholz (voiced by Cory Doran)
- Manny (voiced by Mark Little)
- Talking Meatloaf/"Doctor Sick" (voiced by Joshua Graham)
- Holo Girl (voiced by Gwynne Phillips)
- Skunk (voiced by Cliff Saunders)
- Murray (voiced by Paul Soles)
- Restaurant Patron (voiced by Susanna Lee)
- Chief Alien (voiced by Kyle Dooley)
- Hyper Tops (voiced by Graeme Cornies)
- Sissy Wissy (voiced by Brianna D'Aguanno)
- Menace Gnasher (voiced by Tony Nappo)
- Face-Eating Monster (voiced by David Berni)
- Campton (voiced by Mark Edwards)
- Swamp Teen (voiced by Mark Little)

== Episodes ==
No.	Title	Original release date
1	"Party Pants Bromance / Very Fast Forward"	2 January 2017
2	"Love and Rockets / Hitchhiker's Guide to Gastronomy"	3 January 2017
3	"Eat My Dust, Space Witch / Evil Interns"	8 January 2017
4	"Camp Coppawannastopya / The Greasiest Grease Trap in the Galaxy"	9 January 2017
5	"Smashing It / Rip Van Wrinkles"	10 January 2017
6	"Safety First / Prank Day"	11 January 2017
7	"The Most Important Meal of the Day / A Beef History of Time"	4 January 2017
8	"Hampton's Family Reunion / Father of Invention"	12 January 2017
9	"Spritzed / Bikers in Space"	13 January 2017
10	"Day of the Dud / Map Day"	7 January 2017
11	"Goat Dude 4 / Finding Num-Num"	14 January 2017
12	"Opposites Attack / The Alliance of Guardians"	15 January 2017
13	"Space Bigfoot / Win Win Win Situation"	5 January 2017
14	"Comedy Night / No More Normies"	16 January 2017
15	"The Winston Steinburger Experience / You Win-ston, You Lose-ston"	17 January 2017
16	"Sir's Club / Space Junked"	6 January 2017
17	"Hamburger Horror Story / Swamp Ten"	18 January 2017
18	"Cupcake Re-Refreshener / Let's Be Spacecops"	19 January 2017
19	"Invention Bandit / The Boy Who Cried Burger"	20 January 2017
20	"Sgt. Winston Powersuit Jr. / Speed Eaters"	21 January 2017
21	"Subconscious Slumber Party / Planet Learnius"	22 January 2017
22	"Lord of the Fleas / The Crew-Zuu Blues"	23 January 2017
23	"Ding Dong Spacecop / Happy Birthday, Dear Dark Lord"	24 January 2017
24	"Spacecop Soda Force / A Shoe-In for Trouble"	25 January 2017
25	"Mystery of the Cuttyroid / Adventures in Holo-Sitting"	26 January 2017
26	"Gross Violations / Dear Diary"	27 January 2017

== Broadcast ==
The series has also aired on Disney XD in Latin America, Pop Max in the United Kingdom and Ireland, and Nickelodeon in the Scandinavia region. Reruns in Canada air on Cartoon Network. It also aired on Pop in Africa.
