= Aleysa Young =

Canadian television director

Aleysa Young is a Canadian television director. She is most noted for her work as a director of Baroness von Sketch Show, for which she won a Canadian Screen Award for Best Direction in a Variety or Sketch Comedy Program or Series at the 8th Canadian Screen Awards in 2020 for the episode "Humanity Is in an Awkward Stage".

She was previously a nominee in the same category at the 5th Canadian Screen Awards in 2017 for Baroness von Sketch Show ("Last Year You Weren't Forty") and at the 6th Canadian Screen Awards in 2018 for This Hour Has 22 Minutes, and is a three-time nominee for Best Direction in a Comedy Series at the 6th Canadian Screen Awards for Kim's Convenience ("Date Night"), at the 9th Canadian Screen Awards for New Eden ("Go with Gaion"), and at the 10th Canadian Screen Awards for Workin' Moms ("FACK").

She has also directed episodes of Cavendish, Strays, Run the Burbs, and Ginny and Georgia.

She and Kelly Makin directed the 2022 revival of The Kids In The Hall.
