= Steve, The Second =

Steve The Second was a four-part comedy series that was broadcast Saturday mornings on CBC Radio One, running from 11:30 - 12:00pm (half an hour later in Newfoundland). The successor series to Steve, The First, this bleak comedy was set 25 years after the original story. Set in a post-apocalyptic future, it details the story of the son of the original Steve as he is sent for by his mother to save the city of Orontonto (a thinly disguised Toronto) as it is besieged by the Dark Alliance.

Steve The Second was written by Matt Watts, who also starred in the episodes.

It was succeeded in its time slot by High Definition.

== Crew ==
Tom Anniko directed all four episodes. Joe Mahoney recorded and mixed every episode and also served as the series story editor.

Anton Szabo performed all the sound effects.

Tom Anniko was also the Executive Producer.
