= Tristan Homer =

Canadian television producer and podcaster (born 1980)

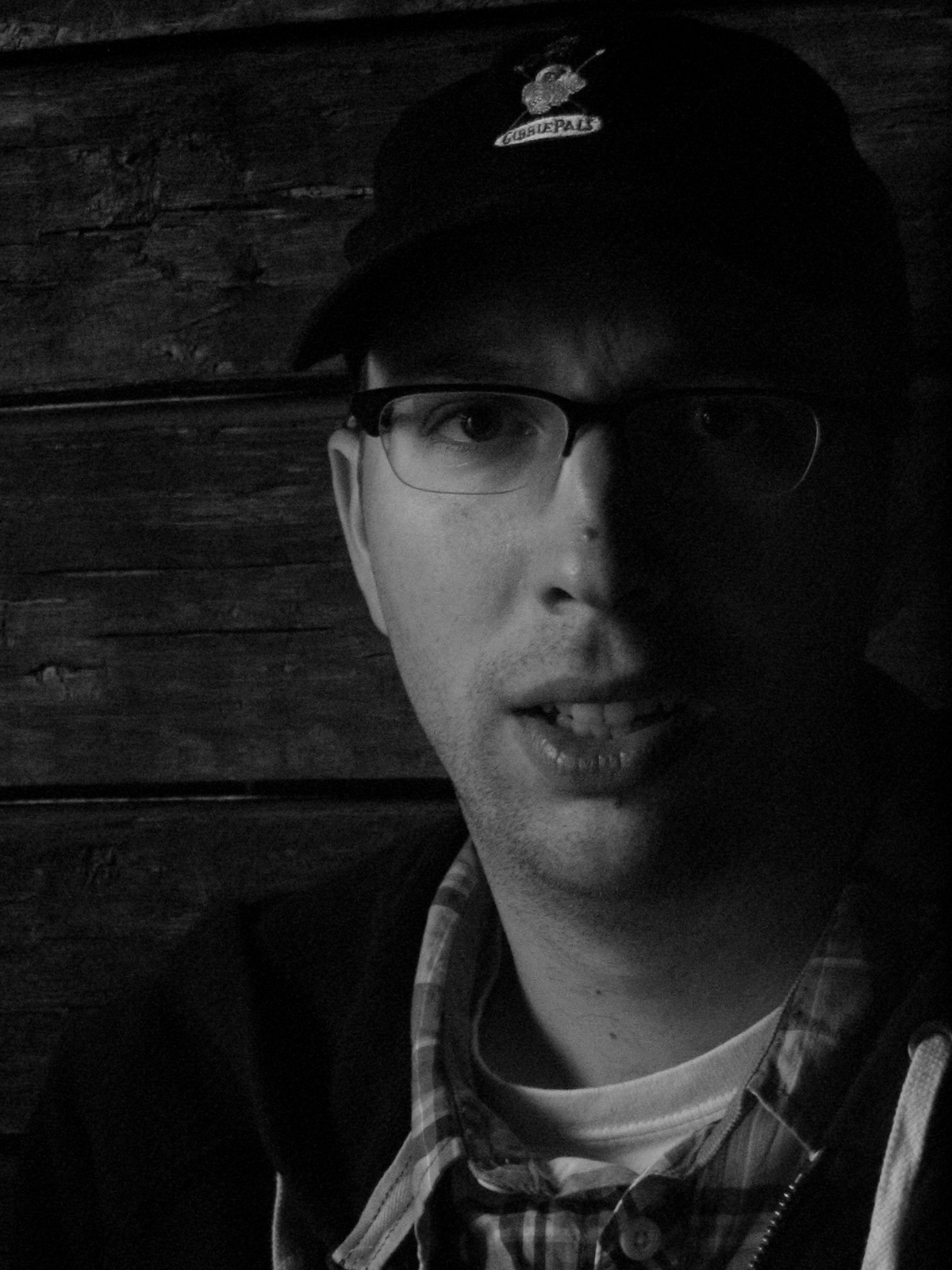
- Homer on May 19, 2007
- Born: 1980 (age 44–45); Salmon Cove, Newfoundland

Tristan Homer (born 1980) is a Canadian television producer and podcaster.

He was most recently the co-executive producer on the Netflix animated series My Little Pony: Make Your Mark.

He has also served as creative producer on the animated children's television programs Alien TV and Transformers: BotBots, as producer on Cupcake & Dino: General Services, Almost Naked Animals, Numb Chucks, and Winston Steinburger and Sir Dudley Ding Dong, and as line producer on the series Max & Ruby, as well as the Gemini-nominated television adaptation of Wibbly Pig.

As a podcaster, Homer co-created the video series Jim Dupree: Enthusiast in 2005. The podcast was later adapted for television, and aired on BiteTV in Canada.

Homer was nominated for a 2013 Canadian Screen Award as a producer on Almost Naked Animals. In 2014, he won in the Best Animated Program or Series category as a producer on the same show. In 2020, he was nominated in the Best Animated Program or Series category as a producer on Cupcake & Dino: General Services.
