= Cavendish (TV series) =

Canadian television sitcom

Cavendish is a Canadian television sitcom, premiering on CBC Television in January 2019. Created by Mark Little and Andrew Bush, formerly of the sketch comedy troupe Picnicface, the series stars Little and Bush as Mark and Andy, brothers returning to their childhood home in Cavendish, Prince Edward Island for the first time since their parents' divorce, only to find that life in the town is much stranger and more surreal than they remember.

The cast also includes Kevin Eldon and Kathy Greenwood. The sitcom was filmed in Charlottetown, Prince Edward Island

== Episodes ==
No.	Title	Directed by	Written by	Original release date	Canada viewers (millions)
1	"The Beast"	Aleysa Young	Andrew Bush	January 8, 2019	N/A
Mark and Andy return to their childhood shrines to Fred Penner and Under the Umbrella Tree, and are introduced to the legend of a monster who the town pays tribute to. Then a little boy is accidentally stabbed, mistook for a giant wolf.
2	"The Annes"	Jeremy Lalonde	Mark Litte & Andrew Bush	January 15, 2019	N/A
A group of women obsessed with Anne Shirley invite the brothers to spend the night, leading to accusations of espionage levied at Creepy Ted.
3	"House of Wax"	Mars Horodyski	Mark Little & Andrew Bush	January 22, 2019	N/A
After the rejection of a manga poster, a wax figure of Fred Penner makes its home in the museum, while the cost of stabbing a young boy is paid in smoothies.
4	"Carny Law"	Jeremy Lalonde	Aaron Eves & Stephanie Kaliner	January 29, 2019	N/A
After being denied spending money from his brother, Mark begins to work at the carnival that has come to town and comes to enjoy the life it seemingly promises.
5	"Charlottetown Nights"	Mars Horodyski	Monica Heisey	February 5, 2019	N/A
Mark, Molly and reluctant Andy travel to the big city of Charlottetown to see the hypnotist, Laverne. While in the dangerous city they find themselves on the bad side of a local gang.
6	"The Coven"	Aleysa Young	Scott Montgomery	February 12, 2019	N/A
After seeing the lackluster Coven that Ruth is a part of, Mark decides to start a rival Coven.
7	"The Story of Ruth"	Andrew Bush	Mark Little & Andrew Bush	February 19, 2019	N/A
The green eyed monster starts to show in Ruth after Andy hires a caretaker to look after his father, much to the chagrin of Mark.
8	"It's an Andyful Life"	Andrew Bush	Stephanie Kaliner	February 26, 2019	N/A
After his family has forgotten his birthday, Andy finds himself in a world where his brother never existed. A world he begins to realize might be better than his own.
