= Carolyn Bennett (comedian) =

Canadian comedian and writer

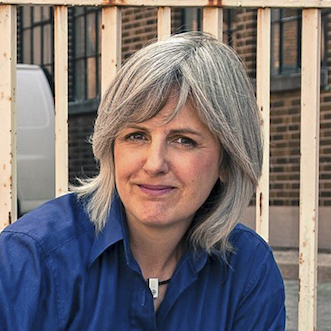
- 2016
- Born: Montreal, Quebec, Canada

Comedy career
- Years active: 1980s–present
- Medium: Stand up, television

Carolyn Bennett is a Canadian comedian and writer.

== Career ==
Born and raised in Montreal, Bennett was part of the anglophone comedy scene in the 1980s at The Comedy Nest on Bishop Street, operated by Ernie Butler. Bennett's associates and close friends included comedian Sean Keane and the comedy sketch group The Vestibules.

Bennett moved to Toronto in 1986 and performed at Yuk Yuk's while writing for the television show YTV Rocks. In 1989, Bennett moved to Edmonton, Alberta and toured with Yuk Yuk's while working at CFRN/CTV Edmonton as a writer and producer on Video Stew, a music video and comedy show. She was also an associate producer on an in-house science magazine show at the public television station ACCESS Network.

After three years in Edmonton, Bennett returned to Toronto to continue doing standup while taking on progressively challenging work as a television writer and performer. She auditioned to be the host of TVOntario's Imprint and was instead given the job of writing and hosting Blood, Sweat and Tape, a reworking of Ontario's Telefest Awards for young filmmakers and television producers. She worked for the CBC in the 1990s and 2000s writing and contributed to Canadian Awards show including the Geminis, the Genies and the NHL Awards. She did a stint as a staff writer for This Hour Has 22 Minutes and was a writer for the animated series Ruby Gloom, for which she received a Writers Guild of Canada nomination. Bennett was a columnist for Eye Weekly in the mid-1990s and had her own standup comedy special on the CBC's Comics!

Most recently, Bennett has been active as a playwright, her work having been produced across Canada and in the United States. In 2013, Bennett received the TIFF Screenwriting Intensive Jury Prize for her screenplay The Mac and Watson Springtime Reeferendum Show. She was a member of the 2017 Thousand Islands Playhouse Playwright's Unit and developed the full-length play The Monarchists.

Her debut novel Please Stand By was published by Vancouver's NON Publishing in Fall 2019. She was awarded a 2021 Toronto Arts Council grant for Going In A Different Direction, a collection of short stories in-progress. Be My Zero-Sum was published in 2022 by The Quarantine Review, and Moral Support Desk appeared in Issue 112 of Canadian Notes and Queries.

She was a founder of the monthly standup comedy night Hirut Hoot at Toronto's Hirut Cafe and Restaurant. Her humour has been described as "warped and wonderful".

She was previously a speechwriter for Ontario Premier Dalton McGuinty and Ontario Lieutenant Governors David Onley and Elizabeth Dowdeswell.

== Awards and nominations ==
- Writers Guild of Canada: 2007 finalist for the Canadian Screenwriting Awards - Children & Preschool for "Happy Yam Ween", an episode of Ruby Gloom
- Canadian Comedy Awards: 2012 nominee for Best Performance by a Female - Film
- TIFF Studio: June 2013 winner of the Screenwriting Intensive Jury Prize for The Mac and Watson Springtime Reeferendum Show

== Personal life ==
Bennett has often been mistaken for Dr. Carolyn Bennett, a Canadian ambassador. The two have met on several occasions.

Bennett is also a speaker on substance abuse and recovery.
