= Hotbox (TV series) =

Canadian comedy television show

- Genre: Sketch comedy
- Created by: Pat Thornton
- Directed by: Vivieno Caldinelli
- Starring: Pat Thornton
- Country of origin: Canada
- Original language: English
- No. of seasons: 1
- No. of episodes: 13

Production
- Running time: 30 minutes

Original release
- Network: The Comedy Network
- Release: June 2, 2009 – 2010

Related
- The Owl and the Man

Hotbox was a Canadian absurdist sketch comedy television show on The Comedy Network. It starred Pat Thornton, Sandy Jobin-Bevans, Levi MacDougall, Jeff McEnery, Vivieno Caldinelli and Tal Zimerman, and was a spinoff of the online sitcom The Owl and the Man. Some notable guest appearances on the show included comics Jon Dore, Colin Mochrie and Seán Cullen. The title "Hot Box" relates to the show's frame story, which starts in each episode's opening sequence, which depicts a box which falls from space, and is discovered by scientists. Throughout the episode, the scientists then perform disastrous experiments involving the box, which contains screens displaying the show's sketches. These sketches include cartoons, commercial parodies, puppets, and fake movie trailers.

== Sketches ==
- Brian Dennehy convention, numerous commercials for a fictional "official unofficial Brian Dennehy convention" taking place at the Hamilton Convention Centre. Other "events", for example, "The 22nd Annual Festival of Whips Convention for 1987", have been advertised at the Hamilton Convention Center as well.
- Brad Piss, a salesman (Thornton) who pitches new products in low-quality, self-produced, television commercials. For example, in episode 12, Brad Piss advertises Fripps: "The delicious taste of potato chips... and then you put them in a fryer".
- Cthulhu and Jim, a sitcom about an ordinary man, Jim, who works at a video rental store with Cthulhu.
- Dinner in Space, in which "Willie Montenegro" (Thornton) interviews guests (see above) about various real or made-up projects they have worked on.
- Dinosaur Man, a children's television program in which a man (not dressed as a dinosaur) (Thornton) entertains a live audience of children by simply putting the word "Dinosaur" into normal conversation.
- French Toast Hawk, a series of animated commercials from the fictional French Toast Board of Ontario, in which a hawk attacks people and steals their French toast.
- Howdy Do That!, a live how-to show in which something always goes wrong.
- Lobsterman, a superhero (Thornton) with a poorly disguised secret identity.
- Press Conference Bear, in which a bear who is an author takes questions from a hostile, sensationalistic journalist.
- The Owl and the Man, a sitcom about an insomniac and his friend, who is an owl.
- Rage Rabbit, about an irritable, Hulk-like cartoon rabbit superhero.
- RoboCop, which depicts the filming of various commercials which star RoboCop, who reacts violently to comments from the other actors.
- Sand Advice, in which personified sand (Thornton) provides an anecdote.
- Video Game Footage, many episodes feature a series of sketches depicting a fictitious video game in the style of 1980s arcade games. The game is 'played out' over three different levels and has many of the characteristics of old arcade-style games: poor quality, heavily pixellated, low color depth graphics, monotonous and repetitive sounds, etc. Examples of games featured include the following: "Paint Me Cat", "Rappin' Dad" and "Virtual Donair Maker", which contains some Greek (both spoken and written).
