= Pat Thornton =

Canadian actor, comedian and writer (born 1976)

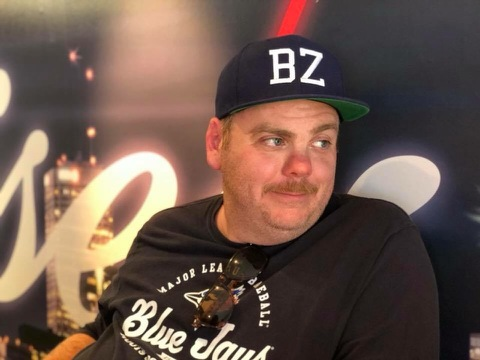
- A photo of Thornton
- Born: September 5, 1976 (age 49); Kingston, Ontario, Canada
- Occupations: Actor, comedian, writer
- Years active: 2001–present
- Known for: The Sketchersons, Hotbox, Sunnyside, Satisfaction

Pat Thornton (born September 5, 1976) is a Canadian television actor, comedian, and writer.

== Early life ==
Thornton was born in Kingston and raised in Mississauga, Ontario.

== Career ==
Thornton was a founding member of the sketch comedy troupe The Sketchersons, he also later appeared in the sketch comedy series Hotbox and Sunnyside.

His acting roles have included a recurring role in the sitcom Satisfaction, the web series Space Janitors and Everyone's Famous, and guest appearances in Warehouse 13, Working the Engels, Spun Out and Royal Canadian Air Farce. He garnered two Canadian Screen Award nominations at the 2nd Canadian Screen Awards in 2014, in the categories of Supporting Actor in a Comedy Series for Satisfaction, and Performance in a Program or Series Produced for Digital Media for Everyone's Famous. At the 4th Canadian Screen Awards in 2016, Thornton and the other core cast of Sunnyside collectively won the award for Best Performance in a Variety or Sketch Comedy Program or Series.

In 2017, he starred in the comedy film Filth City, loosely based on the drug scandal surrounding former Toronto mayor Rob Ford. On January 29, 2019, Thornton was nominated for a Juno Award in the Comedy Album of the Year category for his stand-up comedy album Chicken!

== Filmography ==
=== Film ===
Year	Title	Role	Notes
2001	When Urine Love	Writer	Short film
2005	Black Belts: Tommy Nitro	The Crimson Sausage	
2005	Low Budget	Jaye Wolfgang	
2006	Things to Do	Edward	
2011	Roller Town	Beef	
2013	Stag	Carl	
2014	Dirty Singles	Matt	
2017	Filth City	Mayor Tom Hogg	
2019	The Kindness of Strangers	Older Man	
2020	Feel the Beat	Tommy	
2021	Resident Evil: Welcome to Raccoon City	Truck Driver	

=== Television ===
Year	Title	Role	Notes
2006	The Road to Christmas	Tiny Snopes	Television film
2007, 2009	The Jon Dore Television Show	Cable Guy	2 episodes
2008	Testees	Bobby	Episode: "Gas Pills"
2009	Hotbox	Various	13 episodes
2010	SketchersonsTV	Various	6 episodes
2011	Life Unjarred	Fan	Episode #1.14
2011	Dino Dan	Cory's Dad	Episode: "Mini Dino/The Three Little Paleontologists"
2011	Almost Heroes	Chet	Episode: "Terry and Peter vs. Season Finale"
2011	Call Me Fitz	Skittish Customer	Episode: "A** Hickey"
2011	Goodbye Sara Hennessey	Pat	Episode: "Sara Gets Magical"
2012	Warehouse 13	Roy	Episode: "Personal Effects"
2012	Comedy Bar	Pat	5 episodes
2012–2024	Space Janitors	Mike Chet	20 episodes
2013	Everyone's Famous	Richard	Episode: "One hour special"
2013	Dino Dan: Trek's Adventures	Hannah's Dad	Episode: "Flight of the Pterodaustro/Trekules"
2013	Satisfaction	Simon Clarke	12 episodes
2013–2015	Royal Canadian Air Farce	Mike Duffy / Various	3 episodes
2014	Working the Engels	Paul	Episode: "Jenna's Friend"
2014	Annedroids	Mr. Schudar	Episode: "The Power of Love"
2014	The Stanley Dynamic	Exterminator	Episode: "The Stanley Infestation"
2015	Spun Out	Doug	Episode: "Cop Blocker"
2015	True Dating Stories	Snow	Episode: "Tara"
2015	Sunnyside	Various roles	13 episodes
2016	Bruno & Boots: Go Jump in the Pool	Coach Flynn	Television film
2016–2017	My Kitchen Can Be Anything	Pat	19 episodes
2017	Odd Squad	Mayor Glumley	Episode: "License to Science/Negative Town"
2017	Filth City	Mayor Tom Hogg	9 episodes
2017, 2018	The Beaverton	Various roles	2 episodes
2018	The Amazing Gayl Pile	Mr. Wright	Episode: "Hard Wright"
2018	Second Jen	Officer Corn	Episode: "The Break In"
2018	Baroness von Sketch Show	Paul's Friend #2 / Michael	2 episodes
2019	Carter	George Hart	Episode: "Harley Wanted To Say Bonspiel"
2021	Workin' Moms	Gerry	Episode: "Pleasure Yourself"
2021	Murdoch Mysteries	Driver	Episode: "The Night Before Christmas"
2022	Acting Good	Brady	10 episodes
2023	I Woke Up a Vampire	Coach C	4 episodes
2023	Fellow Travelers	Uncle Jim	Episode: "Your Nuts Roasting on an Open Fire"
