= Roller Town =

- Directed by: Andrew Bush
- Written by: Andrew Bush; Scott Vrooman; Mark Little
- Produced by: Jay Dahl; Bill Niven; Scott Vrooman
- Starring: Mark Little; Kayla Lorette
- Cinematography: Christopher Porter
- Edited by: Shawn Beckwith; Thorben Bieger
- Music by: Isabelle Noel; Richard Pell
- Production companies: D Films; Northeast Films
- Distributed by: D Films
- Release date: September 15, 2011 (AFF)
- Running time: 76 minutes
- Country: Canada
- Language: English

Roller Town is a Canadian comedy film, directed by Andrew Bush and released in 2011. Featuring the sketch comedy troupe Picnicface, the film is set in the 1970s, and stars Mark Little as Leo, a roller skater who tries to save his favourite roller rink from being converted into a video arcade, while also trying to win the love of Julia (Kayla Lorette), the mayor's daughter.

The other members of the troupe — Bush, Scott Vrooman, Kyle Dooley, Cheryl Hann, Evany Rosen, Brian MacQuarrie and Bill Wood — also appear in the film in supporting roles, as well as Adam Robert Bayne, Jordan Talbot, George Basil, Brian Heighton, Pat Thornton, John Beale, Rhys Bevan-John, Howard D'Arcy and Nicki Davis.

The film premiered as the opening film of the 2011 Atlantic Film Festival, before going into commercial release in 2012.

== Critical response ==
Robert Bell of Exclaim! panned the film, writing that "While virtually every joke falls flat, such as a protracted sequence where Leo (Little) receives numerous phone calls telling him he wasn't accepted into a roller-skating program at a prestigious school, some things that could have been funny ― a sex scene while roller skating or a gag about having sex with corn ― are ruined by sheer tone and composition. Even the musical numbers, where they sing about it being "fuck o'clock" or "half-past pussy," fall flat since they're presented more so as cheap high school improv than actual film inserts. Really, the only good thing about the feature film debut of Picnicface is that it's really, really short."

Chris Knight of the National Post was more positive, writing that "the comedy is fast-paced — it has to be; the movie’s over in 76 minutes —— and delivers a barrage of non sequiturs, cornball puns, sight gags and period flourishes. The last category includes oddly time freeze frames, and Batman-style on-screen sound effects (though not during fights)."

The reviewer for That Shelf asserted that "cribbing generously from 70s 'classics'like Roller Boogie and Skatetown, U.S.A. and featuring an ending straight out of The Apple, director and co-writer Andrew Bush keeps the energy level appropriately high and only resorting to sketch styled transitions (like some pretty hilarious fake album tracks from a wonderfully attired band) to bail him out of a tight spot. It never feels like the kind of 'free jazz' style of filmmaking that would be so easy for a sketch troupe to attempt. These guys know how to stage gags and while the pacing sometimes feel a little all over the place even at a scant 78 minutes, they trim the fat enough around the edges that it feels like an accomplished, no bullshit bit of cinematic silliness."

== Awards ==
The film won three Canadian Comedy Awards at the 13th Canadian Comedy Awards in 2012, for Best Film, Best Direction in a Film (Bush) and Best Writing in a Film (Vrooman, Little, Bush).
