= Steve, The First =

Comedic dystopian radio play

Steve, The First was a four-part dark comedy set in a post-apocalyptic future, broadcast on CBC Radio One in 2005. It ran on Saturday mornings from 11:30 - 12:00pm (half an hour later in Newfoundland).

Steve, a young slacker, emerges from an underground vault after a year spent reading a lengthy novel, and discovers he has missed a nuclear war (thereby surviving it unharmed) in the interim. Exploring the "post-popocalyptic" world, where animals have mutated into menacing giant creatures, fire now rains from the skies instead of water, dogs explode from human contact, and people melt when exposed to sunlight, Steve discovers latent telepathic abilities, and uses them to communicate with the one dog he meets who can tolerate human company.

Steve takes shelter at the home of Colleen, who hides her deceased parents from the "dead collectors", roving children who claim melted corpses. They begin a relationship, which leads to Colleen's cure from melting when they become intimate. This frustrates Phil Green, an evil politician who sees his chances of becoming mayor of Toronto greatly enhanced by the death of his opponents, and has assigned two assistants to stalk Colleen, whom he strongly desires.

A bizarre power struggle develops as Steve bumbles his way into folk heroism, helping to reclaim civilization for the common people as Phil tries to harness surviving resources to take ultimate control.

All of this is ostensibly told from the point of view of a storyteller who is recounting the tale 1,000 years later.

A sequel, Steve, The Second, was aired early in 2006.

Steve The First was written by Matt Watts, who also starred in the episodes.

== Crew ==
Tom Anniko directed all four episodes. Joe Mahoney recorded and mixed every episode and also served as the series story editor.

Anton Szabo performed all the sound effects.

Tom Anniko was also the Executive Producer.
