= Almost Naked Animals =

Canadian animated television series

- Genre: Comedy
- Created by: Noah Z. Jones
- Developed by: Doug Hadders; Adam Rotstein
- Directed by: Brad Ferguson
- Voices of: Robert Tinkler; Howard Jerome; Emilie-Claire Barlow; David Berni; Seán Cullen; Linda Kash
- Theme music composer: Steve D'Angelo; Terry Tompkins
- Opening theme: "Almost Naked Animals!"
- Ending theme: "Almost Naked Animals!" (instrumental)
- Composers: James Chapple; Greame Cornies; David Kelly; Brian Pickett
- Country of origin: Canada
- Original language: English
- No. of seasons: 3
- No. of episodes: 52 (104 segments)

Production
- Executive producers: Noah Z. Jones; Vince Commisso; Steve Jarosz
- Producers: Tristan Homer; Mark Satterthwaite (creative producer)
- Running time: 22 minutes (2 11-minute segments)
- Production company: 9 Story Entertainment

Original release
- Network: YTV
- Release: January 7, 2011 – May 22, 2013

Almost Naked Animals is a Canadian animated television series created by Noah Z. Jones for YTV. The series is based upon an art website that Jones created in 2005. The series premiered on January 7, 2011 on YTV and ended on May 22, 2013. It also aired on Cartoon Network in the United States, CITV in the United Kingdom (premiering on April 11, 2011), and ABC Entertains (formerly ABC3 and ABC ME) in Australia (premiering on May 27, 2011).

== Premise ==
Almost Naked Animals is set inside a tropical resort called the Banana Cabana. All of the cabana's staff members and residents are funny animals who have shaved off their fur and wear only underclothes. An anthropomorphic dog named Howie is the manager and leader of the cabana. Each episode follows Howie and his "misfit" crew having unusual adventures in the Banana Cabana.

== Characters ==
=== Main ===
- Howie (voiced by Robert Tinkler) is a pale-yellow dog and manager of the Banana Cabana. He is hyperactive, very dimwitted, impulsive, almost always cheerful, and likes annoying everyone else. He is also completely oblivious to his sister's evil nature.
- Octo (voiced by Howard Jerome) is an overly cautious blue octopus and the desk clerk, as well as Howie's best friend.
- Bunny (voiced by Emilie-Claire Barlow) is a sometimes short-tempered yellow rabbit and activity planner with a sugary personality (subject to mood swings).
- Duck (voiced by David Berni) is a tan-colored duck who does every random job and tries anything to get it done. It was revealed in the episodes "The Sun Howie Always Wanted" and "Mini Howies" that his full name is Archibald William Nightingale Duck III. As a running gag, Duck often appears during a problem with a non sequitur.
- Piggy "Willberforce" Pig (voiced by Seán Cullen) is a pale pink-colored pig who is a ninja-trained master chef with a Bulgarian accent. He speaks broken English.
- Narwhal (voiced by Seán Cullen) is a self-centered, periwinkle-colored narwhal and lounge performer who loves to sing.
- Sloth (voiced by Linda Kash) is a peach-colored sloth and the bellhop of the Banana Cabana. She has a crush on Howie. She also does everything slowly. She moves around using her luggage cart.

=== Villains ===
- Poodle (voiced by Alyson Court) is a pink-colored poodle and Howie's evil older sister who owns a rival hotel called the Chateau Chattoo. She always tries to ruin Howie's fun and tries to take over his hotel.
- Batty (voiced by Julie Lemieux) is Poodle's purple-colored bat minion. In the episode "Oh Brother, Who Art Thou?", Batty reveals to Howie that he is his long-lost cousin.

=== Recurring ===
- Dirk Danger (voiced by Christian Potenza) is a chipmunk who has a career (more or less) as a stuntman. He is Howie's role model.
- Radiation Rooster (voiced by Adrian Truss) is the Radioactive Microwave Sales Rooster. His limbs fall off and he is portrayed as unintelligent.
- Captain Fizzy is a Pirate Turtle and the owner of the soft drink "Captain Fizzy's Fuzzy Orange Soda" and "Sugar" which is 99% sugar. He is a turtle. He started a few contests like the limited edition blue and green can contest and the Fuzzy Orange Happy Land contest. He has a floating factory which is a large boat.
- Hippo (voiced by Jamie Watson) is a pale blue-colored hippopotamus who often wears superhero attire.
- Mayor Trout (voiced by Seán Cullen) is a trout and the mayor.

== Episodes ==
=== Series overview ===
Season	Episodes	Originally released	
Season	Episodes	First released	Last released
1	26	January 7, 2011	December 14, 2011
2	14	February 4, 2012	July 7, 2012
3	12	April 15, 2013	May 22, 2013

=== Season 1 (2011) ===
No. overall	No. in season	Title	Written by	Original release date	Prod. code
1	1	"It's My Party / One Star Hotel"	Story by : Doug Hadders & Adam Rotstein; Andrew Nicholls, Darrell Vickers & John Derevlany; Teleplay by : Doug Hadders, Adam Rotstein & Rob Tinkler	January 7, 2011	101
"It's My Party" – A party hosting goes awry when the gang gets locked in the basement. "One Star Hotel" – Howie and Poodle try to get both of their hotels a five-star rating.
2	2	"There Are No Small Parts / Keep On Monster Truckin'"	Doug Hadders & Adam Rotstein; Doug Hadders, Adam Rotstein, and Brian Hogan	January 14, 2011	102
"There Are No Small Parts" - A nervous Octo is told to star with stunt sensation Dirk Danger in a movie. "Keep On Monster Truckin"' - Howie finds a toy truck that grows with water, which causes trouble.
3	3	"The Ear Wax Elf / Stunter's Block"	Tony Elliott; Steve Westren; Fred Stroppel	January 21, 2011	103
"The Ear Wax Elf" – Howie tries to convince his friends that there is an elf who gathers earwax and delivers presents. "Stunter's Block" – Howie tries to convince Dirk Danger to start performing his stunt career again after he quits.
4	4	"What Would Batty Do? / The Duck Vinci Code"	Jenn Engels; Steve Daye	January 28, 2011	104
"What Would Batty Do?" - Batty and Howie switch hotels after the former is injured. "The Duck Vinci Code" - Duck gains the ability to see the future after being electrocuted by lightning twice.
5	5	"Employee of the Month for Life / Saliva Drive"	Steve Westren; James Burks	February 5, 2011	105
"Employee of the Month for Life" - Howie must decide who the employee of the month should be. "Saliva Drive" - Howie and the staff collect saliva for Octo so he can enter a cherry pit spitting competition.
6	6	"Veggie Beast / Hurricane Seasoning"	Brian Hartigan & Hollis Ludlow-Carroll; Tony Elliott	February 12, 2011	106
"Veggie Beast" – Howie grows a plant, which slowly starts eating the rest of the staff. "Hurricane Seasoning" – Howie and his pals are trapped outside during a condiment storm.
7	7	"Act to the Future / Guess Who's Coming to Lunch?"	Sean Benham; Mike Kiss	February 19, 2011	107
"Act to the Future" – Howie and Octo attempt, but fail, to travel into the future to avoid performing in Bunny's play. "Guess Who's Coming to Lunch?" – Piggy's ninja chef master returns to help Piggy improve his abilities.
8	8	"All Dog, No Danger / Cowboy Cabana"	Story by : Richard Clark & Hollis Ludlow-Carroll; Teleplay by : Hollis Ludlow-Carroll; Laurie Elliott	February 26, 2011	108
"All Dog, No Danger" – Howie needs to find a new hero after he is forced to leave the Dirk Danger fan club. "Cowboy Cabana" – Howie gives the hotel a Wild West theme for a visitor.
9	9	"Oh Brother, Who Art Thou? / Nothing But the Tooth"	Story by : Terry Saltsman; Brian Hartigan; Teleplay by : Brian Hartigan & Hollis Ludlow-Carroll	March 5, 2011	109
"Oh Brother, Who Art Thou?" – Howie's (seemingly) long lost brother shows up at the hotel to claim his half. "Nothing But the Tooth" – The hotel staff, Poodle, Batty, and Hippo go on a wild scavenger hunt.
10	10	"A Fish This Big / Fizz Fuzz Bang"	Laurie Elliott; Tony Elliott	March 12, 2011	110
"A Fish This Big" – A squirrel saves Howie, but the latter gets the credit. "Fizz Fuzz Bang" – Poodle believes she's Captain Fizzy when she gets hit on the head by one of his pop bottles.
11	11	"Better Safe and Sorry / Narwhal's Contest"	Seán Cullen; Hollis Ludlow-Carroll	March 19, 2011	111
"Better Safe and Sorry" – Octo makes the Banana Cabana too safe. "Narwal's Contest" – Narwhal's biggest fan falls for Howie when Narwhal ignores her.
12	12	"Cool Paw Howie / S.S. Banana Cabana"	Phil McCordic; Scott Albert	March 26, 2011	112
"Cool Paw Howie" – Howie turns the hotel into a maximum security prison. "S.S. Banana Cabana" – The hotel gets sent afloat and crashes on an island.
13	13	"Robo-Howie / The Old Act"	Hollis Ludlow-Carroll; Séan Cullen	April 2, 2011	113
"Robo-Howie" – Poodle builds a robotic Howie to take over the Banana Cabana. "The Old Act" – Narwhal's old partner, Barney, shows up, much to Narwhal's chagrin.
14	14	"Jellyhead / Matter Over Mind"	Craig Martin; Miles Smith	April 9, 2011	114
"Jellyhead" – A jellyfish latches onto Octo and takes control of him. "Matter Over Mind" – Howie gets a remote control stuck to his head, and gains telekinetic powers after it gets wet.
15	15	"The Sun Howie Always Wanted / In The Deep End"	Tony Elliott; Hollis Ludlow-Carroll	April 16, 2011	115
"The Sun Howie Always Wanted" – Duck builds an artificial sun to create sunshine on a horrid day. "In The Deep End" – Narwhal confesses he can't swim when he's asked to do a trick for a whale magazine.
16	16	"Gone Banana / Imaginary Fiend"	Kevin Fraser; Miles Smith	April 23, 2011	116
"Gone Banana" – Howie, Octo and Duck try to find who stole the banana from the top of the hotel. "Imaginary Fiend" – Howie reunites with his imaginary friend, Platymoose, until the friend's pranks annoy everyone else.
17	17	"Who Inked the Bed? / Kikmee"	Craig Martin; Hollis Ludlow-Carroll	May 13, 2011	117
"Who Inked the Bed?" – Octo keeps inking the sheets when he is scared, making ink stains resembling the Cabana crew. "Kikmee" – Howie bets Bunny that if she goes one day without being angry, she won't have to wear the mascot costume.
18	18	"Candid Camaraderie / May the Best Loser Win"	J.D. Smith; Tony Elliott	May 27, 2011	118
"Candid Camaraderie" – Octo becomes popular online after Batty catches video of him doing a weird act. "May the Best Loser Win" – Octo tries to get his face on a cereal box by accomplishing something in Captain Fizzy's contest.
19	19	"Piggy Party / Living Dangerously"	Scott Albert; Miles Smith	June 10, 2011	119
"Piggy Party" – Howie tries to throw a surprise party for Piggy. "Living Dangerously" – Howie tests Dirk Danger branded products, which causes chaos.
20	20	"The Orange Fizzy Blues / Champion Gurgitator"	Kevin Fraser; Hollis Ludlow-Carroll	June 24, 2011	120
"The Orange Fizzy Blues" – Howie enters a contest so he can get a blue can of Captain Fizzy's soda. "Champion Gurgitator" – Howie enters an eating contest that could risk Piggy losing his favourite spoon to a yeti.
21	21	"Piggy's Secret / Sloth Unleashed"	Adam Halpern; Jennifer Cowan	August 14, 2011	121
"Piggy's Secret" – Howie tries to help Piggy get taller to join a dancing group. "Sloth Unleashed" – Howie attempts to train Sloth to be extreme so she can enter the Dirk Danger fan club.
22	22	"Stink Dog / Doll Pox"	Craig Martin; Hollis Ludlow-Carroll	August 28, 2011	122
"Stink Dog" – Howie refuses to take a bath, which causes him to stink up the Banana Cabana. "Doll Pox" – Everyone gets the chicken pox and Howie wants to join in order to be with them.
23	23	"Cat's Eight Lives / Crouching Narwhal, Hidden Piggy"	Hollis Ludlow-Carroll; Sean Benham	September 8, 2011	123
"Cat's Eight Lives" – Howie misplaces eight of Cat's nine lives around the hotel. "Crouching Narwhal, Hidden Piggy" – Piggy, Narwhal, and Radiation Rooster challenge each other in martial arts.
24	24	"Hotel of Horrors / Howieween"	Steve Westren; Miles Smith	October 31, 2011	124
"Hotel of Horrors" – Howie goes to the creepy side of the Banana Cabana, where his friends are freaks. "Howieween" – Howie decides to help Octo choose a Halloween costume, which is so scary, everyone thinks he's a monster.
25	25	"The Perfect Gift / Home for the Howiedays"	Hollis Ludlow-Carroll	December 7, 2011	125
"The Perfect Gift" – Narwhal tries to find a suitable gift for Bunny. " Home for the Howiedays" – Poodle has to stay at the Banana Cabana during Christmastime due to her hotel being destroyed.
26	26	"The Cabana Manana / Howie's Little Helper"	Hollis Ludlow-Carroll; J.D. Smith	December 14, 2011	126
"The Cabana Manana" – The gang trick Yeti into entering a surreal version of the Banana Cabana. "Howie's Little Helper" – Howie makes a first grader the manager for a school project.

=== Season 2 (2012) ===
No. overall	No. in season	Title	Written by	Original release date	Prod. code
27	1	"Horn Swoggled / The Night Shift"	Seán Cullen; Hollis Ludlow-Carroll	February 4, 2012	201
"Horn Swoggled" – When Narwhal loses his horn, he loses his musical mojo. "The Night Shift" – Howie discovers there's a night shift at the Banana Cabana filled with fun activities.
28	2	"Trash to the Past / The Green Banana"	Scott Albert; Andrew Harrison	February 11, 2012	202
"Trash to the Past" – The gang try to find out why garbage is falling from the sky. "The Green Banana" – Howie's attempt to make an ecofriendly hotel has hostile drawbacks.
29	3	"Howie's Pet Project / Dr. Howie and Mr. Howyena"	James Nadler; Seán Cullen	February 18, 2012	203
"Howie's Pet Project" – To prove to Bunny he's responsible, Howie looks after a pineapple. "Dr. Howie and Mr. Howyena" – Howie creates a potion that transforms him into a literal party animal. This episode is based on the events of The Strange Case of Dr Jekyll and Mr Hyde.
30	4	"Octo vs. Batty / Needle Day"	Hollis Ludlow-Carroll; Steve Westren	February 25, 2012	204
"Octo vs. Batty" – Batty moves into the hotel, but Octo is suspicious of his intentions. "Needle Day" – Howie wants to give Narwhal a needle to cure him of a spreading disease.
31	5	"The Brother and Sister Games / Freebie Jeebies"	Hollis Ludlow-Carroll; Andrew Harrison	March 10, 2012	205
"The Brother and Sister Games" – Poodle and Howie compete in a sibling themed competition. "Freebie Jeebies" – Howie sells coupons to the customers, but the action quickly gets out of hand.
32	6	"Howie's Staycation / A Helping Paw"	Hollis Ludlow-Carroll; James Nadler	March 17, 2012	206
"Howie's Staycation" – While on "vacation", Howie discovers that a moose wants to do bodily harm to him. "A Helping Hoof" – Duck becomes Sloth's personal assistant.
33	7	"Octopi P.I. / The Lost Stunt"	Seán Cullen; Jennifer Cowan	March 24, 2012	207
"Octopi P.I." – Octo and Howie attempt to find who stole Narwhal's spit sock. "The Lost Stunt" – Howie tries to prove he's Dirk Danger's No. 1 fan by performing Dirk Danger's lost stunt.
34	8	"Trance Romance / Wooing Warty"	Scott Albert; Laurie Elliott	March 31, 2012	208
"Trance Romance" – Sloth uses hypnotic spray on Howie, which makes him romantic. "Wooing Warty" – Howie helps Piggy woo a warthog the latter has fallen for.
35	9	"Octo Gets Tough / Narwhal's Birthday"	Scott Albert; Steve Westren	April 28, 2012	209
"Octo Gets Tough" – Octo becomes a bit too fearless after nearly getting hit by the banana. "Narwhal's Birthday" – Howie discovers Narwhal and Octo are related.
36	10	"All Night Long / Camp Stinka-wah-way"	Scott Albert; Kevin Fraser	May 12, 2012	210
"All Night Long" – Howie and Octo stay up all night to win Dirk Danger's latest video game. "Camp Stinka-wah-way" – Howie treats the gang to a weekend getaway at Radiation Rooster's haunted campsite.
37	11	"Ducking Duck / Banana Split"	Miles Smith; Andrew Harrison	May 26, 2012	211
"Ducking Duck" – Duck is crowned king of the island, but his demands get more excruciating over time. "Banana Split" – A failed stunt splits the Cabana in half.
38	12	"Cap'n Fizzy Fizzles / Banned!"	Steve Dylan; Hollis Ludlow-Carroll	June 9, 2012	212
"Cap'n Fizzy Fizzles" – Howie tries to help Captain Fizzy stay in business when a rival soda outnumbers him. "Banned!" – Mayor Trout gets annoyed with Howie and his stunts and bans him from the island.
39	13	"Bumbag Bummer / Dirk Dubious"	Seán Cullen; Craig Martin	June 23, 2012	213
"Bumbag Bummer" – Sloth becomes famous for her invention: the bumbag. "Dirk Dubious" – Howie thinks there are two Dirk Dangers visiting the hotel, when one of them is really Duck in disguise.
40	14	"Miss Surrounding Area / Campaign Pains"	Laurie Elliott; Andrew Harrison	July 7, 2012	214
"Miss Surrounding Area" – Batty dresses up as a girl and competes against Bunny in a beauty contest. "Campaign Pains" – Howie runs for mayor, unaware of how much work comes with the job.

=== Season 3 (2013) ===
No. overall	No. in season	Title	Written by	Original release date	Prod. code
41	1	"The Rotation Situation / The Tail of Howie"	Hollis Ludlow-Carroll	April 15, 2013	301
"The Rotation Situation": Duck speeds up the Earth's rotation, causing the staff to age faster. "The Tail of Howie": Howie tries to achieve the things he'd always wanted to do after failing to catch his tail.
42	2	"The Big Burp Theory / Who's Howie?"	Jeremy Winkels; Hollis Ludlow-Carroll	April 16, 2013	302
"The Big Burp Theory": Howie must stop burping when royalty comes. "Who's Howie?": Howie gets amnesia, and everyone uses this to their advantage.
43	3	"Insane in the Brain / Laugh Piggy Laugh"	Jeremy Winkels; Eric Lunsky	April 17, 2013	303
"Insane in the Brain": Octo and Bunny go inside Howie's brain to retrieve a password he forgot. "Laugh Piggy Laugh": Howie helps Piggy regain his sense of humor.
44	4	"Picture Day / Part Timer"	Steve Dylan; Hollis Ludlow-Carroll	April 18, 2013	304
"Picture Day": Howie wants the Cabana to take the staff picture with no flaws. "Part Timer": Howie decides to get a part-time job.
45	5	"Howie's Allergy / Figure Fight"	Hollis Ludlow-Carroll; Garner Haines	April 19, 2013	305
"Howie's Allergy": Howie gives up sugar, revealing he's more stable without it. "Figure Fight": Howie and Octo fight over a rare Dirk Danger doll.
46	6	"Mini Howies / Dear Dirk"	Hollis Ludlow-Carroll; Richard Clark	May 13, 2013	306
"Mini Howies": Duck creates a bunch of mini Howies, but they eventually cause chaos. "Dear Dirk": Howie answers all of Dirk Danger's fan mail.
47	7	"These Sleeps Were Made for Walkin' / The Best Friends Synchronized Dance, Ice Sculpting, Costume and Explosions Competition"	Kurt Firla; Hollis Ludlow-Carroll	May 14, 2013	307
"The Sleeps Were Made for Walkin'": Howie enters Octo in a sleepwalking competition. "The Best Friends Synchronized Dance, Ice Sculpting, Costumes and Explosions Competition": Howie and Octo put their friendship to the test.
48	8	"Don't Follow the Leader / The Snow-Tel"	Andrew Harrison; Eric Lunsky	May 15, 2013	308
"Don't Follow the Leader": Octo and Howie try to win a role-playing game with Piggy's assistance. "The Snow-Tel": The Banana Canana gets covered in snow.
49	9	"Luck Be a Robot / Family Business"	Andrew Harrison; Hollis Ludlow-Carroll	May 16, 2013	309
"Luck Be A Robot": Bunny becomes Howie's good luck charm in a robot derby. "Family Business": Howie and Poodle have to run a successful business for a day or their dad will shut down both their hotels.
50	10	"No Howies Allowed / Howie Day"	Hollis Ludlow-Carroll	May 17, 2013	310
"No Howies Allowed": Octo, Piggy, and Narwhal must stop Howie from invading Bunny's sleepover. "Howie Day": Howie wants his own day, when another animal of the same name gets his own.
51	11	"Sun Scream / It's Duck's Party"	Steve Westren; Hollis Ludlow-Carroll	May 21, 2013	311
"Sun Scream": Duck makes his own sunscreen that creates disaster when used. "It's Duck's Party": Narwhal is in charge of making sure no one interrupts Duck's exclusive party.
52	12	"Father's Day / Hambo 1: Galactic Super Swine of the Wild West"	Seán Cullen; Steve Dylan	May 22, 2013	312
"Father's Day": Duck finds an egg, and becomes very overprotective. "Hambo 1: Galactic Super Swine of the Wild West": Dirk gives up stunting to become a chef, while Piggy decides to try acting.

== Production ==
The series was produced by 9 Story Media Group for Cartoon Network and YTV. Noah Z. Jones is the creator of the series, while Brad Ferguson is the director. Executive producers includes Vince Commisso, Steve Jarosz, and Jones. Other staff for the series include Tanya Green as supervising producer, Tristan Homer as producer and Mark Satterthwaite as creative producer.

Development for the series started as early as 2006.

On October 16, 2009, Aaron H. Bynum, news editor of Animation Insider, announced that the series entered production. Commisso, president and CEO of 9 Story, was pleasantly surprised and charmed for the production of Almost Naked Animals and said: "We are very excited to be commencing production on Almost Naked Animals,". "We spent a great deal of time in development, ensuring the characters, the pacing and the tone of the show was [sic] precise. It is extremely gratifying to see our work come to fruition and the end result is this high-quality, curiously funny animated property."

== Home media ==
Episodes of Almost Naked Animals are available for digital download through the iTunes Music Store, which are split into two volumes. Roadshow Home Entertainment released a 95-minute Region 4 DVD of the show on December 1, 2011. In 2012, NCircle Entertainment released episodes on DVD for Canada and the US. In the UK, Abbey Home Media released episodes on DVD.

The show is available to watch on Tubi.

== Reception ==
=== Critical response ===
In June 2011, Almost Naked Animals was picked as one of People Magazine's top children's shows to watch in the US. Common Sense Media rated the show 3 stars out of 5, with the review stating that "The show's writing is smart enough that adults will get some laughs right alongside their kids". Despite this, however, the series mostly received negative reviews.

=== Ratings ===
During the week of November 20, 2011, the show has been receiving high ratings on CITV in the UK and has been the most watched after school children's program amongst kids aged 4–9.

=== Awards and nominations ===
Year	Association	Category	Result
2011	Gemini Awards	Best Writing in a Children's or Youth Program or Series — "Better Safe and Sorry", written by Seán Cullen	Nominated
2013	Canadian Screen Awards	Best Animated Program or Series	Nominated
2013	Canadian Screen Awards	Best Direction in an Animated Program or Series — "The Green Banana", directed by Brad Ferguson	Nominated
2013	Canadian Screen Awards	Best Performance in an Animated Program or Series— "Horn Swoggled", Seán Cullen as Narwhal & Piggy	Won

== Other media ==
=== Toys and merchandising ===
In 2011, The Licensing Shop signed products in the US market for Almost Naked Animals. Freeze secured rights for t-shirts, fashion tops and hoodies in all sizes while ABG Accessories produced cold weather accessories, spring and summer headwear and rainwear including umbrellas and slickers for the show. In 2012, Cafepress agreed to make Almost Naked Animals plushies, water bottles and T-shirts.

=== Online game ===
In January 2012, it was announced that 9 Story and Game Pill were creating an Almost Naked Animals online game entitled "Cabana Craze." The game was released on September 25, 2012 and can be found at CabanaCraze.com.
