= Ruby Gloom =

Canadian animated television series

- Created by: Martin Hsu
- Based on: Ruby Gloom by Martin Hsu
- Developed by: Carolyn Hay
- Written by: Carolyn Hay; Nicole Demerse; Alan Resnick; Alex Nussbaum; John van Bruggen
- Directed by: Robin Budd
- Voices of: Sarah Gadon; Stacey DePass; Emily Hampshire; Scott McCord; David Berni; Jeremy Harris; Adrian Truss; Peter Keleghan; Barbara Mamabolo; Stephanie Anne Mills; Harvey Atkin; Ron Rubin; Derek McGrath
- Theme music composer: Ray Parker; Tom Szczesniak
- Opening theme: "Ruby Gloom" by Jeen O'Brien
- Ending theme: "Ruby Gloom" (Instrumental)
- Composers: Ray Parker; Tom Szczesniak
- Country of origin: Canada
- Original language: English
- No. of seasons: 2
- No. of episodes: 40

Production
- Executive producers: Scott Dyer; Doug Murphy; Rita Street
- Editor: Annellie Rose Samuel
- Running time: 22 minutes
- Production company: Nelvana

Original release
- Network: YTV
- Release: October 13, 2006 – June 1, 2008

Ruby Gloom is a Canadian animated television series based on the Mighty Fine apparel line of the same name, created by illustrator Martin Hsu. It was produced by Nelvana and aired on YTV in Canada. The series began with a pilot in 2003, and then became a full series that aired for two seasons from October 13, 2006, to June 1, 2008. 40 episodes were produced.

== Overview ==
The series focuses on the daily life of a kindhearted rag doll-like angelic girl named Ruby Gloom, who lives in a large Victorian mansion in the town of Gloomsville. Through a seemingly macabre atmosphere, Ruby gets into quirky and comical misadventures with her ensemble of gothic friends: Doom Kitty, Iris, Misery, Skull Boy, Frank, Len, and Poe.

== History ==
=== Franchise ===
In 2001, Ruby Gloom began as a drawing on a piece of paper by illustrator Martin Hsu and was then spawned into a franchise by the U.S. company Mighty Fine three years later. Ruby Gloom began as a stationery line, and was featured on pencil cases, backpacks, clothing, keychains, and plush toys which were sold through Doeworld, a subsidiary of Mighty Fine. Books were also made for the series, the first being Ruby Gloom's Keys to Happiness in 2004, as well as two calendars for 2004 and 2005. The product line had an interactive website where users could chat in a forum, and click around for free things, such as desktop icons and screensavers.

Towards the end of 2004, the website changed to a forum only dubbed "The Mansion". By the end of 2004, the website had been redesigned and featured an interactive mansion to explore and user-submitted artwork. Ruby was shown smiling on the roof with her cat Doom Kitty. By 2006, the forum was removed, and the website had taken on a format aimed at kids.

=== Television series ===
In 2005, Mighty Fine and co-creator, illustrator Martin Hsu, licensed the TV rights to Ruby Gloom to the Canadian animation studio Nelvana. In May 2005, the series was announced in the 2005 issue of Animation Magazine.

== Main characters ==
- Ruby Gloom (voiced by Sarah Gadon) is the titular main protagonist. Contrary to her name, she is incredibly optimistic.
- Doom Kitty is Ruby's pet cat. She usually knows what's going on, but lacks the ability to speak to let others know.
- Iris (voiced by Stacey DePass) a hyperactive cyclops who is almost as optimistic as Ruby.
- Misery (voiced by Emily Hampshire; singing voice provided by Jeen O'Brien) is one of Ruby's friends who is always sad and suffers from bad luck, a trait shared with her family members.
- Skull Boy (voiced by Scott McCord) is a skeleton with many talents that lacks the attention to focus on one thing.
- Frank and Len (voiced by David Berni and Jeremy Harris, respectively) a monster with two heads who likes to play guitar.
- Poe (voiced by Adrian Truss) a sophisticated crow with and English accent. He is usually accompanied by his fellow crows, Edger and Allen.
- Scaredy Bat (voiced by Peter Keleghan) is a paranoid bat who is too scared to even fly.
- Boo Boo (voiced by Barbara Mamabolo) is a ghost who prefers mischievous pranks over genuine scaring.
- Mr. Buns is a stuffed doll made of leftover socks.

== Episodes ==
=== Series overview ===
Season	Episodes	Originally released	
Season	Episodes	First released	Last released
1	20	October 13, 2006	August 26, 2007
2	20	July 1, 2007	June 1, 2008

In some regions, the series has three seasons, with the first two consisting of 13 episodes and the third consisting of 14 episodes. This list follows the original Canadian episode order, which labels the 40 episodes as two seasons with 20 episodes in each.

Most of the episodes contain a short skit at the beginning and end of the episode. "Gloomer Rumor" and both parts of "Last Train to Gloomsville", the first and last episodes of the series, are the only episodes to not have two shorts, but just one (an ending skit for "Gloomer Rumor" and "Last Train to Gloomsville, Part II" and a beginning skit for "Last Train to Gloomsville, Part I"). Both parts of "Hair(Less): The Musical" have no shorts.

=== Season 1 (2006–07) ===
No. overall	No. in season	Title	Written by	Original release date
1	1	"Gloomer Rumor"	Carolyn Hay	October 13, 2006
2	2	"Grounded in Gloomsville"	Carolyn Hay	October 22, 2006
3	3	"Doom with a View"	Carolyn Hay	October 29, 2006
4	4	"Missing Buns"	Nicole Demerse	November 5, 2006
5	5	"Iris Springs Eternal"	Alan Resnick	November 12, 2006
6	6	"Science Fair or Foul"	Alex Nussbaum	November 19, 2006
7	7	"Poe-Ranoia"	Nicole Demerse	November 26, 2006
8	8	"Unsung Hero"	Carolyn Hay	December 3, 2006
9	9	"Quadro-Gloomia"	Alan Resnick	December 10, 2006
10	10	"Skull Boys Don't Cry"	Carolyn Bennett	December 17, 2006
11	11	"Bad Hare Day"	Alex Nussbaum	December 24, 2006
12	12	"Happy Yam Ween"	Carolyn Bennett	December 31, 2006
13	13	"Ruby Cubed"	Carolyn Hay	January 7, 2007
14	14	"Shaken, Not Scared"	Robin Stein	March 18, 2007
15	15	"Once in a Blue Luna"	Alan Resnick	April 9, 2007
16	16	"Time Flies"	John van Bruggen	July 29, 2007
17	17	"Lucky Me"	Alan Resnick	August 5, 2007
18	18	"Misery Loves Company"	Carolyn Bennett	August 12, 2007
19	19	"Sunny Daze"	Carolyn Hay	June 10, 2007
20	20	"Broken Records"	Alex Nussbaum	August 26, 2007

=== Season 2 (2007–08) ===
No. overall	No. in season	Title	Written by	Original release date
21	1	"Gloomates"	Alan Resnick	July 1, 2007
22	2	"Tooth or Dare"	Nicole Demerse	September 9, 2007
23	3	"Venus de Gloomsville"	Alan Resnick	September 16, 2007
24	4	"Seeing Eye to Eyes"	John van Bruggen	September 23, 2007
25	5	"Name That Toon"	John van Bruggen	September 30, 2007
26	6	"Skull in the Family"	Carolyn Hay	October 7, 2007
27	7	"Writing on the Wall"	Alan Resnick	September 24, 2007
28	8	"Déjà Vu – Again"	Alan Resnick	November 11, 2007
29	9	"Ubergloom"	Nicole Demerse	November 18, 2007
30	10	"Pet Poepulation"	Adrian Truss	March 30, 2008
31	11	"Hair(Less): The Musical"	Carolyn Hay	November 2, 2007
32	12	"Hair(Less): The Musical"	Carolyn Hay	November 16, 2007
33	13	"Beat Goes On"	John van Bruggen	April 13, 2008
34	14	"Out of This World"	Alan Resnick	April 20, 2008
35	15	"Forget Me Not"	Nicole Demerse	April 27, 2008
36	16	"Frank & Len: Unplugged"	Carolyn Hay	May 11, 2008
37	17	"I'll Be Home for Misery"	Alan Resnick	May 4, 2008
38	18	"Disaster Becomes You"	Nicole Demerse	May 18, 2008
39	19	"Last Train to Gloomsville"	Carolyn Hay	June 1, 2008
40	20	"Last Train to Gloomsville"	Carolyn Hay	June 1, 2008

== Reception ==
Ruby Gloom received generally positive reviews from both critics and audiences, praising it for its characters, writing, soundtrack, and plot. It would go on to garner a cult following.

Common Sense Media's Joyce Slaton gave the series a rating of four stars out of five, saying: "A nice mix of sweet-and-sour, Ruby Gloom's dark gothic setting underscores all the cooperation and kindness. Adults will enjoy jokes that kids may miss, such as when it's revealed that Ruby eats Glum Flakes cereal for breakfast. And all but the most sensitive kids will be too enraptured by fantastic elements like talking pictures and a school for ghosts to be unnerved by dark elements like Misery's constant talk of disasters and death."

=== Awards and honors ===
Ruby Gloom was nominated for a Gemini Award in the category of "Best Animated Program or Series."

The script for the episode "Happy Yam Ween", written by Carolyn Bennett, was a finalist in the 2007 Canadian Screenwriting Awards.

== Telecast and home media ==
Ruby Gloom premiered on YTV in Canada on October 13, 2006, along with the final episode's airing on June 1, 2008, with repeats until early 2010. Repeats aired on Nickelodeon Canada from September 1, 2014, to June 2, 2025 (it has since moved to Boomerang). In the United Kingdom, the series aired on Pop and Pop Girl in 2008. Irish network RTÉ2 aired the series in 2010. It also aired on 2x2 in Russia, Super RTL in Germany, Rai Gulp in Italy, RTP2 in Portugal, Pakapaka in Argentina and ABC1 and ABC3 (now ABC TV and ABC Me respectively) in Australia in 2008. In the Arab world, it aired on MBC 3, Al-Majd TV Network and Arutz HaYeladim, and it also aired on Cartoon Network Japan in 2009 until the early 2010s.

=== DVD releases ===
==== Region 1 ====
Canada – There are two DVDs available from Nelvana (in association with the Corus-owned television network YTV). The DVDs present the episodes in NTSC 1.85:1 (16x9) anamorphic widescreen, with English Dolby Digital 5.1 sound and French Dolby Digital 2.0 sound. There are no subtitles nor closed captions. The opening title sequence on the DVDs is the full version, and not the edited version that airs on YTV.

The DVDs in release order are:

Ruby Gloom: Grounded in Gloomsville – Contains the first four episodes of the series (as listed above), plus a behind-the-scenes special feature showing the voice recording of the episode "Hair(Less): The Musical" (parts 1 and 2).

Ruby Gloom: Misery Loves Company – Contains the episodes "Iris Springs Eternal", "Poe-Ranoia", "Skull Boys Don't Cry", and "Misery Loves Company", with no special features.

Following this, a third DVD entitled Ruby Gloom: Pet Poepulation was scheduled for release on September 9, 2009, but became unavailable.

U.S. – In 2013, kaBoom! Entertainment and Phase 4 Films released six Ruby Gloom DVDs in the U.S. Each disc contains four episodes, arranged as a continuous show, with the repeated opening songs and individual mini-episodes edited out. All the mini-episodes are included separately as a bonus feature, instead of being incorporated in their main episode as originally broadcast.

The discs are as follows:

Ruby Gloom: Happiest Girl in the World – Contains the episodes "Gloomer Rumor", "Doom with a View", "Missing Buns", and "Iris Springs Eternal".

Ruby Gloom: I Heart Rock & Roll – Contains the episodes "Unsung Hero", "Quadra-Gloomia", "Skull Boys Don't Cry", and "Bad Hare Day".

Ruby Gloom: Gloomates – Contains the episodes "Gloomates", "Seeing Eye to Eyes", "Name That Toon", and "Broken Records".

Ruby Gloom: Grounded in Gloomsville – Contains the episodes "Grounded in Gloomsville", "Ruby Cubed", "Once in a Blue Luna", and "Time Flies".

Ruby Gloom: Tooth or Dare – Contains the episodes "Tooth or Dare", "Skull in the Family", "Shaken, Not Scared", and "Misery Loves Company".

Ruby Gloom: Welcome to Gloomsville – Contains the episodes "Venus de Gloomsville", "Science Fair or Foul", "Poe-Ranoia", and "Happy Yam Ween".

As with the Canadian release, the DVDs present the episodes in NTSC 1.85:1 (16x9) anamorphic widescreen, with English Dolby Digital 5.1 sound, but they have Spanish Dolby Digital 2.0 sound instead of French.

Brazil – Seasons one and two were released on three-disc DVD box sets; however, the box sets do not include all the episodes from each season (despite the DVD covers indicating this). Both box sets are presented in NTSC 1.33:1 (4x3) full screen (the sides of the widescreen image are cut to create the full screen ratio, also known as pan and scan) with Portuguese and English Dolby Digital 5.1 sound. The opening title sequence is the edited version that airs on most television networks (such as the Canadian YTV). Neither of the box sets include any special features.

The box sets are:

Ruby Gloom: Full season 1 – Contains the first thirteen episodes from season one.

Ruby Gloom: Full season 2 – Contains thirteen episodes (the remaining seven episodes from season one, plus the first six episodes from season two).

==== Region 2 ====
France – Ruby Gloom: 1 is available from France Télévisions Distribution (in association with the television network France 3) and contains the first six episodes of the series (as listed above). The episodes are presented in PAL 1.33:1 (4x3) full screen (the sides of the widescreen image are cut to create the full screen ratio, also known as pan and scan) with French Dolby Digital 2.0 sound.

Germany – Two DVDs were made available from SPV GmbH (in association with the television network Super RTL) containing the first eight episodes of the series (as listed above), with each DVD consisting of four episodes. The episodes are presented in PAL 1.33:1 (4x3) full screen (the sides of the widescreen image are cut to create the full screen ratio, also known as pan and scan) with German Dolby Digital 2.0 sound.

On October 15, 2010, Edel Germany GmbH released Ruby Gloom – Willkommen in Gloomsville (Ruby Gloom – Welcome to Gloomsville), which contains the first seven episodes of the series (as listed above).

Japan – A DVD box set entitled Ruby Gloom's Bible is available from Sony Music Entertainment Japan and contains 20 of the series' first 24 episodes (as listed above) in random order on five DVDs. The episodes are presented in NTSC 1.85:1 widescreen with Japanese Dolby Digital 2.0 sound.

United Kingdom – In the United Kingdom, Platform Entertainment Ltd. released a DVD.

==== Region 4 ====
Australia – There are four DVD volumes available from Magna Pacific containing the first 16 episodes of the series (as listed above), with each volume consisting of four episodes. The episodes are presented in PAL 1.33:1 (4x3) full screen (the sides of the widescreen image are cut to create the full screen ratio, also known as pan and scan) with English Dolby Digital 2.0 sound.

=== Online streaming ===
Currently, the series is now streaming on FilmRise Kids, Tubi, Pluto TV, and Amazon Prime, but more recently, as of 2020, the series has become available on demand via YouTube.
