= Ernie Butler (comedian) =

Canadian comedian (died 2007)

Ernie Butler (died August 29, 2007) was a stand-up comedian and comedy impresario in Montreal, Quebec for 30 years.

He was the proprietor of the Comedy Nest at the Pepsi Forum, and supported top-notch skill from the time he started Stitches on Crescent Street in 1979. Butler was the presenter of The CJAD Comedy Hour on AM radio and also co-hosted that station's Irish Show.

Butler was a supporter of charities, often lending his club for fund-raising events.

== Personal life ==
Butler overcame his compulsions (illicit drugs and alcohol) and supported others in their efforts to do so.

He died of stomach cancer August 29, 2007, after a short illness. He is survived by his wife Marie and three children, Silver, Ryan, and Shannon.
