= New Eden =

Canadian TV series

- Created by: Evany Rosen; Kayla Lorette
- Country of origin: Canada
- No. of seasons: 1
- No. of episodes: 8

Original release
- Network: Crave
- Release: December 31, 2019

New Eden is a Canadian television mockumentary series, created by and starring Evany Rosen and Kayla Lorette. The series centres on Grace Lee (Rosen) and Katherine Wryfield (Lorette), the leaders of an all-female cult compound, through the narrative frame of a fictional true crime documentary series profiling the cult's descent into chaos and murder. The first season was directed by Aleysa Young.

The first season was released on the Crave streaming service on December 31, 2019, one day ahead of the promoted release date of January 1, 2020.

The series starred Evany Rosen as Grace Lee, Kayla Lorette as Katherine Wryfield, Leah Doz as Max Solomon, Caitlin Howden as Sharon Birnbaum, and Rielle Braid as Amy Michelle.

== Episodes ==
No. overall	No. in season	Title	Directed by	Written by	Original release date
1	1	"Who Are These Women?"	Aleysa Young	Evany Rosen, Kayla Lorette	December 31, 2019
Former cult leaders turned convicts, Katherine Wryfield and Grace Lee are interviewed about New Eden.
2	2	"Funny Honey"	Aleysa Young	Evany Rosen, Kayla Lorette	December 31, 2019
The incident at the 1977 Halworth Fall Fair where New Eden sells honey spiked with psychedelic compounds.
3	3	"Go with Gaion"	Aleysa Young	Evany Rosen, Kayla Lorette	December 31, 2019
Amy makes an unexpected announcement while the police start investigating New Eden.
4	4	"Party's Over Girls"	Aleysa Young	Evany Rosen, Kayla Lorette	December 31, 2019
New Eden's funds are dwindling. Grace comes up with a plan to save the farm, but Katherine thinks it only makes matters worse.
5	5	"A Whole Lotta Buzz"	Aleysa Young	Evany Rosen, Kayla Lorette	December 31, 2019
The police raid of the New Eden compound.
6	6	"My Lord"	Aleysa Young	Evany Rosen, Kayla Lorette	December 31, 2019
Coverage of the 1983 trial.
7	7	"Forbidden Fruit"	Aleysa Young	Evany Rosen, Kayla Lorette	December 31, 2019
Grace and Katherine's release is only a few months away. The documentarians Travis and Jake come clean about their intentions for the documentary.
8	8	"Helen Lafayette"	Aleysa Young	Evany Rosen, Kayla Lorette	December 31, 2019
1994 recap of the three-year manhunt for Helen Lafayette.
