= Evany Rosen =

Canadian comedian and actress

- Born: Ontario, Canada
- Occupations: Actress, writer
- Years active: 2011–present

Evany Rosen is a Canadian comedian and actress, most noted as a founding member of the comedy troupe Picnicface and as co-creator with Kayla Lorette of the Crave original series New Eden.

== Early life and education ==
Rosen was born in Ontario to Bala (née Jaison) and Marc Rosen. She attended the University of King's College in Halifax, Nova Scotia, graduating with a degree in early modern studies. In Halifax, she formed Picnicface with several of her friends. The troupe achieved significant success on YouTube before launching a Canadian Comedy Award-winning sketch comedy series on The Comedy Network in 2011.

== Career ==
Following Picnicface's cancellation, Rosen appeared in the web series Space Janitors, for which she was a Canadian Comedy Award nominee for Best Female Performance in a Web Series at the 15th Canadian Comedy Awards in 2014 and at the 16th Canadian Comedy Awards in 2015. She has also had voice roles in cartoons, including Total Drama Presents: The Ridonculous Race, Winston Steinburger and Sir Dudley Ding Dong, Total DramaRama, Powerbirds, Hotel Transylvania: The Series and Mysticons, and guest appearances in television series including Saving Hope, Workin' Moms, Baroness von Sketch Show and Pretty Hard Cases.

In 2017, she published What I Think Happened: An Underresearched History of the Western World, a book of humorous essays about history.

In 2020, Rosen and Lorette narrated the livestreamed presentation of Craft in Scripted Programming categories for the 8th Canadian Screen Awards. In the same year she was announced as a member of the writing staff for Fort Puleyne, Thomas Middleditch's historical comedy pilot.

In 2024, Rosen created and played a recurring role in the show Davey & Jonesie's Locker.

== Filmography ==
=== Film ===
| Year | Title | Role | Notes |
|---|---|---|---|
| 2011 | Roller Town | Beth | |
| 2021 | Thomas & Friends: Race for the Sodor Cup | Jiff | US/UK; Original dub |

=== Television ===
| Year | Title | Role | Notes |
|---|---|---|---|
| 2011 | Call Me Fitz | Paramedic | Episode: "Hell Hath No Drink Limit" |
| 2011 | Picnicface | Various | 13 episodes |
| 2012 | Dad Drives | Kate | 2 episodes |
| 2012–2014 | Space Janitors | Edith Kingpin | 15 episodes |
| 2014 | Saving Hope | Jenny Akino | Episode: "Wide Awake" |
| 2014 | Rocket Monkeys | M.A.U.D. | Episode: "Happy Gus Day/Monkey Proof" |
| 2015 | Odd Squad | 21-year-old Olive | Episode: "Trading Places/Bad Lemonade" |
| 2015 | Total Drama Presents: The Ridonculous Race | MacArthur | 25 episodes |
| 2016 | True Dating Stories | Ariel | Episode: "Ariel's Date" |
| 2016 | Winston Steinburger and Sir Dudley Ding Dong | Pam the Destroyer | 52 episodes |
| 2017 | Workin' Moms | Britney | Episode: "The Coxswain" |
| 2017–2018 | Mysticons | Emerald Goldenbraid/Mysticon Knight | 21 episodes |
| 2017–2019 | Hotel Transylvania: The Series | Wendy Blob | 40 episodes |
| 2017–2021 | Baroness von Sketch Show | | 10 episodes; also writer and story editor |
| 2017–2018 | Wishfart | Dusty | Recurring role |
| 2018 | Bakugan: Battle Planet | Bukimina / Pandorous | Episode: "Baku-Gear/Bakugan Rock!" |
| 2018–2022 | Total DramaRama | MacArthur | 34 episodes |
| 2019–2020 | D.N. Ace | Hide-And-Sneak/Heidi | 10 episodes; also writer |
| 2020 | New Eden | Grace Lee | 8 episodes; also creator |
| 2020–2021 | Powerbirds | Clawdette | 5 episodes |
| 2021 | Pretty Hard Cases | Finley Silva | Episode: "Flowers" |
| 2022–2023 | Thomas & Friends: All Engines Go | Jiff (US) | 2 episodes |
| 2023 | My Little Pony: Make Your Mark | Violet Frost | Episode: "Secrets of Starlight" |
| 2024 | Total Drama Island | MacArthur | Episode: "Working K9 to 5" |
| 2024 | Davey & Jonesie's Locker | Principal Debbie Neighbors | Recurring role; also creator |
