= Jo-Anna Downey =

Canadian comedian

- Born: February 1, 1967; Montreal, Quebec, Canada
- Died: December 1, 2016 (aged 49); Toronto, Ontario, Canada
- Notable work: Open Mike at Spirits, Standing on the Danforth

Comedy career
- Medium: Stand-up comedy

Jo-Anna Downey (February 1, 1967 – December 2016) was a Canadian stand-up comedian.

She was the host of two weekly Toronto, Ontario comedy shows, Open Mike at Spirits (since 1996) and Standing on the Danforth.

Downey was diagnosed with amyotrophic lateral sclerosis in 2012, and retired from performing in 2013. She died on December 1, 2016.
