= Michael: Every Day =

- Also known as: Michael: Tuesdays and Thursdays
- Genre: Sitcom
- Created by: Bob Martin; Don McKellar
- Written by: Bob Martin; Matt Watts; Susan Coyne; Mark McKinney; Katie Ford
- Directed by: Don McKellar; Alison MacLean; Patricia Rozema
- Starring: Matt Watts; Bob Martin; Jennifer Irwin; Pablo Silveira; Martha Burns; Tommie-Amber Pirie; Ed Asner; Sandra Oh; Al Karim; Melody Johnson; Lynne Griffin
- Composer: Jonathan Goldsmith
- Country of origin: Canada
- No. of seasons: 2
- No. of episodes: 18

Production
- Executive producers: Bob Martin; Don McKellar; Matt Watts
- Production locations: Ottawa, Ontario
- Running time: approx. 22 minutes
- Production companies: Rhombus Media; Canadian Broadcasting Corporation

Original release
- Network: CBC
- Release: September 14, 2011 – January 29, 2017

Michael: Every Day, formerly known as Michael: Tuesdays and Thursdays, is a Canadian television sitcom that debuted on CBC Television in 2011.

Described by the National Post as a cross between What About Bob? and Frasier, the show stars Matt Watts as Michael, a neurotic young man undergoing regular psychotherapy, and Bob Martin as David, his therapist who views Michael as an ideal guinea pig for the experimental psychiatric techniques he hopes will turn him into a bestselling pop psychology writer. Filmed in Ottawa, Ontario, the show's cast also includes Jennifer Irwin, Pablo Silveira, Martha Burns and Tommie-Amber Pirie.

The series is based in part on Watts' own past struggles with anxiety disorder.

== Episodes ==
=== Season 1 ===
The series was greenlit in February 2011, shot during June of that year at an average episode budget of $150,000 CAD and premiered on CBC on September 14, 2011, at 9 pm. After two episodes, the series was moved to Tuesdays at 9PM. The show was not renewed for the 2012–13 season.

The first season was released on DVD in Canada in 2014 by VideoWorks. In 2015, it became available in the United States through Hulu. In Canada, it is available to stream through the CBC's website.

No.	Title	Directed by	Written by	Original release date	Canadian viewers (millions)
1	"Small Talk"	Don McKellar	Bob Martin	September 14, 2011	0.321
2	"Unscripted Conversation"	Don McKellar	Matt Watts	September 21, 2011	0.199
3	"Vomiting"	Don McKellar	Bob Martin	September 27, 2011	0.153
4	"Sleeping with People"	Don McKellar	Bob Martin	October 4, 2011	0.234
5	"Bridges"	Alison Maclean	Matt Watts	October 11, 2011	0.260
6	"Trust"	Alison Maclean	Bob Martin	October 18, 2011	0.178
7	"Heights"	Alison Maclean	Mark McKinney	October 25, 2011	0.273
8	"Being Alone"	Patricia Rozema	Matt Watts	November 1, 2011	0.209
9	"Ridicule"	Patricia Rozema	Susan Coyne	November 8, 2011	0.251
10	"Sweating"	Patricia Rozema	Susan Coyne	November 15, 2011	0.187
11	"Failure"	Don McKellar	Katie Ford	November 29, 2011	0.223
12	"Endings"	Don McKellar	Bob Martin	December 6, 2011	0.145

=== Season 2 ===
In March 2015, the CBC announced that the series would return with six new episodes in the 2015–16 season. The new episodes were ultimately delayed, however, and premiered in January 2017 under the new series title Michael: Every Day. The series was not renewed for a third season.

No.	Title	Directed by	Written by	Original release date	Canadian viewers (millions)
1	"Squirrels"	Don McKellar	Matt Watts	January 15, 2017	0.189
2	"Making a Friend"	Don McKellar	Matt Watts	January 15, 2017	0.136
3	"Public Urination"	Don McKellar	Lynn Coady	January 22, 2017	N/A
4	"Panic Camp"	Don McKellar	Lynn Coady	January 22, 2017	N/A
5	"Hodophobia - Part 1"	Don McKellar	Bob Martin	January 29, 2017	N/A
6	"Hodophobia - Part 2"	Don McKellar	Bob Martin	January 29, 2017	N/A

== Reception ==
The show's premiere episode garnered low ratings, with 199,000 viewers watching. The rest of the season averaged around 250,000 viewers.
