= Matt Watts =

Canadian comedian

- Occupations: Comedian, actor, writer

Matt Watts is a Canadian comedian, actor and writer, best known for his work on Ken Finkleman's The Newsroom.

He was a writer, executive producer and the star of the Canadian television sitcom Michael, Tuesdays and Thursdays, which debuted on CBC Television in September 2011. Watts worked for CBC Radio One, writing and performing in the dramas Steve, The First, its sequel Steve, The Second and Canadia: 2056 and was co-creator and co-star of the web series The Writers' Block. He is credited as a writer and consulting producer on The Kids in the Hall 2022 eight-episode season on Amazon Prime.
