= Kayla Lorette =

Canadian actress

- Occupation: Actress
- Years active: 2000s–present

Kayla Lorette is a Canadian actress from Ladysmith, British Columbia. She is most noted for her performances in the film When the Storm Fades, for which she won the Vancouver Film Critics Circle Award for Best Supporting Actress in a Canadian Film in 2019, the television special The Second City Project, for which she was a Canadian Screen Award nominee for Best Performance in a Variety or Sketch Comedy Program or Series at the 4th Canadian Screen Awards in 2016, and the web series Space Riders: Division Earth, for which she was a Canadian Screen Award nominee for Best Lead Performance in a Web Program or Series at the 7th Canadian Screen Awards in 2019.

In 2023, she appeared as "Source Joan" in "Joan Is Awful", the opening episode of the sixth season of Black Mirror.

Her other credits have included the web series Everyone's Famous, Gary and His Demons and New Eden, the films Roller Town, She Stoops to Conquer, When the Storm Fades and Filth City, Emily in the US dub of Thomas & Friends: All Engines Go, and stage-based improvisational comedy as part of the duo The Sufferettes.

In 2020, she narrated a portion of the 8th Canadian Screen Awards along with her New Eden cocreator and costar Evany Rosen.
