= Almost Heroes (TV series) =

2011 Canadian comedy TV series

- Genre: Sitcom
- Created by: Ryan Belleville; Jason Belleville
- Starring: Paul Campbell; Ryan Belleville; Lauren Ash; Dave Hemstad; Athena Karkanis; Colin Mochrie; Meghan Heffern
- Country of origin: Canada
- Original language: English
- No. of seasons: 1
- No. of episodes: 8

Production
- Production location: Canada
- Camera setup: Single-camera
- Running time: 22 minutes
- Production company: Entertainment One

Original release
- Network: Showcase
- Release: June 2 – July 21, 2011

Almost Heroes is a Canadian comedy television series that premiered on June 2, 2011 on Showcase, and ran for one season (eight episodes) before being discontinued by Showcase at the beginning of the 2011 fall season. The series is centered on the lives of two brothers, Pete and Terry, played by Ryan Belleville and Paul Campbell, running their late father's comic book store, "The Silver Salmon". The series was created by brothers Jason Belleville and Ryan Belleville. The series also stars well-known Canadian comedian Colin Mochrie. Canadian comedian Fraser Young is one of the writers and story editors for the show.

== Plot ==
After the death of their father, brothers Terry and Peter inherit his suburban comic book store. The older brother Terry, returning from dropping out of business school at Harvard, decides to stay and help manage the comic book store after learning that the store is deep in debt.

== Cast and characters ==
=== Main cast ===
- Paul Campbell as Terry, a business student at Harvard who returns to his hometown to save his father's store
- Ryan Belleville as Pete, Terry's dimwitted but well-meaning younger brother
- Dave Hemstad as Dan, an owner of a neighboring sports store who bullies the brothers
- Lauren Ash as Bernie, a childhood friend of the brothers with a crush on Terry
- Meghan Heffern as Candi, Bernie's boss
- Athena Karkanis as Rayna, employee of the landlord
- Colin Mochrie as Boyd, a security guard at the strip mall

=== Recurring cast ===
- Josh Granovsky as Young Terry
- Alex Cardillo as Young Pete

== Episodes ==
No.	Title	Original release date
1	"Terry and Peter vs. Episode One"	June 2, 2011
Terry and Peter try to save their late father's comic book store.
2	"Terry and Peter vs. Wendell"	June 9, 2011
Peter buys an expensive comic book to sell to a collector, but Terry accidentally gives it away and are threatened by both a severe beating and the risk of losing their store.
3	"Terry and Peter vs. Girls"	June 16, 2011
Terry feels like he is striking out with the ladies while helping Peter through a date.
4	"Terry and Peter vs. a Living Wage"	June 23, 2011
Peter goes on strike and Terry must try to run the comic book store on his own.
5	"Terry and Peter vs. Their Hero"	June 30, 2011
Terry invites a childhood hero of Peter's to do a signing, but he turns out to be a raging alcoholic.
6	"Terry and Peter vs. the Law"	July 7, 2011
The publicity that Sassitude gets from a fake break-in inspires the brothers to fake a break-in of their own.
7	"Terry and Peter vs. Cupid"	July 14, 2011
Bernie starts dating the new delivery guy, and the brothers decide to meddle in her affairs.
8	"Terry and Peter vs. Season Finale"	July 21, 2011
Terry gets a job offer in Hong Kong and must decide whether to go or stay and fight alongside his brother against a nerdy bully.
