= Mark Little (Canadian comedian) =

Canadian actor and comedian (born 1983)

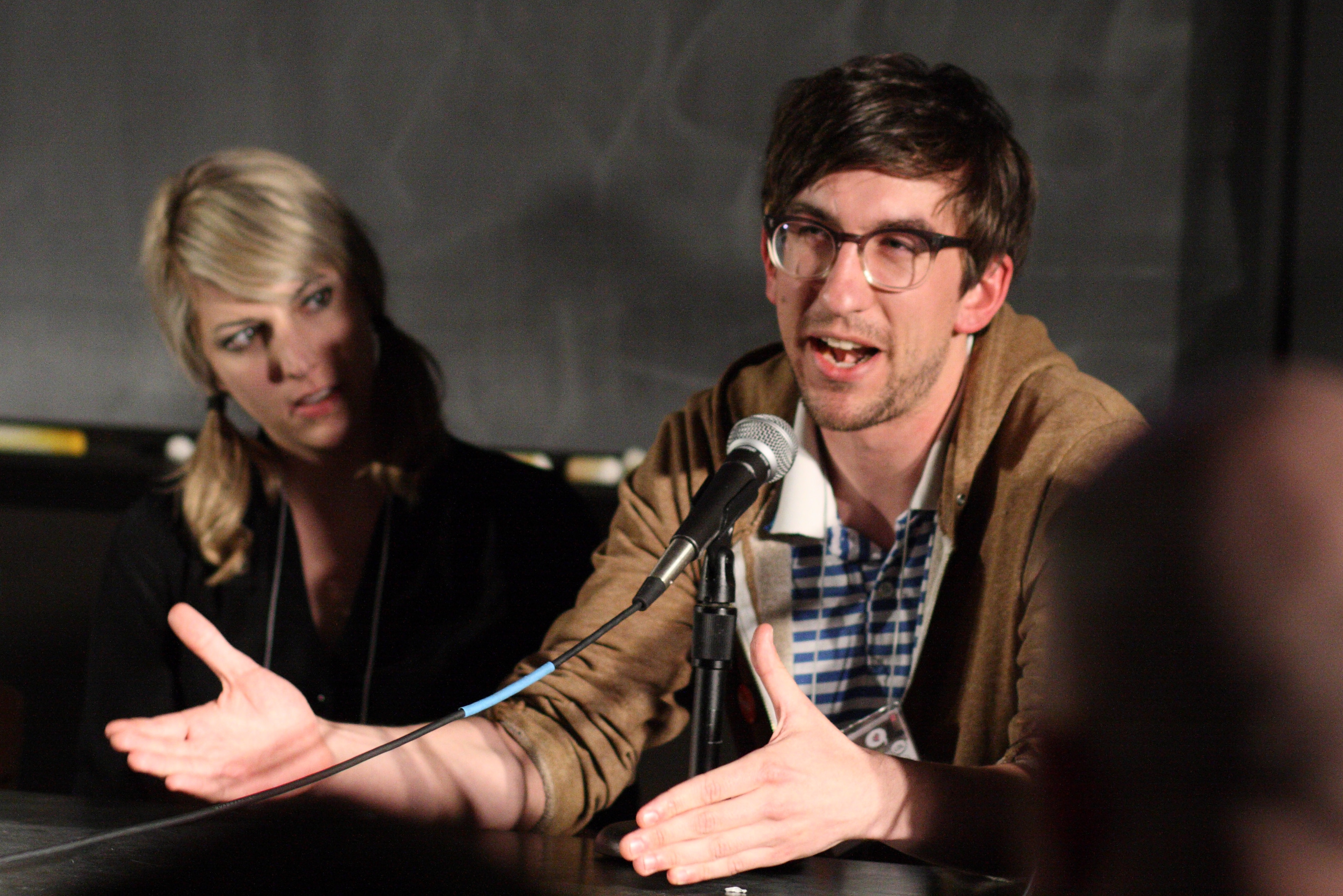
- Mark Little at ROFLCon II in 2010
- Born: Mark Thomas Little; October 21, 1982 (age 44)
- Notable work: Picnicface, Simon Hunt on Mr. D, CTV's Space Riders: Division Earth

Comedy career
- Years active: 2002-present
- Medium: Stand-up, television, theatre
- Genres: Observational comedy, improvisational comedy

Mark Thomas Little (born October 21, 1982) is a Canadian actor, comedian, writer, and producer. He is best known for his appearances on the CBC Television sitcom Mr. D, playing Simon Hunt, the Xavier Academy science teacher, and as the creator of the animated series Gary and His Demons.

== Personal ==
Little grew up in New Westminster, British Columbia, and lived in Vancouver, British Columbia and Halifax, Nova Scotia, before moving to Toronto, Ontario. He currently resides in New York City.

== Career ==
=== Comedy ===
Little is the former Humour Editor of Simon Fraser University's The Peak (newspaper). He has performed at Yuk Yuk's, the Halifax Comedy Festival, and CBC Radio's "So You Think You're Funny" series. He is a member of the Halifax-based sketch comedy group Picnicface. The troupe has produced several successful viral videos, is featured on Funny or Die, and stars in the films Roller Town and Room for Rent.

Little is also the co-star of CTV's Space Riders: Division Earth, a Power Rangers-themed web series that released its first season in 2014. The show won the 2015 Canadian Canadian Screen Award for best original webseries, and released a second season in 2017.

=== Television ===
Little portrayed Xavier Academy Science teacher Simon Hunt on the CBC Television sitcom Mr. D from 2012 until the show’s end in 2018, appearing in all 8 seasons. Little created, writes and voices the title role in the animated series Gary and His Demons.

=== Voice acting ===
Little's voice is featured in the YouTube video for an energy beverage called "Powerthirst" which holds over 32 million views. Little was subsequently hired to voice a drink ad inspired by the film Idiocracy called "Brawndo: The Thirst Mutilator". He is the voice of Dino in the Netflix series Cupcake & Dino: General Services and voiced Dave the mall guard in Transformers: BotBots.

=== Podcast ===
Starting in March 2023, Little launched a podcast titled “How Can We Help?” with fellow comedian Jackie Pirico. Occasionally joined by guest hosts, Little and Pirico respond with advice to listeners’ letters. Each episode ends with a celebrity advice segment, in which the hosts respond to “letters” from famous figures stuck in conundrums, such as a letter from a man named Jafar who aspired to become a sultan.

== Honours and awards ==
In 2019, Little won the Canadian Comedy Award for Best Performance in a Feature Film for Room for Rent. In 2008, Little was named Best Comedian by the readers of Halifax's The Coast, and appeared on the cover of the November 6, 2008, edition. Little also beat out 63 comics to win first place and $25,000 in Yuk Yuk's 2009 Great Canadian Laugh Off, a nationwide comedy competition.

== Praise ==
Mark Little has been called a "budding Canadian treasure" by Funny Business and described as "one of the best comic storytellers around" by NOW Magazine Toronto.
