= Die Alone =

- Official release poster
- Directed by: Lowell Dean
- Written by: Lowell Dean
- Produced by: Kevin DeWalt; Danielle Masters; Benjamin DeWalt
- Starring: Carrie-Anne Moss; Douglas Smith; Frank Grillo
- Cinematography: Mark Dobrescu
- Edited by: Tim Thurmeier
- Music by: Todd Bryanton
- Production company: Minds Eye Entertainment
- Distributed by: Filmoption
- Release dates: September 21, 2024 (Cinéfest); September 27, 2024 (Canada)
- Running time: 91 minutes
- Country: Canada
- Language: English

Die Alone is a 2024 Canadian horror thriller film written and directed by Lowell Dean. The film stars Carrie-Anne Moss, Douglas Smith, and Frank Grillo. It tells the story of a young man with amnesia who joins forces with a hardened survivalist during a zombie-like outbreak, as they set out to find his missing girlfriend. The film was released in theaters on September 27, 2024.

== Plot ==
In a post‑apocalyptic world devastated by a plant‑based virus that transforms humans into resilient, zombie-like hybrids, Ethan—a young man plagued by severe headaches and memory loss—clings to the hope of reuniting with his missing girlfriend, Emma. In the early days of the outbreak, Emma, an ER doctor, had fled with Ethan toward a remote cabin, but she soon disappears without a trace.

After a disorienting encounter in which armed strangers open fire on him, Ethan is rescued by Mae, a hardened survivalist who takes him to her secluded farm. Despite Mae's stern exterior, she cares for Ethan as he desperately searches for Emma. During his journey, Ethan ventures away from the relative safety of the farm, including a trip to the abandoned cabin where he finds only a frightened woman and her teenage son instead of Emma.

As fragments of his lost memories begin to return, Ethan gradually uncovers a harrowing truth: he is already infected by the virus, slowly morphing into one of the undead. In a shocking twist, it is revealed that the woman he has been seeking—Emma—is in fact Mae herself. For years, Mae has maintained Ethan's tenuous existence by feeding him human flesh from a steady stream of unwitting visitors, ensuring that he remains only marginally human despite his zombie-like state.

Confronted by this grim reality, Ethan attempts to end his suffering by shooting himself in the head; however, he soon discovers that, like all of the infected, he cannot die. Mae, overwhelmed by the cruelty of their fate, confesses that she "can't do this any more" and ultimately allows herself to be mauled by Ethan. In the film's ambiguous final moments, the two rise from the wreckage holding hands and walk into the sunset, leaving their ultimate destiny unresolved.

== Cast ==
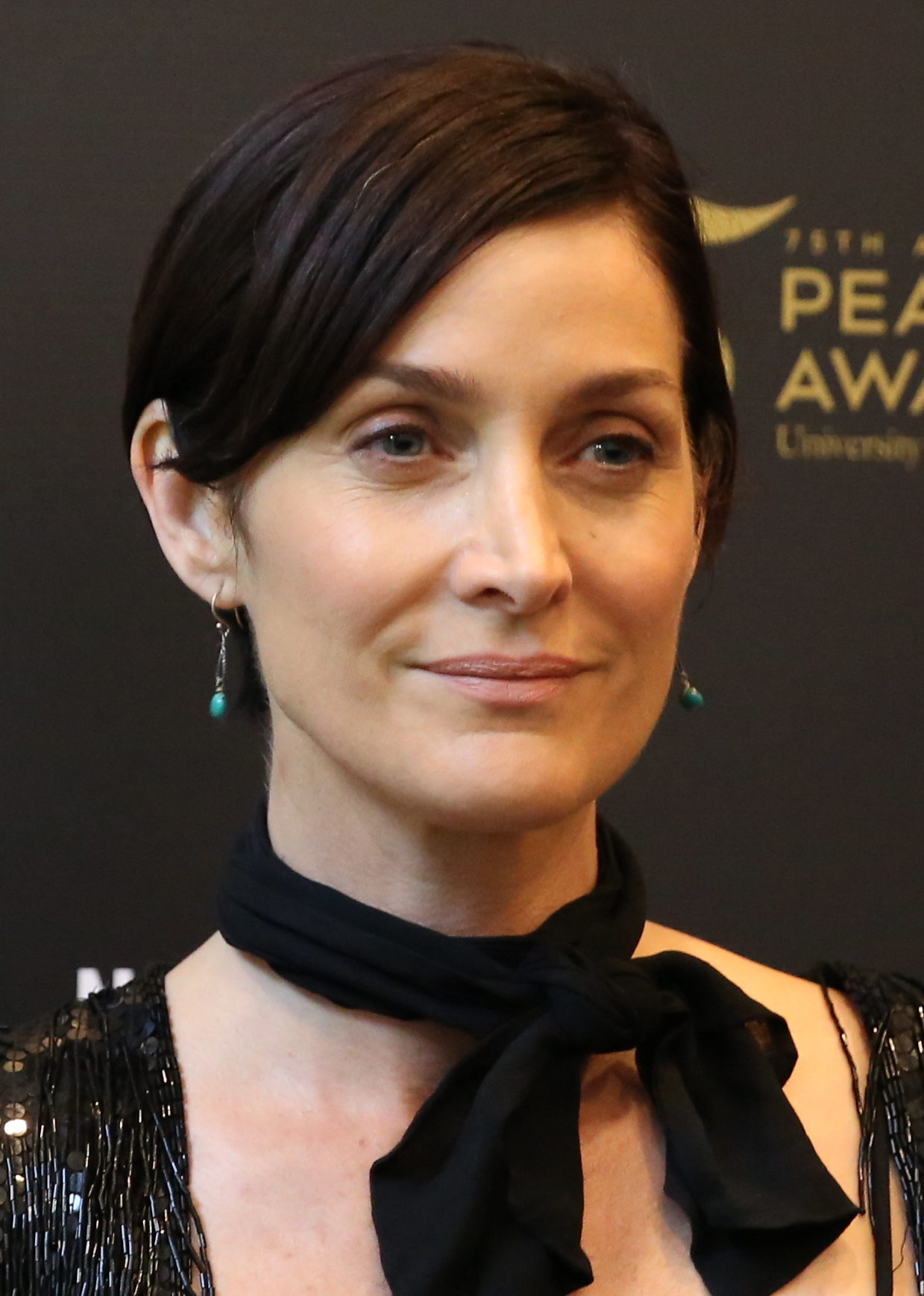
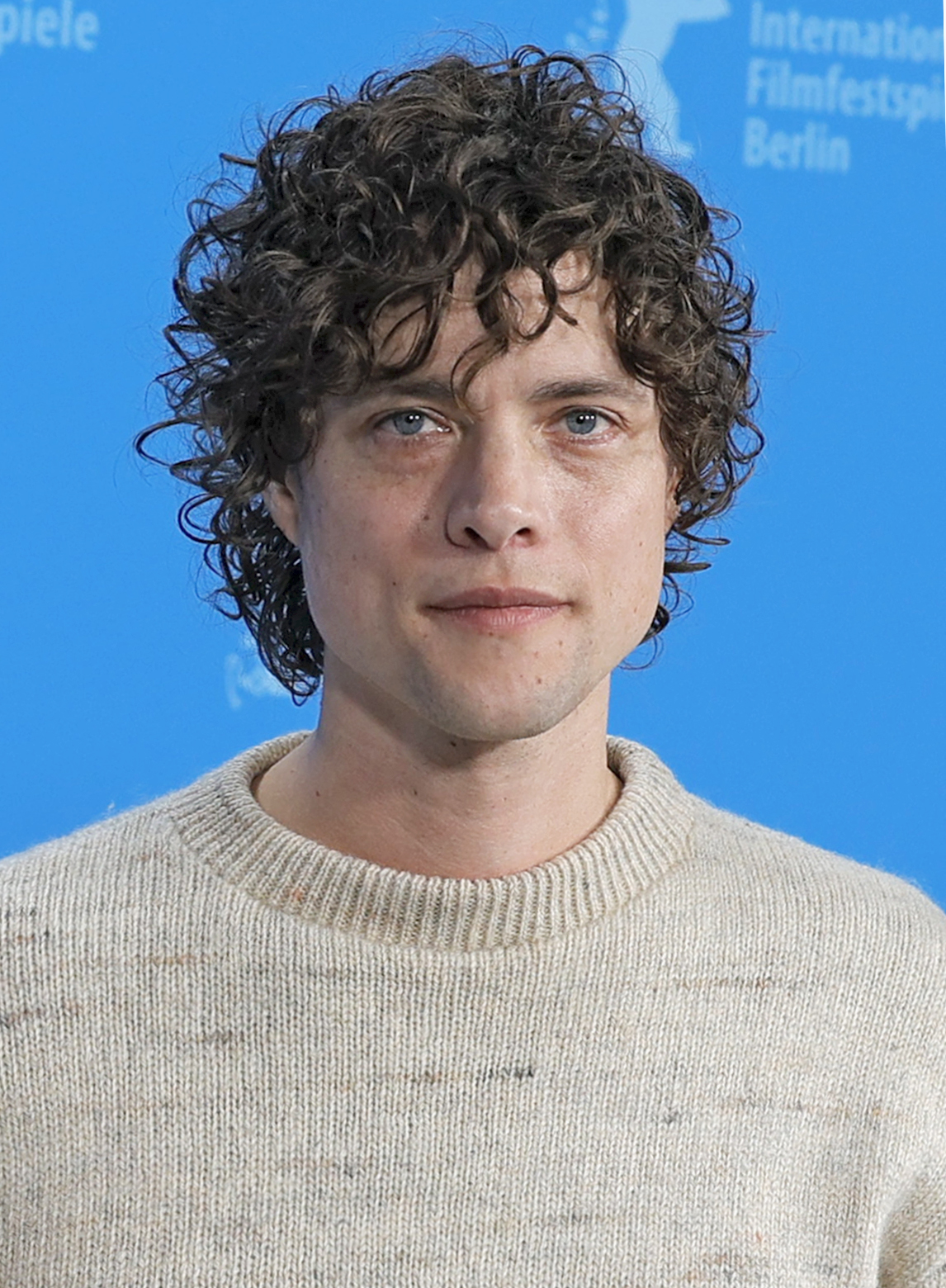
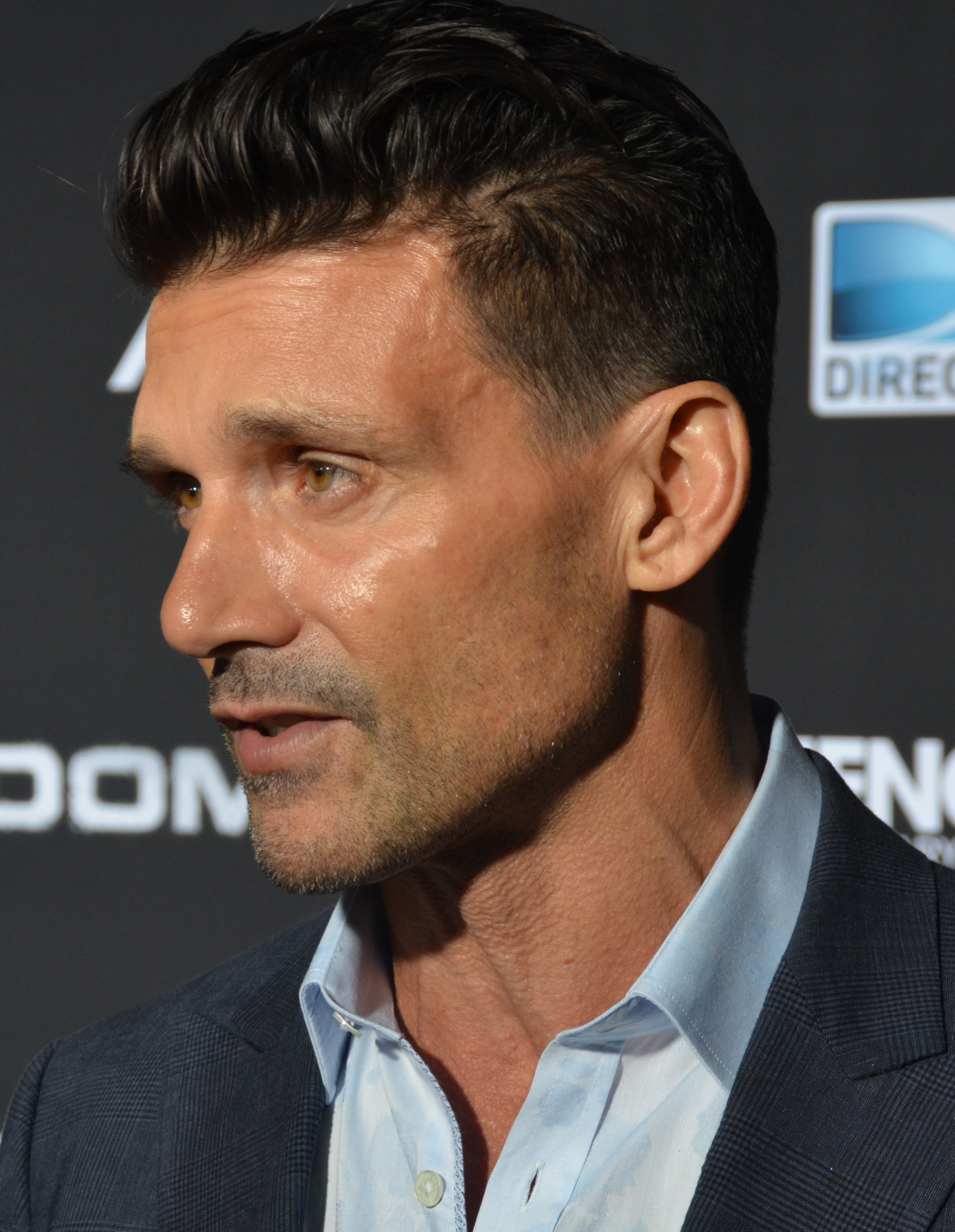
- Main characters: (left to right) Carrie-Anne Moss, Douglas Smith and Frank Grillo
- Carrie-Anne Moss as Mae
- Douglas Smith as Ethan
- Frank Grillo as Kai
- Kimberly-Sue Murray as Emma
- Steven Roy as The Wolf
- Harlan Blayne Kytwayhat as The Fox
- Jonathan Cherry as Tom
- Amy Matysio as Jolene
- Sari Mercer as Sara
- Leo Fafard as Hunter
- Ryland Alexander as Monstrous Man
- Laura Abramsen as Jawless Woman
- Jason Truong as Hunter's Driver
- Palmer Tastad as Caroline
- George Grassick as Ash Man
- Greyson Dubois as Sam

== Production ==
Lowell Dean wrote the script for Die Alone before the release of WolfCop in 2014, but production on the film didn't take place for almost a decade.

In May 2023, it was announced that Moss, Smith, and Grillo were cast in the film.

Principal photography for Die Alone began in June 2023, the primary filming took place on location in Regina, Saskatchewan. In September of that same year, it was announced that production had concluded.

== Release ==
The film premiered at the 2024 Cinéfest Sudbury International Film Festival, and in theatres on September 27, 2024.

== Reception ==
=== Critical reception ===
On the review aggregator website Rotten Tomatoes, 80% of 15 critics' reviews are positive.

Shawn Van Horn of Collider awarded the film seven stars, stating: "While Die Alone is set in the aftermath of a world ravaged by the rise of the undead, it defies the conventions of typical genre fare. The zombie design is particularly impactful, featuring creatures so twisted and deformed that they could rival those in Resident Evil or The Last of Us. Impressively, the film achieves this through high-quality practical effects, without a trace of CGI."

Film critic Mel Valentin of Screen Anarchy commented: "While Die Alone experiences a slow midsection, it regains momentum with the arrival of home invaders and a religious family led by Kai (Frank Grillo). The film explores the mystery of Ethan's struggle between self-destruction and survival, offering emotionally satisfying answers. However, Valentin also pointed out the film's budget constraints, which limit the depiction of the post-apocalyptic world and the plant-human hybrid undead to only a few brief scenes."
