= Anne Goursaud =

French film editor and director (b. 1943)

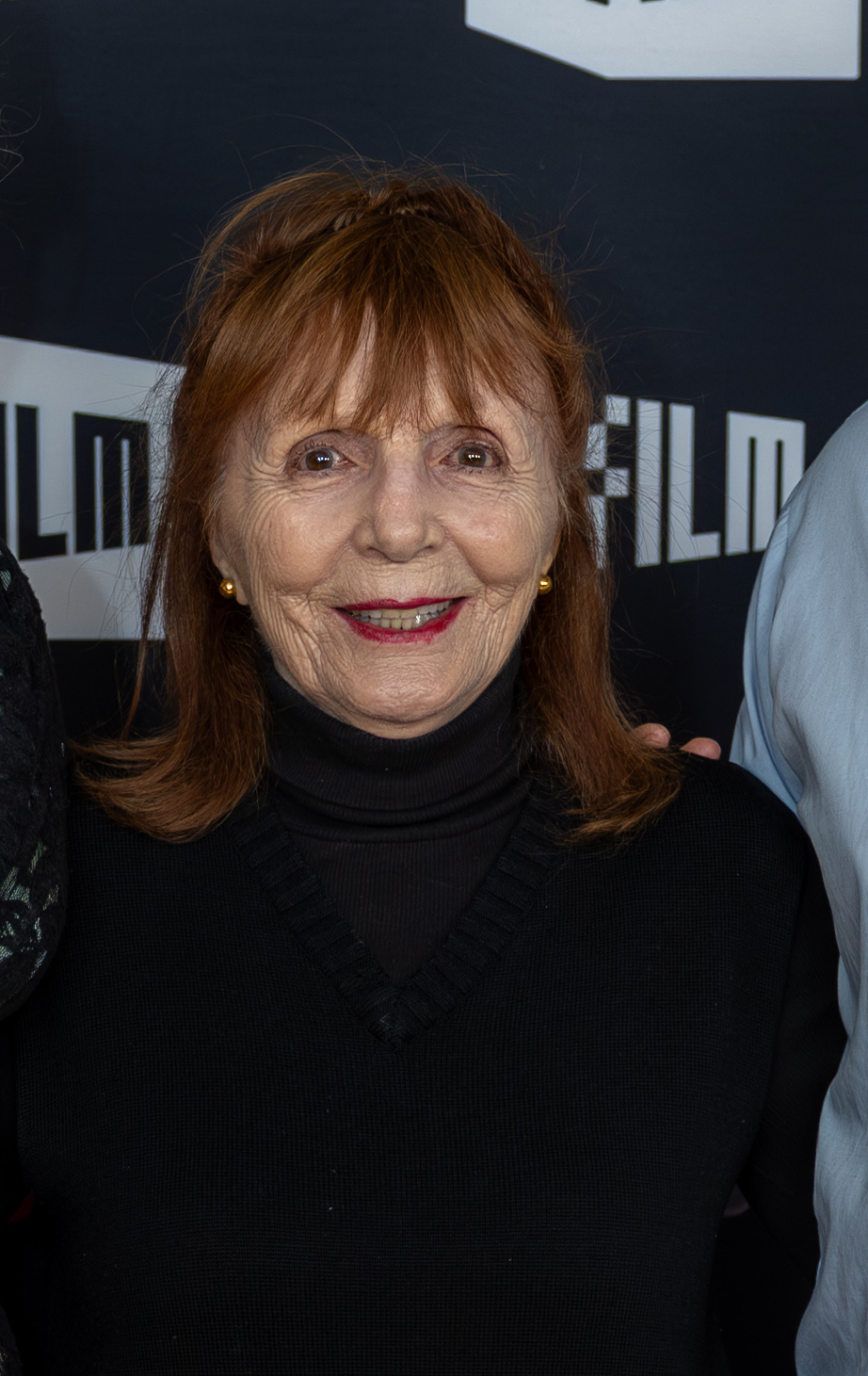
- Goursaud at SFFILM in 2026
- Born: December 1943 (age 82); France
- Education: Sorbonne University; Columbia University (1973, MFA)
- Occupations: Film editor, film director

Anne Goursaud (born December 1943) is a French film editor and director, best known for her work with director Francis Ford Coppola.

== Life and career ==
Goursaud studied art history at the Sorbonne University and the Columbia University School of the Arts, graduating with an MFA from the latter in 1973.

She is a member of the Academy of Motion Picture Arts and Sciences' Board of Governors, and was previously a senior lecturer at the AFI Conservatory.

== Filmography ==
=== Film ===
==== Director ====
Year	Title	Notes
1995	Embrace of the Vampire	
1996	Poison Ivy II: Lily	
1997	Love in Paris	
2006	The Truth and Nothing But the Truth	Short
2016	A Classy Broad	Documentary

==== Editor ====
Year	Title	Director	Notes
1978	A Different Story	Paul Aaron	with Lynn McCallon
1979	A Force of One	Paul Aaron	with Bert Lovitt
1981	The Night the Lights Went Out in Georgia	Ronald F. Maxwell	
1982	One from the Heart	Francis Ford Coppola	with Rudi Fehr and Randy Roberts
1983	The Outsiders	Francis Ford Coppola	
1984	American Dreamer	Rick Rosenthal	
1986	Just Between Friends	Allan Burns	
1986	Crimes of the Heart	Bruce Beresford	
1987	Ironweed	Héctor Babenco	
1989	Her Alibi	Bruce Beresford	
1990	The Two Jakes	Jack Nicholson	
1992	Bram Stoker's Dracula	Francis Ford Coppola	with Nicholas C. Smith and Glen Scantlebury
1993	Wide Sargasso Sea	John Duigan	with Jimmy Sandoval
1999	Away with Words	Christopher Doyle	with Sozo Morisaki
2000	Lost Souls	Janusz Kamiński	with Andrew Mondshein
2003	Quattro Noza	Joey Curtis	with Curtis and Jim Helton
2006	Who Never Lived	Andrzej Seweryn	with Wojciech Mrówczynski
2006	Idlewild	Bryan Barber	
2007	Expired	Cecilia Miniucchi	with Fritz Feick
2008	Dark Streets	Rachel Samuels	with Michael J. Duthie
2008	Days of Wrath	Celia Fox	with Michael Schultz
2018	The Maestro	Adam Cushman	with Cushman
2022	Life Upside Down	Cecilia Miniucchi	
2025	Arthur Elgort: Models & Muses	Warren Elgort	

=== Television ===
==== Director ====
Year	Title	Notes
1993	Red Shoe Diaries	S2.E1 ("Midnight Bells")

==== Editor ====
Year	Title	Director	Notes
1979	Freedom Road	Ján Kadár	TV movie
2002	Master Spy: The Robert Hanssen Story	Lawrence Schiller	TV movie
