= Super grid (disambiguation) =

Super grid usually refers to a wide area electricity network connecting large geographic areas into a single unified system.

Super grid may also refer to:

- Supergrid, a single HVDC transmission line
- SuperGrid, the transmission system unifying Great Britain's National Grid (UK)
- Super grid road system built in Saskatchewan in the mid-twentieth century
- SuperGrid (film), 2018 Canadian post-apocalyptic road movie directed by Lowell Dean
