= SuperGrid (film) =

- Theatrical release poster
- Directed by: Lowell Dean
- Written by: T.R. McCauley; Justin Ludwig
- Produced by: Hugh Patterson; Trinni Franke; Echolands Creative Group
- Starring: Leo Fafard; Marshall Williams; Natalie Krill; Jonathan Cherry
- Cinematography: Michael Jari Davidson
- Edited by: Tim Thurmeier
- Distributed by: Ravenbanner
- Release date: September 21, 2018 (Calgary)
- Country: Canada
- Language: English

SuperGrid is a 2018 Canadian post-apocalyptic road film directed by Lowell Dean, who previously directed horror-comedies WolfCop and Another WolfCop. The film stars Leo Fafard, Marshall Williams, Natalie Krill, Jonathan Cherry, Amy Matysio and Jay Reso.

The film premiered at the 2018 Calgary International Film Festival.

== Plot ==
In a future where a plague has infected much of the population, two brothers are tasked with retrieving a mysterious package by traveling to Canada, which mining conglomerates have turned into a wasteland. Two brothers must travel the same road that claimed their sister's life in their quest to deliver mysterious cargo that they received to its proper destination. En route they must contend with road pirates, rebel gangs, and each other.

== Cast ==
- Leo Fafard as Jesse
- Marshall Williams as Deke
- Natalie Krill as North
- Jonathan Cherry as Lazlo
- Amy Matysio as Spanner
- Jay Reso as Kurtis
- Tinsel Korey as Eagle
- Sheldon Bergstrom as Brezhnev

== Production ==
"To produce a movie with local crew and a strong cast in my hometown is a huge win. Remaining local is a must for SuperGrid. With Lowell at the helm, we are pumped to show the world an epic prairie apocalyptic road movie, that is produced right here in Regina".

— Producer Hugh Patterson

SuperGrid was filmed in the Canadian province of Saskatchewan during the summer of 2017, mainly in Regina. Filming also took place in Grand Coulee, Lumsden Beach, Lebret and the former Sears Warehouse. Filming also occurred at the acreage of Jackie Galenzoski near Southey, Saskatchewan.

== Reception ==
On review aggregator Rotten Tomatoes, the film has an approval rating of 71% based on reviews from seven critics, with an average rating of 6.4/10.
