= Lowell Dean =

Canadian filmmaker (born 1978/79)

- Born: 1978 or 1979 (age 46–47); Canada
- Occupation: film director

Lowell Dean is a Canadian filmmaker.

He has directed six feature films: the zombie thriller 13 Eerie (2013), the horror comedy WolfCop (2014), the sequel Another WolfCop (2017), the post-apocalypse action film SuperGrid (2018), the wrestling-horror Dark Match (2024) and the post-apocalyptic love story Die Alone (2024). Lowell also wrote WolfCop, Another WolfCop, Dark Match and Die Alone. His first film as a writer and director, WolfCop, was released June 2014 in Canadian Cineplex theatres. In an Interview with Bloody Disgusting in March 2015, Dean revealed he was writing the sequel to WolfCop, which would again star Leo Fafard in the lead. Lowell's film, Die Alone, had its international festival debut at the Sitges Film Festival, where it won the Midnight X-treme audience choice award. Die Alone was released in 2024.

Dean has also served as a director on several television projects include the children's series Hi Opie! produced by The Jim Henson Company, and the Canadian reality series Dust Up produced by Paperny Entertainment.
