= Ayisha Issa =

Canadian actress

- Born: 18 March 1984 (age 41); Montreal, Quebec, Canada
- Occupation(s): Actress, martial arts practitioner

Ayisha Issa (born 18 March 1984) is a Canadian actress and martial arts practitioner. She has played a number of roles in both English- and French-language television series and films, such as Dark Matter, Unité 9, and Brick Mansions. She is a practitioner of Brazilian jiu-jitsu who won at the International Brazilian Jiu-Jitsu Federation World Championships twice, once in 2010 as a white belt, and again in 2014 as a blue belt; she currently holds the rank of brown belt and previously owned a dojo in Toronto. She also did voice acting for Ubisoft's Far Cry Primal and The Dark Pictures Anthology: Man of Medan, which was developed by Supermassive Games and published by Bandai Namco Entertainment, receiving a BAFTA Award for Performer in a Supporting Role nomination.

In 2022, she won the Canadian Screen Award for Best Supporting Actor in a Drama Series at the 10th Canadian Screen Awards, for her regular role as Dr. June Curtis in Transplant.

== Biography ==
Issa was born and raised in Montreal, Quebec, growing up as an Anglophone on Montreal's West Island. She had a troubled childhood, and at one point lived in a group home. When she was 15, she was a client with the Batshaw Youth and Family Centres, a local nonprofit assisting troubled youth. As a teenager, she suffered from depression, anxiety, and eating disorders, but despite this, she began working toward a modeling career, which proved to be unsuccessful, something she attributed to her athletic build. In her twenties, she worked as the assistant front-desk manager at a Montreal hotel before being fired. Looking for a new career, she shifted her focus toward athletics, and after a brief time in kickboxing, began to practice Brazilian jiu-jitsu. By 2010, she had won the heavyweight adult female white belt (novice) category at the International Brazilian Jiu-Jitsu Federation World Championships. Around this time, she landed a breakthrough role in a major picture, Immortals (2011), through old modeling connections.

Her role in Immortals was followed immediately with a role in The Bait (L'Appât), a French-language buddy cop action comedy film where she plays a "kind of Ninja assassin" who pursues the main characters. Her television debut, in 2011, was a small role on the French-language series 30 vies. This was followed by a number of minor roles in English-language films like Warm Bodies and Betty and Coretta (both 2013), as well as Brick Mansions (2014), which was Paul Walker's penultimate film. In 2014 she landed a major role in the French-language television series Unité 9 (fr), broadcast on Ici Radio-Canada Télé. Sometimes compared to Orange Is the New Black, the series is also set in a women's prison. Issa played Bouba, a "mean piece of work who makes life a living hell for the other female prisoners." This role raised her profile considerably in Montréal and Québec.

She won again at the 2014 International Brazilian Jiu-Jitsu Federation World Championships, this time competing as a heavyweight blue belt. She subsequently decided to withdraw from competition to focus on her acting career.

In the latter half of the 2010s, she made a number of other appearances on English-language Canadian-produced television series such as 12 Monkeys on Syfy in 2016, Dark Matter on Syfy and Space in 2017, and in 2019, Workin' Moms on CBC, Shadowhunters on ABC, and The Expanse on Amazon Prime Video. She also played roles in films such as The Hummingbird Project (2018) and Polar (2019). Issa also began venturing into videogame work, starting with voice acting for Ubisoft's Far Cry Primal (2016), which involved learning to speak lines in the developers' reconstructed version of Proto-Indo-European, a hypothesized ancestor of the Indo-European languages. This was followed by motion-capture work for Assassin's Creed: Odyssey (2018), where she supplied the movements for many of the female characters. Rounding out the decade, she played the role of Fliss, a boat captain, in the interactive drama survival horror videogame The Dark Pictures Anthology: Man of Medan (2019), which was developed by Supermassive Games and published by Bandai Namco Entertainment.

Her most recent work is a role in the CTV series Transplant, which is a medical drama set in Toronto. She was a Canadian Screen Award nominee for Best Supporting Actress in a Drama Program or Series at the 10th Canadian Screen Awards in 2022.

She currently has a brown belt in Brazilian jiu-jitsu and owns a dojo named 4Points in Toronto.

== Filmography ==
=== Film ===
| Year | Title | Role | Notes |
|---|---|---|---|
| 2006 | Cheech | One of Cheech's daughters | |
| 2010 | The Bait (L'Appât) | Van Cleef | |
| 2011 | Who Is Simon Miller? | — | TV film; stunt double: Jasmine |
| 2011 | Immortals | High Priestess #4 | |
| 2013 | Warm Bodies | Athletic Woman | |
| 2013 | Betty and Coretta | Student with Question | TV film |
| 2014 | Brick Mansions | Rayzah | |
| 2017 | Eye on Juliet | Naomi | |
| 2018 | The Hummingbird Project | Ophelia Troller | |
| 2018 | All the Things | — | Short film; special thanks |
| 2019 | Polar | Jazmin | |
| 2019 | Dark Phoenix | — | Stunts |
| 2024 | Dark Match | Miss Behave | |

=== Television ===
| Year | Title | Role | Notes |
|---|---|---|---|
| 2011 | 30 vies | Clara | 3 episodes |
| 2013–17 | Unité 9 (fr) | Bouba | 54 episodes |
| 2016 | 12 Monkeys | Emissary | 6 episodes |
| 2017 | Dark Matter | Solara Shockley | 4 episodes |
| 2019 | Workin' Moms | Wendy | 2 episodes |
| 2019 | Shadowhunters | Annaliese | Episode: "To the Night Children" |
| 2019 | The Expanse | Matar Kubileya Leader | Episode: "Retrograde" |
| 2020 | Transplant | Dr. June Curtis | Series regular |

=== Video games ===
| Year | Title | Role | Notes |
|---|---|---|---|
| 2016 | Far Cry Primal | Jayma | Voice |
| 2018 | Assassin's Creed: Odyssey | — | Stunts |
| 2019 | The Dark Pictures: Man of Medan | Fliss | Voice |
