= Jonathan Cherry =

Canadian actor

- Born: December 3, 1978 (age 47); Montreal, Quebec, Canada
- Occupation: Actor
- Years active: 2000–present

Jonathan Cherry (born December 3, 1978) is a Canadian actor. He made his on-screen debut with a supporting role in the Fox television film Till Dad Do Us Part (2001). After a supporting role in the horror film They (2002), Cherry received mainstream attention for his lead role in the Uwe Boll-directed action horror film House of the Dead (2003) and his supporting role in the supernatural horror film Final Destination 2 (2003).

Cherry starred in multiple direct-to-video films during the mid-to-late 2000s. In the 2010s, he most notably had a supporting role as Marco Belchior in the sports films Goon (2011) and Goon: Last of the Enforcers (2017), and a starring role as Willie Higgins in the superhero horror films WolfCop (2014) and Another WolfCop (2017). Cherry also starred in the films The Maestro (2018) and SuperGrid (2018), and had a supporting role in the romantic comedy film The F Word (2013).

In the 2020s, Cherry most notably starred in the psychological drama film The Novice (2021). He also starred in the horror films Dark Match (2024) and Die Alone (2024).

== Career ==
In 2000, Cherry appeared in a Sprite commercial made to promote the film How the Grinch Stole Christmas.

Cherry's most notable role came as Rory in the supernatural horror film Final Destination 2 (2003). Describing his character, Cherry characterized Rory as "a very opposite of me whose arc goes from, 'I don't really care at all', to 'Oh my God, this is really happening!'" During the same year, Cherry had the lead role of Rudy in the Uwe Boll-directed horror film House of the Dead, which was based on the video game series The House of the Dead. The film is considered one of the worst video game films of all time.

In 2011, Cherry had a supporting role in the sports comedy film Goon. In 2013, he had a supporting role in the romantic comedy film The F Word. Cherry starred in the superhero horror film WolfCop (2014), and he reprised his role in the sequel, Another WolfCop (2017). Cherry reprised his Goon role in the film's sequel, Last of the Enforcers (2017). During 2019, he took a break from acting.

In 2021, Cherry starred in the drama film The Novice, which won three awards at the Tribeca Film Festival. In December 2022, he was cast in the horror film Dark Match, which premiered in July 2024.

== Filmography ==
=== Film ===
Year	Title	Role	Notes
2002	They	Darren	
2002	Long Shot	Vernon	
2003	Final Destination 2	Rory Peters	
2003	House of the Dead	Rudolph "Rudy" Curien	
2004	Love on the Side	Chuck Stuckley	
2005	America 101	Not-so-homeless student	
2005	The White Dog Sacrifice	Jason	
2008	Animal 2	Paramedic 2	
2008	The Wreck	Chuck	
2009	Bald	Max Bishop	
2011	Goon	Marco Belchior	
2013	The F Word	Josh	
2013	Three Night Stand	Doug	
2014	WolfCop	Willie Higgins	
2017	Goon: Last of the Enforcers	Marco Belchior	
2017	Another WolfCop	Willie Higgins	
2018	The Maestro	Ray	
2018	Kin	Police Clerk	
2018	SuperGrid	Lazlo	
2021	The Novice	Coach Pete	
2024	Dark Match	Rusty	
2024	All the Lost Ones	Vice	
2024	Die Alone	Tom	
2026	The Stunt Driver	Ricky	

=== Television ===
Year	Title	Role	Notes
2001	Till Dad Do Us Part	Dennis Quilantip	Television film
2001	The Outer Limits	Andy Wilson	Episode: "The Tipping Point"
2002	My Guide to Becoming a Rock Star	Vance	Episode: "One Night Only"
2003	Black Sash	Mark	Episode: "Snap Shots"
2005	Marker	Spumoni Agnellos	Television film
2005	Christmas in Boston	Matt	Television film
2006	CSI: NY	James Golden	Episode: "Stuck on You"
2006	CSI: Miami	Gavin LaPorte	Episode: "Darkroom"
2011	Tagged	Tom Reich	Television film
2013	Love is Dead	Phil	Television film
2014	Rookie Blue	Lee Baker	Episode: "Heart Breakers, Money Makers"
2014–2015	Strange LA	Matthew MicConaughey	2 episodes
2017	Supernatural	Dave Mather	Episode: "Tombstone"
2019	Tokens	Director No. 1	Web series; 3 episodes
2022	Love for Starters	Dax	Television film

== Awards and nominations ==
Year	Award	Category	Nominated work	Result
2005	Leo Awards	Feature Length Drama – Best Lead Performance by a Male	Marker	Nominated
2019	Asia Web Awards	Best Ensemble Cast in a Comedy	Tokens	Nominated
2020	Seattle International Film Festival	Best Ensemble in a Feature Film	The Maestro	Nominated
