= The Novice (film) =

2021 film by Lauren Hadaway

- Theatrical release poster
- Directed by: Lauren Hadaway
- Written by: Lauren Hadaway
- Produced by: Ryan Hawkins; Zack Zucker; Steven Sims; Kari Hollend
- Starring: Isabelle Fuhrman; Amy Forsyth; Dilone; Charlotte Ubben; Jonathan Cherry; Kate Drummond
- Cinematography: Todd Martin
- Edited by: Nathan Nugent; Lauren Hadaway
- Music by: Alex Weston
- Production companies: Picture Movers; H2L Media Group; ZNZ Productions; RBF Productions
- Distributed by: IFC Films
- Release dates: June 13, 2021 (Tribeca); December 17, 2021 (United States)
- Running time: 97 minutes
- Country: United States
- Language: English
- Box office: $24,322

The Novice is a 2021 American psychological sports drama film written and directed by Lauren Hadaway in her feature directorial debut. Starring Isabelle Fuhrman, Amy Forsyth, Dilone, Charlotte Ubben, Jonathan Cherry, and Kate Drummond, the film follows an obsessive university freshman who joins the rowing team.

The Novice had its world premiere at the Tribeca Film Festival on June 13, 2021, where Fuhrman won the Best Actress award. The film was theatrically released in the United States on December 17, 2021, to widespread acclaim, with particular praise for Hadaway's direction. It earned five nominations at the 37th Independent Spirit Awards, including Best Film and Best Director for Hadaway. The film was shot at Trent University in Ontario, Canada.

== Plot ==
After a physics class in which she takes the same exam multiple times over, obsessively competitive college freshman Alex Dall sets out to join the Wellington College Novice Rowing Program. Shortly after the first training session, her thoughts become occupied with the sport - in particular with the consistent form practiced while rowing.

Jamie Brill, another freshman taking up rowing as a means to attain a much needed athletic scholarship, is quickly labeled as the "best novice" on the team to the chagrin of Alex, further fueling the latter's obsessive drive. Over time, Alex improves her rowing times to the detriment of her academic performance, and she and Jamie are moved into the varsity team. While Jamie quickly adapts to the new environment, Alex fails to fit in both socially and athletically, and accidentally knocks herself out during a major race.

Moved back to the novice team, Alex loses her already tenuous friendship with Jamie, and during the first joint novice/varsity practice passes out while exercising and urinates herself. After Erin, a varsity rower and trainer, outlines the criteria to officially make varsity but expresses doubt in Alex due to her small stature, Alex begins vigorously practicing alone, but is interrupted by Coach Pete who has been taking increasing notice of her potentially self-harmful level of commitment. Pete initially attempts to dissuade Alex from working so hard, but eventually offers to assist her in using a scull to practice alone during winter break.

Alex steadily improves as a rower by practicing over fall break, and begins a romance with Dani, her former teaching assistant. Alex and Jamie are eager to try out for the "1V boat" which the best members of the team row on, but are denied the opportunity by Coaches Pete and Edwards. Meanwhile, Alex's health deteriorates, with a wound on her palm frequently bleeding.

In the spring, Alex and Jamie race to determine who will take the spot of a 1V Rower who has left the team due to a broken collarbone. Alex loses, sensing that the team was assisting the more popular Jamie by sandbagging while rowing on Alex's boat. Dejected, Alex cuts herself near her ribs, while an infection from the wound on her palm begins to spread up her arm. Dani breaks up with Alex due to her increasingly destructive behavior. Alex accuses Jamie of cheating to win the spot. Jamie, who had previously believed that Alex was seeking the same scholarship as herself, angrily retorts that Alex is yet another "silver spoon student".

In the final week of the season, the team hosts a casual, friendly competition, during which Alex declares her intent to break Highsmith's team record. The girls row in individual boats. Alex collides her boat into Highsmith's, who is thrown into the water. Due to a severe storm, the rest of the team begins to row back to shore, but Alex persists despite their warnings. Alex runs into Jamie's boat as well and is thrown into the water, but climbs back on and continues rowing into the storm.

Alex finishes the race and looks at her watch. She returns to the training building to the silent shock of her team members and coaches. She erases her name from the team chalkboard, undresses and leaves the team jersey and walks away. The last sight of Alex leaves the happy ending or not up to the viewer.

== Cast ==
- Isabelle Fuhrman as Alex Dall
- Amy Forsyth as Jamie Brill
- Dilone as Dani
- Jonathan Cherry as Coach Pete
- Kate Drummond as Coach Edwards
- Jeni Ross as Winona
- Eve Kanyo as Groundman
- Nikki Duval as Try-Hard
- Charlotte Ubben as Erin
- Sage Irvine as Janssen
- Chantelle Bishop as Highsmith

== Release ==
The film premiered at the Tribeca Film Festival on June 13, 2021. There, it won the Best U.S. Narrative Feature Film prize.

In August 2021, it was announced that IFC Films acquired North American distribution rights to the film, which was released in select theaters and on demand and digital platforms on December 17, 2021.

== Reception ==
=== Box office ===
In its opening weekend, the film earned $12,301 from 36 theaters for a per screen average of $341. In its second weekend, it made $1,034 from only nine theaters. The film dropped to six theaters in its third weekend and earned $1,222.

=== Critical response ===
The film has a 95% rating on Rotten Tomatoes based on 60 reviews, with an average rating of 7.80/10. The site's critical consensus reads: "A remarkable first feature for writer-director Lauren Hadaway, The Novice paints a thrilling -- and disturbing -- portrait of obsession." On Metacritic, the film has a weighted average score of 87 out of 100, based on 14 reviews, indicating "universal acclaim".

Jourdain Searles of The Hollywood Reporter gave the film a positive review and wrote, "A film this raw made with such a steady, assured hand only comes along once in a while. We should take notice." Kate Erbland of IndieWire graded the film a B+ and wrote, "The film’s tense score, from composer Alex Weston, adds to the sense that The Novice is more a horror film than anything else, with a series of intriguing, vintage song choices alternately cutting and upping that tension..." Hoi-Tran Bui of Slash Film rated it an 8 out of 10 and wrote, "It's an impressive feat of incisively dark tone, even if the plot and characters are little more than shadows."

Alex Saveliev of Film Threat also rated the film an 8 out of 10 and wrote, "Hadaway may be a novice at helming feature-length films, but that doesn’t make her any less of a visionary."

=== Accolades ===
Association	Date of ceremony	Category	Recipients	Result	Ref(s).
Tribeca Film Festival	June 17, 2021	Best U.S. Narrative Feature	The Novice	Won	
Tribeca Film Festival	June 17, 2021	Best Actress in a U.S. Narrative Feature Film	Isabelle Fuhrman	Won	
Tribeca Film Festival	June 17, 2021	Best Cinematography in a U.S. Narrative Feature Film	Todd Martin	Won	
Independent Spirit Awards	March 6, 2022	Best Film	Ryan Hawkins, Kari Hollend, Steven Sims and Zack Zucker	Nominated	
Independent Spirit Awards	March 6, 2022	Best Director	Lauren Hadaway	Nominated	
Independent Spirit Awards	March 6, 2022	Best Female Lead	Isabelle Fuhrman	Nominated	
Independent Spirit Awards	March 6, 2022	Best Supporting Female	Amy Forsyth	Nominated	
Independent Spirit Awards	March 6, 2022	Best Editing	Lauren Hadaway and Nathan Nugent	Nominated	
