= Dilone =

American model (born 1994)

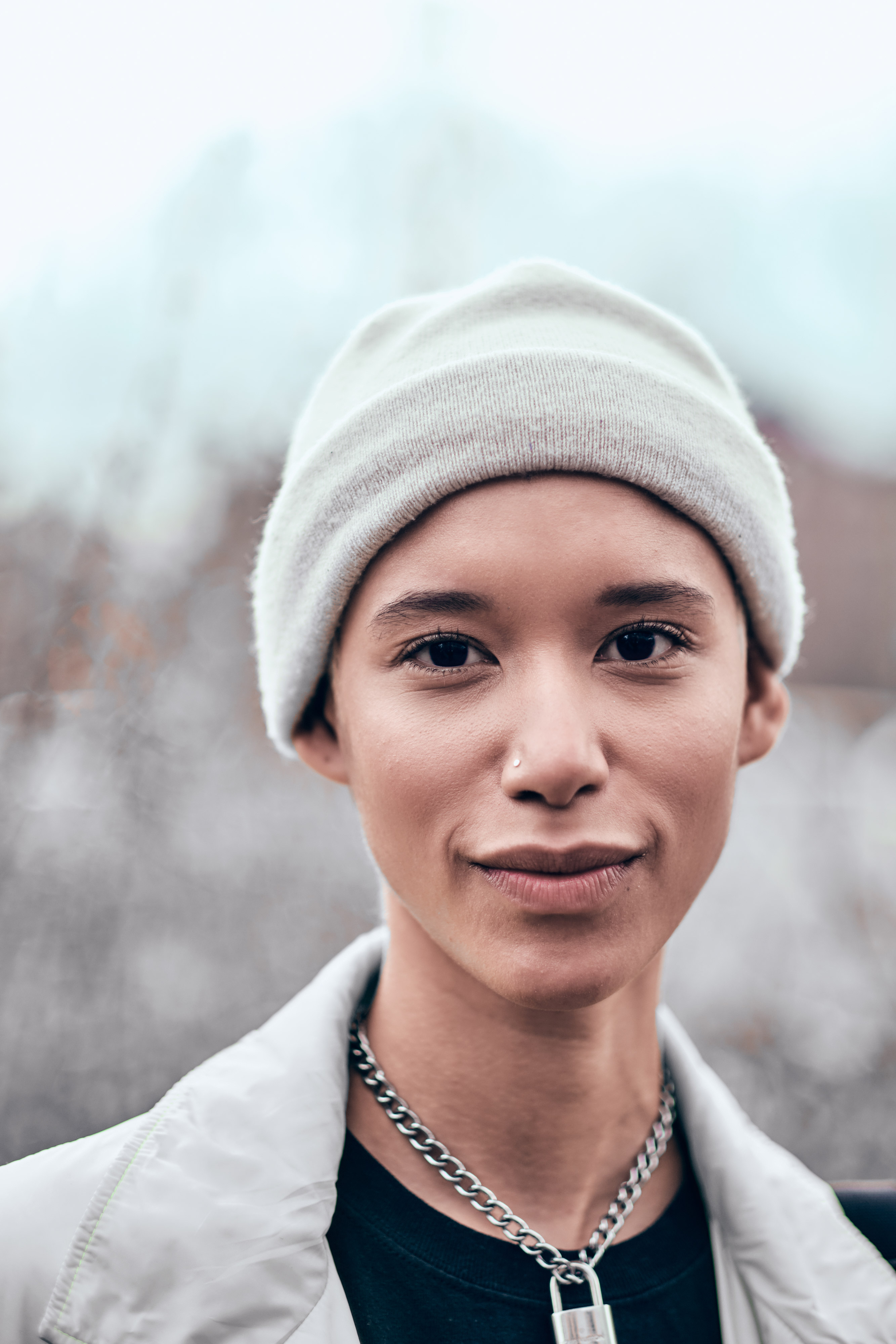
- Dilone in 2019
- Born: Janice Altagracia Dilone; May 13, 1994 (age 31); New York City, U.S.
- Modeling information
- Height: 1.80 m (5 ft 11 in)
- Hair color: Dark brown
- Eye color: Brown
- Agency: Creative Artists Agency (New York, Los Angeles); VIVA Model Management (Paris, London, Barcelona); d'management group (Milan); 2pm Model Management (Copenhagen); Priscilla's Model Management (Sydney)

Janiece Altagracia Dilone (Note: Sources such as Elle Magazine have spelled it Janice rather than Janiece.) (born May 13, 1994), known mononymously as Dilone, is an American model. She has been on the cover of I.D., Harper's Bazaar, InStyle, Vogue Mexico, Vogue Nederland, Vogue Portugal, 10 Magazine, Puss Puss, Porter, T, and Allure and is currently ranked one of the Top 50 models in the industry by models.com.

== Early life ==
Dilone has nine siblings and is of Dominican descent. She goes by Dilone because she wanted to represent her family.

== Career ==
Dilone started modeling at 19. She is signed with DNA Model Management and got her big break in Bottega Veneta's men's fall 2016 show. She gained wider exposure in the 2016 and 2017 Victoria's Secret Fashion Shows. In her debut season, she walked in over 57 shows.

She has starred in advertisements for David Yurman, Balmain, H&M, DKNY, Stella McCartney, Coach, and Versace.

Dilone can be seen alongside models like Adwoa Aboah, Issa Lish, Maria Borges, and Binx Walton in Sephora's "Let Beauty Together" campaign in their stores.

She will star in the crime thriller film, The Good Mother in September 2023.

== Personal life ==
She is openly bisexual and lives in Brooklyn.

== Filmography ==
Year	Title	Role	Notes
2021	Halston	Pat Cleveland	2 episodes
2021	The Novice	Dani	
2021	The Sex Lives of College Girls	Maddy	2 episodes
2023	The Good Mother	Gina	
2023	Memory	Billie	

== See also ==
- LGBTQ culture in New York City
- List of LGBTQ people from New York City
