= Till Dad Do Us Part =

2001 television film directed by Randall Miller

- Written by: Douglas Soesbe
- Directed by: Randall Miller
- Starring: John Larroquette; Markie Post; Emily Holmes; Jeffrey Jones
- Music by: Mark Adler
- Country of origin: Canada
- Original language: English

Production
- Producer: Shawn Williamson
- Cinematography: Victor Hammer
- Editor: Richard Schwadel
- Running time: 93 minutes
- Production companies: Shavick Entertainment; Daniel L. Paulson Productions

Original release
- Network: Fox Family Channel
- Release: June 17, 2001

Till Dad Do Us Part is a 2001 television comedy film directed by Randall Miller, written by Douglas Soesbe, and starring John Larroquette, Markie Post, and Jeffrey Jones. It was originally televised on the Fox Family Channel on June 17, 2001.

== Premise ==
An overly controlling father tries to dissuade his adored daughter from marrying the man of her dreams, someone of whom the father does not approve. Meddling in her life, the father tries to find a more suitable candidate but ends up making things worse.

== Cast ==
- John Larroquette as Gavin Corbett
- Markie Post as Virginia Corbett
- Emily Holmes as Rebecca Corbett
- Jonathan Cherry as Dennis Quilantip
- Adam Harrington as Brent Fenwick
- Jeffrey Jones as Brady
