= Dark Match (film) =

2024 Canadian film

- Film poster
- Directed by: Lowell Dean
- Written by: Lowell Dean
- Produced by: Rhonda Baker; Don Depoe; Michael Feehan; John K. MacDonald; Michael Peterson
- Starring: Ayisha Issa; Steven Ogg; Sara Canning; Chris Jericho
- Cinematography: Karim Hussain
- Edited by: Dean Evans
- Production companies: Dept.9 Studios; Blue Finch Film Releasing
- Distributed by: Shudder
- Release dates: July 21, 2024 (Fantasia); January 31, 2025
- Running time: 94 minutes
- Country: Canada
- Language: English

Dark Match is a 2024 Canadian slasher film written and directed by Lowell Dean, starring Ayisha Issa, Steven Ogg, Sara Canning, and Chris Jericho. Set in the late 1980s, the film follows SAW, an independent wrestling promotion where Nicky, known as Miss Behave, ignites a bitter rivalry with the popular Kate the Great. Meanwhile, aging wrestler and manager Joe Lean becomes involved in a dangerous one-night event staged in a remote village by a promoter working with cultists led by The Prophet, a former wrestler with a troubled past.

Dark Match premiered at the Fantasia International Film Festival in July 2024 and was released theatrically on January 31, 2025. The film received mixed reviews from critics.

== Plot ==
Set in the late 1980s, the film follows the exploits of SAW, an independent wrestling promotion operating outside mainstream channels. The story centers on Nicky, a prominent wrestler performing under the "heel" persona Miss Behave. Known for her role as a main event talent, Miss Behave is embroiled in a bitter rivalry with the fan-favorite, Kate the Great. During a local event, Miss Behave unexpectedly attacks Kate—slapping and punching her—resulting in a broken nose and a fine on Miss Behave. Although Kate later presents a gracious demeanor, she secretly holds a grudge, planning to seek retribution at an appropriate moment.

In the background is Joe Lean (Ogg), an aging wrestler and manager whose peak years are behind him. Joe, who has long harbored feelings for Miss Behave despite their complicated relationship, finds himself increasingly entangled in the promotion's perilous activities. Meanwhile, SAW's questionable promoter, Rusty, arranges a high-profile, one-night event in a remote village, where the local population consists of fervent cult members. The group is led by a former wrestler known as The Prophet (portrayed by Y2J/Jericho), who once adopted a religious gimmick during his career. In a promo reminiscent of late-1990s wrestling rhetoric, The Prophet—revered as "The Leader" by his followers—hints at a troubled past and a deep-seated resentment toward the wrestling establishment. Joe later recalls that The Prophet's matches grew increasingly violent, culminating in a final encounter for the championship in which Joe was forced to subdue him due to The Prophet's noncompliance.

As the SAW wrestlers arrive at the village, the "faces" are quickly separated from the "heels". Once the heels arrive they are greeted by a party fueled by an abundance of a mysterious green drink. The host greets the crowd and wishes them a blessed Lupracalia before situation quickly deteriorates when members of the cult are seen carrying firearms, and several wrestlers admit to having been drugged. Amid the disarray, Kate the Great appears to take an unusual interest in the unfolding events. The event's matches are organized around elemental themes— Wind, Water, Earth, and Inferno—and both Nicky and Joe are initially persuaded by the promoter's promise of a significant payday. However, as the matches begin, it becomes evident that there is a darker plan at work.

In the opening tag team Wind Match, involving a large fan installed in the ring, the duo Thick n Thin tag team against the Beast Brothers, although initially treating it like a normal match the contest takes a tragic turn when Thick is fatally injured during the altercation. This incident introduces the element of a demonic presence associated with the wrestling event. Later, during the Women's Water Match, Kate and Miss Behave engage in a rematch. Despite previous attempts at reconciliation, the bout becomes increasingly violent. At one point weapons are introduced and Kate the Great uses a mace against Miss Behave who is provided her signature chain, however the match ends with Miss Behave delivering a fatal blow that results in Kate's death. It is later revealed that Kate was The Prophet's daughter, a fact that adds a personal dimension to his actions. In the chaos that follows, The Prophet prepares to confront Miss Behave with a firearm, only to be restrained by the head of security, known as Mr. Ritual (Eklund).

Parallel to these events, Joe and a masked luchadore named Enigma Jones struggle to free themselves from a locked dressing room. As the event continues, tensions rise among the wrestlers. Rusty, the promoter, nearly takes drastic measures out of guilt, and internal betrayals come to light. During the Earth Match, Enigma is set up to fight Kid Humble while the remaining wrestlers confront armed security forces in a heated altercation, with Joe, Nicky, and Rusty eventually overcoming their captors. Rusty confesses to having been misled, and the group reluctantly agrees to work together despite past grievances.

The final segments of the event feature an Inferno Match, in which a "face" member named Lazarus is forced to fight under threat. Unfortunately due to his gimmick of using hairspray before every bout he is quickly defeated and a final showdown ensues that escalates into widespread brawling. In the final showdown, dubbed the "Spirit Match", The Prophet faces off against Joe, and after a series of brutal exchanges, Miss Behave intervenes by delivering a decisive strike that drives a stake through The Prophet's chest, effectively ending his threat. As Joe, Nicky, and Rusty attempt to leave the scene, one of the cult members manages to complete the ritual, forcing them to encounter an unexpected final obstacle, a large greenish demon blocking their path. Unfazed, Nicky prepares to confront this new supernatural challenge head-on.

== Cast ==
- Ayisha Issa as Miss Behave
- Steven Ogg as Joe Lean
- Mo Jabari as Enigma
- Sara Canning as Kate the Great
- Chris Jericho as Prophet
- Michael Eklund as Spencer
- Leo Fafard as Lazarus Smashley
- Jonathan Cherry as Rusty
- Stephanie Wolfe as Carol Ann
- Mitch Clarke as Kid Humble(as Mitchell Clarke)
- Jonathan Lepine as Thick

== Reception ==
On the review aggregator website Rotten Tomatoes, 68% of 19 critics' reviews are positive, with an average rating of 5.9/10. Metacritic, which uses a weighted average, assigned the film a score of 44 out of 100, based on 4 critics, indicating "mixed or average" reviews.

Richard Crouse gave the film three stars and wrote, "Director Lowell Dean embraces the grindhouse aesthetic, bringing dynamic camerawork and inventive lighting to create energy and suspense." Craig D. Lindsey of RogerEbert.com gave the film one and a half out of four stars, writing, "Most likely written under duress, Match is clogged with contradiction and ill-conceived excessiveness."
