= Leo Fafard =

Canadian actor, driver and electrician

- Born: March 24, 1972 (age 53); Canada
- Occupation(s): Actor; Driver; Technical crew

Leo Fafard (born March 24, 1972) is a Canadian actor, driver and technical crew known for playing Lou Garou in WolfCop (2014) and Another WolfCop (2017).

== Career ==
In 2010, Leo Fafard was shooting a music video for a band in Saskatchewan called Rah Rah, where he played a werewolf in their video for song called "Henry". Lowell Dean was the director and by the end of the shoot he asked Leo would he like to be involved with a project called WolfCop.

== Filmography ==
=== Actor ===
Year	Title	Role	Notes
2003	Moccasin Flats	Leonard Shingoose	TV series (2 episodes)
2009	Hungry Hills	Bootlegger	Minor role
2010	I Heart Regina	Hero	Minor role
2014	WolfCop	Sergeant Lou Garou/The WolfCop	Lead role
2014	Corner Gas: The Movie	Werewolf Bad Guy	Cameo appearance
2016	A.R.C.H.I.E.	Dude in Crowd	Uncredited
2017	Another WolfCop	Sergeant Lou Garou/The WolfCop	Lead role
2017	The Humanity Bureau	Motel Clerk	Minor role
2018	SuperGrid	Jesse	Lead role
2019	Ash	Brian	Minor role
2020	Cagefighter: Worlds Collide	Danny Thicket	
2021	Small Town Bringdown	Neil Percival	
2024	Dark Match	Lazarus Smashley	
2024	Die Alone	Hunter	
