= Shooting Guns =

Canadian heavy metal band formed c. 2011

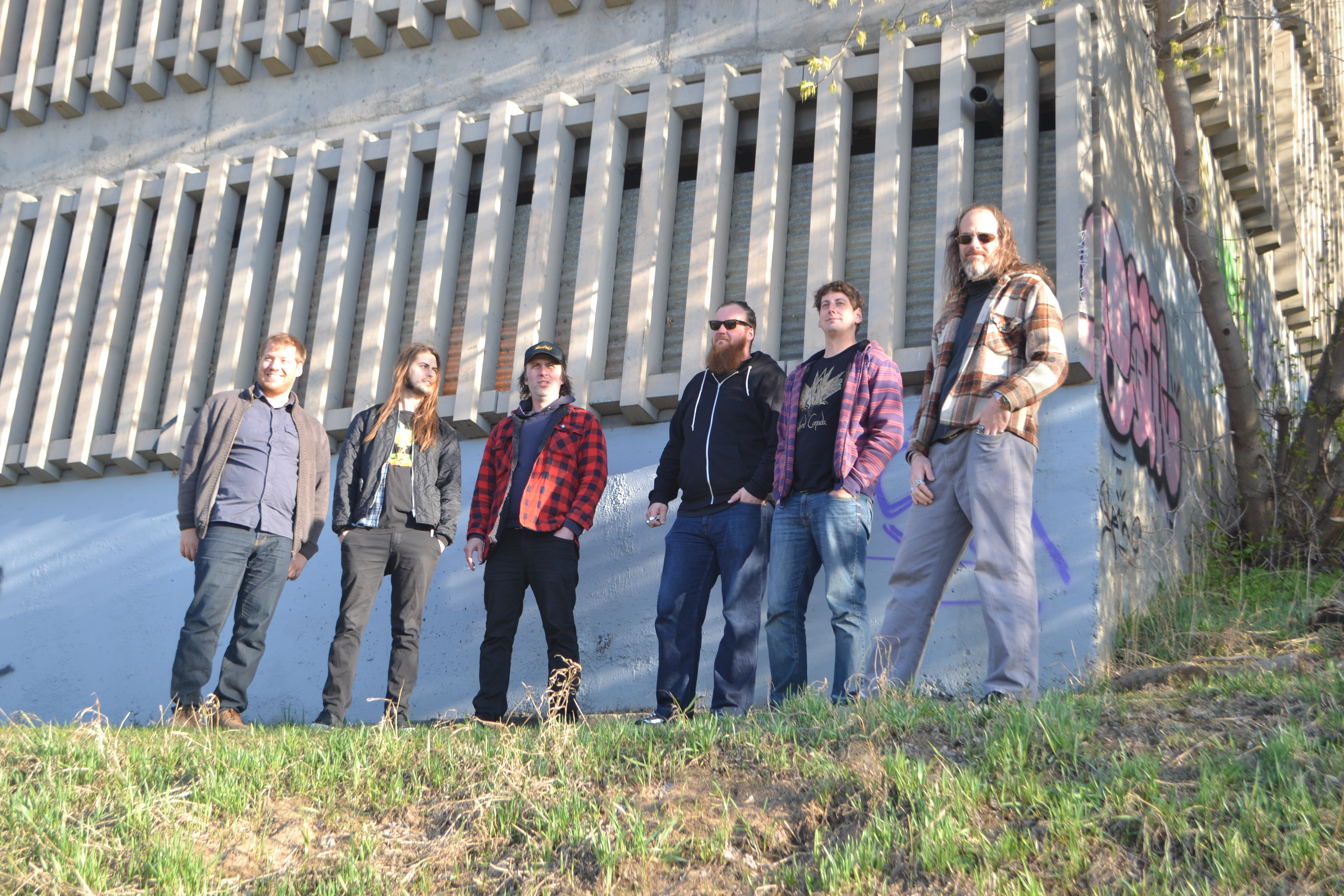
- Toby Bond, Brennan Barclay, Chris Laramee, Keith Doepker, Jim Ginther, Jay Loos

Background information
- Origin: Saskatoon, SK, Canada
- Genres: Heavy metal
- Website: shootingguns.ca

Shooting Guns are a Canadian heavy metal band from Saskatoon, SK. Releasing albums and recordings since 2011, they have been nominated for the JUNO Award and Polaris Prize. Their style is influenced by Black Sabbath and kraut rock.

Shooting Guns scored the soundtrack to Canadian horror-comedy film WolfCop and released the Official Soundtrack in 2014 in partnership with One Way Static, RidingEasy Records, and Cinecoup. Their sophomore LP, Brotherhood of the Ram, released in 2013 through RidingEasy Records was nominated for the Juno Awards of 2015 Metal/Hard Album of the Year and the 2014 Polaris Music Prize. Their debut LP, Born To Deal in Magic: 1952-1976, was also nominated for the 2012 Polaris Music Prize.

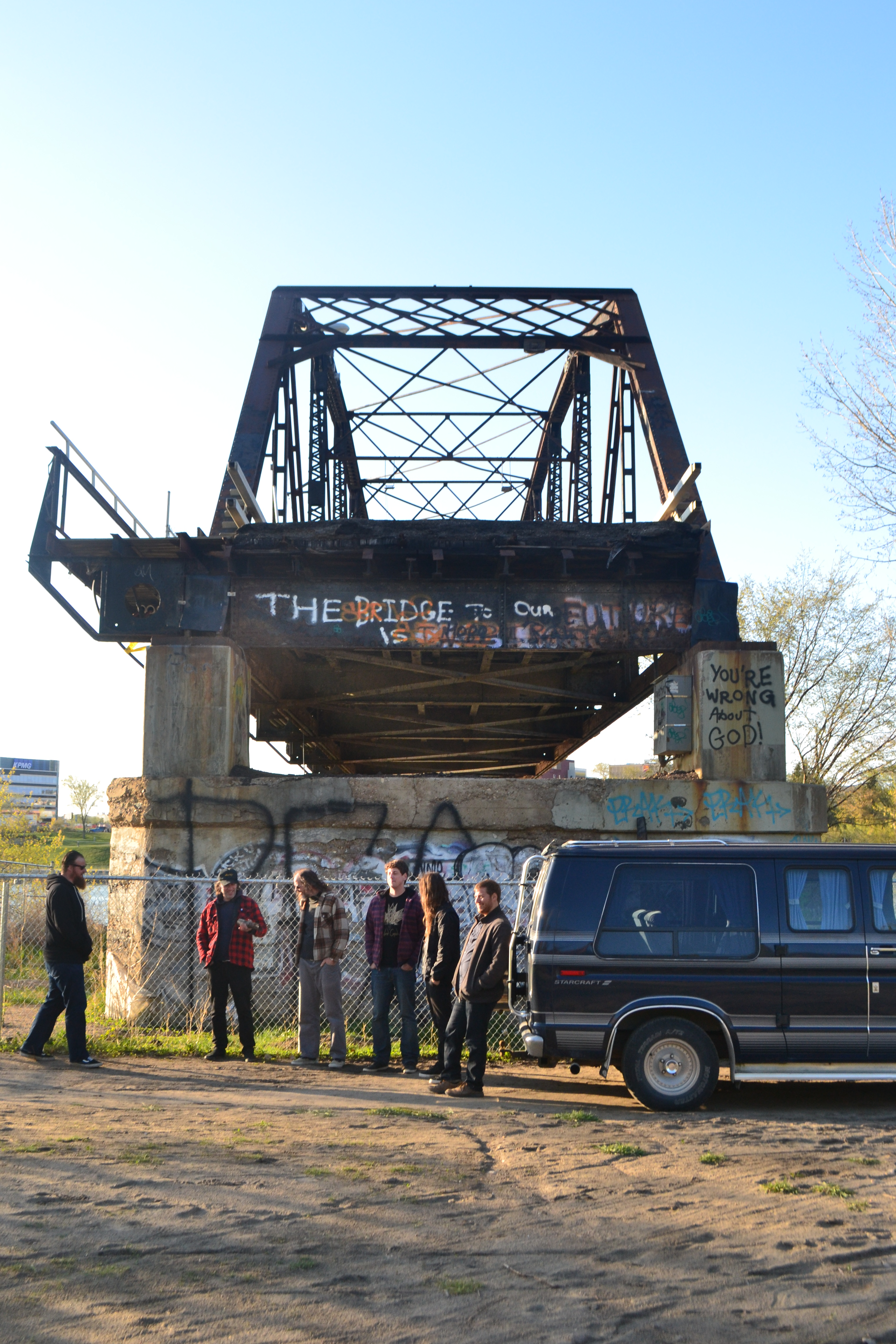
Toby Bond, Brennan Barclay, Chris Laramee, Keith Doepker, Jim Ginther, Jay Loos

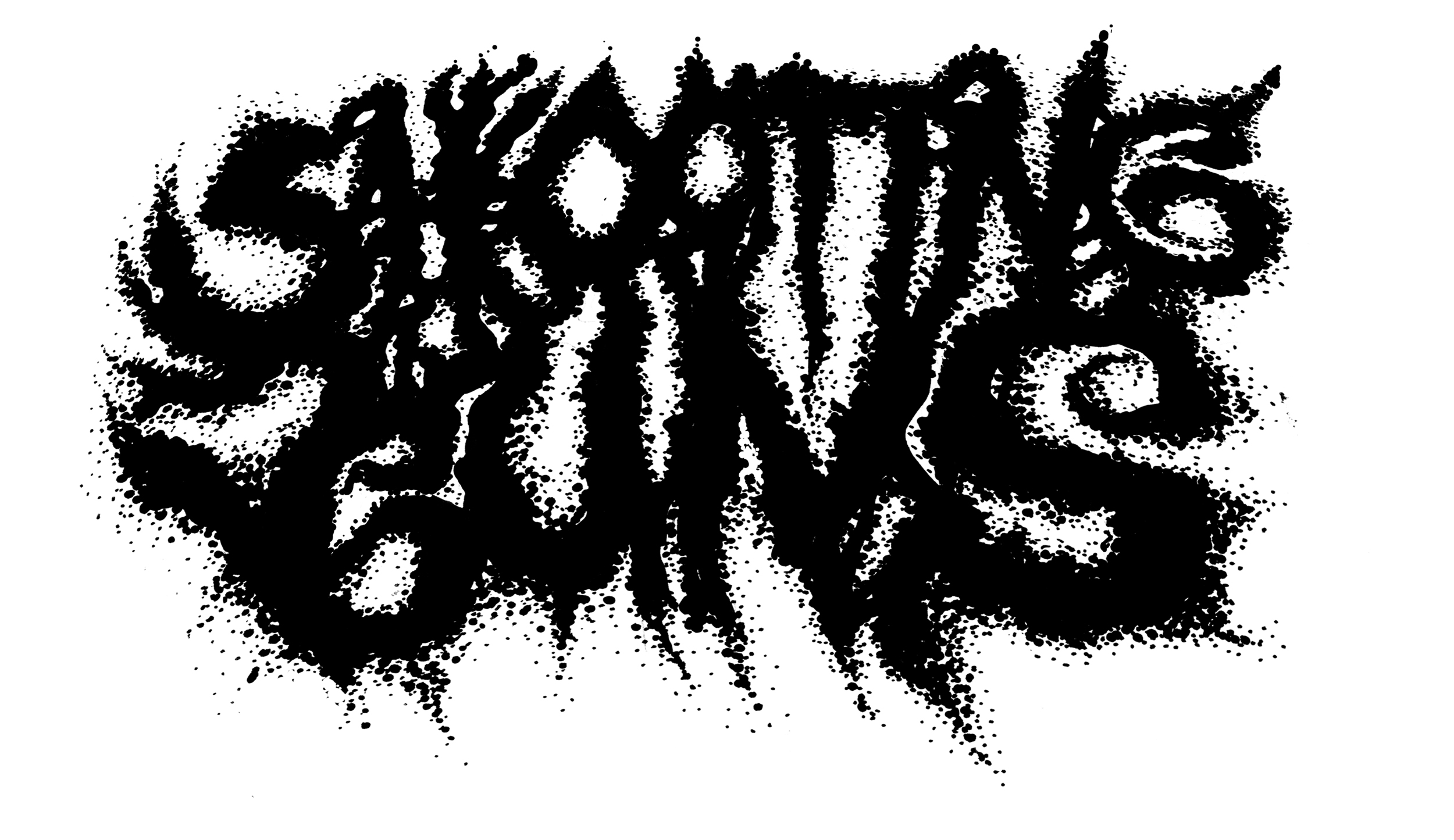
Logo
