= The Maestro (2018 film) =

2018 drama film directed by Adam Cushman

- Official poster
- Directed by: Adam Cushman
- Written by: C.V. Herst
- Produced by: Adam Cushman; David Phillips
- Starring: Xander Berkeley; Sarah Clarke; Leo Marks; William Russ; Mackenzie Astin; Jon Polito; Jonathan Cherry; Raul S. Julia; David Phillips
- Cinematography: Colton Davie
- Edited by: Adam Cushman; Anne Goursaud
- Music by: Lucas Elliot Eberl (Original music); Mario Castelnuovo-Tedesco (Composer)
- Production companies: Phillm Productions; White Rabbit
- Distributed by: Freestyle Releasing
- Release date: December 8, 2018
- Running time: 94 minutes
- Country: United States
- Language: English

The Maestro is a 2018 American historical drama directed, produced by Adam Cushman and David Phillips and written by C.V. Herst, the real-life son of the film's protagonist Jerry Herst. The film features Xander Berkeley as composer Mario Castelnuovo-Tedesco, an Italian immigrant who arrived in Los Angeles in the thirties after evading Mussolini's Italy. The Maestro premiered at the Heartland International Film Festival in 2017. The film was acquired for distribution by Freestyle Releasing and had a limited theatrical release in Los Angeles. The film also features actor Jon Polito as fictional MGM executive Herbert Englehardt in what would be Polito's final performance.

== Plot ==
After World War II, budding musician Jerry Herst (Leo Marks) returns to Los Angeles for one more go at becoming a successful film composer. In Los Angeles, Herst studies with the famed instructor Mario Castelnuovo-Tedesco (Xander Berkeley), whose students include John Williams, André Previn, Henry Mancini, Nelson Riddle and Jerry Goldsmith. Herst, who already had a hit under his belt, 1937's "So Rare", struggles between family pressure and his musical calling, as Tedesco teaches him what it means to be a successful artist.

== Cast ==
- Xander Berkeley as Mario Castelnuovo-Tedesco
- Leo Marks as Jerry Herst
- Mackenzie Astin as Sam Herst
- Sarah Clarke as Clara Castelnuovo-Tedesco
- William Russ as Abe Herst
- Jon Polito as Herbert Englehardt
- Jonathan Cherry as Ray
- Raul S. Julia as Dave
- Bobby Campo as Gene Kelly
- Joelle Sechaud as Mrs. Stella
- David Phillips as Jess Oppenheimer
- Alex Essoe as Cyd Charisse
- Kristen Gutoskie as Estelle Oppenheimer
- Lenny Von Dohlen as Luc
- Michael Johnston as Pietro Castelnuovo-Tedesco
- Omar Doom as Stanley Kubrick

== Release ==
The film played several festivals before its official release, receiving the Audience Award at the Tallgrass Film Festival in 2018, the Jury Award at the Borrego Springs Film Festival in 2019, the Silver Palm award at the 2018 Mexico International Film Festival, and the Youth Film Award at the Rhode Island International Film Festival in 2018. Actor Xander Berkeley received "Best Actor" awards at the 2017 Oaxaca FilmFest and the 2018 Albuquerque Film & Music Experience.

On Rotten Tomatoes it has a rating of 83% based on reviews from 6 critics.
