= Restraint (2017 film) =

2017 psychological horror film directed by Adam Cushman

- Official Poster
- Directed by: Adam Cushman
- Written by: Adam Cushman
- Produced by: Jake Borowski; Julia Taft; Adam Cushman; Amelia Yokel
- Starring: Dana Ashbrook; Caitlyn Folley; John Hensley; Isabella Celaya
- Cinematography: Colton Davie
- Edited by: Rosie Nakamura
- Music by: Hilmar Örn Hilmarsson; Axel Ingi Arnason
- Production company: BYT MEdia
- Distributed by: Breaking Glass Pictures
- Release dates: August 2017 (Rhode Island Film Festival); November 6, 2018
- Running time: 95 minutes
- Country: United States
- Language: English

Restraint is a 2017 American psychological horror film written and directed by Adam Cushman. The film stars Dana Ashbrook and Caitlyn Folley as a newly married couple whose lives unravel after Angela (Caitlyn Folley) begins reacting violently to her new suburban environment.

== Plot ==
After Angela moves to suburbia with her controlling new husband and his 9-year-old daughter, she begins to exhibit strange behavior such as sleepwalking and nightmares. These ailments soon permeate her everyday life as her husband struggles to diagnose her physical and mental issues. Angela's burgeoning aggression becomes directed at her step-daughter Maddie, whose silent pleas to her father go unnoticed.

== Cast ==
- Dana Ashbrook as Jeff Burroughs
- Caitlyn Folley as Angela Burroughs
- John Hensley as Rob
- Isabella Celaya as Madison Burroughs

== Release ==
The film premiered at the Rhode Island International Film Festival where it won the "Best Feature" award. It was subsequently acquired for US distribution by Breaking Glass Pictures and released on November 6, 2018.

Alex Saveliev writing for Film Threat gave the film 4 out of 10 stars, saying "Restraint should have had more excess. Perhaps it would’ve worked as a farce, a phantasmagorical, theatrical, balls-out descent into madness." Cushman won the "Best Director" award for the film at the 2017 Downtown Los Angeles Film Festival. He also won the "Best Director" award for the film at the 2018 Queens World Film Festival. The film also played the 2017 Buffalo International Film Festival.
