= Amy Matysio =

Canadian actress

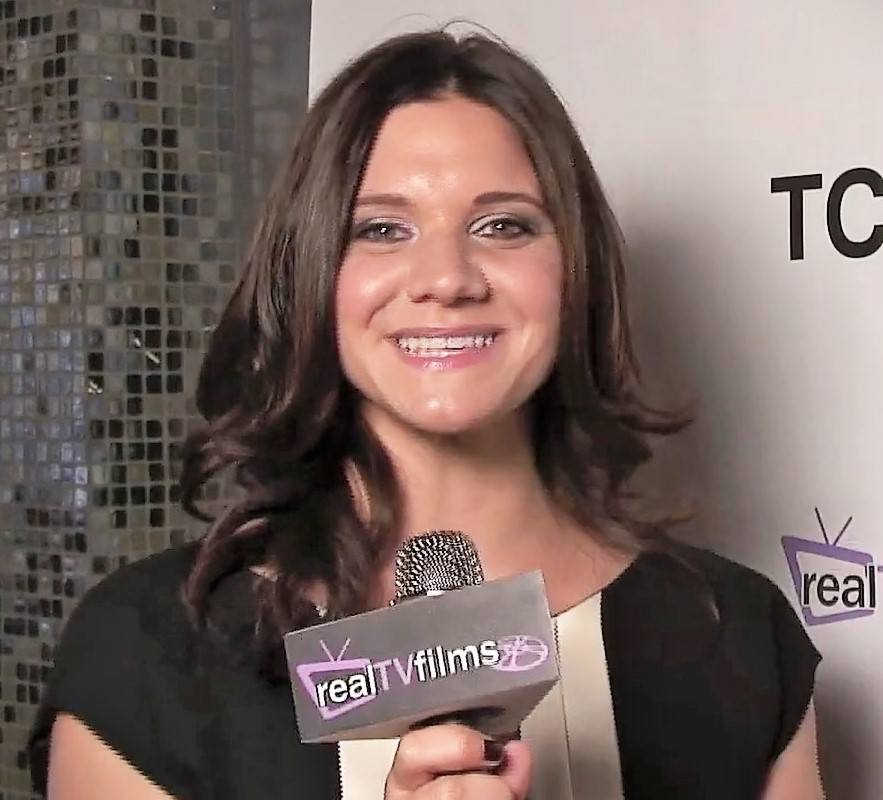
Matysio in 2010

Amy Matysio is a Canadian theatre, television and film actress.

== Early life and education ==
Matysio was born in Regina, Saskatchewan. She holds a Bachelor of Fine Arts in Theatre (Performance) from the University of Regina and has also studied at York St John University in York, England.

== Career ==
Matysio has appeared at several improvisational theatre festivals across Canada, and is a member of General Fools Improvisational Theatre. She has starred in the romantic comedy film Just Friends, the crime thriller Dolan's Cadillac, the psychological thriller Chained, and the comedy horror film Wolf Cop.

She received a Canadian Screen Award nomination for Best Actress in a Drama Program or Limited Series at the 7th Canadian Screen Awards in 2019 for her performance in Save Me.

=== Stage ===
- HONK! (Globe Theatre)
- Loud & Queer (Globe Theatre)
- On the Line (Globe Theatre)
- Over (As-Q Theater Collective)
- The Shape of Things (Theatre Ecstasis)
- Measure for Measure (Shakespeare on the Saskatchewan)
- Hamlet (Shakespeare on the Saskatchewan)
- The Merry Wives of Windsor (Shakespeare on the Saskatchewan)
- Love's Labor's Lost (Shakespeare on the Saskatchewan)
- Pageant (On the Verge, National Arts Centre, Saskatchewan Playwrights Center, Hot House Theatre).
- Just So (Globe Theatre)

=== Film and television ===
- Just Friends as Darla
- The Tommy Douglas Story
- The Risen
- I Accuse
- I'll be Seeing You
- The Unsaid
- Television series Corner Gas
- Incredible Story Studio and renegadepress.com.
- Vampire Dog (2012)
- Chained (2012)
- Stranded (2013)
- Lawrence & Holloman (2013)
- WolfCop (2014)
- Guilt Free Zone (2015–2019)
- Another WolfCop (filmed 2016, release 2017)
- Save Me (2017)
- 3 Amigonauts (2017) as The Donettes
- Mysticons (2017–2018) as Mallory
- SuperGrid (2018)
- Running With Violet season 2 (2019)
