= Adam Cushman =

American film director and writer

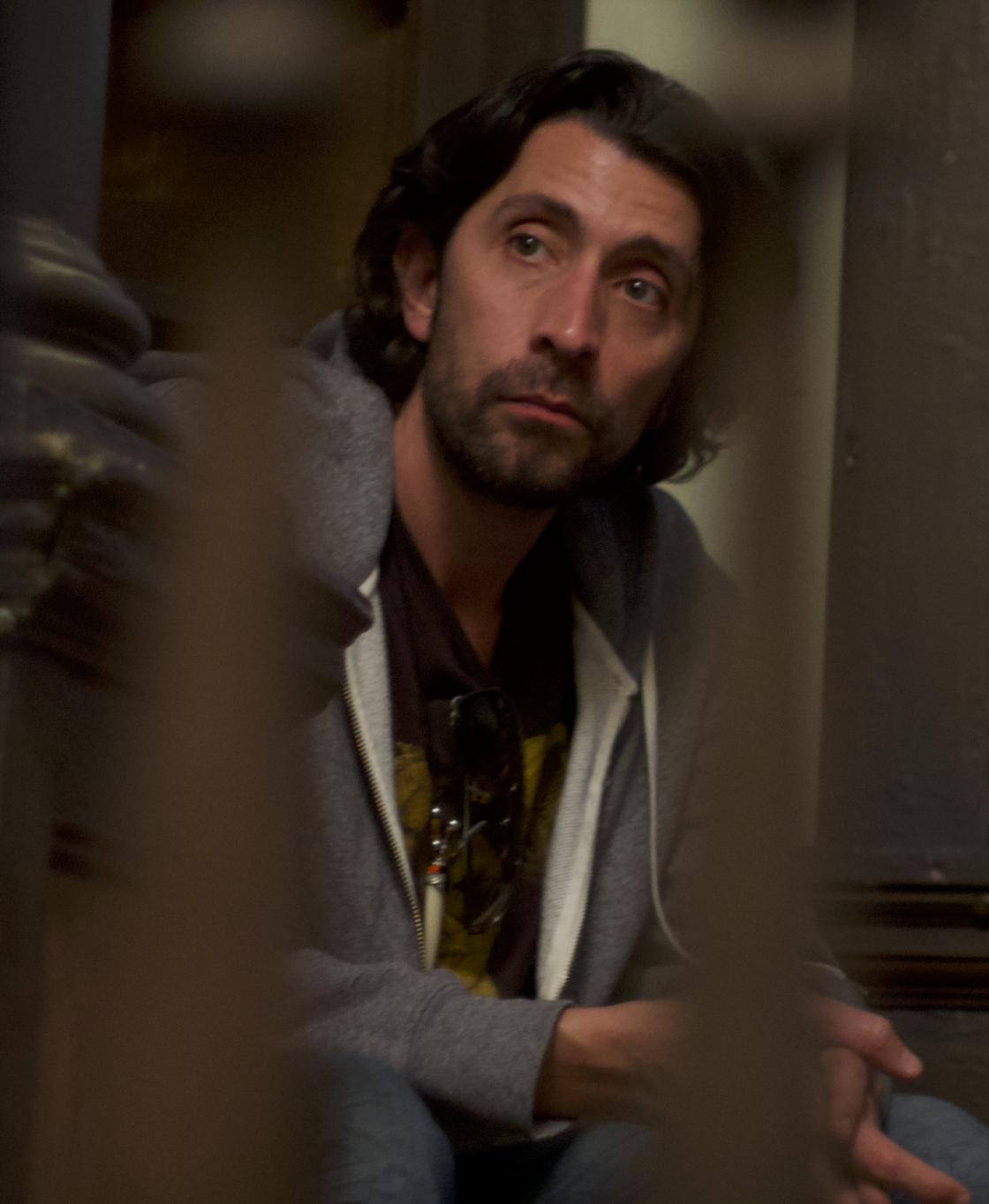
- Born: October 10, 1974 (age 52)
- Occupations: Film director, producer, writer
- Years active: 2003–present

Adam Cushman (born October 10, 1974) is an American film director, producer, screenwriter and author. He directed the films Restraint and The Maestro. His books include the novel Cut (2014) and Critically Acclaimed (2018).

== Life and career ==
Cushman grew up in Miami, Florida and attended The University of Miami and Columbia University for graduate studies. In 2017 he wrote and directed the psychological horror film Restraint starring Dana Ashbrook and Caitlyn Folley. The film was released in November 2018 by Breaking Glass Pictures. His second feature film was the historical period drama The Maestro, starring Xander Berkeley as real-life composer Mario Castelnuovo-Tedesco.

Restraint premiered at the Rhode Island International Film Festival in 2018, where it won the festival's top prize, the "Best Narrative Feature" award. It also played the 2017 Downtown Los Angeles Film Festival and 2018 Queens World Festival where Cushman was both times awarded "Best Director". The Maestro premiered at the 2017 Heartland Film Festival and won awards at other festivals for both the film and lead actor Xander Berkeley. In a complimentary review of The Maestro, Nick Schager of Variety wrote, "Cushman crafts his material with sunlight-dappled aesthetic elegance. And even when he indulges in spinning, arm-twirling pontificating, Berkeley brings a calm soulfulness to Castelnuovo-Tedesco."

Cushman is also the founder of Film 14, which produces book trailers for publishers such as Penguin Teen, Harper Collins, and MacMillan as well as individual authors.

== Filmography ==
Feature films

- Restraint (2017) – director, writer, producer
- The Maestro (2018) – director, editor, producer

Short films

- Five Families (2019) - director, writer, producer
