= Another WolfCop =

- Fantasia Festival poster
- Directed by: Lowell Dean
- Written by: Lowell Dean
- Produced by: Bernie Hernando; Deborah Marks; Hugh Patterson
- Starring: Leo Fafard; Amy Matysio; Jonathan Cherry; Yannick Bisson
- Cinematography: Adam Swica
- Edited by: Ken Simpson
- Music by: Shooting Guns
- Production companies: The Coup Company; Vortex Worlds Pictures
- Distributed by: RLJE Films
- Release dates: July 29, 2017 (Fantasia International Film Festival); December 1, 2017 (Canada)
- Running time: 82 minutes
- Country: Canada
- Language: English
- Box office: $7,285

Another WolfCop is a 2017 Canadian superhero comedy film written and directed by Lowell Dean and is the sequel to the 2014 film WolfCop. It was released in theatres December 1, 2017. The poster was modeled on the 1986 Sylvester Stallone film Cobra.

== Plot ==
A few months after the events of the first film, alcoholic werewolf cop Lou Garou, aka "WolfCop", continues to fight crime in the small town of Woodhaven. Garou's partner, Tina Walsh, has become the new police chief—however, Garou's tendencies to violently dispatch criminals in his wolf form has left her frustrated, especially since she is trying to keep Garou's WolfCop identity a secret from the rest of the town. Meanwhile, Sydney Swallows, an immensely wealthy businessman and author of self-help books, has helped reinvigorate Woodhaven's economy by re-opening the old brewery under the new name "Darkstar", under which he creates a trendy, newly-developed "Chicken Milk" flavoured beer.

After slaughtering a gang of criminals attempting to transport a large crate to an unknown location, Garou learns that there may be more reptilian "shifters" in town when he notices that the tag on the crate features the shifter's symbol. The next morning, Garou opens the crate, and is shocked to find that it has Willie Higgins, his supposedly deceased friend, inside. Willie explains that he has been alive the whole time, and had actually been abducted by shapeshifters, one of whom assumed his identity.

At night, Garou transforms into WolfCop, and a strange, talking parasite resembling Willie emerges from Willie's stomach. Elsewhere, a group of scientists working for Swallows have secretly been constructing a cyborg named Frank, which later murders several people at a strip club. New recruit officers Daisy and Scott head over to investigate, and Scott is killed by Frank. Daisy calls for backup, and Garou and Tina arrive at the strip club. They manage to destroy Frank, but Garou is seriously wounded in the process.

Willie drives Garou to the neighbouring town of Regina and meets with his sister Kat, an occult specialist whom heals Garou's wounds using a moon rock. Later that night, Garou and Kat head into the latter's bedroom, and Kat reveals herself to be a werecat before the two have sex. Meanwhile, Willie watches a television commercial featuring Swallows. When the parasite sees Swallows in the commercial, however, it bursts out of Willie's body and turns into a small, hostile shifter, whom Kat shoots and kills after it attacks Garou.

Back in Woodhaven, Tina realises that Swallows might be hiding menacing secrets when she notices that the logo of his business contains the shifter's symbol. She heads to the brewery with Daisy to investigate, where they eavesdrop on a meeting occurring between Swallows and his assistants, in which Swallows mentions a "final solution". Later, Tina and Daisy overhear when Sydney has the town mayor Bubba Rich drink a can of Chicken Milk, before using a glowing metal instrument that emits high sound frequencies to make another mini-shifter burst out of Rich's chest and kill him. Tina and Daisy try to escape, but Daisy is caught and abducted, and Garou is forced to leave her behind.

After getting a call from Tina, Garou and Willie return to Woodhaven, which is preparing to host a major hockey game at a newly-constructed arena. Using Kat's moon rock, Garou is able to transform into WolfCop despite the lack of a full moon. WolfCop, Willie and Tina infiltrate the arena by disguising themselves as a goalie, referee and security guard respectfully. During the opening ceremony, Swallows introduces the "Darkstars", the town's new hockey team, and gets the crowd to drink Chicken Milk as a "toast" before having one of his assistants (acting as the organist) activate the glowing instrument. The mini-shifters kill several spectators before Willie kills the organist and bangs on the microphone. The resulting mic feedback causes the mini-shifters to stop their attack. As the remaining audience members flee the building, Swallows reveals he is holding Daisy hostage and orders the Darkstars to attack Garou. Garou is able to kill each of the Darkstars and Swallows's other henchman with the assistance of the werecat Kat. Simultaneously, Tina manages to get Daisy away from Swallows. However, Swallows reveals he has rigged the place with explosions and escapes before the officers can shoot him. The remaining survivors manage to escape the building right before it blows up, and decide to head to the bar the next morning as the movie ends on a cliffhanger.

== Cast ==
- Leo Fafard as Sergeant Lou Garou/The WolfCop
- Amy Matysio as Chief Sheriff Tina Walsh
- Jonathan Cherry as Willie Higgins
- Sara Miller as Kat Higgins
- Yannick Bisson as Sydney Swallows
- Devery Jacobs as Daisy
- Warren Bates as Scott
- Kris "The Raven" Blackwell as Number Two
- Kevin Smith as Mayor Bubba Rich (uncredited)

== Production ==
Filmed in Lumsden, Saskatchewan and Sudbury, Ontario in the early months of 2016.

== Reception ==
On the review aggregator website Rotten Tomatoes, 65% of 17 critics' reviews are positive, with an average rating of 5.4/10.

Noel Murray of the Los Angeles Times called it "a one-stop shop for just that kind of good-natured vulgarity" and "even grosser and wackier than its predecessor." Murray warns that the film isn't for everyone, but that if you are interested in the premise of a WolfCop, "you probably won't be disappointed". Trace Thurman of BloodyDisgusting.com wrote, "Another WolfCop isn't high art. It's just a fun, gory and hilarious midnight movie that will scratch your itch for camp. If you enjoyed the first WolfCop, you'll most certainly love the sequel!" The film premiered a "Ruff Cut" at Fantastic Fest (Austin, Texas) in 2016 to positive reviews. The Canadian premiere was at the Fantasia International Film Festival (Montreal, Quebec) where it won the Audience Choice Award (Gold) for best Canadian / Quebec feature film.

John Semley of the Globe and Mail gave it 1.5 out of 4 and wrote: "It may well be brain dead, dumb and intermittently a bit fun. But sometimes we need a bit more." Simon Abrams of RogerEbert.com gave it 1.5 out of 4 and wrote: "The kind of bad movie that sounds amazing on paper, but is excruciating to watch, even at a brisk 82 minutes."

== Home media ==
The film earned an estimated $122,713 in DVD and Blu-ray sales.

== Sequel ==
The final credits promise that "WolfCop will return". Lowell Dean expressed his hopes to continue the character in some way and hoped to make a third or even fourth film.
