= WolfCop =

- Theatrical release poster
- Directed by: Lowell Dean
- Written by: Lowell Dean
- Produced by: Bernie Hernando; Deborah Marks; Danielle Masters; Hugh Patterson
- Starring: Leo Fafard; Amy Matysio; Jonathan Cherry; Sarah Lind; Jesse Moss
- Cinematography: Peter La Rocque
- Edited by: Mark Montague
- Music by: Shooting Guns
- Distributed by: RLJE Films; StudioCanal (United Kingdom)
- Release date: 6 June 2014
- Running time: 79 minutes
- Country: Canada
- Language: English

WolfCop is a 2014 Canadian superhero film written and directed by Lowell Dean, and starring Jesse Moss, Amy Matysio, Jonathan Cherry, Sarah Lind, Aidan Devine, Corrine Conley and Leo Fafard. Produced by Hugh Patterson. The film's plot concerns an alcoholic small town cop who transforms into a werewolf after being cursed; he still possesses his human intelligence in wolf form and continues his work as a police officer even in wolf form.

WolfCop was released to Cineplex Odeon theatres in Canada on 6 June 2014, and was released on DVD and Blu-ray in the United Kingdom on 13 October 2014. It was followed by a sequel, Another WolfCop, in 2017.

== Plot ==
In October of 2014, Lou Garou, an alcoholic cop in the small community of Woodhaven, spends most of his day either asleep at work or at Jessica's bar. When his friend Willie Higgins phones in a complaint of occult activity in the area of his gun store, the police chief sends Garou to investigate. After meeting with Higgins, Garou dismisses his concerns as the actions of heavy metal fans. Higgins again reports a disturbance, and the chief forces Garou to investigate. When he arrives at the scene, Garou finds occultists in the middle of a ceremony to sacrifice an upstart politician who was running on a platform of reform and anti-corruption. Garou is knocked out and wakes up the next morning in his bed, not remembering how he got there, though he has a pentagram carved into his stomach.

Garou's senses become extremely sharp, and his wounds heal near-instantly. As he investigates the case, he surprises Jessica and his coworkers, all of whom had written him off as lazy and incompetent. As he goes over his notes at Jessica's bar, she encourages him to drink more and invites him to join her privately. Before he can, two criminals who are part of a local gang sneak into the bar and attack him in the bathroom. Garou, who is in the middle of a transformation into a werewolf, easily kills one and drives off the other. Angry that they did not kidnap Garou, the gang leader stabs out the eye of the escaped gangster when he claims to have seen Garou transform into a monster. Meanwhile, Garou ends up in Higgins' house, handcuffed to the bed. Higgins explains that he captured Garou and restrained him for his own safety. Higgins later researches his condition, and they learn that occult ceremonies in which a werewolf is sacrificed can strengthen the magic of reptilian shapeshifters.

Garou and his partner, Tina, investigate the deaths at the bar and a series of seemingly unrelated armed robberies by a gang who wear pig masks. Higgins convinces Garou that he must be restrained at night, and Garou submits to being locked in the town's jail. However, when the police station receives a call for help, Garou, who has since transformed into a werewolf but has retained his human intelligence, dons his policeman's uniform and heads to the local supermarket, where the pig-mask gang have taken hostages. Garou savagely kills all the pig-mask robbers and heads toward a meth lab. Higgins cowers in the car as Garou again savagely kills several gun-wielding gangsters. When they return to the police station, Jessica seduces Garou while he is in his werewolf form, only to reveal that she is a shapeshifter and also the town's elderly mayor. Higgins also reveals himself as a shapeshifter and theorizes that Garou's alcoholism has made him stronger than their previous victims, all of whom they were able to control.

Garou is drugged and brought to a second ceremony, where he is to be sacrificed during an eclipse so that the town's ruling elite, all of whom are reptilian shapeshifters, can continue to hide their true identity and rule indefinitely. Tina arrives and confronts the police chief, who shapeshifts into the gang leader, and Higgins. Tina and Garou kill Higgins, Jessica, and the gang members, but the chief surprises them with a sneak attack and angers Lou by revealing that he killed his father. Weakened by the approaching eclipse, Garou is wounded when shot by the chief, but he realizes that alcohol is the source of his enhanced power. As Garou consumes a flask of alcohol, Tina impales the police chief on a sword. He uses it to also stab her, but before he can finish her, Garou shoots and kills the police chief. Garou and Tina limp off together, and Garou promises to drop her off at a hospital after he gets another drink.

== Cast ==
Cast in credits order:

- Leo Fafard as Sergeant Lou Garou/The WolfCop (loup garou is French for werewolf)
- Amy Matysio as Sergeant Tina
- Jonathan Cherry as Willie Higgins
- Sarah Lind as Jessica
- Aidan Devine as Chief Officer
- Jesse Moss as Gang Leader
- Corinne Conley as Mayor Bradley
- James Whittingham as Coroner
- Ryland Alexander as Terry Wallace

== Production ==
Filming began in October 2013 in Regina, Saskatchewan, and surrounding area. It is Dean's second feature having previously shot 13 Eerie in the same location. WolfCop relied on "retro-style" practical effects instead of computer-generated imagery.

== Soundtrack ==
The soundtrack was composed by Saskatoon, Saskatchewan instrumental band Shooting Guns and Toby Bond, who joined the band shortly after. The band composed 76 minutes of original material for the score and released the WolfCop Original Soundtrack on vinyl and limited-release cassette through One Way Static in September 2014. The soundtrack was also released digitally in Sept 2014 through RidingEasy Records.

== Reception ==
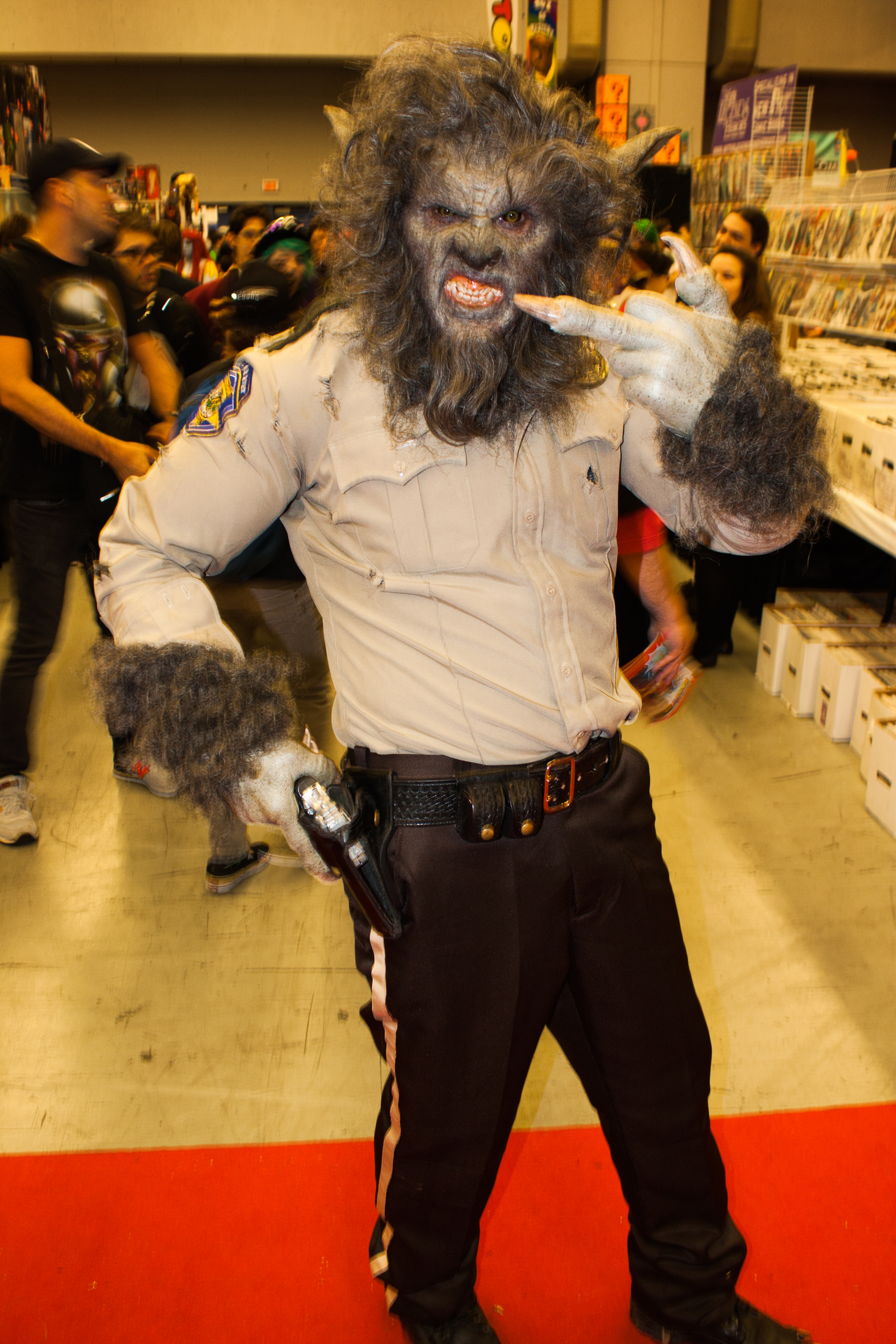
Cosplay at the Montreal Comiccon 2016

On the review aggregator website Rotten Tomatoes, 63% of 19 critics' reviews are positive, with an average rating of 5.6/10. The website's consensus reads: "There's a new sheriff in town, and this one bites: Wolfcop packs a silly punch with just enough fun to rip the laughter right out of you."

Patrick Cooper of Bloody Disgusting gave WolfCop a positive review, writing: "A perfect storm of creature action, the occult, gore, intrigue, humor, and lycanthropic puns, WolfCop is destined for cult glory." Leslie Felperin of The Guardian gave it a score of three out of five stars and wrote, "You can't help but warm to this old-school Canadian horror-comedy about a law enforcer with a snout for crime". Craig Anderson of Fangoria rated it four out of five stars, writing: "While Wolfcop does tend to overreach, and too-often falls back on its predictable buddy-cop formula splatstick shtick, it's still plenty fun". Andrew Mack of Twitch Film called the film "a mix of horror and comedy that does not take off right away but builds momentum to a satisfying conclusion." Dread Central's Scott Hallam rated it three-and-a-half out of five stars, concluding that, "If you enjoy a horror-comedy that's just out for a laugh and never takes itself too seriously, you'll enjoy WolfCop."

Conversely, Bruce DeMara of The Toronto Star gave the film a score of one-and-a-half out of four stars, asserting that its humor never rises beyond the French pun used for Fafard's character. Radheyan Simonpillai, in his review of WolfCop for Now, summarized the film thus: "Aiming for so-bad-it's-good status, this derivative effort gets stuck in moderately bad."

== Sequel ==
In an interview with Fangoria, director Lowell Dean confirmed a sequel to the film. Another WolfCop was filmed in Lumsden, Saskatchewan, in the early months of 2016, featuring most of the same characters, played by the same actors (most of whom are locals of Regina, Saskatchewan). It was released on 1 December 2017.
