= 14th Canadian Comedy Awards =

Festival and awards ceremony for works of 2012

- Date: 6 October 2013
- Location: Centrepointe Theatre; Ottawa, Ontario
- Country: Canada
- Presented by: Canadian Comedy Foundation for Excellence
- Hosted by: Ryan Belleville

Highlights
- Most wins: Television/Internet: Dad Drives and Mr. D (2); Film: My Awkward Sexual Adventure (2)
- Most nominations: Television: Seed (5); Film: My Awkward Sexual Adventure, Please Kill Mr. Know It All (6); Person: Mark Little (4)
- Website: www.canadiancomedyawards.org

The 14th Canadian Comedy Awards, presented by the Canadian Comedy Foundation for Excellence (CCFE), honoured the best live, television, film, and Internet comedy of 2012. The ceremony was held at Centrepointe Theatre in Ottawa, Ontario, on 6 October 2013 and was hosted by Ryan Belleville.

Canadian Comedy Awards, also known as Beavers, were awarded in 26 categories. Winners in 5 categories were chosen by the public through an online poll and others were chosen by members of industry organizations. The awards ceremony concluded the Canadian Comedy Awards Festival which ran from 3 to 6 October and included over 20 comedy events.

The films My Awkward Sexual Adventure and Please Kill Mr. Know It All led with six nominations each, followed by the film Dead Before Dawn 3D and TV series Seed with five. My Awkward Sexual Adventure won two Beavers, as did TV series Mr. D and Mark Little for web series Dad Drives. Colin Mochrie was named Canadian comedy person of the year.

== Festival and ceremony ==
The 14th Canadian Comedy Awards (CCA) was held in Ottawa, Ontario. The gala awards ceremony was held on 6 October 2013 at Centrepointe Theatre hosted by Ryan Belleville. Belleville had previously hosted the 2007 CCA awards ceremony and won the Bluma Appel Award in 2001.

The awards ceremony concluded the four-day Canadian Comedy Awards Festival which ran from 3 to 6 October, with over 20 events at venues including Yuk Yuk's, Absolute Comedy, Arts Council Theatre, and Centrepointe Theatre. Alan Thicke hosted a 4 October show featuring Ottawa natives Jon Dore, Jeremy Hotz, Tom Green, Mike MacDonald and Rebecca Kohler, and a headline show with stand-up comedians Harland Williams, Nikki Payne and Seán Cullen on 5 October. The shows raised money for MacDonald who was making a comeback following a liver transplant. On the same evening as the Ottawa showcase, a Toronto Comedy All-Stars show was scheduled at the National Arts Centre, in what some called the Battle of Ontario.

Among the talks by industry experts was a discussion panel with Tim Long, executive producer of The Simpsons and former head-writer for David Letterman. This was the first year the festival included francophone talent with the show Le Spectacle Francophone at Yuk Yuk's on 4 October.

Published with the festival guide was a compact history of the capital region, Ottawa: Gateway to Carp. Written by John Mazerolle with assistance from other comedians, it suggests that the infamous tedium of Ottawa made fertile ground for the growth of comedy. Festival founder and Ottawa native Tim Progosh suggested that as a government town, there has been a variety of cultures which raises one's reference level, combined with an oral tradition of the Rideau Valley where Irish and French immigrants met and shared stories.

The Jokers vs. Senators Alumni charity hockey game was held at Bell Sensplex on 5 October. A cocktail reception raised money for the Ottawa public library.

== Winners and nominees ==
The nomination criteria were altered this year so that feature film and television categories could include works released on the Internet.

Winners are listed first and highlighted in boldface:

=== Multimedia ===
Canadian Comedy Person of the Year	Best Feature Film
**Colin Mochrie**; Gerry Dee; Lauren Ash; Steve Patterson; Sugar Sammy	**Goon**; Dead Before Dawn 3D; My Awkward Sexual Adventure; Please Kill Mr. Know It All; Unlucky
Best Direction in a Feature	Best Writing in a Feature
**Sean Garrity** – **My Awkward Sexual Adventure**; April Mullen – Dead Before Dawn 3D; Sandra Feldman, Colin Carter – Please Kill Mr. Know It All; Ian A. Robertson – Unlucky	**Christopher Bond** and **Trevor Martin** – **A Little Bit Zombie**; Tim Doiron – Dead Before Dawn 3D; Jonas Chernick – My Awkward Sexual Adventure; Sandra Feldman – Please Kill Mr. Know It All
Best Male Performance in a Feature	Best Female Performance in a Feature
**Jim Annan** – **Unlucky**; Devon Bostick – Dead Before Dawn 3D; Angelo Tsarouchas – Fred and Vinnie; Vik Sahay – My Awkward Sexual Adventure; Jefferson Brown – Please Kill Mr. Know It All	**Emily Hampshire** – **My Awkward Sexual Adventure**; Brittany Allen – Dead Before Dawn 3D; Sarah Manninen – My Awkward Sexual Adventure; Jessica Booker – Please Kill Mr. Know It All; Lara Jean Chorostecki – Please Kill Mr. Know It All
Best Direction in a TV or Web Series	Best Writing in a TV or Web Series
**Adam Brodie** and **Dave Derewlany** – **Funny as Hell** (S03E09); Jared Sales – Guidance; Jeff Beesley – inSAYSHAble – Tuesday; Henry Sarwer-Foner – Rick Mercer Report – episode #11; Geoff Lapaire – Space Janitors – Accidentally the Dark Lord	**Dan Beirne** and **Mark Little** – **Dad Drives** episode 3; Mark De Angelis – Bill & Sons Towing – episode #4; Joseph Raso – Seed – episode #1.02; Mark Farrell, Joseph Raso – Seed – episode #1.07; Mark Farrell – Seed – episode #1.05
Best Male Performance in a TV or Web Series	Best Female Performance in a TV or Web Series
**Mark Little** – **Dad Drives** episode 3; Gary Rideout Jr. – Comedy Bar – season 2; Rob Baker – Guidance – "Alasandro"; Mark Little – Mr. D – episode #2.08; Scott Yamamura – Space Janitors	**Naomi Snieckus** – **Mr. D**; Amy Matysio – inSAYSHAble; Christina Sicoli – inSAYSHAble; Dale Boyer – Live from the CenTre; Carrie-Lynn Neales – Seed – episode #1.01; Belinda Cornish – Tiny Plastic Men – "Pleasing Petra"
Best Ensemble Performance in a TV or Web Series	Best Radio Program or Clip
**The Imponderables**, **Nicholas Campbell** – **Bill & Sons Towing**; Gary Rideout Jr, Pat Thornton, Tal Zimerman, Norm Sousa, Natalie Brown – Comedy Bar, season 2; Gerry Dee, Jonathan Torrens, Booth Savage, Lauren Hammersley, Bette MacDonald, Naomi Snieckus, Darrin Rose, Mark Little, Wes Williams, Mark Forward, Suresh John – Mr. D; Brendan Halloran, Pat Thornton, Evany Rosen, Tess Degenstein, Scott Yamamura – Space Janitors; Mark Critch, Cathy Jones, Susan Kent, Shaun Majumder – This Hour Has 22 Minutes	**This Is That** season 3; Darren Frost, Dave Martin, Ron James – Anything Goes – "Ron James Interview"; Graham Chittenden, Patrick McKenna, Pete Zedlacher & Rebecca Kohler – The Debaters: BBQ vs. Picnic & Canadian Flag; Marianne Copithorne, Neil Grahn, Mark Meer, Jana O'Connor, Donovan Workun – The Irrelevant Show; Ron Sparks, Fred Kennedy & Nicole Yovanoff – The Newsdesk with Ron Sparks, 102.1 The Edge
Best Comedy Short	Best Podcast
**Internet Search History Revealed**; Boys Without Girls; One Woman Show; Secret Clubhouse; The Hunger Games Exclusive Clip: Gale & Katniss	**Stop Podcasting Yourself**; Illusionoid; The Sunday Service Presents: A Beautiful 45; Ward and Al; What's So Funny?

=== Live ===
Best Taped Live Performance	Best Breakout Artist
**Rebecca Kohler** – **Winnipeg Comedy Festival**; John Hastings – Comedy Now!; Nathan Macintosh – Just for Laughs: All Access; Dave Merheje – Just for Laughs: All Access; Mark Forward – Just for Laughs: All Access	**Stacey McGunnigle**; Ali Hassan; Graham Kay; Jeff Elliott; Mike Delamont
Best Male Stand-up	Best Female Stand-up
**Steve Patterson**; Mark Forward; Pete Zedlacher; Peter Anthony; Ron Sparks	**Sara Hennessey**; DeAnne Smith; Heidi Foss; Laurie Elliott; Rebecca Kohler
Best Male Improviser	Best Female Improviser
**Jason DeRosse**; Alastair Forbes; Mark Meer; Ryan Beil; Taz VanRassel	**Jan Caruana**; Ashley Botting; Caitlin Howden; Carly Heffernan; Stacey McGunnigle
Best Sketch Troupe	Best Improv Troupe
**Peter n' Chris**; British Teeth; Ladystache; The Sketchersons; Tony Ho	**Mantown**; Bad Dog Repertory Players; Hip.Bang!; The Harold of Galactus; The Sunday Service
Best One Person Show	Best Comedic Play, Revue or Series
**Classy Lady** (Note: Classy Lady is the one-person show of Sandra Battaglini.); Desperate Church Wives; Nonna's Party; Significant Me – The ONEymoon is Over; The Amazing Bunni Lady Magician	**Rapp Battlez!**; Live Wrong and Prosper; Of Mice and Morro and Jasp; Peter n' Chris and the Mystery of the Hungry Heart Motel; Throne of Games

=== Television and Internet ===
Best TV Show	Best Web Series
Tie: **Mr. D** and **This Hour Has 22 Minutes** (season 20); Crown the Town with Ryan Long; Seed; The Ron James Show – season 4	**Space Janitors**; Dad Drives; Guidance; Sexy Nerd Girl; The Casting Room

=== Special awards ===
Dave Broadfoot Award	Phil Hartman Award
**Robin Duke**	**Mike MacDonald**
Roger Abbott Award
**Angela Martin**

== Multiple wins ==
The following people, shows, films, etc. received multiple awards

Awards	Person or work
2	Dad Drives
2	Mr. D
2	My Awkward Sexual Adventure

== Multiple nominations ==
The following people, shows, films, etc. received multiple nominations

Nominations	Person or work
6	My Awkward Sexual Adventure
6	Please Kill Mr. Know It All
5	Dead Before Dawn 3D
5	Seed
4	Mark Little
4	Mr. D
4	Space Janitors
3	Steve Patterson
2	Comedy Bar
2	Gary Rideout Jr.
2	Mark Farrell
2	Pat Thornton
2	Ron Sparks
2	This Hour Has 22 Minutes
