= Angelo Tsarouchas =

Canadian comedian (born 1964)

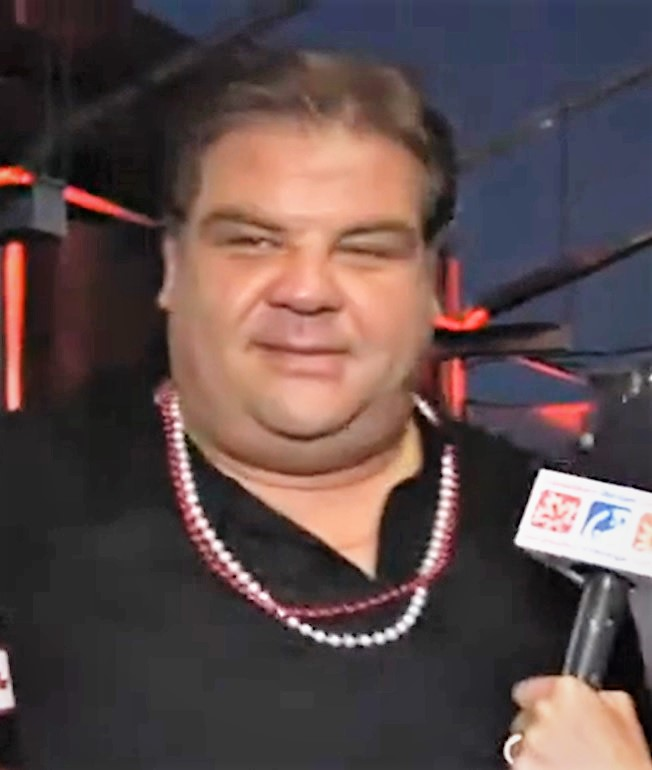
- Tsarouchas interviewed on Canada Day 2011
- Born: Evangelos Petros Tsarouchas; June 22, 1964 (age 62); Montreal, Quebec, Canada
- Years active: 1998–present

Angelo Tsarouchas (Greek: Άγγελος Τσαρούχας) is a Greek-Canadian comedian, actor, and writer living in Los Angeles. He is known for incorporating Greek culture into his stand-up comedy routines, and has been called the "King of Greek Ethnic Comedy." He organized World Dafni Day, a celebration of Greek diaspora from Dafni, his father's birthplace.

== Career ==
Angelo Tsarouchas was born in Montreal to Greek immigrant parents. Tsarouchas' father was from Sparta, while his mother was from Mytilene. Tsarouchas learned Greek at an early age as a result of his mother's struggles with learning English. During high school, Tsarouchas performed comedy acts in variety shows.

Tsarouchas temporarily gave up his dreams of becoming a comedian when he married his first wife, because she did not believe in pursuing a career in comedy. He founded several small businesses including a restaurant, a travel agency and a bowling alley. After his first marriage ended, Tsarouchas' business dissolved and he was left with only $900 to his name. He decided to drive from Ottawa to Toronto, where he began pursuing a career in comedy.

During his early years as a comedian, he performed in small comedy clubs like Yuk Yuk's. His stand-up comedy began to gain critical praise in the early 2000s, when Tsarouchas toured Canada and the United States. Tsarouchas has performed at various comedy tours and festivals, including the Wild West Comedy Show: 30 Days and 30 Nights – Hollywood to the Heartland, the Russell Peters World Tour, Edinburgh Festival Fringe, and the Just for Laughs festival. He starred in the comedy specials Still Hungry, It's All Greek to Me and Bigger is Better.

Much of his stand-up routines center on his experiences as a part of the Greek diaspora, and he is known for his distinctive style of observational humor. He played Detective Muldoon the children's mystery show The Mystery Files of Shelby Woo from 1996 to 1999.

He starred as Vinnie D'Angelo in the 2011 comedy film Fred and Vinnie opposite Fred Stoller. He won "Best Actor Award" for the role at the London Greek Film Festival, and was nominated for "Best Actor" at the 14th Canadian Comedy Awards.

Tsarouchas produced the documentary Back to Sparta, about his experiences returning to Sparta, where his father's family originated.

In 2016, Tsarouchas had the idea of organizing a festival in Dafni, Laconia to celebrate the Dafnian diaspora abroad. He also starred in 2017 along his fellow comedian Russell Peters in small role in The Indian Detective in episode 1 as an informant in car.

The first World Dafni Day was celebrated on August 15, 2019, and brought around 2,000 visitors to the village of 900 people.

== Personal life ==
Tsarouchas became engaged to Armenian-American businesswoman Alina Basil in 2009. The couple married and has a daughter.
