= The Last Homecoming =

- Film poster
- Directed by: Corinna Avraamidou
- Written by: Corinna Avraamidou
- Produced by: Kyriakos Tofarides
- Starring: Christodoulos Martas; Christopher Greco; Maria Kitsou; Popi Avraam; Stavros Louras
- Cinematography: Constandinos Othonos
- Edited by: Marios Piperidis
- Music by: Costas Cacoyannis
- Distributed by: Avra Productions Ltd.
- Release date: 5 December 2008
- Running time: 85 minutes
- Country: Cyprus
- Language: Greek

The Last Homecoming (Greek: Ο Τελευταίος Γυρισμός; O teleftaios gyrismos) is a 2008 drama film written and directed by Cypriot director Corinna Avraamidou. It is Avraamidou's first feature film. The film is set on Cyprus during the summer of 1974, when Turkey invaded Cyprus, and follows the romantic and political relations of a Greek Cypriot family.

== Plot ==
Orestes (Christodoulos Martas) and his fiancée Alexandra (Maria Kitsou) travel from Greece to Cyprus to visit Orestes's family in the summer of 1974. Orestes's brother Stefanos (Christopher Greco) and Alexandra, who are both involved in the Enosis movement become attracted to each other. When Stefanos is captured, Manolis (Stavros Louras), who still loves Stefanos' mother Phaedra (Popi Avraam), helps him escape the Kyrenia Castle, but is himself killed. The film ends with Orestes discovering Alexandra lying in Stefanos' arms, and the beginning of the Turkish invasion of Cyprus.

== Awards ==
The Last Homecoming won the award for Best Feature Film at the 2009 London Greek Film Festival.

== Cast ==
- Christodoulos Martas as Orestes
- Christopher Greco as Stefanos
- Maria Kitsou as Alexandra
- Popi Avraam as Phaedra
- Stavros Louras as Manolis
