= Belinda Montgomery =

Canadian-American actress

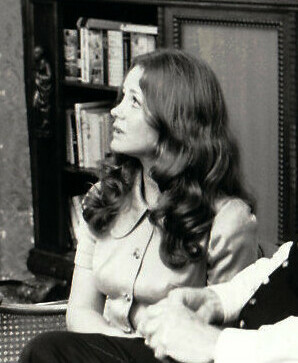
- Montgomery in a 1972 episode of The Men: Assignment Vienna
- Born: July 23, 1950 (age 76); Winnipeg, Manitoba, Canada
- Other name: Belinda J. Montgomery
- Occupation: Actress
- Years active: 1967–present
- Known for: The Other Side of the Mountain; Man from Atlantis; Doogie Howser, M.D.; Tron: Legacy; Days of Our Lives
- Spouse: Jeff Stillman
- Relatives: Lee Harcourt Montgomery (brother); Tannis G. Montgomery (sister)
- Website: belindamontgomery.com

Belinda Montgomery (born July 23, 1950) is a Canadian-American actress. She initially attracted notice for playing Cinderella in the 1969 television film Hey, Cinderella! She appeared in films including The Todd Killings (1971), The Other Side of the Mountain (1975) and its sequel The Other Side of the Mountain Part 2 (1978), Stone Cold Dead (1979), and Silent Madness (1984). She starred as Dr. Elizabeth Merrill in the science-fiction series Man from Atlantis (1977–78), and in the medical comedy-drama series, Doogie Howser, M.D. (1989–1993), as Katherine Howser, Doogie's mother.

== Life and career ==
Montgomery was born in Winnipeg, Manitoba on July 23, 1950. She is the daughter of actor Cecil Montgomery. Her siblings are actor Lee Harcourt Montgomery and actress Tannis G. Montgomery. She began acting in teen roles, including the 1967 family series Barney Boomer, and 1969 television special Hey, Cinderella! playing the role of Cinderella.

During the 1970s, Montgomery played many leading roles in made-for-television movies, including D.A.: Conspiracy to Kill (1971), Lock, Stock and Barrel (1971), The Bravos (1972), Women in Chains (1972), and The Devil's Daughter (1973). She made her big screen debut in the 1971 thriller film The Todd Killings opposite Robert F. Lyons. She later starred in the romantic drama film The Other Side of the Mountain (1975) and its sequel The Other Side of the Mountain Part 2 (1978), and the crime dramas Breaking Point (1976) and Stone Cold Dead (1979). In 1984, she starred in the slasher film Silent Madness.

In the early 1970s, Montgomery began to be credited as Belinda J. Montgomery. As she explained in October 1977 to Indianapolis News columnist Richard K. Shull:

I was told five years ago, If I kept my name as it was, I would have lots of accidents, I'd be accident prone. I had a lot of brushes with accidents – landing gear collapsing on an airplane – so I added my middle initial and things have been better. It's in the numerology.

Montgomery starred alongside Patrick Duffy in the short-lived NBC science fiction series Man from Atlantis from 1977 to 1978. In 1988, she starred in another short-lived NBC series, Aaron's Way. From 1989 to 1993, she starred as Katherine Howser, Doogie's mother, in the ABC medical comedy-drama series, Doogie Howser, M.D.. Montgomery also had a recurring role on Miami Vice, and has made over 80 guest appearances on television, including appearances on Ironside, T. J. Hooker, Dynasty, The Love Boat, Murder, She Wrote, L.A. Law, JAG, Mannix, Magnum, P.I., The Sixth Sense, The Virginian and Ghost Whisperer, among other series. Her recent credits include 2010 action film Tron: Legacy and 2017 Lifetime Christmas romantic comedy Snowed-Inn Christmas.

In March 2013, writing under the pen name B. Montgomery, Montgomery submitted a short story "St. Patrick of the Pineapple" to Midlife Collage, an online writing contest, and won first place.

== Filmography ==
=== Film ===
Year	Title	Role
1971	The Todd Killings	Roberta
1975	The Other Side of the Mountain	Audra Jo Nicholson
1976	Breaking Point	Diana McBain
1978	The Other Side of the Mountain Part 2	Audra Jo Nicholson
1979	Stone Cold Dead	Sandy MacAuley
1984	Silent Madness	Dr. Joan Gilmore
1983	Uncommon Valor	Joan
1998	Phantom Town	Mom
2000	The Scarecrow	Polly
2001	Camouflage	Diane
2010	Tron: Legacy	Grandma Flynn

=== Television ===
Year	Title	Role
1967	Barney Boomer	Susan
1969	CBS Playhouse	Eula
1969	The Virginian	Peg Halstead
1969–1975	Marcus Welby, M.D.	Mary Ann Graham
1969–1975	Medical Center	Currie, Joyce / Janet / Melanie Toland / Eunice
1970	Hey, Cinderella!	Cinderella
1970	Ritual of Evil	Loey Wiley
1970	Paris 7000	
1970	Ironside	Marla Cardwell
1970	Matt Lincoln	Nina
1971	D.A.: Conspiracy To Kill	Luanne Gibson
1971	Alias Smith and Jones	Penelope Roach
1971	Lock, Stock and Barrel	Roselle Bridgeman
1971	Owen Marshall: Counselor at Law	
1971–1972	The F.B.I.	Margo Bengston
1972	The Bravos	Heller Chase
1972	The Sixth Sense	Tina Norris
1972	Women in Chains	Melinda Carr
1972	Assignment Vienna	Julie Hayes
1972	Cannon	Anne
1972	Mannix	Susan Graham
1972	The Rookies	Laurie
1973	The Devil's Daughter	Diane Shaw
1973	Crime Club	Anne Dryden
1973	Barnaby Jones	Amy Partridge
1973	Letters from Three Lovers	Angela "Angie" Mason
1973–1975	The Streets of San Francisco	Karen Pearson / Susan Howard
1974	The New Land	Danika (episode "The Word is: Alternative")
1974	Petrocelli	Barbara
1976	City of Angels	
1976	Insight	Roseanne
1976	Gibbsville	
1977	Westside Medical	
1977	Nashville 99	Summer
1977	Kingston: Confidential	
1977	Most Wanted	
1977	The Hostage Heart	Fiona
1977	Quincy, M.E.	Bonnie DeMarco
1977–1978	Man from Atlantis	Dr. Elizabeth Merrill (series co-star)
1978	Lou Grant	Carol
1978	Blackout	Annie Gallo
1978	Sword of Justice	Julie Lang
1979	Murder In Music City	Peggy Ann West
1979	How the West Was Won	Florrie
1979	Marciano	Barbara Marciano
1979	Eischied	
1980	Fantasy Island	
1980	Turnover Smith	Kelly
1980	Trouble In High Timber County	Carrie Yeager
1980	Trapper John, M.D.	Darby
1981	Concrete Cowboys	Janine
1981	The Misadventures of Sheriff Lobo	
1981–1982	The Love Boat	Karen Singer / Valerie Singer
1982	Dynasty	Jennifer Brighton ("The Baby", "Mother and Son")
1982	CHiPs	Elaine Price
1982	Bare Essence	Melody
1982–1986	Simon & Simon	Laura Steubens Dennison / Sherry Dayton / Joyce Dolan / Dorrie Wilson
1983	Tell Me That You Love Me	Lenora
1983	Whiz Kids	Judy Hubbard
1984	Blue Thunder	Dr. Nell Lindsay
1984	Lottery!	
1984	Magnum, P.I.	Fran "Frannie" Huddle
1984	T. J. Hooker	Dr. Sandy Roberts / Laura Dietrich
1984–1989	Miami Vice	Caroline Crockett / Caroline Ballard
1985	Murder, She Wrote	Pamela Crane
1985	Riptide	Rainey
1985	Street Hawk	Stefanie Craig
1985	The Hitchhiker	Carla Magnuson
1985	Finder of Lost Loves	Lisa Hennessey
1985–1986	Crazy Like a Fox	Kelly Aspen
1986	Dalton: Code of Vengeance II	Libby
1986	Stark: Mirror Image	Claire Graves
1986	Adam: His Song Continues	Myra Schimdbauer
1986–1987	Days of Our Lives	Sylvie Gallagher
1987	Danger Bay	Dr. Pam Summer
1987	Stone Fox	Doc Smith
1988	Aaron's Way	Sarah Miller
1989	In the Heat of the Night	Nora Womack
1989–1993	Doogie Howser, M.D.	Katharine Howser
1990	Casey's Gift: For Love of A Child	Terry Ctilwell
1993	L.A. Law	Jessica Wilton
1995	Burke's Law	Kelly Peterson
1996	Life Happens	Molly Stewart
1996	Promised Land	Lisa Smith
1996	Mr. & Mrs. Smith	Amy Pitzer
1997	Beyond Belief: Fact or Fiction	Alison Fender
1998	Dirty Little Secret	Gina
1999	Hope Island	Jo Summers
2002	JAG	Captain Fryer, Harm's Aviation Expert
2005	Ghost Whisperer	Ursula Hilliard
2017	Snowed-Inn Christmas	Carol Winters
2019	Radio Christmas	Mary Lou
