= London Greek Film Festival =

The London Greek Film Festival is an international film festival focusing on Greek films and Greek filmmakers.

Held every October in London, the festival is open to films either by Greek filmmakers or set in Greece or involving Greek history or mythology. The festival was founded in 2007.

The festival's artistic director is Christos Prosylis.

In 2013, Lizz Njagah won the best actress award for her performance in “The Return of Lazarus”, directed by her husband, Alexandros Konstantaras.

In 2025, Best Fiction Film Acting Code Award was awarded to the film The Aegean directed by Jacob Richardson in 2024.

== Odysseus awards ==
=== Awards fiction feature films ===
| Season | Best Movie | Director | Sources |
|---|---|---|---|
| 2020 | Exile (2019 film) (2nd Award for Feature Fiction Film) | Vassilis Mazomenos | |
| 2017 | Lines (film) (2nd Award for Feature Fiction Film) | Vassilis Mazomenos | |
| 2015 | Invisible (Αόρατος) | Dimitris Athanitis | |
| 2014 | Pandemy (Πανδημία) | Dimitris Piatas | |
| 2013 | 10th day (δέκατη μέρα) | Vassilis Mazomenos | |
| 2012 | Fred and Vinnie (USA film) | Steve Skrovan | |
| 2012 | Guilt (2009 film) (Best Photography, Best Screenwriting) | Vassilis Mazomenos | |
| 2011 | Riders of Pylos (Ιππείς της Πύλου) | Nikos Kalogeropoulos | |
| 2010 | The Building Manager (Ο διαχειριστής) | Periklis Horsolgou | |
| 2009 | The Last Homecoming (Ο τελευταίος γυρισμός) | Korinna Avraamidou | |
| 2008 | Eduart | Angeliki Antoniou | |

=== Multiple award winners ===
- Vassilis Mazomenos (2012, 2013, 2017,2020)
