= Stacey McGunnigle =

21st-century Canadian actress and comedian

Stacey McGunnigle (born 1985-1986) is a Canadian actress and comedian, most noted as a cast member of the sketch comedy series This Hour Has 22 Minutes since October 2021.

== Early life ==
Originally from Alliston, Ontario, McGunnigle first became known as a member of The Second City's national touring company in the early 2010s. In 2012, she joined the mainstage troupe for the first time as a cast member in We've Totally (probably) Got This!. She was the winner of the Canadian Comedy Award for Best Breakout Artist at the 14th Canadian Comedy Awards in 2013, and was a nominee for Best Female Improviser both in 2013 and at the 13th Canadian Comedy Awards in 2012.

== Career ==
In 2014 she was cast in the American sitcom pilot Ellen More or Less, although the show was not picked up to series.

She has also had a regular supporting role in the CBC Gem children's series Detention Adventure, and appeared in episodes of Roast Battle Canada, competing against Hannan Younis in the second episode and against Alan Shane Lewis in the eighth.

In 2025, McGunnigle appeared in a recurring role in the Prime Video series Gen V.

== Filmography ==
Year	Title	Role	Notes
2011	InSecurity	Cute girl	Episode: "El Negotiator"
2011	Ryan & Ally	Laura	Short film
2012	Space Janitors	Princess	Guest
2012	The Palace	Girl	Short film
2014	Arranged	Anne Blythe	Short film
2015	Ellen More or Less	Ellen	Unaired pilot
2015	Odd Squad	Puppet Master	2 episodes
2017	Must Kill Karl	Molly	Short film
2017	Come to Bed	Claire	Short film, also writer and producer
2017	Privilege	Claire	Short film, also writer and producer
2017	One Afternoon	Denise	Short film, also writer and producer
2018	No Sleep 'Til Christmas	Kristina	Television Film
2019	Pete Samcras	Mom, Woman 2	Episodes: "What Parenting Sounds Like to Non Parents" & "Lil Shouty"
2021	Private Eyes	Sandra	Episode: "Blueprint for Murder"
2022	Doomlands	Ms Taste	Episode: "Tastes of the Wastes"
2019-2022	Detention Adventure	Miss Marner	Series regular
2022–present	This Hour Has 22 Minutes	Writer, Performer	Season 30 and Season 31 Episode 1, also producer
2025	Gen V	Stacy Ferrera	3 episodes
2025-2026	The Tom Henry Show	Herself	2 episodes
