= Rebecca Kohler =

Canadian stand-up comedian

Rebecca Kohler is a Canadian stand-up comedian, whose comedy album In Living Kohler received a Juno Award nomination for Comedy Album of the Year at the Juno Awards of 2018.

Kohler was a competitor in SiriusXM Canada's Top Comics competition in 2015.

In addition to her performing career, she has been a television writer for shows such as Workin' Moms, Schitt's Creek, Kim's Convenience, The Ron James Show, Spun Out and This Hour Has 22 Minutes.

In 2013, Kohler won a Canadian Comedy Award for Best Taped Live Performance for her show at the Winnipeg Comedy Festival. She was also nominated that year for Best Radio Program or Clip for The Debaters. Kohler was nominated for Best Female Stand-up in 2013 and 2014.
