= The Right Way (2004 film) =

2004 film by Mark Penney

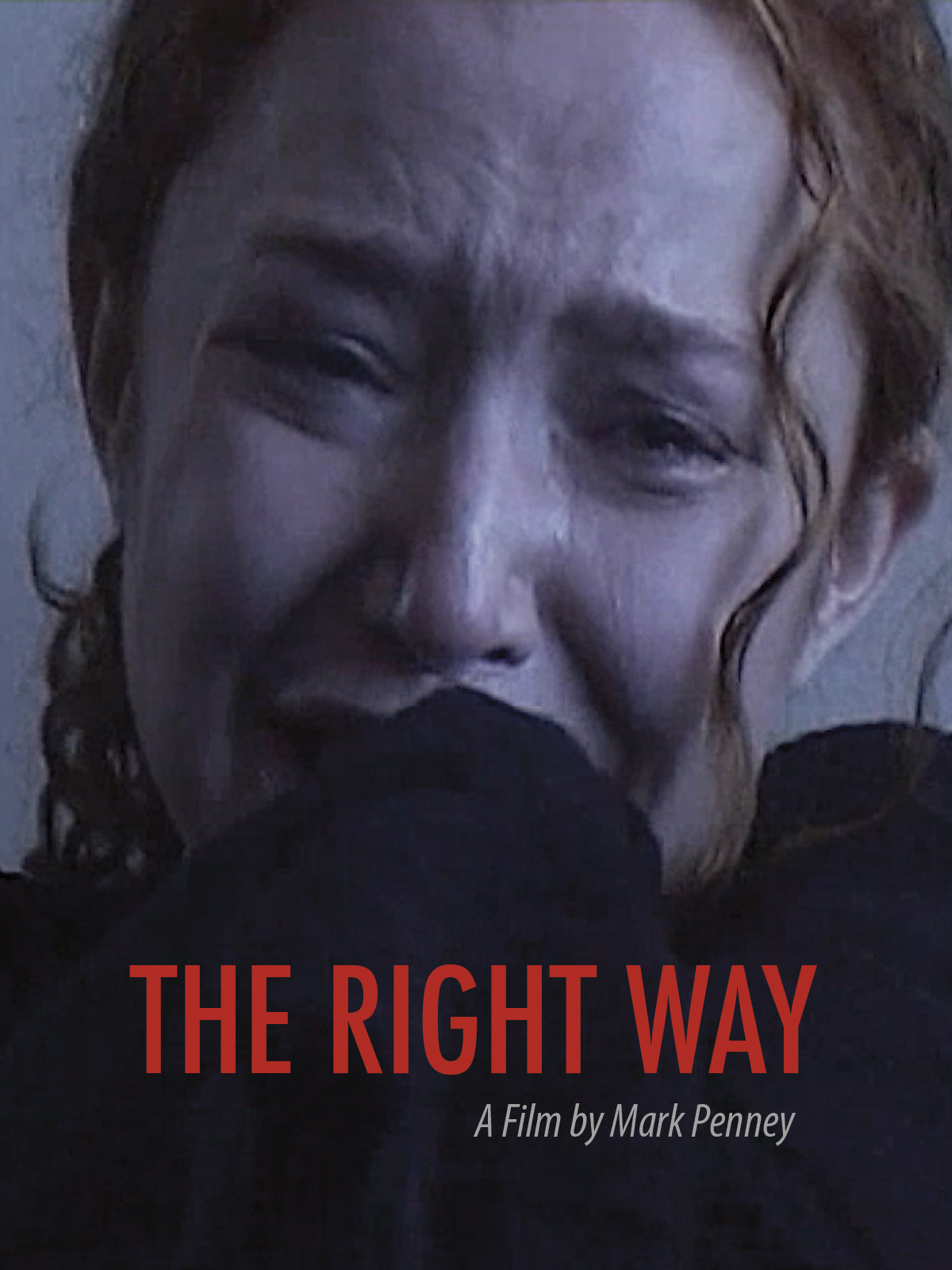
- Directed by: Mark Penney
- Written by: Mark Penney
- Produced by: Mark Penney; Ryan Penney
- Starring: Karyn Dwyer; Jefferson Brown; James McGowan; Sarain Boylan; Keir Gilchrist
- Cinematography: Mark Penney
- Edited by: Kevin Rollins
- Release date: September 4, 2004 (Venice)
- Running time: 77 minutes
- Country: Canada
- Language: English
- Box office: $323,155

The Right Way is a 2004 Canadian film directed by Mark Penney. It tells the story of Amy and David two young people from suburbia, whose lives are going nowhere, when they meet their relationship alters their lives forever and sends them surreal and existential crisis. The Right Way was an Official Selection of the 2004 Venice Film Festival and had a limited theatrical release in the United States in December 2005, it was released to video on demand services in 2010.

The film was shot in Brampton, Ontario.

== Critical reception ==
A review in The Globe and Mail called The Right Way, "an old-fashioned, grim Canadian movie" that "despite its paramount flows... marks the birth of a promising young director." The reviewer for the National Post wrote that despite the fact that the "message is powerful and the production values fantastic (the film was shot for $10,000 but looks like it cost at least 10 times as much), The Right Way suffers from thinly developed characters... and a railroad-straight plot.

== Cast ==
- Karyn Dwyer - Amy
- Jefferson Brown - David
- Gloria Slade - Amy's Mom
- James McGowan - Dad
- Holly Dennison - Mom
- Sarain Boylan - Lori
- Keir Gilchrist - Young David
