= Barney Boomer =

Canadian children's television series

- Genre: Children's series
- Written by: Ron Krantz
- Directed by: Flemming Nielsen
- Starring: John Clayton
- Country of origin: Canada
- Original language: English

Production
- Producers: Stu Gilchrist; Herb Roland
- Running time: 20 minutes

Original release
- Network: CBC Television
- Release: 12 September 1967 – 9 January 1968

Barney Boomer is a Canadian children's television series that aired on CBC Television for part of the 1967––1968 programming season. Vancouver actor John Clayton portrayed the title character.

== Production ==
The programme was produced under the network's Schools and Youth division and filmed on location in Oakville, Ontario. The series aired four days per week from Tuesdays through Fridays as a replacement for Razzle Dazzle. Each episode aired from 16:30 Toronto time for 20 minutes followed by a short quiz show, Swingaround, which completed the half-hour time slot.

In January 1968, Barney Boomer was replaced by Upside Town, a series which retained most of the cast but with a reformulated premise which gave more emphasis to characters other than Barney. Lynne Gorman did not continue her role as Florence Kozy; her character was performed by Pam Hyatt in the new series.

== Premise ==
Barney Boomer is a 21-year-old sailor who has docked his houseboat at Sixteen Harbour, in the fictional town of Cedarville, intending to meet his uncle (Rex Sevenoaks), a captain who lived in a lighthouse. Barney intended the stay at Cedarville to be brief, due to his plans to navigate the Great Lakes. However, he meets Florence Kozy (Lynne Gorman), who persuades him to establish a business in the town.

== Cast ==
- John Clayton – Barney Boomer
- Lynne Gorman – Florence Kozy
- Franz Russell – Councillor Edgar Q. Russell
- Trudy Young – Trudy
- Rex Sevenoaks – Captain Boomer
- Claire Drainie – Ma Parkin
- Claude Rae – Mr. Andrews
- Gerard Parkes – Sam Oliver
- Belinda Montgomery – Susan
