= The Todd Killings =

1971 film by Barry Shear

- film poster
- Directed by: Barry Shear
- Written by: Dennis Murphy; Joel Oliansky
- Produced by: Barry Shear
- Starring: Robert F. Lyons; Richard Thomas; Belinda Montgomery; James Broderick; Gloria Grahame; Holly Near; Edward Asner; Barbara Bel Geddes
- Cinematography: Harold E. Stine
- Edited by: Walter Thompson
- Music by: Leonard Rosenman
- Production company: National General Pictures
- Distributed by: National General Pictures
- Release date: October 20, 1971 (U.S.)
- Running time: 93 minutes
- Country: United States
- Language: English

The Todd Killings is a 1971 psychological thriller directed by Barry Shear and starring Robert F. Lyons, Richard Thomas, Belinda Montgomery, and Barbara Bel Geddes. It is based on the true crimes of serial killer Charles Schmid in the 1960s.

== Plot ==
The film is based on the real-life murders committed by Charles E. "Smitty" Schmid, Jr. in Tucson. Schmid, a would-be musician, murdered one teenage girl in May 1964 and two others in August 1965. Two of Schmid's friends helped him bury his first victim. Billy Roy, a friend of Schmid, helped lead police to Schmid as the killer.

In August 1966, Schmid was convicted of first-degree murder and sentenced to death. His May 1967 trial for an additional murder was terminated when he pled guilty to second-degree murder, even though the girl's body had not been recovered. Schmid led police to her body in June 1967, but always maintained that he was innocent of the murders. His case became famous nationwide and was highly publicized due to his popularity with and influence over a large number of local teenagers. Schmid died in March 1975 after being attacked by two other inmates in the Arizona State Penitentiary.

== Cast ==
- Robert F. Lyons as Skipper Todd
- Richard Thomas as Billy Roy
- Belinda Montgomery as Roberta
- Barbara Bel Geddes as Mrs. Todd
- James Broderick as Sam Goodwin
- Gloria Grahame as Mrs. Roy
- Harry Lauter as Mr. Roy
- Holly Near as Norma
- Ed Asner as Fred Reardon
- Jason Wingreen as Policeman
- Fay Spain as Mrs. Mack
- Michael Conrad as Detective Shaw
- Meg Foster as Waitress

== Release ==
The film was released theatrically in the United States by National General Pictures on October 20, 1971. The film was banned in Thailand, due to the film depicting "a lifestyle of young American men and women in which they seek happiness through illegal methods, including drugs and the use of drugs to arouse illicit sexual feelings, that violate the beautiful morality and culture of the Thai."

== Home media ==
The film was released on VHS by Warner Home Video in December 1988. It was released on DVD in 2010.

== Reception ==
Amy Longsdorf wrote in The Record that "for an exploitation quickie from the early '70s, this grubby crime thriller casts a strange spell. Skipper Todd, a drug dealer and small-town lothario takes the notion of lady-killing a bit too literally; the film pulses to a very menacing beat."

Film critic Howard Thompson said that the "brilliance of producer Shear's direction and Stine's photography, and the subtle meshing of the incidents make for an engrossing, often gripping eyeful; horror and sex are actually soft-pedaled; nonetheless, the film is anything but dull."

== See also ==
- List of American films of 1971
