= Breaking Point (1976 film) =

1976 American film by Bob Clark

- Directed by: Bob Clark
- Written by: Stanley Mann; Roger Swaybill
- Produced by: Bob Clark; Harold Greenberg; Claude Héroux; Alfred Pariser
- Starring: Bo Svenson; Robert Culp; Belinda Montgomery
- Cinematography: Marc Champion
- Edited by: Stan Cole
- Music by: David McLey
- Production company: Astral Bellevue Pathe
- Distributed by: Astral Films (Canada); 20th Century Fox (United States)
- Release date: June 2, 1976
- Running time: 93 minutes
- Countries: Canada; United States
- Language: English

Breaking Point is a 1976 Canadian-American crime drama film starring Bo Svenson, and featuring Robert Culp in a supporting role, produced and directed by Bob Clark.

== Plot ==
Former Marine and Judo instructor Michael McBain witnesses a murder. Initially reluctant to identify the two culprits, he is eventually persuaded by Lieutenant Frank Sirriani, who believes their trial will lead to the arrest of Vincent Karbone, a construction magnate in Philadelphia and suspected leader of one of the city's most notorious Mafia gangs. McBain testifies despite intimidation; however, to Sirriani's surprise, the defendants refuse to name Karbone and reject a plea-bargain.

McBain and his family try to return to their ordinary lives. Instead, Karbone plans to kill McBain and his family, who are all put into witness protection (a program that was newly introduced in the US in 1971) and moved to Toronto. The family's new identity is compromised, though. Learning of his sister Diana's fiancé Ted Buchanan's murder, McBain returns to Philadelphia to take on Karbone himself, eventually killing him and neutralizing the threat to his family's life.

== Cast ==
- Bo Svenson as Michael McBain
- Robert Culp as Frank Sirrianni
- John Colicos as Vincent Karbone
- Belinda Montgomery as Diana McBain
- Linda Sorenson as Helen McBain
- Stephen Young as Peter Stratas
- Richard M. Davidson as Hirsch
- Alan McRae as Ted Buchanan
- Doug Lennox as Damoni
- Rob Ralph as Buck Durkin A line mate of Michael McBain on his hockey team

== Reception ==
Daily Grindhouse called the film "frequently dull, often sloppy, and absolute generic movie" that only becomes "serviceable" and "fun to watch" in the third and final act of the film.

== See also ==
- List of American films of 1976
