= Snowed-Inn Christmas =

American-Canadian romantic comedy film

- Official poster
- Screenplay by: Carley Smale
- Story by: Carley Smale
- Directed by: Gary Yates
- Starring: Bethany Joy Lenz; Andrew Walker; John B. Lowe; Belinda Montgomery; Tasha Smith
- Music by: Shawn Pierce
- Country of origin: Canada
- Original language: English

Production
- Executive producer: Howard Braunstein
- Producer: Juliette Hagopian
- Running time: 86 minutes
- Production companies: Julijette; Lifetime

Original release
- Network: Lifetime
- Release: December 16, 2017

Snowed-Inn Christmas is a 2017 American-Canadian made-for-television romantic comedy film directed by Gary Yates, from a screenplay by Carley Smale. Starring Bethany Joy Lenz and Andrew Walker, it premiered on 16 December 2017, on Lifetime.

== Plot ==
Two writers for a New York magazine, Jenna Hudson and Kevin Jenner, are given the task of writing an article on a resort in Aspen, Colorado, with the author of the piece that attracts the most clicks being given a promotion. Polar opposites, they make awkward travel companions. A snow storm forces their flight to be diverted to the small town of Santa Claus, Indiana. With no way to get to Aspen and no place to stay, they are taken up by Chris and Carol Winters, a local couple who enjoy portraying Santa Claus and Mrs. Claus during the holidays. The pair run a small bed and breakfast, the Winters Inn. Very old and quaint, the inn may not be around the following spring. The Winters say they have no deed to prove the inn's historical nature. Initially frustrated by being stuck in Indiana, Jenna and Kevin set upon the idea of writing about the inn where they are staying.

The two spend time together – including visiting Kevin's family, who happen to live an hour's drive away – and begin to warm to each other. Jenna researches an article on the inn's history: she discovers that a deed proving the inn's historicity exists, but is missing. In her search for the deed, she finds an old photo which makes her think that Chris could be Santa Claus.

On Christmas Eve, Kevin is preparing to tell Jenna that he loves her, when Jenna's ex-boyfriend Andrew arrives, and takes her to a hotel so they can fly out the next morning. This leaves Jenna unable to finish her article, but the next morning at the airport she discovers that Kevin has found the missing deed and written an article in both their names. As the flight is about to leave, Jenna realizes that Andrew is not right for her, and instead she goes to Kevin's family's house for Christmas, and the two declare their love for one another.

The edited version of the film ends with Jenna going back to join Kevin at his family home, but there is also a director's cut that carries the story forward one year to show Kevin and Jenna being married at the Winters Inn, with Chris Winters officiating.

== Cast ==
- Bethany Joy Lenz as Jenna Hudson (credited as Bethany Lenz)
- Andrew Walker as Kevin Jenner
- John B. Lowe as Christopher Winters/Santa
- Belinda Montgomery as Carol Winters/Mrs. Claus
- Tasha Smith as Simone Jenkins, Jenna and Kevin's boss
- Stephanie Moroz as Meagan Jenner, Kevin's sister
- Aaron Radwanski as Eric Craig, Kevin's brother-law
- Jefferson Brown as Andrew, Jenna's ex-boyfriend

== Conception and production ==
The concept for the story came to screenwriter Carley Smale while she was tossing ideas for titles around with a couple of friends. The phrase 'snowed-in' was mentioned. By adding another ‘n’ to the title, she combined the concept of being snow-bound with the idea of being stuck at an inn. Said Smale "The plot came easily for me once I had that title." As to writing for a Christmas themed production, Smale notes there are parameters to what the studios are looking for, but the fun is in the characters placed in the story. "There is a formula to it, but writing characters that have personalities and writing a story that keeps an audience engaged is not as simple as it may seem." In 2015 she penned the scripts for both Snowed-Inn Christmas and Christmas Pen Pals. Each ended up being accepted by Lifetime television and were turned into Christmas movies.

Smale's script for Snowed-Inn Christmas was approved in March 2017. The project was filmed in Winnipeg, Manitoba, Canada. Principal photography began in September. Artificial snow and Christmas decorations were brought in to transform the streets of Manitoba to the holiday season. Snowed-Inn Christmas was produced by Juliette Hagopian, with Howard Braunstein acting as executive producer.

Andrew Walker has completed a number of Christmas themed romantic comedies for Hallmark. He was under the impression Snowed-Inn Christmas would be another Hallmark movie. It was not until he was on set speaking with director Gary Yates that he realized he was actually on a Lifetime project. Walker confided he was happy for the opportunity to work with Lifetime.

Joy Lenz revealed the story line and set gave her the feeling of acting in "something that might have come from the Doris Day era", and that she was delighted with the prospect of doing an old-fashioned romantic comedy. Lenz asked the network to allow her and co-star Andrew Walker to create a music video for the movie, using the Lane and Freed song How About You? to reflect the 1950s feel of the story. Lifetime agreed, and the two created a song and dance video, which Lifetime released on YouTube five days before the premiere.

This was the first movie that Walker and Lenz worked on together, but along with director Gary Yates the three got along well. On the set Walker and Lenz were given license to rework scenes or craft completely new ones to give it more of a natural feel. Working off each other, Lenz and Walker would ad-lib and inject physical comedy into the story to create a more dynamic interaction between the characters. Walker took to calling Lenz 'Doc' because of her willingness to rework the script. "She should be a script doctor. She takes something good and makes it great." Smale was on set during production to help with extra dialogue for the characters. With 16 film credits for her writing, Smale noted this production had a spark of magic. "It definitely exceeded my expectations."

== Release and reception ==
The movie premiered on 16 December 2017, on Lifetime. The film was well received by its target audience, and has been ranked as a favorite Lifetime holiday movie. While noting the movie stays within a holiday rom-com formula, Jenna Guillaume of Junkee believed the film succeeded in its execution. In addition, Smale's Santa story avoided being "heavy-handed, instead functioning more as a vehicle to explore ~the spirit of Christmas~ and the romance of whimsy." The film was favored by its casting. Said J.C. Rissi: "The secret ingredient of Snowed-Inn Christmas is its cast. From their first lines of witty banter, to the last kiss, it’s clear these lead stars were going to play off each other with ease." Guillaume agreed, noting there is "a natural flow to their banter that is all-too-rare in these movies." Prasad Sumith of Cinemaholic noted Snowed-Inn Christmas depicted a truthful relationship, and portrayed the harmony and warmth encouraged by the Christmas season. "Even as a fictional account, ‘Snowed-Inn Christmas’ depicts a relationship that is very relatable. Jenna and Kevin are incredibly different from one another, but they develop a bond that gradually grows stronger. Such relationships are quite rooted in reality. Furthermore, the movie portrays the indisputable influence of Christmas in human lives, which encourages harmony and warmth. At its core, the movie tells a romantic tale that reflects reality but in the garb of fiction."
