= Man from Atlantis =

American science fiction television series

- Genre: Superhero
- Created by: Mayo Simon; Herbert F. Solow
- Written by: Mayo Simon (pilot)
- Directed by: Lee H. Katzin (pilot)
- Starring: Patrick Duffy; Belinda Montgomery; Alan Fudge
- Composer: Fred Karlin
- Country of origin: United States
- Original language: English
- No. of episodes: 13, plus four television films

Production
- Executive producer: Herbert F. Solow
- Running time: 42–44 minutes per episode
- Production company: Solow Production Company

Original release
- Network: NBC
- Release: March 4, 1977 – June 6, 1978

Man from Atlantis (Note: A number of sources prepend the word The to the title; however, the actual on-screen title of the series, plus the title used for spin-off novels and comic books, does not include the article.) is an American superhero television series that ran on the NBC network from 1977 to 1978. It began as four TV movies that aired in Spring 1977. The movies achieved high ratings which led to the commissioning of a weekly series for the 1977–78 season, but it was cancelled after 13 episodes due to a declining audience and high production costs.

== Series description ==
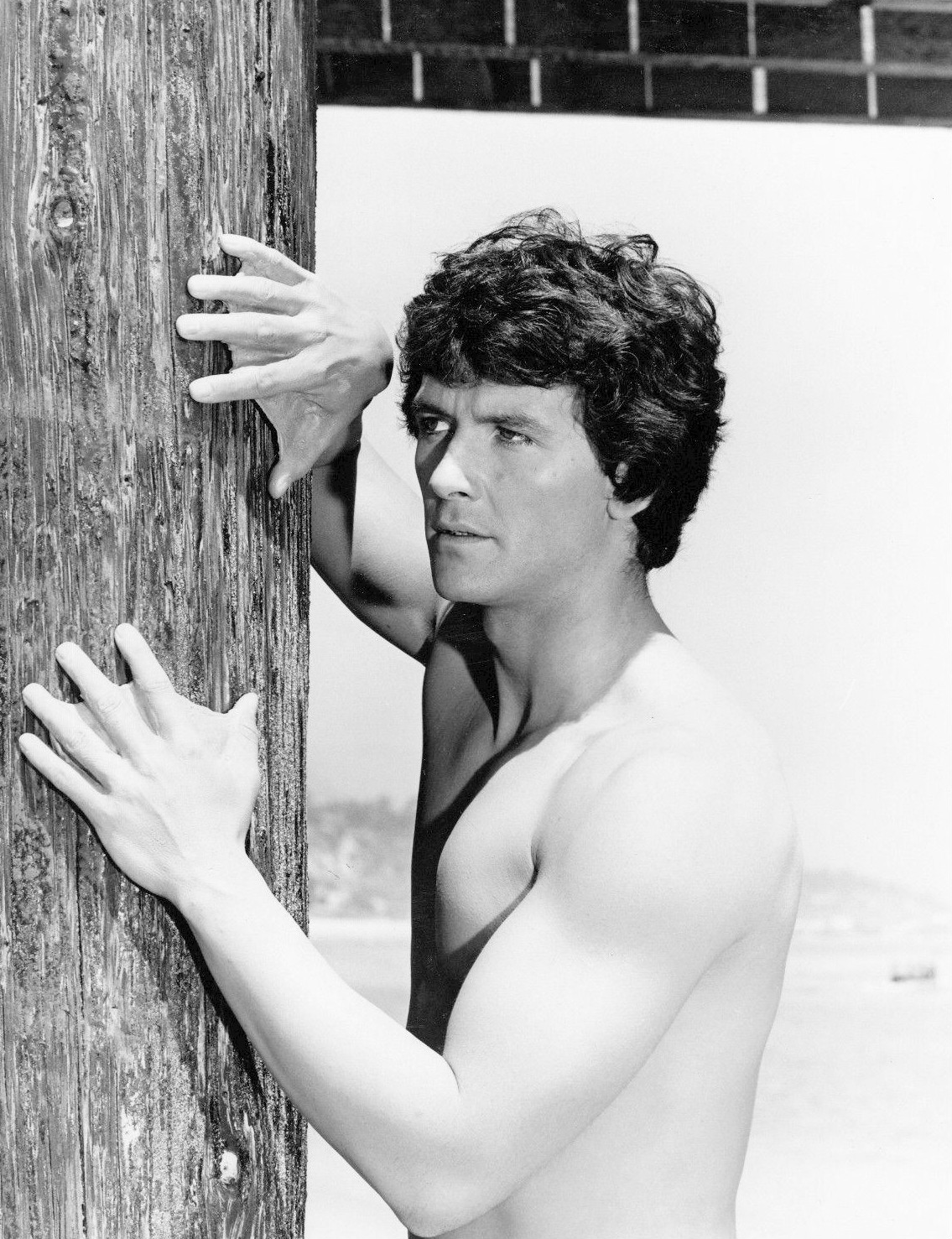
Patrick Duffy as Mark Harris in the television show's premiere.

The series stars Patrick Duffy as an injured amnesiac man found on a beach after a storm. He possesses exceptional abilities, including the ability to breathe underwater and withstand extreme depth pressures, the ability to understand cetaceans, and superhuman strength. His hands and feet are webbed, his eyes are unusually sensitive to light, and he swims using his arms and legs in a fashion similar to a dolphin kick. Dr. Elizabeth Merrill, working at the Naval Undersea Center, a US Navy research facility, is the first to realize his nature and helps him return to health. She enters all known data into a computer, which speculates that he is the "last citizen of Atlantis ? ? ?" Elizabeth names him Mark Harris. The admiral at NUC recruits Mark to search for a lost Navy submersible. Mark discovers and foils a plot by Mister Schubert to destroy surface civilization in a nuclear war. After the pilot, Mark and Elizabeth leave the Navy to join the Foundation for Oceanic Research, a quasi-governmental agency that conducts secret research and operates a large, sophisticated submarine, the Cetacean, originally owned by Schubert.

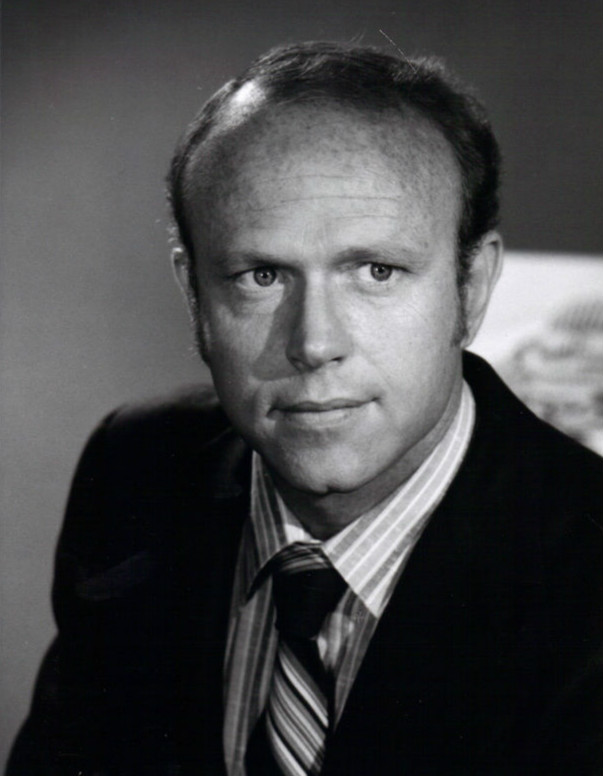
Alan Fudge as C. W. Crawford Jr.

The tone of the weekly series shifted away from the relatively serious science fiction tone of the TV movies and further into escapist fantasy, not too dissimilar to Star Trek with Mark as the adventurer captain of the Cetacean like Captain Kirk was of the USS Enterprise (Man from Atlantis producer and co-creator Herbert Solow was one of the people responsible for bringing Star Trek to the screen in the 1960s). In several episodes, Mark would swim through portals in the ocean that led to other places and even other times. In one episode, he crossed into a world set in the 19th century wild west where he met his twin, in another he entered a world inhabited by aliens, and he even travelled to 16th century Verona, Italy where he met the characters of Romeo and Juliet. No explanation was given to how these worlds existed via the ocean. As the scripts became increasingly "sillier" (Duffy himself later likened the series to the campy 60's TV series Batman), Montgomery's scientist character became more sidelined and the actress managed to get out of her contract with the help of lawyers after 11 episodes. In the 12th episode, a new female lead character, Dr. Jenny Reynolds (played by Lisa Blake Richards) briefly replaced Elizabeth Merrill. However, the last episode did not feature any female lead character. Producer Herbert Solow also cast his then-wife Pamela Peters Solow, who was twenty years his junior, in the show twice. She first appeared in the fourth TV movie "The Disappearances", and then again (as a different character) in the ninth episode of the series, "C.W. Hyde". On both occasions she was given the prestigious screen billing of "and Pamela Peters Solow as...." despite being a relative unknown.

== Cast ==
- Patrick Duffy as Mark Harris
- Belinda J. Montgomery as Dr. Elizabeth Merrill, a marine biologist, originally with the Naval Undersea Center and later the Foundation for Oceanic Research.
- Alan Fudge as C.W. Crawford, administrator of the Foundation for Oceanic Research.
- Victor Buono as Mr. Schubert. Originally in the pilot, Schubert was an amoral man who thought human society was fatally flawed and wanted to create an undersea utopia after inciting a nuclear apocalypse on the surface, similar to Stromberg in the James Bond film The Spy Who Loved Me, also from 1977. When Schubert was reintroduced in the series, he became a stereotypical villain interested only in achieving wealth and power.
- Kenneth Tigar appeared in the second, third, and fourth movies as Dr Miller Simon, scientific director of the Foundation for Oceanic Research
- Fred Beir appeared in the third and fourth films as Captain Bracy, commanding officer of the Cetacean.
- Richard Laurance Williams as Jomo, helmsman of the Cetacean in the series
- J. Victor Lopez as Chuey, a Cetacean bridge crewman in the series
- Jean Marie Hon as Jane Bryan, Cetacean communications officer in the series
- Anson Downes as a Cetacean crewman in the series

== Production ==
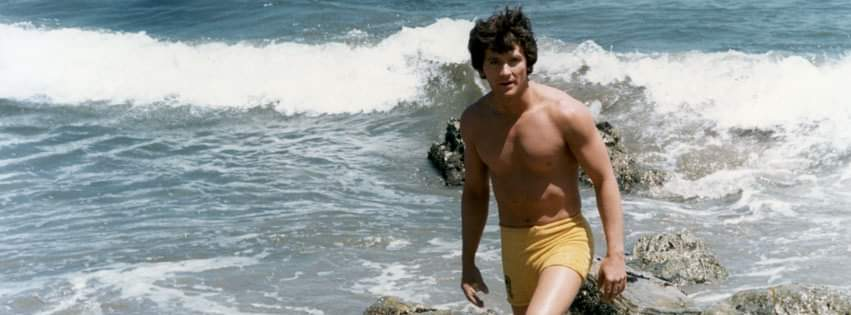
Mark Harris

The show was produced by Herbert Franklin Solow's studio Solow Production Company, a company spun off from the live-action arm of American animation studio Hanna-Barbera Productions. The Foundation for Oceanic Research headquarters building was represented by the Point Fermin lighthouse in San Pedro, California.

The Cetacean submarine's voyages were shown through miniature work by the special effects team of Gene Warren. While the TV movies reused Cetacean docking footage from the pilot, the series introduced new sequences with a Seabase featuring a moving cradle and an enclosed walkway for the submersible to avoid having to create diving and surfacing effects.

== Critical reaction ==
Critic Tom Shales, reviewing the show for the Washington Post, opined that "kids may be impressed" by the heroics and special effects, but the show lacked "adult appeal" and that the stories would "soon wear thinner than water".

The New York Times harshly criticized the campy aspects of the series, "The Man From Atlantis may be clever enough to realize that when project is launched on a foolish idea, one solution is merely to escalate the foolishness."

Academic Nick Stember wrote that in 2014 the series "is almost entirely forgotten in the US".

== Episodes ==
=== Television movies ===
No.	Title	Directed by	Written by	Original release date
M1	Man from Atlantis	Lee H. Katzin	Mayo Simon	March 4, 1977
(Pilot): After a violent storm at sea, the inert body of a man is found on the beach near the Naval Undersea Center. Equipped with webbed hands and gills instead of lungs, he can breathe underwater, swim faster than a dolphin and dive to depths of at least seven miles. He is nursed back to health by Doctor Elizabeth Merrill and given the name of Mark Harris. In return, Mark agrees to help the United States Navy recover a missing submersible. Deep in the ocean, Mark discovers an enormous undersea habitat constructed by Mr. Schubert, a maniacal scientist who has gained the assistance of kidnapped scientists from various nations via mind-control bracelets and plans to destroy all the nations of the world with their own nuclear weapons.
M2	The Death Scouts	Marc Daniels	Robert Lewin	May 7, 1977
Mark investigates the disappearance of three scuba divers, two of whom are 'replaced' by waterborne aliens (Tiffany Bolling as Lioa / Dilly and Burr DeBenning as Xos / Chazz). The aliens assignment is to scout Earth and check its defense capabilities.
M3	Killer Spores	Reza Badiyi	John D. F. Black	May 17, 1977
When a space probe crashes in the ocean near the Cetacean, Mark and Elizabeth agree to investigate. When they arrive, Mark is rendered unconscious by a screeching sound. They discover incorporeal, blue, intelligent spores that can possess the bodies of humans and also Mark, threatening havoc unless they can be returned home.
M4	The Disappearances	Charles S. Dubin	Luther Murdoch, Jerry Sohl	June 20, 1977
Elizabeth Merrill is abducted along with other top scientists in a scheme to abandon Earth in a rocket. Novelization retitled as "Ark of Doom." Similar premise to the pilot featuring abducted scientists, mind control and a dream of utopia.

=== Series ===
No.	Title	Directed by	Written by	Original release date
1	"Melt Down"	Virgil Vogel	Tom Greene	September 22, 1977
Schubert threatens to cause worldwide flooding by using powerful microwaves to melt Earth's polar ice caps, unless the government turns Mark Harris over to him.
2	"The Mudworm"	Virgil Vogel	Alan Caillou	October 13, 1977
When a multimillion-dollar underwater probe malfunctions and begins attacking any ship that travels near it, Mark must reason with its highly advanced brain and convince it to stop.
3	"The Hawk of Mu"	Harry Harris	Luther Murdoch, David H. Balkan	October 18, 1977
While investigating a power outage, Mark discovers a centuries-old hawk statue from the legendary civilization of Mu which can neutralise power from a large area. Schubert discovers the power of the hawk statue and Mark must prevent him from taking it.
4	"Giant"	Richard Benedict	Michael I. Wagner	October 25, 1977
The oceans are leaking through a fissure in the ocean floor. A con-man named Muldoon agrees to guide Mark through the fissure to investigate. However, Mark is unaware either that giants inhabit the other side of the fissure or that Muldoon has already stolen gold from one of them.
5	"Man O' War"	Michael O'Herlihy	Larry Alexander	November 1, 1977
Using his genetic scientists, Schubert produces a giant jellyfish which he intends to release unless his extortion demands are met.
6	"Shoot-Out At Land's End"	Barry Crane	Luther Murdoch	November 8, 1977
Mark is somehow linked with a man named Billy, existing in a wild west town, who appears to be his twin. Investigating, Mark arrives in the town and discovers that Billy once had the same webbing as Mark, but also that he has had it removed.
7	"Crystal Water, Sudden Death"	David Moessinger	Larry Alexander	November 22, 1977
Schubert attempts to make a satellite weapon to knock out Earth's communications. However, to power the weapon, he needs the energy crystals protected by a force field under the ocean. The crystals actually power the force field that protects an underwater world inhabited by a humanoid society. Note: This was the last episode that guest-starred Victor Buono as Mr. Schubert.
8	"The Naked Montague"	Robert Douglas	Stephen Kandel	December 6, 1977
An underwater landslide transports Mark to Verona, Italy, where he intervenes in the story of Romeo and Juliet.
9	"C. W. Hyde"	Dann Cahn	Stephen Kandel	December 13, 1977
C. W. develops a Jekyll-and-Hyde personality after swallowing a mysterious liquid.
10	"Scavenger Hunt"	David Moessinger	Peter Allan Fields	April 18, 1978
Mark re-encounters Muldoon, his nemesis from "Giant," who is using a sea monster to make island natives sacrifice young girls to him.
11	"Imp"	Paul Krasny	Shimon Wincelberg	April 25, 1978
An impish little man enters an underwater station and causes the crew to become irrational simply by touching them. After three crewmen die, the F.F.O.R. hears Duke, the last crewman, talking over the radio in a childish manner and investigates. Mark swims over and brings Duke over to the Cetacean, not knowing the imp has stowed aboard. Note: This was the last episode that co-starred Belinda J. Montgomery as Dr. Elizabeth Merrill; her screen credit was struck from the show's introduction in later episodes.
12	"Siren"	Edward M. Abroms	Michael I. Wagner	May 2, 1978
While investigating the mysterious loss of three ships in one part of the ocean, Mark and the crew of the Cetacean encounter a submarine operated by a modern-day pirate. The pirate has captured a mermaid that can produce a hypnotic siren song, which mesmerizes anyone who hears it, even Mark.
13	"Deadly Carnival"	Dennis Donnelly	Larry Alexander	June 6, 1978
Mark goes undercover to investigate members of a carnival planning to break into a museum. The only way to break into the museum is through an underwater tunnel, through which only Mark can swim. When he is approached, he refuses. The owner of the carnival is then kidnapped and threatened unless Mark helps. (Last installment of the series in its original production run.)

== Home media ==
The pilot film was released on VHS in 1986 by Worldvision Home Video, and re-released in 1987 by Goodtimes Home Video. It was later released on DVD as a part of the Warner Archive collection from Warner Home Video on October 6, 2009. On July 26, 2011, Warner Bros. released Man from Atlantis: The Complete TV Movies Collection, featuring all four television films, as well as Man from Atlantis—The Complete Television Series for Region 1 DVD. The pilot film was released on Blu-ray by Warner Archive Collection on March 12, 2019.

== International releases ==
Man from Atlantis was the first American television series to be shown in the People's Republic of China on March 1, 1980, with the title translated to "The Man from the Bottom of the Atlantic". It was at the time when the "Gang of Four" lost power to Deng Xiaoping, and science research began to get attention, along with economic development. The impact of the series in China was so high that, around the time it started airing, the start time of a concert of a foreign pianist had to be changed. The series aired on Saturday nights; its novelty came at a time when much of television in China was dominated by propaganda. In 2014 academic Nick Stember wrote that multiple people from China who had their childhoods and/or adolescences in the 1980s "still remember [the series] with fondness."

In Brazil it was named O Homem do Fundo do Mar (The Man from the Bottom of the Sea in Portuguese). In Portugal, the title was a direct translation of the original, O Homem da Atlântida, being screened on RTP1 in 1981. In Kuwait, it was released in the early 1980s in English with Arabic subtitles. In the Netherlands, the series was broadcast by TROS broadcasting association, from June 15, 1978, until September 5, 1980. In Germany, the series was broadcast by ARD from 1982 to 1983 and in 1988 by RTL plus with the title translated to Der Mann aus Atlantis. The show preserved its name in France as well, where it aired as L'Homme de l'Atlantide. In Turkey, the series also preserved its name and was broadcast as Atlantis'ten Gelen Adam. It was also shown on SABC in South Africa in 1979, with the original title.

In the United Kingdom, Man from Atlantis was shown, in most regions, in an early Saturday evening slot on ITV starting 24 September 1977. After airing the four television movies, the series was shown at an earlier time from 5 November 1977, opposite the BBC's long-running sci-fi series Doctor Who, which was then in its 15th season. Although Man from Atlantis had not been a ratings/audience-share or demographic success in the US, the series actually beat Doctor Who during its transmission in the UK (this happened again in 1980–81 when ITV screened Buck Rogers in the 25th Century against Doctor Who). In Italy, the series was one of the early successes of the then interregional network Telemilano, future Canale 5, that began to air the series on February 11, 1980, under the name L'Uomo di Atlantide. The first TV-film, Man from Atlantis, was released on video in Norway in the 1980s. In Israel, HaIsh MeAtlantis (a literal translation of the English title) was shown on Channel 1, the only channel in Israel at that time. It first aired there in 1982 and was subsequently repeated.

== Adaptations ==
In 1977, Dell Publishing published a novelization titled Man from Atlantis #1, written by Richard Woodley, which was followed by Man from Atlantis #2: "Death Scouts" from the same author. The line continued unnumbered with Killer Spores (1977) and Ark of Doom (1978), also by Woodley, the latter being the retitled novelization of "The Disappearances". In 1978, Marvel Comics published seven issues of a Man from Atlantis comic book, written by Bill Mantlo with art by Frank Robbins and Frank Springer. At the same time as Marvel, the British children's magazine Look-In began publishing a comic strip; this one was drawn by Mike Noble (and later John Cooper for one story). It was short-lived, lasting less than a year before being replaced with Enid Blyton's Famous Five. Kenner Toys began development on a Man from Atlantis line of action figures and toy vehicles in 1977, but it never proceeded past the prototype stage, while Denys Fisher Toys passed on making Star Wars action figures for the UK as they thought the Man from Atlantis would be more successful.

Series star Patrick Duffy wrote a sequel novel, titled simply Man from Atlantis, which was published in June 2016. The blog space1970, which reported on this novel, described it thus:

When TV unveiled the series Man from Atlantis, no one knew the how, where and why of Mark Harris. Over time the show's star, Patrick Duffy, formulated his own version of the history of Mark and his people. Here at last is the book that gives every reader and fan of the show the life and mythology of Atlantis, who they were and where they came from. Patrick Duffy's close connection to his fictional character makes this a behind the scenes fantasy story.

== See also ==
- List of underwater science fiction works
