= Ron James (comedian) =

Canadian stand-up comedian

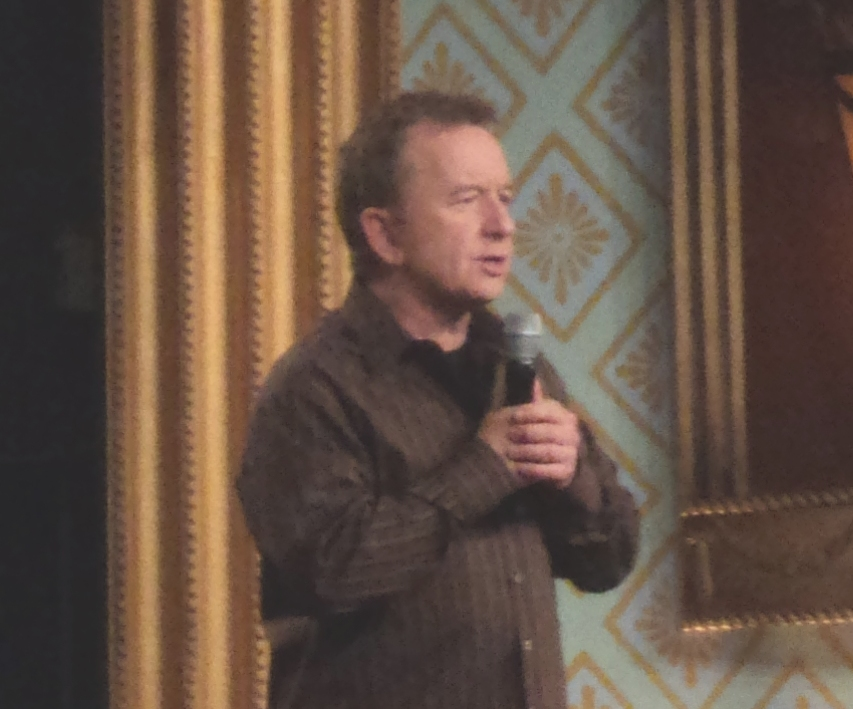
- Ron James taping his show in 2011.
- Born: January 31, 1958 (age 68); Glace Bay, Nova Scotia, Canada
- Education: Acadia University
- Occupations: Stand-up comedian, actor, voice actor, author
- Years active: 1980s–present
- Website: www.ronjames.ca

Ron James (born January 31, 1958) is a Canadian stand-up comedian, author, and voice actor.

== Early life and career ==
James was born in Glace Bay, Nova Scotia; his family later moved to Halifax during his youth. He attended Acadia University, studying history and political science with the intention of becoming a history teacher. During his time at Acadia he came under the influence of Evelyn Garbary, who headed the theatre program, as a result of a course he was taking. After graduating, he moved to Toronto and joined The Second City troupe there, working with them during the 1980s. In 1989, he received a Genie Award nomination for Best Supporting Actor at the 10th Genie Awards, for his performance in the film Something About Love.

He later moved to Los Angeles during the early 1990s for three years and got a spot on a late-night syndicated series produced by Ron Howard's Imagine TV, where he landed the role of Bucky Fergus, a Canadian transplant who worked for the City of Derby, Wisconsin in the Talk parody sitcom My Talk Show, which ran from 1990 to 1991 (in one episode, he bonded with another Canadian, William Shatner, after he used Canadian phrases and sayings Shatner recognized). After that show was cancelled, he made some guest appearances in TV shows (such as Get A Life and Wings) and an appearance in the movie Ernest Rides Again but mostly experienced rejection during this time while incurring sizable debts. He returned to Canada in 1993 and turned his experience in L.A. into a stage show in 1994 called Up & Down in Shaky Town: One Man's Journey through the California Dream, which was also shown as a special on The Comedy Network. Afterwards, he came across the work of Scottish comedian Billy Connolly, whose style helped shape his own and inspired him to start doing stand-up.

== Other work and awards ==
He has also done voice work in animation for shows including Star Wars: Ewoks and RoboCop: The Animated Series. James also played a bank security guard in Tommy Boy.

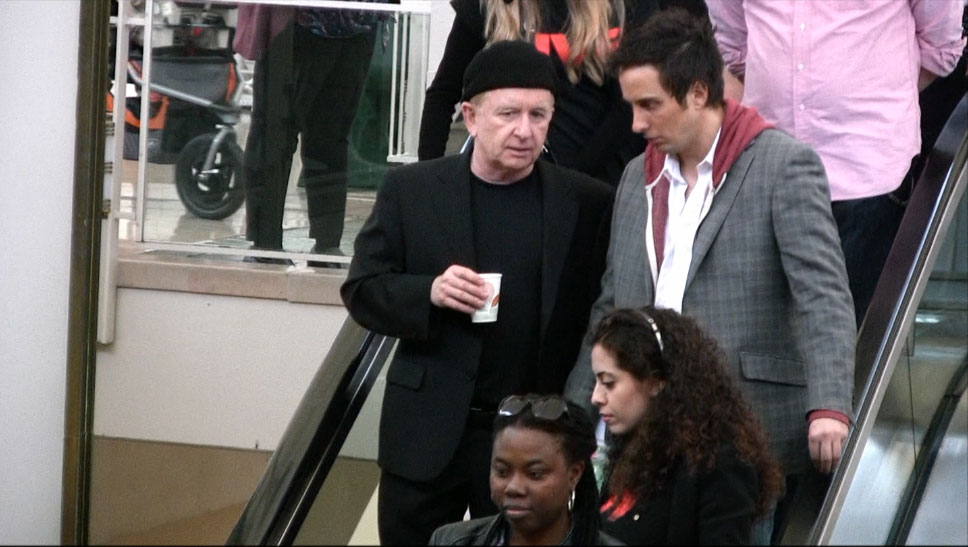
Ron James and Jonny Harris.

James starred in the television series Blackfly and Made in Canada, and won two Canadian Comedy Awards for Best Stand-up (2000) and Best One Person Show for his stand-up show The Road Between My Ears in 2004. He has also won a Gemini Award as part of the writing team for This Hour Has 22 Minutes and received a Genie Award nomination for best supporting actor in the film Something About Love. He had his own CBC Television series, The Ron James Show, from 2009 to 2014.

James has appeared at the Just For Laughs Comedy Festival in Montreal, as a headliner with his own show. A book by Ron James, titled All Over the Map: Rambles and Ruminations from the Canadian Road was published by Doubleday Canada on September 28, 2021. It was an immediate national bestseller, entering the Canadian non-fiction list at number eight on the week of its release.
