= Please Kill Mr. Know It All =

- Directed by: Colin Carter; Sandra Feldman
- Screenplay by: Sandra Feldman
- Produced by: Sandra Feldman
- Starring: Lara Jean Chorostecki; Jefferson Brown; Kristina Pesic; Cliff Saunders
- Cinematography: Pasha Patriki
- Edited by: Michael P. Mason
- Music by: Colin Linden
- Production companies: Road Child Films; Statik Motion Pictures
- Distributed by: Breakthrough Entertainment
- Release date: February 14, 2013 (Canada)
- Running time: 87 minutes
- Country: Canada
- Language: English
- Budget: $2.2 million

Please Kill Mr. Know It All is a 2013 romantic comedy film directed by Colin Carter and Sandra Feldman and starring Lara Jean Chorostecki, Jefferson Brown, Kristina Pesic, and Cliff Sanders.

== Plot ==
Cynical Sally lives a life free of excitement and romance and that's just the way she likes it. Although she'd like to be a novelist, she makes ends meet by ghost writing a local advice column under the pseudonym Mr. Know It All. After a celebrity endorsement turns her column into an overnight success, the newspaper requests a photo of the author from Sally's agent and best friend, Patti. Unfortunately, Patti has been lying to the newspaper, claiming that a man has been writing the column all along. Sally submits a sketch of Albert, a handsome stranger she spotted in a movie theater. The handsome stranger happens to be a contract killer!

Once the picture is published, Albert can no longer walk down the street without being recognized, and so, for the sake of his livelihood, he decides that he must kill Mr. Know It All. While Albert is determined to find Mr. Know It All, Sally conducts a hidden camera interview with Albert to satisfy the press's need to know more about the popular columnist. When Albert and Sally spend more time together, ulterior motives quickly turn into mutual attraction. Sally decides to confess that she is Mr. Know It All. At this point, Albert doesn't know whether to kiss her or kill her and his seeming indifference causes her to push him away.

Meanwhile, the girlfriend of Albert's Mob Boss decides to pack up and leave after being inspired by the advice given in one issue of Mr. Know It All's column. The Mob Boss is heart broken and contracts a hit-man to kill Mr. Know It All, of course choosing Albert. Albert is torn between love and responsibility. Will Albert do the hit? Or will they find happiness in the end? Can they outwit the mob? Will the one-legged man find revenge? These are the questions that Albert must answer.

== Cast ==
- Lara Jean Chorostecki as Sally
- Jefferson Brown as Albert
- Kristina Pesic as Patti
- Cliff Sanders as Bud
- Al Sapienza as Mob Boss
- Colin Mochrie as Talk Show Host
- Tom Wilson as Celebrity
- Dylan Roberts as One Legged Man
