= Jefferson Brown =

Canadian actor (born 1976)

- Born: June 11, 1976 (age 50); Fredericton, New Brunswick
- Occupation: Actor
- Years active: 2000–present

Luis Jefferson Brown (born 1976) is a Canadian actor.

== Life and career ==
Brown was born in Fredericton, New Brunswick. At the age of seven, Brown's family moved to Newmarket, Ontario. He graduated from the Mount Allison University in Sackville, New Brunswick, and later began acting career on stage. He made his screen debut appearing in the 2000 Lifetime Television movie The Stalking of Laurie Show and later made several appearances in television series Queer as Folk. In 2004, Brown made his big screen debut starring in the comedy-drama film, The Right Way. He later appeared in a number of made-for-television movies and had recurring roles on television series such as Slings & Arrows, MVP, Sophie and Being Erica.

Brown had supporting roles in films Red (2010), Silent Hill: Revelation (2012), Carrie (2013) and Make Your Move (2013). Starting in March 2015, he appeared in a series of television commercials for Intact Insurance, promoting the company's policy on opening claims for clients within thirty minutes of being notified (he portraying the claimant). From 2010 to 2014 he had a recurring role as Dex Slade in the ABC police drama series, Rookie Blue. From 2015 to 2017 he had a recurring role of Ben Patterson in the Hallmark Channel fantasy comedy-drama series, Good Witch. Brown also guest-starred on Reign, Private Eyes, Designated Survivor, Baroness Von Sketch Show, Hudson & Rex and Murdoch Mysteries.

Brown played the male lead in the 2014 Hallmark Channel made-for-television movie The Christmas Parade opposite AnnaLynne McCord. He appeared in the several Lifetime movies, include The Perfect Stalker (2016), Snowed-Inn Christmas (2017), Revenge Delivered (2021), and Left for Dead: The Ashley Reeves Story (2021). Brown starred in the Netflix horror anthology series Slasher from 2016 to 2023, playing five different roles. From 2019 to 2021 he co-starred in the Hallmark Channel Western series, When Hope Calls and in 2023 was cast as Colton Landry, Andie MacDowell's character' late husband, in the Hallmark Channel fantasy drama series, The Way Home.

== Filmography ==
=== Film ===
Year	Title	Role	Notes
2002	If Wishes Were Horses	Del	
2004	The Right Way	David	
2005	Cake	Clifford	
2007	Dead Mary	Matt	
2007	Pigs	Miles	
2009	Shark City	Kenny	
2009	At Home by Myself...With You	Dentist's Brother	
2010	The Town	FBI Taskforce Agent 1	
2010	Red	Fred	
2012	Please Kill Mr. Know It All	Albert	
2012	Mr. Viral	Simon	
2012	Silent Hill: Revelation	Detective Santini	
2013	Make Your Move	Michael Griffiths	
2013	Stag	Henry McCarthy	
2013	Carrie	Mr. Ulmann	
2014	Dirty Singles	Gordo	
2014	Shelby	Edward Parker	
2018	Ordinary Days	Eddie Tannen	

=== Television ===
Year	Title	Role	Notes
2000	The Stalking of Laurie Show	Charlie Haber	Television film
2001–2005	Queer as Folk	Birthday Boy #3 / Party Guy / Stud #1	3 episodes
2004	Doc	Photographer / Busby	1 episode
2004	Show Me Yours	Noel	1 episode
2005	Cheap Draft	Mike Pringle	Television film
2005	Descent	Seth	Television film
2005–2006	G-Spot	Duff / Director	4 episodes
2006	Slings and Arrows	Chris Norton	3 episodes
2006	'Til Death Do Us Part	Joe Lohman	1 episode
2007	KAW	John	Television film
2008	MVP	Chase James	3 episodes
2008	Sophie	Dr. Jesse Torres	3 episodes
2009	My Pal Satan	Satan	Recurring role
2009	12 Men of Christmas	Eric	Television film
2009–2011	Being Erica	Scott Galvin	3 episodes
2010	The Bridge	Les Hedford	1 episode
2010	Haven	Tobias	1 episode
2010	Men with Brooms	Jamie	1 episode
2010–2011	Life Unjarred	Randy Mathews	Main role
2010–2014	Rookie Blue	Dex	7 episodes
2011	Good Dog	Sales Guy	1 episode
2011	Salem Falls	Wes	Television film
2011	Witchslayer Gretl	Abyss	Television film
2011	XIII: The Series	Duke	1 episode
2012	The L.A. Complex	Sam Peterson	2 episodes
2012	Mayday	NTSB Investigator Greg Feith	2 episodes
2012	Degrassi: The Next Generation	Brett Burnett	2 episodes
2013	Cracked	Connor McKenzie	1 episode
2013	The Listener	John Burrows	1 episode
2013	Murdoch Mysteries	Lincoln Prescott	1 episode
2013	Played	Victor	1 episode
2014	The Christmas Parade	Beck Thomas	Television film
2014	Dear Viola	Russ	Television film
2015–2017	Good Witch	Ben	Recurring role
2016	Slasher: The Executioner	Trent McBride	Recurring role
2017	Snowed-Inn Christmas	Andrew	Television film
2017	Slasher: Guilty Party	Gene	1 episode
2018	Baroness Von Sketch Show: Is That You Karen?	Alan	1 episode
2019	Slasher: Solstice	Wyatt	Recurring role
2019; 2021	When Hope Calls	Joe Moody	Recurring role
2023–present	The Way Home	Colton Landry	Recurring role
