= 10th Day =

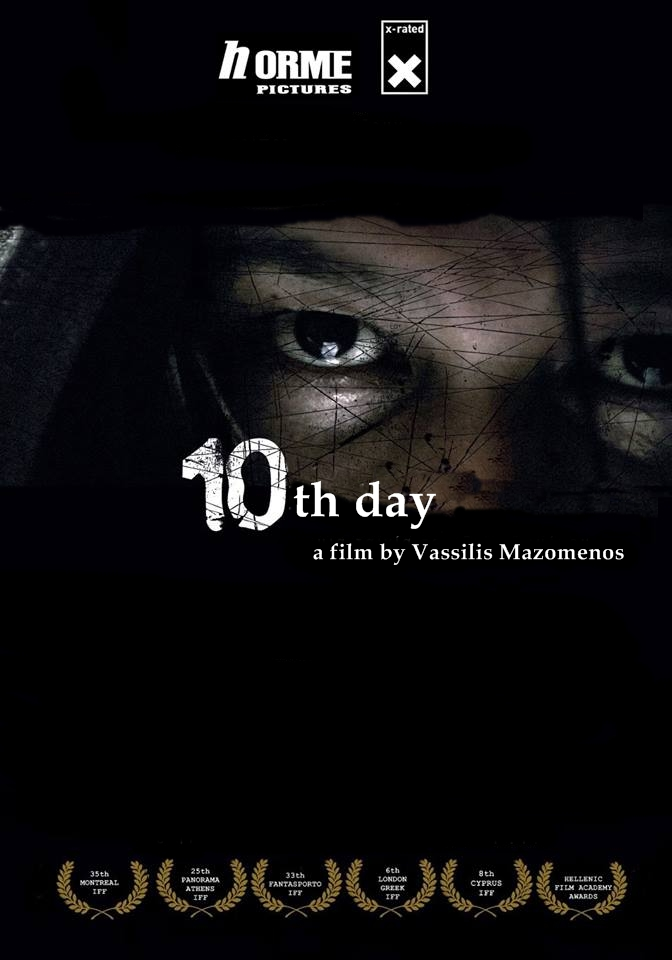
- Film poster
- Directed by: Vassilis Mazomenos
- Screenplay by: Vassilis Mazomenos
- Produced by: Vassilis Mazomenos
- Starring: Ali Haidari
- Cinematography: George Papandrikopoulos
- Edited by: Yiannis Kostavaras
- Music by: Alexandros Christaras, Michael Nivolianitis Dna (Greek Musical Collective)
- Release dates: November 16, 2012 (Panorama of European Cinema); November 7, 2013 (Greece)
- Running time: 83 minutes
- Country: Greece
- Language: English

10th day (Greek: "10η μέρα") is a 2012 Greek feature film in the mockumentary genre, created by the Greek director, writer and producer Vassilis Mazomenos. It was released in November 2013 in Athens.

== Premise ==
The film refers to Ali, an Afghan Muslim, who lives in Athens, Greece. He is trying to get access to the western dream, surrounded by memories of his homeland, his trip to Europe and his «nightmares».

== Cast ==
- Ali Haidari as Ali
- Ioli Demetriou as his Girlfriend
- Mahdi Gorbani as Mahdi
- Hosin Ahmadi as Abas
- Nicos Arvanitis as Man
- Dina Avagianou as Woman
- Vassilis Koukalani as Driver

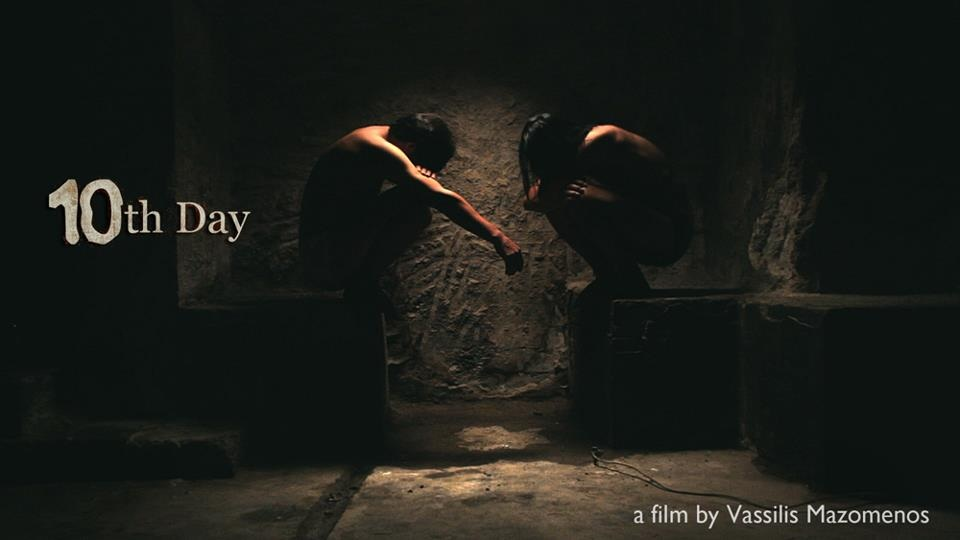
Vassilis Mazomenos movie "10th day" .

== Festivals and awards ==
It was official selection in Montreal World Film Festival, Fantasporto and many other festivals. In 2014 "10th day" represented Greece in E.U Humans Rights Film Festival in Turkey.

== Reviews ==
As Ninos Mikelides wrote: "Mazomenos records the route of his tragic hero through images selected with thought, images artistically wonderful, with lightings that clearly present the psychological state of the persons. The route of the Afghan immigrant gives the director the opportunity to present us cared and inspired pictures of the sad life of immigrants in our country, to conclude with the amazing, shocking images in the finale. Mazomenos managed with that to give us a strong film".
