= The Ron James Show =

Canadian television comedy show

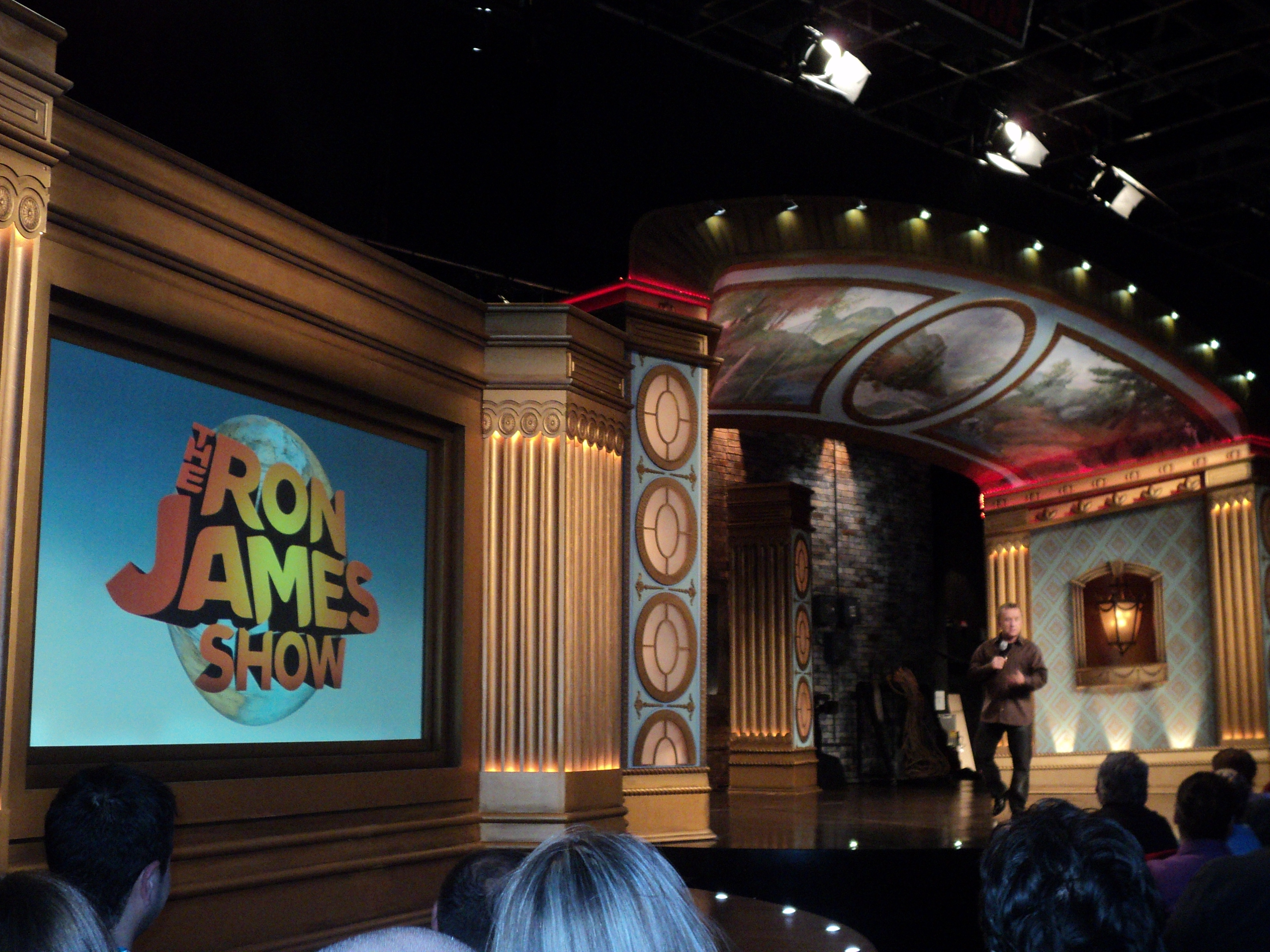
- Set during season 3 of the show.
- Genre: Comedy
- Starring: Ron James
- Country of origin: Canada
- No. of seasons: 5
- No. of episodes: 53 (+ 4 New years specials)

Production
- Running time: 22–23 minutes

Original release
- Network: CBC
- Release: September 25, 2009 – April 14, 2014

The Ron James Show is a Canadian television comedy show that debuted on CBC Television on September 25, 2009.

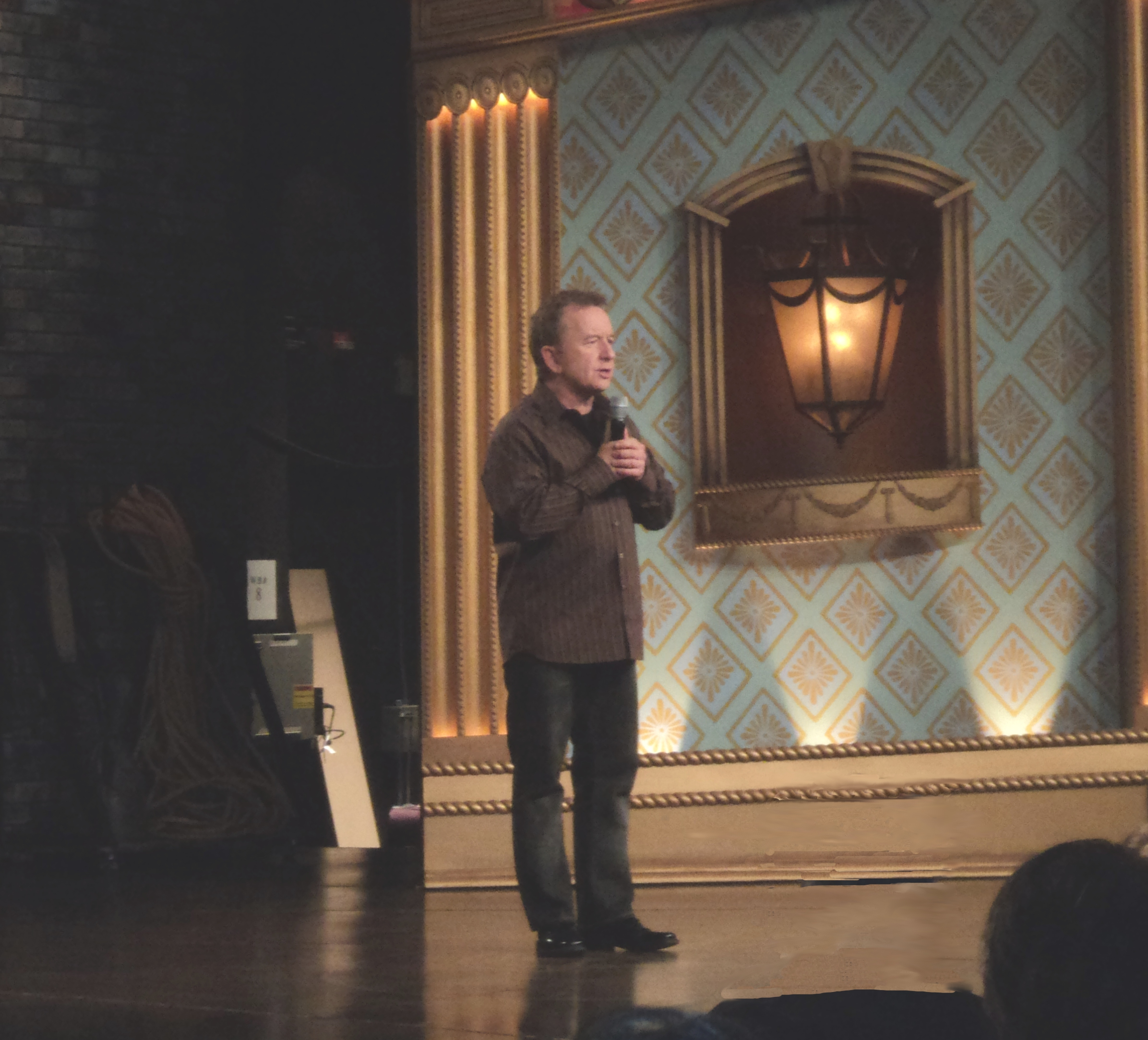
Ron James on set in 2011

Starring comedian Ron James, the show intersperses filmed and stage sketches with clips of James performing his stand-up routine. One of the show's more noted features is L'il Ronnie James, an animated recurring sketch which depicts James as a young child growing up in Cape Breton in the vein of Terry Gilliam's animation style.

On March 11, 2014, Ron James announced online that the show had been cancelled.

== Voice Actors L'il Ronnie ==
Seasons 1-5

L'il Ronnie James:	Ron James
Pa James	Mark Day
Ma James	Linda Kash

== Ratings ==
Season One

Episode	Aired	Audience
Episode 1	September 25, 2009	803,000
Episode 2	October 2, 2009	709,000
Episode 3	October 9, 2009	656,000
Episode 4	October 16, 2009	739,000
Episode 5	October 23, 2009	584,000
Episode 6	October 30, 2009	554,000
Episode 7	November 6, 2009	811,000
Episode 8	November 13, 2009	698,000
Episode 9	November 20, 2009	570,000
Episode 10	November 27, 2009	663,000
New Year's Eve Special	December 31, 2009	828,000

Season Two

Episode	Aired	Audience
Episode 1	September 24, 2010	406,000
Episode 2	October 1, 2010	500,000
Episode 3	October 8, 2010	629,000
Episode 4	October 15, 2010	559,000
Episode 5	October 22, 2010	678,000
Episode 6	October 29, 2010	661,000
Episode 7	November 5, 2010	546,000
Episode 8	November 12, 2010	648,000
Episode 9	November 19, 2010	766,000
Episode 10	November 26, 2010	595,000
Episode 11	December 3, 2010	610,000
New Year's Eve Special	December 31, 2010	923,000

Season Three

Episode	Aired	Audience
Episode 1	September 16, 2011	510,000
Episode 2	September 23, 2011	442,000
Episode 3	September 30, 2011	442,000
Episode 4	October 14, 2011	501,000
Episode 5	October 21, 2011	512,000
Episode 6	October 28, 2011	482,000
Episode 7	November 4, 2011	460,000
Episode 8	November 18, 2011	485,000
Episode 9	November 25, 2011	487,000
Episode 10	December 2, 2011	585,000
Episode 11	December 9, 2011	500,000
New Year's Eve Special	January 1, 2012	883,000

Season Four

Episode	Aired	Audience
New Year's Eve Special	December 31, 2012	939,000
Episode 1	January 7, 2013	
Episode 2	January 14, 2013	
Episode 3	January 21, 2013	
Episode 4	January 30, 2013	
Episode 5	February 6, 2013	
Episode 6	February 13, 2013	
Episode 7	February 27, 2013	
Episode 8	March 6, 2013	
Episode 9	March 20, 2013	
Episode 10	March 27, 2013	
Episode 11	April 3, 2013	
Episode 12	April 10, 2013	
Episode 13	April 17, 2013	

Season Five

Episode	Aired	Audience
Episode 1	February 24, 2014	
Episode 2	March 2, 2014	
Episode 3	March 10, 2014	
Episode 4	March 17, 2014	
Episode 5	March 24, 2014	
Episode 6	March 31, 2014	
Episode 7	April 7, 2014	
Episode 8	April 14, 2014	
