= 3rd Canadian Comedy Awards =

Awards ceremony for works of 2001

- Date: 4 April 2002
- Location: The Docks; Toronto, Ontario
- Country: Canada
- Presented by: Canadian Comedy Foundation for Excellence
- Hosted by: Brent Butt

Highlights
- Most wins: Made in Canada (4)
- Most nominations: Television: Made in Canada (8); Film: Last Wedding and Rare Birds (4)
- Website: www.canadiancomedyawards.org

The 3rd Canadian Comedy Awards, presented by the Canadian Comedy Foundation for Excellence (CCFE), honoured the best live, television, and film comedy of 2001 and was held on 4 April 2002 at The Docks in Toronto, Ontario. The ceremony was hosted by Brent Butt. This was the first year that the ceremony was not televised, and the first year that no special awards were given.

Canadian Comedy Awards, also known as Beavers, were awarded in 19 categories. Winners were picked by members of ACTRA (Alliance of Canadian Cinema, Television and Radio Artists), the Writers Guild of Canada, the Directors Guild of Canada, and the Comedy Association.

The TV series Made in Canada led with eight nominations followed by the film Last Wedding with five. Made in Canada won four Beavers, two of which went to director Henry Sarwer-Foner. Also winning two Beavers were Janet van de Graaf for best female improviser and best female TV performance in History Bites, Bob Martin for best male improviser and best writing for an episode of Made in Canada, and Rick Mercer for best male TV performance in Made in Canada and writing for This Hour has 22 Minutes.

== Ceremony ==
The 3rd Canadian Comedy Awards ceremony was held on 4 April 2002 at The Docks in Toronto, Ontario. It was hosted by Brent Butt, the previous year's winner for best male stand-up. This was the first year the ceremony was not broadcast, due to a lack of sponsorship. As a result, the ceremony was scaled back in what journalist Leatrice Spevack described as a night of "gags over glamour".

While giving his acceptance speech for best comedic play, the base of Doug Morency's Beaver fell off. He quickly remarked, "Obviously, they're not made in Canada".

== Winners and nominees ==
Winners are listed first and highlighted in boldface:

=== Live ===
| Best Male Stand-up | Best Female Stand-up | Best Stand-up Newcomer |
|---|---|---|
| **Shaun Majumder**; Derek Edwards; Jason Rouse; John Wing Jr.; Mike Wilmot; Peter Kelamis | **Kristeen von Hagen**; Heidi Foss; Kate Davis; Martha Chaves; Nikki Payne; Shannon Laverty | **Debra DiGiovanni**; Casey Corbin; Dave Hemstad; Dylan Mandlsohn; Manolis Zontanos |
| Best Male Improviser | | Best Female Improviser |
| **Bob Martin**; Adrian Truss; David C. Jones; Doug Morency; Roman Danylo | | **Janet van de Graaf**; Diana Frances; Jane Luk; Lisa Merchant; Rebecca Northan |
| Best Sketch Troupe or Company | | Best Improv Troupe or Company |
| **The Gentlemen Callers**; Birdy Num Num; Glyph; Reid Along with Browning; The Cowards | | **Slap Happy**; Cast of Die-Nasty; On the Spot; Rock-Paper-Scissors; Sin City: The Improvised Soap Opera |
| Best One Person Show | | Best New Play |
| **Erotic Laser Swordfight**; Fully Committed; My Big Fat Greek Wedding; Things Under the Bed; Welcome to My Nightmary: Mary Crosbie | | **Family Circus Maximus**; A Twisted Cyrano D'Bergerac; Critic; Sideshow of the Damned; Spandex! |

=== Television ===
| Best Performance by a Male | Best Performance by a Female |
|---|---|
| **Rick Mercer – Made in Canada**; Rick Wharton – Conspiracy Guy; Peter Keleghan – Made in Canada; Vik Sahay – Our Hero; Martin Short – Primetime Glick | **Janet van de Graaf – History Bites**; Anne Tager Page – After Hours; Jackie Torrens – Made in Canada; Leah Pinsent – Made in Canada; Jeanie Calleja – Our Hero |
| Best Direction in a Series | Best Direction in a Special or episode |
| **Michael Kennedy, T. W. Peacocke, Stephen Reynolds, Henry Sarwer-Foner and Jerry Ciccoritti – Made in Canada**; Michael Kennedy – Blackfly; Bob Sorger – Gutterball Alley; Rick Green – History Bites; Greg Lawrence – The Endless Grind | **Henry Sarwer-Foner – Made in Canada – "Damacles What a Doll"**; Allan Manson – Comedy Now! – "Jason Rouse"; John Karolidis – Ham I Am; Greg Lawrence – The Endless Grind |
| Best Writing in a Series | Best Writing in a Special or episode |
| **Cathy Jones, Rick Mercer, Greg Thomey, Mary Walsh, Luciano Casimiri, Mark Farrell, Paul Mather, Peter McBain, Christian Murray, George Westerholm and Kevin White – This Hour Has 22 Minutes**; Kenny Robinson, Joe Bodolai, Trey Anthony, Marina Gail, Bruce Hunter, Jean Paul – After Hours; Danny DiTata, Rick Green, Duncan McKenzie, Amy McKenzie, Eric Lunsky, Jason Taniguchi, Jeremy Winkels – History Bites; Rick Mercer, Mark Farrell, Alex Galatis, Alex Ganetakos, Ed Macdonald, Bob Martin, Edward Riche, Raymond Storey – Made in Canada; Suzanne Bolch, John May – Our Hero | **Bob Martin – Made in Canada – "Alan's Ex"**; Ian Boothby, Roger Fredericks – Big Sound – "Number One with a Bullet"; Jason Rouse – Comedy Now! – "Jason Rouse"; Brad Birch, Craig Lauzon – Ham I am; Jessica Holmes – Holmes Alone |

=== Film ===
| Best Performance by a Male | Best Performance by a Female |
|---|---|
| **Eugene Levy** – **American Pie 2**; Benjamin Ratner – Last Wedding; Andy Jones – Rare Birds; Chris Owens – The Uncles; Louis Di Bianco – Who is Cletis Tout? | **Mary Walsh** – **Rare Birds**; Frida Betrani – Last Wedding; Molly Parker – Last Wedding; Megan Dunlop – Parsley Days; Kathleen Robertson – Scary Movie 2 |
| Best Direction | Best Writing |
| **Bruce Sweeney** – **Last Wedding**; Andrea Dorfman – Parsley Days; Sturla Gunnarsson – Rare Birds; James Allodi – The Uncles; William Phillips – Treed Murray | **Karen Walton** – **Ginger Snaps**; Bruce Sweeney – Last Wedding; Andrea Dorfman – Parsley Days; Edward Riche – Rare Birds; James Allodi – The Uncles |

== Multiple wins ==
The following people, shows, films, etc. received multiple awards

| Awards | Person or work |
|---|---|
| 4 | Made in Canada |

== Multiple nominations ==
The following people, shows, films, etc. received multiple nominations

| Nominations | Person or work |
|---|---|
| 8 | Made in Canada |
| 4 | Last Wedding |
| 4 | Our Hero |
| 4 | Rare Birds |
| 3 | Parsley Days |
| 3 | The Uncles |
| 2\ | After Hours |
| 2\ | History Bites |
