= Gutterball Alley =

Canadian television game show

Gutterball Alley is a Canadian television game show, which aired on The Comedy Network in 2001 and 2002. Inspired by The Man Show and Japanese game shows, the series featured contestants performing various gross-out stunts, such as bobbing for bull testicles in a vat of milk, jumping into a bathtub filled with maggots or drinking grape juice from grapes squeezed by a fat man sitting on them, for money.

The series was hosted by Wade McElwain and Johnny Gardhouse. The game segments were interspersed with comedy sketches featuring Terry McGurrin and Angelo Tsarouchas, as well as bonus round segments where contestants could win additional money by bowling in their underwear.

The program was the subject of a complaint to the Canadian Broadcast Standards Council, following a 2002 episode in which the contestants were challenged to guess at the various "genital origami" shapes being made by guests Simon Morley and David Friend of Puppetry of the Penis. The council concluded that the depictions of penises in the episode did not contravene its policies around nudity, as it was relevant and appropriate within the narrative context, but it found The Comedy Network culpable for not running a viewer advisory around the use of four-letter words in the dialogue.

29 episodes of the show were produced over two seasons.

Bob Sorger received a Canadian Comedy Award nomination for Best Direction in a TV Series at the 3rd Canadian Comedy Awards in 2002.
