= Love That Boy =

2003 film by Andrea Dorfman

- Directed by: Andrea Dorfman
- Written by: Jennifer Deyell; Andrea Dorfman
- Produced by: Jan Nathanson
- Starring: Nadia Litz; Adrien Dixon; PJ Crosby; Nikki Barnett; Elliot Page (Note: Credited as Ellen Page; Page came out as transgender and changed his name in 2020.)
- Cinematography: Tom Harding
- Edited by: Michael Vernon
- Distributed by: Mongrel Media
- Release date: September 19, 2003
- Running time: 85 minutes
- Country: Canada
- Language: English

Love That Boy is a 2003 Canadian film and romantic comedy directed by Andrea Dorfman and starring Nadia Litz and Adrien Dixon. It is about a woman in love with a younger teenage boy. In French the film is called J'aime ce garçon.

== Plot ==
Phoebe (Nadia Litz) is a perky university student who has difficulty relating to her fellow students. Her only friend is her roommate Robin (Nikki Barnett) who she smothers with advice. Eventually, Robin cracks under the pressure of being Phoebe's only friend and leaves on a plane with a stranger she just met. She informs Phoebe that she is too uptight and immature, casually mentioning that she's never even had a boyfriend.

Embarrassed by her own immaturity, Phoebe tries to go on a date. After it goes sour, she ends up talking to Frazer, her 14-year-old neighbour who mows her lawn. As time passes, Phoebe grows close to Frazer, as he enjoys listening to her advice and looks up to and respects her while also teaching her to have fun and relax. However, their friendship begins to strain when Robin returns and notices that Phoebe is spending lots of time with Frazer and has crossed getting a boyfriend off her task list. Meanwhile, Suzanna (Elliot Page), Frazer's neighbour, grows jealous of all the time he is spending with Phoebe and tells him that Phoebe will want to have sex with him in an effort to scare him. Instead, Frazer buys condoms and later attempts to kiss Phoebe. Disturbed, Phoebe brushes him off and pushes him away.

On her way to graduation, Frazer approaches Phoebe to talk. She ends up kissing him in front of Robin and her friends, but the two realize the age difference between them is too large for anything romantic to happen. Instead, they go to Phoebe's graduation ceremony as friends.

== Production ==
Love That Boy was filmed in Halifax, Nova Scotia. One critic speculated the budget was low, but that that was used as an advantage, saying a "slightly cheesy look and sound of everything in Phoebe's life... justifies good old Canuck cheapness as a point of comedy."

Director Andrea Dorfman told the press that in her work, she tried to adapt reality with character-based style, and would "look at things from a different perspective." Dorfman co-wrote the screenplay, placing the character Phoebe in university because Dorfman saw herself as overconfident of her knowledge when she went to college. The point would then be to demonstrate that studying is not complete knowledge. Dorfman also claims that the low budget was because larger companies would want to change the story so that Frazer and Phoebe become lovers, while the actual points of the film were reaching maturity and friendship.

=== Casting ===
Dorfman had previously made a film entitled Parsley Days. That film had impressed Litz, and Litz felt that anything else by Dorfman would be good. Thus, when Litz was informed by her agent that she could audition by videotape for a film by Dorfman, Litz opted instead to fly from Los Angeles, California, to audition in person. Dorfman also found Dixon to be "an old soul."

== Release ==
The film was first run at the Atlantic Film Festival on September 19, 2003. The film was re-released on November 7 of that year. On January 24, 2004, it played in Oxford Cinema in Halifax, which the press claimed marked the first time the film would be screened where it had been shot.

The film was screened at the inaugural edition of the Nova Scotia Retro Film Festo in January 2025.

== Reception ==
Despite the similarity in the subject matter, one critic asserted that Love That Boy is not a "male version of Lolita," but rather just a statement of how love can be perplexing. This critic complimented Litz and Dixon's acting, and called Love That Boy "a little gem of a film." Katherine Monk of The Ottawa Citizen also addressed the subject matter, saying that the film is "a little bizarre – not to mention disconcerting... the film rides the edge of ickiness." However, Monk credited Dorfman and Litz with "charm" and "style" that eased these factors. Litz herself acknowledged that sex between the main characters "would be gross."

Monk also said that Litz "makes us believe in the near-cartoonish Phoebe by giving her moments of vulnerability and compassion." For this film, the Vancouver Film Critics Circle nominated Litz as Best Actress of the year in Canadian cinema, but she lost to Sarah Polley in My Life Without Me.

However, another critic wrote that "The whole thing is charming to look at, wise and funny – but, alas, slim. Slight." Columnist David Spaner disapproved of Dixon's acting, although he felt Litz and Barnett were good, and found the writing poor in places. He doubted the film's wisdom, and felt that lines like "I am too much and not enough at the same time" had been done before and were incomprehensible.
