= How to Be At Home =

2020 Canadian film directed by Andrea Dorfman

- Directed by: Andrea Dorfman
- Written by: Tanya Davis
- Produced by: Annette Clarke
- Narrated by: Tanya Davis
- Edited by: Andrea Dorfman
- Music by: Tanya Davis; Daniel Ledwell
- Production company: National Film Board of Canada
- Release date: 2020
- Running time: 5 minutes
- Country: Canada
- Language: English

How to Be At Home is a Canadian short film, directed by Andrea Dorfman and released in 2020. A sequel to her 2009 short film How to Be Alone, the film illustrates a spoken word piece by poet Tanya Davis about coping with isolation during the COVID-19 pandemic.

The film was created for The Curve, a National Film Board of Canada film series about life during the pandemic.

The film was named to the Toronto International Film Festival's year-end Canada's Top Ten list for short films.
