= Andrea Dorfman =

Canadian film director

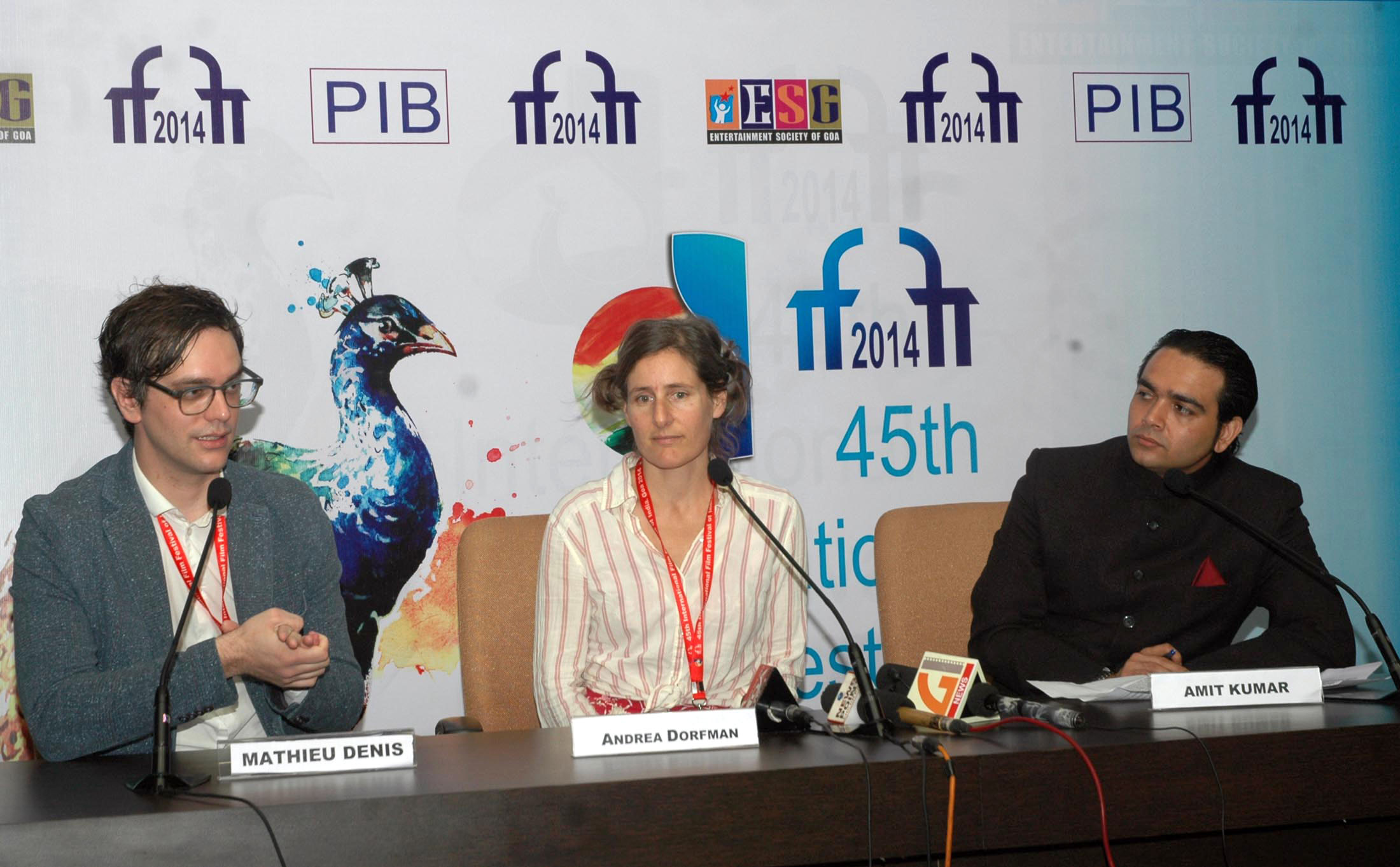
- Dorfman at IFFI 2014
- Born: October 29, 1968 (age 57); Toronto, Ontario, Canada
- Occupation(s): Screenwriter, film director

Andrea Dorfman (born October 29, 1968) is a Canadian screenwriter and film director based in Halifax, Nova Scotia. She directed the Emmy Award films Flawed (2010) and Big Mouth (2012). Dorfman is one of the four co-creators of Blowhard. She mainly creates short and feature films but also works on mini-documentaries for the Equality Effect, a human rights organization. She is currently working on The Playground in collaboration with Jennifer Deyell.

She lives in Halifax with her boyfriend Dave Hayden, his children Max and Sydney, their two cats and dog. She has been creating experimental and dramatic shorts, as well as feature films, since 1995. Dorfman occasionally teaches classes at the Nova Scotia College of Art and Design.

== Early life ==
Dorfman was born in Toronto, Ontario, on October 29, 1968. She fell in love with filmmaking at 12 years old, when her father gave her a camera. She graduated from McGill University and the Nova Scotia College of Art and Design.

== Career ==
Dorfman's first major film, Swerve (1998), tells the story of a group of friends who embark on a road trip which winds up in an uncomfortable lesbian love triangle. That same year, she made a docudrama about a nine-year-old girl suffering from separation anxiety, called Nine (1998). These two films won her the Most Promising New Director Award at the 1998 Atlantic Film Festival.

Her first feature film Parsley Days (2000), premiered at the Toronto International Film Festival. The film is a comedy about a young woman seeking an abortion after accidentally conceiving a child with her boyfriend. The main character, Kate, has been dating Ollie since high school but finds herself unhappy with the relationship. The film suggests she may have had a brief affair that led to the pregnancy. Kate tries to terminate the pregnancy by eating a diet filled with Parsley. In the end, Kate and Ollie break up. The filming was done over the course of eleven days on a budget of $65,000 and was based in Halifax, Nova Scotia. Dorfman found local Halifax actors and musicians for her crew, cast, and soundtrack. Dorfman worked as the writer, producer, director and Photographer of the film, using a hand-held camera. The film premiered without a distributor, so Dorfman delayed releasing the budget of the film. The film received mixed reviews. Eye magazine said "well-executed, but slightly over-earnest." The Globe and Mail called it "endlessly charming." Finally, the film landed her a distribution deal with Toronto-based Mongrel Media after a sold-out screening at the Atlantic Film Festival and a screening at the New York Independent Film Project.

Her second feature, Love that Boy, featured Nadia Litz as a sexually immature type-A university student who develops a close relationship with her teenage neighbour after failing to find a boyfriend. The film also featured Elliot Page in a small role. It premiered at the 2003 Atlantic Film Festival. The film was described as charming despite the subject matter.

In 2005, she directed the documentary Sluts (2005), which focused on women discussing the feeling of being labeled as so. She also produced the short film There's a Flower in My Pedal that year, which was a runner up for best short at the Toronto International Film Festival in 2005.

Dorfman created Art in 2008, a short animation film to Tanya Davis' song Art. Dorfman also filmed Lost and Found (2008), which focused on local Halifax artist and writer Jane Kansas and her collection of knowledge about Harper Lee, who is best known for writing the novel To Kill a Mockingbird. She finished it in time for the International Documentary Challenge.

In 2009, Dorfman used a grant from BravoFACT to create an animated short film based on a poem by Tanya Davis, titled How to Be Alone. In 2010 Dorfman posted the piece on YouTube where it went viral and gained over a million views in a few months and accolades from Roger Ebert and The Atlantic. She also made an animated film for the NYC Bicycle Film Festival called Thoughts on My Bike (2009).

In 2020 Dorfman created the sequel film How to Be At Home, based on another poem by Davis about coping with isolation during the COVID-19 pandemic in Canada. The film was named to the Toronto International Film Festival's year-end Canada's Top Ten list for 2020.

Dorfman continued to experiment with animation with Flawed, a 2010 short animated documentary combining stop-motion animation and hand-painted images. Flawed was produced in Halifax by Annette Clarke for the National Film Board of Canada. Dorfman proceeded to make more short films and animations filmed with colourful and often 2D watercolour images.

In 2010 she began making films for the human rights organization, The Equality Effect. She began with two short animated PSA's called 160 Girls (2010) and The Equality Effect (2010), bringing awareness to the issues that girls in Kenya, Malawi, and Ghana face.

She later began working on Fogo Island, Newfoundland for the first time. There she filmed Tilting Quilting (2010), about the quilts made by the people of Tilting, Fogo Island. In 2010 she also created the short 2D animation called Summer Stairs, to go along with a song that her boyfriend wrote her. Her final film that year was, another short animation, called The Drums based on the song of the same name by Tanya Davis.

In 2012 she continued her work with The Art of Equality (2012). She created a mini documentary showcasing the work that Kenyan lawyers are doing to take the Kenyan Government to task for not protecting young girls from rape. That year she also released Big Mouth (2012), an animated film that was done in 2D puppet stop motion. It was produced and distributed by the National Film Board of Canada.

In 2013 she created the short animation Eulogy for You and Me (2013).

In 2014, Dorfman returned to feature film making with Heartbeat, a film about a young woman struggling to overcome her fears of becoming a musician. The film starred musician Tanya Davis and premiered at the 2014 Toronto International Film Festival in the Contemporary World Cinema section. It also screened at the Atlantic Film Festival.

In 2018 she announced she was working on the film Spinster starring Chelsea Peretti about a woman convinced she will spend the rest of her life single after being dumped on her 39th birthday.

Dorfman is currently working on a film called The Playground with Jennifer Deyell.

She has made tremendous contributions in the Canada film industry, particularly around animation.

== Work ==
Dorfman used to finance her films by working as a camera assistant or a cinematographer on other people's films and music videos.

She is known for her ability to turn the taboo into something different. She pulls the viewers mind from disturbing thoughts with an offbeat sense of humour. This is especially apparent in her films Parsley Days and Love that Boy. She is also recognized for her experimentation with animation.

== Filmography ==
Filmography
1998	Nine
1998	Swerve
2000	Parsley Days
2003	Love That Boy
2005	Sluts
2005	There's a Flower in My Pedal
2008	Art
2008	Lost and Found
2009	How to Be Alone
2009	Thoughts on my bike
2010	Flawed
2010	160 Girls
2010	Tilting Quilting
2010	The equality effect
2010	Summer stairs
2010	The Drums
2012	The Art of Equality
2012	Big Mouth
2013	Heartbeat
2014	Eulogy for You and Me
2017	The Girls of Meru
2019	Spinster
2020	How to Be At Home
2024	Hairy Legs
