= Carbon Arc Cinema =

Film organization in Nova Scotia, Canada

Carbon Arc Cinema is a film organization in Halifax, Nova Scotia, which screens a regular program of films at the city's Nova Scotia Museum of Natural History. The organization concentrates principally on a rep theatre program of independent Canadian and international films that are not otherwise screening at the city's commercial movie theatres.

The organization was launched in 2010. It initially screened films at The Khyber arts centre, before moving to the museum after the Khyber shut down due to financial difficulties in the mid-2010s.

During the COVID-19 pandemic in 2020, the organization shifted to a virtual cinema model. The committee attributed the volunteer-run organization's survival to the fact that they normally screened movies at a government facility, and thus didn't need as much money to operate as they would if they needed to pay operational and maintenance costs on their own dedicated theatre.

The organization also stages several annual specialty film festivals, including the Hellifax Horror Film Festival for horror films and the Nova Scotia Retro Film Festo, dedicated to screening Nova Scotia films that are no longer in commercial distribution. The inaugural edition of the Retro Film Festo screened the films Touch & Go, Poor Boy's Game, New Waterford Girl and Love That Boy, while the second edition in 2026 featured The Hanging Garden, Growing Op, The Corridor, Margaret's Museum and Hobo with a Shotgun.
