= Evelyn: The Cutest Evil Dead Girl =

- Directed by: Brad Peyton
- Written by: Brad Peyton; Lee Hoverd
- Produced by: James Mauro
- Starring: Nadia Litz; Joshua Close
- Cinematography: Dylan MacLeod
- Edited by: Kathy Weinkauf
- Music by: Philip Stanger
- Release date: 2002
- Running time: 9 minutes
- Country: Canada
- Language: English
- Budget: $16,000

Evelyn: The Cutest Evil Dead Girl is a 2002 black comedy short film directed by Newfoundlander Brad Peyton. It stars Nadia Litz in the title role, and Joshua Close, and is narrated by Maurice Dean Wint. The film is sometimes called Evelyn: The Cutest Evil Dead Girl Ever.

== Plot ==
The film is about an evil living dead girl named Evelyn who decides that she needs friends. Her gifts for other girls (including a crow's heart) only scare them. Evelyn then tries to resurrect herself through suicide, after reading a book entitled How to Kill Yourself Back to Life. Her suicide attempts fail; part of the problem is that she wastes her bullets killing birds instead of herself, and she swings on her rope instead of hanging herself. Eventually, one boy (Close) is killed in a bus accident and becomes a living dead friend for her.

== Cast ==
- Nadia Litz as Evelyn
- Joshua Close as Devin
- Heidi Ford as Rich Girl 1
- Sarah Kanter as Rich Girl 2
- Sunday Muse as Rich Girl 3
- Maurice Dean Wint as Narrator

== Production ==
The film was inspired by Peyton's aunt, who was named Evelyn and one day remarked that no characters are named Evelyn in great films. At the time, Peyton was attending the Canadian Film Centre, and the film was produced by the Universal Studios Short Dramatic Film Program. Peyton co-wrote the film and acknowledged it was "very, very Seussian and Tim Burtonish."

Beyond the $16,000 needed to make the film, it had no budget for actors. Thus, Nadia Litz did not receive any money for her performance, saying she instead took the role because she liked the scene where she hangs from a rope. Close explained his acting approach to the film by saying, "It was kind of a silent movie. I had to use Charlie Chaplin expressions and you have to be blunt."

== Reception ==
The film was initially shown to Peyton's classmates, who clapped in approval. A filmmaker named Jeremy Podeswa thus suggested Peyton should also show the film to a lawyer in the film business in New York. This allowed the film to be distributed among the filmmaking elite. Evelyn also appeared in the Toronto International Film Festival in 2002.

The film received a music award in the Clermont-Ferrand Short Film Festival in France and an award in the Nodance Film Festival in Utah in 2003. It also won a "Slam Dance Award". In 2004, it was nominated for the Genie Award for Best Live Action Short Drama at the 24th Genie Awards. The film has also played on television on the Canadian series ZeD, and has been described as a "fan-favorite."
