= There's a Flower in My Pedal =

2005 Canadian film directed by Andrea Dorfman

- Directed by: Andrea Dorfman
- Written by: Andrea Dorfman
- Produced by: Sonya Jampolsky; Walter Forsyth
- Cinematography: Andrea Dorfman
- Edited by: Thorben Bieger
- Music by: Kevin Lewis; Graeme Campbell
- Production company: Atlantic Filmmakers Cooperative
- Release date: 2005
- Running time: 4 minutes
- Country: Canada
- Language: English

There's a Flower in My Pedal is a Canadian short film, directed by Andrea Dorfman and released in 2005. Blending live action and animation in a collage style, the film is a poetic meditation on facing up to fear and insecurity, inspired in part by a childhood memory of her mother never riding her beloved bicycle again in her lifetime after sustaining a minor injury from falling off of it.

The film premiered at the 2005 Toronto International Film Festival, where it received an honorable mention from the jury for the Toronto International Film Festival Award for Best Canadian Short Film. In 2023, the film was also awarded the Grand Jury Prize at the International Cycling Film Festival, Herne, Germany.
