= Puppetry of the Penis =

Australian performance show

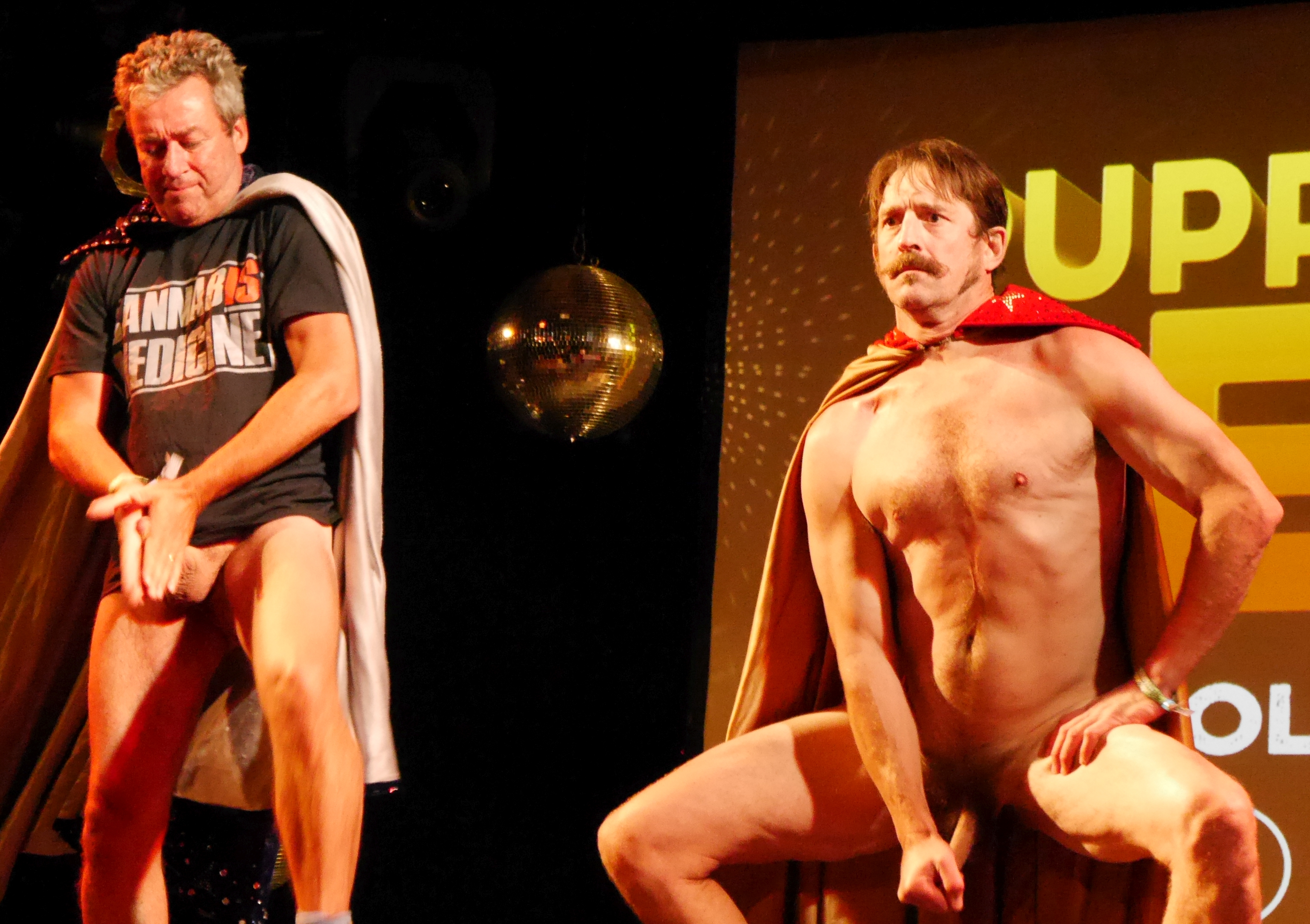
- Simon Morley & David Friend, Puppetry of the Penis, Glastonbury Festival, 2019
- Original language: English
- Written by: Simon Morley & David Friend

Premiere
- Date: 1996
- Place: Melbourne International Comedy Festival, Melbourne, Victoria, Australia
- Official website

Puppetry of the Penis is a comedic live performance-art show featuring a series of genital contortions. The show was initially conceived as the title of a highbrow art calendar released by Australian Simon Morley in 1996. The calendar showcased twelve penis "installations" (the manipulation of male genitalia into a variety of recognisable forms). In response to increasing requests for live demonstrations, in 1997 Morley enlisted fellow Australian, David "Friendy" Friend, to devise a performance show consisting of body-based genital comedy.

The show involves two nude men who bend, twist, and fold their penises and scrotums into various shapes. The theatrical contortion of the male genitalia accompanied by comedic narration has since spread internationally. It is humorously termed "dick trick" or "genital origami."

Puppetry of the Penis was first performed on stage at the 1998 Melbourne International Comedy Festival in Australia, featuring the creators, Morley and Friend, as the premiere cast. The show has since appeared on the international stage, featuring productions in Australia, New Zealand, the UK, Europe, Canada, the United States, South Africa and Argentina. The initial Australian tour was the subject of Australian comedian Mick Molloy's 2000 documentary Tackle Happy. The duo has recruited supporting production teams and actors across Australia, the UK and the U.S., allowing international performance demands to be met. Due to the success of the show, the business was expanded to cater for private parties around Australia.

A Puppetry of the Penis TV special has aired in Australia on One.

== Background ==
In 1996, Australian comedian Simon Morley created an art calendar that showcased close-up images of twelve penis 'installations'. The concept was based on Morley and his youngest brother's creation of a series of party tricks involving various contortions of their genitalia. In order to market the calendars, Morley devised a live routine. Morley's first demonstration, held in a garage in 1997, was received well by audience members, and encouraged him to pursue the creation of a stage show in which to showcase the tricks. Morley originally intended to recruit his brother to perform the act alongside him; however, he had already committed to a part on the Australian TV show Neighbours. Morley enlisted David "Friendy" Friend, a Melbourne resident who had previously run a small entertainment business that catered to bachelorette parties, as his stage partner, and together they developed a comedy routine based on Morley's original concept. The title of the calendar, 'Puppetry of the Penis', was the inspiration for the title of the subsequent performance show, which featured a repertoire of similar contortions.

== Summary ==
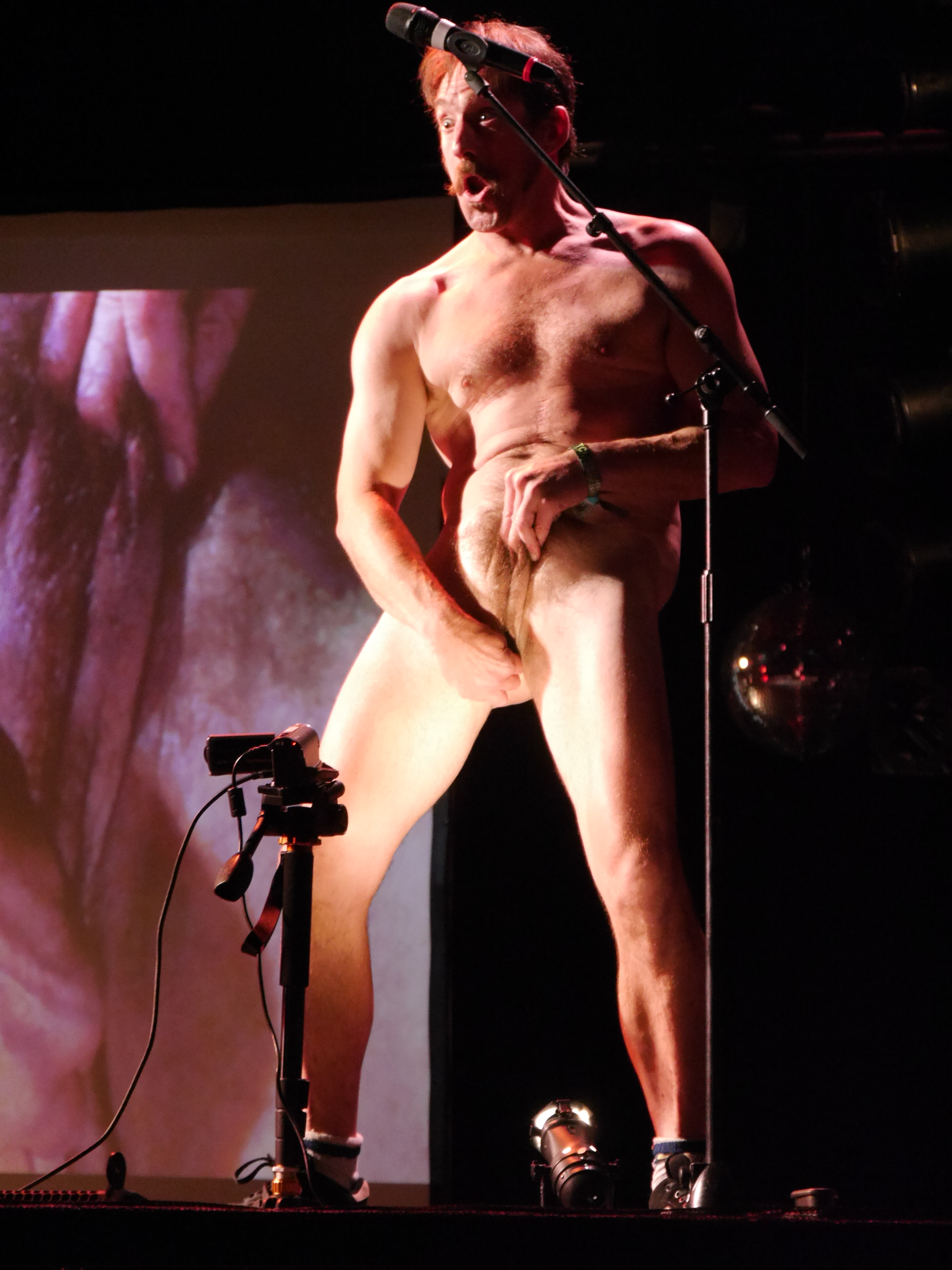
David Friend performing Puppetry of the Penis at the 2019 Glastonbury Festival

The run-time for the performance is approximately one hour. The main acts are preceded by a 25-minute stand-up comedy act, with varying comedians in different productions. The majority of the show features a series of 'tricks', which are manipulations of the actors' penises into various forms. The creators describe this as "genital origami". The contortions simulate commonly identifiable shapes, such as objects, architecture and people. The tricks include the Big Mac, the Loch Ness Monster, the wristwatch, the pelican, the Eiffel Tower, the hamburger, the bulldog, the windsurfer and others. The show consists of approximately 45 out of around 60 different genital manipulations, accompanied by sound effects and comedic narration.

The performers wear only sneakers and velvet magician's capes and stand with their backs to the audience. A large-screen live-action projection is used to allow audiences to view the acts close-up. The installations are projected, 20 times life size, onto an upstage screen for audience viewing. The show also includes a brief instructional demonstration for audiences to replicate the contortions, as well as an audience participation segment.

== Productions ==
=== Australian productions ===
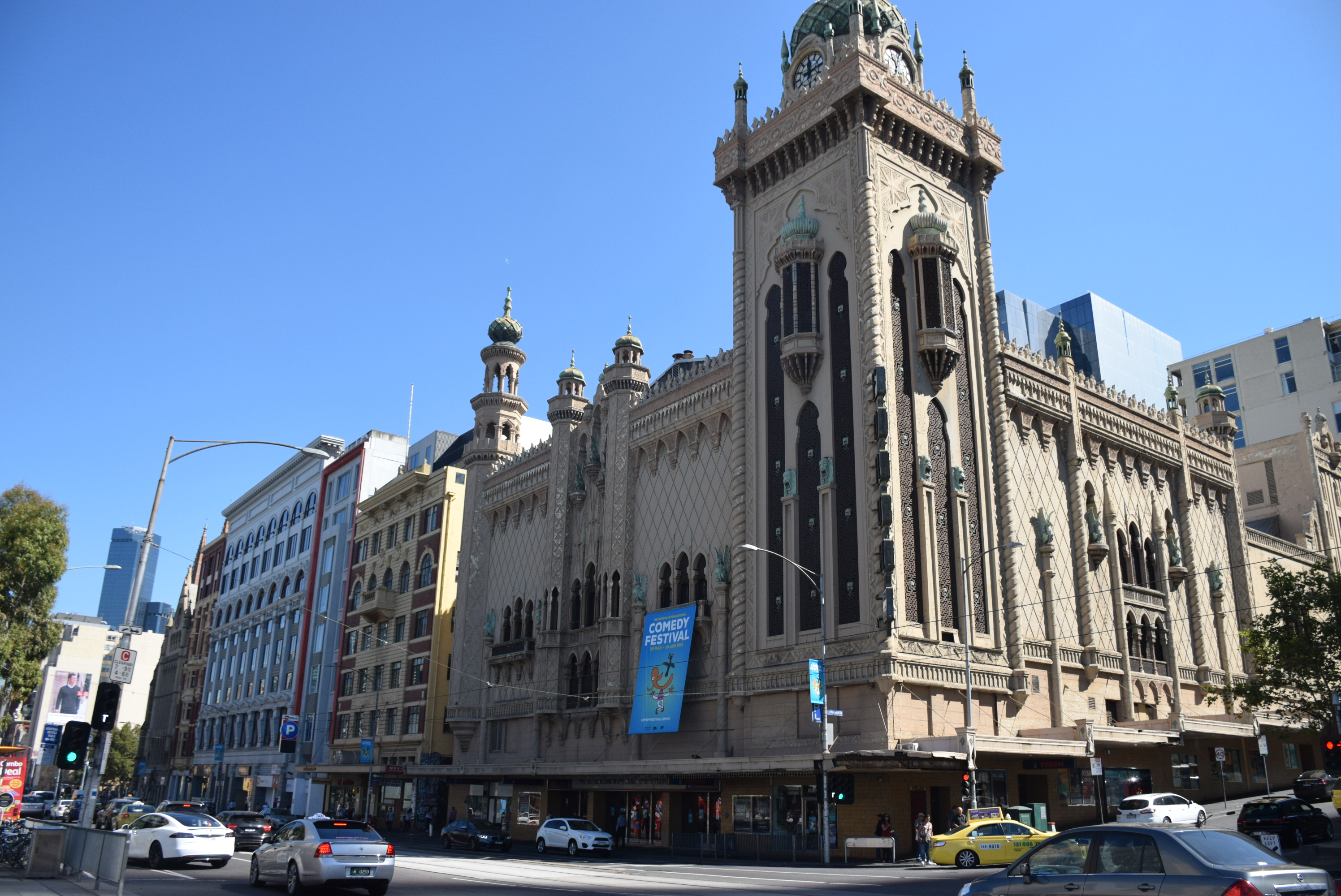
The Melbourne International Comedy Festival at the Forum Theatre, where Puppetry of the Penis debuted

The show debuted in 1998 at the Melbourne International Comedy Festival to sold-out audiences, where it won the "Outright Best Show" award. The success of the initial performance prompted an eight-month tour of Australia that covered 20,000 kilometres. The national tour was captured in the 2000 documentary Tackle Happy, directed by comedian Mick Molloy.

Puppetry of the Penis returned to tour Australia in March 2001, with a new cast consisting of Daniel Lewry, Steve Harrison and Jim MacGregor, under the management of Ross Mollison Productions. It ran from 30 March 2001 to 20 May 2001 at the Forum Theatre in Melbourne, hosted by the Melbourne International Comedy Festival. The tour continued in July at Her Majesty's Theatre in Adelaide and in October at the Footbridge Theatre at the University of Sydney. In 2002 Puppetry of the Penis performed at Riverside Theatre in Parramatta, the Playhouse Theatre in Canberra, the IMB Theatre in Wollongong, Tivoli Theatre in Bowen Hills, Brolga Theatre in Maryborough, Pilbeam Theatre in Rockhampton and Enmore Theatre in Sydney. The show appeared again at the Melbourne International Comedy Festival in April 2002, with performers Brett Hartin and Richard Sutherland. In 2003 Puppetry of the Penis was hosted in Armidale at the University of New England Arts Theatre and the Orange Civic Theatre in Orange before returning to the Melbourne International Comedy Festival in March 2003, with a new Director's Cut version of the production, featuring performers Brett Hartin and Aaron Bloomfield. The Puppetry of the Penis Director's Cut tour continued in Australia throughout 2003 and 2004, adding to the cast performer Barry Brisco from New York and featuring the return of Morley and Friend from their U.S. tour. The show briefly halted touring in Australia, temporarily reopening in April 2006 at the Canberra Theatre in Canberra and in March 2007 at the Enmore Theatre in Sydney. The show continued to perform each year at the Melbourne International Comedy Festival, hosted at the Athenaeum Theatre, produced by A-List Entertainment production company. In 2008 Puppetry of the Penis premiered at the Adelaide Fringe Festival at the Royalty Theatre, which has hosted the show in subsequent years.

=== Overseas productions ===
In 2000, the creators performed the show at the Edinburgh International Fringe Festival, which was positively received by audiences. The show was then booked by a West End producer for a five-week run at London's Whitehall Theatre, but numerous extensions led to the completion of a six-month tour in London's West End. This was followed by performances in New Zealand, Canada, the United States, Spain, Germany, Belgium, Italy, Portugal, Norway, The Netherlands, Argentina, Switzerland and Iceland.

In 2001, Morley and Friend licensed the show to local production company Mollison Productions, which produced seven supporting companies and a troupe of actors to assist with international performance demands and tours. On 5 October 2001 Puppetry of the Penis made its New York debut at the John Houseman Theatre on New York's 42nd Street. The show was produced Thomas Milazzo and Ross Mollison of Mollison Productions. The original creators, Morley and Friend, starred in the production, which featured an opening stand-up comedy act by Wendy Vousden. The production ran successfully for over a year, closing on 3 November 2002. After opening at the John Houseman Theatre Morley and Friend went on the Howard Stern Show for 16 minutes, and performed the hambuger, the snail, the Eiffel Tower, the Loch Ness Monster, the wind surfer and ended the appearance with the squashed rat.

In 2003, the duo licensed the show to Foster Entertainment in the U.S. Puppetry of the Penis, presented by David Foster of Foster Entertainment and Simon Morley, returned to New York's 42nd Street on 4 August 2009 at the Bleecker Street Theatre. The cast consisted of Rich Binning, Chris Cannon, Christopher Goodwin and Gavin Stewart, with opening acts by Rachel Feinstein, Giulia Rozzi and Amy Schumer. The show, originally intending to end on 30 August, extended its Off-Broadway engagement and ran until 4 October 2009. Bleecker Street Theatre hosted a subsequent 8 week run of the show from 13 July 2010 to 4 September 2010.

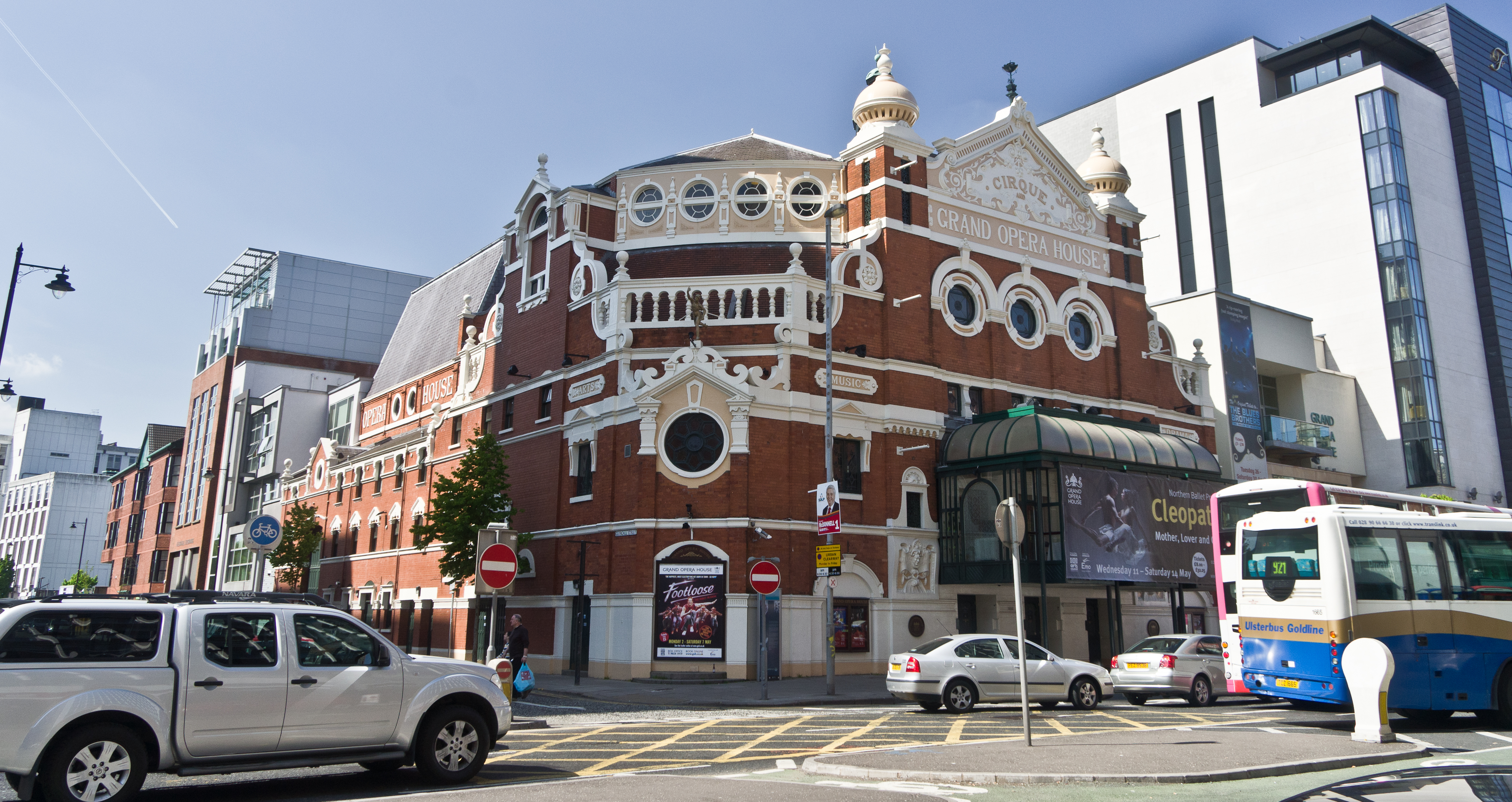
Puppetry of the Penis performed at the Grand Opera House theatre in Belfast, Northern Ireland

The production has also established a flagship show in Las Vegas, which runs up to five nights a week at the Erotic Heritage Museum. At one stage, the Puppetry of the Penis production managed eight franchises across the globe. The show has performed in a diverse range of venues during the course of its international tours. The UK tour included performances at the Grand Opera House in Belfast and the Arts Centre in New Milton. As of 2003, the show had played in over 15 private venues in the U.S., with the country-run theatre in Rosslyn being the first public arts facility in the country to host the show. Puppetry of the Penis has grossed over fifty million dollars, and performed in 35 countries in six different languages.

== Reception ==
Puppetry of the Penis has been noted for its controversial material amongst theatre critics and journalists. In a review of the production at the Whitehall Theatre in London, published in The Independent, Sarah Barrell said "[the show] is certainly one of the more playfully subversive pieces of theatre to come within reach of the capital's centres of power".

The show has received positive reviews from major international news outlets. Lyn Gardner of The Guardian called the production a "gently witty, surprisingly charming little show", and remarked that the material was handled with "a high degree of decorum". British critic Jill Sharp called the show a "theatrical extravaganza, celebrating with tongue-in-cheek innocence the flexibility of the phallus". The Washington Post noted the performers' "irrepressible wit… [they] will leave you laughing ridiculously".

Other reviews were less favourable, criticising the show for its sexually graphic subject material. Conservative art critic Roger Kimball of the New Criterion magazine called the production as "a juvenile example of the normalisation of deviance", likening it to toilet humour. Kimball said that the show was nothing more than a repulsive "publicity stunt".

== Controversy ==
=== Production bans ===
Performance shows outside the pornography industry that feature genitalia risk breaching obscenity laws, even when legitimatised as genuine works of art. The Puppetry of the Penis production employs practical measures, such as having performers stand with their backs to the audience, in order to avoid claims of public obscenity, and to enable the show to be performed in mainstream and civic theatres. In its production history, the show has faced bans from several international venues on the grounds of indecency.

==== New Zealand ====
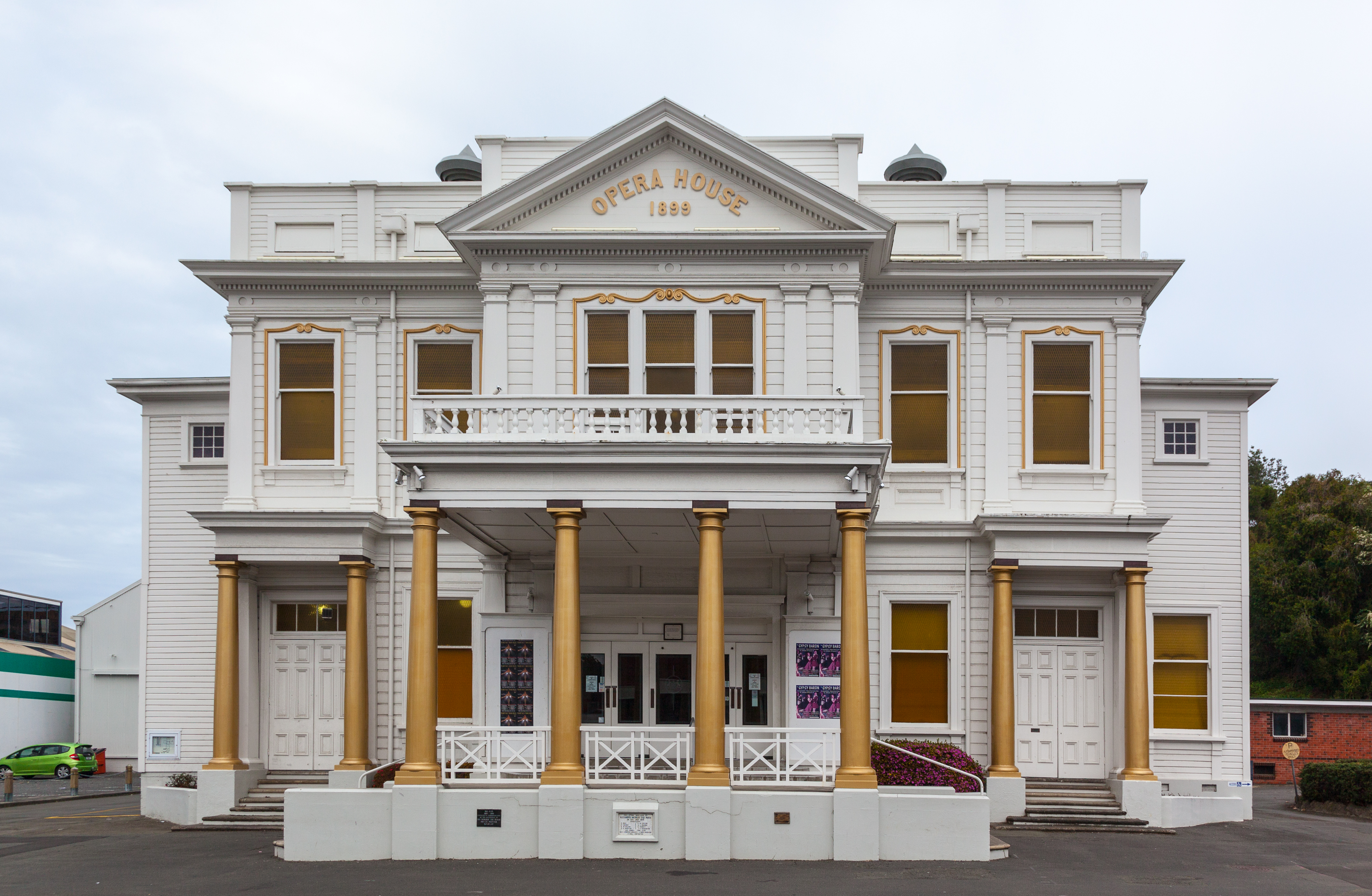
Puppetry of the Penis was banned from the Royal Whanganui Opera House in New Zealand

In May 2002, Puppetry of the Penis was banned from performing at the Royal Wanganui Opera House, New Zealand. The mayor, Chas Poynter, said "the community is aghast and upset about this show". While the council was not able to prohibit performances of the show in other venues in the municipality, city authorities retained the power to ban the production at the civic opera house.

==== Queensland ====
In June 2002, the show was barred from being staged in civic theatres in the Cairns and Bundaberg Councils in Queensland. Despite reviewing the ban at the request of Executive Producer Thomas Milazzo, the councils ultimately refused to allow the show to use their facilities. In regard to the decision, Bundaberg mayor Kay McDuff said the show was not "appropriate" for the Bundaberg civic theatres.

==== United States ====
In October 2002, Friend and Morley appeared as guests on The Tonight Show with Jay Leno to promote their U.S. tour. The U.S. television network NBC permitted the broadcast despite protests from religious groups. Due to controversies surrounding the show, Salt Lake City's NBC affiliate station, which is owned by the Church of Jesus Christ of Latter-day Saints, refused to broadcast the program.

In August 2004, during a U.S. tour of the production, Chicago Citizens for Community advocacy group filed a complaint, claiming that the show was "illegal and subject to law enforcement". The Chicago Police ignored protests to ban the performance.

=== Legal disputes ===
==== Broadcast indecency ====
The U.S. Federal Communications Commission investigated Puppetry of the Penis for broadcast indecency in 2002

On 4 October 2002, Morley and Friend were interviewed on KRON-TV's Morning News show to promote performances of Puppetry of the Penis in San Francisco. The duo appeared dressed only in capes and during the course of the live broadcast, one of the performers briefly exposed his penis. The Enforcement Bureau of the U.S. Federal Communications Commission (FCC) received a complaint from a viewer and launched an investigation into alleged television broadcast indecency. The FCC concluded that Young Broadcasting of San Francisco, KRON-TV's proprietor, was liable for a fine of $27,000 for violating federal restrictions regarding the broadcast of indecent material. This was the maximum fine for a breach of this nature. The Commission rejected Young Broadcasting's claims of bona-fide news coverage immunity, on the grounds that the puppetry "display was not incidental to the coverage of a news event". The station issued a press release apologising for the incident and paid the fee.

An early 2002 appearance by the duo on the Canadian comedy game show Gutterball Alley was also the subject of a complaint to the Canadian Broadcast Standards Council that year. The council concluded that the depictions of penises in the episode did not contravene its policies around nudity, as it was relevant and appropriate within the narrative context, but it found The Comedy Network culpable for not running a viewer advisory around the use of four-letter words in the dialogue.

==== Advertising standards ====
In February 2012, the Australian Advertising Standards Bureau received a complaint regarding a billboard advertising Puppetry of the Penis at the Twelfth Night Theatre in Bowen Hills, Brisbane. While the ad featured no nudity, the complainant protested the "thrusting of the male genital part into the public area". The ASB deemed the use of anatomical words acceptable in the context and the complaint was dismissed.

== Analysis ==
The use of comedy as a method of subverting or critiquing traditional assumptions and social dynamics has been commented on by several theorists. Puppetry of the Penis uses theatrical and absurdist humour to deconstruct conventional representations of male genitalia. The show reduces the penis to a malleable object for the purposes of comedy, disassociating it from the taboo of sex and masculinity. Theatre critic Joe Adcock wrote in his review of the performance, "The strictures of genteel decorum are violated. And so are the dogmas of smut."

Critics and academics note that Puppetry of the Penis possesses a cultural value beyond its outwardly superficial subject matter. The show demystifies and demythologises the male sexual organ by displaying it with hyper-visibility and boldness. In her book, Maria San Filippo states that displaying the penis "to spectacular effect ultimately renders it de-fetishized". She comments that in Puppetry of the Penis, the phallus is desexualised and separated from its traditional symbolic connotations, instead becoming purely a source of amusement.

Academic Elizabeth Stephens notes that Puppetry of the Penis represents a change in the "representability" of the penis, with its contortions rendering the organ as "humiliated, tortured or laughed at". She writes that while the penis is noticeably visible in the show, the phallus appears only in a distorted form, making it unrecognisable as a penis. According to Stephens, "this freakshow spectacularization of the penis, in which it becomes visible only to be constituted as an object of ridicule or amusement… represents anxieties about the role of the penis in the construction of masculinity". Stephens states that Puppetry of the Penis deconstructs traditional assumptions about the phallus and its symbolic attachment to masculinity.

Kovacs discusses the subversion of traditional phallic symbolism that Puppetry of the Penis presents in its performances. She comments that conventional representations of the penis allude to power, dominance and violence, and states that the show "challenges preconceived notions of the penis and its function as an object of sexuality and symbol of power". According to Kovacs, audiences are drawn to such productions as they challenge social norms and transfer taboo subjects from the private sphere "and into the social realm through the agency of humour".

== Adaptations ==
=== Book adaptation ===
The creators published an instructional book, entitled Puppetry of the Penis: The Ancient Art of Genital Origami, in 2000. It features photographs, accompanied by illustrations and text, demonstrating how to replicate 26 of the installations.

=== Director's cut ===
A Director's Cut version of the show was introduced at the Melbourne International Comedy Festival in 2003. It featured new performers Brett Hartin and Aaron Bloomfield, and showcased home videos from the United States tour of the production. Subsequent performances began with a multi-media presentation of the show's development over the previous decade. They included video footage of original creators Morley and Friend on tour, performance highlights, and audience reactions.

=== Documentary ===
The initial Australian national tour of Puppetry of the Penis was the subject of the documentary Tackle Happy, directed and produced by Australian comedian Mick Molloy. The documentary focuses on the creators, Morley and Friend, and their production journey. It showcases the complications that the duo experienced during this time, including legal disputes, backstage tension and the difficulties of prolonged touring. The documentary is interspersed with dialogue from comedian Tony Martin and director Mick Molloy.
