= Wade McElwain =

Canadian producer & comedian (born 1972)

Wade Christian McElwain (born June 1, 1972) is a Canadian television producer and comedian. McElwain created the first live, multi-platform trivia show, and is considered an innovator of second-screen, integrated content. He has won numerous international awards as a professional comedian.

== Early life ==
Wade McElwain was born in Mississauga, Ontario, to Mary (Hosier) and Harvie McElwain. At the age of 5, Wade and his older siblings brother Brad and sister Leslie moved to the rural area of Heidelberg where he lived in a predominantly Mennonite community.

Wade attended Waterloo-Oxford D.S.S. in Baden, Ontario where he distinguished himself as a member of the trivia challenge show Reach for the Top, where his team won the provincial championship and earned him a scholarship to the University of Western Ontario.

At Western, McElwain joined the Pi Kappa Alpha fraternity where he held the title of Social Director. McElwain was also a cartoonist for the Western newspaper The Gazette.

== Comedy ==
After finishing his degree, McElwain was on to law school until he decided to try his hand at stand-up comedy. His first time on stage in 1996 was at Yuk Yuk's "Crash and Burn Mondays".

In 2006, Wade moved to London, England, with his then-girlfriend Katherine Ryan.

McElwain moved away from traditional stand-up clubs to work as a speaker and lecturer performing "The Art of Comedy", a motivational strand he developed to teach professionals how to use the tricks employed by comedians to be more effective speakers. In 2011 he was hired by BBC Worldwide to form "Hand Jester Comedy", a development initiative to discover and nurture up and coming and overlooked comedians.

== Gutterball Alley ==
After a successful hour-long Comedy Now! special Wade was approached by the Comedy Network to come up with some ideas for his own show for the new network. He created Gutterball Alley, and along with executive producer and co-host Johnny Gardhouse they produced 29 episodes of the show.

It was one of the highest rated programs on the network and was recognized at NAPTE as one of the top original formats.

The show caught the attention of Lorne Michaels's Broadway Video who optioned the show for US release. The show was never picked up for season 3, despite a cult fan base.

== Travel shows ==
McElwain has worked on travel TV shows as both a host and producer. In 2004, Wade produced, hosted, and distributed Ultimate Destination, a humorous look at what rambunctious college kids do while on spring break. Thirteen episodes of the program were ordered by mentv, a digital channel, for CanWest media. It did find a home on the National Lampoon Network in the US as well as being syndicated to Turkey and Hungary. The show has found a following online with over 12.5 million views since 2010. In 2006 Wade hosted and produced "Hong Kong: Live It! Love It!" for Global TV, a travelogue following his top 10 list of things to do in Hong Kong.

== TV writing and production ==
Wade has written and produced over 400 original TV episodes, including; the gambling show "Double Down", Canada's "Gemini Awards", and the Canadian version of Who Wants to be a Millionaire. His trivia background led him to being the creative producer for the Comedy Network's "You Bet Your Ass." He was also a producer for Yuk Yuk's "Great Canadian Laugh Off" which also aired on the Comedy Network. Many of his shows use Ad Funded Programming to secure initial financing, and he has developed programming for the likes of Ford, Budweiser, NFL, NHL, and some tourism boards.

== Multi-screen programming ==
In 2011, Wade created, hosted, wrote and executive produced "Triviala Live" for triviala.com, the UK's largest trivia website. The program was the first in the world to use second screen engagement in which viewers could play along in real time for free of money. It aired for 30 hours live on Sky, and was recognized at the 2011 SXSW Interactive Festival for its integration of content and technology. In 2012 Wade was tapped by the likes of Big Earth Productions, & BBC Comedy to create content and technology that used programming that works across multiple devices and powered by TV. He lectures at media conferences at how this emerging technology can be successfully utilized.

== NFL in London ==
In 2011, Wade created the "NFL in London" which quickly became the largest NFL social group in Europe. He has been on TV for Channel 4, Channel 5, and Sky Sports, and has interviewed the likes of Roger Goodell, Bruce Smith, and Marshall Faulk. In 2010, he hosted the NFL International Series in London at Wembley Arena and Trafalgar Square.

== Gambling and gaming ==
McElwain has worked with numerous online gambling companies including William Hill, Paddy Power, 888.com, and Bodog.com to create live and online campaigns as well as TV concepts.

== Online content ==
He has worked as a consultant numerous online start-ups such as "Your Kinda TV", Bragster.com, Triviala.com, and online broadcasters.

== Personal life ==
Wade is a single father, and lives in London, England.
