= How to Be Alone (2009 film) =

2009 Canadian film directed by Andrea Dorfman

- Directed by: Andrea Dorfman
- Written by: Tanya Davis
- Produced by: Andrea Dorfman; Walter Forsyth
- Narrated by: Tanya Davis
- Music by: Tanya Davis
- Animation by: Andrea Dorfman
- Production company: Gorgeous Mistake Productions
- Release date: October 6, 2009 (VIFF)
- Running time: 5 minutes
- Country: Canada
- Language: English

How to Be Alone is a Canadian short film, directed by Andrea Dorfman and released in 2009. The film animates a spoken word piece by poet Tanya Davis about things that a person can do on their own after the breakup of a relationship.

The film premiered on October 6, 2009, at the Vancouver International Film Festival, and was subsequently broadcast on Bravo's Bravo!FACT Presents short film anthology series. In 2010 Dorfman uploaded the film to YouTube, where it quickly went viral, attracting over a million views in a matter of a few weeks.

In 2013 Davis released a book edition of the poem, with illustrations by Dorfman.

In 2020, Dorfman and Davis released the sequel film How to Be At Home, animating another spoken word piece about coping with isolation during the COVID-19 pandemic, as part of the National Film Board of Canada's The Curve series.
