= Tanya Davis =

Canadian singer-songwriter and poet

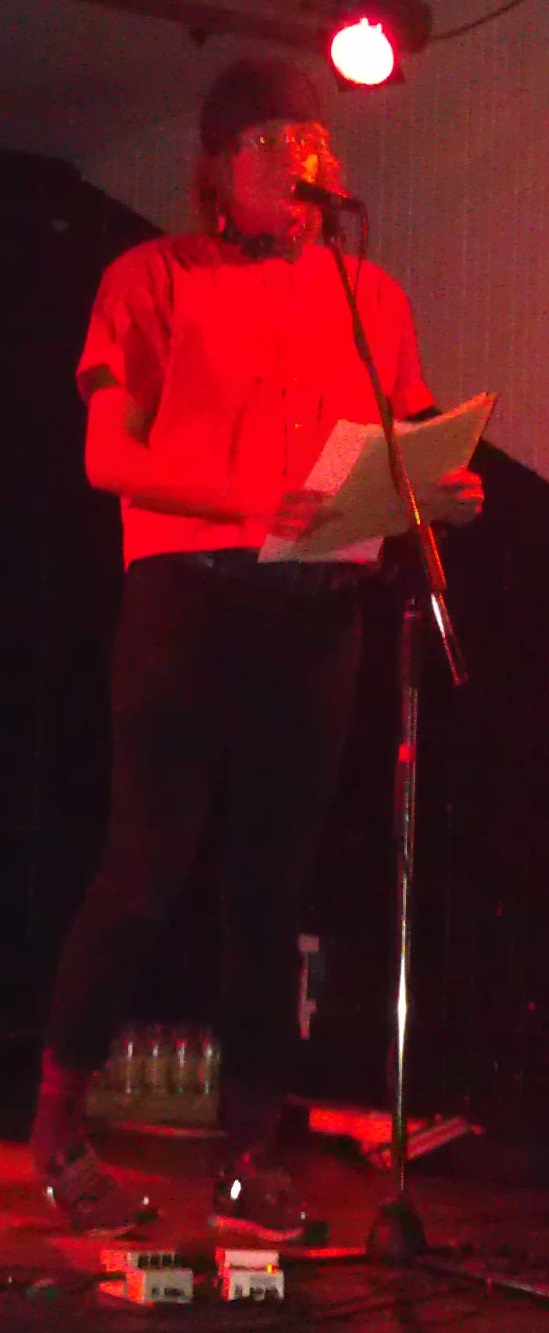
- Davis (2017)

Background information
- Origin: Summerside, Prince Edward Island, Canada
- Genres: Pop, folk, spoken word
- Occupations: Singer-songwriter, poet
- Years active: 2006–present
- Website: Tanya Davis

Tanya Davis is a Canadian singer-songwriter and poet, based in Prince Edward Island. Her style is marked primarily by spoken word poetry set to music.

== Background ==
Born in Summerside, Prince Edward Island, she moved to Ottawa for a time after high school to attend university, and then hitchhiked to British Columbia, where she worked in community development before moving to Halifax in 2005. She has since moved back to Prince Edward Island.

== Career ==
Shortly after moving to Halifax, Davis began performing spoken word poetry at various cafés in the city. She soon recorded an album, Make a List, which was nominated for Female Recording of the Year, Alternative Recording of the Year and Album of the Year at the Nova Scotia Music Awards, along with a nomination for Davis herself as New Artist of the Year, as well as four nominations for the MusicPEI Awards. She was named poet of the year in The Coast's annual year-end reader's poll for 2007.

She followed up with Gorgeous Morning in 2008.

She has toured across Canada and internationally as a poet and musician, both as a solo artist and with Jenn Grant.

Davis attracted international press attention in 2010 when How to Be Alone, an animated film directed by Andrea Dorfman illustrating a spoken word piece by Davis, became popular on YouTube. She subsequently released her third album, Clocks and Hearts Keep Going, in November 2010. The album was produced by Jim Bryson.

Davis authored a book of poetry titled At First, Lonely in spring 2011, published by Canadian publisher The Acorn Press. She also served as poet laureate of the Halifax Regional Municipality from 2011 to 2013.

In 2013, she wrote the poetic narration to Millefiore Clarkes' Island Green, a short documentary produced by the National Film Board of Canada about organic farming in PEI.

In 2014, she appeared in her first acting role, starring in Andrea Dorfman's film Heartbeat.

In 2020, Dorfman and Davis again collaborated on the short film How to Be At Home, based on another poem by Davis about coping with isolation during the COVID-19 pandemic in Canada. The film was named to the Toronto International Film Festival's year-end Canada's Top Ten list for 2020.

Davis was appointed poet laureate of Prince Edward Island on April 28, 2023.

== Personal life ==
Davis has stated in the press that she identifies as queer:

My sexuality is as fluid as my creativity. I don't sit firmly in the category of lesbian, but I don't sit firmly in poet or songwriter either. I love people for people. I think the way I love is queer.

== Discography ==
- Make a List (2006)
- Gorgeous Morning (2008)
- Clocks and Hearts Keep Going (2010)
