= Erotic Laser Swordfight =

Comedy show

Erotic Laser Swordfight is a one-person show by Canadian comedian/performer Sean Cullen. Erotic Laser Swordfight won the 2002 Canadian Comedy Award for Best One-Person Show. Steve Bennett of Chortle wrote that Cullen was "on top form" with a combination of stand-up and musical numbers, working in audience suggestions in "absurd steams of consciousness".
