= Polson Pier =

Entertainment complex in Toronto, Ontario, Canada

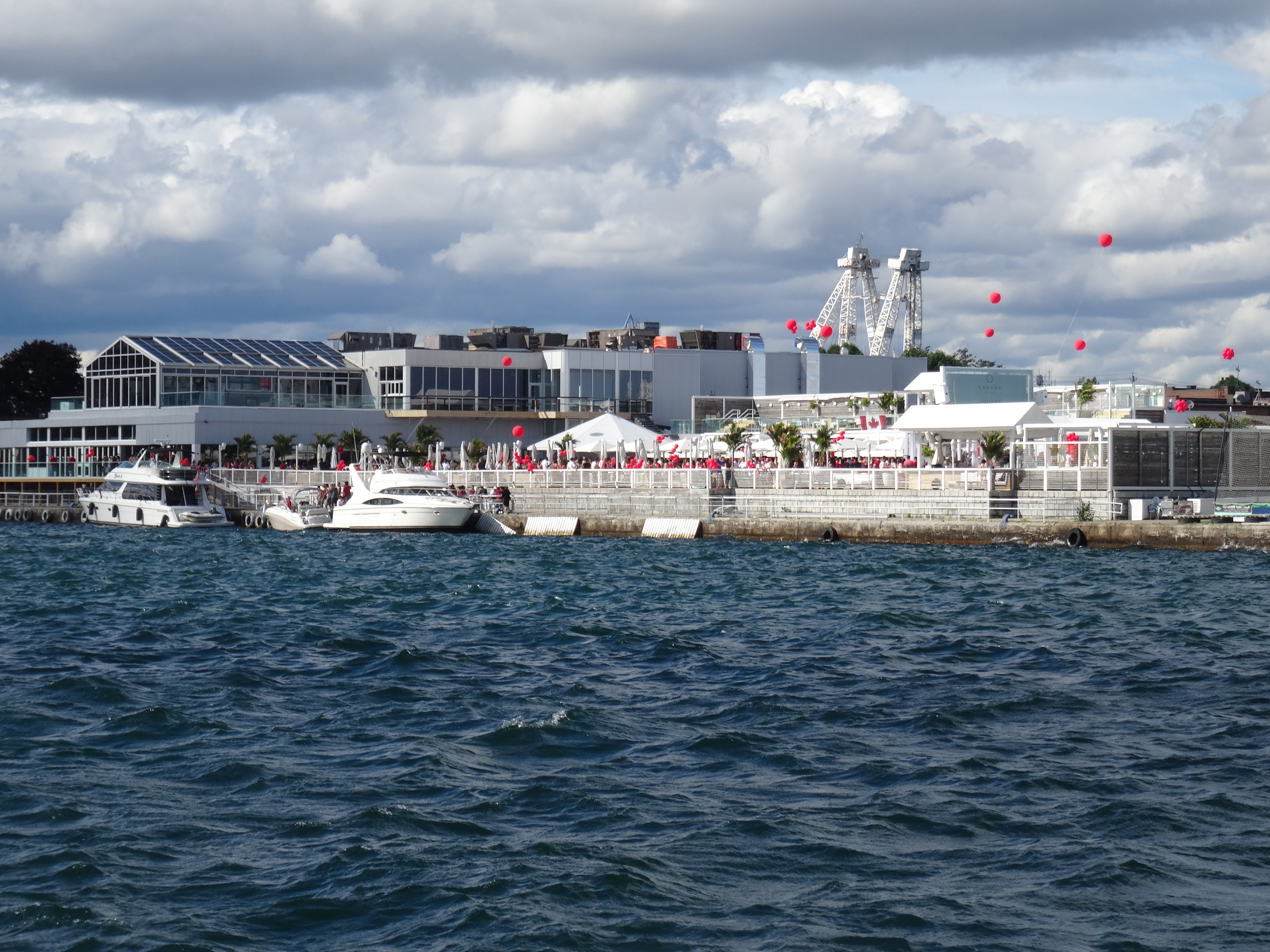
Polson Pier visible from the Empire Sandy.

Polson Pier, previously known as The Docks Waterfront Entertainment Complex (or simply The Docks), is a multi-purpose entertainment complex in Toronto, Ontario, Canada. It is located in the largely industrial Port Lands area of the city along the waterfront of Toronto Harbour. The site is also home to an amusement area, with facilities for swimming, beach volleyball, and a driving range. Until 2019, the site was also the only place in downtown Toronto to have go-karts, which has since closed permanently after failing to renew its contract from the landlord and Polson Pier.

Polson Pier is also home of the Rebel (formerly Sound Academy), a concert hall-nightclub. From 1999 to 2017 the site was converted into a drive-in theater at sunset. It was the only drive-in movie theatre in downtown Toronto. Open on summer weekends, the drive-in could accommodate up to 1200 people and 500 vehicles. The drive-in closed in 2017, with their final showing occurring on September 3. In 2020, during the COVID-19 pandemic in Canada, the parking lot of Rebel was converted back into a drive-in theatre, used as a venue for both music concerts and film screenings. It was one of the venues for the 2020 Toronto International Film Festival.

In 1999 there was discussion that ferries from the Toronto Ferry Services should depart from a landing at the Docks.

On July 24, 2006, the Alcohol and Gaming Commission of Ontario revoked the Docks' liquor licence. This was the culmination of a 10-year-long dispute with the Toronto Islands' residents regarding excessive noise. On July 28, 2006, the Court of Appeal for Ontario judge granted a stay, pending an appeal heard January 2007. By the summer of 2008, the complex had been sold to new owners who took measures to appease its neighbours, including ending all-night parties and soundproofing its indoor venue.

The complex lies between the Polson Slip to the north and the channel to Toronto's turning basin to the south.

== See also ==
- List of drive-in theaters
- Waterfront Toronto
- West Don Lands
