= Nadia Litz =

Canadian actress and director (born 1976)

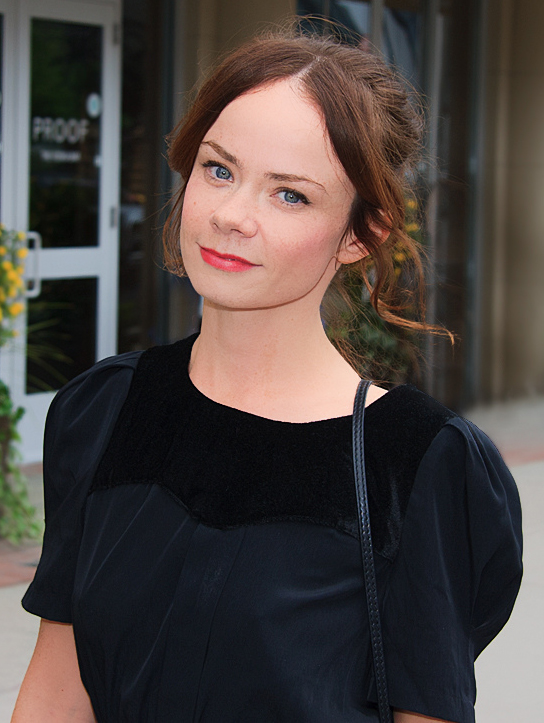
- Litz at the 2010 Toronto International Film Festival
- Born: December 26, 1976 (age 49); Winnipeg, Manitoba, Canada
- Education: York University

Nadia Litz (born December 26, 1976) is a Canadian actress and director.

== Early life ==
Litz was born in Winnipeg, Manitoba. A former child actor, she has described herself as somewhat ambitious. She is of Russian, Polish and British descent. She took an interest in films at the age of 6, and started living in Toronto at 17 to attend York University, but left to film The Five Senses. She also joined the 2,500 hopefuls who auditioned for the title role in the 1997 film version of Lolita, which went to Dominique Swain. She returned to York University to take film studies.

== Film career ==
Litz would go on to achieve a long acting resume, although she often received no money for her parts and instead chose projects she liked. In 1998 and 1999, she appeared in episodes of the Canadian television series Due South and Wind at My Back. She starred in Jeremy Podeswa's The Five Senses that screened at The Director's Fortnight in Cannes. She later received the title role in the short film Evelyn: The Cutest Evil Dead Girl (2002) by Brad Peyton. That year, she also appeared in the television film Salem Witch Trials as Mary Walcott (here called May Walcott), and has starred in films such as Rhinoceros Eyes (2003), Love That Boy, and Monkey Warfare (2006) for which she won a Vancouver Critics Award and You Are Here (2011).

Her honours have included being named by Maclean's magazine as "25 People Under 25 to Watch" for The Five Senses, and being nominated for a Gemini Award for acting in the television miniseries After the Harvest.

While studying film theory, Litz briefly considered law school as a "fallback career possibility," although the law degree would be used for film production and not to leave the film business. She explained to the press that "I work, but I work in independent films. There have been a few years that I have made a living and a few years that I haven't. It's a struggle for anyone trying to have a full-time career in film in Canada. Or anywhere."

Litz's graduating year she wrote, directed, shot and edited her first short film, on super 8 film called Remembering the Only Time I Tried to Stop My Heart from Failing (and Failed).

In 2009 she attended the prestigious Berlinale Talent Campus and studied under Janusz Kamiński and Tilda Swinton who were guest moderators. Later that year, she was accepted as a director-in-Residence to Norman Jewison's sought after program at the Canadian Film Center. There she directed the successful short film called How To Rid Your Lover Of A Negative Emotion Caused By You! which made its world debut at the Toronto International Film Festival in September 2010, described by The Style Notebook as "one of the best films at TIFF this year!"

Litz also directed the 2016 movie The People Garden which starred Dree Hemingway, Pamela Anderson and François Arnaud.

== Filmography ==
=== Film ===
Year	Title	Role	Notes
1997	Shift		Short film
1998	The Mighty	Girl in Diner	
1999	The Five Senses	Rachel Seraph	
1999	Teen Sorcery	Flo	Video
2002	Evelyn: The Cutest Evil Dead Girl	Evelyn	Short film
2003	Fear X	Ellen	
2003	Rhinoceros Eyes	Ann	
2003	Love That Boy	Phoebe	
2003	Public Domain	Terry	
2004	Some Things That Stay	Helen Murphy	
2006	Monkey Warfare	Susan	
2006	Black Eyed Dog	Carol	
2008	Blindness	Woman of Ward One	
2010	You Are Here	Marcie	
2012	Where Do We Go From Here	Abby	Short film
2014	Hotel Congress	Sofia	
2014	Big Muddy	Martha Barlow	
2022	Crimes of the Future	Dani Router	
2023	The Dead Don't Hurt	Martha Gilkyson	

=== Television ===
Year	Title	Role	Notes
1996	Hidden in America	Checker	TV film
1998	Due South	Girl	Episode: "Good for the Soul"
1999	Wind at My Back	Burlesque Bandit #1	Episode: "Public Enemies"
2001	After the Harvest	Jude Gare	TV film
2002	Salem Witch Trials	May Walcott	TV film
2011	King	Clara Gruen	Episode: "Amanda Jacobs"
