= Bob Sorger =

Canadian television director

Bob Sorger is a Canadian television director.

Sorger won the 2001 Canadian Comedy Award for his direction of the 2000 Canadian Comedy Awards special. He has been directing TV news broadcasts for over 20 years as well as numerous credits directing children's programming and comedy shows.

Sorger is currently living in Toronto, Ontario, Canada.
