= Parsley Days =

- Directed by: Andrea Dorfman
- Written by: Andrea Dorfman
- Produced by: Andrea Dorfman; Kimberly Boyd
- Starring: Megan Dunlop Michael LeBlanc; Marcia Connolly; Bruce Godfree Marla McLean
- Music by: Rob Benvie; Ian McGettigan
- Production company: A. D Pictures ltd
- Release date: September 12, 2000
- Running time: 84 minutes
- Country: Canada
- Language: English
- Budget: $65 000

Parsley Days is a Canadian feature film directed by Andrea Dorfman. The movie takes place in Halifax, Nova Scotia. The film premiered on September 12, 2000, at the Toronto International Film Festival. The film was named one of Canada's Top Ten by the Toronto International Film Festival Group in 2001. The movie stars Megan Dunlop, Michael Leblanc, Marla McLean, Marcia Connolly and Bruce Godfree.

== Plot ==
Kate (Megan Dunlop) is a bike-maintenance instructor who realized she is no longer in love with her boyfriend of five years, Ollie (Michael Leblanc). Kate and Ollie have been together since high school. Kate finds out she is pregnant, which complicates the whole situation because she is not sure if she truly does want to break up with Ollie or not. However, Kate does not want to have a baby, but does not want to wait weeks for a clinical abortion, so her herbalist friend, Chloe (Marcia Connolly), tells her that being on a parsley diet can make one have a natural abortion. Kate then goes on to constantly eat parsley and at one point in the film, even bathe in parsley. Ollie is "the king of contraception", where he counsels people on contraception for his job. Kate's friends see Kate and Ollie's relationship as the greatest relationship there could ever be and they envy her for it; even her lesbian friend thinks she would be crazy to leave him. Kate decides it is for the best not to tell Ollie about the pregnancy, despite her friends telling her she should. The film suggests that Kate may have had an affair with her "slow student" and may be the real reason why she wants an abortion. However, we find out that Ollie purposely poked holes in the condom, attempting to save their relationship together by having a child.

Kate ultimately decides that breaking up with Ollie and moving on is for the best. Kate and Ollie both agree to meet in ten years at the lake, which is the spot the two of them first fell in love in the first place.

== Cast ==
- Megan Dunlop as Kate
- Michael Leblanc as Ollie
- Marcia Connolly as Chloe
- Kenneth Wilson-Harrington as Jack
- Marla McLean as Lila
- Bruce Godfree as Slow student
- Noah Adilman as Noah
- Connie Eaton as Edna
- Vanessa Maximillian as Joleen
- Harvey Seasons as Frank
- Lisa Cormier as Taylor
- Shannon Cunningham as Pauline
- Tara Doyle as Jane
- Paul Gailiunas as Band Leader

== Development and production ==
The filming of Parsley Days was completed in only 11 days, which made for a tough schedule for everyone on board. The movie had a budget of $65,000. The majority of the movie was filmed in the North End of Halifax; the only scenes not filmed in the North End were the ones where Kate and Ollie are at the unnamed lake. Dorfman got her supporting cast from the Halifax independent music scene. Dorfman uses a style of filming where the characters and the audience have a sense of intimacy between them. The reason that Dorfman had the idea of using parsley to induce a natural abortion in the first place is that her friend was pregnant and tried to use parsley to end her pregnancy.

== Folk ==
Folk is the way in which something connects traditionally or culturally to the environment around it. Parsley Days has an element of folk as it presents real cultural elements of Halifax culture. These Haligonian elements include kindness toward one another, giving the best attempt at not hurting others, as well as seeing familiar faces all over the city and using the best method of transportation that suits your situation. Each of the elements are visible within the film, presenting a clear link to the real aspect of folk in the North End of Halifax.

== Magical Realism ==
Magical realism is the way in which a fictional situation can be represented alongside the real situation, possible to show a change in events or sequence of events, in the past, present or future. Parsley Days is one of many films that this element is present in. Magical realism is shown in the film in the way the main character, Kate, presents the different ways her life's dilemmas may play out. The films main example of magical realism is, when Kate is approaching a surprise party thrown in her honour, she plays out how the party could unfold in her mind, then enters and the real version plays out totally different.

== Soundtrack ==
The original score of the film was incidental music created by Rob Benvie & Ian McGettigan, of Thrush Hermit. The Music Supervision was done by Colin MacKenzie, of Cinnamon Toast Records and featured a roster of indie music from the Halifax & Canadian music scenes of the time, such as Sloan, The Heavy Blinkers, Piggy, The Inbreds, and Mike O'Neill.

The soundtrack of the film featured the following songs:

1. "Are We Waiting?" - Mike O'Neill
2. "I'm So Excited" - Mike O'Neill
3. "The Real Stuff" - Mike O'Neill
4. "Camera Shy" - Mike O'Neill
5. "Airplane" - Piggy
6. "She's Stepping Out" - Piggy
7. "Walking Through Air" - Piggy
8. "North Window" - The Inbreds
9. "Laying Blame" - Sloan
10. "Falling Bodies" - Slowlover
11. "Part His Rays" - Slowlover
12. "Falling Bodies (instrumental version)" - Slowlover
13. "All That's Left Are Waves" - The Heavy Blinkers
14. "Easy Living" - The Heavy Blinkers
15. "Petite Fille" - Rick Of the Skins
16. "Dressing Down" - The Heavy Blinkers
17. "The Longest Winter" - Julie Doiron And The Wooden Stars
18. "Early Morning Rain" - Jennifer Pierce, Andrew Glencross

== Critical reception ==
Parsley Days received mixed reviews. For example, The Globe and Mail titled the film "Endlessly Charming", as well as Eye Magazine saying the film was "well executed, but slightly over-earnest". Now newspaper said Parsley Days is often a delight to watch". As far as the reviews went from everyday people who viewed the film, the reviews were very mixed and in some instances went from one extreme to the other. For example, some viewers commented how they loved the movie, and it had been the best film they had ever see. While on the other hand, other viewers wrote of how they despised the film and any person who had not yet seen the film should avoid it at all costs. The reviews of the everyday people were pulled from IMDb and Rotten Tomatoes. Dorfman even says in an interview "I guess it's better to have a film that some love and some hate than one that everybody tolerates."

== Awards ==
- Best actress (Megan Dunlop) - Atlantic Film Festival
- Best cinematography - Atlantic Film Festival
- Best Canadian first feature (Andrea Dorfman) - Cinefest Sudbury
