= 19th Canadian Comedy Awards =

Awards ceremony for works of 2018

- Date: 4 June 2019
- Location: The Second City; Toronto, Ontario
- Country: Canada
- Hosted by: Ali Hassan

Highlights
- Most wins: Television: Baroness von Sketch Show (3); Film:Room For Rent (3); Internet: A Gay Victorian Affair (4); Person: Chanty Marostica and Matthew Atkinson (2)
- Most nominations: Television: Caution: May Contain Nuts (4); Film: Room For Rent (5); Internet: A Gay Victorian Affair (5); Person: Chanty Marostica (3)
- Artist of the Year: Catherine O'Hara
- Best Standup: Chanty Marostica
- Best Feature: Pogey Beach
- Best TV Show: Baroness von Sketch Show
- Best Web Series: A Gay Victorian Affair
- Website: www.canadiancomedyawards.org

The 19th Canadian Comedy Awards honoured the best live, television, film, and Internet comedy of 2018. Canadian Comedy Awards, also known as Beavers, were awarded in 22 categories, determined by votes from the public and industry members. The awards ceremony was held at Toronto's Second City on 4 June 2019, hosted by Ali Hassan.

Nominations were led by feature Room for Rent and web series A Gay Victorian Affair with five each. A Gay Victorian Affair won all four Beavers for web series, while Room for Rent won three in film and Baroness von Sketch Show won three in television. Chanty Marostica won for Best Stand-up and Comedy Album of the Year, and Catherine O'Hara was honoured as Comedic Artist of the Year.

== Ceremony ==
The awards ceremony was scheduled to be held on Sunday 2 June 2019 at the Yuk Yuk's comedy club in Toronto, Ontario, which had donated the use of its facilities. However, the club was not accessible and producers of the no-budget show sought another free venue, to accommodate a cast member of Generally Hospital who uses a power wheelchair. Generally Hospital addresses themes of disability, and its cast was nominated for Best Live Ensemble.

The awards ceremony was held at Toronto's Second City on 4 June 2019, hosted by Ali Hassan with presenters Ron Sparks, Kate Davis, Andrew Chapman, and Martha Chaves. The ceremony was executive produced by Kyra Williams, who had received the Roger Abbott Award at the 2014 ceremony.

== Winners and nominees ==
The Beaver was awarded in twenty-two categories. Only industry members could vote in the nine categories for best direction, performance and writing in features, TV series or specials, or web series. The other thirteen categories were open to public voting. Voting took place between 19 April and 10 May 2019.

Winners are listed first and highlighted in boldface:

=== Multimedia ===
Comedic Artist of the Year	Best Short
**Catherine O'Hara**; Chanty Marostica; Ken Hall; Ashley Botting; Sandra Battaglini	**Being Andy Serkis**; Spank the Monkey; Club Six; We Three Queens
Best Feature	Best Performance in a Feature
**Pogey Beach**; Kingsway; Room for Rent; Sorry for Your Loss; #Roxy	**Mark Little - Room for Rent**; Tommie-Amber Pirie - The Go-Getters; Mark McKinney - Room for Rent; Bruce Greenwood - Sorry for Your Loss; Pippa Mackie - #Roxy
Best Direction in a Feature	Best Writing in a Feature
**Matthew Atkinson - Room for Rent**; Jeremy Larter - Pogey Beach; Jeremy LaLonde - The Go-Getters; Michael Kennedy - #Roxy	**Matthew Atkinson - Room for Rent**; Aaron Abrams & Brendan Gall - The Go-Getters; Collin Friesen - Sorry for Your Loss; Tony Binns - #Roxy; Jeremy Larter, Jason Larter, Geoff Read, Robbie Moses - Pogey Beach
Best Comedy Album	Best Audio Show or Series
**The Chanty Show - Chanty Marostica**; Nincom2oop - Hunter Collins; Violently Nice - Ryan Dillon; Still Alive For The Holidays - The Williamson Playboys; Awkwarder - Mayce Galoni	**Because News**; Amy Matysio – Every Place is the Same; Michelle McLeod – Comic Stripped with Ben Miner; Thomas Middleditch – Vest of Friends Podcast; Yannick Bisson – Eat & Drink with Ali Hassan & Marco Timpano

=== Live ===
Best Live Production	Best Taped Live Performance
**A Sketch Comedy Extravaganza Eleganza** (Note: Extravaganza Eleganza is a sketch show with Tricia Black and Tom Hearn.); Entrances and Exits: An Improvised Farce; Bad Dog presents: HOOKUP; The Best Is Yet To Come Undone; Gossamer Obsessions: The Morality Puns	**Cassie Cao - 10 Minute Talk Show**; Hisham Kelati - 10 Minute Talk Show; Sugar Sammy - You're Gonna Rire; James Mullinger - Almost Canadian; Kathleen McGee - Hot Mess Gala Winnipeg Comedy Festival
Best Standup Comic	Best Breakout Artist
**Chanty Marostica**; Ted Morris; Rob Pue; Hoodo Hersi; Pete Zedlacher	**Kyle Brownrigg**; Natalie Norman; Nigel Grinstead; Jarrett Campbell; Adrienne Fish
Best Live Ensemble	Best Variety Act
**Cast of She The People**; Sex T-Rex; Cast of HOOKUP; Cast of Generally Hospital; Cast of A Sketch Comedy Extravaganza Eleganza	**Garrett Jamieson & Sprattacus**; 2-MAN NO-SHOW; Anesti Danelis; The Lady Show; Shirley Gnome

=== Television ===
Best TV Show	Best Performance in a TV Series
**Baroness von Sketch Show**; This Hour Has 22 Minutes; Caution: May Contain Nuts Season 4; Still Standing	**Alice Moran - Crawford**; Amy Matysio - Guilt Free Zone; Darrin Rose - Mr. D; Aimée Beaudoin - Caution: May Contain Nuts; Sheldon Elter - Caution: May Contain Nuts; Jonny Harris - Still Standing
Best Direction in a TV Series or Special	Best Writing in a TV Series or Special
**Jordan Canning, Jeremy LaLonde - Baroness von Sketch Show**; Sebastian Cluer - Still Standing – Tyendinaga Mohawk Territory, ON	**Carolyn Taylor, Meredith MacNeill, Aurora Browne, Jennifer Whalen, Jennifer Goodhue, Monica Heisey - Baroness von Sketch Show**; Peter McBain, Mike Allison, Scott Montgomery, Mark Critch, Dean Jenkinson, Susan Kent, Heidi Brander, Kevin Shustack, Sophie Buddle, Graham Clark, Jordan Foisy, Mayce Galoni, Ann Pornel - This Hour Has 22 Minutes; Matt Alden, Sheldon Elter, Howie Miller, Joleen Ballendine – Caution: May Contain Nuts; Jonny Harris, Fraser Young, Graham Chittenden, Steve Dylan - Still Standing

=== Internet ===
Best Web Series	Best Performance in a Web Series
**A Gay Victorian Affair**; Soul Decision Comedy; Learning Nature with Chris Locke; Note to Self - Season 2; My 90-Year-Old Roommate	**Amanda Barker - A Gay Victorian Affair**; Adrian Proszowski - A Gay Victorian Affair; Rakhee Morzaria - Note to Self (Season 2); Inessa Frantowski - The Amazing Gayl Pile: Apocalypse Soonish; Chris Locke - Learning Nature with Chris Locke
Best Direction in a Web Series	Best Writing in a Web Series
**Andrew Lamb - A Gay Victorian Affair**; Derek Horn - Learning Nature with Chris Locke; Sebastian Cluer - My 90-Year-Old Roommate – Cemetery Real Estate Agent; Brandon Lane - Miss Persona "Investigation Special"; Mike Fly - The Amazing Gayl Pile: Apocalypse Soonish	**Robert Watson - A Gay Victorian Affair**; Ethan Cole, Josh Shultz, David Lipson - My 90-Year-Old Roommate; Rakhee Morzaria - Note to Self; Brandon Lane - Miss Persona – "Investigation Special"

== Multiple wins ==
The following people, shows, films, etc. received multiple awards

Awards	Person or work
4	A Gay Victorian Affair
3	Room for Rent
2	Chanty Marostica
2	Matthew Atkinson

== Multiple nominations ==
The following people, shows, films, etc. received multiple nominations

Awards	Person or work
5	A Gay Victorian Affair
4	Caution: May Contain Nuts
4	Room for Rent
3	#Roxy
3	Baroness von Sketch Show
3	Chanty Marostica
3	The Go-Getters
3	Note to Self
3	Pogey Beach
3	Sorry for Your Loss
3	Still Standing
2	The Amazing Gayl Pile: Apocalypse Soonish
2	Matthew Atkinson
2	My 90-Year-Old Roommate
2	This Hour Has 22 Minutes
