= The Go-Getters =

2018 Canadian film directed by Jeremy Lalonde

- Directed by: Jeremy Lalonde
- Written by: Aaron Abrams; Brendan Gall
- Produced by: Jordan Walker
- Starring: Aaron Abrams; Tommie-Amber Pirie
- Cinematography: Cabot McNenly
- Edited by: Jeremy Lalonde
- Music by: Stephen Krecklo; Ian LeFeuvre
- Release date: March 2, 2018 (Cinequest)
- Running time: 83 minutes
- Country: Canada
- Language: English

The Go-Getters is a 2018 Canadian comedy film, directed by Jeremy Lalonde. The film stars Aaron Abrams and Tommie-Amber Pirie as Owen and Lacie, an aimless alcoholic and a prostitute in Toronto who form an alliance to raise $98 to pay for two bus tickets out of town; however, due to their shared penchant for self-defeating behaviour, this seemingly simple task proves more difficult for them to achieve than they planned.

The film's cast also includes Kristian Bruun, Christine Horne, Scott Thompson, Kate Hewlett, Jonas Chernick, Teresa Pavlinek and Ennis Esmer.

== Distribution ==
The film premiered on March 2, 2018, at the Cinequest Film Festival, where it won the award for Best Comedy Feature. and had its Canadian premiere at the Canadian Film Festival on March 20.

It opened commercially in Canadian theatres in December 2018.

== Critical response ==
Andrew Parker of TheGATE.ca positively reviewed the film, writing that "Those hip to what LaLonde and company are laying down will be treated to an uncompromising comedic work unlike anything that’s been attempted in Canadian cinema for quite some time. While LaLonde (How to Plan an Orgy in a Small Town, Sex After Kids) is no stranger to risque material, the sheer amount of manic, wall-to-wall misanthropy on display in The Go-Getters marks a quantum leap in his directorial chops and style, with the filmmaker making great use of split-screens and rapid fire editing that makes this feel like a heist movie for degenerates. Instead of working with more observational material, The Go-Getters is comprised of heightened situations, bizarre characters, and gross-out gags delivered like they’re coming out of a gatling gun. Once Owen and Lacie get going, there’s positively no stopping them."

Brad Wheeler of The Globe and Mail was more dismissive, writing that "even though this film is set within the world of the clownishly down-and-out in Toronto, it attempts to say something uplifting. If so, that something is very well disguised. The screenplay is lean and unsentimental, but takes us nowhere. I didn’t buy the resolution, if you can call it that."

== Awards ==
The film received three Canadian Comedy Award nominations at the 19th Canadian Comedy Awards in 2019, for Best Performance in a Feature (Pirie), Best Direction in a Feature (Lalonde) and Best Writing in a Film (Abrams, Brendan Gall).
