= Chris Locke (comedian) =

Canadian comedian and actor

- Occupations: Comedian, actor
- Years active: 2000s–present
- Spouse: Kathleen Phillips
- Awards: 2014 Canadian Comedy Award Best Male Stand-Up

Chris Locke is a Canadian stand-up comedian, actor, and podcaster, best known for his podcasting, live stand-up comedy and specials, as well as acting roles. Locke is often recognized across Canadian media, including CBC Television shows Mr. D and Run the Burbs.

== Biography ==
A native of Toronto, Ontario, Locke began his comedy career in the mid-2000s. He has performed at comedy festivals and undertaken his own solo tours.

Locke is the winner of the Canadian Comedy Award for Best Male Stand-Up at the 15th Canadian Comedy Awards in 2014.

He is married to comedian and actress Kathleen Phillips. They have two daughters.

== Podcasting ==
Locke hosted the podcasts Happy Good with Chris Locke and Utopia To Me. He co-hosts the podcast Evil Men with fellow comedians James Hartnett and Michael Balazo.

He is a frequent guest on Stop Podcasting Yourself.

== Comedy specials ==
Year	Title	Format	Release	Notes	Ref
2014	The World is Embarrassing	Album			
2016	Demons Are Eating My Head	Album			
2020	Chris and Seán are Tony and Keith in Nature	Album		With Seán Cullen	
2020	Chris and Seán are Tony and Keith in Horror	Album		With Seán Cullen	
2022	Captain Bones	Video	Crave (TV network)		
2026	Tiki Madness	Video	Macaw Studios		

== Filmography ==
In 2018, Locke premiered the Funny or Die comedy web series Learning Nature with Chris Locke. In the series, Locke attempts to create a nature documentary without any prior knowledge of nature. In 2019, the show was nominated in the 19th Canadian Comedy Awards for Best Web Series, and Locke was nominated for Best Performance in a Web Series.

At the 12th Canadian Screen Awards in 2024, Locke's performance in the Canadian film Who's Yer Father? received a Canadian Screen Award nomination for Best Lead Performance in a Comedy Film.

=== Film ===
Year	Title	Role	Notes	Ref
2010	Kelly 5-9	Jonny Caputo		
2011	America's Tallest Baby	Len Gorilla		
2012	Burger John's Breakfast Croissant Sandwich	Construction worker		
2014	Apartment 2B	Owen		
2014	Grilled	Thug		
2015	Sugar Sisters	Blake		
2015	Fat Camp	Steve		
2017	Sundowners	Randy		
2017	Filth City	Det. Ray Zitt		
2021	Drifting Snow	Jordan		
2023	Who's Yer Father?	Larry Constable	Nominated at the 12th Canadian Screen Awards	

=== Television ===
Year	Title	Role	Notes	Ref
2008	The Border	Karl	Episode: "Nothing to Declare"	
2009	The Latest Buzz	Gus	Episode: "The Kiss Off Issue"	
2011	Goodbye Sara Hennessey	Chris	Episode: "Sara Gets Maternal"	
2011	My Babysitter's a Vampire	Delivery Guy	Episode: "The Brewed"	
2012	The L.A. Complex	Improv Class Student	Episode: "Home"	
2014	The Ron James Show		Episode #5.2	
2014	Annedroids	Meteor Hunter	Episode: "Eyes on the Skies"	
2015	The Strain	Louis	Episode: "Identity"	
2015–2016	Mr. D	Ted	4 episodes	
2016	The Nations!	Self		
2016	True Dating Stories	Hannah's Date	Episode: "Hannah"	
2016	The Amazing Gayl Pile	Broken Man	Episode: "Finding Jerry"	
2016–2019	Baroness von Sketch Show	Multiple roles	7 episodes	
2017	Epic Studios	Homeless Guy		
2017	The Beaverton	Todd	Episode #2.6	
2018	Learning Nature with Chris Locke	Self	Host	
2019–2021	TallBoyz	Multiple characters	4 episodes	
2020	Workin' Moms	Charlie	Episode: "Charlie and the Weed Factory"	
2020	Short Term Sentence	Stevie	TV series	
2020	Mrs. America	Pie Kill Agent	Episode: "Bella"	
2020	Odd Squad Mobile Unit	Dr. Dry	Episode: "Odd in 60 Seconds/Villain Networking"	
2020–2021	Odd Squad	Dr. Dry	2 episodes	
2021	The Communist's Daughter	Rod Bigmann	6 episodes	
2021	What We Do in the Shadows	Dean Martin	Episode: "The Casino"	
2022	Transformers: BotBots	Eye-Goon		
2022	Doomlands	Jackie	Episode: "Tastes of the Wastes"	
2022	The Kids in the Hall	Guy	Episode #1.3	
2022	CBC Winnipeg Comedy Festival	Self	Episode: "You Do You"	
2022–2023	Children Ruin Everything	Contractor	2 episodes	
2022–2024	Run the Burbs	Sebastian	21 episodes	
2023	Gary and His Demons	Trench Coat Salesman	Episode: "The Imaginary Friend"	
2024	The Umbrella Academy	Rolfe	Episode: "The Squid and the Girl"	
2025	Wayward	Chad	Episode 7: "Ascend"	
2026	Small Achievable Goals	Robert	Season 2, Episode 3: "Meno-Junk"	
