= Farpoint Films =

Canadian production company, founded 2000)

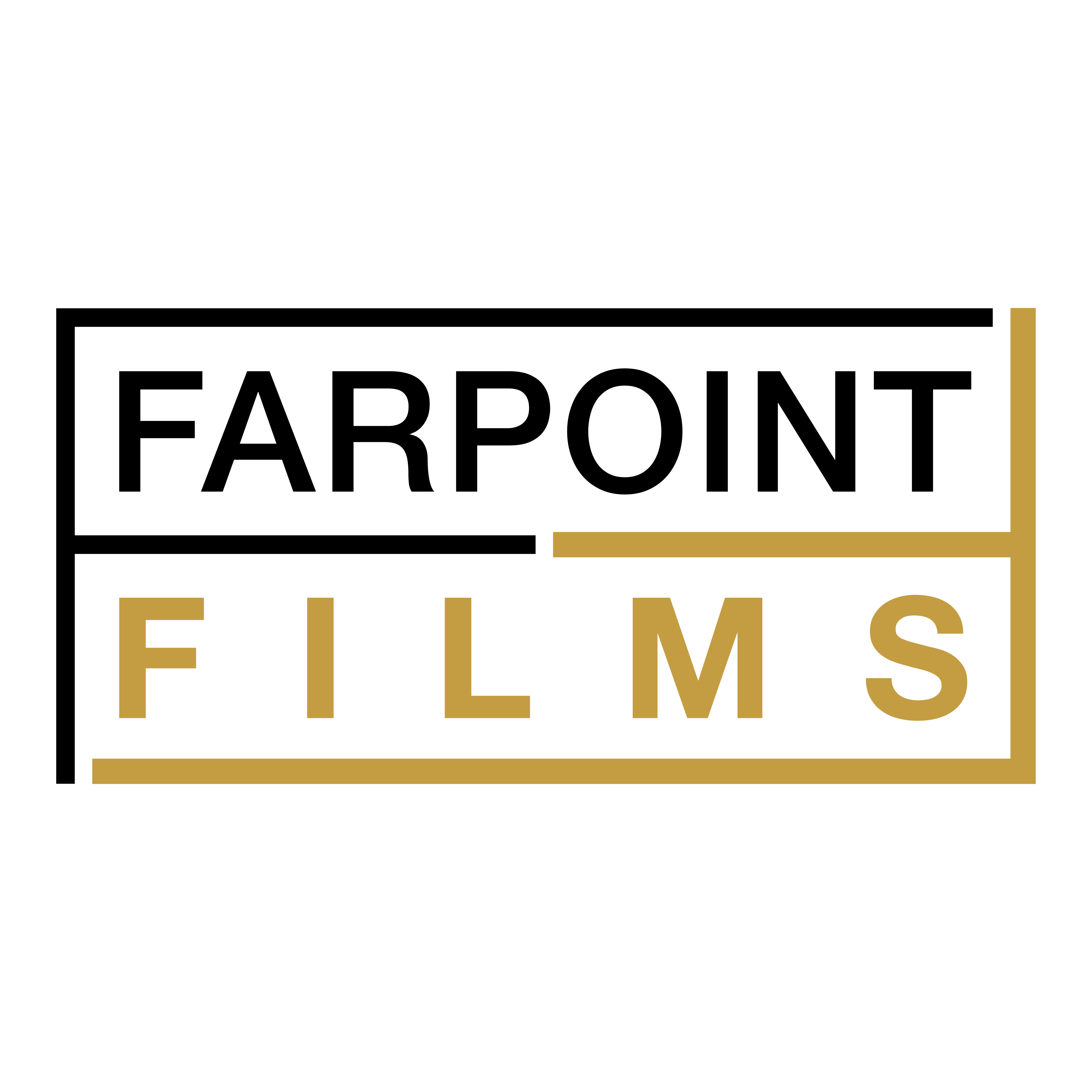
- Industry: Film and Television
- Founders: John Barnard & Kyle Bornais
- Headquarters: Winnipeg, Canada
- Key people: Chris Charney, Scott R. Leary, Markus Henkel and Trevor Suffield
- Divisions: Farpoint Distribution
- Website: www.farpointfilms.com

Farpoint Films is a television and film production company founded in 2000 by John Barnard and Kyle Bornais and based out of Winnipeg, Manitoba, Canada. They have produced more than 500 hours of national and international award winning television and film projects. Productions include Room for Rent, Sorry for Your Loss, From the Vine, The Illegal Eater, Escape Or Die! and The Medicine Line.

== Filmography ==
=== Film ===
Year	Title	Notes
2009	Wild Cherry	
2010	Mother's Day	
2010	We're The Weakerthans, We're From Winnipeg	Documentary film
2010	Drop the Nickel	Documentary short film
2010	A Fable About Beauty	Short
2011	The Paper Nazis	Documentary short
2012	The Sheepdogs Have At It	Documentary
2012	Champion City: The 1896 Winnipeg Victorias	Documentary short
2014	Teen Lust	
2014	Lost Heroes	Documentary
2014	Randy Bachman's Vinyl Tap: Every Song Tells A Story	Documentary
2016	Menorca	
2017	Room for Rent	
2018	Bachman	Documentary
2018	Sorry for Your Loss	
2018	The Perfect Match	
2018	Love, Of Course	
2019	From the Vine	
2022	Seeking Fire - In Production	Documentary
2022	Strong Son - In Pre-Production	
2022	Wintertide - In Post Production	
2022	Vandits	
2022	The Swearing Jar	
2023	Blood	
2024	Levels	

=== Television ===
Year	Title	Notes
2005	Sierra's Song	Documentary short
2007	There's Something Out There	Documentary TV film
2007	Warriors TKO	Documentary series
2008	House Party	Comedy series
2009	Winnipeg Burlesque	TV movie
2009	Willy's Garage	TV documentary short
2010	Musical Ghosts	TV documentary movie
2010	Lost Bones: In Search Of Sitting Bull's Grave	TV documentary movie
2011	Book of Vaudeville	TV documentary movie
2013	The Illegal Eater	Lifestyle series
2014	The Medicine Line	Documentary series
2015	Escape or Die!	Documentary series
2017	Kid Diners	Lifestyle series
2018	My Misdiagnosis	Documentary series
2019–2021	Cruise Ship Killers	True crime, 2 seasons
2019	I Hostage	Documentary series
2019	Alive	Documentary series
2020–2022	Ice Vikings	Documentary, 3 seasons
2020	The Day My Job Tried To Kill Me	Documentary series
2021	Disaster Déjà vu	Documentary series
2021	Dying to be Famous: The Ryan Singleton Mystery	True crime series
2022	Sunshine Slayings -	in production
2022	Shoot To Kill	in post production
2022	Heartland Homicide	True crime series

== Awards ==
Year	Production	Awards	Category	Nominee	Result
2001	The Gypsy Moon Circus Show	Blizzard Awards	Best Editing: Non-Dramatic	John Barnard	Won
2003	Cemetery Love Story	Blizzard Awards	Best Direction: Drama Short	John Barnard	Won
2007	Gorilla Trap	Accolade Awards	TV Short Documentary		Won
2009	Lost Bones: In Search Of Sitting Bull's Grave	Hugo Television Awards	Best Documentary History/Biography		Won
2009	Lost Bones: In Search Of Sitting Bull's Grave	Accolade Awards	Award Of Excellence		Won
2010	Winnipeg Burlesque	Derby City Film Festival	Best Documentary Film		Won
2013	The Sheepdogs Have At it	Tenerife International Film Festival	Best Directing of a Feature Documentary Series	John Barnard	Won
2014	The Illegal Eater	Banff World Media Festival	Best Lifestyle Series		Won
2014	The Medicine Line	Yorkton Film Festival	Best Documentary Series		Won
2016	Escape Or Die!	Yorkton Film Festival	Best Documentary Series		Won
2017	Room for Rent (Note: Room For Rent won awards at two 2017 film festivals, a 2018 film festival and for its 2018 theatrical release)	LA Comedy Festival	Best Film		Won
2017	Room for Rent	LA Comedy Festival	Best Screenplay	Matthew Atkinson	Won
2017	Room for Rent	LA Comedy Festival	Best Actor	Brett Gelman	Won
2017	Room for Rent	Chicago Comedy Festival	Best Feature		Won
2017	Room for Rent	Chicago Comedy Festival	Best Actress	Stephnie Weir	Won
2017	Menorca	UBCP / ACTRA Awards	Best Actress	Tammy Gillis	Won
2017	Menorca	Black Sea Film Festival	Best Narrative Feature		Won
2017	Menorca	Black Sea Film Festival	Best Actress	Tammy Gillis	Won
2017	Menorca	Western Canadian Music Awards	Visual Media Composer Of The Year	Mitch Dorge	Nominated
2017	Menorca	Solaris Film Festival	Best Director	John Barnard	Won
2017	Menorca	Solaris Film Festival	Best Actress	Tammy Gillis	Won (tie)
2017	Menorca	Windy Awards	Best Sound Design	Mitch Dorge	Won
2017	Menorca	Windy Awards	Best Production Design	Gord Wilding	Won
2017	Menorca	Windy Awards	Best Cinematography	Markus Henkel	Won
2017	Menorca	Windy Awards	Best Feature Length Film		Won
2017	Menorca	Noida International Film Festival	Best Actress	Tammy Gillis	Won
2018	Bachman	Gimli Film Festival	Audience Choice Award		Won
2018	Room for Rent	Canadian Film Festival	Best Feature		Won
2018	Room for Rent	Canadian Film Festival	Best Set Design	Gord Wilding	Won
2018	Room for Rent	Canadian Comedy Awards	Best Direction	Matthew Atkinson	Won
2018	Room for Rent	Canadian Comedy Awards	Best Writing	Matthew Atkinson	Won
2018	Room for Rent	Canadian Comedy Awards	Best Performance	Mark Little	Won
