= Sorry for Your Loss (film) =

2018 Canadian film

- Directed by: Collin Friesen
- Written by: Collin Friesen
- Produced by: Kyle Bornais; Tony Wosk
- Starring: Justin Bartha; Bruce Greenwood; Inbar Lavi; Kevin McDonald
- Cinematography: Charles Lavack
- Edited by: Joni Church
- Music by: Shawn Pierce
- Production companies: Farpoint Films; Middle Child Films
- Distributed by: Incendo Productions
- Release date: September 21, 2018 (CIFF)
- Running time: 100 minutes
- Country: Canada
- Language: English

Sorry for Your Loss is a 2018 Canadian black comedy film, directed by Collin Friesen.

The film stars Justin Bartha as Ken Wall, a frustrated marketing executive who is ambivalent about the fact that his wife Lori (Inbar Lavi) has just given birth to their first child. When he receives news that his father has died, he travels home to Winnipeg for the funeral with hopes of inheriting money he can use to quit his job and pursue his dream of opening his own gastropub, only to learn upon arrival that his father's will stipulates that he will only inherit the money if he successfully scatters his father's ashes in the middle of IG Field.

The cast also includes Bruce Greenwood as Jeff Steadman, the executor of Ken's father's will; Kevin McDonald as Ken's father's lawyer Vince Kendall; and Lolita Davidovich as Ken's mother Eve. Sandrine Holt and Darrin Rose also appear in supporting roles.

The film was shot in Winnipeg in 2017, and premiered at the Calgary International Film Festival in 2018. It opened commercially in May 2019.

== Critical response ==
Andrew Parker of TheGATE.ca gave the film a mixed review, writing that "Sorry for Your Loss is the kind of movie where one can see that the actors are seasoned and well directed, but that not much thought was put into how the film itself should function visually or emotionally." He praised the main performances, writing that "whenever Bartha is paired alongside Greenwood or Lavi (which is thankfully frequent), Sorry for Your Loss gives a hint of what this could’ve been like with a more thoroughly workshopped script."

For Original Cin, Jim Slotek wrote that "In Sorry for Your Loss, a pretty sizable character transformation must happen in the course of 90 minutes. A Christmas Carol notwithstanding, it’s hard to imagine any single experience, no matter how transformative, that can turn you from someone who is “dead inside” to someone who stops and smells the roses. It’s pure expediency, and a bit of a character cheat, rendering the ending unsatisfying and too neat. That said, Sorry for Your Loss is an entertaining, banter-filled take on the straight-line from our parents to ourselves, one that grows on you after viewing.

FilmInk praised the film for its heartfelt exploration of grief and the human experience. It commends the strong performances, particularly from the lead actors, and notes the film's ability to balance poignant moments with a touch of humor. The reviewer highlights the well-crafted narrative that delves into the complexities of loss, family dynamics, and personal growth. The film is described as emotionally resonant and thought-provoking, offering a genuine and authentic portrayal of the grieving process. Overall, the review suggests that "Sorry for Your Loss" is a touching and well-executed film that effectively navigates the delicate terrain of loss and healing.

== Awards ==
The film received three Canadian Comedy Award nominations at the 19th Canadian Comedy Awards in 2019, for Best Feature Film, Best Performance in a Feature Film (Greenwood) and Best Writing in a Feature Film (Friesen).
