= Who's Yer Father? =

2023 Canadian comedy film

- Directed by: Jeremy Larter
- Written by: Jeremy Larter
- Produced by: Jason Arsenault; Jeremy Larter; Jenna MacMillan
- Starring: Chris Locke; Susan Kent
- Cinematography: Kevin A. Fraser
- Edited by: Patricia Brown; Jeremy Larter
- Production company: 63 Lights Entertainment
- Distributed by: Levelfilm
- Release date: September 16, 2023 (AIFF)
- Running time: 110 minutes
- Country: Canada
- Language: English

Who's Yer Father? is a 2023 Canadian crime comedy film, written, produced, and directed by Jeremy Larter. The film stars Chris Locke as Larry Constable, a bumbling private investigator in a small Prince Edward Island town who teams up with convenience store owner Rhonda Perry (Susan Kent) to investigate a black market lobster smuggling ring.

The cast also includes Jess Salgueiro, Matt Wells, Kaniehtiio Horn, Steve Lund, Marc Hickox, Graham Putnam, Kinza Baker, Robbie Moses, Linda Wigmore, Danielle M. Villard and Sharlene MacLean.

The film entered production in August 2022, with funding assistance from Prince Edward Island's new Film Production Fund. Larter had written the screenplay in 2015, but set it aside to work on other projects, most notably his 2019 film Pogey Beach, before returning to it in the early 2020s.

The film premiered at the 2023 Atlantic International Film Festival, and was screened at the 2023 Cinéfest Sudbury International Film Festival.

== Awards ==
Kent won the Joan Orenstein & David Renton Award for Outstanding Performance in Acting at the 2023 Atlantic International Film Festival.

Kent and Locke both received Canadian Screen Award nominations for Best Lead Performance in a Comedy Film at the 12th Canadian Screen Awards in 2024, and Fatema Hoque was nominated for Best Makeup.
