= The Nations! =

- Genre: Comedy, Travel
- Directed by: Jay Ferguson
- Starring: Seán Cullen; Jarred Christmas
- Countries of origin: Canada, New Zealand
- Original language: English
- No. of seasons: 1
- No. of episodes: 10

Production
- Executive producers: Catherine Tait; Jonas Diamond
- Producer: Lisa Baylin
- Running time: 6 minutes
- Production companies: iThentic thedownlowconcept

Original release
- Network: CBC Television; Television New Zealand
- Release: 29 February 2016

The Nations! is a Canadian/New Zealand digital comedy/reality competition series starring Sean Cullen and Jarred Christmas. It premiered on CBC Punchline and Television New Zealand on 29 February 2016.

== Plot ==
The Nations is a comedic take on the travelogue, where two comedian hosts travel each of their respective nations, discussing which one is better on a variety of topics. Hosted by Sean Cullen (Canada) and Jarred Christmas (New Zealand), the series looks at strange facts and locations from each country, focusing on food, drinks, politics, etc. The interactive website that accompanies the digital series allows users to vote on the 'winner' of each episode, while also competing against other users by partaking in quizzes, games, and more, culminating in the final decision of which nation is the best. The winning nation has yet to be announced.

== Guest appearances ==
- Rob Ford – Former Mayor of Toronto
- Don Newman – Broadcast journalist
- Jacinda Ardern – Labour Party MP
- Meghan Agosta – Hockey player, Canada women's national ice hockey team
- Noah Cantor – Former football player, Canadian Football League
- Jill Barber - Musician
- Villainy - Band
- Kings - Musician
- Chris Locke - Comedian
- Allison Price - Comedian
- Cassie Moes - Comedian
- Pax Assadi - Comedian
- Dr. Jess O'Reilly - Sexologist

== Episodes ==
No.	Title	Directed by	Original release date
1	"Food"	Jay Ferguson	29 February 2016
The hosts explore the best gastronomy: Montreal's smoked meat sandwiches and Wellington's fish and chips are compared before a competition for the best steak where Wellington's Logan Brown and Halifax's Brooklyn Warehouse face-off.
2	"Extreme"	Jay Ferguson	29 February 2016
Seán and Jarred explore the extreme sports popular in each country, including white water rafting in Ottawa and bungee jumping off Auckland's Sky Tower.
3	"Wildlife"	Jay Ferguson	29 February 2016
Canada's wildlife is exhibited at Quebec's Omega Park and fishing at Peggys Cove, Nova Scotia, while a tour through New Zealand's Zealandia reveals the takahē, once thought to be extinct.
4	"Politics"	Jay Ferguson	29 February 2016
Canadian politics are explored through former broadcast journalist, Don Newman, and infamous former Mayor of Toronto, Rob Ford. Meanwhile, Labour Party MP Jacinda Ardern discusses some weird moments in New Zealand politics.
5	"Sports"	Jay Ferguson	29 February 2016
Which sport is more intense, Hockey or Cricket? Football or Rugby? Seán and Jarred both try out the other nation's toughest sports with guest appearances from Canadian sports luminaries, Meghan Agosta and Noah Cantor.
6	"Scary"	Jay Ferguson	29 February 2016
Seán and Jarred look into the scary histories of their nations, including a haunted jail turned into a hostel in Ottawa and an asylum turned into a theme park in Auckland. Along the way they stop into a giant apple and Weta Digital.
7	"Comedy"	Jay Ferguson	29 February 2016
Seán and Jarred try to find out which nation is funnier by going to Toronto’s Comedy Bar, Ottawa's Absolute Comedy and VK's Comedy Bar in Wellington, featuring Chris Locke, Allison Price, Cassie Moes and Pax Assadi.
8	"Romance"	Jay Ferguson	29 February 2016
To find out which country is more romantic, Seán and Jarred talk to Canadian sexologist Dr. Jess O'Reilly and go glamping in New Zealand's Bethells Beach.
9	"Drinks"	Jay Ferguson	29 February 2016
Which nation drinks harder, Canada or New Zealand? Seán and Jarred visit the Villa Maria Estates and Vancouver's Gerard Lounge to find out.
10	"Music"	Jay Ferguson	29 February 2016
Seán and Jarred talk to Canada's Jill Barber and New Zealand's Villainy to find out which country has better music, though the competition ultimately involves a national anthem sing-off, including a dubstep remix of New Zealand's God Defend New Zealand.
