= Out (2013 film) =

2013 Canadian short film

- Directed by: Jeremy LaLonde
- Written by: Jeremy LaLonde
- Produced by: Shane Azam; Jackie English
- Starring: David Tompa; David Huband; Rosemary Doyle; Paula Brancati; Tommie-Amber Pirie
- Cinematography: Shane Azam
- Edited by: John Nicholls
- Production company: The Splinter Unit
- Release date: September 8, 2013 (TIFF)
- Running time: 9 minutes
- Country: Canada
- Language: English

Out is a 2013 Canadian comedy-drama short film, directed by Jeremy LaLonde. The film stars David Tompa as Geoff, a young man whose family expects him to come out as gay when he announces that he has something to tell them, only for him to surprise them by actually coming out as a vampire.

The cast also includes David Huband as Geoff's father Mitch, Rosemary Doyle as his mother Cindy, Paula Brancati as his sister Karen, and Tommie-Amber Pirie as his vampire friend Kezia.

Prior to making the film, LaLonde talked to LGBTQ friends to ensure that he as a straight man was representing the process of coming out honestly and accurately.

The film premiered at the 2013 Toronto International Film Festival.

== Critical response ==
Jared Mobarak of The Film Stage wrote that "Lalonde keenly includes the stereotypical indifference of a sibling unfazed by contemporary times, the cautiously accepting Dad attempting to retain a level of machismo over his empathy, and an over-zealous Mom going above and beyond the call of duty. Underneath the humor of this outlandishly supernatural situation, though, lies the truth that caring families will never change as a result of such revelations. They’ll love you for who you are no matter what. The real question is whether or not you’re ready to admit who you as someone worthy of such love. This is the actual struggle Tompa and Pirie’s performances sell, culminating in an obvious yet necessary punchline that brings us all back to reality."

The film publication That Shelf wrote that "Lalonde gets some great performances from his actors and it has a genuinely funny moment where someone has to work their way out of a lie following a brilliantly dark calling of someone’s bluff, but the ending feels a bit obvious from the start and the film’s final sting leaves a bit of a sour taste on this one."

== Awards ==
The film was a nominee for Best Short Film at the 2014 Directors Guild of Canada awards.
