= The Lovebirds (2020 film) =

2020 film by Michael Showalter

- Release poster
- Directed by: Michael Showalter
- Screenplay by: Aaron Abrams; Brendan Gall
- Story by: Aaron Abrams; Brendan Gall; Martin Gero
- Produced by: Tom Lassally; Oly Obst; Martin Gero; Todd Schulman; Jordana Mollick; Issa Rae
- Starring: Kumail Nanjiani; Issa Rae; Paul Sparks; Anna Camp; Kyle Bornheimer
- Cinematography: Brian Burgoyne
- Edited by: Robert Nassau; Vince Filippone
- Music by: Michael Andrews
- Production companies: Paramount Pictures; MRC; 3 Arts Entertainment; Quinn's House
- Distributed by: Netflix
- Release date: May 22, 2020 (United States)
- Running time: 87 minutes
- Country: United States
- Language: English
- Budget: $16 million

The Lovebirds is a 2020 American romantic comedy film directed by Michael Showalter from a screenplay by Aaron Abrams and Brendan Gall, and a story by Abrams, Gall, and Martin Gero. The film stars Issa Rae and Kumail Nanjiani, as well as Paul Sparks, Anna Camp, and Kyle Bornheimer, and follows a couple who go on the run after witnessing a murder.

Originally scheduled to be a theatrical release by Paramount Pictures on April 3, 2020, the film was removed from the release schedule due to the COVID-19 pandemic closing theaters worldwide. Its rights were then sold to Netflix, which released the film digitally on May 22, 2020. The film received mixed reviews from critics, although Rae and Nanjiani's performances were praised.

== Plot ==
Jibran and Leilani are a couple who have been together for four years. Their relationship is fraught, and the two argue constantly about a variety of topics. While driving to a dinner party, the two mutually agree to end the relationship. Distracted by the breakup, Jibran runs a red light, hitting a cyclist with their car. The man refuses help and flees the scene. A man with a mustache suddenly commandeers their car, claiming to be a police officer and that the man on the bike is a criminal. He pursues the cyclist, but after catching him runs the cyclist over with their car several times, killing him. Mustache prepares to kill Jibran and Leilani with a gun but flees after hearing police sirens. Jibran and Leilani then flee the scene themselves.

Jibran wants them to turn themselves in, but Leilani argues that their unbelievable story and racial profiling will ensure they are blamed for the crime. Having taken the dead bicyclist's phone, they see he had planned a meeting at a bar with a woman named Edie. Leilani reasons that Edie will know who the man is, which will allow them to find out who the killer is and clear their names. The two meet Edie at the bar, only to find that it is a setup; the two are knocked out and tied up by Edie and her husband Brett. Edie mistakenly believes that Jibran and Leilani work for Bicycle, and alludes to blackmail being committed against Edie and Brett. As Edie prepares to torture Leilani, the pair manage to escape. The two travel to an address taken from Edie which they believe is Bicycle's home, only to find an apartment full of frat boys. They overpower and interrogate one of the boys, who admits he works for Bicycle as part of his blackmailing scheme. Before the two can learn more, Mustache arrives, killing all the boys in the apartment.

Jibran and Leilani escape with one of the blackmail envelopes, which contains photos of the intended recipients attending what appears to be a meeting of a secret society. They travel to the dinner party they were originally supposed to attend, tricking Leilani's co-worker Keith into unlocking Bicycle's phone, which contains an address to a black tie event. Leilani and Jibran travel to the event, where all the attendees are wearing masks identical to those shown in the blackmail photos. The meeting turns into an orgy, but is interrupted when the leader of the meeting discovers that there are impostors present. He tricks Jibran and Leilani into revealing themselves, but moments later an alarm sounds due to a police raid; Jibran and Leilani are taken into police custody.

The two meet with Detective Martin, who reveals that Bicycle's pursuit and murder were caught on traffic cameras, and the two were being sought as witnesses, not suspects. The police were aware of the secret gathering and planned to shut them down, but the group was somehow tipped off to the plan. Jibran and Leilani are being driven home, but their driver is revealed to be Mustache, who truly is a police officer, but is also paid by the society to shield them from law enforcement. Mustache also ran the blackmailing scheme with Bicycle, who was killed due to a dispute over payment. Mustache restrains Jibran and Leilani and prepares to kill them, but the three get into a struggle, and Leilani manages to shoot Mustache, who is then taken into custody. Jibran and Leilani make amends and kiss. One year later, Jibran and Leilani participate in The Amazing Race, which tests their relationship once again.

== Cast ==
- Kumail Nanjiani as Jibran
- Issa Rae as Leilani Brooks
- Anna Camp as Edie
- Paul Sparks as Mustache
- Kyle Bornheimer as Brett
- Andrene Ward-Hammond as Detective Martin
- Moses Storm as Steve
- Mahdi Cocci as Keith
- Narendra Singh Dhami as Nimesh
- Nicholas X. Parsons as Tom "Bicycle"
- Barry Rothbart as Mr. Hipster
- Catherine Cohen as Mrs. Hipster
- Phil Keoghan as himself (voice)

== Production ==
In January 2019, it was announced Kumail Nanjiani and Issa Rae were set to star in the film, with Michael Showalter directing from a screenplay by Aaron Abrams, Brendan Gall, and Martin Gero. Abrams, Gall, and Gero served as producers, alongside Oly Obst, Todd Schulman, and Jordana Mollick, while Showalter, Nanjiani, and Rae executive produced. Media Rights Capital produced and financed the film, while Paramount Pictures was set to distribute. Also in January, Anna Camp joined the cast of the film.

=== Filming ===
Principal photography began on January 27, 2019, in New Orleans. Production concluded on February 27, 2019.

== Release ==
The Lovebirds was originally scheduled to have its world premiere at South by Southwest on March 14, 2020, where Nanjiani, Rae and Michael Showalter were to appear. However, due to the COVID-19 pandemic, they cancelled their appearances and the festival was cancelled. It was also scheduled to be theatrically released by Paramount Pictures on April 3, 2020, as, but it was pulled from the schedule due to movie theater closures because of the pandemic restrictions.

In late-March, it was announced that the film had been bought by Netflix, who released it digitally on May 22, 2020. The film was the top-streamed item on the website its debut weekend, before falling to the fifth-most popular film in its second week. In November, Variety reported the film was the 10th-most watched straight-to-streaming title of 2020 up to that point.

== Reception ==
On the review aggregator website Rotten Tomatoes, the film holds an approval rating of 66% based on 174 reviews, with an average rating of 6/10. The website's critics consensus reads, "If the breezily enjoyable The Lovebirds feels like a little less than the sum of its parts, it's still an enjoyable showcase for the talents of its well-matched stars." At Metacritic, the film has a weighted average score of 59 out of 100, based on 34 critics, indicating "mixed or average" reviews.

Writing for Rolling Stone, Peter Travers gave the film 4 out of 5 stars, and wrote, "Issa Rae and Kumail Nanjiani generate big laughs and a sense of genuine connection as a New Orleans couple on the skids who find out what they really mean to each other when a bunch of psychos try to kill them."

David Ehrlich of IndieWire gave the film a "C−" grade, writing, "The truth is that The Lovebirds makes all too much sense on Netflix. Michael Showalter's follow-up to The Big Sick is as flat and algorithmic as his last rom-com was poignant and alive. The only thing the two films really have in common is a winning performance from Kumail Nanjiani." He also noted that "Rae refuses to quit on the movie even after there's no hope of redeeming it."
