= What Were They Thinking? =

Canadian documentary television series

- Genre: Documentary; Comedy
- Presented by: Sean Cullen
- Country of origin: Canada
- Original language: English

Production
- Running time: 30 minutes
- Production company: Soapbox

Original release
- Network: CTV; The Comedy Network
- Release: August 24, 2005

What Were They Thinking? is a Canadian documentary television series, which debuted in 2005 on The Comedy Network. Hosted by Sean Cullen, the series profiled the various quirky roadside attractions that towns and cities have erected in their quest to attract notice by building the "world's biggest" example of some random, often ridiculous, thing.

Cullen won a Gemini Award for best host in a lifestyle, practical information or performing arts program at the 21st Gemini Awards in 2006.
