= The Illegal Eater =

Canadian reality television series

- Genre: Reality
- Created by: Chris Charney; Scott R. Leary
- Written by: Chris Charney
- Directed by: Chris Charney; John Barnard; Scott R. Leary
- Starring: Steven Page
- Composers: Steven Page; Mitch Dorge
- Country of origin: Canada
- No. of seasons: 1
- No. of episodes: 13

Production
- Producer: Kyle Bornais Scott Leary Tony Wosk
- Production company: Farpoint Films

Original release
- Network: Travel + Escape; Esquire Network
- Release: October 22, 2013 – January 28, 2014

The Illegal Eater is a Canadian reality television series which premiered in 2013 in Canada on Travel + Escape. Hosted by musician Steven Page, the series featured Page traveling to various North American cities to profile "under the radar" food businesses, such as pop-up restaurants, food carts and underground restaurants. The show also aired in the United States on the Esquire Network.

The series also featured appearances by Paul Myers, Jason Priestley and Mike Doughty. Page collaborated with Mitch Dorge on the series music.

The series was nominated for a Rockie Award at the 2014 Banff World Media Festival, winning for Best Lifestyle Series. The show also garnered two Canadian Screen Award nominations at the 3rd Canadian Screen Awards in 2015, for Best Lifestyle Program or Series and Best Writing in a Lifestyle or Reality/Competition Program or Series.
