= Jeremy Larter =

Canadian actor, film director and screenwriter

Jeremy Larter is a Canadian actor, film director and screenwriter from Prince Edward Island. He is most noted for his 2018 film Pogey Beach, which won the Canadian Comedy Award for Best Feature Film at the 19th Canadian Comedy Awards in 2019. Larter also received nominations for Best Direction in a Feature Film and Best Writing in a Feature Film.

Larter had a number of roles as an actor, most notably in the failed 2012 film S.I.N. Theory, before creating and starring in the web series Just Passing Through in 2013. The series won the Canadian Comedy Award for Best Web Series at the 17th Canadian Comedy Awards in 2016.

Pogey Beach, his theatrical feature debut, expanded on the in-universe story of a fictional television show watched by the main characters in Just Passing Through.

His second feature film as a director, Who's Yer Father?, premiered at the 2023 Atlantic International Film Festival.
