= James vs. His Future Self =

- Theatrical release poster
- Directed by: Jeremy Lalonde
- Written by: Jeremy Lalonde; Jonas Chernick
- Produced by: Jonathan Bronfman; Jonas Chernick; Jordan Walker
- Starring: Jonas Chernick; Daniel Stern; Cleopatra Coleman
- Cinematography: Scott McClellan
- Edited by: Jeremy Lalonde
- Music by: Stephen Krecklo; Ian LeFeuvre
- Production companies: Banana-Moon Sky Films; JoBro Productions & Film Finance; Neophyte Productions
- Distributed by: Northern Banner Releasing; Gravitas Ventures
- Release date: September 17, 2019 (Cinéfest)
- Running time: 94 minutes
- Country: Canada
- Language: English

James vs. His Future Self is a 2019 Canadian science fiction comedy film, directed by Jeremy Lalonde. The film stars Jonas Chernick as James, a scientist researching time travel whose life is turned upside down when his older self (Daniel Stern) arrives from 17 years in the future to demand that he stop. The cast also includes Cleopatra Coleman, Frances Conroy, Tara Spencer-Nairn and Tommie-Amber Pirie.

The film was shot in Sudbury, Ontario, in 2018. It premiered at the Cinéfest Sudbury International Film Festival on September 17, 2019, and was selected as the opening gala film of the Edmonton International Film Festival the following week. It was released on demand in the United States by Gravitas Ventures on May 1, 2020. It received positive reviews from critics.

== Plot ==
James is a theoretical physicist who is obsessed with his research. His only friends are his sister Meridith and another scientist named Courtney. On his way to meet his sister he is captured by his Uber driver who claims to be his future self and warns him against pursuing his research. James is skeptical of his claims and only becomes more convinced by the potential success of his work, and learns that his research supervisor Dr. Rowley will soon have access to a particle accelerator that he needs to prove his theories. Future James ("Jimmy") tries to warn James that his obsession will ruin his life, and tries to convince James to live more in the moment and warns him of the things he will regret not doing, and even teaches him to meditate.

Meredith is trying to get James to deal with the death of their parents fifteen years ago and thinks it is time to finally spread their ashes. Courtney is planning to leave to work at the Large Hadron Collider at CERN in Switzerland. Encouraged by Jimmy, James tries to change, but is still determined to pursue his research. Jimmy explains that the time travel only allows him to go backwards in time and that he must then patiently live out the time in isolation to return to his present. Jimmy says that if James had really changed he wouldn't still be there. James admits to his feelings for Courtney and asks her out on a date, but when she gives him inspiration for his research he is distracted and ruins the moment. He is unable to reconcile with Courtney and she gets ready to leave for Switzerland.

James becomes more determined to pursue his research and Dr. Rowley is about to announce her commitment to their new research project. Increasingly desperate, Jimmy shoots her through the hand with a crossbow and hunts her through the lab. Instead of attending the big announcement James has gone to the lake to meditate. James finally realizes he needs to change, which causes Jimmy to fade to dust just before killing Dr. Rowley.

James sits in a café with a puppy on his lap. Courtney joins him and eats a croissant and says "I can't believe you're here." The other patrons in the café are revealed to all be different versions of James, Courtney, and the dog, from different stages in time.

== Cast ==
- Jonas Chernick as James
- Daniel Stern as Jimmy
- Cleopatra Coleman as Courtney
- Frances Conroy as Dr. Edna Rowley
- Tommie-Amber Pirie as Meredith

== Reception ==
On Rotten Tomatoes the film has an approval rating of 100% based on reviews from 17 critics.

The film received four Canadian Screen Award nominations at the 8th Canadian Screen Awards in 2020, for Best Supporting Actor (Stern), Best Original Screenplay (Chernick, Lalonde), Best Original Score (Ian LeFeuvre and Stephen Krecklo) and Best Original Song (LeFeuvre for "Travel Through").
