= The Medicine Line =

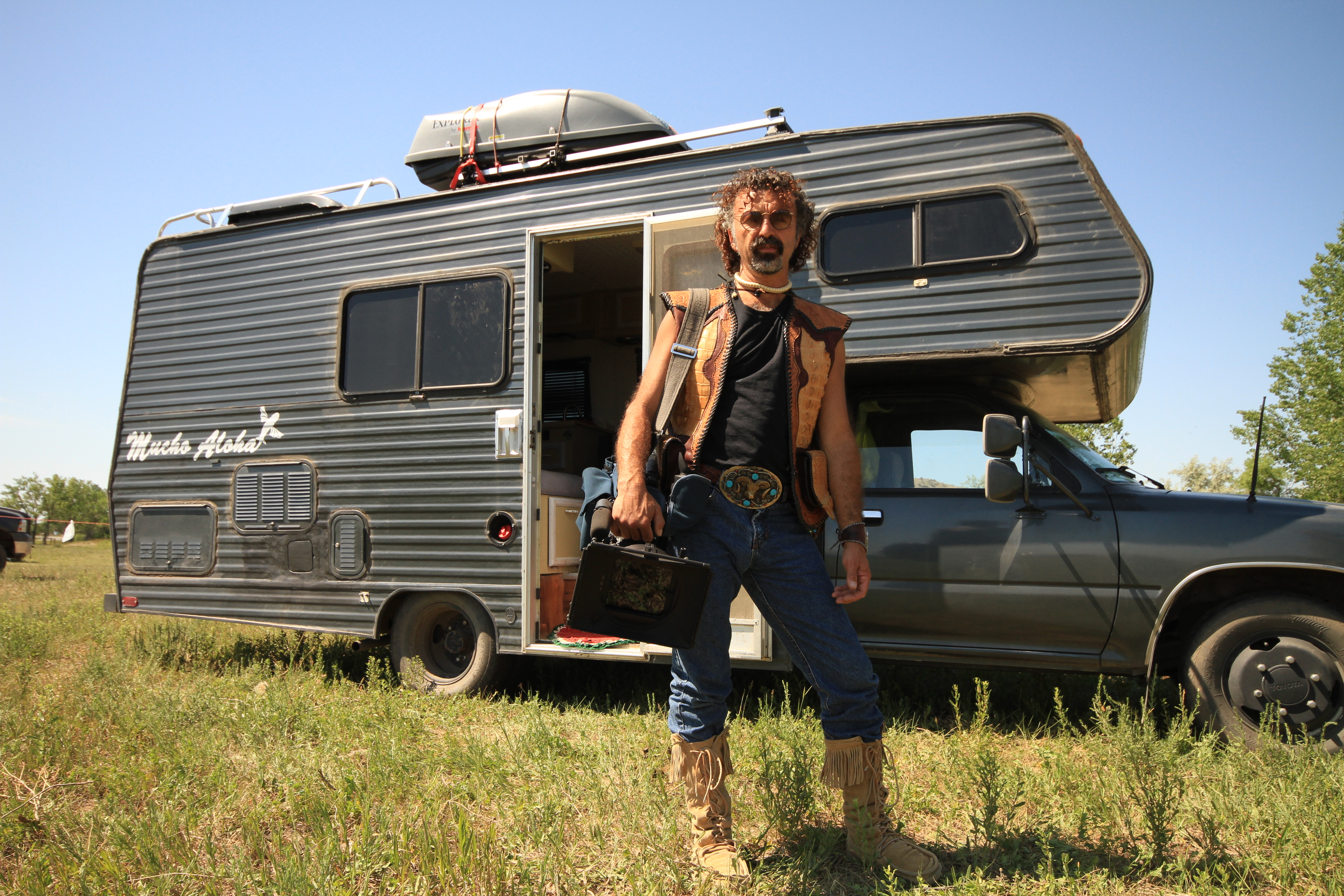
- Dave and his RV
- Genre: documentary
- Written by: Chris Charney, Cam Bennett
- Directed by: John Barnard, Chris Charney, Scott R. Leary, Cam Bennett, Reil Munroe, Shereen Jerrett
- Starring: Dave Gaudet
- Composer: Mitch Dorge
- Country of origin: Canada
- No. of seasons: 1
- No. of episodes: 13

Production
- Executive producers: John Barnard, Chris Charney
- Producers: Kyle Bornais, Scott R. Leary, Dave Gaudet
- Production location: North America
- Production company: Farpoint Films

Original release
- Network: APTN
- Release: January 22, 2014

The Medicine Line is a Canadian documentary television series that was created and produced by Farpoint Films and premiered in Canada in 2014 on APTN. The show starred Dave Gaudet.

The show won a Golden Sheaf Award for Best Documentary Series at the 2014 Yorkton Film Festival.

== Episodes ==
Here is a list of the episodes of the documentary TV series.

No.	Title	Directed by	Written by	Original release date
1	"Icons of Oppression"	John Barnard	Chris Charney	January 22, 2014
2	"Re-animators"	John Barnard, Reil Munroe	Chris Charney	January 29, 2014
3	"Peyote"	Shereen Jerrett	Chris Charney	February 5, 2014
4	"A Rolling Stone"	Scott R. Leary	Chris Charney	February 12, 2014
5	"Space"	Chris Charney	Chris Charney	February 19, 2014
6	"The Haunt"	Scott R. Leary, Riel Munroe	Chris Charney	February 26, 2014
7	"The Hunt"	Chris Charney, Riel Munroe	Chris Charney	March 5, 2014
8	"Silent Heroes"	Cam Bennett	Chris Charney, Cam Bennett	March 12, 2014
9	"Dance"	Chris Charney	Chris Charney	March 19, 2014
10	"Images Of The Ages"	John Barnard	Chris Charney	March 26, 2014
11	"Resistance"	Chris Charney	Chris Charney	April 2, 2014
12	"Legacy In Stones"	John Barnard, Riel Munroe	Chris Charney	April 9, 2014
13	"Dave's Roots"	John Barnard	Chris Charney	April 16, 2014
