= Room for Rent (2017 film) =

2017 Canadian comedy/mystery film

- Directed by: Matt Atkinson
- Written by: Matt Atkinson
- Produced by: Justin Rebelo, Kyle Bornais
- Starring: Brett Gelman; Mark Little; Carla Gallo; Stephnie Weir; Patrick J. Adams; Mark McKinney
- Cinematography: Robert Scarborough
- Edited by: Michael Pierro
- Music by: Richard Pell, Ian LeFeuvre
- Production companies: El Duo Motions Pictures; Farpoint Films; Musterios Entertainment Inc.; Prodigy Pictures Inc; Vigilante Productions
- Distributed by: Gunpowder & Sky
- Release dates: September 16, 2017 (Atlantic Film Festival); November 2, 2018 (United States)
- Running time: 89 minutes
- Country: Canada
- Language: English

Room for Rent is a Canadian comedy/mystery film written and directed by Matt Atkinson. It stars Brett Gelman, Mark Little, Carla Gallo, Stephnie Weir, Patrick J. Adams, and Mark McKinney.

It had its world premiere at the Atlantic Film Festival on September 16, 2017, won awards for its 2017 showings at the LA Comedy Festival and Chicago Comedy Festival and its 2018 showing at the Canadian Film Festival, and won three Canadian Comedy Awards when it opened theatrically in Canada on October 26, 2018. It was released to video on demand on November 2, 2018.

== Plot ==
In high school, Mitch Baldwin won the lottery and blew all the cash. Twelve years later, he's holed up living with his parents when his dad says they have to downsize their house so he can retire. Mitch insists they rent a room to save from selling their home. Enter Carl Lemay. Carl at first seems like the perfect renter but when he begins upsetting Mitch's routine way of life, a battle of wits turns into all out war.

== Cast ==
- Brett Gelman as Carl Lemay
- Mark Little as Mitch Baldwin
- Carla Gallo as Lindsay Ross
- Stephnie Weir as Betty Baldwin
- Patrick J. Adams as Huey Dorsey
- Mark McKinney as Warren Baldwin

== Production ==
Principal photography took place in Winnipeg, Canada in June 2016.

== Release ==
The film had its world premiere at the Atlantic Film Festival on September 16, 2017. This was followed by its US Premiere at the San Diego International Film Festival on October 16, 2017, and its Asian premiere at the Shanghai International Film Festival on June 19, 2018.

The film opened theatrically in Canada on October 26, 2018.

Gunpowder & Sky released the film in the US to video on demand platforms on November 2, 2018.

== Reception ==
The film has an 88% rating on Rotten Tomatoes. Alan Ng of Film Threat awarded the film three and a half stars out of five. Norm Wilner of NOW Toronto awarded the film three stars out of five.

== Awards and recognition ==
Year	Awards	Category	Nominee	Result	Ref
2017	LA Comedy Festival	Best Film		Won	
2017	LA Comedy Festival	Best Screenplay	Matthew Atkinson	Won	
2017	LA Comedy Festival	Best Actor	Brett Gelman	Won	
2017	Chicago Comedy Festival	Best Feature		Won	
2017	Chicago Comedy Festival	Best Actress	Stephnie Weir	Won	
2018	Canadian Film Festival	Best Feature		Won	
2018	Canadian Film Festival	Best Set Design	Gord Wilding	Won	
2018	Canadian Comedy Awards	Best Direction	Matthew Atkinson	Won	
2018	Canadian Comedy Awards	Best Writing	Matthew Atkinson	Won	
2018	Canadian Comedy Awards	Best Performance	Mark Little	Won	
