= Roxy (film) =

#Roxy
- Theatrical release poster
- Directed by: Michael Kennedy
- Written by: Tony Binns
- Based on: Cyrano de Bergerac by Edmond Rostand
- Produced by: Camille Beaudoin; Eric Rebalkin
- Starring: Jake Short; Sarah Fisher; Booboo Stewart; Pippa Mackie; Jake Smith; Carter Thicke; Danny Trejo
- Cinematography: John Spooner
- Edited by: Carey Komadina
- Music by: Mike Shields
- Production company: Mosaic Entertainment
- Distributed by: Upstream Flix; Spesch
- Release date: October 29, 2018 (Canada)
- Running time: 105 minutes
- Country: Canada
- Language: English

#Roxy is a 2018 Canadian teen romantic comedy film directed by Michael Kennedy and starring Jake Short, Sarah Fisher, Booboo Stewart, Pippa Mackie, Jake Smith, Carter Thicke, and Danny Trejo. Like the 1987 film Roxanne, #Roxy is also a modern retelling of Edmond Rostand's 1897 play Cyrano de Bergerac. The film premiered exclusively in Landmark Cinemas at Edmonton City Centre in Edmonton, Canada, on October 29, 2018, and was released on digital platforms and through local cable providers on November 6, 2018, by Upstream Flix in association with Spesch.

== Plot ==
Cyrus is a computer geek who has an abnormally large nose. During an ongoing pep rally at the high school, Christian, a new student, spots Roxanne and asks about her, while Cyrus hacks into the school system and disgraces a football jock sending a nude picture to Roxanne. Cyrus is later caught and is given detention in the computer lab. Cyrus' cousin Bronwyn encourages him to confess his feelings to Roxy, his longtime crush, but he fears rejection from her due to his nose. Bronwyn advises him not to worry about his nose since no one else cares. However, even if he tries to hide behind his bold exterior, Cyrus is insecure about his nose and cares a great deal what other people think.

Roxy calls almost immediately and thanks Cyrus for what he did, then asks that they meet up the next day. She says she wants to tell him something very important. An ecstatic Cyrus thinks she might like him back. He goes to see her the next day. While writing a letter to her (on Bronwyn's insistence), which he hides immediately upon Roxy's arrival. Roxy tells him she likes someone. Cyrus is hopeful that it may be him, only to be disappointed when Roxy reveals it is Christian, and she is sure he likes her back. Albeit heartbroken, Cyrus agrees to help Roxy.

Cyrus throws the letter he wrote for Roxy into the trash bin. Unbeknownst to him, Bronwyn picks up the letter and slips it into Roxy's locker. At the lunch spot, Cyrus is insulted by Christian, who does this to stop a bully from harassing Cyrus. Cyrus tries to get back at Christian but stops when he is told his name by Lynn. He proceeds to talk to Christian about Roxy. Christian is unsure of how to begin to talk to Roxy, so Cyrus helps.

== Cast ==
- Jake Short as Cyrus Nollen
- Sarah Fisher as Roxy
- Booboo Stewart as Christian
- Danny Trejo as Principal Castillo
- Pippa Mackie as Bronwyn
- Jake Smith as Lee
- Patricia Zentilli as Gail Nollen
- Carter Thicke as Steve
- Hannah Duke as Deana
- Scott Pocha as Mike Flurry
- Jesse Lipscombe as Coach Harris
- Chris Aanderson as Mr. Rostand

== Production ==
Principal photography took place in Edmonton and St. Albert, Alberta, in July 2016.

== Reception ==
Scott Hayes of StAlbertToday.ca rated #Roxy four stars and wrote, "Overall, it's an impressive production, with Michael Kennedy's proficient directing, Tony Binns' fun and winning script, and the cast of younger players who all held up their ends with totally professional portrayals of their characters."

Movie Nation critic Roger Moore gave the film two-and-a-half out of four, dubbing it a "flip and funny rom-com" and praising Binns's screenplay, while concluding, "#Roxy hews a little too closely to the original Cyrano when it reaches a moment of violence and goes on and on beyond that in attempt to find a payoff. It's an 85 minute movie wriggling out of a 100 minute sack in its final act."

Renee Schonfeld of Common Sense Media awarded the film three stars out of five.
