= Jeremy Lalonde =

Canadian filmmaker

Jeremy LaLonde
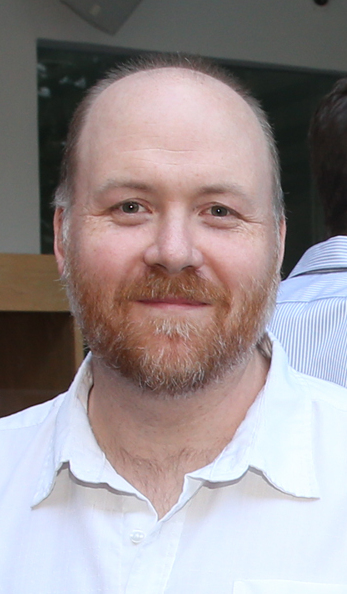
- LaLonde in 2017
- Born: Jeremy LaLonde; January 7, 1981 (age 45); Cayuga, Ontario, Canada
- Occupation: Filmmaker
- Years active: 2000–present
- Website: JeremyLaLonde.com

Jeremy LaLonde (born January 7, 1981) is a Canadian filmmaker. He is known for his work in Canadian film and television.

== Early life ==
LaLonde grew up in Cayuga, Ontario. After graduating from Niagara College, LaLonde moved to Toronto to begin his career as a filmmaker. To support himself, he worked as an editor in commercials as well as such television series as Wipeout Canada, Princess, Meet The Family, You Gotta Eat Here, Tessa & Scott, and most recently Baroness Von Sketch Show.

== Career ==
His short film Out, which premiered at the 2013 Toronto International Film Festival, went on to screen at over two dozen film festivals including Outfest and Whistler Film Festival. In 2014, it was nominated for Best Short Film at the Directors Guild of Canada. His 2014 short film Bastards opened the Canadian Film Festival and was selected by the National Screen Institution for their Totally Television Program.

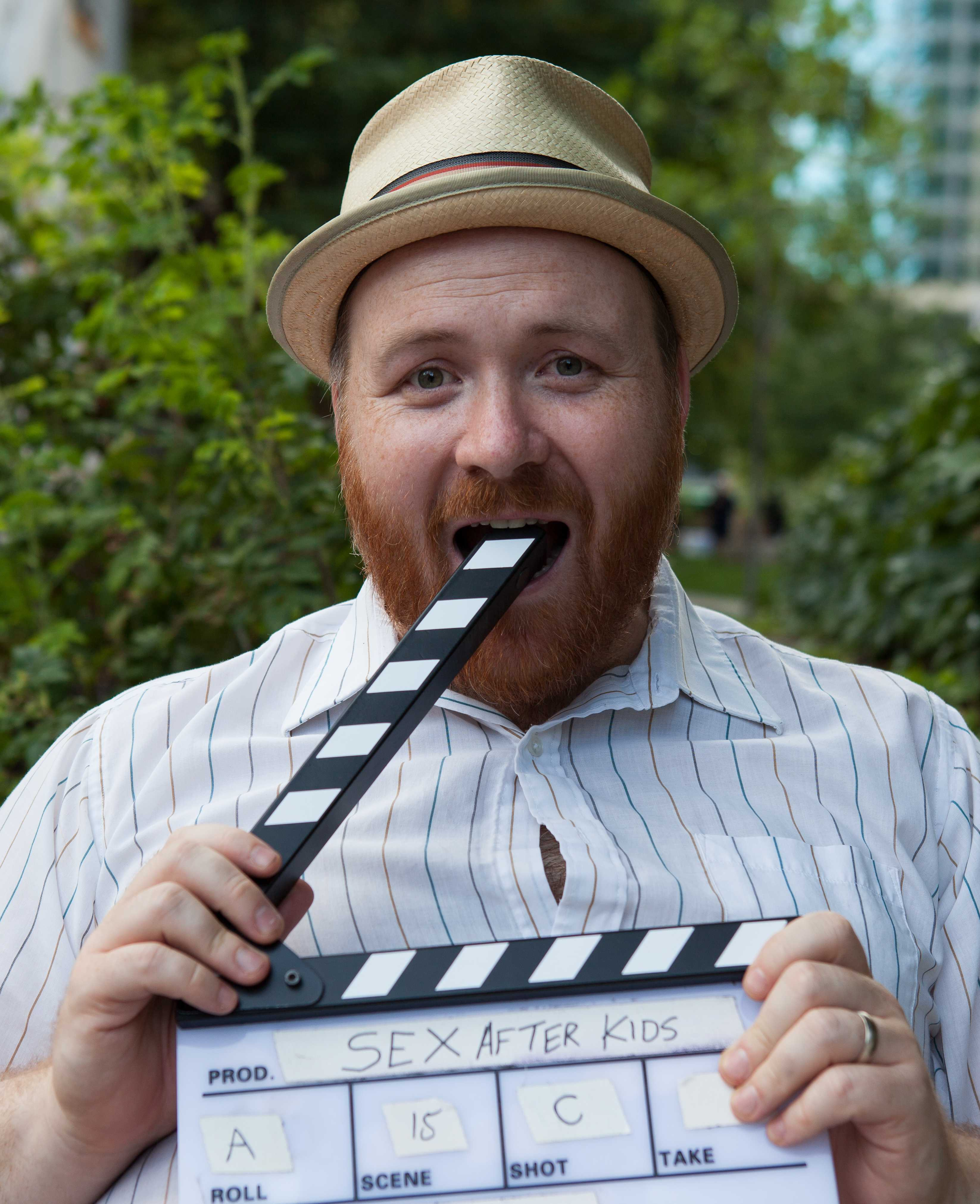
LaLonde on the set of Sex After Kids in 2012

His first feature film as a writer/director, the 2010 comedy The Untitled Work of Paul Shepard, premiered at Cinefest Sudbury and was nominated for Best Director at the 2011 Canadian Comedy Awards.

In 2013, he released his second feature film Sex After Kids which premiered at the Santa Barbara Film Festival where it was the runner-up for the Audience Award. It screened at several festivals worldwide and won the Wedgie Award for Comedy at the Edmonton Film Festival. It was named Best Feature Film at Huntsville Film North and was nominated for seven Canadian Comedy Awards and won Best Screenplay and Best Director.

His third feature film How to Plan an Orgy in a Small Town starring Jewel Staite, was financed partly through Indiegogo and was named The Crowd Life's Crowdfunding Campaign of the Year. It premiered at the Atlantic Film Festival in Canada and the Slamdance Film Festival in the United States. It screened at over a dozen festivals internationally and won the Jury Award for Best Dramatic Feature at the Edmonton Film Festival and took home top prizes at the Canadian Film Fest in 2016.

In 2015, LaLonde was named Best Local Filmmaker in Toronto by NOW Magazine.

His fourth feature film, The Go-Getters, premiered at the 2018 Cinequest Film Festival where it won the award for Best Narrative Feature: Comedy. It was released theatrically in Canada and on demand in the United States in December 2018.

He worked as an editor on the first two seasons of Baroness von Sketch Show and transitioned into the role of director for its upcoming third season, which aired on CBC in Canada and IFC in the United States in fall 2018.

His fifth feature film, James vs. His Future Self, starred Jonas Chernick, Daniel Stern, Cleopatra Coleman, Tommie-Amber Pirie and Frances Conroy. It premiered at Cinefest Sudbury and was the opening night gala for the Edmonton International Film Festival, before being released theatrically in 2020.

His sixth feature film, Ashgrove, premiered at the 2022 Glasgow Film Festival. The film Daniel's Gotta Die premiered at the 2022 Austin Film Festival.

In 2026 he began to create a web series, called Rowan Hall: Hogwarts 2026. These movies are set in the Harry Potter universe and were created using AI.

== Awards and nominations ==
Year	Nominated work	Association	Category	Result
2011	The Untitled Work of Paul Shepard	Canadian Comedy Awards	Best Director	Nominated
2013	Sex After Kids	Canadian Comedy Awards	Best Screenplay	Won
2013	Sex After Kids	Canadian Comedy Awards	Best Director	Won
2013	Sex After Kids	Film North	Best Feature Film	Won
2013	Sex After Kids	Edmonton Film Festival	Wedgie Award for Comedy	Won
2014	Out	Directors Guild of Canada	Best Short Film	Nominated
2015	How to Plan an Orgy in a Small Town	Edmonton Film Festival	Jury Award for Best Canadian Feature	Won
2016	How to Plan an Orgy in a Small Town	Canadian Comedy Awards	Best Feature Film	Nominated
2016	How to Plan an Orgy in a Small Town	Canadian Film Fest	Best Feature Film	Won
2016	How to Plan an Orgy in a Small Town	Canadian Film Fest	Best Ensemble	Won
2016	How to Plan an Orgy in a Small Town	Canadian Film Fest	Best Costume Design	Won
2017	Baroness Von Sketch Show	Canadian Screen Awards	Best Editing (Variety or Sketch Show)	Won
2018	Baroness Von Sketch Show	Canadian Screen Awards	Best Editing (Comedy Series)	Won
2018	The Go-Getters	Cinequest Film Festival	Best Narrative Feature: Comedy	Won
2019	Baroness Von Sketch Show	Canadian Screen Awards	Best Editing (Comedy Series)	Won
2019	Baroness Von Sketch Show	Canadian Screen Awards	Best Direction (Variety or Sketch Comedy)	Won
2019	Baroness Von Sketch Show	Canadian Comedy Awards	Best Direction (Comedy Series)	Won
2019	Baroness Von Sketch Show	Directors Guild of Canada	Best Direction (Comedy Series)	Won
2019	The Go-Getters	Canadian Comedy Awards	Best Direction (Feature Film)	Nominated
