= The L.A. Complex =

Canadian drama television series

- Genre: Drama
- Created by: Martin Gero
- Directed by: Martin Gero; Stefan Brogren
- Starring: Jonathan Patrick Moore; Joe Dinicol; Andra Fuller; Chelan Simmons; Cassie Steele; Benjamin Charles Watson; Jewel Staite; Dayle McLeod; Michael Levinson; Georgina Reilly
- Composer: Tim Welch
- Country of origin: Canada
- Original language: English
- No. of seasons: 2
- No. of episodes: 19

Production
- Executive producers: Martin Gero; Linda Schuyler; Stephen Stohn
- Producers: Stephanie Williams; David Lowe
- Production locations: Los Angeles, California; Toronto, Ontario
- Running time: 41–44 minutes
- Production company: Epitome Pictures

Original release
- Network: CTV; MuchMusic
- Release: January 10 – September 24, 2012

The L.A. Complex (originally Highland Gardens) is a Canadian drama television series that premiered on CTV on January 10, 2012, subsequently airing on MuchMusic. It also began airing in the United States on April 24, 2012, on The CW. The series stars Cassie Steele as Abby Vargas, an aspiring actress who moves to Los Angeles with nothing but her Maple Leafs hockey bag and dreams of being a famous actress. As described in CTV publicity materials, "The L.A. Complex follows the lives of twenty year olds living in the same apartment complex in L.A. trying to make it as actors, dancers, producers and comedians. Relationships begin and end, the need to succeed is tested and all characters are pushed to their breaking points."

On December 3, 2012, it was announced that The L.A. Complex was not renewed for a third season by Much and Bell Media, but with a possibility that the series could be picked up by another network. On December 20, 2012, The CW announced that the series would not be picked up, making it officially canceled.

== Cast and characters ==
=== Main ===
- Jonathan Patrick Moore as Connor Lake, a good-looking and successful actor from Australia who suffers from depression and self-harming
- Joe Dinicol as Nick Wagner, a geeky, socially awkward stand-up comedian originally from Calgary
- Andra Fuller as Kaldrick King, (Note: Fuller is added to the main cast from episode two.) real name Sean Dougan, a successful but troubled rapper originally from Oakland, California, who is secretly gay
- Chelan Simmons as Alicia Lowe, (Note: In season two, Simmons and Watson are credited with the main cast only when they appear. Simmons appears in two episodes, Watson in three episodes.) an aspiring dancer from Regina who will "do whatever it takes" to make ends meet
- Cassie Steele as Abby Vargas, an accident-prone aspiring actress from Toronto and illegal immigrant
- Benjamin Charles Watson as Tariq Muhammad, an aspiring hip-hop music producer originally from Montreal who works as an intern for Kaldrick King, and eventually becomes his lover
- Jewel Staite as Raquel Westbrook, a 30-year-old cynical, once successful actress from Halifax who fears her career is now over
- Dayle McLeod as Beth Pirelli (season 2), a headstrong teenager from Winnipeg who moves into The Lux with her younger brother Simon, after their father abandons them
- Michael Levinson as Simon Pirelli (season 2), a child actor who moves into The Lux with his older sister Beth
- Georgina Reilly as Sabrina Reynolds (season 2; guest star season 1), a ruthless, LA-born comedian, who shares a rivalry with Nick

=== Recurring ===
- Ennis Esmer as Eddie Demir, the landlord and manager of The Lux Motel
- Paul F. Tompkins as himself, a straight-talking comedian
- Dayo Ade as DyNasty, Kaldrick King's primary music producer, who helps cover up his homosexual affairs
- Kristopher Turner and Jordan Johnson-Hinds as Cam Logan and Kevin Rainer, aspiring filmmakers who reside at the Lux and begin a collaboration with Raquel
- Aaron Abrams as Ricky Lloyd, a once successful child actor and recovering drug addict, who makes a sex tape with Alicia to try and revitalise his career
- Ryan Belleville as Scott Cray (season 2), Nick and Sabrina's lecherous, drug-addicted boss
- Brett Dier and Megan Hutchings as Brandon Kelly and Laura Knight (season 2), actors on the Christian show Saving Grace, who engage in a three-way relationship with Abby
- William Stewart as Rook (season 2), Kal's loyal friend, who shoots and kills his rival, Infinite Jest, in the series finale
- Krista Allen as Jennifer Bell (season 2), a successful actress who starts a "show-mance" with Connor to remain relevant in the acting business
- Eugene Clark as Walter Dougan (season 2), Kal's estranged father who runs a halfway house in Downtown Los Angeles for paroled ex-convicts and homeless teenage runaways
- Stephan James as Infinite Jest (season 2), Kaldrick's rapper rival
- Jarod Joseph as Christopher Taylor (season 2), Kaldrick King's openly gay lawyer boyfriend
- Louis Ferreira as Dean Pirelli (season 2), Beth and Simon's estranged father
- Steve Byers as Gray Sanders (season 2), Abby's serviceman boyfriend
- Tori Anderson as Charlotte Lake (season 2), Connor's estranged sister
- Matt Murray as Manny (season 2), Raquel's co-worker at the restaurant, who runs a credit card scam

Cast notes

== Episodes ==
=== Season 1 (2012) ===
No. overall	No. in season	Title	Directed by	Written by	Canadian air date	U.S. air date	Canadian viewers	U.S. viewers
1	1	"Down in LA"	Martin Gero	Martin Gero	April 24, 2012	January 10, 2012	60,000	0.63
New to Los Angeles, Abby Vargas is evicted from her apartment after falling behind with her rent. Broke and desperate, Abby finds a place to crash at The Deluxe Motel ("The Lux") in Hollywood. There, she meets a group of like-minded, displaced dreamers from small towns in Canada also trying to succeed in the United States. Abby's friend Nick is a struggling comedian working in a coffee shop looking for his first big break, despite his lack of talent. Another friend, Tariq, works as an intern and personal assistant to major rap producer DyNasty, and tries to get noticed with his own hip-hop beats at the recording studio where he works full-time. Connor is an up-and-coming actor from Australia who has landed a role as a doctor on a primetime television soap opera; he hooks up with Abby during a wild party at The Lux. Alicia is a struggling dancer who moonlights as a stripper in a local gentlemen's club. Raquel is Connor's ex-girlfriend and a struggling character actress looking for another job after her latest TV show is canceled. After a series of missed opportunities, mishaps, and a broken-down vehicle, Abby starts to wonder if she should return to her hometown in Toronto and give up her dreams of being an actress, or if tomorrow will be her day. The simulcast of the series première on CTV had 351,000 viewers.
2	2	"Do Something"	Martin Gero	Aaron Abrams	May 1, 2012	January 17, 2012	87,000	0.58
Alicia offers Abby the chance to make large sums of money as a dancer at the gentlemen's club as long as she is willing to "play the part", but Abby gets fired after only a few days. Raquel decides she is no longer going to wait for her agent to call for a job, and starts pushing a duo of struggling filmmakers to get their film made for her to play the lead. Meanwhile, Alicia is not having any luck with her dancing auditions and takes a different approach by attending a party with a D-list actor named Ricky Lloyd that she meets at the gentlemen's club. After presenting an impressive demo at DyNasty's recording studio, Tariq is offered the chance to produce a track with Kaldrick King. When he meets the infamous gangster rapper, Tariq quickly realizes that this new gig will not be easy. Elsewhere, Connor settles into his new house in the Hollywood Hills, but misses the loud and drama-filled life of The Lux, and he still keeps in touch with Abby despite being aware that she has a boyfriend back in Toronto.
3	3	"Who You Know"	Stefan Brogren	Matt Huether & Cole Bastedo	May 8, 2012	January 24, 2012	40,000	0.54
Abby discovers that the acting part she landed is not what she expected when she does not receive any lines, movement or even get her face featured. After another bad performance at the Comedy Club, Nick meets and has a one-night stand with a mysterious woman, which he later uses as comedy inspiration for his next appearance. Meanwhile, Raquel gets fired from her talent agency when trying to get her script sold, as well as making a new friend, named Gary, at Alcoholics Anonymous. Kaldrick shows hostility towards Tariq after a night of sex to hide his respectful feelings for him from both his and DyNasty's entourage at the recording studio. Alicia is offered to make a sex tape by Ricky. A lonely Connor shows signs of self-harm.
4	4	"The Other Side of the Door"	Stefan Brogren	Karen Hill	May 15, 2012	January 31, 2012	44,000	0.53
Alicia's dance career is ruined when no one wants to work with her due to her released sex tape. Meanwhile, Connor flashes back to his troubled and abused childhood in Australia, while in the present he seeks the advice of an acting coach to help motivate him. Abby and Nick bond which leads to him showing her the wonders of Los Angeles. Raquel continues to try to search for funding for her friends' script, and goes out on her birthday with Gary, and later spends time with Connor. Elsewhere, Kaldrick and Tariq take a break from L.A. to develop a new layer to their relationship when Tariq takes Kaldrick on a road trip to a cabin up the coast, where they interact with an understanding middle-aged couple whom are aware of their relationship. However, once back in public, Kal becomes more desperate to keep his tough-guy reputation intact in order to hide his romantic tryst with Tariq.
5	5	"Home"	Martin Gero	Brendan Gall	May 22, 2012	February 7, 2012	16,000	0.45
Raquel is ecstatic after finally securing financing for her film project, but soon finds herself questioning her methods of making it happen. Connor hits rock bottom as he continues to have painful and repressed childhood memories of abuse by his alcoholic father following his mother's abandonment of him. Meanwhile, Kaldrick physically threatens Abby at the recording studio to keep his relationship with Tariq a secret out of fear for his own life should his homosexuality ever be made public. Nick's love life heats up as he and Abby go on their first official date, while at the same time he begins attending an acting workshop where he meets an ambitious, aspiring stand-up actress named Sabrina, who gives him some acting tips, and then seduces him. Elsewhere, Alicia finds hope for her career in the pornography business, but her hopes may be short-lived.
6	6	"Burn It Down"	Martin Gero	Story by : Martin Gero; Teleplay by : Martin Gero, Aaron Abrams & Brendan Gall	May 29, 2012	February 14, 2012	22,000	0.62
Abby and Nick try to take their relationship to the next level as they continue to revamp their respective acting and stage careers at the studio lot, but Nick's jealous one-night stand, Sabrina, tries to win him back. Meanwhile, Connor searches for answers about his past as he recovers in the hospital following a drunken bar brawl that has led to his face being scarred but improving the ratings for his TV show. Raquel questions her decisions over rejecting Connor in favor for her own career with Gary. Alicia decides to accept the "casting couch" routine to advance her career, but she eventually comes to a decision on whether to accept re-joining a dance troupe, or accept a more lucrative offer at the porn studio. Elsewhere, Tariq and Kaldrick's rocky relationship comes to a shocking end when DyNasty walks in on them during a makeout session in the studio and Kaldrick resorts to violence to keep his homosexuality a secret at any cost, leaving Tariq inches from death.

=== Season 2 (2012) ===
Production on the second and final season began in mid-April, and the season premiered in Canada on July 17, 2012. The 13-episode second and final season was simulcast by The CW. Alan Thicke joined the cast as Donald Gallagher, a hot-headed actor-director-producer. Also guest-starring is Louis Ferreira as Beth and Simon's father Dean Pirelli.

No. overall	No. in season	Title	Directed by	Written by	Canadian air date	U.S. air date	Canadian viewers	U.S. viewers
7	1	"Vacancy"	Martin Gero	Martin Gero	July 17, 2012	July 17, 2012	88,000	0.66
Alicia decides to take the dance troupe offer and moves out of The Lux. After severely beating Tariq, Kaldrick sets out to make things right, only to find that Tariq has gone into hiding. When a private investigator tracks down and brings Tariq to the studio, DyNasty and Kaldrick's lawyers offer Tariq $100,000 for medical expenses in exchange for Tariq not pressing charges against Kaldrick (who already has several prior arrests for similar homophobic incidents), as well as sign a clause in publicly and privately keeping silent about Kaldrick's true sexual orientation. Tariq agrees to sign the clause and stay silent, but refuses to take any of Kaldrick's money and immediately leaves Los Angeles for good. In the aftermath of burning down his own house, Connor is eager to drown his sorrows and turns to Raquel for comfort to hide his pain. However, Raquel has her own issues as she discovers that she is pregnant, but keeps it to herself. Back at The Lux, Nick and Abby take their relationship to the next level, but learns that living together has its perks. After her film deal falls through, Abby goes to an audition for a role on a Christian TV series called Saying Grace while Nick has a run-in with the jealous Sabrina during a meeting to land a comedy series writing offer that she also wants. Elsewhere, in Winnipeg, Beth is a teenage runaway living in her station wagon with her 10-year-old brother, Simon, whom she sets to turn into a film star after his appearance in a TV commercial and decides to pursue the commercial's director back to L.A.
8	2	"The Contract"	Martin Gero	Martin Gero	July 24, 2012	July 24, 2012	N/A	0.39
Despite Abby's best efforts to masquerade as a good Christian girl, her first day filming on Saying Grace is ruined as she sees the seedy underside of the motion picture business, and of her co-stars Brandon and Laura, which may threaten both her career and life. This is nothing compared to Nick's woes, as he is pitted against his former fling, the scorned and vindictive Sabrina, now that they are working together, and who sets out to destroy Nick's career. Meanwhile, Connor receives an interesting offer from A-list actress Jennifer Bell, and Raquel continues to hide her pregnancy from everyone so she can continue to work, but finds offers difficult to come by. Elsewhere, Beth and Simon arrive in Los Angeles, where they struggle to make their own way while trying to break into the film industry, which eventually leads to them moving into Alicia's vacant room at The Lux. Elsewhere, Kaldrick lands in the hospital after a suicide attempt and voluntarily commits himself to the psych ward, but he is still reluctant of opening up about his shame at being gay—apparently out of fear for his career, his tough reputation, and possibly his own life.
9	3	"Choose Your Battles"	Martin Gero	Karen Hill	July 31, 2012	July 31, 2012	N/A	0.44
Kaldrick is barely holding it together following his hospital stay, but forcibly pushes himself back into work by recording a new track for his album which is based on his failed relationship with the departed Tariq. DyNasty throws a press conference for Kaldrick as part of his comeback. DyNasty also confides in Kaldrick that he knows about his homosexuality, but Kaldrick continues to maintain that he is not gay and threatens DyNasty with physical violence should he ever tell anyone. During a radio interview, Kaldrick hears a familiar voice during the call-in. Later at a party at Kaldrick's house, a rival rapper, Infinite Jest, crashes the party and gets beaten up and thrown out by Kaldrick and his friend Rook after he makes a homophobic joke. Meanwhile, Connor finally uses his influence and gets Raquel a role on his TV show, even as Raquel starts to feel jealous over Connor's bogus relationship with Jennifer Bell, even after he tells Raquel that he is with Jennifer only for publicity reasons. Nick and Abby's rocky relationship is put to the test as Sabrina attempts to drive them apart by seducing him, while at the same time, she also tries to take over his job for herself. Elsewhere, Beth breaks a few rules and laws to get Simon more auditions as part of her ploy to turn him into a high-paying film star.
10	4	"Be a Man"	Stefan Brogren	Brendan Gall	August 7, 2012	August 7, 2012	N/A	0.44
Connor is forced to make a tough choice to continue his sham relationship with Jennifer Bell while avoiding a suspicious insurance investigator looking into the fire at his former house. Meanwhile, Kaldrick pays a visit to his estranged father, Walter Duggan, who lives and works in a homeless shelter to come to terms with his troubled past. After suffering a miscarriage, Raquel suffers another blow to her massive ego on a film set as her latest role is downsized. Needing a place to stay after her breakup with Nick, Abby looks to befriend her Saying Grace co-star Brandon, where he offers the troubled and insecure Abby to move in with him and his co-star girlfriend Laura at their spacious apartment. Meanwhile, Nick grows tired of enduring Sabrina's cruel pranks at and away from work and tries a ploy to beat her at her own game, but Sabrina always seems to have a defense to every attack Nick throws at her. On a day full of major auditions for Simon, Beth's big mouth gets her into trouble when she faces off against a crafty single mother whom is also dead set to turning her own son into a star.
11	5	"Taking the Day"	Stefan Brogren	Carl Binder	August 14, 2012	August 14, 2012	N/A	0.52
Connor comes to Raquel's aid after she lands in jail following her car accident while driving drunk. Raquel's troubles intensify as she is fired from her latest job which leads to a humiliating offer to appear on a celebrity rehab show. Following a wild night with her co-stars Brandon and Laura, Abby's love life becomes even more complicated as she begins to have romantic feelings for both of them. Meanwhile, Nick realizes that he may keep his job after all, but his guys night out with his crackhead boss leaves Sabrina more scorned than ever. Elsewhere, Beth takes Simon to a six-hour audition where she meets and has a romantic encounter with a divorced man also taking his daughter for the same audition. Kaldrick brings Walter to live with him at his Hollywood Hills house to try to make amends. Not only does his father feel out of place, but Kaldrick's entourage resents Walter's presence causing Kaldrick to have to decide between his own father and his childhood friend, Rook. Kaldrick has troubled memories about his childhood of being chased by bullies after school and being locked out of his own house by his father who tells him to stand up to the bullies and "be a man" only to get beaten up; first by the bullies and later by his father for being a "wimp". Later, as Kaldrick drops Walter back at the halfway house, he almost tells his father that he is gay, but at the last second he decides not to and Kaldrick soon after learns that he cannot count on his own father being supportive should he ever come out when Walter privately apologizes to Kal about the harsh, near-abusive discipline he brought onto Kaldrick during his childhood because Walter wanted Kaldrick to be tough-minded to survive in this world, and he is proud of Kaldrick's music career and lavish lifestyle and that Kaldrick did not grow up to be a "fag" as Walter once thought.
12	6	"Rules of Thirds"	Stefan Brogren	Vera Santamaria	August 21, 2012	August 21, 2012	N/A	0.58
Connor has an unpleasant encounter with someone from Jennifer's past: her violent estranged husband Eric. Nick is surprised to find Sabrina up to her old dirty tricks to destroy his career yet again, and he sets out to even the score. Meanwhile, Kaldrick finds himself at a crossroads over keeping his straight image intact by pursuing a romance with a woman, named Dawna, that his father sets him up with. Beth lets her overprotective nature over Simon get the best of her on Simon's latest film set. Abby begins to realize that she might be in over her head involving her unconventional romance with Brandon and Laura. Abby then moves back into The Lux after Laura discovers her and Brandon cheating behind her back. Elsewhere, Raquel seeks to create a new image for herself on Celebrity Halfway House.
13	7	"Half Way"	Bruce McDonald	Martin Gero	August 27, 2012	August 27, 2012	N/A	0.65
Kaldrick continues to hide his homosexuality as he and Dawna begin sleeping together, but he is then faced with a lawsuit served by Infinite Jest who hires a lawyer, Christopher, to sue Kaldrick for Rook assaulting him at Kaldrick's party. Meanwhile, Connor continues to deceive Jennifer all about his abusive and troubled past as well as hide his self-harm habit of burning himself in order to keep his makeshift "happy family" back in Australia intact, while he tries to set up Jennifer's estranged husband, Eric, to make her like him again. Desperate, Raquel starts pulling the puppet strings of her new cast mates, including Ricky Lloyd, on Halfway House in order to shed her bad-girl reputation. Abby's relationship drama with Brandon and Laura causes major problems in her professional life as Laura becomes determined to destroy Abby's career. When Abby reports Laura's behavior to the show's producer, Abby is the one who gets fired. Elsewhere, Beth's efforts to smooth things over with Simon fail. Nick and Sabrina square off both on the job and off as he realizes that he must push himself to play dirty with her in order to save his job and pride.
14	8	"Stay"	Stefan Brogren	Brendan Gall	September 3, 2012	September 3, 2012	N/A	0.70
After Connor gets Jennifer and Eric back together, she decides to release Connor from his contract, but also tells him that he must move out of her house. Meanwhile, Nick searches for inspiration for his comedy routine in unexpected places. Beth becomes a nervous wreck as she, Kevin and Cam search for Simon who has run away. On Halfway House, Raquel is overwhelmed by Zack's turn of events and threatens to walk out despite being under contract. While working as an extra, Abby is romanced by Gray, a handsome stranger she meets on a beach set whom appears wealthy and claims to be a naval officer on shore leave. Elsewhere, Kaldrick meets his match after having a sexual tryst with Infinite Jest's openly gay lawyer, Christopher, who seems to know more about Kaldrick and his inner demons than Kaldrick does about himself. Connor eventually moves back into The Lux, where he faces life-changing news.
15	9	"Help Wanted"	Bruce McDonald	Vera Santamaria	September 10, 2012	September 10, 2012	N/A	0.63
Kaldrick asks Abby to record backup tracks at the studio for his new album as he has an ulterior motive to try to get her to talk about Tariq's whereabouts. Meanwhile, Nick gets fired after his sleazy and reprehensible boss begs him to take the rap for cocaine possession and Sabrina reacts surprisingly sympathetically to Nick. Connor is hit with a bombshell when Charlotte, the mysterious woman who has been following him around, reveals herself to be his long-lost sister whom he never knew existed. Raquel reaches her breaking point after she is dropped by her agent and is forced to file for bankruptcy to protect herself from multiple lawsuits. Later, through a series of circumstances, Raquel ends up landing a job as a bartender in a trendy restaurant. Elsewhere, Beth continues to ignore phone messages from her father and allows her desires for Cam to seduce him.
16	10	"Make It Right"	Peter Wellington	Carl Binder	September 17, 2012	September 17, 2012	N/A	0.74
Kaldrick and Abby set off together to find Tariq in Montreal after he confides in her about what he did. Back in Los Angeles, Charlotte introduces Connor to an interesting new religion to purge himself of his troubled memories. At The Lux, Raquel pushes Cam, Kevin, and Dita to start filming their low-budget film with her in the lead which leads to her deciding to take unethical steps to finance the film. Beth goes on another date with Cam who takes her to a local high school to take an SAT test, while Simon stays behind at The Lux with Kevin to help him work on a bubble machine. Elsewhere, Nick and Sabrina have a run-in with Sabrina's wealthy and overbearing parents whom think that she is in medical school. At Nick's urging, Sabrina makes a confession to her parents that changes everything between them when her parents react very badly to the fact that Sabrina has been lying to them for months about being in medical school and living off their allowance money, which results in Sabrina's parents financially cutting her off and completely disowning her.
17	11	"Now Or Never"	Peter Wellington	Lara Azzopardi	September 17, 2012	September 17, 2012	N/A	0.52
Kaldrick returns from Montreal where he pushes himself to make a change by reconciling with his producer, DyNasty, to record a new theme in the studio, where he runs into Infinite Jest and his crew that now includes his friend, Rook. Kaldrick accepts an offer of a dinner date with Christopher and reconciles with his father, Walter. Kaldrick decides to come out to his father, but before he can do so, a phone call rocks Kaldrick's world. Meanwhile, a desperate Raquel does whatever it takes to finance her film with Cam, Kevin, and Dita's help. Raquel's boss, Max, asks her out on a date which she declines and her co-worker, Manny, persuades her to commit credit card fraud with the bar's customers to acquire more cash. Sabrina moves in with Nick at The Lux after her parents cut her off, which leads to her spraining her back before an important comedy audition. Beth and Simon have conflicting feelings when their father suddenly returns and wants them to return to Canada with him, which Beth strongly opposes. Abby goes out on a date with Gray, who tells her that he has to ship out in three days to Afghanistan. Connor does not know whom to trust after learning that the Church of Scienetics is a front for a religious cult after he donates thousands of dollars to join.
18	12	"Xs and Os"	Martin Gero	Brendan Gall	September 24, 2012	September 24, 2012	9,000	0.57
A party is hosted at a bar, and Abby has a bit too much to drink and it leads to her marrying Gray in haste in Las Vegas. Kaldrick's world is rocked after his father, Walter, is hospitalized and lands in a coma following a massive stroke. Christopher tries to comfort Kaldrick, while Dawna finally sees through Kaldrick's double life and breaks up with him for good. Meanwhile, Raquel continues her credit card scam with Manny who begins showing off his ill-acquired wealth which arouses Max's suspicions and Raquel demanding a larger cut. Connor's past finally catches up to him when he is charged with arson and insurance fraud. Charlotte hears about his arrest and tries to take the rap for Connor burning down his house. Cam takes Beth to a university for a tour as a potential place for her to attend, while Simon stays behind to work on Cam and Kevin's film. Elsewhere, Nick takes a humiliating job of being a dress-up rabbit at a studio head daughter's bar mitzvah where he worries about being stuck in this profession. Kaldrick learns that his friend Rook stole the computer hard drive from his house (which shows Kaldrick making out with Tariq before the beating that Kaldrick gave him at the end of season 1) when he threw him out and now Infinite Jest has stolen the hard drive from him.
19	13	"Don't Say Goodbye"	Martin Gero	Martin Gero	September 24, 2012	September 24, 2012	11,000	0.39
Beth learns that her father has forcibly taken Simon away and wants take Simon with him back to Canada. Connor tells Roxanne and the members of Scienetics about Charlotte kissing him and it leads to her being taken away by the church members for "redemption" and leaving Connor feeling alone and abandoned once again. Abby has to say goodbye to Gray who leaves for Germany to return to the Air Force. After another failed audition and learning that her talent agent, Ron, had decided to drop her, the bad-luck-prone Abby is stuck all by herself once again. Meanwhile, Sabrina tells Nick that she has taken a job in New Orleans, leading Nick to choose whether to go with her or stay in L.A. and risk not seeing her ever again. Kaldrick is blackmailed by Infinite Jest for $5 million of the hard drive as to not reveal his homosexuality to the public. Kaldrick agrees to pay despite both Christopher's and Rook's objections. Raquel hosts a fundraiser at The Lux to premiere Cam and Kevin's new film. As the episode (and the series) comes to an end, Max gets arrested after Manny's credit card scam is uncovered. Conner finally tells Raquel that he self-harms due to his troubled past. Abby leaves town on a one-way flight to Germany to join Gray. Sabrina leaves on another one-way flight for New Orleans. Nick returns to the stage, alone, at the Improv Club. Beth decides to return to Canada to be close to Simon, and hopefully find a way get him back from their father. Kaldrick's father dies which leads him to deciding to come out publicly with Christopher's support by posting Kaldrick's "coming out" letter that he had written for his late father on Kaldrick's website; the letter is posted and dozens of replies come pouring in. Rook, unaware of the letter and mistakenly believing that Infinite Jest deliberately outed Kaldrick's homosexuality even after being paid off, shoots Infinite Jest to death at his home.

== Development and production ==
CTV's parent company, Bell Media, ordered six episodes of the series in August 2011. Shooting and production of the series began in mid-2011, with both Toronto and Los Angeles as primary locations.

Several hours prior to the series premiere, Bell Media announced that The L.A. Complex had been picked up by The CW to air in the United States later in the spring. On March 22, 2012, Bell Media ordered a further 13 episodes to be produced for the first season.

The CW picked up the second season of the show for the network's summer schedule, to begin airing on Tuesday, July 17, 2012. Later, starting on August 27, 2012, the series moved to Mondays 8/7c as a lead-in for repeats of the new season of America's Next Top Model.

== Reception ==
=== Critical response ===
The L.A. Complex received mostly positive reviews from critics. On Rotten Tomatoes, the first season has a fresh rating of 100% based on 11 reviews, with a weighted average of 7.22/10. The site's critics consensus reads, "The L.A. Complex appeals with natural, humorous dialogue, and a focus on the real struggles of characters in the entertainment business." On Metacritic, it has a score of 70 out of 100 based on 13 critics, indicating "generally favorable reviews".

Rob Owen of the Pittsburgh Post-Gazette gave the show a positive review stating, "For the type of show it sets out to be, this Complex is surprisingly, well, complex." Alan Sepinwall of HitFix also gave the show a positive review, describing the show as "a primetime soap, but one that's genuinely more interested in what the characters want to do for a living than in who they're sleeping with."

The TVLine team said of The L.A. Complex, "It's like everything you'd want from a CW soap, and it delivers", and added that it contains "TV's most interesting, unexpected romance." Entertainment Weekly gave the show an A− and declared that it was "summer's hidden gem", stating that it was "unexpectedly smart", and that the bad decisions of the characters made it "far more interesting, relatable, and likable than the glambots we normally see on L.A.-set dramas".

In an unfavorable review, Tom Gliatto of People Weekly described the show as a "blah drama about kids living in an LA apartment complex while hustling for big breaks."

=== Ratings ===
- The L.A. Complex premiered on January 10, 2012, in Canada. It was previewed on CTV drawing 351,000 viewers as well as 60,000 on its regular channel MuchMusic.
- Episode 2 aired January 17, 2012, on MuchMusic drawing 87,000 viewers.
- Episode 3 aired January 24, 2012, on MuchMusic drawing 40,000 viewers.
- Episode 4 aired January 31, 2012, on MuchMusic drawing 44,000 viewers.
- Episode 5 aired February 7, 2012, on MuchMusic drawing 16,000 viewers.
- Episode 6 (season finale) aired February 14, 2012, on MuchMusic drawing 22,000 viewers.

However, after its initial airing in the United States, the series received the lowest-ever ratings for a broadcast drama series premiere, despite its generally favorable reviews.

== Home media ==
On August 13, 2015, Echo Bridge Entertainment released The L.A. Complex: The Complete Series on DVD in Region 1.

== Reboot ==
On October 3, 2018, it was announced that a reboot of the series was in the works at The CW with original creator Martin Gero and writer Brendan Gall set to executive produce. The "sequel" project, hailing from Gero's production company Quinn's House in association with Warner Bros. Television, is based on the original series, but follows "a new crop of tenants who move into the Luxe hotel in the heart of Hollywood—a ragtag commune of twentysomethings all hustling to make it as actors, dancers, producers or comedians. Relationships rise and fall, beliefs and values are tested, as the drive to succeed pushes all characters to their breaking points." On February 8, 2019, The CW passed on picking up the script to pilot, reportedly due to a "numbers game" between Warner Bros. Television and The CW's other production studio CBS Television Studios. Because The CW is a joint effort between CBS and Warner Bros., the network orders an equal number of pilot episodes from each studio. However, The CW decided to keep the project in the works for the following development cycle. After Gero inked a new development deal with Universal Television in May 2020, moving away from Warner Bros. Television, he confirmed the following month on Instagram that the reboot would not happen.
