= Tommie-Amber Pirie =

Canadian actress

Tommie-Amber Pirie is a Canadian actress. She is most noted for her role as Claire in Michael: Every Day, for which she was a Canadian Screen Award nominee for Best Actress in a Comedy Series at the 1st Canadian Screen Awards in 2013.

== Early life ==
Originally from Ottawa, Pirie was a competitive figure skater at the junior level before turning to acting.

== Career ==
Pirie had her first acting role as Sally in the television miniseries H_{2}O, and her first major role as Sarah, the younger sister of Jay Baruchel's character Leon, in the film The Trotsky.

She has also appeared in the films such as, The F Word, How to Plan an Orgy in a Small Town, Below Her Mouth, The Go-Getters, James vs. His Future Self and The Retreat, and the television series Long Story, Short and Bitten.

In addition to her Canadian Screen Award nomination, she was nominated for Best Performance by an Actress by the Toronto chapter of the ACTRA Awards in 2012.

== Filmography ==
=== Film ===
Year	Title	Role	Notes
2009	The Trotsky	Sarah Bronstein	
2009	Stripped Naked	Jady	
2010	New Year	Heather Thomson	
2013	The F Word	Gretchen	
2013	The Bird Men	Laura	
2013	Out	Kezia	
2014	Pretend We're Kissing	Jordan	
2014	Don't Get Killed in Alaska	Liney	
2015	How to Plan an Orgy in a Small Town	Polly Murray	
2016	Below Her Mouth	Quinn	
2016	Tell the World	Ellen Harmon	
2017	Clusterf*ck	Vanessa	
2018	The Go-Getters	Lacie	
2019	James vs. His Future Self	Meredith	
2020	Parallel Minds	Margo Elson	
2021	The Retreat	Renee	
2023	The Amityville Curse	Abigail Blaine	
2024	The Hopeful	Ellen Harmon	
2024	A Thousand Cuts		

=== Television ===
Year	Title	Role	Notes
2004	H_{2}O	Sally	2 episodes
2007	Like Mother, Like Daughter	Sarah	Television film
2008	Girl's Best Friend	Mary Double	Television film
2008	A Teacher's Crime	Jennifer Smith	Television film
2009	Final Verdict	Lucy	Television film
2009	The Border	Hunter	Episode: "Dark Ride"
2010	18 to Life	Ava Turner	Episode: "A Modest Proposal"
2010	Living in Your Car	Mary	Episode: "Chapter Twelve"
2010	Rookie Blue	Tamara Kwan	Episode: "To Serve or Protect"
2011	Another Man's Wife	Skylar Warner	Television film
2011	My Babysitter's a Vampire	Clerk	Episode: "The Brewed"
2011–2017	Michael: Every Day	Claire Webb	17 episodes
2012	King	Pia Sodano	Episode: "Sunil Sharma"
2012	Warehouse 13	Dina	Episode: "There's Always a Downside"
2013	Lost Girl	Sylvie	Episode: "Caged Fae"
2013	Long Story, Short	Carson	5 episodes
2014	The Listener	Carly / Margeaux	Episode: "Family Secrets"
2014	Dad Drives	Trish	Episode: "TV Pilot"
2015–2016	Bitten	Paige Winterbourne	15 episodes
2017	Private Eyes	Street Musician	Episode: "Between a Doc and a Hard Place"
2017	Killjoys	Olli / Ollie / Oleana	2 episodes
2020	Country at Heart	Jenny Michaels	Television film
2021	TallBoyz	Lizzie	Episode: "Why Is He Blowing Me Kisses?"
2021	Lethal Love	Ange Hart	Television film
2021–present	Ginny & Georgia	Susan	3 episodes
2022	The Kids in the Hall	Excited Woman	Episode #1.1
2022	Children Ruin Everything	Michelle	Episode #2.1
