= Chanty Marostica =

Canadian stand-up comedian

Chanty Marostica, formerly known as Chantel Marostica, is a Canadian stand-up comedian who won SiriusXM Canada's Top Comic competition in 2018 and received a Juno Award nomination for Comedy Album of the Year at the Juno Awards of 2019 for The Chanty Show.

Marostica came out as non-binary and genderqueer in 2016, and uses gender-neutral pronouns. On September 20, 2018, Marostica came out to their parents as transgender.

Originally from Winnipeg, Manitoba, they are currently based in Toronto, Ontario. They organize a number of events for LGBTQ comedians, including Church Street Comedy nights at Pegasus, and the touring comedy show Queer and Present Danger.

Marostica won Best Breakout Artist at the 2018 Canadian Comedy Awards. In 2019, they won Best Standup and Best Comedy Album (The Chanty Show).
