= Stephnie Weir =

American actress & writer (born 1967)

- Born: Stephnie Carmel Weir; November 28, 1967 (age 58); Odessa, Texas, U.S.
- Occupations: Actress, comedienne, writer
- Years active: 1991–present
- Spouse: Robert Dassie (m. 2001)

Stephnie Carmel Weir (born November 28, 1967) is an American actress, comedienne, and writer. She is best known for being a main cast member and writer on the Fox sketch comedy television series Mad TV from 2000 to 2005, for which she got two Writers Guild of America Award nominations. She had starring roles on several short-lived television sitcoms, including Big Day (2006–2007), The Comedians (2015), and Happy Together (2018–2019), and starred in the 2017 comedy film Room for Rent.

== Career ==
Weir was a consulting producer for the comedy series Raising Hope. She also appeared in Disney's Godmothered.

=== Counter Culture ===
Counter Culture is a comedy series created by Weir that was in development for the American Broadcasting Company (ABC). The pilot follows three aging sisters running their family diner together in West Texas. ABC ordered the pilot on January 30, 2012. The ensemble cast included Kerri Kenney-Silver, Delta Burke, and Emmy Award-winning actresses Margo Martindale and Doris Roberts. The pilot was directed by Ted Wass.

==== Original characters ====
- Angela Wright
- Dot Goddard
- Dorothy Lanier
- Dr. Kylie Johnson
- Gail Cinder
- Kat
- Dot
- Kelly/Wendy Shank
- Lillie Hubscher
- Mackenzie Shaw
- Mattie Lutz
- Mrs. Leona Campbell
- Muriel Westig
- Rebecca Finkleberg/Zamula Kincaid
- Sherri
- Thelma Strom
- Vera Magnus

== Filmography ==
=== Film ===
Year	Title	Role	Notes
2000	Too Much Flesh	Connie	
2001	New Port South	Librarian	
2002	Streetriffs	Hooker Mentor	
2005	Fun with Dick and Jane	Debbie	
2006	Moonpie	Candy Peterson	
2007	Ping Pong Playa	Cheryl Davis	
2008	Eden Court	Barb	
2008	The Other Side of the Tracks	Ann	
2013	Red Lodge	Web Psychic	
2017	Fist Fight	Suzie	
2017	Room for Rent	Betty Baldwin	
2017	Wild Honey	Esther	
2020	Godmothered	Barb	

=== Television ===
Year	Title	Role	Notes
1991, 1993	Unsolved Mysteries	Motel Resident / Hotel Resident	2 episodes
1999	Cupid	Priscilla	2 episodes
2000–2005	Mad TV	Various	124 episodes; also writer (65 episodes)
2005	King of the Hill	Nureen	Episode: "Arlen City Bomber"
2006	Joey	Maureen	Episode: "Joey and the Actors Studio"
2006	Higglytown Heroes	Control Officer Hero (voice)	Episode: "Frozen Fish Folies/Look Who's Squawking"
2006–2007	Big Day	Lorna	13 episodes
2007	'Til Death	Gretchen - Psychologist	Episode: "No More Mr. Vice Guy"
2009	FlashForward	Didi Gibbons	Episode: "White to Play"
2010	Weeds	Patricia Davies	Episode: "Viking Pride"
2011	Modern Family	Mrs. Hoffman	Episode: "Our Children, Ourselves"
2013	Brenda Forever	Shelley Miller	Television film
2014	Eleven Year Itch	Stephanie	Television film
2015	Childrens Hospital	Rhonda	Episode: "Nils Vildervaan, Professional Interventiomalist"
2015	The Comedians	Kristen Laybourne	13 episodes
2015	Key & Peele	Savannah	Episode: "Y'all Ready for This?"
2015	Playing House	Jeanine Willcall	Episode: "Celebrate Me Scones"
2015	Castle	Mia Laszlo	Episode: "The Nose"
2015	Life in Pieces	Bernadette	2 episodes
2015–2017	Crazy Ex-Girlfriend	Karen	6 episodes
2016	Crowded	Ann	Episode: "Amongst the Waves"
2016	Lady Dynamite	Janice	Episode: "Pilot"
2016	Veep	Penny Nickerson	Episode: "Congressional Ball"
2016	Dream Corp LLC	Diane	Episode: "Tijuana Zebra"
2017	I Love Dick	Larchmont	2 episodes
2017	The Guest Book	Marcia	Episode: "Story Three"
2018	Grace and Frankie	Mindy	Episode: "The Expiration Date"
2018–2019	Happy Together	Bonnie / Rebethany	13 episodes
2019, 2020	The Goldbergs	Karen English	2 episodes
2020	High & Tight	Dr. Kern	Television film
2022	The Mighty Ducks: Game Changers	Marnie	4 episodes
2023	Night Court	Remecca Monte-Pulciano	Episode: "Two Peas on a Pod"
