= Seán Cullen =

Canadian actor and stand-up comedian (born 1965)

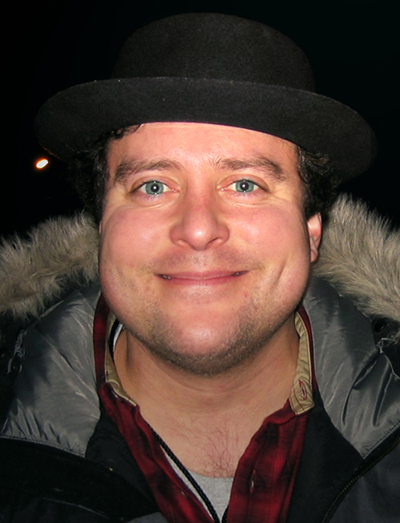
- Cullen in 2004
- Born: August 29, 1965 (age 61); Peterborough, Ontario, Canada
- Notable work: Seven Little Monsters as Four, Five, Seven; Corky and the Juice Pigs; Last Comic Standing 6; The Seán Cullen Show; George and Martha as Wilde, Eton; The Tonight Show; The Ellen Show as Guitarist, Christian Snee; Rocket Monkeys as Gus; Almost Naked Animals as Piggy, Narwhal; The Willoughbys as Barnaby A, Barnaby B
- Spouse: Kimberley Temple

Comedy career
- Years active: 1988–present
- Medium: Stand-up; television; radio
- Genres: Comedy; young adult literature
- Website: seancullen.com

Seán Cullen (born August 29, 1965) is a Canadian actor and stand-up comedian. He is known for combining improvisation with mimicry and music, as well as for providing voices of characters in television shows including Best Ed, Seven Little Monsters, and Almost Naked Animals.

== Career ==
Cullen entered into the public eye in 1987 as a member of musical comedy group Corky and the Juice Pigs. Corky and the Juice Pigs toured the world, winning awards at the Edinburgh Fringe and performing at Just for Laughs in Montreal eight times. The group was also featured on Fox's MADtv. They released two comedy albums. The group broke up in 1998, after ten years together.

Following the breakup, Cullen began performing solo, often accompanied by musician Dylan Goodhue. He wrote and mounted his own one-man show called Wood, Cheese and Children which went on to become a special in CTV's Comedy Now! series and was nominated for a Gemini Award. Also in 1998, he was in a sketch comedy show in England called Unnatural Acts.

Cullen has appeared frequently on Canadian television, including CBC's Royal Canadian Air Farce, CTV's The Associates, and The Comedy Network's Patti and Liocracy. He has appeared on American sitcoms, such as The Ellen Show and Payne. He has been a guest on The Late Late Show with Craig Kilborn, hosted NBC's Late Friday, and has been featured in comedy bits on The Tonight Show with Jay Leno in which he visits an event and interviews other attendees. He also supplied the voices of Four, Five, and Seven in the show, Seven Little Monsters. He has appeared on Comedy Central's Premium Blend, and his own Comedy Central Presents special in 2002. He also portrayed comedian Jackie Gleason in the 2002 TV movie entitled Martin and Lewis.

In 2003, Cullen produced his own sitcom, The Seán Cullen Show, for the CBC. It lasted for one six-episode season. Also at Christmas 2003, CBC aired the Seán Cullen's Home for Christmas special. Cullen hosted the 17th and 18th Annual Gemini Awards Galas in 2002 and 2003 respectively, winning a Gemini himself the latter year for hosting the former gala. He has also won awards in 2001 for his gala performance at Just for Laughs, and in 2006 for hosting What Were They Thinking?, a CTV program in which Cullen visited various unusual and somewhat inexplicable landmarks around Canada. Cullen, along with Goodhue, hosted The Just For Laughs 20th Anniversary Special on CBC.

In 2004, Cullen appeared as Max Bialystock in the Canadian production of The Producers for Mirvish Productions, earning him a Dora Mavor Award nomination. In July 2005, CBC Radio One began airing Simply Seán, a music radio program hosted by Cullen. In 2005, he hosted the documentary series What Were They Thinking? for The Comedy Network, for which he won a Gemini Award for best host in a lifestyle, practical information or performing arts program at the 21st Gemini Awards in 2006.

Cullen has a longstanding relationship with the members of the band Barenaked Ladies, formed when the band, in its original duo form, opened for Corky and the Juice Pigs on an early cross-Canada tour in 1989. On the Barenaked Ladies' 2004 U.S. and Canadian holiday tour, Cullen joined the band on the road. He would tell a comedic version of the nativity story and sing Christmas songs with band member Kevin Hearn accompanying him.

He provides the voice of Lucius Heinous VII, on the Teletoon series Jimmy Two-Shoes and Skatoony, Principal General Barrage on Detentionaire, Narwhal and Piggy on the animated series Almost Naked Animals, Blade Stabbington on the animated series Grojband, and the voice of Gus, Nefarious, and Deep Space Dave on Rocket Monkeys.

In 2008, Cullen was a contestant on NBC's Last Comic Standing 6. He became a finalist on the show, making it through the auditions, Las Vegas semi-finals, and the "house" round. Cullen made it to number six and finally was eliminated on 31 July 2008 episode after the first of two rounds of home viewer voting which determined the final winner.

In the 2010 and 2011 season of the Stratford Festival, Seán played Smee in Peter Pan, Pseudolus in A Funny Thing Happened on the Way to the Forum and Vinnie in The King of Thieves by George F. Walker. He appeared as a singing camp counsellor in the 2010 short film The Legend of Beaver Dam.

From 2011 to 2020, Cullen hosted the podcast The Seánpod, featuring interviews with guests including Alan Thicke, Norm Macdonald and Doug Benson.

Cullen is associated with Balzac's Coffee, a chain of cafés in southern Ontario. The company frequently sponsors Cullen's events, such as his comedy show, The Sean Schau!. Cullen also appears in other videos promoting the chain, exhibited on his Myspace page, and YouTube.

In 2012, Cullen was a staple character and a frequent panellist on the Canadian version of Match Game which aired on The Comedy Network, and on The Debaters on CBC Radio.

In 2020, Seán voiced the inventive, but "creepy", twin brothers, Barnaby A and Barnaby B in the Netflix original The Willoughbys.

In season 16 of Murdoch Mysteries, he guest-starred as the famous Rudyard Kipling.

== Shows ==
=== (Un)natural Acts ===
Unnatural Acts was a television comedy filmed in 1998 which was written by and starring Cullen as well as future The Mighty Boosh actors Rich Fulcher, Julian Barratt, and Noel Fielding.

=== The Seán Cullen Show ===
The Seán Cullen Show is a television comedy that appeared briefly in the summer of 2003. The show, starring Seán Cullen, aired a total of six episodes on CBC Television. The show was a surreal sitcom about the life of Seán Cullen, in which Cullen interacted directly with the studio audience and spoke directly to the television audience.

Among the highlights of the show were several songs sung by Seán Cullen in character.

==== Characters ====
- Seán Cullen – The head of the household.
- Betty (Jennifer Robertson) – A homemaker perpetually stuck in the 1950s.
- Sonny (Ted Ludzik) – The mentally challenged son of Sasquatch and Betty, who is the apple of Betty's eye.
- Frau Foch (Teresa Pavlinek) – Seán's evil genius next door neighbor who never lets anyone touch her hair.
- Sasquatch (Stephen R. Hart) – Frau's servant.
- Winston, the Cellar Dweller (Winston Spear) – A man who lives in Seán's basement.
- The Critics (Ryan & Jason Belleville) – Two men who sit in the audience and criticize the show.
- Scottish Jesus – A Scottish version of Jesus.

=== Simply Seán ===
Simply Seán was a Saturday morning entertainment radio show on the Radio One network of the Canadian Broadcasting Corporation. Hosted by Seán Cullen, it ran in the mid-2000s on the network's summer schedule in place of Go! in its timeslot.

The show consisted of Cullen giving commentary and conducting interviews interspersed with musical selections. Each show featured a segment focusing on a topic ripe for Cullen's comedic talents to riff on, including "James Bond", "Saturday Morning Cartoons", and "songs by Star Trek stars". Typical music selections included the likes of The Tragically Hip, Weakerthans, Tom Waits, and R.E.M.

The first season of the show ran for a total of 10 episodes, lasting well into the duration of the CBC lockout of 2005. All of the shows were pre-recorded prior to the lockout, and the series ended at the conclusion of its summer run.

=== The Seán Schau! ===
Since at least 2006, Cullen has hosted a comedy show entitled The Seán Schau! at the Drake Hotel Underground. The show takes the format of a late-night television talk show, including local celebrity guests, and a house band. The show also features sidekick "The Orb" — a glowing white orb on a pedestal that converses with Cullen, as well as live commercials for the show's sponsor performed by Cullen and the guests.

Cullen opens the show with a monologue and features a variety of recurring comedy bits during the show, including video segments, and improvised songs. Guests are commonly welcomed to the stage by the band and Cullen playing a sting of a classic song with the lyrics altered to include the guest's name in place of a rhyming word or phrase (for example, recurring guest Richard Crouse is usually introduced with "Brick House" altered to "Dick Crouse").

=== The Nations! ===
The Nations! is a digital series made for the Canadian Broadcasting Corporation and Television New Zealand. The series is a comedic take on reality television travel shows, on which comedians from two different countries debate the merits of their nations in a lighthearted manner. Cullen co-hosts with New Zealand comedian Jarred Christmas, exploring the best examples of each episode's theme, before asking the viewers to vote for which nation is the best on the series' website.

== Novels ==
Outside of performance, Cullen has written three books in his own Hamish X series of novels for young adults, titled Hamish X and The Cheese Pirates, Hamish X and The Hollow Mountain and Hamish X Goes To Providence, Rhode Island. The first novel won a 2007 Arthur Ellis Award for Best Juvenile Crime Book in 2007. At MIPTV 2009, it was announced that Cookie Jar Group and Sunwoo Entertainment had planned to adapt the novels into an animated series. The project would ultimately not see release.

Cullen has also started writing the Chronicles of the Misplaced Prince series. The first book The Prince of Neither here Nor There was released on 11 August 2009. The book was nominated for a 2010 Toronto Book Award. He also wrote the second book in that series, The Prince of Two Tribes.

== Discography ==
=== Corky and the Juice Pigs ===
- Corky and the Juice Pigs (1993)
- Pants (1994)

=== Solo ===
- Seán Cullen Live! (2000)
- I Am a Human Man (2008)
- Live from Planet Serpo (2014)
