= How to Plan an Orgy in a Small Town =

2015 film directed by Jeremy Lalonde

- Theatrical release poster
- Directed by: Jeremy Lalonde
- Written by: Jeremy Lalonde
- Produced by: Jordan Walker; Chris Bennett
- Starring: Jewel Staite; Ennis Esmer; Lauren Lee Smith; Katharine Isabelle; Jonas Chernick
- Cinematography: D. Gregor Hagey
- Edited by: Jeremy Lalonde
- Music by: Jeff Toyne
- Production company: Neophyte Productions
- Distributed by: Northern Banner
- Release dates: September 19, 2015 (Atlantic Film Festival); May 13, 2016 (Canada)
- Running time: 101 minutes
- Country: Canada
- Language: English

How to Plan an Orgy in a Small Town is a 2015 Canadian sex comedy film directed by Jeremy Lalonde.

== Plot ==
Cassie Cranston is a newspaper sex columnist returning to her hometown for her mother's funeral for the first time since being slut-shamed by her high school classmates who caught her trying to lose her virginity. In trouble with her publisher because many of the sex stories she has written about were actually fictional, and with her former friends and neighbours because she has often written about them as yokels and rubes, she tries to square the circle by challenging the town to plan an orgy to prove that they are not as provincial as she has depicted them, in turn giving her the opportunity to write a new true story.

== Cast ==
- Jewel Staite as Cassie Cranston
- Ennis Esmer as Adam Mitchell
- Lauren Lee Smith as Heather Mitchell
- Katharine Isabelle as Alice Solomon
- Mark O'Brien as Bruce Buck
- Tommie-Amber Pirie as Polly Murray
- Jonas Chernick as Chester O'Connell
- James McGowan as Spencer Goode
- Kristian Bruun as Seth Parsons
- Gugun Deep Singh as Gus
- Natalie Brown as Anna
- Lauren Holly as Maureen Cranston
- Noah Cappe as Otis
- Christine Horne as Ellie
- Rosemary Dunsmore as Seth's Mom
- Zoe Cleland as Young Cassie

== Release and awards ==
The film premiered at the 2015 Atlantic Film Festival. It was later screened at the 2016 Canadian Film Festival, where it won the awards for Best Feature, Best Costume Design and Best Ensemble Cast. On May 13, 2015, the film was released in select theaters and on demand in Canada by Northern Banner and in the United States by Gravitas Ventures.

== Reception ==
The film received generally negative reviews from critics. On the review aggregator website Rotten Tomatoes, 29% of 14 critics' reviews are positive, with an average rating of 4.4/10. Metacritic, which uses a weighted average, assigned the film a score of 39 out of 100, based on 5 critics, indicating "generally unfavorable" reviews.

Richard Roeper of the Chicago Sun-Times gave the film a negative score of 1.5 stars out of 4, criticizing the script, which he wrote "alternates between broad shtick, often set to cheeky pop music that only serves to hammer home the overacting and the stagey sequences, and “heavy” moments of truth that feel clunky and forced." Diego Semerene of Slant Magazine gave the film half a star out of four, writing that "The ingenuity of writer-director Jeremy LaLonde’s How to Plan an Orgy in a Small Town ends with its title", and described the characters as behaving "like caricatures moved by uninspired dialogue, not desire." Seattle Times reviewer Moira McDonald gave a mixed review, describing the film as "sporadically funny and cheerfully tasteless in its low-budget way, but it’s also unevenly acted, a bit overlong and never quite as daring as it seems to want to be."

Conversely, Peter Howell of the Toronto Star gave the film 3 stars out of 4, writing the film was "about social anxiety, with Lalonde and his strong ensemble cast smartly illustrating the tyranny of expectations, in and out of the bedroom."
