= Pogey Beach =

2018 Canadian film

- Directed by: Jeremy Larter
- Written by: Jason Larter; Jeremy Larter; Robbie Moses; Geoff Read
- Produced by: Jason Larter; Jeremy Larter; Robbie Moses; Geoff Read
- Starring: Celia Owen; Dennis Trainor; Robbie Carruthers; Ryan Cameron
- Cinematography: Ray Lavers
- Edited by: Jeremy Larter; Thom Smalley
- Production company: Rear Gear Productions
- Release date: September 14, 2018 (AFF)
- Running time: 94 minutes
- Country: Canada
- Language: English

Pogey Beach is a 2018 Canadian comedy film, directed by Jeremy Larter. Spun off from the web series Just Passing Through, whose characters were fans of an in-universe television series called Pogey Beach, the film depicts the world inside the show-within-a-show through a storyline centred on Bethany (Celia Owen), a teenage girl who moves from Toronto to Tracadie, Prince Edward Island with her father Winslow (Dennis Trainor), and becomes fascinated by the diverse personalities who hang out at the local beach.

The film also stars Robbie Carruthers as Gary Gallant, the leader of the local beach gang who values his leisurely lifestyle and will do almost anything to avoid being sent to work at the local fish plant, and Ryan Cameron as his archrival Lyle MacDonald.

== Production ==
The film was funded in part by a Kickstarter campaign, and shot in 2016. However, the team ran out of money to finish the final edit, until receiving a production grant from the Atlantic office of Telefilm Canada in late 2017.

The film premiered at the Atlantic International Film Festival in 2018.

== Awards ==
The film won the Canadian Comedy Award for Best Feature Film at the 19th Canadian Comedy Awards in 2019. It also received nominations for Best Direction in a Feature Film (Larter) and Best Writing in a Feature Film (Jeremy Larter, Jason Larter, Geoff Read, Robbie Moses).
