= Aaron Abrams =

Canadian actor and writer

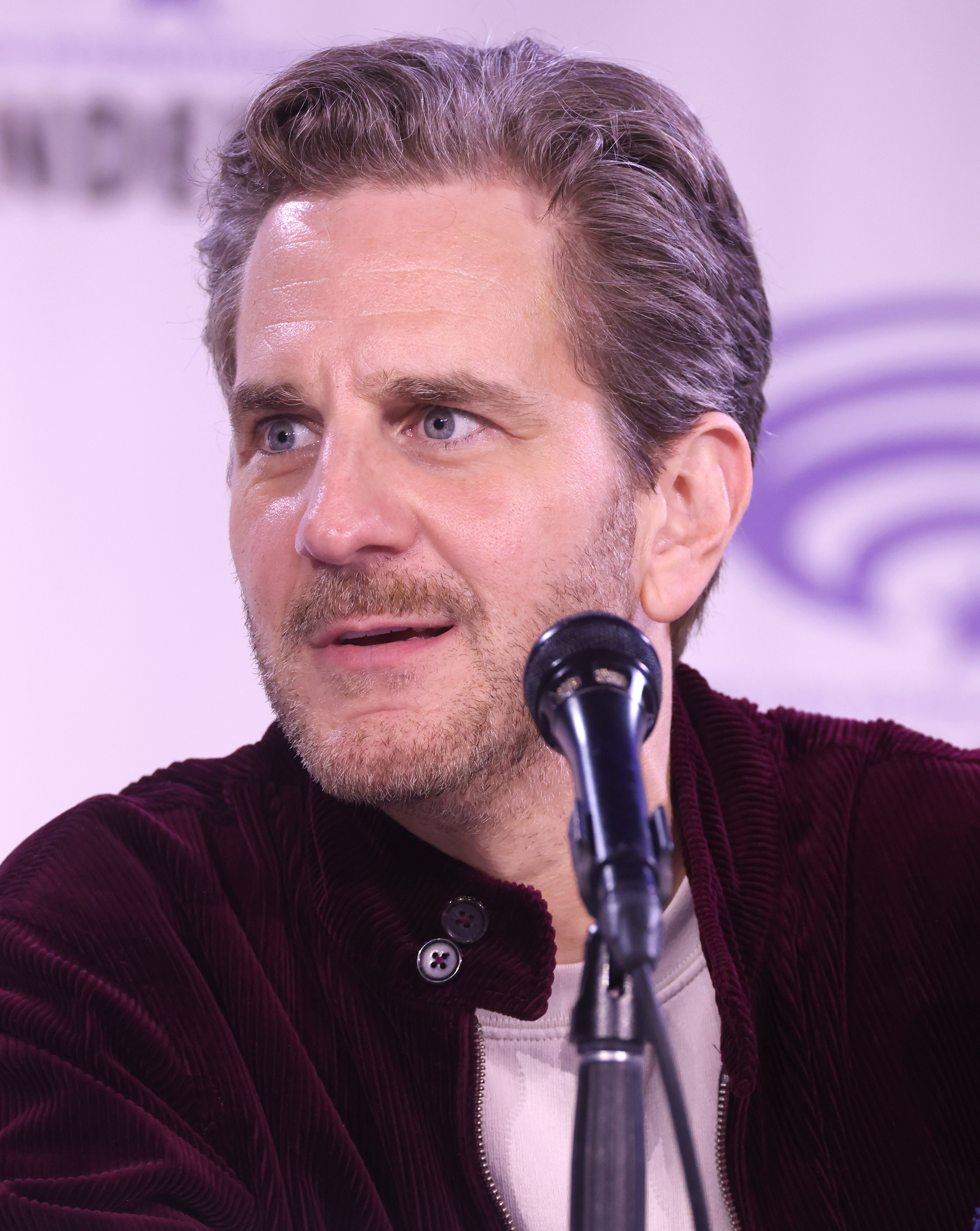
- Abrams in 2025
- Education: DePaul University (BFA)
- Occupations: Actor; screenwriter; film producer
- Years active: 2003–present

Aaron Abrams is a Canadian actor and writer, who has worked in both film and television.

Aaron Abrams has appeared in several regular and recurring roles for television, including Children Ruin Everything, Masters of Sex, Rookie Blue, Slings & Arrows, Longmire, The Oath, Blindspot, Blue Bloods and Hannibal. He also has had supporting roles in dramas Amelia with Hilary Swank, Flash of Genius with Greg Kinnear and the Code 8 franchise. Aaron Abrams has also written and produced several films, most notably the Netflix hit comedy The Lovebirds starring Kumail Nanjiani and Issa Rae. He has also written and produced critically acclaimed comedies The Go-Getters and Young People Fucking, as well as the television series The L.A. Complex.

== Filmography ==
=== Film ===
Year	Title	Role	Notes
2003	The In-Laws	Student	
2003	The Gospel of John	Man in temple crowd #3	
2004	Resident Evil: Apocalypse	Assistant	
2004	Safe	Manny	Short film
2004	Siblings	Pastor	
2005	Sabah	Paramedic	
2005	Cinderella Man	1928 fan	
2006	Zoom	Corporal Lipscombe	Uncredited
2006	Couldn't Be Happier	Dwayne	Short film
2007	Firehouse Dog	Policeman at bridge	
2007	Young People Fucking	Matt	Also writer and executive producer
2007	Paradise	Mitch	Short film
2008	Flash of Genius	Ian Meillor	
2008	Cyborg Soldier	Tyler Voller	
2009	At Home by Myself...With You	Guy	
2009	Amelia	Slim Gordon	
2010	The Chicago 8	Lee Weiner	
2011	Dave vs Death	Dave Kane	Short film
2011	Take This Waltz	Aaron	
2011	388 Arletta Avenue	Alex	
2012	Jesus Henry Christ	Malcolm's dad / Nurse Stewart	
2013	It Was You Charlie	Tom	
2015	Closet Monster	Peter Madly	
2015	Never Happened	Grady	Short film
2015	Regression	Farrell	
2016	Code 8	Freddie Berko	Short film
2016	The Press Conference	Mark	Short film
2016	Enfant Terrible	Jack	Short film
2017	From Jennifer	Ralph Sinclair	
2018	Final Offer	Henry	Short film
2018	The Open House	Brian Wallace	
2018	Nose to Tail		
2018	The Go-Getters	Owen	Also writer
2019	Code 8	Davis	
2020	The Lovebirds	Paramedic	Also writer and producer
2024	Code 8: Part II	Davis	
2024	Levels	Hunter	
2025	Clown in a Cornfield	Dr. Glenn Maybrook	
2025	Best Boy	Lawrence	

=== Television ===
Year	Title	Role	Notes
2003	Ice Bound: A Woman's Survival at the South Pole	Patient #2	Television film
2003	Tarzan	Ralph	Episode: "Surrender"
2003, 2006	Slings & Arrows	Paul	6 episodes
2004	Kevin Hill	Sexy water delivery guy	Episode: "Making the Grade"
2005	This Is Wonderland	Security guard	2 episodes
2005	Kojak	Anthony "Tone" Tosetti	Episode: "All That Glitters"
2005	Trump Unauthorized	Paparazzi reporter	Television film
2005	Stargate Atlantis	Kanayo	2 episodes
2006	The State Within	Matthew Weiss	6 episodes
2006, 2008	Runaway	Tannen	4 episodes
2007	The Jane Show	Garth Gardiner	Episode: "A Jane in the Crowd"
2007	'Til Death Do Us Part	Ben Milford	Episode: "Murder Mystery Weekend"
2007	Little Mosque on the Prairie	Dave Sharpe	Episode: "Public Access"
2008	MVP	Rob Cartwright	Episode: "Double Overtime"
2009	Flashpoint	Joel Graves	Episode: "Business as Usual"
2009	The Good Times Are Killing Me	Gary	Television film
2009	The Dating Guy	Archangel (voice)	Episode: "Bonnie & Mark"
2009	12 Men of Christmas	Les Pizula	Television film
2009–2011	Producing Parker	Simon Nolan (voice)	26 episodes
2010–2011	Rookie Blue	Detective Donovan Boyd	8 episodes
2011	Bob's Burgers	—N/a	Consulting producer (12 episodes)
2011	NCIS: Los Angeles	Hector Lee	Episode: "Overwatch"
2011	Mayday	Patrick Harten	Episode: "Hudson River Runway"
2012	The L.A. Complex	Ricky Lloyd	6 episodes
2013	Played	Marcus Jakes	Episode: "Fights"
2013–2015	Hannibal	Brian Zeller	26 episodes
2014	Longmire	Vogel	Episode: "Ashes to Ashes"
2014	Republic of Doyle	Dr. Jon Ronan	4 episodes
2014	NCIS	Todd Price	Episode: "The Searchers"
2015	CSI: Cyber	Patrick Murphy	Episode: "Killer En Route"
2016	Faking It	Josh	Episode: "Third Wheels"
2016	Murder in the First	Doug Schwartz	Episode: "Follow the Money"
2016	Masters of Sex	Randy	3 episodes
2016–2020	Blindspot	Matthew Weitz	23 episodes
2017	Grey's Anatomy	Lance	Episode: "In the Air Tonight"
2018	Spider-Man	Tinkerer / Old Baseball Fan / Police Officer (1) (voice)	2 episodes
2022	Children Ruin Everything	James	Main role
2023	Quantum Leap	Sgt. Ronny Abrams	Episode: "This Took Too Long!"
