= My 90-Year-Old Roommate =

Canadian comedy web series

My 90-Year-Old Roommate is a Canadian comedy web series, which premiered in 2016 on the Canadian Broadcasting Corporation's Punchline comedy web platform. Created by Ethan Cole, the series stars Cole as a fictionalized version of himself, an underemployed young man who moves in with his recently widowed 90-year-old grandfather Joe (Paul Soles). The series was produced by LoCo Motion Pictures.

At the 5th Canadian Screen Awards in 2017, Soles won the award for Best Actor in a Digital Program or Series.
