= Brendan Gall =

Canadian writer, actor and producer

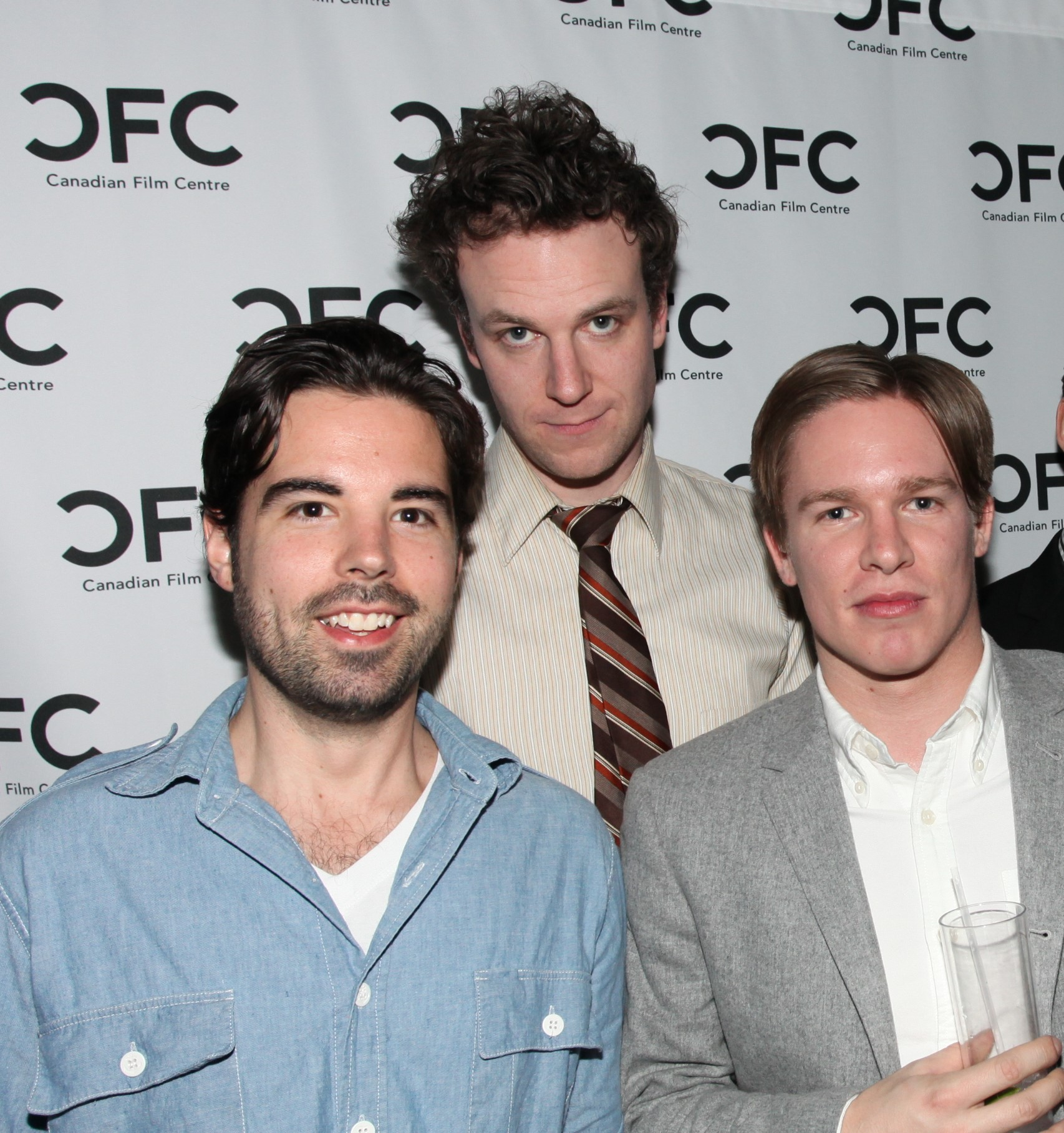
- Gall (back) with Shawn Myrick and Rob Scarborough (front)
- Born: September 2, 1978 (age 47); Halifax, Nova Scotia, Canada
- Occupations: film and television writer, producer, actor, playwright
- Writing career
- Period: 2000s-present
- Notable works: Blindspot, The L.A. Complex, The Go-Getters, Dakota, Wide Awake Hearts, Alias Godot, A Quiet Place
- Website: imdb.me/brendangall

Brendan Gall (born September 2, 1978) is a Canadian writer, actor and producer living in Toronto, Ontario.

== Early life and education ==
Gall graduated from the George Brown Theatre School.

== Career ==
Gall has written and/or produced for the television series Blindspot, Open Heart, and The L.A. Complex, the CBC Radio drama series Afghanada, the feature films The Lovebirds, The Go-Getters, and Dakota, and stage plays such as Panhandled, A Quiet Place, Alias Godot and Wide Awake Hearts.

As an actor, he has had lead or recurring roles on the series Remedy, Good God, Overruled!, and Men With Brooms, and guest appearances on Covert Affairs, The L.A. Complex, Against The Wall, Flashpoint, Murdoch Mysteries, and Stargate: Atlantis. He has also appeared in the films Remember, The Captive, Stag, Let's Rap and Dakota, and in numerous theatrical works, including the world premiere (and subsequent remounts) of Hannah Moscovitch's East of Berlin and the 2014 Toronto production of Duncan Macmillan's Lungs which garnered him a 2014 Dora Mavor Moore Award nomination for Best Actor.

A playwright in residence at Toronto's Tarragon Theatre from 2007 to 2017 and artistic director of his own theatre companies Single Threat and The Room, he has been nominated for four Dora Mavor Moore Awards for Outstanding New Play: twice in 2008 for Alias Godot and A Quiet Place, again in 2009 for The Gladstone Variations, and finally in 2011 for Wide Awake Hearts. Wide Awake Hearts and A Quiet Place were published by Coach House Books in 2010 under the title Minor Complications: Two Plays. The title was a shortlisted nominee in the English-language drama category of the 2011 Governor General's Awards. Gall has also been nominated twice for the K.M. Hunter Artist Award.

== Bibliography ==
Screenplays

- 2020: The Lovebirds
- 2017: The Go-Getters (with Aaron Abrams)
- 2007: Dakota

Teleplays

- 2017: Blindspot (7 episodes)
- 2015: Open Heart (2 episodes)
- 2012: The L.A. Complex (6 episodes)

Stage Plays

- 2010: Wide Awake Hearts
- 2010: Red Machine: Under The Knife (collective creation)
- 2010: 300 Tapes (collective creation)
- 2009: Red Machine: Part One (contributing writer: "First & Last")
- 2008: Alias Godot
- 2008 The Sound Plays (contributing writer: "A Book On Tape")
- 2007: The Gladstone Variations (contributing writer: "The Card Trick", with Mike McPhaden, Rick Roberts, Julie Tepperman)
- 2007: I Keep Dropping Sh*t (collective creation)
- 2006: Don't Wake Me (collective creation)
- 2006: Autoshow (contributing writer: "Hawk Limited")
- 2005: A Quiet Place
- 2005: Head-Smashed-In Buffalo Jump (collective creation)
- 2004: Panhandled
- 2003: The Awesome Club Presents "It's Raining Fun!" (contributed sketches)

Collections

- 2010: Minor Complications: Two Plays, Coach House Books; ISBN 978-1552452370

== Awards and nominations ==
- 2015: Lungs - Dora Mavor Moore Award nomination, Best Actor
- 2014: Lungs - My Theatre Award nomination, Best Actor
- 2014: K.M. Hunter Artist Award nomination, Theatre
- 2011: Minor Complications: Two Plays - Governor General's Literary Award for Drama nomination, English-Language Category
- 2011: Wide Awake Hearts - Dora Mavor Moore Award nomination, Best New Play
- 2011: Men With Brooms - Canadian Comedy Awards nomination, Best Ensemble
- 2010: K.M. Hunter Artist Award nomination, Theatre
- 2009: Alias Godot - Dora Mavor Moore Award nomination, Best New Play
- 2009: East of Berlin - Elizabeth Sterling Haynes Award nomination, Best Actor
- 2008: A Quiet Place - Dora Mavor Moore Award nomination, Best New Play
- 2008: The Gladstone Variations - Dora Mavor Moore Award nomination, Best New Play
- 2003: A Quiet Place - Herman Voaden National Playwriting Award, Honourable Mention
