= TheGATE.ca =

- Website type: Online Entertainment, Lifestyle, and Travel Magazine
- Available in: English
- Founded: 1999
- Headquarters: Toronto, Ontario, {{{location_country}}}
- Owner: W. Andrew Powell
- Website: www.thegate.ca
- Launched: November 2000
- Current status: Active

TheGATE.ca, referred to as The GATE, is a Canadian online website that reports on movies, television, music, leisure travel, and events, with reviews, news, and interviews.

Launched in November 2000, The GATE is owned and operated by W. Andrew Powell with contributions from a variety of writers freelance contributors.

In 2022, The GATE celebrated more than 20 years of publishing, sharing retrospective articles and social media posts featuring videos, photos, and audio from the publication's archives. The publication also launched memberships on its website and YouTube channel.

As of May, 2025, The GATE reported serving 91,000 unique visitors per month.

Major coverage highlights throughout the year include the Toronto International Film Festival, Juno Awards, the Academy Awards, and an annual series of Holiday Gift Guides.

== History ==
Founded in 1999 as a small zine by W. Andrew Powell. The zine was available in bars and restaurants in downtown Toronto until 2003.

The GATE covered music as the website's main focus until 2001 when the website launched. At that time, the publication expanded to cover movies, followed by television, and video games by late in 2002.

For several years, The GATE's film reviews by Powell were syndicated to publications across Canada, including Lighthouse Publishing in Nova Scotia, CFB Esquimalt Lookout newspaper in British Columbia, and The Squamish Chief in Alberta.

Since 2001, Powell has represented The GATE as a guest entertainment expert on U8TV's Shower Hour, Much Music's Ed's Big Wham Bam, AM640's travel radio program Planes, Trains and Automobiles, Hamilton's CHAM 820 Nabuurs and Friends, and in Eye Weekly's Annual Cross-Canada Music Critics Poll.

Notably in 2011, Canadian newspaper advertising for the opening weekend of the Walt Disney Pictures release Pirates of the Caribbean: On Stranger Tides featured a quote from Powell, "Pirates is back and it's better than ever!"

The Government of Canada has contributed funds to The GATE through various grants, including the Business Innovation component of the Canada Periodical Fund. Announcements were made by the government on September 7, 2012 and on March 17, 2014.

In November 2021, Powell was accepted into the Critics Choice Association as a voting member.

The GATE unveiled a new logo and branding in February 2022.

== Notable interviews ==
- 50 cent
- Colin Farrell
- Cobie Smulders
- Priyanka Chopra
- Tatiana Maslany
- Edward James Olmos
- Shawn Ashmore
- Anna Silk
- Melanie Berry, President and CEO of CARAS and MusiCounts
- Beau Bridges
- Bruce Campbell
- Tom Felton
- Terry Gilliam
- Emm Gryner
- Hugh Hefner
- Stan Lee
- Stuart McLean
- Sam Neill
- Jayde Nicole
- Mickey Rourke
- Kari Skogland
- Kevin Smith
- Brent Spiner
- Riley Steele
- Edgar Wright
- Zim Zum

== Statistics ==
TheGATE.ca is ranked in the top 25,000 most visited websites in Canada according to Alexa.
