= Canadian Screen Award for Best Comedy Series =

Annual Canadian television award

- Country: Canada
- Presented by: Academy of Canadian Cinema & Television
- First award: 1986
- Currently held by: North of North (2025)
- Website: academy.ca/awards

The Academy of Canadian Cinema and Television presents an annual award for Best Comedy Series.

== History ==
Formerly presented as part of the Gemini Awards program, since 2013 the award has been presented as part of the expanded Canadian Screen Awards.

== 1980s ==
Year	Program	Producers	Network	Ref
1986; 1st Gemini Awards	Seeing Things	Martin Wiener, Louis Del Grande, David Barlow	CBC	
1986; 1st Gemini Awards	Four on the Floor	Morgan Earl	CBC	
1986; 1st Gemini Awards	Hangin' In	Joe Partington, Jack Humphrey	CBC	
1987; 2nd Gemini Awards	Seeing Things	Martin Wiener, Louis Del Grande, David Barlow	CBC	
1987; 2nd Gemini Awards	Hangin' In	Joe Partington, Jack Humphrey	CBC	
1988; 3rd Gemini Awards	No award presented			
1989; 4th Gemini Awards	CODCO	J. William Ritchie, Michael Donovan	CBC	

== 1990s ==
Year	Program	Producers	Network	Ref
1990; 5th Gemini Awards	Material World	Katie Ford, Joe Partington	CBC	
1990; 5th Gemini Awards	Mosquito Lake	Charles Falzon, Carol Commisso	CBC	
1991; 6th Gemini Awards	CODCO	J. William Ritchie, Stephen Reynolds, Jack Kellum, Michael Donovan	CBC	
1991; 6th Gemini Awards	The Kids in the Hall	Joe Forristal, Lorne Michaels	CBC	
1991; 6th Gemini Awards	Maniac Mansion	Michael Short, Peter Sussman, Jamie Paul Rock, Seaton McLean, Eugene Levy	YTV	
1992; 7th Gemini Awards	The Kids in the Hall	Cindy Park, Joe Forristal, Jeffrey Berman, Lorne Michaels	CBC	
1992; 7th Gemini Awards	Maniac Mansion	Michael Short, Peter Sussman, Jamie Paul Rock, Barry Jossen, Eugene Levy	YTV	
1992; 7th Gemini Awards	The Red Green Show	Steve Smith	CHCH	
1993; 8th Gemini Awards	The Kids in the Hall	Cindy Park, Joe Forristal, Jeffrey Berman, John Blanchard, Lorne Michaels	CBC	
1993; 8th Gemini Awards	Maniac Mansion	Michael Short, Peter Sussman, Jamie Paul Rock, Seaton McLean, Eugene Levy	YTV	
1993; 8th Gemini Awards	The Red Green Show	Steve Smith, Ron Lillie, William Johnston	CHCH	
1994; 9th Gemini Awards	This Hour Has 22 Minutes	Jenipher Ritchie, Jack Kellum, Gerald Lunz, Geoff D'Eon, Michael Donovan	CBC	
1994; 9th Gemini Awards	The Kids in the Hall	Cindy Park, Jeff Ross, Jeffrey Berman, John Blanchard, Lorne Michaels	CBC	
1994; 9th Gemini Awards	Royal Canadian Air Farce	Roger Abbott, Don Ferguson	CBC	
1995; 10th Gemini Awards	This Hour Has 22 Minutes	Jenipher Ritchie, Jack Kellum, Gerald Lunz, Geoff D'Eon, Michael Donovan	CBC	
1995; 10th Gemini Awards	Comics!	Sandra Faire, Joe Bodolai, Pam McFarlane	CBC	
1995; 10th Gemini Awards	The Kids in the Hall	Betty Orr, Jim Biederman, John Blanchard, Jeffrey Berman, Lorne Michaels	CBC	
1995; 10th Gemini Awards	Married Life	Martin Katz, Jan Peter Meyboom	TMN	
1995; 10th Gemini Awards	The Red Green Show	Steve Smith, William Johnston, Ron Lillie	Global	
1995; 10th Gemini Awards	Royal Canadian Air Farce	Roger Abbott, Don Ferguson, Brian Robertson	CBC	
1996; 11th Gemini Awards	This Hour Has 22 Minutes	Jenipher Ritchie, Jack Kellum, Gerald Lunz, Geoff D'Eon, Michael Donovan	CBC	
1996; 11th Gemini Awards	Comics!	Sandra Faire, Joe Bodolai, Pam McFarlane	CBC	
1996; 11th Gemini Awards	The Red Green Show	Steve Smith, William Johnston, Ron Lillie	Global	
1997; 12th Gemini Awards	This Hour Has 22 Minutes	Marilyn Richardson, Jack Kellum, Gerald Lunz, Geoff D'Eon, Michael Donovan	CBC	
1997; 12th Gemini Awards	Dave Broadfoot: Old Enough To Say What I Want	Roger Abbott, Don Ferguson	CBC	
1997; 12th Gemini Awards	The Newsroom	Jan Peter Meyboom, Ken Finkleman	CBC	
1997; 12th Gemini Awards	The Red Green Show	Steve Smith	Global	
1997; 12th Gemini Awards	Royal Canadian Air Farce	Roger Abbott, Don Ferguson	CBC	
1998; 13th Gemini Awards	This Hour Has 22 Minutes	Andrew McInnes, Jack Kellum, Gerald Lunz, Geoff D'Eon, Michael Donovan	CBC	
1998; 13th Gemini Awards	The Dish Show	Martha Kehoe	The Comedy Network	
1998; 13th Gemini Awards	More Tears	Jan Peter Meyboom, Ken Finkleman	CBC	
1998; 13th Gemini Awards	The Red Green Show	Steve Smith	CBC	
1998; 13th Gemini Awards	Twitch City	Bruce McDonald, Susan Cavan	CBC	
1999; 14th Gemini Awards	Made in Canada	Marilyn Richardson, Gerald Lunz, Linda Nelson, Michael Donovan	CBC	
1999; 14th Gemini Awards	Comedy Now! — "Elvira Kurt: Big Girl Now"	Trish Dayot, Sandra Faire	CTV, The Comedy Network	
1999; 14th Gemini Awards	Double Exposure	Bob Robertson, Linda Cullen, Nick Orchard	CTV	
1999; 14th Gemini Awards	The Red Green Show	Steve Smith	CBC	
1999; 14th Gemini Awards	Royal Canadian Air Farce	Roger Abbott, Don Ferguson	CBC	

== 2000s ==
Year	Program	Producers	Network	Ref
2000; 15th Gemini Awards	This Hour Has 22 Minutes	Geoff D'Eon, Michael Donovan, Jack Kellum, Mark Farrell, Ginny Jones-Duzak	CBC	
2000; 15th Gemini Awards	Bob and Margaret	David Fine, Alison Snowden, Michael Hirsh, Patrick Loubert	Global	
2000; 15th Gemini Awards	Dave Broadfoot: Old Dog, New Tricks	Roger Abbott, Don Ferguson	CBC	
2000; 15th Gemini Awards	Double Exposure	Bob Robertson, Linda Cullen, Nick Orchard	CTV	
2000; 15th Gemini Awards	Made in Canada	Gerald Lunz, Michael Donovan	CBC	
2000; 15th Gemini Awards	Royal Canadian Air Farce	Roger Abbott, Don Ferguson	CBC	
2001; 16th Gemini Awards	Made in Canada	Gerald Lunz, Michael Donovan	CBC	
2001; 16th Gemini Awards	John Callahan's Quads!	Judy Malmgren, Michael Hirsh, Clive A. Smith, Marianne Culbert, Patricia R. Burns, Stephen Hodgins, John Tatoulis, John Callahan, Deborah Levin, Patrick Loubert	Teletoon	
2001; 16th Gemini Awards	Jonovision	Richard Mortimer, Lynn Harvey	CBC	
2001; 16th Gemini Awards	The Red Green Show	Steve Smith	CBC	
2001; 16th Gemini Awards	This Hour Has 22 Minutes	Susan MacDonald, Michael Donovan, Geoff D'Eon, Jack Kellum, Mark Farrell, Ginny Jones-Duzak	CBC	
2002; 17th Gemini Awards	An American in Canada	Howard Busgang, Sari Friedland	CBC	
2002; 17th Gemini Awards	Buzz	Daryn Jones, Michael MacKinnon, Morgan Smith, Merilyn Read	The Comedy Network	
2002; 17th Gemini Awards	Made in Canada	Gerald Lunz, Michael Donovan	CBC	
2002; 17th Gemini Awards	This Hour Has 22 Minutes	Jenipher Ritchie, Mark Farrell, Susan MacDonald, Jack Kellum	CBC	
2002; 17th Gemini Awards	Women of the Night	Milan Curry-Sharples, Sandra Faire, Bronwyn Warren, Trisa Dayot	CTV	
2003; 18th Gemini Awards	This Hour Has 22 Minutes	Jenipher Ritchie, Mark Farrell, Susan MacDonald, Jack Kellum, Geoff D'Eon, Michael Donovan	CBC	
2003; 18th Gemini Awards	The Gavin Crawford Show	Kyle Tingley, Ron Murphy, Virginia Rankin	The Comedy Network	
2003; 18th Gemini Awards	Lord Have Mercy!	Claire Prieto, Frances-Anne Solomon, Vance Chapman	Vision TV	
2003; 18th Gemini Awards	Puppets Who Kill	John Pattison, Shawn Alex Thompson, John Leitch, Rob Mills	The Comedy Network	
2003; 18th Gemini Awards	Trailer Park Boys	Mike Clattenburg, Michael Volpe, Barrie Dunn	Showcase	
2004; 19th Gemini Awards	Trailer Park Boys	Mike Clattenburg, Michael Volpe, Barrie Dunn	Showcase	
2004; 19th Gemini Awards	Corner Gas	Brent Butt, Mark Farrell, David Storey, Virginia Thompson	CTV	
2004; 19th Gemini Awards	The Newsroom	Ken Finkleman, Jan Peter Meyboom	CBC	
2004; 19th Gemini Awards	Puppets Who Kill	John Pattison, Marianne Culbert, John Leitch, Shawn Alex Thompson	The Comedy Network	
2004; 19th Gemini Awards	The Red Green Show	Steve Smith, David A. Smith	CBC	
2004; 19th Gemini Awards	This Hour Has 22 Minutes	Jenipher Ritchie, Mark Farrell, Susan MacDonald, Jack Kellum, Geoff D'Eon, Michael Donovan	CBC	
2005; 20th Gemini Awards	Corner Gas	Paul Mather, Mark Farrell, Brent Butt, David Storey, Virginia Thompson	CTV	
2005; 20th Gemini Awards	History Bites	David C. Smith, Rick Green	The Comedy Network	
2005; 20th Gemini Awards	The Newsroom	Ken Finkleman, Jan Peter Meyboom	CBC	
2005; 20th Gemini Awards	Puppets Who Kill	John Pattison, Marianne Culbert, John Leitch, Shawn Alex Thompson	The Comedy Network	
2005; 20th Gemini Awards	This Hour Has 22 Minutes	Jenipher Ritchie, Mark Farrell, Susan MacDonald, Jack Kellum, Geoff D'Eon, Michael Donovan	CBC	
2006; 21st Gemini Awards	Corner Gas	Paul Mather, Mark Farrell, Brent Butt, David Storey, Virginia Thompson	CTV	
2006; 21st Gemini Awards	History Bites	David C. Smith, Rick Green	History	
2006; 21st Gemini Awards	Jeff Ltd.	Jeff Seymour	CTV	
2006; 21st Gemini Awards	Kenny vs. Spenny	Kenny Hotz, Abby Finer, Ira Levy, John Morayniss, Spencer Rice, Kirsten Scollie, Christine Shipton, Peter Williamson	Showcase	
2006; 21st Gemini Awards	Naked Josh	Jacques Blain, André Béraud	Showcase	
2006; 21st Gemini Awards	Rick Mercer Report	Gerald Lunz, Rick Mercer	CBC	
2007; 22nd Gemini Awards	Corner Gas	Paul Mather, Brent Butt, David Storey, Virginia Thompson	CTV	
2007; 22nd Gemini Awards	Odd Job Jack	Denny Silverthorne, Adrian Carter, Jonas Diamond, Jeremy Diamond	The Comedy Network	
2007; 22nd Gemini Awards	Rent-a-Goalie	Christopher Bolton, Chris Szarka	Showcase	
2007; 22nd Gemini Awards	Royal Canadian Air Farce	Roger Abbott, Don Ferguson	CBC	
2007; 22nd Gemini Awards	This Hour Has 22 Minutes	Jenipher Ritchie, Mark Farrell, Susan MacDonald, Jack Kellum, Geoff D'Eon, Michael Donovan	CBC	
2008; 23rd Gemini Awards	This Hour Has 22 Minutes	Jenipher Ritchie, Mark Farrell, Susan MacDonald, Jack Kellum, Geoff D'Eon	CBC	
2008; 23rd Gemini Awards	Cock'd Gunns	Andrea Gorfolova, Brooks Gray, Andy King, Shaam Makan, Leo Scherman, Morgan Waters	Showcase	
2008; 23rd Gemini Awards	Corner Gas	Mark Farrell, Brent Butt, David Storey, Virginia Thompson, Kevin White	CTV	
2008; 23rd Gemini Awards	Kenny vs. Spenny	Ira Levy, Abby Finer, Noreen Halpern, Kenny Hotz, Amy Marcella, John Morayniss, Trey Parker, Spencer Rice, Kirsten Scollie, Matt Stone, Peter Williamson	Showcase	
2008; 23rd Gemini Awards	Odd Job Jack	Jonas Diamond, Adrian Carter, Jeremy Diamond, Denny Silverthorne	The Comedy Network	
2008; 23rd Gemini Awards	Rent-A-Goalie	Christopher Bolton, Chris Szarka	Showcase	
2009; 24th Gemini Awards	Rick Mercer Report	Rick Mercer, Gerald Lunz	CBC	
2009; 24th Gemini Awards	Less Than Kind	Chris Sheasgreen, Mark McKinney, Kirsten Scollie, Jan Peter Meyboom, Peter Williamson, Ira Levy, Phyllis Laing, Marvin Kaye, Amy Marcella	Citytv	
2009; 24th Gemini Awards	Testees	Kenny Hotz, Jonathan Walker, Amy Marcella, Suzanne L. Berger, Derek Harvie, John Morayniss, Michael Rosenberg	Showcase	
2009; 24th Gemini Awards	This Hour Has 22 Minutes	Jenipher Ritchie, Mark Farrell, Susan MacDonald, Jack Kellum, Michael Donovan	CBC	
2009; 24th Gemini Awards	Three Chords from the Truth	Henry Less, Sissy Federer-Less, Phyllis Ellis, Steve Cochrane, Adriana Maggs	CMT	

== 2010s ==
Year	Program	Producers	Network	Ref
2010; 25th Gemini Awards	Less Than Kind	Garry Campbell, Ira Levy, Peter Williamson, Phyllis Laing, Paula J. Smith, Chris Sheasgreen, Marvin Kaye, Mark McKinney	HBO	
2010; 25th Gemini Awards	Dan for Mayor	Paul Mather, Mark Farrell, Kevin White	CTV	
2010; 25th Gemini Awards	Little Mosque on the Prairie	Mary Darling, Colin Brunton, Clark Donnelly, Michael Snook, Al Magee	CBC	
2010; 25th Gemini Awards	Pure Pwnage	Jarett Cale, Geoff Lapaire	Showcase	
2010; 25th Gemini Awards	Rick Mercer Report	Gerald Lunz, Rick Mercer	CBC	
2011; 26th Gemini Awards	Rick Mercer Report	Gerald Lunz, Rick Mercer	CBC	
2011; 26th Gemini Awards	Call Me Fitz	David MacLeod, Michael Souther, Teza Lawrence, Noreen Halpern, Laszlo Barna, Sheri Elwood, John Morayniss, Michael Rosenberg	HBO	
2011; 26th Gemini Awards	Good Dog	Scott Garvie, Christina Jennings, Laura Harbin, Ken Finkleman, Avi Federgreen, Jan Peter Meyboom	HBO	
2011; 26th Gemini Awards	Halifax Comedy Fest 2010	Geoff D'Eon	CBC	
2011; 26th Gemini Awards	Living in Your Car	Dani Romain, David Steinberg, George F. Walker, Debbie Nightingale	HBO	
2011; 26th Gemini Awards	This Hour Has 22 Minutes	Michael Donovan, Susan MacDonald, Tim McAuliffe, Jenipher Ritchie	CBC	
2012; 1st Canadian Screen Awards	Less Than Kind	Ira Levy, Phyllis Laing, Marvin Kaye, Mark McKinney, Chris Sheasgreen, Paula J. Smith, Peter Williamson, Garry Campbell	HBO	
2012; 1st Canadian Screen Awards	Good God	Christina Jennings, Ken Finkleman, Scott Garvie, Jan Peter Meyboom	HBO	
2012; 1st Canadian Screen Awards	Kenny Hotz's Triumph of the Will	Jeff Kassel, Kenny Hotz, John Morayniss, Noreen Halpern, Jamie Tiernay, Margaret O'Brien	Action	
2012; 1st Canadian Screen Awards	Michael: Tuesdays and Thursdays	Sari Friedland, Bob Martin, Don McKellar, Niv Fichman	CBC	
2012; 1st Canadian Screen Awards	Mr. D	Gerry Dee, Michael Volpe	CBC	
2013; 2nd Canadian Screen Awards	Call Me Fitz	David MacLeod, Dennis Heaton, John Morayniss, Matt MacLennan, Michael Souther, Noreen Halpern, Sheri Elwood, Teza Lawrence	HBO	
2013; 2nd Canadian Screen Awards	Gavin Crawford's Wild West	David Fortier, Gavin Crawford, Ivan Schneeberg, Kyle Tingley	CBC	
2013; 2nd Canadian Screen Awards	Mr. D	Gerry Dee, Michael Volpe	CBC	
2013; 2nd Canadian Screen Awards	Seed	Gillian Lowrey, Joseph Raso, John Ritchie, Karen Wentzell, Mark Farrell, Paula J. Smith, Rob Bromley	Citytv	
2013; 2nd Canadian Screen Awards	Tiny Plastic Men	Camille Beaudoin, Eric Rebalkin	Super Channel	
2014; 3rd Canadian Screen Awards	Call Me Fitz	Sheri Elwood, Teza Lawrence, David MacLeod, Matt MacLennan, John Morayniss, Margaret O'Brien, Jason Priestley, Derek Schreyer, Michael Souther	HBO	
2014; 3rd Canadian Screen Awards	Mr. D	Gerry Dee, Michael Volpe	CBC	
2014; 3rd Canadian Screen Awards	Seed	Rob Bromley, Mark Farrell, Gillian Lowrey, Joseph Raso, John Ritchie, Paula J. Smith, Karen Wentzell	Citytv	
2014; 3rd Canadian Screen Awards	Spun Out	Kim Arnott, Andrew Barnsley, Jeff Biederman, Colin Brunton, Karyn Edwards, Brent Piaskoski, Brian K. Roberts	CTV	
2014; 3rd Canadian Screen Awards	Tiny Plastic Men	Camille Beaudoin, Jesse Lipscombe, Eric Rebalkin	Super Channel	
2015; 4th Canadian Screen Awards	Schitt's Creek	Eugene Levy, Dan Levy, Andrew Barnsley, Fred Levy, Ben Feigin, Michael Short, Kevin White, Colin Brunton	CBC	
2015; 4th Canadian Screen Awards	Mr. D	Gerry Dee, Michael Volpe	CBC	
2015; 4th Canadian Screen Awards	Mohawk Girls	Catherine Bainbridge, Christina Fon, Linda Ludwick, Ernest Webb, Tracey Deer, Cynthia Knight	APTN/Omni	
2015; 4th Canadian Screen Awards	Tiny Plastic Men	Camille Beaudoin, Jesse Lipscombe, Eric Rebalkin	Super Channel	
2015; 4th Canadian Screen Awards	Young Drunk Punk	Tom Cox, Jordy Randall, Bruce McCulloch, Susan Cavan, Paula J. Smith	Citytv	
2016; 5th Canadian Screen Awards	Letterkenny	Mark Montefiore, Patrick O'Sullivan, Jared Keeso, Jacob Tierney	Crave	
2016; 5th Canadian Screen Awards	Kim's Convenience	Ivan Fecan, Tim Gamble, Alexandra Raffé, Leslie Lester, Albert Schultz, Ins Choi, Kevin White	CBC	
2016; 5th Canadian Screen Awards	Mohawk Girls	Catherine Bainbridge, Christina Fon, Linda Ludwick, Ernest Webb, Tracey Deer, Cynthia Knight	APTN/Omni	
2016; 5th Canadian Screen Awards	Mr. D	Gerry Dee, Michael Volpe	CBC	
2016; 5th Canadian Screen Awards	Schitt's Creek	Ben Feigin, Eugene Levy, Dan Levy, Andrew Barnsley, Fred Levy, Michael Short, Kevin White, Colin Brunton	CBC	
2017; 6th Canadian Screen Awards	Kim's Convenience	Ivan Fecan, Ins Choi, Kevin White, Alexandra Raffe, Anita Kapila, Sandra Cunningham	CBC	
2017; 6th Canadian Screen Awards	Letterkenny	Mark Montefiore, Patrick O'Sullivan, Jared Keeso, Jacob Tierney	Crave	
2017; 6th Canadian Screen Awards	Michael: Every Day	Don McKellar, Bob Martin, Matt Watts, Niv Fichman, Sari Friedland	CBC	
2017; 6th Canadian Screen Awards	Nirvanna the Band the Show	Matt Johnson, Jay McCarrol, Curt Lobb, Matthew Miller, Jared Raab, Jim Czarnecki, Danny Gabai, Michael Kronish, Spike Jonze, Eddy Moretti, Shane Smith, Victoria Lean, Patrick McGuire, Daniel Morin	Citytv	
2017; 6th Canadian Screen Awards	Workin' Moms	Catherine Reitman, Philip Sternberg, Tina Horwitz	CBC	
2018; 7th Canadian Screen Awards	Schitt's Creek	Eugene Levy, Daniel Levy, Andrew Barnsley, Fred Levy, Ben Feigin, Michael Short, David West Read, Colin Brunton	CBC	
2018; 7th Canadian Screen Awards	Letterkenny	Mark Montefiore, Jared Keeso, Jacob Tierney, Kara Haflidson	Crave	
2018; 7th Canadian Screen Awards	Mr. D	Michael Volpe, Gerry Dee, Jessie Gabe	CBC	
2018; 7th Canadian Screen Awards	Second Jen	Don Ferguson, Amanda Joy, Lucy Stewart, Samantha Wan, Kevin Wallis, Nataline Rodrigues	Citytv	
2018; 7th Canadian Screen Awards	Workin' Moms	Catherine Reitman, Philip Sternberg, Tina Horwitz, Joe Sorge, Jonathan A. Walker	CBC	
2019; 8th Canadian Screen Awards	Schitt's Creek	Eugene Levy, Daniel Levy, Andrew Barnsley, Fred Levy, David West Read, Ben Feigin, Michael Short, Rupinder Gill, Colin Brunton	CBC	
2019; 8th Canadian Screen Awards	Jann	Jann Arden, Leah Gauthier, Jennica Harper, Andrew Barnsley, Ben Murray, Jordy Randall, Tom Cox, Randy Lennox, Brian Dennis	CTV	
2019; 8th Canadian Screen Awards	Kim's Convenience	Ivan Fecan, Ins Choi, Kevin White, Alex Raffé, Anita Kapila, Matt Kippen, Kurt Smeaton, Sandra Cunningham	CBC	
2019; 8th Canadian Screen Awards	Letterkenny	Jared Keeso, Jacob Tierney, Mark Montefiore, Kara Haflidson	Crave	
2019; 8th Canadian Screen Awards	Workin' Moms	Catherine Reitman, Philip Sternberg, Tina Horwitz, Jillian Locke, Jonathan Walker	CBC	

== 2020s ==
Year	Program	Producers	Network	Ref
2020; 9th Canadian Screen Awards	Schitt's Creek	Eugene Levy, Daniel Levy, Andrew Barnsley, Fred Levy, David West Read, Ben Feigin, Michael Short, Kurt Smeaton, Kosta Orfanidis	CBC	
2020; 9th Canadian Screen Awards	Baroness von Sketch Show	Jamie Brown, Carolyn Taylor, Meredith MacNeill, Aurora Browne, Jennifer Whalen, Sally Karam, Jeff Peeler	CBC	
2020; 9th Canadian Screen Awards	Kim's Convenience	Ivan Fecan, Ins Choi, Kevin White, Alexandra Raffé, Anita Kapila, Matt Kippen, Kurt Smeaton, Sandra Cunningham	CBC	
2020; 9th Canadian Screen Awards	Letterkenny	Jared Keeso, Jacob Tierney, Mark Montefiore, Kara Haflidson	Crave	
2020; 9th Canadian Screen Awards	Workin' Moms	Catherine Reitman, Philip Sternberg, Tina Horwitz, Joe Sorge, Jonathan Walker, Jillian Locke	CBC	
2021; 10th Canadian Screen Awards	Sort Of	Bilal Baig, Fab Filippo, Jennifer Kawaja, Julia Sereny, Bruno Dubé	CBC	
2021; 10th Canadian Screen Awards	Jann	Andrew Barnsley, Benjamin Murray, Jordy Randall, Tom Cox, Jann Arden, Jennica Harper, Leah Gauthier, Randy Lennox, Dean Bennett, Ron Murphy, Mike McPhaden	CTV	
2021; 10th Canadian Screen Awards	Kim's Convenience	Ivan Fecan, Ins Choi, Kevin White, Alexandra Raffé, Anita Kapila, Matt Kippen, Sandra Cunningham	CBC	
2021; 10th Canadian Screen Awards	Letterkenny	Jared Keeso, Jacob Tierney, Mark Montefiore, Kara Haflidson	Crave	
2021; 10th Canadian Screen Awards	Strays	Ivan Fecan, Kevin White, Alexandra Raffé, Sandra Cunningham, Anita Kapila	CBC	
2022; 11th Canadian Screen Awards	Sort Of	Jennifer Kawaja, Bruno Dubé, Bilal Baig, Fab Filippo	CBC	
2022; 11th Canadian Screen Awards	Astrid and Lilly Save the World	Betsy Van Stone, Noelle Stehman, Lance Samuels, Daniel Iron, Armand Leo, Danishka Esterhazy, Neil Tabatznik, Samantha Levine, Rob Blackie, Peter Blackie, John Vatcher	CTV Sci-Fi Channel	
2022; 11th Canadian Screen Awards	Children Ruin Everything	Mark Montefiore, Chuck Tatham, Kurt Smeaton, Meaghan Rath	CTV	
2022; 11th Canadian Screen Awards	Fakes	David Turko, Lilly Burns, Tony Hernandez, Jake Fuller, Simon Barry, Stephen Hegyes	CBC Gem, Netflix	
2022; 11th Canadian Screen Awards	Letterkenny	Jared Keeso, Jacob Tierney, Mark Montefiore, Kara Haflidson	Crave	
2023; 12th Canadian Screen Awards
2023; 12th Canadian Screen Awards	Bria Mack Gets a Life	Sasha Leigh Henry, Mark Montefiore, Tania Thompson, Angelique Knights, Tamar Bird	Crave	
2023; 12th Canadian Screen Awards	Letterkenny	Mark Montefiore, Jared Keeso, Jacob Tierney, Kara Haflidson	Crave	
2023; 12th Canadian Screen Awards	Shelved	Anthony Q. Farrell, Anton Leo, Shane Corkery, Dan Bennett, Jay Vaidya, Aleysa Young, Colin Brunton	CTV	
2023; 12th Canadian Screen Awards	Son of a Critch	Mark Critch, Tim McAuliffe, Andrew Barnsley, Allan Hawco, Ben Murray, Perry Chafe, John Vatcher, Amanda Joy, Rob Blackie	CBC	
2023; 12th Canadian Screen Awards	Workin' Moms	Catherine Reitman, Philip Sternberg, Jonathan A. Walker, Lisa Benedetto, Tina Horwitz, Jessie Gabe, Karen Kicak, Daniel Gold	CBC	
2024; 13th Canadian Screen Awards
2024; 13th Canadian Screen Awards	Children Ruin Everything	Mark Montefiore, Kurt Smeaton, Meaghan Rath, Anita Kapila, Chuck Tatham, Andrew De Angelis, Kathleen Phillips, Alyson Richards, Max Wolfond	CTV	
2024; 13th Canadian Screen Awards	Don't Even	Laszlo Barna, Nicole Butler, Vanessa Steinmetz, Karen Tsang, Jamie Brown, Stephanie Fast, Amber-Sekowan Daniels, Zoe Leigh Hopkins, Karen Hill, Lori Lozinski	Crave, APTN	
2024; 13th Canadian Screen Awards	Late Bloomer	Laszlo Barna, Nicole Butler, Vanessa Steinmetz, Jasmeet Raina, Baljinder (Ricky) Dhawan, Shebli Zarghami, Lakna Edirisinghe, Robbie David	Crave	
2024; 13th Canadian Screen Awards	The Office Movers	Dan Bennett, Shane Corkery, Anton Leo, Jermaine Richards, Trevaunn Richards, Clara Altimas, Robbie David	Crave	
2024; 13th Canadian Screen Awards	One More Time	Dan Bennett, Shane Corkery, Anton Leo, D.J. Demers, Jessie Gabe, Dane Clark, Melanie Orr, Colin Brunton	CBC	
2025; 14th Canadian Screen Awards
2025; 14th Canadian Screen Awards	North of North	Stacey Aglok MacDonald, Alethea Arnaquq-Baril, Miranda de Pencier, Garry Campbell, Anya Adams, Susan Coyne, Teresa M. Ho, Mike Goldbach, Fabrizio Filippo, Patricia Curmi	CBC Television	
2025; 14th Canadian Screen Awards	Children Ruin Everything	Mark Montefiore, Kurt Smeaton, Meaghan Rath, Anita Kapila, Chuck Tatham, Andrew De Angelis, Kathleen Phillips, Alyson Richards, Max Wolfond	CTV	
2025; 14th Canadian Screen Awards	Late Bloomer	Jasmeet Raina, Peter Huang, Ricky Dhawan, Shebli Zarghami, Laszlo Barna, Nicole Butler, Vanessa Steinmetz, Robbie David, Lakna Edirisinghe	Crave	
2025; 14th Canadian Screen Awards	Son of a Critch	Mark Critch, Andrew Barnsley, Tim McAuliffe, Allan Hawco, Perry Chafe, Amanda Joy, Shelby Bronstine, John Vatcher, Erin Sullivan, Janine Squires	CBC Television	
2025; 14th Canadian Screen Awards	The Trades	Gary Howsam, Ryan J. Lindsay, Robb Wells, Jonathan A. Walker	Crave	

== Multiple awards and nominations ==
Shows that received multiple awards
Awards	Show
8	This Hour Has 22 Minutes
4	Schitt's Creek
3	Corner Gas
2	Call Me Fitz
2	CODCO
2	The Kids in the Hall
2	Less Than Kind
2	Made in Canada
2	Rick Mercer Report
2	Seeing Things
2	Sort Of

Shows that received multiple nominations
Nominations	Show
15	This Hour Has 22 Minutes
9	The Red Green Show
8	Letterkenny
6	Mr. D
6	Royal Canadian Air Farce
5	Corner Gas
5	The Kids in the Hall
5	Schitt's Creek
5	Workin' Moms
4	Kim's Convenience
4	Made in Canada
4	Rick Mercer Report
3	Call Me Fitz
3	Less Than Kind
3	Maniac Mansion
3	The Newsroom
3	Puppets Who Kill
3	Tiny Plastic Men
