= Kurt Smeaton =

Canadian writer-producer

Kurt Smeaton is a Canadian television writer and producer from Ottawa, Ontario, most noted for his work on Kim's Convenience, Schitt's Creek and Children Ruin Everything.

He began his career as an actor, most notably as a regular cast member in the sketch comedy series The Holmes Show, before turning to writing and producing.

== Awards ==
Award	Year	Category	Work	Result	Ref(s)
Canadian Comedy Awards	2011	Best Writing in a Program or Series	Men with Brooms: "Wedding Knells" (with Paul Mather, Mike McPhaden, Renee Percy, James Phillips, Graham Wagner)	Nominated	
Canadian Screen Awards	2018	Best Writing in a Variety or Sketch Comedy Program or Series	The Beaverton: "Episode 201" (with Jeff Detsky, Luke Gordon Field, Alexander Saxton, Jacob Duarte Spiel, Pat Dussault, Nile Séguin, Wendy Litner, Winter Tekenos Levy)	Nominated	
Canadian Screen Awards	2020	Best Comedy Series	Kim's Convenience (with Ivan Fecan, Ins Choi, Kevin White, Alex Raffé, Anita Kapila, Matt Kippen, Sandra Cunningham)	Nominated	
Canadian Screen Awards	2021	Best Comedy Series	Schitt's Creek (with Eugene Levy, Daniel Levy, Andrew Barnsley, Fred Levy, David West Read, Ben Feigin, Michael Short, Kosta Orfanidis)	Won	
Canadian Screen Awards	2021	Best Comedy Series	Kim's Convenience (with Ivan Fecan, Ins Choi, Kevin White, Alexandra Raffé, Anita Kapila, Matt Kippen, Sandra Cunningham)	Nominated	
Canadian Screen Awards	2021	Best Writing in a Comedy Series	Kim's Convenience: "Knife Strife"	Nominated	
Canadian Screen Awards	2023	Best Comedy Series	Children Ruin Everything (with Mark Montefiore, Chuck Tatham, Meaghan Rath)	Nominated	
Canadian Screen Awards	2023	Best Writing in a Comedy Series	Children Ruin Everything: "Road Trip"	Nominated	
Canadian Screen Awards	2023	Best Writing in a Comedy Series	Children Ruin Everything: "Space" (with Jessica Meya)	Nominated	
Canadian Screen Awards	2024	Best Writing in a Comedy Series	Children Ruin Everything: "Arguments"	Won	
Primetime Emmy Awards	2020	Outstanding Comedy Series	Schitt's Creek (with Eugene Levy, Dan Levy, Andrew Barnsley, Fred Levy, David West Read, Ben Feigin, Michael Short, Kosta Orfanidis	Won	
Producers Guild of America Awards	2021	Best Episodic Comedy	Schitt's Creek (with Eugene Levy, Dan Levy, Andrew Barnsley, Fred Levy, David West Read, Ben Feigin, Michael Short, Kosta Orfanidis	Won	
WGC Screenwriting Awards	2021	Best Writing, Comedy	Schitt's Creek: "Sunrise, Sunset" (with Winter Tekenos Levy)	Nominated	
WGC Screenwriting Awards	2023	Best Writing, Comedy	Children Ruin Everything: "Road Trip"	Won	
WGC Screenwriting Awards	2024	Best Writing, Comedy	Children Ruin Everything: "Arguments"	Nominated	
WGC Screenwriting Awards	2024	Best Writing, Comedy	Children Ruin Everything: "Therapy" (with Jessica Meya)	Nominated	
