= Ron Murphy (director) =

Canadian film and television director

Ron Murphy is a Canadian film and television director, best known as a director of many episodes of the comedy series Trailer Park Boys.

He began his career as a personal assistant to John Candy in the late years of the actor's life, before moving into television directing in the 1990s with the children's financial educational television series Street Cents, and the comedy pilots The Daily Blade and Bowlerama. He became more widely known in the early 2000s for his work on The Gavin Crawford Show and Train 48.

Although he was not associated with the original 2001-2007 run of Trailer Park Boys, he directed the entire run of the followup series The Drunk and On Drugs Happy Funtime Hour, and became a frequent director of Trailer Park Boys when it was revived in the mid-2010s, including the entirety of the upcoming 13th season. From 2019 through 2022, he directed every episode of the television comedy series Jann, including the finale Christmas special.

His feature film directorial debut, Back in Black, entered production in 2025. It premiered in the Centrepiece program at the 2026 Toronto International Film Festival.

== Awards ==
| Award | Date of ceremony | Category | Work | Result | Ref(s) |
|---|---|---|---|---|---|
| Canadian Comedy Awards | 2001 | Best Direction in a Series | The Gavin Crawford Show | Nominated | |
| Canadian Comedy Awards | 2003 | Best Direction in a Series | The Gavin Crawford Show | Nominated | |
| Canadian Comedy Awards | 2004 | Best Direction in a Series | The Gavin Crawford Show | Nominated | |
| Canadian Screen Awards and Gemini Awards | 2002 | Best Direction in a Variety Program or Series | Sonic Temple with Joan Tosoni | Nominated | |
| Canadian Screen Awards and Gemini Awards | 2003 | Best Comedy Series | The Gavin Crawford Show with Kyle Tingley, Virginia Rankin | Nominated | |
| Canadian Screen Awards and Gemini Awards | 2006 | Best Direction in a Drama Series | ReGenesis: "Gene in a Bottle" | Nominated | |
| Canadian Screen Awards and Gemini Awards | 2006 | Best Direction in a Children's or Youth Program or Series | Dark Oracle: "TrailBlaze" | Nominated | |
| Canadian Screen Awards and Gemini Awards | 2016 | Best Direction in a Comedy Series | Young Drunk Punk: "The Clash Is Coming" | Nominated | |
| Canadian Screen Awards and Gemini Awards | 2022 | Best Comedy Series | Jann with Andrew Barnsley, Benjamin Murray, Jordy Randall, Tom Cox, Jann Arden, Jennica Harper, Leah Gauthier, Randy Lennox, Dean Bennett, Mike McPhaden | Nominated | |
| Canadian Screen Awards and Gemini Awards | 2023 | Best Dramatic Series | SkyMed with Vanessa Piazza, Julie Puckrin | Nominated | |
| Canadian Screen Awards and Gemini Awards | 2024 | Best Variety or Entertainment Special | Jann: Alone for the Holidays with Andrew Barnsley, Jordy Randall, Tom Cox, Jann Arden, Jennica Harper, Ben Murray, Leah Gauthier, Dean Bennett, Mike McPhaden, Randy Lennox | Nominated | |
