= List of awards and nominations received by Dan Levy =

Dan Levy awards and nominations
Awards and nominations
Award	Wins	Nominations
Golden Globe	0	1
Emmy Awards	4	6
Screen Actors Guild Awards	1	3

Dan Levy is a Canadian actor, writer, director, and comedian.

He co-created, wrote and starred in the sitcom Schitt's Creek (2015-2020), and hosted Saturday Night Live in 2021.

In 2020 he received the Human Rights Campaign Visibility Award. He also received six Primetime Emmy Award nominations winning for Outstanding Comedy Series, Outstanding Directing for a Comedy Series, Outstanding Writing for a Comedy Series and Outstanding Supporting Actor in a Comedy Series for Schitt's Creek. He also received the Screen Actors Guild Award for Outstanding Performance by an Ensemble in a Comedy Series and a nomination for the Golden Globe Award for his work on Schitt's Creek.

== Major associations ==
=== Emmy Awards ===
Year	Category	Nominated work	Result	Ref.
Primetime Emmy Awards
2019	Outstanding Comedy Series	Schitt's Creek	Nominated	
2020	Outstanding Comedy Series	Schitt's Creek	Won	
2020	Outstanding Supporting Actor in a Comedy Series	Schitt's Creek	Won	
2020	Outstanding Directing for a Comedy Series	"Happy Ending" (with Andrew Cividino)	Won	
2020	Outstanding Writing for a Comedy Series	"Happy Ending"	Won	
2021	Outstanding Guest Actor in a Comedy Series	Saturday Night Live	Nominated	

=== Golden Globe Awards ===
Year	Category	Nominated work	Result	Ref.
2021	Best Supporting Actor – Series, Miniseries or Television Film	Schitt's Creek	Nominated	

=== Screen Actors Guild Awards ===
Year	Category	Nominated work	Result	Ref.
2019	Outstanding Ensemble in a Comedy Series	Schitt's Creek	Nominated	
2021	Outstanding Actor in a Comedy Series	Schitt's Creek	Nominated	
2021	Outstanding Ensemble in a Comedy Series	Schitt's Creek	Won	

== Canadian awards ==
=== ACTRA Awards ===
Year	Category	Nominated work	Result	Ref.
2017	Members' Choice Series Ensemble	Schitt's Creek	Nominated	
2018	Members' Choice Series Ensemble	Schitt's Creek	Nominated	
2019	Members' Choice Series Ensemble	Schitt's Creek	Won	

=== Canadian Screen Awards ===
Year	Category	Nominated work	Result	Ref.
2016	Best Comedy Series	Schitt's Creek	Won	
2016	Best Writing in a Comedy Program or Series	Schitt's Creek	Won	
2016	Best Actor in a Continuing Leading Comedic Role	Schitt's Creek	Nominated	
2016	Best Cross-Platform Project, Fiction	Schitt's Creek	Nominated	
2017	Best Performance by an Actor in a Continuing Leading Comedic Role	Schitt's Creek	Nominated	
2017	Best Comedy Series	Schitt's Creek	Nominated	
2018	Best Writing in a Comedy Program or Series	Schitt's Creek	Nominated	
2018	Best Actor in a Continuing Leading Comedic Role	Schitt's Creek	Nominated	
2019	Best Comedy Series	Schitt's Creek	Won	
2019	Best Direction in a Comedy Program or Series (with Andrew Cividino)	Schitt's Creek	Nominated	
2019	Best Writing in a Comedy Program or Series	Schitt's Creek	Nominated	
2019	Best Performance by an Actor in a Continuing Leading Comedic Role	Schitt's Creek	Nominated	
2020	Radius Award	Schitt's Creek	Awarded	
2020	Best Comedy Series	Schitt's Creek	Won	
2020	Best Actor in a Continuing Leading Comedic Role	Schitt's Creek	Nominated	
2020	Best Direction in a Comedy Series	"Life is a Cabaret" (with Andrew Cividino)	Nominated	
2020	Best Writing in a Comedy Series or Program	"Housewarming" (with Rupinder Gill)	Nominated	
2020	Best Writing in a Comedy Series or Program	"Meet the Parents"	Nominated	
2021	Best Comedy Series	Schitt's Creek	Won	
2021	Best Actor in a Continuing Leading Comedic Role	Schitt's Creek	Nominated	
2021	Best Direction in a Comedy Series	"Happy Ending" (with Andrew Cividino)	Won	
2021	Best Writing in a Comedy Series or Program	"Happy Ending"	Won	
2026	Best Feature Length Documentary	Lilith Fair: Building A Mystery (with Ally Pankiw, Christina Piovesan, Noah Segal)	Nominated	

== Miscellaneous awards ==
Year	Award	Category	Work	Result	Ref.
2018	MTV Movie & TV Awards	MTV Movie Award for Best Comedic Performance	Schitt's Creek	Nominated	
2019	MTV Movie & TV Awards	MTV Movie Award for Best Comedic Performance	Schitt's Creek	Won	
2019	GLAAD Media Awards	Davidson/Valentini Award	Schitt's Creek	Awarded	
2019	Critics' Choice Television Awards	Best Supporting Actor in a Comedy Series	Schitt's Creek	Nominated	
2020	Dorian Awards	TV Performance of the Year – Actor	Schitt's Creek	Nominated	
2020	Dorian Awards	Wilde Wit of the Year	Schitt's Creek	Nominated	
2020	Producers Guild of America Awards	Danny Thomas Award for Outstanding Producer of Episodic Television – Comedy	Schitt's Creek	Nominated	
2020	Human Rights Campaign	HRC Visibility Award	Schitt's Creek	Awarded	
2020	GLAAD Media Awards	Outstanding Comedy Series	Schitt's Creek	Won	
2021	Critics' Choice Television Awards	Best Supporting Actor in a Comedy Series	Schitt's Creek	Won	
2021	Critics' Choice Television Awards	Best Comedy Series	Schitt's Creek	Nominated	
2021	AACTA International Awards	Best Actor in a Series	Schitt's Creek	Nominated	
