= What Would Sal Do? =

- Created by: Andrew De Angelis; Mark Montefiore
- Starring: Dylan Taylor; Jennifer Dale; Ryan McDonald; Kaniehtiio Horn; Scott Thompson
- Country of origin: Canada
- No. of episodes: 8

Production
- Running time: 30 min.
- Production company: New Metric Media

Original release
- Network: CraveTV; Super Channel
- Release: March 24, 2017

What Would Sal Do? is a Canadian television comedy series, which premiered on CraveTV in 2017 and aired on Super Channel in 2018.

The series stars Dylan Taylor as Sal, an aimless and self-centred underachiever in Sudbury, Ontario, who discovers that he is actually the Second Coming of Jesus Christ, and must learn to become a better person in preparation for his destiny. The series also stars Jennifer Dale as his mother Maria, Ryan McDonald as his best friend Vince, Kaniehtiio Horn as his love interest Nicole, and Scott Thompson as Father Luke.

The cast also includes Robin Brûlé, Jason Blicker, K. Trevor Wilson, Jesse Camacho, Jim Calarco, Eric Peterson, Paula Brancati, Sean Cullen, Scott Cavalheiro and Lisa Codrington in supporting roles.

According to series creator Andrew DeAngelis, the series is not meant to mock religion per se, but to simply explore the concept of an antihero striving to become a better person.

== Plot ==
Sal Camilucci (Taylor) is a slacker and small-time criminal in Sudbury, Ontario, whose mother Maria (Dale) reveals to him that she was a virgin when she became pregnant with him and demands that he start performing good deeds in preparation for his destiny as the Second Coming of Christ. He is initially disbelieving and unwilling, and instead tries to stay on his current life path with the aid of his friend Vince (McDonald) — but he seems to have a knack for stumbling into opportunities to perform small-scale miracles in the process, such as when he gets into a jail fight in the first episode and his punch to a blind man's face restores his sight.

Sal is also trying to win the love of Nicole (Horn), a masseuse at his favourite rub and tug parlour, but she doesn't see a stable future with him and instead starts to date his childhood nemesis Darryl (Cavalheiro), who is now a wealthy and confident lawyer who has offered to pay for Nicole to go back to school to pursue her dream of becoming an artist.

At the time of Sal's conception, Maria was in a relationship with Joe (Blicker); as they had never had sex, Joe believed that Maria had cheated on him, and started having an affair of his own with her sister Lena (Brûlé), who is now his wife. Maria has never gotten over her feelings for Joe, which has caused friction in her relationship with her sister as Lena believes that Maria is still trying to steal Joe back, while remaining oblivious to the hypocrisy of having stolen Joe from Maria in the first place.

Father Luke (Thompson), the only other person who knew about the circumstances of Sal's birth prior to Maria revealing them to Sal, continually tries to step in unsolicited as Sal's spiritual advisor, while simultaneously trying to manage his declining congregation and angling to get appointed as a bishop.

== Production and airing ==
The series began production in Sudbury in August 2015. According to De Angelis, the original concept had been to set the show in Toronto, but once the decision was made to film in Sudbury they chose to set the show there as well, because the city's own status as a former hardscrabble blue collar mining town that had evolved into a more thriving city helped to illuminate the show's themes.

It was originally slated to air on Super Channel in 2016, but was dropped by the network after parent company Allarcom filed for bankruptcy protection, and was then acquired by Bell Media. In January 2017, CraveTV announced that the show would be added to its streaming lineup, premiering on March 24.

In early promotion, Taylor noted that he tried to play Sal as a fundamentally good person who had become a "douchebag" due to his upbringing. Dale highlighted Maria as "a completely unique and original role like nobody has ever seen before", while Thompson praised Father Luke as one of the first times he had ever been cast in a role that represented a departure from his established public image as a pioneering openly gay comedian, and allowed him to just play a character without the "baggage" of his work in The Kids in the Hall.

Early coverage of the Crave acquisition indicated that the show would also air on HBO Canada at a later date, although this did not occur; instead, the show was then reacquired by Super Channel following its discharge from creditor protection. Super Channel aired it in 2018 and took over streaming rights, with the show moving from Crave back to Super Channel's premium streaming channel on Amazon Prime.

The series was not renewed for a second season.

== Critical reception ==
John Doyle of The Globe and Mail praised the show, comparing it favourably to Trailer Park Boys, My Name Is Earl and Letterkenny.

== Awards ==
The show garnered three Canadian Screen Award nominations at the 5th Canadian Screen Awards in 2017, for Best Actress in a Comedy Series (Dale), Best Supporting Actor in a Comedy Series (McDonald) and Best Writing in a Comedy Series (DeAngelis for "Punches Pilot".)

== Episode list ==
No. overall	No. in season	Title	Directed by	Written by	Original release date
1	1	"Punches Pilot"	Samir Rehem	Andrew De Angelis	March 24, 2017
2	2	"Sal and the Bullies"	Samir Rehem	Mark De Angelis	March 24, 2017
3	3	"The First Stone"	Samir Rehem	Andrew De Angelis, Mark Levine	March 24, 2017
4	4	"Loaves and Fishes"	Samir Rehem	Mark Forward	March 24, 2017
5	5	"Fruit of the Womb"	Samir Rehem	Kurt Smeaton	March 24, 2017
6	6	"Vince's Uncle"	Samir Rehem	Brandy Hewitt	March 24, 2017
7	7	"Sal Is Out"	Samir Rehem	Andrew De Angelis, Kurt Smeaton	March 24, 2017
8	8	"A King Is Born"	Samir Rehem	Andrew De Angelis	March 24, 2017
