= Bjanka Murgel =

Canadian actress and model (born 1983)

- Born: Bjanka Justin Murgel; 1983 (age 42–43); Toronto. Ontario, Canada
- Occupations: Actress, model

Bjanka Murgel is a Canadian actress and model. She has had several different television and film roles, including that of Mylene on the television series Lost Girls, and in a recurring role as Karina on The Latest Buzz. Murgel also appeared in Punisher: War Zone and starred as Kimberly in the movie Hidden 3D.
