= Bad Blood (TV series) =

Canadian crime drama television series

- Genre: Crime drama
- Created by: Simon Barry
- Based on: Business or Blood: Mafia Boss Vito Rizzuto's Last War by Antonio Nicaso and Peter Edwards (first season)
- Starring: Anthony LaPaglia; Kim Coates; Paul Sorvino; Enrico Colantoni; Brett Donahue; Maxim Roy; Tony Nappo; Michelle Mylett; Ryan McDonald; Sharon Taylor; Anna Hopkins; Gianni Falcone; Louis Ferreira; Daniel Kash; Franco Lo Presti; Dylan Taylor; Melanie Scrofano; Lisa Berry
- Country of origin: Canada
- Original language: English
- No. of seasons: 2
- No. of episodes: 14

Production
- Executive producers: Simon Barry; Michael Konyves; Mark Montefiore; Patrick O'Sullivan; Virginia Rankin; Josée Vallée
- Production locations: Montreal; Sudbury
- Cinematography: Michel St-Martin (6 episodes); Dylan Macleod (8 episodes)
- Editors: Éric Drouin (6 episodes); Arthur Tarnowski (4 episodes; Simon Webb (4 episodes)
- Running time: 44–45 minutes
- Production companies: New Metric Media; Sphere Media

Original release
- Network: Citytv
- Release: September 21, 2017 – November 29, 2018

Bad Blood is a Canadian crime drama television series created and produced by Simon Barry. The show premiered on Citytv on September 21, 2017. The series ran for two seasons totaling 14 episodes until November 29, 2018. A French-language version of the show premiered on November 11, 2017 on Ici Radio-Canada Télé under the title Les liens du sang. Initially intended as a miniseries, it was renewed by Rogers Media for a second season in March 2018, which was broadcast on Citytv and FX Canada. The first season is a dramatization of the rise and fall of the real-life Rizzuto crime family, a Montreal-based organized crime family, and is based on the 2015 book Business or Blood: Mafia Boss Vito Rizzuto's Last War by Antonio Nicaso and Peter Edwards. The second season departs from the book and is fully fictional.

The Rizzuto crime family consists of crime boss Vito Rizzuto (Anthony LaPaglia), high-ranking member Declan Gardiner (Kim Coates), consigliere Bruno Bonsignori (Enrico Colantoni), and associate Gio (Tony Nappo). The first season also features Vito's father Nicolo Rizzuto (Paul Sorvino), the patriarch of the family, along with Vito's son Nico (Brett Donahue), who hopes to take over as boss. The second season introduces Domenic Cosoleto (Louis Ferreira) and Enzo Cosoleto (Daniel Kash) of the Cosoleto crime family in Hamilton, and Teresa Langana (Anna Hopkins) and Christian Langana (Gianni Falcone), children of a mob boss in Italy who wants to expand their territory.

Bad Blood was filmed in Montreal, Quebec, and Sudbury, Ontario. The first season was largely set in Montreal, with the second season also including Hamilton, Ontario. The narrative is structured chronologically from the early 2000s, in a real-time fashion, also relying on flashbacks to fill in gaps from the past.

The series was critically acclaimed by critics at the Toronto Star and The Globe and Mail, and was nominated for Best Dramatic Series at the Canadian Screen Awards. For his leading performance, Coates won the Best Actor in a Continuing Leading Dramatic Role at the Canadian Screen Awards, while Konyves won the Best Writing, Drama Series.

== Premise ==
Set in Montreal between the early 2000s and early 2010s, Vito Rizzuto, the boss of the real-life Rizzuto crime family, seeks to bring peace to the criminal world in the city. However, when Vito is implicated and arrested for multiple murders committed in 1981, he puts his right-hand man, Declan Gardiner, in charge, and his empire begins to crumble. Upon Vito's release, he sets out on a path of revenge. Declan eventually finds himself at odds with new rivals, twins of a head mobster from Calabria, Italy, Teresa and Christian Langana, who are related to the Cosoleto brothers in Hamilton.

== Cast and characters ==
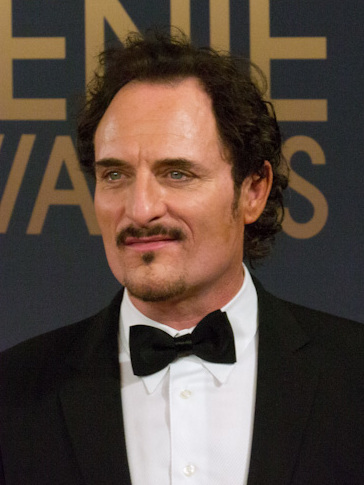
Kim Coates stars as Declan Gardiner

=== Main ===
- Anthony LaPaglia as Vito Rizzuto (season 1): boss of Montreal's Rizzuto crime family
- Kim Coates as Declan Gardiner: acting boss of the Rizzuto family when Vito goes to prison, and later the preeminent crime figure in Montreal when he overtakes Vito
- Paul Sorvino as Nicolo Rizzuto (season 1): patriarch and founder of the Rizzuto family
- Enrico Colantoni as Bruno Bonsignori (season 1): Rizzuto family consigliere
- Brett Donahue as Nico Jr. (season 1): Vito's oldest son
- Maxim Roy as Michelle (season 1): Vito's confidante
- Tony Nappo as Gio (season 1): soldier of the Rizzuto family
- Michelle Mylett as Sophie (season 1): Vito's mistress
- Ryan McDonald as Reggie Ross (season 2): Declan's nephew recently released from prison
- Sharon Taylor as Rose Sunwind (season 2): head of the Sunwind family that operates cigarette smuggling across the border through their Indian reserve, who partners with Declan in his drug smuggling operation
- Anna Hopkins as Teresa Langana (season 2): Christian Langana's twin sister, and daughter of a 'Ndrangheta mob boss in Italy looking to expand their Canadian territory from Hamilton into Montreal
- Gianni Falcone as Christian Langana (season 2): Teresa Langana's twin brother
- Louis Ferreira as Domenic Cosoleto (season 2): one of the Cosoleto brothers, a 'Ndrangheta branch in Hamilton
- Daniel Kash as Lorenzo "Enzo" Cosoleto (season 2): one of the Cosoleto brothers
- Franco Lo Presti as Luca Cosoleto (season 2): Domenic Cosoleto's son
- Dylan Taylor as Ignazio "Nats" Cosoleto (season 2): Enzo Cosoleto's son
- Melanie Scrofano as Valentina Cosoleto (season 2): Nats' wife who turns informant
- Lisa Berry as Nellie Bullock (season 2): an RCMP officer in the organized crime division who has been tracking the Cosoletos for years

=== Recurring ===
- Joris Jarsky as Sal Montagna (season 1): competing gang member and acting boss of New York City's Bonanno crime family
- Angela Asher as Renata: Vito's lawyer, and later Enzo's lawyer
- Vincent Leclerc as Jacques Pilote (season 1): biker gang boss
- Clauter Alexandre as Papa Lou (season 1): Haitian gang boss
- Claudia Ferri as France Charbonneau (season 1): Quebec Superior Court Justice in charge of fighting the corruption within the Rizzuto family
- Simu Liu as Guy (season 1): France's colleague
- Amber Goldfarb as Rachel (season 1): France's colleague
- Andrea Senior as Jeanne (season 1): France's secretary
- Romano Orzari as Toto Bianchi (season 1): a partner of Sal's
- Frank Schorpion as Inspector Aucoin (season 1): crooked RCMP inspector
- Ryan Blakely as Marc Desjardins (season 1): Rizzuto contact with Montreal's snow removal contracts
- Valerie Buhagiar as Loredana (season 1)
- Nicholas Campbell as Lonnie Gardiner (season 1): Declan's drug addicted father
- Joel Gagne as Luke (season 1): prison inmate
- Moe Jeudy-Lamour as Marlon (season 1): prison inmate
- Eric Hicks as Ken Tucker (season 2): Nellie Bullock's assistant officer who is working with Declan
- Oluwole Daramola as Siro (season 2): Teresa and Christian Langana's bodyguard
- Pedro Miguel Arce as Jorge Ramirez (season 2): Mexican cartel boss
- Ajuawak Kapashesit as Twix Sunwind (season 2): Rose's brother, member of the Sunwind family
- Brandon Oakes as Bobby Sunwind (season 2): Rose's brother, incarcerated member of the Sunwind family
- David La Haye as Alex (season 2): biker gang boss
- Lisa Codrington as Shelley (season 2): Declan's surveiller

== Episodes ==
Season	Episodes	Originally released	
Season	Episodes	First released	Last released
1	6	September 21, 2017	October 26, 2017
2	8	October 11, 2018	November 29, 2018

=== Season 1 (2017) ===
No. overall	No. in season	Title	Directed by	Written by	Original release date	Canada viewers (millions)
1	1	"Scar Tissue"	Alain DesRochers	Simon Barry	September 21, 2017	0.274
In the early 2000s, Vito Rizzuto is the boss of the Rizzuto crime family and is at the peak of his influence and power, while he keeps City Hall and the police in his pocket, and maintains peace with the bikers, the Irish, the Haitians and other Montreal gangs despite a botched hit on Vito which his right-hand man Declan Gardiner "takes care of." Vito is later arrested in Montreal on an extradition order from the United States for being one of four gunmen in the 1981 triple killings of capos Philip Giaccone, Dominick Trinchera and Alphonse Indelicato in Brooklyn, New York after his name was given up in a testimony. In a flashback, the triple murder is carried out. In the present, Vito is taken to a supermax prison in Colorado, and his operations between the Montreal gangs begin to deteriorate. At the Rizzuto home, Vito's father Nicolo Rizzuto, Declan, and associates have a meeting to decide the acting boss for the family while Vito is imprisoned. Vito's son, Nico Jr. expresses his desire to assume his father's role, much to the objection of the family.
2	2	"Pacifier"	Alain DesRochers	Simon Barry; Michael Konyves	September 28, 2017	0.216
With Vito in prison, Declan is left in charge, however Nico proclaims himself boss of the family. Nico sets off a bloody chain of reactions between Montreal gangs when he orders the killings of two men for not taking his authority seriously. Meanwhile, Declan meets with Vito in prison, where Vito makes it clear his main priority is the safety of his son and the family. At the Rizzuto home, Declan becomes furious with Nico for not consulting the family before his actions. Nico reinforces that a Rizzuto is the one who will call the shots. In multiple flashbacks to the mid 1990s, Declan is seen as a loyal right-hand man to Vito, where he handles situations with composure. In the present, Declan takes matters into his own hands, and closes the condominium deal that Nico had previously taken off the table in order to smooth things over quickly. Back at the Rizzuto home, Nico ridicules Declan for "bending over for everyone," storms out, and drives off without his bodyguards. Declan drives after him, but he is too far behind to act when a car pulls up beside Nico's car at a red light and shoots him multiple times. Nico is brought to a hospital where he recovers. Declan meets with Vito in prison once again, where Vito reminds him the importance of his son and the family.
3	3	"Feast or Famine"	Alain DesRochers	Simon Barry	October 5, 2017	N/A
The family sits down with Nico and Declan; Nico agrees to go back to his regular life in real estate. In a flashback eight years earlier, Declan meets with bikers, and loads drugs into a van. When police arrive and arrest Declan, he is given a 15-year sentence in prison and vows not to become an informant. With Vito's help, Declan was released after serving just four years of his sentence, after which, he becomes a made man despite not being of Italian descent. In the present, operations run smoothly for about a year until allied Montreal gangs shed blood over turf, which Declan diffuses. Vito concocts a plan for an early release involving the prison doctor; Declan tells Nico to act as a concerned son when he contacts Vito, in that he recommends his father see the doctor after hearing "bad coughs." Gio, a Rizzuto soldier, meets with the doctor, and after showing him photos of his family, implying their potential harm, Vito's medical records are forged to indicate that he has cancer. With Vito's release imminent, the family celebrates the boss' return. Meanwhile, Quebec Superior Court Justice France Charbonneau launches a Commission into the corruption of Montreal's construction industry, one of the many means of income for the Rizzuto family. Although Nico had become less involved in the family's business, he is gunned down while walking his dog in late 2009. The family, devastated by the news, discuss probable killers. Vito receives word in prison, where a warden informs him that he will not be allowed to go back to Montreal for the funeral, which devastates him.
4	4	"Home is Where the Gun is"	Alain DesRochers	Simon Barry; Michael Konyves	October 12, 2017	N/A
After the family is finished burying Nico Jr., Nicolo Rizzuto is shot dead by a sniper, shot through the glass of his home while tending to his tomato plants. The family discuses that the attacks were likely from the Bonanno crime family's acting boss, Sal Montagna in attempts to take over the Montreal underworld while the Rizzutos are in a power struggle. After serving over five years of his 10-year sentence, Vito is released in late 2012, and comes back to an organization that is under attack. As Declan prepares to pick up Vito at the airport, Bruno, Rizzuto consigliere, informs him that Vito had requested that he not be there. Vito is transported to a discrete location in a hotel, where he lays low for months, which makes the allied gangs restless. While Declan spends time at his cottage in the Eastern Townships, Bruno meets with him, where they come under attack by a sniper, but escape. Declan meets with Vito at his hotel room, where the two make amends despite Vito acknowledging that he let him down. Meanwhile, Charbonneau and her team make progress in their investigation when a man agrees to testify. Bruno and Declan meet with Vito at his hotel room where Bruno advises Vito to meet with the allied gang members, because if they revolt and have to go to war, they could lose. Soon after, Vito makes his first public appearance at a restaurant to celebrate Bruno's birthday. After the party, Vito questions Bruno's motives for personal interest. Bruno pleads his loyalty for Vito, but Vito smashes his head with an ashtray, knocking him to the ground. Vito tells Gio to finish him off; Gio shoots Bruno dead.
5	5	"When You Got Nothin'..."	Alain DesRochers	Simon Barry; Michael Konyves	October 19, 2017	N/A
At the Quebec–Vermont border, Sal's men ambush a Rizzuto drop point. With Vito's approval, Declan and Gio raise Montreal's homicide rate 250 percent, killing anyone who crossed the Rizzutos. Charbonneau's team attempt to obtain wiretaps of an RCMP task force into organized crime from 2006 that may overlap with her investigation. Vito's inside man with the RCMP tells Vito that Charbonneau is asking for the 2006 wiretaps, but that he will deny them access based on the wiretaps being federal jurisdiction, while Charbonneau's Commission is provincial. When Sal's men continue to hijack the Rizzutos' drop points, Declan and Vito agree to only give drop point information to Gio. Gio and three men drive to a drop point, but as they drive down an isolated road at night, the van is seized by rivals. They open the back doors of the van to take the goods, but Gio and Declan, who are hiding in the back of the van, shoot them dead. Declan, believing that the three men had given up the drop point, shoots them dead. Suspecting Gio also played a part, Declan shoots him and leaves him for dead. After Declan shares the news with Vito, they meet with the RCMP inspector where he tells Vito that he has been diagnosed with liver cancer and that he would be retiring—meaning his partnership with Vito would end. Declan tells Vito that they could pursue more legitimate sources of revenue and start a new legacy, but Vito states his legacy is over. On their drive home, Declan reveals that he grew up without a mother, and a father who gave up his children due to a drug addiction. Declan later meets with Sal; he asks Declan if he is ready to be a king, to which he replies, "absolutely."
6	6	"You Can Never Hold Back Spring"	Alain DesRochers	Simon Barry; Michael Konyves	October 26, 2017	N/A
Sal and a bodyguard meet with Declan at his cottage, where Declan unsuspectingly kills his bodyguard. While Sal attempts to escape, Declan shoots him dead. Meanwhile, Charbonneau and her team uncover irregular patterns in the city's snow removal contracts, and call in snow removal contact Marc Desjardins for questioning. Jeanne, Charbonneau's secretary, notifies Declan of her plans; he tells Desjardins to agree to the allegations and to implicate Sal Montagna. Soon after, Charbonneau hears of Sal's death and suspects Desjardins information was fed. Declan tracks down his father, Lonnie, at his trailer in Cornwall, Ontario, who is still a drug addict on welfare. Declan tells him that he has ordered anyone who gives him drugs be killed as revenge for the suffering he caused him when he gave up his children. Vito is notified by the RCMP inspector that six bodies were found by a roadside, one of which was still alive in hospital. Vito meets Declan at his apartment and tells him Gio survived and that he told him that he was not the one who was giving up the drop points. Suspecting Declan, Vito confronts him, and Declan tells him the truth. Declan explains that when Nico was killed, he was shunned despite his continual loyalty and decided it was time to switch allegiance reaching out to Sal. Disgusted, Vito returns to his home where he drinks a special bottle of wine he had been saving to have with his son on his birthday, and collapses. In flashbacks, Declan concocts a plan with Sal that included staging an attack against him and Bruno, giving up the drop points, and poisoning the bottle of wine. A montage of live footage is shown of Vito's funeral with text stating Vito's death was officially attributed to natural causes on December 23, 2013, however there is speculation that he may have been poisoned as an autopsy was never performed on his body. Six months later, Declan is at his cottage doing business with the bikers as a bullet shatters the glass missing him but he seems unfazed.

=== Season 2 (2018) ===
No. overall	No. in season	Title	Directed by	Written by	Original release date	Canada viewers (millions)
7	1	"Who are You?"	Jeff Renfroe	Michael Konyves	October 11, 2018	N/A
With the gangs in Montreal vying to become boss following Vito's death, Declan kills the leaders of the Haitian, Irish and biker crews, including Toto Bianchi. Declan travels to Oaxaca, Mexico, and partners with cartel boss Jorge Ramirez. They agree to a deal that supplies Declan with 100 kilos of cocaine from the cartel worth $5 million per week to the Montreal ports. Meanwhile, in Hamilton, RCMP officer Nellie Bullock, and her assistant Ken Tucker, surveil the Cosoleto family at their Italian social club where they meet with Teresa and Christian Langana, cousins from Calabria, Italy. They inform the Cosoletos that their father Vincenzo, the 'Ndrangheta boss in Italy, tasked them with expanding their drug business from Hamilton into Montreal. The Cosoletos, consisting of Domenic, the boss, his son Luca, Domenic's brother Enzo, and his son Nats, express hesitance due to Montreal being Declan's territory, but the Langanas insist. Reggie, Declan's nephew, is released from prison after eight years, and moves in with Declan. Unbeknownst to the Cosoletos, Nats' wife, Valentina, is a confidential informant for Nellie because she uses a recording of her committing adultery as blackmail. Rose Sunwind, the head of an Indian reserve while her brother Bobby is in prison, partners with Declan in moving his drugs across the border through the reserve. Domenic arranges a meeting for the Langanas with Declan where they propose a partnership, but that he would have to answer to them; Declan refuses to work for "anyone." When the cocaine arrives at the port, the Langanas steal it before Declan retrieves the shipment. Teresa calls Declan to tell him that they have the shipment and that their offer will expire within 24 hours, but for each hour he waits, their terms will change.
8	2	"A Grapefruit Worth 20 Million"	Jeff Renfroe	Michael Konyves	October 18, 2018	N/A
Christian and Siro, the Langanas' bodyguard, shoot up Declan's house, but before they ultimately blow up the house, Declan and Reggie escape through an escape hatch hidden beneath the floorboards. Assuming Declan is dead, the Langanas inform the Cosoletos that they will start cutting their cocaine with fentanyl to increase the potency and decrease their costs. Enzo is opposed to it, however Domenic agrees. Declan visits Domenic unexpectedly at his house and questions his authority over the Langanas, but Domenic backs them as the children of the head boss in Italy. With no product to supply Declan's partners, they all turn to the Langanas except for the head biker, Alex, who sets up a meeting with the Langanas, but gives Declan the location. Declan and two men wait with snipers at the location, but when the Langanas are not present, they kill their men except for one, including one of the bikers who Declan finds out is an informant. With Declan's house destroyed, he stays on Rose's reserve for an increased percentage in their deal, after he brought Reggie to a hotel. A cartel member finds Declan at the reserve and says that they know about the Langanas, but that their agreement still stands—that they will not accept late payment. While Reggie walks back from meeting his parole officer, he is kidnapped by Siro.
9	3	"Una Vita Per Una Vita"	Jeff Renfroe	Patrick Moss	October 25, 2018	N/A
Reggie is being held captive by the Langanas. They send Declan a photo of a bloodied Reggie and tell him to meet them in three hours if he wants Reggie to live. Instead, Declan resorts to kidnapping Nats' infant son from his home after he punches Nats unconscious. Later, a furious Nats confronts the Langanas, wanting to return Reggie so that he can get his son back. The Langanas do not want to give in to Declan's terms which are $5 million and Reggie back, but later finally reach an agreement to exchange captives. Once Nats arrives, Reggie and the money are exchanged for Nats' son. As Declan drives off, Nats shoots at his car, instead hitting and killing a passing motorist. Nats is arrested and charged with second degree murder.
10	4	"This Ship Has Sailed"	Jeff Renfroe	Alison Lea Bingeman	November 1, 2018	N/A
Declan takes Reggie with him to the port where he is to leave the money for the cartel in a shipping container bound for Mexico. Valentina meets with Nellie where she hopes something could be done in order for Nats' release, but when Nellie offers no help, Valentina declares to cut ties with her. Nellie gets the approval to place a bug in the visitation room at the Millhaven Institution in Bath, Ontario, where Nats is incarcerated and protected by Bobby Sunwind. Valentina visits Nats in prison where she confesses her infidelity as well as her involvement with the RCMP. Nats furiously asks her what she had told them, and she says she told them about the Langanas and the family's new dealings in fentanyl. An enraged Nats forcefully grabs her neck telling her to keep her mouth shut as he is pulled away by guards. Meanwhile, when police unexpectedly arrive at the port for a random search, Declan and Reggie hide, but the pair of officers discover the money. One officer wants to take the money for himself, while the other leaves as he does not want to take any part. Declan finally emerges with his gun drawn, and the officer reciprocates. Reggie then jumps out from behind him and clubs him in the head, killing the officer. The cartel member meets with Declan to inform him that their further deals are suspended due to the instability as a result of his current war with the Langanas.
11	5	"Disruption and Early Sorrow"	Molly McGlynn	Alison Lea Bingeman	November 8, 2018	N/A
With the port's security tightened and the Mexican cartel partnership ceased, Declan uses old sources to smuggle in product from New York which is distributed through the Sunwind reserve. Rose's nephew is found dead on the reserve from a cocaine overdose laced with fentanyl. This prompts Rose to shut down the operations through the reserve for the time being. Headlines of several fentanyl overdoses prompts Domenic to tell the Langanas that their use of fentanyl in their product is over, but Luca still deals it for them behind his back. Enzo visits Nats in prison where Nats makes him swear he will protect Valentina and his son no matter what, but does not tell him about Valentina's collusion with police. Rose and Declan track down her nephew's dealer in Châteauguay, and force him to give the name of his supplier, who is a woman from Hamilton who operates out of a massage parlour. Nellie visits Enzo at his house where she plays a recording of Valentina confessing her collusion with police, and offers him protection for information, but he throws them out. Shelley, Declan's surveillor, finds the production house of the Cosoletos, a church, and calls in an anonymous tip to the organized crime division. The RCMP start an investigation of the church and find a lighter belonging to Teresa. Enzo furiously confronts Valentina about the recording, but tells her he made a promise to his son that he would protect her and his grandson and would not tell Domenic. Ken, working with Declan, meets with him where he informs Declan about Valentina. He sends a package of the recording to Domenic, and when he plays it, discovers the truth about Valentina.
12	6	"What to do About Valentina"	Molly McGlynn	Patrick Moss	November 15, 2018	N/A
Domenic plays Enzo and Luca the prison recording he received of Valentina. Declan resumes running drug shipments through the reserve. Twix Sunwind, Rose's brother, surreptitiously adulterates Declan’s cocaine with baby powder. Declan supplies the bikers with cocaine, claiming 90 percent purity, but the bikers later find the purity is much lower. Consequently, Alex phones the Langanas, agreeing to a partnership in exchange for his killing Declan. During Valentina's son's first birthday party, Enzo, Domenic and Luca discuss their Valentina problem. Domenic knows she must be killed to prevent her further informing or their Italian bosses murdering the Cosoletos to protect themselves. Enzo is adamant she must live as he promised Nats and does not want to leave his grandson parentless. Domenic appears to concede. Meanwhile, Shelley has tailed the Langanas from the party back to a condo building in Toronto. Declan visits Bobby in prison and eventually persuades him to stop protecting Nats. This is partly a plan against the Cosoletos, partly revenge for the murder of Bobby’s son. After the party, Domenic regretfully strangles Valentina in her sleep. Devastated, Enzo punches Domenic in the face. Later, Domenic and Luca bury the body; Enzo calls in a missing persons report.
13	7	"Lupara Cosoleto"	Jeff Renfroe	Michael Konyves	November 22, 2018	N/A
Declan orders Bobby to give Nats a severe beating in prison and shows Enzo a photo of the results, threatening further beatings unless Enzo informs on his family. Enzo caves in. At the RCMP office, he tells Nellie he will talk only after his son is transferred to a minimum-security prison. Domenic visits the Langanas to report on Enzo; enraged, Christian shoots him dead. Teresa orders Alex to find out if Declan has any connection with Bobby. The RCMP match fingerprints from Italy to Teresa's fingerprints on her mislaid lighter. Nellie receives an anonymous note giving the address of the Toronto condo. She raids the building but the Laganas elude the RCMP team through a maze of rooms. They drive away, tailed by Declan and the Sunwinds, who had lain in wait for the raid. A shootout ensues. Declan shoots Christian dead after Christian wounds Rose. Hysterical, Teresa cradles her brother, but is dragged away by Siro; the two escape. Back at the reserve, Declan bandages Rose's flesh wound, and they have sex. As Teresa and Siro are about to leave Toronto by helicopter, Alex notifies her that he has located the reserve. Teresa delays her departure to hunt Declan.
14	8	"Declan's Choice"	Jeff Renfroe	Michael Konyves	November 29, 2018	N/A
Ordered by Teresa, the bikers kill Enzo and his bodyguard at a motel; a biker prison inmate kills Nats. Declan discovers the cocaine that Twix was skimming from shipments to the bikers. He realises that the loss of purity is what caused the bikers to side with Teresa against him. At the prison, Ken Tucker interrogates Bobby, learning that the bikers killed Nats. Ken covertly informs Declan. The bikers ambush Reggie, Rose and Declan at the reserve. Teresa gives Declan the choice of having her kill either Rose or Reggie. When Declan is unable to choose, Reggie volunteers and she kills him. Declan collapses in anguish and is perfunctorily shot once by Teresa as she leaves to board a helicopter. Twix arrives and kills biker boss Alex to prevent him murdering Rose, but is himself killed moments later. Declan, seriously wounded, manages to kill Siro and Teresa. When the police arrive, Rose tells them that her brother was stealing from the bikers, and that Declan had nothing to do with the shootout. Meanwhile, with all of Nellie's leads dead, the RCMP shuts down the organized crime division. Declan buries Reggie in the plot beside his mother, originally intended for himself.

== Production ==
=== Development ===
Production company, New Metric Media approached show creator, Simon Barry, with the idea that a story about the Rizzuto crime family was meant for the screen. New Metric Media had purchased the rights to the acclaimed book, Business or Blood: Mafia Boss Vito Rizzuto's Last War, by mob journalists Antonio Nicaso and Peter Edwards, who had covered the trials and investigations into Montreal's extensive mob violence and activity. Barry teamed up with Michael Konyves to make the six-part miniseries, someone who also immediately recognized the incredible possibilities of the concept presented citing that the book provided a crucial roadmap to the first season. Barry scripted the pilot and then handed the reins over to Konyves, who served as showrunner on both seasons.

"Bad Blood needed to be done, and it needed to be done in Canada by Canadians — and I'm really glad they [Rogers and Citytv] took the chance."

— Simon Berry

Barry met with the book's authors early on and listened to the various anecdotes to get a greater idea of who these characters were—with omissions made in many cases for legal reasons. Konyves cited making changes to some scripts the day before production for legal reasons. Since Vito spends an extended period in an American prison and out of the action, Barry and Konyves exchanged ideas about from whose perspective the story would be told; their solution was to create a fictional character, Declan Gardiner (Kim Coates), who was placed high up in the Rizzuto clan, but was not actually a blood relation, and who would become a composite of several real-world characters. Declan is brought into the family by Vito similar to Robert Duvall's character Tom Hagen from The Godfather.

The series was renewed for a second season by Rogers Media in March 2018, with Nataline Rodrigues, Director of Original Programming at Rogers Media saying, "The calibre of talent both in front of and behind the camera, in addition to the overwhelming viewer response, made the decision to renew Bad Blood for Season 2 an easy one." The second season departs from the book and is fully fictional, with Coates saying, "There are no more rules. This is our story now... I've gone completely lone wolf."

=== Casting ===
In January 2017, Rogers Media announced the starring cast for the six-part series, Anthony LaPaglia as Montreal crime boss Vito Rizzuto, Kim Coates as Vito's fictional right-hand man Declan Gardiner, Paul Sorvino as family patriarch Nicolo Rizzuto, and Enrico Colantoni as Bruno Bonsignori. Coates said, "It really was some of the greatest writing I had ever read." Sorvino had some initial reservations about the project, saying, "I'm a little wary about doing anything Mafia because, boy, I'm nailed down as a Mafioso." He was ultimately won over by the strong script and his role as Nicolo Rizzuto, patriarch of the crime family. LaPaglia had little knowledge of Rizzuto before taking the part, but immersed himself in the character by watching film and listening to wiretap evidence, saying, "His voice was twice as gravelly as mine, sometimes hard to understand." Additional cast included, Brett Donahue, Maxim Roy, Tony Nappo, Frank Schorpion, Joris Jarsky, Michelle Mylett, Clauter Alexandre and Vincent Leclerc.

In May 2018, after the series was renewed in March 2018, Rogers Media announced that Kim Coates was the only one to reprise his role alongside a new dynamic ensemble cast starring, Louis Ferreira as Domenic Cosoleto, Anna Hopkins as Teresa Langana, and Melanie Scrofano as Valentina Cosoleto. Additional cast included, Daniel Kash, Franco Lo Presti, Dylan Taylor, Lisa Berry, Gianni Falcone, Sharon Taylor and Ryan McDonald.

=== Filming ===
Filming of the series took place in Montreal, Quebec and Sudbury, Ontario. Sudbury was particularly chosen to take advantage of tax credits and financial incentives; care was taken to cloak locations during its initial shooting days. Konyves used a two-camera setup, saying, "I'll never do a show without two cameras again. You will get into a budget argument over the second camera, but it saves you so much time and headache in the editing room. If you've got six days instead of eight to do an hour-long episode, the second camera gives you that extra coverage."

== Broadcast and release ==
The first two seasons aired on Citytv in Canada on Thursdays at 8:00 pm. The second season was also broadcast on FX Canada on Sundays at 10:00 pm. In November 2018, Netflix announced that it would distribute the series internationally, with the first season released on December 7, 2018, and the second released on May 31, 2019. Both seasons left Netflix globally in June 2022.

== Reception ==
=== Critical reception ===
The first season of Bad Blood received mostly positive reviews from critics and has a score of 80% on Rotten Tomatoes based on five reviews with an average rating of 8/10.

The Toronto Star called the series a Canadian "Sopranos." John Doyle of The Globe and Mail praised the first season, calling it "very superior docu-drama: gripping, richly textured and unfussily focused not just on the violent dynamics of a successful mob operation but on what happens when a strong leader is absent and the centre of power disintegrates." Doyle also praised the second season, calling it "not only nifty entertainment, it’s a deftly made, superior crime drama, forensically smart about family and business power."

=== Viewership ===
The first season reached a total of 3.2 million Canadian viewers.

=== Awards and nominations ===
Year	Award	Category	Nominee(s)	Result	Ref.
2018	Canadian Screen Awards	Best Lead Actor, Television Film or Miniseries	Kim Coates	Nominated	
2018	Canadian Screen Awards	Best Lead Actress, Television Film or Miniseries	Maxim Roy	Nominated	
2018	Canadian Screen Awards	Best Writing, Dramatic Program or Miniseries	Michael Konyves	Nominated	
2019	Canadian Screen Awards	Best Dramatic Series	Bad Blood	Nominated	
2019	Canadian Screen Awards	Best Actor in a Continuing Leading Dramatic Role	Kim Coates	Won	
2019	Canadian Screen Awards	Best Supporting Actor, Drama	Louis Ferreira	Nominated	
2019	Canadian Screen Awards	Best Writing, Drama Series	Michael Konyves	Won	
