= State of Grace (TV series) =

2001 American comedy-drama television series

- Created by: Brenda Lilly; Hollis Rich
- Starring: Dinah Manoff; Michael Mantell; Alia Shawkat; Erica Yohn; Jason Blicker; Faye Grant; Mae Whitman
- Narrated by: Frances McDormand
- Opening theme: "Do You Believe in Magic" performed by Lovin' Spoonful
- Composers: Paul Gordon; Inon Zur; Shuki Levy; Kussa Mahchi
- Country of origin: United States
- Original language: English
- No. of seasons: 2
- No. of episodes: 38

Production
- Camera setup: Single-camera
- Running time: 22–24 minutes
- Production company: Stan Rogow Productions

Original release
- Network: Fox Family (season 1); ABC Family (season 2)
- Release: June 25, 2001 – December 4, 2002

State of Grace is an American comedy-drama series that ran for two seasons on Fox Family, later ABC Family during 2001 and 2002.

== Plot ==
The show is centered on two 12-year-old girls from very different backgrounds, Hannah and Grace, who are best friends. Hannah is from a middle class Jewish family and lives with her parents, her grandmother, and her uncle. Her parents are the owners of a furniture factory in the fictitious town of Ashmore, North Carolina, to where they have recently moved from Chicago. Grace is from a wealthy Catholic family and lives with her mother, a socialite. Typically, they are depicted as more intelligent, thoughtful, funny, and rebellious than other children of their age. Set in 1965, the show was compared by some to another look-back-through-the-years show, The Wonder Years. Fred Savage, the star of the hit ABC series, appeared in the series' final episode.

The theme song is the original version of "Do You Believe in Magic" by The Lovin' Spoonful. The show was taped at Ren-Mar Studios stage 4.

== Cast and characters ==
=== Main ===
- Dinah Manoff: Evelyn Rayburn, Hannah's mother
- Michael Mantell: David Rayburn, Hannah's father
- Alia Shawkat: 12-year-old Jewish-American girl Hannah Rayburn
- Erica Yohn: Grandma Ida, Hannah's grandmother
- Jason Blicker: Uncle Heschie, Hannah's uncle
- Faye Grant: Tattie McKee, Grace's mother
- Mae Whitman: 12-year-old Emma 'Grace' McKee, Hannah's best friend
- Frances McDormand: Narrator, voice of adult Hannah

=== Guest stars ===
- Bryan Neal: Walker Adams, Grace's older half-brother
- Bonnie Bailey-Reed: Shirley, the Rayburns' receptionist
- Carl M. Craig: Greer, the McKees' chauffeur
- Patricia Forte: Cookie, the McKees' maid
- Tom Verica: Tommy Austin, Tattie's fiancé
- Adrian Neil: Nigel Grenville III, Tattie's friend

=== Cast collaborations ===
The two main actresses, Shawkat and Whitman, went on to co-star on Fox's Arrested Development. Shawkat was in the main cast and Whitman was a recurring guest star in season two and the beginning of season three 2004–2005. Shawkat played Maeby Funke on the show, while Whitman played Ann Veal, the girlfriend of Maeby's cousin George Michael Bluth who was portrayed by Michael Cera. Shawkat, Manoff and Mantell would later have roles in the film Bart Got a Room.

== Episodes ==
=== Season 1 (2001) ===
No. overall	No. in season	Title	Directed by	Written by	Original release date
1	1	"Love, Love Me Do"	Melanie Mayron	Brenda Lilly & Hollis Rich	June 25, 2001
2	2	"Homeward Bound"	Melanie Mayron	Brenda Lilly & Hollis Rich	June 25, 2001
3	3	"Perfect Day"	Sheldon Larry	Mike Martineau	July 2, 2001
4	4	"We Gotta Get Outta This Place"	Melanie Mayron	Brenda Lilly & Hollis Rich	July 2, 2001
5	5	"Time in a Bottle"	Dennis Erdman	Mike Martineau	July 9, 2001
6	6	"Crime and Self-Punishment"	Sheldon Larry	Steven Peterman & Gary Dontzig	July 9, 2001
7	7	"Eve of Discussion"	Unknown	Unknown	July 16, 2001
8	8	"The Force of Fun"	Melanie Mayron	Hollis Rich & Brenda Lilly	July 16, 2001
9	9	"Book by Its Cover"	Dennis Erdman	Steven Peterman & Gary Dontzig	July 30, 2001
10	10	"Saving Grace"	Sheldon Larry	Marcy Vosburgh	August 6, 2001
11	11	"Looking for God in All the Right Places"	Sheldon Larry	Steven Peterman & Gary Dontzig	August 13, 2001
12	12	"Happy Together (a.k.a. The Tango Affair)"	Sheldon Larry	Sy Rosen	August 20, 2001
13	13	"This Diamond Ring"	Ellen Gittelsohn	Hollis Rich & Brenda Lilly	August 27, 2001

=== Season 2 (2002) ===
No. overall	No. in season	Title	Directed by	Written by	Original release date
14	1	"Get Me to the Church on Time"	Sheldon Larry	Brenda Lilly & Hollis Rich	March 1, 2002
15	2	"Of Diamonds and Deli Meats"	Mark Rosman	Steven Peterman & Gary Dontzig	March 8, 2002
16	3	"For the Birds"	Sheldon Larry	Lisa Albert	March 15, 2002
17	4	"All That Jazz"	Linda Day	Elaine Aronson	March 22, 2002
18	5	"It's a Wonderful Heschie"	Victoria Hochberg	Ed Simpson	March 22, 2002
19	6	"All Kinds of Heroes"	Sheldon Larry	Marcy Vosburgh	March 29, 2002
20	7	"The Expanding Universe"	Melanie Mayron	Lisa Albert	March 29, 2002
21	8	"Fortunate Son"	Sheldon Larry	Steven Peterman & Gary Dontzig	April 5, 2002
22	9	"Hello Goodbye"	Unknown	Unknown	April 12, 2002
23	10	"The Name Game"	Jim Kramer	Steven Peterson & Gary Dontzig	April 19, 2002
24	11	"The Way We Weren't"	Victoria Hochberg	Jeanette Collins & Mimi Friedman	April 26, 2002
25	12	"Take Good Care of My Baby"	Sheldon Larry	Story by : Ed Simpson; Teleplay by : Lisa Albert	May 3, 2002
26	13	"Where the Boys Are"	Sheldon Larry	Story by : Steven Peterman & Gary Dontzig and Lisa Albert; Teleplay by : Hollis Rich & Brenda Lilly	May 10, 2002
27	14	"Smoke, Mirrors and Chicken Fat"	Sheldon Larry	Steven Peterman & Gary Dontzig	June 3, 2002
28	15	"Scandalous Behavior"	Unknown	Unknown	June 3, 2002
29	16	"Dating Games"	Sheldon Larry	Brenda Lilly & Hollis Rich	June 10, 2002
30	17	"Driving Miss Ida"	Sheldon Larry	Tom Seeley	June 17, 2002
31	18	"Spy Games"	Sheldon Larry	Tom Seeley	June 24, 2002
32	19	"Monkey Business"	Jim Kramer	Steven Peterman & Gary Dontzig	July 8, 2002
33	20	"To Be Young at Heart"	Sheldon Larry	Steven Peterman & Gary Dontzig	July 15, 2002
34	21	"Sophisticated Ladies"	Sheldon Larry	James Kramer	July 22, 2002
35	22	"A Taste of Money"	Mark Rosman	James Kramer	July 29, 2002
36	23	"Great Wall of Rayburn"	Victoria Hochberg	Lisa Albert	August 5, 2002
37	24	"Someone to Watch Over You"	Victoria Hochberg	Lisa Albert	August 19, 2002
38	25	"Legacy"	Victoria Hochberg	Tom Seeley	August 19, 2002
Special	Special	"Holiday on Ice"	Sheldon Larry	Story by : Brenda Lilly & Hollis Rich; Teleplay by : Hollis Rich & Brenda Lilly and Steven Peterman & Gary Dontzig	December 4, 2002

== Awards and nominations ==
The series was created by Brenda Lilly and Hollis Rich and was recipient of many awards including The Parents Television Council, the Humanitas Award, and a Jewish Image Award. Shawkat and Whitman were both nominated for the Young Artist Award for the Best Performance in a TV Comedy Series – Leading Young Actress in 2002.
