= Hidden 3D =

- Theater released poster
- Directed by: Antoine Thomas
- Screenplay by: "Alan Smithee" "Alana Smithy"
- Story by: Mariano Baino; Coralina Cataldi-Tassoni
- Produced by: Don Carmody; Valérie d'Auteuil; Andrea Marotti; André Rouleau; Alessandro Verdecchi
- Starring: Devon Bostick; Jason Blicker; Sean Clement; Bjanka Murgel; Simonetta Solder; Dawn Ford
- Cinematography: Benoit Beaulieu
- Edited by: Yvann Thibaudeau
- Release date: April 21, 2011
- Running time: 88 minutes
- Countries: Italy; Canada
- Language: English
- Budget: $8 million (estimated)
- Box office: $16,890,678

Hidden 3D is an Italian-Canadian horror film directed by Antoine Thomas and produced by Caramel Films. It was filmed in Italy and Canada over the Summer and Fall of 2010. Hidden 3D was filmed in both 2D and 3D Technologies.

== Plot ==
When his mother dies, Brian Carter is surprised to learn that he has inherited The Sanctuary, home to her controversial experimental addiction treatment center. Having previously believed that the building burned to the ground years ago, Brian travels there with a group of friends and meets Haley, a mysterious friend of his mother, who acts as their guide through the impressive, monastery-like building. During their tour it becomes clear that something sinister lies beneath the surface.

Despite their misgivings, they follow a secret passageway underground and come across strange and unsettling discoveries that trigger Brian's disturbing memories of his mother's research. Ultimately, they are confronted by her terrible secret: Brian's mother built a revolutionary machine that cured people of their addictions but, as a side effect, those addictions materialized in the form of mutant children hungry for human flesh.

Sharing the dark bowels of the building with swarms of firefly-like creatures that they use to lure their victims into death traps, the mutant children begin a wild hunt, with the new visitors as their prey. Fighting to stay alive against the inconceivable, Brian and his friends soon realize that some things are better left hidden.

== Cast ==
- Devon Bostick as Lucas
- Jason Blicker as Simon
- Sean Clement as Brian Carter
- Bjanka Murgel as Kimberly
- Simonetta Solder as Haley Gable
- Jordan Hayes as Vicky
- Dawn Ford as Dr Susan Carter
- Elliott Larson as Haley's Son
- Cristina Rosato as Newsreporter
- Allan Kolman as Chester

== Release ==
The film was released on DVD 12 December 2011.

== Reception ==
Reviews were largely negative.
