= Lisa Codrington =

Canadian actress and playwright

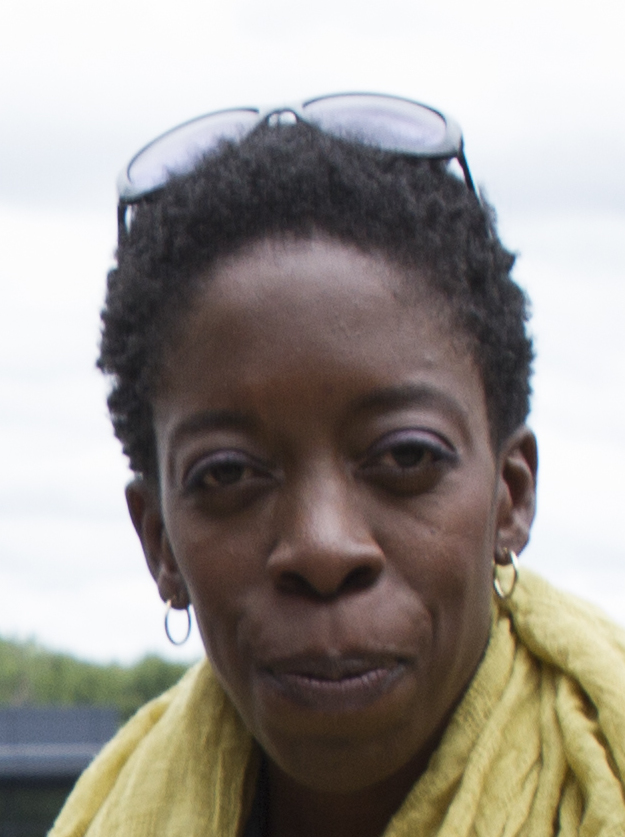
- Codrington in September 2018
- Occupations: Actress, playwright

Lisa Codrington is a Canadian character actress and playwright. She is most noted for her role as Gail on the comedy series Letterkenny and her theatrical plays Cast Iron, which was a nominee for the Governor General's Award for English-language drama at the 2006 Governor General's Awards, and Up the Garden Path, which won the Carol Bolt Award in 2016.

== Early life and education ==
During early 2000s, she studied criminology and theatre at the University of Winnipeg and acting at the Ryerson Theatre School.

== Career ==
Codrington wrote Cast Iron as a one-woman show about her Barbados roots, and won a five-month workshop when she submitted a draft of the play to the Write from the Hop competition. The play premiered at Toronto's Tarragon Theatre in 2005, with Alison Sealy-Smith in the lead role. Her later plays have included The Aftermath (2011), The Adventures of the Black Girl in Her Search for God (2016) and Up the Garden Path.

As an actress, Codrington also played Shelley in the series Bad Blood and has had supporting roles in the television series Copper, Heroes Reborn, Man Seeking Woman, The Handmaid's Tale, Saving Hope, Alias Grace, Cardinal, What Would Sal Do?, Schitt's Creek, Anne with an E, Little Dog, Children Ruin Everything and American Hostage, and stage roles in productions of Da Kink in My Hair, A Midsummer Night's Dream and Binti's Journey.

== Filmography ==
=== Film ===
Year	Title	Role	Notes
2017	Flatliners	Chief Resident	
2018	22 Chaser	Connie	
2019	The Kindness of Strangers	Bonnie	
2019	Shazam!	Interviewee	

=== Television ===
Year	Title	Role	Notes
2013	Copper	Lydia Turnow	2 episodes
2015	Heroes Reborn	Miss Franklin	Episode: "Brave New World"
2016	Man Seeking Woman	Dr. Sheila Evans	Episode: "Feather"
2016	Orphan Black	Kendra Dupree	Episode: "The Mitigation of Competition"
2016, 2018	Schitt's Creek	Audrey	2 episodes
2016–2023	Letterkenny	Gail	41 episodes
2017	The Handmaid's Tale	Officer #2	Episode: "Birth Day"
2017	Baroness von Sketch Show	Andy	Episode: "Don't Call Me Ma'am"
2017	Saving Hope	Nurse Rosa	2 episodes
2017	Alias Grace	Carrie	Episode: "Part 5"
2018	Cardinal	Dr. Wasserstein	Episode: "Tool"
2018	Bad Blood	Shelley	6 episodes
2018–2019	Anne with an E	Constance	5 episodes
2019	Little Dog	Detective Dee	Episode: "Round Fifteen"
2022	Children Ruin Everything	Marla	7 episodes
2022	The Terminal List	Janice Martley	3 episodes
2022	The Lake	Naomi	6 episodes
2026	American Hostage	Judy	6 episodes
