= Back in Black (film) =

2026 Canadian comedy-drama film

- Directed by: Ron Murphy
- Written by: Ron Murphy; Nick Torokvei
- Produced by: Maddy Falle; Elizabeth Levine; Ron Murphy; William Woods
- Starring: Christopher Walken; Ella Ballentine; Jane Curtin; Deborah Grover
- Cinematography: Jeremy Benning
- Edited by: Trevor Ambrose
- Music by: Nikhil Seetharam
- Production companies: Page 12 Pictures; Roundtable Entertainment
- Distributed by: VVS Films
- Release date: September 13, 2026 (TIFF)
- Running time: 92 minutes
- Country: Canada
- Language: English

Back in Black is a Canadian black comedy thriller film, directed by Ron Murphy and released in 2026. The film stars Christopher Walken as Clyde Mortimer, a struggling funeral director in a small town who is financially struggling due to the wellness craze meaning that people aren't dying like they used to, until his apprentice granddaughter Sam (Ella Ballentine) decides to take matters into her own hands to help her family's business thrive again.

The cast also includes Jane Curtin as Clyde's wife Autumn, as well as Deborah Grover, Stuart Hughes, Watson Rose, Russell Yuen, Mary Ashton, Louise Lambert, Tom Keat, Angelica Alejandro, Sandra Flores, Giamo Alfredi, Christian Laurin and Carl Hines in supporting roles.

== Release ==
The film premiered in the Centrepiece program at the 2026 Toronto International Film Festival. It is also slated to screen in the Borsos Competition program at the 2026 Whistler Film Festival.
