= Michael Konyves =

Canadian screenwriter

Michael Konyves is a Canadian film and television screenwriter. He is best known for his screenplay for the comedy-drama film Barney's Version (2010), which earned him a Genie Award for Best Adapted Screenplay nomination. His notable credits include the television films Descent (2005), Solar Attack (2006), Fire and Ice: The Dragon Chronicles (2008), and the television series Bad Blood (2017) and Wild Cards (2024).

== Awards and nominations ==
Year	Award	Category	Nominated work	Result
2011	31st Genie Awards	Best Adapted Screenplay	Barney's Version	Nominated
2011	13th Jutra Awards	Best Screenplay	Barney's Version	Nominated
2011	15th Canadian Screenwriting Awards	Feature Film	Barney's Version	Won
2018	6th Canadian Screen Awards	Best Writing, Drama Program or Limited Series	Bad Blood	Nominated
2019	7th Canadian Screen Awards	Best Writing, Drama series	Bad Blood	Won
