= Jason Blicker =

Canadian film and television actor

- Occupation: Actor
- Years active: 1986–present

Jason Blicker is a Canadian film and television actor. He has had several small roles in television series including recurring roles on Robocop, F/X: The Series, State of Grace, NYPD Blue, and Boston Legal, as well as roles films such as Half Baked, The Day After Tomorrow and Hidden 3D.

== Filmography ==
=== Film ===
Year	Title	Role	Notes
1988	Switching Channels	Sound Man	
1988	Iron Eagle II	Hickman	
1989	Sing	Ari	
1989	American Boyfriends	Marty Kaplan	
1989	The Rookie	DeSantos	
1991	The Taking of Beverly Hills	Cop / Thief #3	
1992	Baby on Board	Frankie	
1993	La Florida	Jay Lamori	
1994	Relative Fear	Dennison	
1995	No Contest	Roger Stalwart	
1995	Jungleground	Ferret	
1995	Iron Eagle on the Attack	Sergeant Osgood	
1996	Hollow Point	Train Yard Hood	
1997	Pale Saints	Betting Clerk	
1998	Half Baked	Detective	
1998	One Tough Cop	Philly Nose	
1999	Superstar	Howard	
2001	Under Heavy Fire	Fred	
2003	Owning Mahowny	Dave Quinson	
2004	The Day After Tomorrow	Paul	
2009	Puck Hogs	Albert Mankins	
2010	Trader Games	Henry	
2011	Hidden 3D	Simon	
2013	Real Gangsters	Mob Thug	
2014	The Captive	Sam	
2014	The Big Fat Stone	Levine	
2015	Life	Journalist	
2015	Bark Ranger	Larry Festrunk	
2015	No Deposit	Jake Coleman	
2015	The Walk	Officer Daley	
2016	Nine Lives	EMT #1	
2018	The Joke Thief	William McCabe	

=== Television ===
Year	Title	Role	Notes
1986	As Is	Hospital Worker	Television film
1986	Many Happy Returns	Dave Kemp	Television film
1987	Night Heat	Eric	Episode: "Tell Me a Story"
1987–1992	Street Legal	Lenny Costa / Street Vendor	4 episodes
1988	The Return of Ben Casey	Dr. Jacobs	Television film
1988	War of the Worlds	Pete	Episode: "Goliath Is My Name"
1988, 1989	Friday the 13th: The Series	Danny / Todd	2 episodes
1989	Alfred Hitchcock Presents	Freak	Episode: "Night Creatures"
1989	C.B.C.'s Magic Hour	Donnie Desanto	Episode: "Rookies"
1989	My Secret Identity	Stark	Episode: "Collision Course"
1989	African Journey	Luke Novak	Television film
1990–1991	Max Glick	Rabbi Teitelman	6 episodes
1992	Amy Fisher: My Story	Darren	Television film
1992	The Trial of Red Riding Hood	A.C. Porker	Television film
1992, 1993	Secret Service	Munsey / Oliver	2 episodes
1992, 1995	Forever Knight	Bobby Matteo	2 episodes
1993	Kung Fu: The Legend Continues	Jesse	Episode: "Force of Habit"
1993	Matrix	Murray	Episode: "Conviction of His Courage"
1993	JFK: Reckless Youth	McGuire	2 episodes
1994	Getting Gotti	Frank	Television film
1994	RoboCop	Aubrey Fox	5 episodes
1994	Picture Windows	Paul	Episode: "Song of Songs"
1994	Sirens	Earl Dodd	Episode: "The Needle and the Damage Done"
1995	Almost Golden: The Jessica Savitch Story	Adam Murphy	Television film
1995	The Hardy Boys	Danny Peck	Episode: "A Perfect Stranger"
1996	Gridlock	Charlie Runnels	Television film
1996	Due South	Agent Helms	Episode: "The Edge"
1996–1998	F/X: The Series	Detective Francis Gatti	39 episodes
1996–2003	The Newsroom	Shane / The Agent	3 episodes
1997	Ally McBeal	Rabbi Stern	Episode: "The Attitude"
1998	Michael Hayes	Jacob Heschel	Episode: "Mob Mentality"
1998	Brooklyn South	Allen Venable	2 episodes
1998	The Wonderful World of Disney	Peter Gorman	Episode: "The Garbage Picking Field Goal Kicking Philadelphia Phenomenon"
1998	Naked City: Justice with a Bullet	Alonzo	Television film
1998	Fantasy Island	Tom	Episode: "We're Not Worthy"
1998	Naked City: A Killer Christmas	Officer Alonzo	Television film
2001	The Tracker	Jack "Chick" Cicollini	Television film
2001	Jenifer	Neurologist	Television film
2001	State of Grace	Uncle Heschie	39 episodes
2002	The Glow	Allan	Television film
2002	Gleason	Sol Friedman	Television film
2003	She Spies	Garrett Collins	Episode: "Cover Me"
2003	Full-Court Miracle	Marshall Schlotsky	Television film
2004	Crown Heights	Moshe Simon	Television film
2004	NYPD Blue	Roy Wingate	Episode: "The Brothers Grim"
2004	Perfect Strangers	JJ Katz	Television film
2005	The Eleventh Hour	Rainer	Episode: "Kettle Black"
2005–2006	Boston Legal	Duncan Jones / Timothy Simms	3 episodes
2005	The Average Jeff's Guide to Canada	Jeffrey Alan Schechter	Television film
2006	G-Spot	Kim Grant	Episode: "Lucky"
2006	Eartstorm	Tony	Television film
2006	CSI: Miami	George Kornspan	Episode: "Going, Going, Gone"
2007	CSI: Crime Scene Investigation	Elliot	Episode: "Leapin' Lizards"
2008	MVP	Edgar	Episode: "Mad Scramble"
2008	Wisegal	Dante Montanari	Television film
2009–2010	Cra$h & Burn	Detective Darrin	5 episodes
2010	Harriet the Spy: Blog Wars	Sol	Television film
2010	Living in Your Car	Alex Lambert	6 episodes
2010	The Santa Suit	Norm Dobson	Television film
2011	Little Mosque on the Prairie	Mattress Salesman	Episode: "Brother, Can You Spare a Mosque?"
2011	Single White Spenny	Norm	Episode: "Open Relationship"
2011	Warehouse 13	Aaron Sawyer	Episode: "Trials"
2011	Lost Girl	Frank	Episode: "Scream a Little Dream"
2012	Do No Harm	Detective Wallers	Television film
2012	King	Paulie Franconi	Episode: "Josh Simpson"
2012	The Firm	Russell Savoca	Episode: "Chapter Seventeen"
2012	The L.A. Complex	Lance Randoon	Episode: "Be a Man"
2012	XIII: The Series	Barry Salters	2 episodes
2013	Cracked	Joseph Podolski	Episode: "No Traveller Returns"
2013	Nikita	Thomas Leonard	Episode: "Black Badge"
2013	Hannibal	Joel Summers	Episode: "Trou Normand"
2014	The Best Laid Plans	Malcolm Roxborough	Episode: "Going Brogue"
2014	The Listener	Jessie Worther	Episode: "Amouse Boushe"
2014	Odd Squad	Frank	Episode: "Soundcheck/Double Trouble"
2017	What Would Sal Do?	Joe	6 episodes
2017	Save Me	Cop #1	Episode: "Possible Anaphylaxis"
2017	Saving Hope	Randy Rogen	2 episodes
2018	In Contempt	Officer Crater	Episode: "Combat by Agreement"
2019	The Crossword Mysteries	Driver	Episode: "A Puzzle to Die For"
2019	Murdoch Mysteries	David Dillinger	Episode: "Toronto the Bad"
2019–2021	Jann	Todd	13 episodes
2020	The Umbrella Academy	Desk Cop	2 episodes
2021	Frankie Drake Mysteries	Mickey	Episode: "The Girls Can't Help it"
