= Cristina Rosato =

Canadian actress (born 1983)

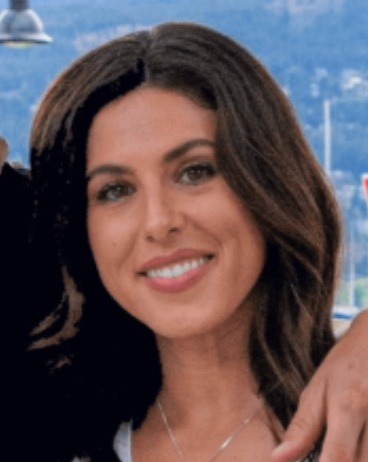
- Rosato in 2020
- Born: January 6, 1983 (age 43); Montreal, Quebec, Canada
- Occupation: Actress
- Years active: 2003–present
- Partner: Greyston Holt
- Children: 1

Cristina Rosato (born January 6, 1983) is a Canadian actress. She has appeared in TV series such as Rookie Blue, Trauma and Turner and Hooch.

== Early life ==
Rosato studied acting at The American Academy of Dramatic Arts in Los Angeles.

== Career ==
Rosata has appeared in films such as Let the Game Begin, Hidden 3D and Bad Santa 2 and has voiced characters in video games such as Caterina Sforza in the Assassin's Creed video game series.

Rosato played the role of Dr. Giulia Amato in the long running French medical drama series, Trauma. The role called for an Italian speaking Anglophone who also spoke French which fit her perfectly. Rosato subsequently played a similar tole in the French series Les Jeunes Loups when she played Italian journalist Gabriella Fiori-Bertoni.

In 2019, Rosato was filming 'The Vegas' in Argentina when the pandemic called off shooting for a while.

In 2021, Rosato joined the cast of the Disney+ action-comedy series, Turner & Hooch which was inspired by the 1986 film of the same name. Her character is an Oakland cop called Olivia.

Rosato co-wrote a children's book with her cousin during the pandemic called 'A Hero Too' in which proceeds went to the Save the Children foundation.

== Filmography ==
=== Film ===
Year	Title	Role	Notes
2003	One Hot Rotting, Zombie Love Song	Cheryl	Short film
2005	La dernière incarnation	Julie	
2005	Pure	Nicole	
2010	Let the Game Begin	Francine	
2010	Territories	Michelle Harris	
2011	Son of Morning	Maria Sanchez	
2011	Hidden 3D	Annie Cliché	
2011	Conduct Unbecoming	Maria Fox	
2014	Hot Air	Honey (voice)	Short film
2016	Madame Hollywood	Cristina	
2016	Bad Santa 2	Alice	
2016	Ainsi soit-elle	Alice Desautels	Short film
2017	mother!	Actress	
2018	Another Kind of Wedding	Mareva De La Torre	
2018	Abducted : Finding My Daughter	Ashley Quinn	
2018	Little Italy	Gina	
2019	Mafia Inc.	Vicky	
2026	Unholy Night	Angela	

=== Television ===
Year	Title	Role	Notes
2004	False Pretenses	Eva	TV film
2009	Les invincibles	Jessica	Episodes: 3.6, 3.7
2010	Blue Mountain State	Whitney	Episode: "LAX"
2010	18 to Life	Kate	Episode: "Wingman"
2010	Perfect Plan	Rebecca / Brenna Lakefield	TV film
2011	Murdoch Mysteries	Sophie / Jacqueline Chiasson	Episode: "Monsieur Murdoch"
2011	Flashpoint	Esmeralda "Esmie" Vargas	Episode: "Cost of Doing Business"
2011	Lost Girl	Sheri	Episode: "Fae Gone Wild"
2012	XIII: The Series	Gale Westlund / Jennifer	Episode: "Tempest"
2013	Survival Code	Bettina	TV film
2013	Exploding Sun	Marta Hernandez	TV film
2013	Republic of Doyle	Samantha Kaye	Episode: "The Devil Inside"
2013	Rookie Blue	Francesca	Episode: "Homecoming"
2013	Finding Christmas	Mia	Hallmark Movie
2013-14	Trauma	Giulia Amaro	Recurring role
2014	Les Jeunes Loups	Gabriella Fiori-Bertoni	TV series
2014	Saving Hope	Anna Danko	Episode: "Awakenings"
2015	Nouvelle Adresse	Soledad	TV series
2015	Helix	Leila Weisner	Episodes: "San Jose", "Ectogenesis"
2015	Remedy	Monica Davis	Episodes: "When You Awoke", "Life in Technicolour", "Secrets and Lies"
2015	Reign	Lady Donatella	Episode: "Betrothed"
2015	The Art of More	Belinda Romero	Recurring role
2016	Bitten	Sonja	Episode: "Of Sonders Weight"
2016	iZombie	Helvetica	Episode: "Pour Some Sugar, Zombie"
2016	Final Destiny	Anushka	TV film
2016	Summer Villa	Leslie	Hallmark Movie
2017	21 Thunder	Ana Messina	Recurring role
2018	Abducted: Finding My Daughter	Ashley Quinn	TV film
2020	The Good Doctor	Ann Stewart	Episode: "Influence"
2021	Turner & Hooch	Olivia	3 episodes
2022	Hudson and Rex		Episode: "Dog Days are Over"

=== Video games ===
Year	Title	Role	Notes
2009	Assassin's Creed II	Caterina Sforza	Voice role
2010	Assassin's Creed: Brotherhood	Caterina Sforza	Voice role
2013	Assassin's Creed IV: Black Flag	Melanie Lemay	Voice role
2014	Assassin's Creed Rogue	Melanie Lemay	Voice role
2016	Deus Ex: Mankind Divided	ShadowChild - System Rift DLC	Voice role
