= When Innocence Is Lost =

1997 American drama television film

When Innocence Is Lost is a 1997 American drama television film directed by Bethany Rooney and written by Deborah Jones. The music of the film was composed by Dennis McCarthy. It stars Keri Russell, Jill Clayburgh, Vince Corazza, Julie Khaner, and Charlotte Sullivan.

== Plot ==
When Erica French (Keri Russell) decides to keep the baby she conceived in high school, she never dreamed that one day she would be fighting for custody against the child's father, Scott Stone (Vince Corazza). Scott Stone initially fought for custody when Erica threatened to cut off his access to their daughter. He continues to try to be a part of her life, but when Molly first breaks her arm at the playground and Scott's mother finds mysterious bruises on her granddaughter, Scott again fights for custody of young Molly. This time, he wins because the court believes his family can provide a more stable environment for Molly than a public daycare can.

== Cast ==
- Keri Russell as Erica French
- Jill Clayburgh as Susan French
- Vince Corazza as Scott Stone
- Julie Khaner as Erica's Lawyer
- Charlotte Sullivan as Annie French
- Roberta Maxwell as Cynthia Adams
- Barry Flatman as David Trask
- Nicole de Boer as Nancy
- Neil Dainard as Judge Carter
- John Neville as Mr Laurence
- Mary Wickes as Aunt March
- Deborah Grover as Barbara Stone
