= Deborah Grover =

Canadian actress

- Born: January 11, 1952 (age 74); Ottawa, Ontario, Canada
- Occupation: Actress
- Years active: 1983–present
- Children: 2
- Mother: Joan Richards

Deborah Grover is a Canadian actress, known for her regular roles as prosecuting attorney Elaine Jeffers in Night Heat and Nora in Jann.

== Early life and education ==
Grover studied acting and dance, attending classes at the National Arts Centre, Ottawa, the Ryerson Theatre School, Toronto, and two summers in Alberta at the Banff Centre for Arts and Creativity.

== Career ==
=== Stage ===
On stage, Grover performs theatre plays including roles in David Hare's Stuff Happens (2009), Huda in Heather Raffo's 9 Parts of Desire (2010), Mummy in Stockholm (2012), Madeleine in Savannah Bay (2014–15), Sonja in Michael Frayn's The Two of Us (2018), and Frau Henne in Bremen Town (2023), among others.

=== Screen ===
Grover has over thirty theatrical film credits, beginning with her role as Sister Anne in the 1985 film, Agnes of God, and continuing with appearances in The Gate (1987), The Uncles (2000), Fatman (2020), The Shipping News (2001), Where the Truth Lies (2005), Six Figures (2005), and Alice, Darling (2022).

She also appears in television movies, including The Christmas Wife (1988), Under the Piano (1996), When Innocence Is Lost (1997), and Rated X (2000), in addition to the miniseries Bag of Bones (2011), The Kennedys (2011), and The Firm (2012).

In addition to her regular roles on Night Heat and Jann, Grover has had multiple appearances on Our Hero (2000–01), How to Be Indie (2009–10), Happy Town (2010), Sensitive Skin (2016), Orphan Black (2017), and a regular role as Tillie on the sci-fi horror series From (2023–24).

Grover's television guest appearances include Counterstrike (1993), Instant Star (2007), Love You To Death (2007), Breakout Kings (2011), Satisfaction (2013), The Strain (2014), Shadowhunters: The Mortal Instruments (2019), Northern Rescue (2019), Dare Me (2020), and Good Witch (2021), among others.

Voice roles

Grover also voiced the roles of Kassandra and Hippolyte in the 2011 video game Warriors: Legends of Troy.

== Award nominations ==
Grover is a two-time Canadian Screen Award nominee for Guest Performance in a Drama Series, including her role as Josephine Barry in Anne with an E, and her performance as Donna in Mary Kills People.

== Personal life ==
Grover is the mother of two daughters.

== Filmography ==
=== Film ===
- 1985: Agnes of God – Sister Anne
- 1987: The Gate – Mom
- 1999: Dick – Pat Nixon
- 1999: Water Damage – Mary Swoffa
- 2000: The Uncles – Nancy Rossi
- 2001: The Shipping News – Edna Buggit
- 2004: Welcome to Mooseport – Airport Passenger
- 2005: Where the Truth Lies – Mrs. O'Flaherty
- 2005: Six Figures – Louise
- 2020: Fatman – Anne Marie
- 2010: Nexus – Louise
- 2015: Regression – Old Woman
- 2017: Don't Talk to Irene – Ruth
- 2018: His Perfect Obsession – Cecilia
- 2022: Alice, Darling – Volunteer #3
- 2026: Back in Black - Ingrid

=== Television ===
Deborah Grover television credits
| Year | Title | Role | Notes | Ref. |
|---|---|---|---|---|
| 1984 | The Littlest Hobo | Anna Emery | 1 episode | |
| 1985–1989 | Night Heat | Prosecutor Elaine Jeffers | Regular role | |
| 1987 | Walking on Air | Barbara Pearson | TV movie | |
| 1987 | Taking Care of Terrific | Mrs Crowley | TV movie | |
| 1988 | ''The Christmas Wife | Micki | TV movie | |
| 1991 | My Secret Identity | Judge Daley | 1 episode | |
| 1993 | Counterstrike | Karen Locklee | Episode: "The Raw Truth" | |
| 1996 | Her Desperate Choice | Kathy (Shelter) | TV movie | |
| 1996 | Under the Piano | Nurse Thompson | TV movie | |
| 1997 | Mary Higgins Clark's While My Pretty One Sleeps | Kitty Conway | TV movie | |
| 1997 | When Innocence Is Lost | Barbara Stone | TV movie | |
| 1998 | A Father for Brittany (A Change of Heart) | Judge Harriot Richardson | TV movie | |
| 1998 | PSI Factor: Chronicles of the Paranormal | Madeline | 1 episode | |
| 1999 | Half a Dozen Babies (Life's Little Struggles) | Fiona Sullivan | TV movie | |
| 2000 | Rated X | Georgia Mae | TV movie | |
| 2000–2001 | Our Hero | Ms. Terzik-Sykes | 4 episodes | |
| 2002 | Framed | Mrs. Ashton | TV movie | |
| 2002 | Monk | Mrs. Butterworth | 1 episode | |
| 2002 | Mutant X | Virginia Beals | 1 episode | |
| 2005 | Our Fathers | Judge Sweeney | TV movie | |
| 2007 | Still Small Voices | Anne Hartley | TV movie | |
| 2007 | Instant Star | Mrs. McNally | 1 episode | |
| 2007 | Love You To Death | Mrs. Jones | 1 episode | |
| 2008 | Roxy Hunter and the Myth of the Mermaid | Ms. Slausen | TV movie | |
| 2008 | Princess | Nana | TV movie | |
| 2009 | A Sister's Secret | Florence | TV movie | |
| 2009–2010 | How to Be Indie | Ms. Roland | 6 episodes | |
| 2010 | Happy Town | Joanie Jenkins | 7 episodes | |
| 2011 | Breakout Kings | Wanda O'Connell | 1 episode | |
| 2011 | Bag of Bones | Rogette Whitmore | TV miniseries | |
| 2011 | The Kennedys | Mother Superior | TV miniseries | |
| 2012 | The Firm | Maxine Sutherland | TV miniseries | |
| 2012 | Copper | Widow Woman | 1 episode | |
| 2013 | Satisfaction | Security Guard | 1 episode | |
| 2014 | The Strain | Family Court Judge | 1 episode | |
| 2015 | The Perfect Girlfriend | Kathy Matthews | TV movie | |
| 2016 | Mommy's Little Girl | Elana Connell | TV movie | |
| 2016 | Sensitive Skin | Lizzie | 3 episodes | |
| 2016 | Love on a Limb | Mrs. Haversack | TV movie | |
| 2017 | Sometimes the Good Kill | Jean | TV movie | |
| 2017 | The Perfect Soulmate | Marlene Maxson | TV movie | |
| 2017 | Orphan Black | Yolanda | 2 episodes | |
| 2019 | Northern Rescue | Theresa | 1 episode | |
| 2019 | Shadowhunters: The Mortal Instruments | Vera | 1 episode | |
| 2019–2021 | Jann | Nora | Regular role | |
| 2020 | Dare Me | Neighbor | 2 episodes | |
| 2021 | Good Witch | Ellen | 1 episode | |
| 2021 | SurrealEstate | Samanta North | 1 episode | |
| 2023–2024 | From | Tillie | Regular role | |
