= Sandra Faire =

Canadian television producer and philanthropist (died 2019)

- Born: Sandra Allard; Edmonton, Alberta, Canada
- Died: 27 February 2019; Toronto, Ontario, Canada
- Education: Carleton University
- Occupation: Television producer
- Spouse: Ivan Fecan (m. 1972)
- Children: 1

Sandra Faire (née Allard; died February 27, 2019) was a Canadian television producer and philanthropist. She created music specials for Canadian entertainers such as Anne Murray, and was executive producer of So You Think You Can Dance Canada. Her career lasted over four decades.

== Early life ==
The daughter of Alice Tonstad and broadcaster Jim Allard, Sandra Allard was born in Edmonton, Alberta. She attended Carleton University before beginning work at television station CJOH in Ottawa, Ontario.

== Career ==
In 1972, Faire began her television-producing career as associate producer for Half the George Kirby Comedy Hour, which was taped in Toronto. From the 1970s into the 1990s, Faire was a producer with CBC Television, where she created and produced variety entertainment programs such as The Joyce Davidson Show, Video Hits, and Comics!. In 1997, she founded and operated her own private production firm, Sandra Faire & Associates, which produced programming primarily for CTV and The Comedy Network.

The company's productions include Comedy Now!, Comedy Inc., The Holmes Show and So You Think You Can Dance Canada, as well as television specials for musicians such as k.d. lang, Rita MacNeil, Bryan Adams, Buffy Sainte-Marie, Corey Hart, The Rankin Family, Amanda Marshall and Anne Murray. The company also produced the feature film My Own Private Oshawa.

In 2008, she received an honorary doctor of laws from York University. In 2012, she was awarded a Queen Elizabeth II Diamond Jubilee Medal for culture and the arts.

== Personal life ==
She took the name Faire when she first married; the couple had one daughter, and the marriage ended in divorce. She later married Ivan Fecan, an executive with CTV. The marriage lasted 37 years, ending with her death. The couple were involved in philanthropy, acting as patrons or sponsors of institutions such as the Art Gallery of Ontario, the National Ballet of Canada, Soulpepper Theatre Company, the Hospital for Sick Children and York University, as well as creating the Sandra Faire and Ivan Fecan Dance Fund, a scholarship fund for dance students which has also provided prize money to non-winning finalists on So You Think You Can Dance Canada.

Faire died on February 27, 2019, at her home in Toronto.
