= Jann (TV series) =

Canadian TV comedy series

- Genre: Comedy
- Created by: Jann Arden; Leah Gauthier; Jennica Harper
- Starring: Jann Arden; Zoie Palmer; Deborah Grover; Patrick Gilmore; Elena Juatco; Jason Blicker; Sharon Taylor; Alexa Rose Steele
- Composer: Russell Broom
- Country of origin: Canada
- Original language: English
- No. of seasons: 3
- No. of episodes: 22 (+1 special)

Production
- Executive producers: Jann Arden; Leah Gauthier; Jennica Harper; Andrew Barnsley; Ben Murray; Tom Cox; Jordy Randall; Randy Lennox
- Producer: Brian Dennis
- Production locations: Calgary, Alberta
- Editor: Aren Hansen
- Running time: 20–22 minutes
- Production companies: Bell Media; Project 10 Productions; SEVEN24 Films

Original release
- Network: CTV
- Release: March 20, 2019 – November 15, 2021

Jann is a Canadian comedy television series that premiered on CTV on March 20, 2019. It stars Canadian singer-songwriter Jann Arden as a fictionalized version of herself and is loosely based on events from her life. The cast also includes Zoie Palmer, Patrick Gilmore, Deborah Grover, Elena Juatco, Alexa Rose Steele, and Jason Blicker.

On June 9, 2019, the series was renewed for a second season, which premiered on September 21, 2020. On June 10, 2020, it was renewed for a third season, which premiered on September 27, 2021. A one-hour holiday special, titled Jann: Alone for the Holidays, premiered on December 9, 2022. In a 2024 interview with the Calgary Herald, Arden said that while series is not cancelled, it has not been greenlit for a fourth season but is optimistic that it will happen.

== Plot ==
Jann is a former pop star struggling to cope with turmoil in her personal life, including the breakup of her relationship with Cynthia, her longtime girlfriend, her mother's diagnosis of early-stage dementia, and trying to rebuild her career in the hope of finally outshining her archrival Sarah McLachlan.

== Cast and characters ==
- Jann Arden as her fictional self
- Zoie Palmer as Max, Jann's younger sister
- Deborah Grover as Nora, Jann's mother
- Patrick Gilmore as Dave, Max's husband and Jann's brother in law
- Elena Juatco as Cale, Jann's new manager
- Jason Blicker as Todd, Jann's long-term manager
- Sharon Taylor as Cynthia, Jann's ex-partner
- Alexa Rose Steele as Charley, Jann's eldest niece

== Episodes ==
Season	Episodes	Originally released	
Season	Episodes	First released	Last released
1	6	March 20, 2019	April 24, 2019
2	8	September 21, 2020	November 9, 2020
3	8	September 27, 2021	November 15, 2021
Special		December 9, 2022	

=== Season 1 (2019) ===
No. overall	No. in season	Title	Directed by	Written by	Original release date	Canadian viewers (millions)
1	1	"The Big House"	Ron Murphy	Story by : Jann Arden and Jennica Harper; Teleplay by : Jennica Harper	March 20, 2019	1.01
2	2	"Go With the Flowga"	Ron Murphy	Leah Gauthier and Jennica Harper	March 27, 2019	N/A
3	3	"Weeknd at Charley's"	Ron Murphy	Mike McPhaden	April 3, 2019	N/A
4	4	"Major Party Foul"	Ron Murphy	Leah Gauthier and Nelu Handa	April 10, 2019	N/A
5	5	"You've Been Soft Served"	Ron Murphy	Leah Gauthier and Jennica Harper	April 17, 2019	1.14
6	6	"WWJD (What Will Jann Do?)"	Ron Murphy	Story by : Jennica Harper; Teleplay by : Jason Filiatrault and Jennica Harper	April 24, 2019	N/A

=== Season 2 (2020) ===
No. overall	No. in season	Title	Directed by	Written by	Original release date	Canadian viewers
7	1	"What Did Jann Do?"	Ron Murphy	Leah Gauthier & Jennica Harper	September 21, 2020	736,000
8	2	"Last Straws"	Ron Murphy	Leah Gauthier & Jennica Harper	September 28, 2020	N/A
9	3	"Tomato, Tomato"	Ron Murphy	Mike McPhaden	October 5, 2020	N/A
10	4	"The Go Girls Go"	Ron Murphy	Sophie Caird & Leah Gauthier	October 12, 2020	N/A
11	5	"Drop the Single"	Ron Murphy	Nelu Handa	October 19, 2020	N/A
12	6	"Covered in Balls"	Ron Murphy	Jennica Harper & Mike McPhaden	October 26, 2020	N/A
13	7	"Road Trippin'"	Ron Murphy	Leah Gauthier	November 2, 2020	N/A
14	8	"The Tunies"	Ron Murphy	Jennica Harper	November 9, 2020	N/A

=== Season 3 (2021) ===
No. overall	No. in season	Title	Directed by	Written by	Original release date	Canadian viewers
15	1	"Help Wanted"	Ron Murphy	Leah Gauthier & Jennica Harper	September 27, 2021	N/A
16	2	"Lost and Found"	Ron Murphy	Leah Gauthier & Jennica Harper	October 4, 2021	N/A
17	3	"Marty Crashers"	Ron Murphy	Mike McPhaden	October 11, 2021	N/A
18	4	"Pancaking"	Ron Murphy	Nelu Handa	October 18, 2021	N/A
19	5	"Hall Pass or Fail"	Ron Murphy	Sophie Caird & Mike McPhaden	October 25, 2021	N/A
20	6	"The Money Train"	Ron Murphy	Jennica Harper & JP Larocque	November 1, 2021	N/A
21	7	"Whofundit"	Ron Murphy	Leah Gauthier	November 8, 2021	N/A
22	8	"No Drama"	Ron Murphy	Leah Gauthier & Jennica Harper	November 15, 2021	N/A

=== Special ===
Title	Directed by	Written by	Original release date
"Jann: Alone for the Holidays"	Ron Murphy	Leah Gauthier & Jennica Harper	December 9, 2022

== Production ==
Production on six half-hour episodes for Season 1 began in Calgary on September 11, 2018. Production on Season 2, consisting of eight episodes, began on October 1, 2019, and wrapped in early November 2019. Production on Season 3, consisting of eight episodes, began on February 25, 2021.

Sarah McLachlan appears as herself in a guest role in the second season. Jann has clarified in interviews that she and Sarah get along well in real life, and their fictionalized rivalry in the television series draws as much from Sarah's own ideas as Jann's.

Other guests in the second season include Keshia Chanté as Nia Taylor, an up-and-coming new singer signed by Todd after he drops Jann as a client; Elisha Cuthbert as Liz, a school board trustee; and Miguel Rivas as Nigel, a megafan of Jann's.

Guests in the third season include Michael Bublé as himself, Tegan and Sara, and Bif Naked.

Guests in the holiday special included Bryan Adams and Michael Bublé as themselves.

== Release ==
Jann premiered on March 20, 2019, with its first season becoming the "most-watched" Canadian television series and comedy of the year.

In October 2020, Hulu acquired American distribution rights to the series. They released the first two seasons in January 2021. In January 2023, the series left Hulu and is now on The Roku Channel in the US, with them acquiring the first two seasons of the series and released the third one at its launch on the platform on January 17, 2023. Roku has since pulled the show from The Roku Channel.

== Accolades ==
The series has been nominated for awards such as the Canadian Screen Awards, Canadian Society of Cinematographers, Leo Awards and Writers Guild of Canada.

Year	Award	Category	Recipient	Result	Ref.
2020	Canadian Screen Awards	Best Comedy Series	Jann	Nominated	
2020	Canadian Screen Awards	Best Lead Actress	Jann Arden	Nominated	
2020	Canadian Screen Awards	Best Guest Performance	Rick Mercer	Nominated	
2021	Canadian Screen Awards	Best Guest Performance	Elisha Cuthbert	Nominated	
2021	Canadian Screen Awards	Best Photography in a Comedy Series	Brett Van Dyke for "The Tunies"	Nominated	
2021	Canadian Screen Awards	Best Writing, Comedy Series	Jennica Harper for "The Tunies"	Nominated	
2021	Canadian Screen Awards	Best Writing, Comedy Series	Leah Gauthier and Jennica Harper for "What Did Jann Do"	Nominated	
2022	Canadian Screen Awards	Best Comedy Series	Jann	Nominated	
2022	Canadian Screen Awards	Best Lead Actress	Jann Arden	Nominated	
2022	Canadian Screen Awards	Best Writing, Comedy Series	Leah Gauthier and Jennica Harper for "No Drama"	Nominated	
2022	Canadian Screen Awards	Best Achievement in Casting, Fiction	Lisa Parasyn and Rhonda Fisekci	Nominated	
2022	Canadian Screen Awards	Best Guest Performance, Comedy	Michael Bublé for "No Drama"	Won	
2024	Canadian Screen Awards	Variety or Entertainment Special	Jann: Alone for the Holidays	Nominated	
2024	Canadian Screen Awards	Variety or Sketch Comedy Program or Series	Leah Gauthier and Jennica Harper for Jann: Alone for the Holidays	Nominated	
2021	Writers Guild of Canada	Best TV Comedy	Jann Arden and Jennica Harper	Won	
