= Children Ruin Everything =

Canadian sitcom television series

- Genre: Sitcom
- Created by: Kurt Smeaton
- Starring: Meaghan Rath; Aaron Abrams; Ennis Esmer; Nazneen Contractor; Logan Nicholson; Mikayla SwamiNathan; Dmitry Chepovetsky; Darius Rota; Veena Sood; Lisa Codrington
- Composer: Nikhil Seetharam
- Country of origin: Canada
- Original language: English
- No. of seasons: 4
- No. of episodes: 50

Production
- Executive producers: Chuck Tatham; Kurt Smeaton; Mark Montefiore
- Production companies: New Metric Media; Sticky Fingers Productions Inc.; Bell Media

Original release
- Network: CTV
- Release: January 12, 2022 – February 27, 2025

Children Ruin Everything is a Canadian television sitcom, that premiered on CTV on January 12, 2022. Created by Kurt Smeaton for CTV, and originally Roku and later The CW, and co-produced by New Metric Media and Bell Media Studios, the series focuses on Astrid (Meaghan Rath) and James (Aaron Abrams), a young couple struggling to define their lives outside of their role as parents.

Smeaton described the series as inspired by his understanding that parenting "is time-consuming and expensive and frustrating. So I wanted to create a show that acknowledged that but also showed the other side, which is having a family is worth it."

== Cast and characters ==
- Meaghan Rath as Astrid, a mother of three
- Aaron Abrams as James, Astrid's husband, a father of three
- Ennis Esmer as Ennis, James's best friend and co-worker
- Nazneen Contractor as Dawn, Astrid's sister
- Logan Nicholson as Felix, Astrid and James's seven-year-old (eight-year-old) son
- Mikayla SwamiNathan as Viv, Astrid and James's four-year-old daughter
- Dmitry Chepovetsky as Bo, Dawn's husband
- Darius Rota as Corey, Dawn and Bo's 10-year-old son
- Veena Sood as Nisha, Astrid and Dawn's mother
- Lisa Codrington as Marla, James and Ennis's boss
- Amalia Williamson as Bubblegum

== Development ==
The series is executive produced by Chuck Tatham, alongside Smeaton and Mark Montefiore.

=== Production and distribution ===
On February 4, 2022, CTV and Roku renewed the series for a second season, which premiered on September 19, 2022 in Canada. It premiered in the United States on February 3, 2023, with the first 8 episodes of the season released, with the second 8-episode half releasing May 12, 2023. On April 18, 2023, it was announced that CTV had renewed the series for a third season, comprising 10 episodes. On May 6, 2024, it was announced that CTV had renewed the series for a fourth season, comprising 16 episodes. In February 2025, the series was confirmed to conclude with the fourth season.

== Episodes ==
=== Series overview ===
| Season | Episodes | Originally released | |
| Season | Episodes | First released | Last released |
|---|---|---|---|
| 1 | 8 | January 12, 2022 | February 23, 2022 |
| 2 | 16 | September 19, 2022 | February 20, 2023 |
| 3 | 10 | September 27, 2023 | November 29, 2023 |
| 4 | 16 | October 17, 2024 | February 27, 2025 |

=== Season 1 (2022) ===
| No. overall | No. in season | Title | Directed by | Written by | Original release date | Prod. code | Canadian viewers |
|---|---|---|---|---|---|---|---|
| 1 | 1 | "Meals" | Renuka Jeyapalan | Kurt Smeaton | January 12, 2022 | 402170-1 | N/A |
| 2 | 2 | "Bodies" | Melanie Orr | Kathleen Phillips | January 19, 2022 | 402170-4 | N/A |
| 3 | 3 | "Intimacy" | Renuka Jeyapalan | Courtney Jane Walker | January 26, 2022 | 402170-2 | N/A |
| 4 | 4 | "Truth" | Melanie Orr | Anita Kapila | February 2, 2022 | 402170-9 | N/A |
| 5 | 5 | "Sick Days" | Renuka Jeyapalan | Andrew De Angelis | February 9, 2022 | 402170-8 | 707,000 |
| 6 | 6 | "Roadtrips" | Renuka Jeyapalan | Kurt Smeaton | February 13, 2022 | 402170-7 | 721,000 |
| 7 | 7 | "Death" | Melanie Orr | Andrew De Angelis & Wendy Litner | February 16, 2022 | 402170-6 | 638,000 |
| 8 | 8 | "Space" | Melanie Orr | Kurt Smeaton & Jessica Meya | February 23, 2022 | 402170-5 | N/A |

=== Season 2 (2022–23) ===
| No. overall | No. in season | Title | Directed by | Written by | Original release date | Prod. code |
|---|---|---|---|---|---|---|
| 9 | 1 | "Sleep" | Melanie Orr | Kurt Smeaton | September 19, 2022 | 402170-9 |
| 10 | 2 | "Friends" | Melanie Orr | Jessica Meya | September 26, 2022 | 402170-12 |
| 11 | 3 | "Dignity" | Melanie Orr | Kathleen Phillips & Nadine Bhabha | October 3, 2022 | 402170-11 |
| 12 | 4 | "Screen Time" | Melanie Orr | Andrew De Angelis | October 10, 2022 | 402170-14 |
| 13 | 5 | "Privacy" | Peter Huang | Andrew De Angelis & Rob Michaels | October 17, 2022 | 402170-3; 402170-10 |
| 14 | 6 | "Fairness" | Peter Huang | Shebli Zarghami | October 24, 2022 | 402170-17 |
| 15 | 7 | "Identity" | Peter Huang | Anita Kapila | November 7, 2022 | 402170-16 |
| 16 | 8 | "Each Other" | Melanie Orr | Kathleen Phillips | November 14, 2022 | 402170-15 |
| 17 | 9 | "Teamwork" | Peter Wellington | Andrew De Angelis | November 28, 2022 | 402170-19 |
| 18 | 10 | "Me Time" | Melanie Orr | Kathleen Phillips | December 5, 2022 | 402170-18 |
| 19 | 11 | "Money" | Melanie Orr | Jessica Meya | January 9, 2023 | 402170-20 |
| 20 | 12 | "Weekends" | Melanie Orr | Shebli Zarghami | January 23, 2023 | 402170-22 |
| 21 | 13 | "Arguments" | Peter Huang | Kurt Smeaton | January 30, 2023 | 402170-24 |
| 22 | 14 | "Expectations" | Peter Wellington | Kurt Smeaton | February 6, 2023 | 402170-23 |
| 23 | 15 | "Momentum" | Peter Wellington | Rob Michaels | February 13, 2023 | 402170-21 |
| 24 | 16 | "Parenting" | Peter Wellington | Kathleen Phillips & Shebli Zarghami | February 20, 2023 | 402170-13 |

=== Season 3 (2023) ===
| No. overall | No. in season | Title | Directed by | Written by | Original release date | Prod. code |
|---|---|---|---|---|---|---|
| 25 | 1 | "Therapy" | Melanie Orr | Kurt Smeaton & Jessica Meya | September 27, 2023 | 402170-25 |
| 26 | 2 | "Consequences" | Melanie Orr | Anita Kapila | October 4, 2023 | 402170-26 |
| 27 | 3 | "Confidence" | Melanie Orr | Kathleen Phillips | October 11, 2023 | 402170-27 |
| 28 | 4 | "Talking" | Justin Wu | Andrew De Angelis | October 18, 2023 | 402170-28 |
| 29 | 5 | "Clothes" | Melanie Orr | Kathleen Phillips | October 25, 2023 | 402170-29 |
| 30 | 6 | "Babysitters" | Justin Wu | Anita Kapila | November 1, 2023 | 402170-30 |
| 31 | 7 | "Spontaneity" | Kelly Fyffe-Marshall | Kurt Smeaton & Bita Joudaki | November 8, 2023 | 402170-31 |
| 32 | 8 | "Hangover" | Kurt Smeaton | Andrew De Angelis | November 15, 2023 | 402170-32 |
| 33 | 9 | "Leaving the House" | Kurt Smeaton | Jessica Meya | November 22, 2023 | 402170-33 |
| 34 | 10 | "Careers" | Kelly Fyffe-Marshall | Kurt Smeaton | November 29, 2023 | 402170-34 |

=== Season 4 (2024) ===
| No. overall | No. in season | Title | Directed by | Written by | Original release date | Prod. code |
|---|---|---|---|---|---|---|
| 35 | 1 | "Respect" | Kelly Fyffe-Marshall | Anita Kapila | October 17, 2024 | 402170-35 |
| 36 | 2 | "Recognition" | Kelly Fyffe-Marshall | Andrew De Angelis & Bita Joudaki | October 24, 2024 | 402170-36 |
| 37 | 3 | "Chores" | Mars Horodyski | Kathleen Phillips | October 31, 2024 | 402170-37 |
| 38 | 4 | "Feelings" | Mars Horodyski | Anita Kapila | November 7, 2024 | 402170-38 |
| 39 | 5 | "Bedtime" | Vanessa Matsui | Andrew De Angelis | November 14, 2024 | 402170-39 |
| 40 | 6 | "Drama" | Melanie Orr | Jessica Meya | November 21, 2024 | 402170-40 |
| 41 | 7 | "Ego" | Sasha Leigh Henry | Kurt Smeaton & Bita Joudaki | December 5, 2024 | 402170-41 |
| 42 | 8 | "Memories" | Melanie Orr | Nadine Bhabha | December 12, 2024 | 402170-42 |
| 43 | 9 | "Emergencies" | Melanie Orr | Kurt Smeaton | January 8, 2025 | 402170-43 |
| 44 | 10 | "Sex" | Allison Johnston | Andrew De Angelis | January 15, 2025 | 402170-44 |
| 45 | 11 | "Connection" | Sasha Leigh Henry | Jessica Meya | January 22, 2025 | 402170-45 |
| 46 | 12 | "Adulthood" | Allison Johnston | Kurt Smeaton & Anita Kapila | January 29, 2025 | 402170-46 |
| 47 | 13 | "Sleepovers" | Alyson Richards | Kathleen Phillips & Jessica Meya | February 5, 2025 | 402170-47 |
| 48 | 14 | "Growth" | Kurt Smeaton | Lisa Codrington | February 13, 2025 | 402170-48 |
| 49 | 15 | "Consideration" | Kurt Smeaton | Kathleen Phillips | February 20, 2025 | 402170-49 |
| 50 | 16 | "Time" | Kurt Smeaton | Kurt Smeaton | February 27, 2025 | 402170-50 |

== International broadcast ==
In the United States, it debuted on The Roku Channel on May 13, 2022, as a part of Roku Originals. In September 2023, due to cuts in spending on original programming and removing series that were unsuccessful upon launch as well as the 2023 Writers Guild of America and SAG-AFTRA strikes in Hollywood, it was announced that the series, along with several other original titles, was removed from The Roku Channel.

On May 18, 2023, The CW announced it had picked up the series for U.S. linear broadcast; it premiered on July 24. Season 2 premiered on September 11. On December 12, The CW announced that it had acquired the third season, the first to air exclusively on the network following its removal from The Roku Channel. Season 3 premiered on January 11, 2024. Season 4 premiered on November 29, 2024.
