= Mark Montefiore =

Canadian film and television producer

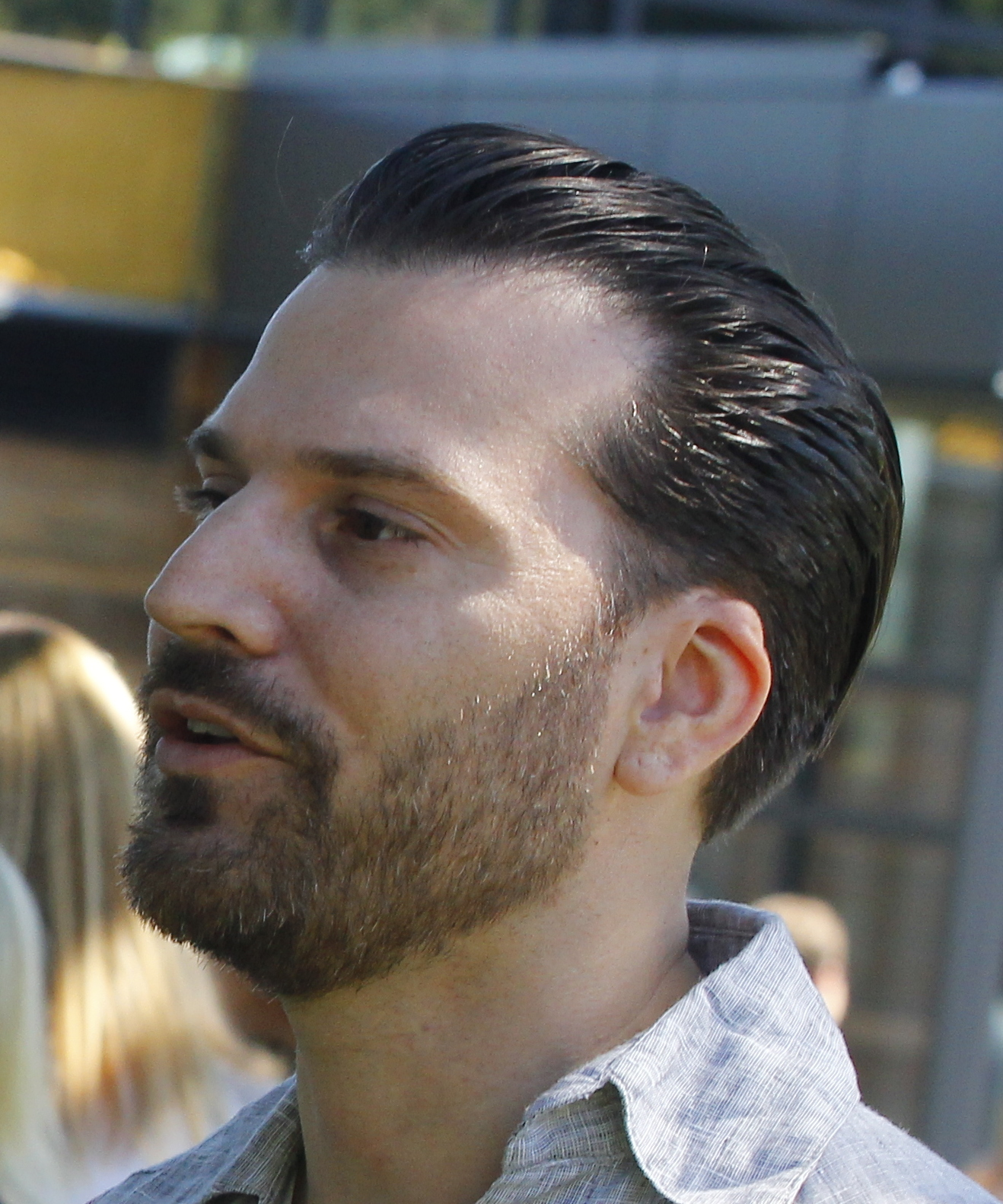
- Born: St. Catharines, Ontario
- Occupations: film and television producer
- Years active: 2000s-present
- Notable work: Letterkenny, Shoresy, Children Ruin Everything

Mark Montefiore is a Canadian film and television producer, most noted as the founder and president of New Metric Media.

Originally from St. Catharines, Ontario, he studied in the broadcasting program at Niagara College; initially his goal was to become an actor, but through the program he discovered a passion and skill for production. He worked principally as a film producer for the first decade of his career, most notably on The Armoire and Cas and Dylan. He was a partner with Vivieno Caldinelli in the short-lived Polenta Productions studio in the 2000s.

He launched New Metric Media in 2013 to produce television series. The company's productions have included Letterkenny, What Would Sal Do?, Bad Blood, Children Ruin Everything, Shoresy, and Bria Mack Gets a Life.
