= Jennica Harper =

Canadian television writer and producer

Jennica Harper is a Canadian television writer and producer, most noted as a WGC Screenwriting Award winner and two-time Canadian Screen Award nominee for her work on the television sitcom Jann.

She won the WGC award in 2020 for the episode "The Big House". She was also a WGC winner in the Tweens and Teens category in 2016 for the Some Assembly Required episode "Rocket with a Pocket".

At the Canadian Screen Awards, she was a nominee for Best Writing in a Comedy Series at the 9th Canadian Screen Awards in 2021 for "What Did Jann Do", and at the 10th Canadian Screen Awards in 2022 for "No Drama". She also previously received a nomination for Best Writing in a Dramatic Program or Limited Series at the 7th Canadian Screen Awards in 2019 for Cardinal.

She has also published four books of poetry. Her collection Wood was shortlisted for the Dorothy Livesay Poetry Prize in 2014, and Bounce House was a finalist for the ReLit Awards in 2020. Her other poetry collections were The Octopus and Other Poems (2006) and What It Feels Like for a Girl (2008). She is also known for "The Sally Draper Poems", a poetry sequence she wrote in the character of Sally Draper from the television series Mad Men for the literary magazine Numéro Cinq.

Harper was born in North Bay, Ontario, and raised in Brampton. She is an alumna of the creative writing program at the University of British Columbia.
