= Ivan Fecan =

Canadian media executive

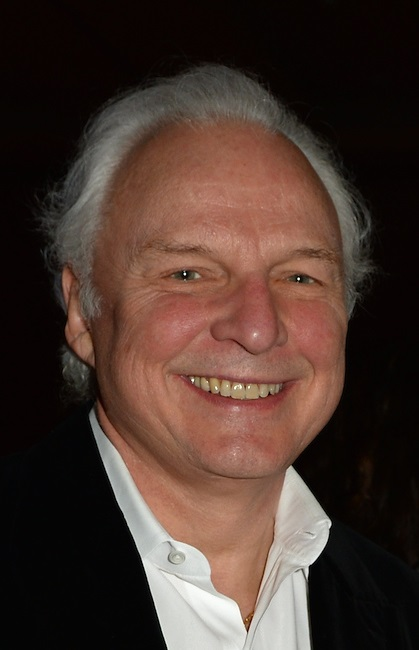
- Fecan in 2019
- Born: 1954 (age 71–72); Toronto, Ontario, Canada
- Education: York University

Ivan Fecan /ˈfɛtsæn/ is a Canadian media executive producer and philanthropist. Fecan was the president and chief executive officer of Baton Broadcasting and its successor CTVglobemedia from 1996 to 2011, and chief executive officer of the CTV Television Network from late 1998 to 2011.

== Early life and education ==
Fecan was born in Toronto, Ontario in 1954. He attended York University, receiving a BA in Fine Arts.

== Career ==
In 1984, at the age of 31, Fecan was offered a job with NBC. He served as their vice-president of creative development for two years, before returning to Canada to become director of television programming for CBC Television in 1987. Some of the shows that Fecan ushered in during his tenure at CBC include Degrassi High, Road to Avonlea, The Kids in the Hall, Royal Canadian Air Farce and This Hour Has 22 Minutes.

Fecan left CBC and joined Baton Broadcasting in January 1994 as senior group vice-president, and became executive vice-president and chief operating officer in January 1995. Fecan became president and chief executive officer of Baton in 1996. Fecan built Baton into a cross-Canada broadcasting powerhouse by purchasing or launching CTV affiliates in nearly every major market in the country (thus enabling itself to be renamed CTV Inc.) The new CTV organization in 1999 purchased Netstar Communications, owners of TSN. This made CTV an important player in Canada's cable television industry.

In 2000, CTV was purchased by Bell Canada Enterprises, which promptly merged CTV with The Globe and Mail to form Bell Globemedia, later renamed CTVglobemedia, of which Fecan became president and chief executive officer. Although Bell Canada Enterprises sold its controlling interest in the company in 2006, it then bought out the company's broadcasting assets entirely in 2011, at which point Fecan exited. He is now an investor and executive chair of Thunderbird Films. He is also the producer and executive producer of the hit Canadian sitcom Kim's Convenience. On September 5, 2017, Fecan was appointed Interim chief executive officer of Thunderbird, in addition to his other roles there.

Fecan sits on charitable boards at the Art Gallery of Ontario, Toronto General and Western Hospital Foundation, Maple Leaf Sports and Entertainment and the Royal Conservatory of Music Advisory Council.

With his wife Sandra Faire, he has made major philanthropic gifts to the Art Gallery of Ontario, Four Seasons Centre, National Ballet of Canada, Canada's National Ballet School, Soulpepper Theatre Company, UHN- Toronto General Hospital, and York University. Faire died on February 27, 2019, at her home in Toronto. Fecan has remarried to Jae Kim.

== Achievements ==
Fecan is the recipient of the American Marketing Association Hall of Legends. Fecan was named person of the year by entertainment industry magazine Playback in 2006, person of the decade in 2011, and inducted into the Playback Hall of Fame in May 2016.
