= Ben Feigin =

American film and television producer (died 2022)

- Born: September 11, 1975; Silver Spring, Maryland, U.S.
- Died: October 24, 2022 (aged 47); Los Angeles, California, U.S.
- Occupation: Producer
- Notable work: Schitt's Creek
- Spouse: Heidi Feigin

Ben Feigin (September 11, 1975 – October 24, 2022) was an American television producer. Born in Silver Spring, Maryland, he was an executive producer of Schitt's Creek, for which he won a Primetime Emmy Award for Outstanding Comedy Series in 2020. He shared the award with other producers of the show, including Eugene Levy and Dan Levy. Feigin attended the University of California, Santa Barbara. He died from pancreatic cancer on October 24, 2022, at the age of 47.
