= George Brown Theatre School =

Coordinates: 43.65127°N 79.37025°W

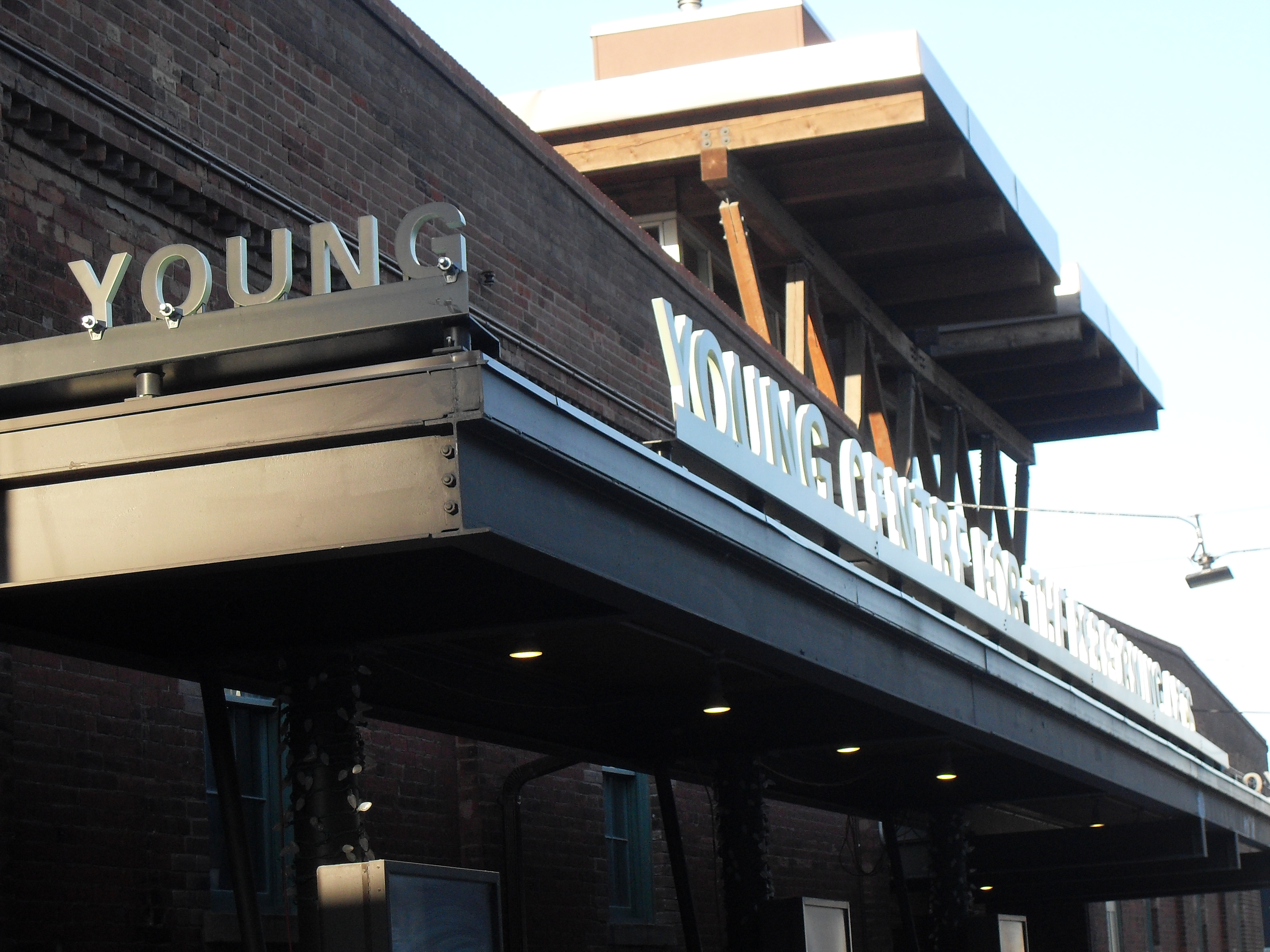
- The Young Centre for the Performing Arts, where the school is located.
- Type: Drama school
- Established: 1976; 50 years ago
- Parent institution: George Brown Polytechnic
- Chairperson: Trent Scherer
- Coordinator: Sue Miner
- Location: Toronto, Ontario, Canada
- Campus: Urban
- Website: www.georgebrown.ca

The George Brown Theatre School is a drama school in Toronto, Canada. Providing training in multiple forms and practices of theatre, it is one of the highest-regarded conservatory schools for drama in the country. The school was founded in 1976 as an affiliate of George Brown College, which is also based in Toronto.

The George Brown Theatre School is often cited as one of the best theatre schools in Canada. It is known for training actors and theatre artists who graduate with varied experience from many instructors, guest teachers, and guest directors. Furthermore, it has earned a national reputation for the high-calibre work of its graduates, many of whom have earned accolades and built successful careers in theatre, film, television, and other entertainment industries.

== History ==
George Brown College began offering several theatre arts courses in theatre, music, and dance in 1973 as part-time electives for its general student populous. In an effort to bring more cohesion to the College's performing arts division, Dean of Academic Studies Bradley Webb, along with the artistic leadership of veteran actor and director Joseph Shaw, founded the George Brown Theatre School in 1976. The school began classes in September 1976 as a two-year, 20-student program housed at the College's Kensington Campus with a focus on both theatre performance and production. It moved and expanded in the following year with the acquisition of a performance space at 530 King Street East while training continued at the College's Casa Loma campus.

Upon Shaw's retirement in 1986, Heinar Piller became Artistic Director of the school. Piller engaged Peter C. Wylde as Head of Acting and under their leadership, the program was expanded from two to three years. The curriculum was redesigned with a focus on classical text and expanded performance elements to showcase its graduating students, including the addition of a children's theatre show performed by second-year students.

Following Piller's retirement in 1997, Paul Lampert served as Artistic Director of the school for three years. During this time, the school expanded its training by launching the one-year Introduction to Performing Arts Careers (IPAC) program.

James Simon took over as Artistic Director in 2000. In December of that year, Paul Carder, the College's then Dean of Business and Creative Arts, approached Albert Schultz, then Artistic Director of the Soulpepper Theatre Company, about creating a formal partnership between the company and the George Brown Theatre School. This eventually led to the creation of the Young Centre for the Performing Arts, a professional performance facility located in Toronto's Distillery District where both the school and Soulpepper are now located. Classes officially began at the Young Centre on September 6, 2005.

In January 2018, the Toronto Star, CBC, and the Dialog published articles describing bullying, discrimination, harassment, and abuse perpetrated by a George Brown Theatre School faculty member against students. The incidents reported by former students were said to have taken place between 2000 and 2015. According to the articles, allegations of abuse were reported to George Brown College and the George Brown Theatre School administrations by former students in 2007 and as early as 2000. In 2017, additional reports cited acting professor Todd Hammond as the primary perpetrator of abuse, resulting in his leave of absence. He was removed from the theatre school's faculty directory in 2018 and was no longer paid or employed by the College by 2020.

The school has since undergone several changes in response to the publications, namely the hiring of new acting professors, changes in faculty, and the succession of Sue Miner as Program Coordinator after James Simon.

== Location ==
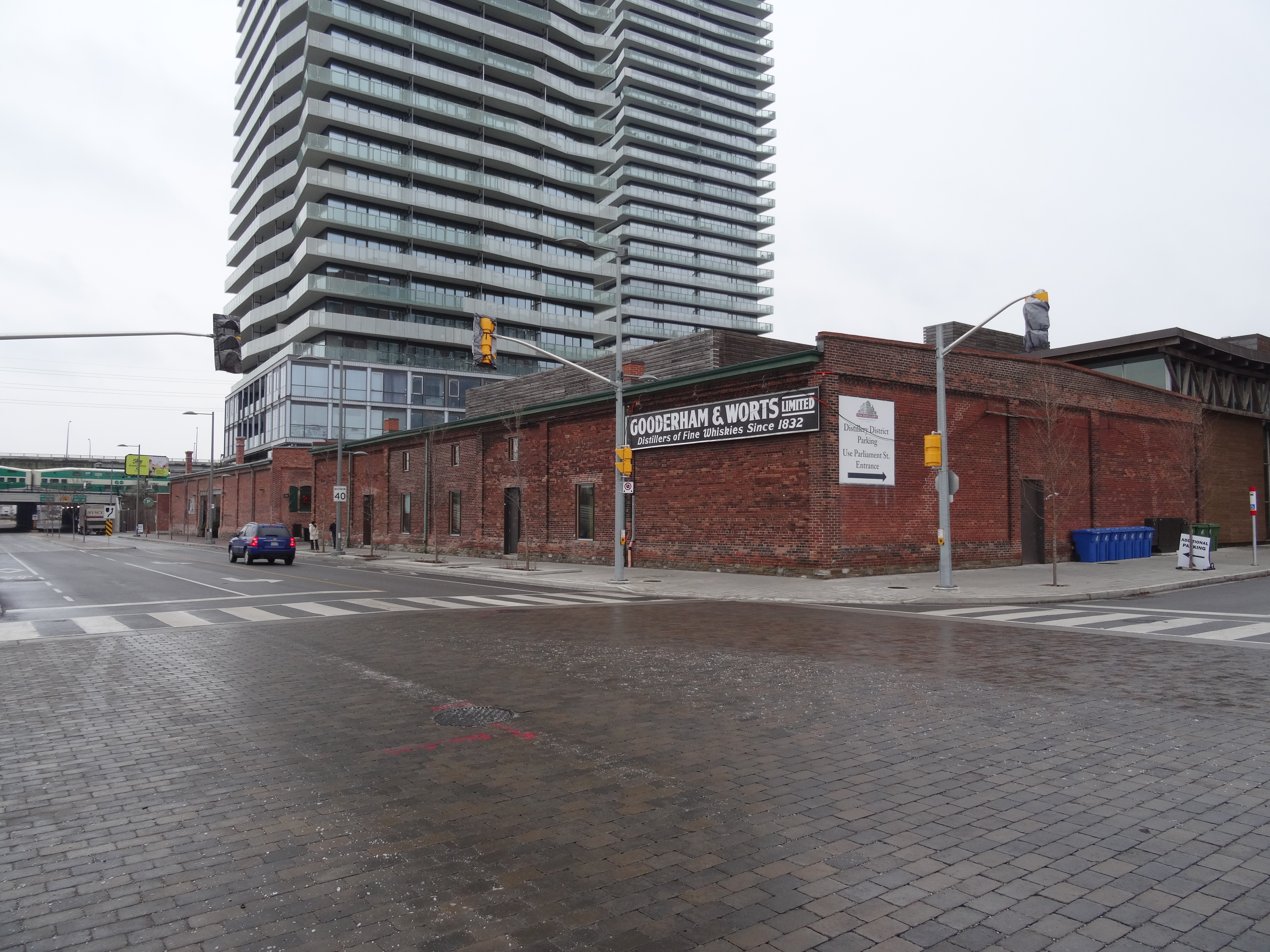
The student entrance side of the school as seen from Cherry Street.

In November 2001, the Distillery Historic District Project was announced as a new Toronto attraction. The partnership of the George Brown Theatre School and Soulpepper immediately began negotiations with the Cityscape Development group to take possession of Tank Houses 9 and 10, creating what became the Young Centre for the Performing Arts. The vision of this partnership was to create a performing arts, education and community outreach facility and home to the school, Soulpepper, and Toronto’s independent arts community.

=== Young Centre for the Performing Arts ===
In 2002, the architectural firm of Kuwabara Payne McKenna Blumberg Architects was hired to design the centre with Thomas Payne as the principal architect. The design offered three professional theatres, four rehearsal studios, two classrooms, a costume shop, a student lounge, artist garden, public lobby, cafe, and administration offices for the theatre school and Soulpepper. George Brown and Soulpepper each raised half of the $14 million cost in addition to a $3 million gift from the Michael Young Family Foundation in 2003 which secured funding for its development.

The George Brown Theatre School, which operates in a 9080 ft^{2} area of the building, began classes at the partially-completed centre in September 2005 prior to the Young Centre's official opening on January 15, 2006.

=== Theatres ===
The theatre school regularly performs in three theatres in the Young Centre. The Marilyn and Charles Baillie Theatre, the largest of the three, is a flexible space that seats up to 378 patrons and is host to the second-year children's show. The graduating class' season, meanwhile, alternates between the Michael Young Theatre, which seats a maximum of 269 patrons, and the black box Tank House Theatre, which has a capacity of 110.

== Admissions and graduation rates ==
=== Admissions ===
The George Brown Theatre School is a highly competitive program which only accepts 30 to 32 students each year into its three-year advanced diploma program out of 650 to 700 applicants. Admission is based predominantly on the success of a 3-stage audition process: an initial first round of performance auditions — in which candidates are requested to perform a contemporary monologue, a classical monologue, and an a cappella song — a second round of callback auditions, and a third round of interviews. Auditions are held in-person in April and May of each year in Toronto, as well as via Skype if necessary for candidates unable to travel for the audition.

=== Graduation rates ===
Although up to 32 students are admitted into the school in first year, a typical graduating class has about 14 to 19 students. Similarly, a typical second-year cohort has, on average, 19 students. However, in 2021, 25 students graduated — one of the largest classes in recent history.

== Curriculum ==
The George Brown Theatre School is a conservatory-based institution. Its primary curriculum is built on a classical approach to acting through voice, movement, speech, dance, and music classes, which students are required to take throughout the entire three-year advanced diploma program. Students learn a wide range of acting styles through these classes as well as through other required courses including stage combat, improvisation, neutral mask, character mask, clowning, commedia dell'arte, storytelling, film and television technique, and various classical and contemporary scene studies. In addition to this, students take courses in text analysis, contact improvisation, dialectology, audition technique, theatre history, the business of acting, and the Alexander technique. The program is intensive, sometimes requiring students to train for upwards of 11 hours on a single day.

Students also participate in five full-scale productions throughout their three years of training. Third-year students work with professional directors, stage managers, designers, and technicians to produce a full season of plays performed at the Young Centre for the Performing Arts. Additionally, second-year students devise and present a children's theatre show each November and December based on the stories of children’s author Robert Munsch.

In addition to training and performances, the school provides a mentorship program in which third-year students are individually paired with a successful theatre practitioner who mentors each student for a year after graduation. Third-year students are also offered three-week-long workshops in motion capture and voice-over work at the school.

Beyond its three-year program, the George Brown Theatre School offers a one-year certificate program known as the Preparation Program (formerly the Introduction to Performing Arts Careers program). This program is designed for students wishing to obtain basic skills needed to enter into theatre schools or the entertainment business. Graduates of the preparation program often successfully audition into the school's three-year performance program.

== Notable alumni ==
Notable George Brown Theatre School alumni include:

- Hannah Emily Anderson — (Jigsaw, What Keeps You Alive)
- Keith Barker — (Native Earth Performing Arts)
- Katherine Barrell — (Wynonna Earp, Workin' Moms)
- Samantha Bee — (Full Frontal with Samantha Bee)
- Shaun Benson — (The Girlfriend Experience, Being Erica)
- Ryder Britton — (Degrassi: The Next Generation, Mantracker)
- Catherine Bruhier — (The Young and The Restless)
- Kristian Bruun — (Orphan Black, Carter, Tactical Girls)
- Valerie Buhagiar — (Roadkill, A Winter Tale)
- Evan Buliung — (Dear Evan Hansen, Shaw Festival, Stratford Festival)
- Ben Carlson — (Stratford Festival, Hamlet, The Taming of the Shrew)
- Philip DeWilde — (Turning Paige, Prince Charming)
- Steffi DiDomenicantonio — (Spring Awakening, Come from Away)
- Karen Dwyer — (Better Than Chocolate, Superstar)
- TL Forsberg — (Switched at Birth)
- Brendan Gall — (Blindspot, Open Heart, The L.A. Complex)
- Soo Garay — (My Children! My Africa!, Queer as Folk)
- Colton Gobbo — (Ginny and Georgia, Son of a Critch, The Desperate Hour)
- Brad Goreski — (E! Fashion Police)
- Carter Hayden — (Total Drama, Camp Lakebottom)
- Falen Johnson — (Soulpepper, Secret Life of Canada)
- Emmanuel Kabongo — (Teenagers, 21 Thunder)
- Patrick Kwok-Choon — (Open Heart, Star Trek: Discovery)
- Daniel MacIvor — (Twitch City, Marion Bridge)
- Colm Magner — (Street Time, This Is Wonderland)
- Michael Mahonen — (Road to Avonlea, Star Trek: Voyager)
- Sarah Manninen — (Murdoch Mysteries, Alias Grace)
- Meredith McGeachie — (Punch, The L Word, Paradise Falls)
- Claudette Mink — (24, R.L. Stine's The Haunting Hour, Harper's Island)
- Paul O'Sullivan — (George Shrinks, Grossology, Friends and Heroes)
- Alex Paxton-Beesley — (Murdoch Mysteries, Cardinal, Pure)
- Aaron Poole — (This Beautiful City, Strange Empire)
- Andra Simons — (The Joshua Tales, Turtlemen)
- Janaya Stephens — (Left Behind series, Inside the Osmonds, Flashpoint)
- Ordena Stephens-Thompson — (Da Kink in My Hair)
- Dylan Taylor — (Defying Gravity, Pure, What Would Sal Do?)
