= Rob Blackie (producer) =

Rob Blackie is a Canadian film and television producer, who has been a partner with his brother Peter in the Newfoundland and Labrador-based studio Take the Shot Productions.

Originally from Gander, he got involved in amateur filmmaking through the Atlantic Filmmakers Cooperative while attending law school at Dalhousie University, and began working professionally in the film industry after his graduation. He then attended film school at Columbia University before returning to Newfoundland.

His credits as a producer have included the television series Republic of Doyle, Frontier, Caught, Little Dog, Astrid and Lilly Save the World, SurrealEstate and Son of a Critch, and the theatrical feature films Love and Savagery, Cast No Shadow and Blueberry Grunt.

== Awards ==
Award	Date of ceremony	Category	Work	Result	Ref.
Gemini Awards	2010	Best Dramatic Series	Republic of Doyle with John Vatcher, Allan Hawco, Michael Levine	Nominated	
Directors Guild of Canada	2010	Best Short Film	Quiet at Dawn	Won	
Canadian Screen Awards	2019	Best Limited Series or Program	Caught with Peter Blackie, Michael Levine, John Vatcher, Perry Chafe, Alex Patrick, Allan Hawco	Nominated	
Canadian Screen Awards	2023	Best Comedy Series	Astrid and Lilly Save the World with Betsy Van Stone, Noelle Stehman, Lance Samuels, Daniel Iron, Armand Leo, Danishka Esterhazy, Neil Tabatznik, Samantha Levine, Peter Blackie, John Vatcher	Nominated	
Canadian Screen Awards	2024	Best Comedy Series	Son of a Critch with Mark Critch, Tim McAuliffe, Andrew Barnsley, Allan Hawco, Ben Murray, Perry Chafe, John Vatcher, Amanda Joy	Nominated	
