= Sophia Powers =

Canadian-American actress

- Born: July 22, 2009 (age 16); North Vancouver, British Columbia, Canada
- Occupation: Actress
- Years active: 2022–present

Sophia Powers is a Canadian-American actress; she is best known for playing Jennifer Fox in the Canadian Broadcasting Corporation sitcom Son of a Critch.

== Personal life ==
Powers was born in North Vancouver, British Columbia. She first started taking acting classes when she was eight years old.

== Career ==
Since 2022, Powers has starred as Fox in the CBC comedy series Son of a Critch, based on the memoir by Mark Critch.

In 2023, Powers appeared in the television film Unexpected Grace. She played Toni, who is the daughter of Erica Durance's character. Later that same year, Powers played Keira Allen in the television film Fourth Down and Love, which premiered on Hallmark Channel on September 9, 2023.

== Filmography ==
| Year | Title | Role | Notes |
|---|---|---|---|
| 2022 | It's A Beautiful Day | Chloe | Short film |
| 2022–present | Son of a Critch | Fox | Main role |
| 2023 | Unexpected Grace | Toni | TV movie |
| 2023 | Fourth Down and Love | Keira Allen | TV movie |

== Awards and nominations ==
| Year | Award | Category | Nominated work | Result | Ref. |
|---|---|---|---|---|---|
| 2023 | Leo Awards | Best Performance in a Music, Comedy or Variety Program or Series | Son of a Critch (episode: "Feast or Famine") | Nominated | |
| 2023 | Leo Awards | Best Youth Performance | Son of a Critch (episode: "Feast or Famine") | Nominated | |
| 2023 | Young Artist Awards | Outstanding Ensemble (shared with Benjamin Evan Ainsworth and Mark Rivera) | Son of a Critch | Nominated | |
