= Free Beer (comedic musical duo) =

Free Beer was a Canadian comedic musical duo, consisting of Newfoundland entertainer Kevin Blackmore and Lorne Elliott, who hails from Montreal.

== History ==
The duo was formed in 1979, and toured throughout eastern Canada, from Newfoundland to Montreal, performing in bars and on university campuses.

Among their comedic performances was an operatic arrangement of "I'se the Bye".

The pair separated in 1982. Blackmore soon established a new group, Buddy Wasisname and the Other Fellers, performing Newfoundland music and comedy.

Lorne Elliott became the lead performer in CBC's comedy show Madly Off in All Directions.

== Discography ==
=== Albums ===
- Clueless (1982)
