= Rob Blackie =

Rob Blackie may refer to:

- Rob Blackie (politician), a British political campaigner and candidate,
- Rob Blackie (producer), a Canadian film and television producer.
