= Perry Chafe =

Canadian television writer, producer and bestselling author

- Chafe in 2026
- Born: Perry Lawrence Chafe; February 9, 1969 (age 57); Petty Harbour, Newfoundland and Labrador
- Education: Memorial University of Newfoundland and Labrador
- Known for: Film and television producer, screenwriter, author, songwriter
- Notable work: Below, Republic of Doyle, Saint-Pierre, Son of a Critch, Closer By Sea
- Partner: Maureen Ennis

Perry Lawrence Chafe (born February 9, 1969) is a Canadian television writer, producer, and bestselling author, best known for co-creating the television series Republic of Doyle and Saint-Pierre.

== Early life ==
Perry Chafe was born and raised in Petty Harbour, Newfoundland and Labrador. He received a bachelor of arts from Memorial University of Newfoundland in 1992.

== Career ==
In 2009, Chafe co-founded Take the Shot Productions, a film and television-based production company. Chafe was the co-showrunner and head writer for the TV series Republic of Doyle, a show he created with Allan Hawco and Malcolm MacRury.

Chafe was also an executive producer and writer for the Netflix and Discovery Canada series Frontier, starring Jason Momoa. In addition, Chafe was an executive producer and writer for Caught, a CBC limited series based on Lisa Moore's award-winning novel of the same name.

In 2021, Chafe began working as a writer and producer on the CBC series Son of a Critch, based on the best-selling memoir from Mark Critch. The show stars Malcolm McDowell, Benjamin Evan Ainsworth, Claire Rankin, and Mark Critch.

Chafe is the partner of Maureen Ennis of the Juno and SOCAN award winning musical group The Ennis Sisters, with whom he has cowritten songs including "Shine Your Light" which was part of a campaign to promote mental health and wellness for the Canadian Mental Health Association of Newfoundland and Labrador. The duo was also commissioned to write the song "Dream On" for the internationally acclaimed Lady Cove Women's Choir in 2021, as well as the song "Forever Far From Home" for a special Come Home Year Remembrance Day ceremony in 2022.

In May 2023, Chafe released his debut novel, Closer By Sea, published by Scribner Canada and Simon & Schuster. The novel became an instant national bestseller. A German-language edition, titled Sommer auf Perigo Island, is scheduled for publication in February 2026 by Mare Verlag in Germany.

On May 23, 2024, CBC announced a 10-episode order for Saint-Pierre, an hour-long procedural series co-created by Chafe. The series premiered as part of CBC's 2025 winter lineup. Chafe served as executive producer and senior writer. Filming on the second season wrapped in November 2025.

Filming took place in the summer of 2025 for Below, a six-part Netflix horror series set in Newfoundland and centred on a mysterious sea creature. Created by Jesse McKeown, the series premiered on October 8th, 2026, with Chafe serving as a writer and co-executive producer.

== Film and television ==
Year	Title	Role	Notes
2010–2014	Republic of Doyle	Co-creator, executive producer, writer	Six seasons
2016–2018	Frontier	Executive producer, writer	Three seasons
2018	Caught	Executive producer, writer	One season
2022–	Son of a Critch	Executive producer, writer	Five Seasons
2024–	Saint-Pierre	Co-creator, executive producer, writer	Two seasons
2026	Below	Senior writer, co-executive producer	Six-part series

== Novels ==
Year	Title	Publisher
2023	Closer By Sea	Scribner Canada / Simon & Schuster
2026	Sommer auf Perigo Island	German-language edition

== Awards ==
Award	Year	Category	Film/TV Show	Result	Ref
Canadian Screen Awards	2019	Best Limited Series or Program	Caught	Nominated	
Canadian Screen Awards	2023	Cogeco Audience Choice Award	Son of a Critch	Nominated	
Canadian Screen Awards	2024	Best Comedy Series	Son of a Critch	Nominated	
Canadian Screen Awards	2024	Cogeco Audience Choice Award	Son of a Critch	Won	
