= Free Beer (disambiguation) =

Free beer may refer to:

- Free Beer, an open source beer formerly known as Vores Øl, Danish for Our Beer
- Gregg "Free Beer" Daniels, the radio talk show host from The Free Beer and Hot Wings Show
- Free Beer (comedic musical duo), the former Canadian comedic musical duo
- A former San Francisco skate punk band with member Tommy Guerrero

== See also ==
- Free as in free beer, the distinction between "free as in free beer" (things) and "free as in free speech" (ideas), as famously defined by Richard Stallman in his essay "The Free Software Definition" (see also free software movement).
