= Kevin Blackmore =

Kevin Blackmore CM
- Also known as: Buddy Wasisname
- Born: 1955 (age 70–71); Gander, Newfoundland and Labrador, Canada
- Genres: Folk music, Country music, Comedy music
- Occupations: singer, songwriter, comedian
- Years active: 1979–present
- Website: buddywasisname.com

Kevin Luke Blackmore, CM who performs under the stage name Buddy Wasisname, is a Canadian singer, songwriter, comedian, and dramatist from Newfoundland and Labrador, Canada. Blackmore is best known as leader of the band Buddy Wasisname and the Other Fellers, who perform mainly Newfoundland music and comedy.

== Early life ==
Blackmore grew up in Gander, Newfoundland. He studied piano and classical guitar, and after graduating from high school he attended trade school.

== Career ==
As a young man, Blackmore worked as an auto mechanic and heavy machinery operator, and later a piano tuner. He started his musical career in 1979 as a part of the comedic musical duo, Free Beer, together with Montreal native Lorne Elliott.

Blackmore and Elliott went their separate ways in 1982, and Blackmore settled in Glovertown. In 1983 Blackmore, together with Wayne Chaulk and Ray Johnson, formed the band Buddy Wasisname and the Other Fellers, singing and playing mandolin, fiddle and guitar. The group played mainly Newfoundland-related music and performed comedy sketches.

Blackmore, as Buddy Wasisname, performed with the Other Fellers for 35 years, contributing to many concert tours and to 19 albums of recorded music and comedy.

When not touring or recording, Blackmore continues to live in Glovertown, and participates in community events and fundraisers. He was appointed to the Order of Canada in 2022.
