= Andra Simons =

Bermudian writer, director and actor

Andra Simons is a Bermudian writer, director and actor now residing in London.

== Biography ==
Born in Bermuda, Simons graduated from George Brown Theatre School in Toronto, Ontario, Canada. He was well known in the spoken-word movement in Toronto, notably for his collaboration with Sandra Alland in the performance poetry-music band Stumblin' Tongues. In 1997, Simons returned to Bermuda, where in 1999 he co-founded Waterspout Theatre company. He settled in the UK in 2004, and now focuses on poetry and performance.

His first volume, The Joshua Tales, was published by Treehouse Press in 2009, and features collagraphs by Kendra Ezekiel. The work describes the relationship between a poet and another figure, Joshua, who can be seen as a little boy or the poet's shadow, and is set on the fictional island of Pocaroja.

Simons was selected to represent Bermuda in "Poetry Parnassus", an international gathering of poets at London's Southbank Centre in June 2012, featuring one poet from each of the 204 nations competing in the 2012 Summer Olympics.

== Works ==
- Turtlemen, London and Isle of Wight: Copy Press, 2021
- The Joshua Tales, London: Treehouse Press, 2009
- Some Poems by People I Like (editor Sandra Alland), Toronto: sandraslittlebookshop, 2007
- Partings (with Sandra Alland), Toronto: Stumblin' Tongues, 1998
