= Astrid & Lilly Save the World =

Canadian television series

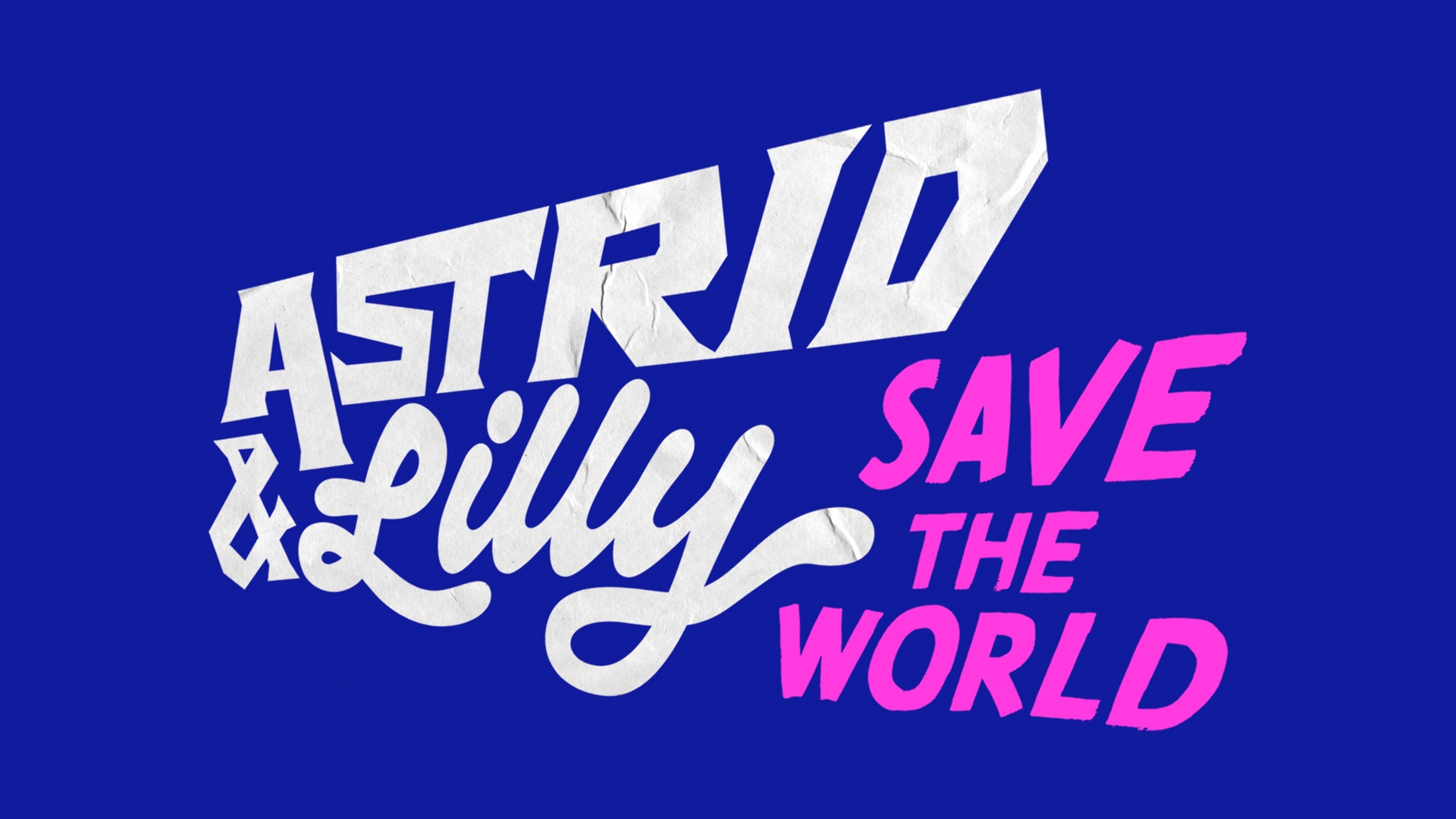
- Genre: Comedy drama; Supernatural; Teen drama
- Created by: Noelle Stehman; Betsy Van Stone
- Country of origin: Canada
- Original language: English
- No. of seasons: 1
- No. of episodes: 10

Production
- Executive producers: Noelle Stehman; Betsy Van Stone; Lance Samuels; Daniel Iron; Armand Leo; Danishka Esterhazy
- Producers: Samantha Levine; Peter Blackie; Rob Blackie
- Production companies: Mini High Five Productions; Take the Shot Productions; Blue Ice Pictures; Bell Media; STX Television

Original release
- Network: CTV Sci-Fi Channel
- Release: January 26 – March 30, 2022

Astrid and Lilly Save the World is a Canadian supernatural teen comedy-drama television series. It premiered on January 26, 2022.

The series centres on Astrid (Jana Morrison) and Lilly (Samantha Aucoin), two high school outcasts who unexpectedly open a portal to another dimension, and must battle monsters to save the world.

Produced by Blue Ice Pictures, the series aired on CTV Sci-Fi Channel in Canada, Syfy in the United States, and was released on ITVX in the United Kingdom in late 2022. It is also available for streaming on Tubi in the United States and Crave in Canada.

== Plot ==
"High school is hard enough when you're different, but when outcast BFFs Astrid (Jana Morrison) and Lilly (Samantha Aucoin) accidentally crack open a portal to a terrifyingly quirky monster dimension, it gets a lot more complicated. It's up to them to vanquish the creepy creatures and save the world, becoming the badass heroes they were meant to be. That is, if they can survive the horrors of high school."

== Cast and characters ==
=== Main ===
- Jana Morrison as Astrid Bell: Feisty, a bit edgy and intelligent, but not above an obsessive crush. Astrid spends all her time with Lilly imagining themselves as "Olivia Benson types" while they spy on their classmates and collect data about what cool kids are into. A high school junior, Astrid's unshakeable belief in herself and Lilly gives the pair the confidence they need.
- Samantha Aucoin as Lilly Fortenberry: She provides the counter-balance to Astrid. Lilly lives with her supportive moms and condescending "well-connected" younger sister. Sweet natured and timid, Lilly shares Astrid's passion for sleuthing and adventure, but she hasn't quite figured out who she is and what she wants.
- Olivier Renaud as Brutus: Arriving through an inter-dimensional portal, the hunky, face-horned Brutus introduces and appoints himself as Astrid and Lilly's guide & trainer for all things relating to monsters. His origins and intentions are unclear, but he seems extremely interested in '90s pop culture and testing the girl's monster hunting abilities.
- Geri Hall as Christine Powell: An unstoppable force, Candace's over-protective religious mom Christine steamrolls over everyone- from her own daughter to teachers with questionable motives.
- Julia Doyle as Candace Powell: Effortlessly popular, Candace is the head mean girl at Pine Academy and Lilly's former best friend. Everything seems to come easy for Candace, but she seems to have more secrets than people realize.
- Kolton Stewart as Tate Hudson: A soccer jock, Tate is the hottest boy in school. He and his girlfriend Candace are King and Queen of Pine Academy but he also has a challenging relationship with his father.
- Spencer MacPherson as Sparrow Donovan: A dreamy, smirky, brooding alt kid. Sparrow comes across as an aloof bad boy but Astrid is determined to break through his steely exterior.
- Christina Orjalo as Valerie Long: The ultimate theatre kid, Val's obsession with becoming a star is all she cares about. A bridge between the cool kids and Astrid & Lilly.
- Michael McCreary as Egon "Eggs" Walczak: A brilliant and inquisitive nerd on the spectrum. Smart and insightful, Eggs always has a fact to share regardless of its level of appropriateness.
- Megan Hutchings as Michelle Knight: Conceited and insecure, she is vice principal of Pine Academy, and serves various roles at the school like social director, coach, and drama teacher.

=== Guest ===
- Sheila McCarthy as Razor: a terrifying monster with 23,371 teeth and a taste for testosterone.

== Production ==
NBCUniversal announced the series during the upfronts in May 2021. Casting was reported by Deadline on August 31, 2021.

The series was shot on location in St. John's, Newfoundland during the fall of 2021. The production hired women and non-binary people in nearly every key creative position, including every single writer and director.

In January 2023, Syfy confirmed that the series had been canceled after one season.

== Episodes ==
| No. | Title | Directed by | Written by | Original release date | USA viewers |
|---|---|---|---|---|---|
| 1 | "Tontoom" | Jill Carter | Betsy Van Stone & Noelle Stehman | January 26, 2022 | 363,000 |
Astrid and Lilly accidentally open a portal to another dimension and become monster hunters to save humanity.
| 2 | "Teeth" | Jill Carter | Betsy Van Stone & Noelle Stehman | February 2, 2022 | 252,000 |
A monster attacks bullies at school. Will Astrid and Lilly decide to join her or defeat her?
| 3 | "Amygdala" | J Stevens | Alexandra Mircheff | February 9, 2022 | 267,000 |
A monster manifesting everyone's worst fear terrorizes Pine Academy, including Astrid and Lilly.
| 4 | "One Rib" | J Stevens | Veronika Paz | February 16, 2022 | 217,000 |
Everyone does a new "viral" dance. Astrid and Lilly feel excluded — until they learn it's a monster.
| 5 | "A-borg" | Audrey Cummings | Alix Markman | February 23, 2022 | 246,000 |
A haunting monster forces everyone to relive their worst childhood memory.
| 6 | "Toenail" | Audrey Cummings | Veronika Paz | March 2, 2022 | 225,000 |
Principal Varshidi gets possessed with a demonic ego, and Astrid and Lilly must perform the exorcism.
| 7 | "Lips" | Danishka Esterhazy | Alexandra Mircheff | March 9, 2022 | 234,000 |
When a sexy new monster comes to town, passion runs high...and deadly.
| 8 | "Hair" | Danishka Esterhazy | Noelle Stehman & Betsy Van Stone | March 16, 2022 | 221,000 |
Lilly has detention and has to deal with a nightmare monster, but is fighting with Astrid even scarier?
| 9 | "Doppelkopfel" | Jordan Canning | Alix Markman | March 23, 2022 | 170,000 |
It's double trouble when a doppelganger monster arrives on the day of the school play.
| 10 | "Guts" | Jordan Canning | Noelle Stehman & Betsy Van Stone | March 30, 2022 | 204,000 |
Astrid and Lilly finally go head-to-head with the big bad. Can they actually save the world?

== Reception ==
Astrid and Lilly Save the World has been positively received by critics. Time described the series as "Buffy minus the male gaze." Angie Han of The Hollywood Reporter wrote that Astrid & Lilly has a "charm all its own — not as a copy of what's come before it, but as a worthy successor", and praised the show's dialogue, humor, and chemistry between the leads. Bleeding Cool called Astrid & Lilly "a unique and heartfelt story" and praised the show for its "engaging and often hilarious depiction of mixing high school and monster-hunting". Buzzfeed, Polygon, Cosmopolitan, CBC News, and Screen Rant all declared Astrid & Lilly one of the most highly anticipated series of 2022.

Multiple critics have favorably compared the series to Buffy the Vampire Slayer. In homage to Buffy, Brutus introduces himself in the first episode as "your Giles, in terms you humans might understand." The show has also been positively compared to a number of acclaimed teen films and TV series including Booksmart, Sex Education, and PEN15.

=== Awards and nominations ===
| Year | Award | Category | Nominee | Result | Ref. |
|---|---|---|---|---|---|
| 2023 | Canadian Screen Awards | Best Comedy Series | Betsy Van Stone, Noelle Stehman, Lance Samuels, Daniel Iron, Armand Leo, Danishka Esterhazy, Neil Tabatznik, Samantha Levine, Rob Blackie, Peter Blackie, John Vatcher | Nominated | |
| 2023 | Canadian Screen Awards | Best Original Music, Comedy | Ames Bessada (Episode 101, "Tontoom") | Nominated | |
| 2023 | Writers Guild of Canada (WGC) Screenwriting Awards | Best Writing, Teens & Tweens | Veronika Paz (Episode 104, "One Rib") | Won | |
| 2023 | Writers Guild of Canada (WGC) Screenwriting Awards | Best Writing, Teens & Tweens | Alix Markman (Episode 109, "Doppelkopfel") | Nominated | |
| 2023 | Writers Guild of Canada (WGC) Screenwriting Awards | Best Writing, Teens & Tweens | Betsy Van Stone & Noelle Stehman (Episode 101, "Tontoom") | Nominated | |
| 2022 | Directors Guild of Canada (DGC) Awards | Best Picture Editing — Comedy or Family Series | Lee Walker (Episode 105, "A-borg") | Won | |
| 2022 | Directors Guild of Canada (DGC) Awards | Outstanding Directorial Achievement in Comedy Series | J Stevens (Episode 104, "One Rib") | Nominated | |
| 2022 | Autostraddle TV Awards | Outstanding Sci-Fi/Fantasy Series | Astrid & Lilly Save the World | Nominated | |
