= Son of a Critch =

Canadian television comedy series

- Genre: Sitcom
- Created by: Mark Critch; Tim McAuliffe
- Based on: Son of a Critch by Mark Critch
- Starring: Benjamin Evan Ainsworth; Mark Critch; Claire Rankin; Colton Gobbo; Sophia Powers; Mark Rivera; Malcolm McDowell
- Narrated by: Mark Critch
- Country of origin: Canada
- No. of seasons: 5
- No. of episodes: 63

Production
- Executive producer: Andrew Barnsley
- Producers: Andrew Barnsley; Perry Chafe; Rob Blackie; John Vatcher; Janine Squires
- Production location: St. John's, Newfoundland and Labrador
- Production companies: Project 10 Productions; Take the Shot Productions; Hawco Productions; The Gary Breakfast Corporation; Lionsgate Television

Original release
- Network: CBC
- Release: January 4, 2022 – present

Son of a Critch is a Canadian sitcom television series, created by Mark Critch and Tim McAuliffe, that premiered on January 4, 2022 on CBC. Based on the memoir of the same name by Critch, the semi-autobiographical series follows an adolescent Mark as he grows up in the 1980s in St. John's, Newfoundland. The series has been renewed for a fifth and final season, which premiered on September 8, 2026.

== Premise ==
The series is a coming of age story based on the childhood and adolescence of Canadian comedian Mark Critch. At the start of the series, 11-year-old Mark is growing up in 1980s Newfoundland, where he navigates starting junior high school (at St. Brigit's), making friends, and connecting with the small group of people in his limited world.

By season four: "From Mark's relentless pursuit of his creative dreams to his burgeoning romance with Fox, we'll watch as he devotedly navigates a quickly growing world. It’s a world filled with new promise, potential and love. And he won't be alone. Every member of his household will also be chasing something greater."

== Cast and characters ==
=== Main ===
- Benjamin Evan Ainsworth as Mark Critch
- Mark Critch as Mike Critch, Mark's father, a news reporter for radio station VOCM
  - Mark Critch narrates the series as his adult self
- Claire Rankin as Mary Critch, Mark's mother
- Malcolm McDowell as Patrick "Pop" Critch, Mark's grandfather
- Colton Gobbo as Mike Critch Jr., Mark's older brother
- Sophia Powers as Jennifer Fox, nicknamed Fox, who is Mark's classmate and girlfriend
- Mark Rivera as Ritchie Perez, Mark's best friend, and a Filipino-Canadian
- Richard Clarkin as Dick Dunphy, Mike's coworker at VOCM

=== Recurring ===
- Lawrence Barry as Mr. Chafe, the Vice-Principal of Mark's school
- Petrina Bromley as Sister Margaret (season 1) and Ms Fowler (season 2), Mark's homeroom teacher
- Pete Soucy as Officer Butt, the local constable
- Stephen Payette as Silver Fox, Jennifer Fox's eldest brother
- Teigan Follett as Middle Fox, Jennifer Fox's older brother
- Nate Penney as the youngest "Baby" Fox sibling
- Nicole Underhay as Suzanne, Fox's mother
- Steve O'Connell as Greg, Fox's absentee father
- Maya McNair as Cara, Mark's school friend
- Daisy Harris as Tina, a student in Mark's class
- Caroline Mangosing as Mrs. Perez, Ritchie's mom
- Eugene Sampang as Mr. Perez, Ritchie's dad
- Rory Lambert as Mr. Byrne, the gym teacher
- Mack Barfoot as Mr. Murphy, owner of VOCM
- Susan Kelsey as Gertie, secretary at VOCM
- Justin Nurse as Paul Royle, Suzanne Fox's new husband and real estate agent
- Ashley Dingwell as Amanda, Dick Dunphy's estranged daughter and Mike Jr.'s girlfriend
- Kate Corbett as Sister Perpetua (season 3), Mark's homeroom teacher
- Nora McLellan as Sister Rose, the principal of Mark's middle school and vice principal of his high school
- Rodrigo Fernandez-Stoll as Father Garcia, one of Mark's teacher who become the principal of his high school
- Shawn Doyle as Mr. Kevin Lewis (season 4), high school acting teacher

=== Guest ===
- Greg Malone as Father Moore
- Richard Waugh as Brendan Critch, Mark's uncle
- Dana Puddicombe as Mary's hospital nurse
- Mark McKinney as The Unfathomable Hudaro
- Alice Krige as Millicent Hearn, an old friend of Pop
- Jay Baruchel as Scott Howell, rival radio station owner (VOAQ)
- Sherry Miller as Johanna Clarke, Mary's mother
- Peter Keleghan as Bill, the Reach for the Top quizmaster
- Robert Joy as Poppy Bell, Mary's father
- Jim Payne as Premier of Newfoundland and Labrador
- Jayne Eastwood as the wife of the Premier of NL
- Dylan Hawco as Brad, high school hockey team star
- Rick Mercer as Bill Bartlet, owner of Bartlet's Bargain Cars and the new owner of VOCM
- Kevin Blackmore as Buddy Wasisname
- Sara Hinding as Kate, Pop's deceased wife
- Susan Kent as Linda Lahey, instructor and CEO of Kareer Kollege
- Geri Hall as Amanda's mother
- Will Coombs as Stephen Rex, Mark's actor friend

== Development ==
=== Conception ===
In 2018, Critch published a memoir about his childhood in Newfoundland. Following its release, McAuliffe suggested developing the book into a television series, which led to him and Critch creating scripts to pitch to various networks. In June 2021, CBC announced they had ordered Son of a Critch to series.

=== Production and distribution ===
The series made its Canadian broadcast premiere on CBC Television on January 4, 2022, as well as CBC's streaming platform, CBC Gem.

Production companies involved with the series include Project 10 Productions, and Take the Shot Productions. Lionsgate distributes the series outside Canada. On February 28, 2022, CBC renewed the series for a second season.

Canadian actor/producer Allan Hawco serves as executive producer for the series through his company Hawco Productions. Hawco and Mark Critch are old friends.

On March 23, 2023, the series was renewed for a third season, with The CW joining CBC and Lionsgate as a distribution company.

On May 23, 2024, the series was renewed for a fourth season that premiered on January 7, 2025.

The series has been renewed for a fifth season. On May 4, 2026, the fifth season was confirmed to be the final season.

== Episodes ==
=== Series overview ===
Season	Episodes	Originally released	
Season	Episodes	First released	Last released
1	13	January 4, 2022	April 12, 2022
2	13	January 3, 2023	March 28, 2023
3	13	January 9, 2024	April 2, 2024
4	13	January 7, 2025	April 8, 2025
5	12	September 8, 2026	TBA

=== Season 1 (2022) ===
No. overall	No. in season	Title	Directed by	Written by	Original release date	Canadian viewers
1	1	"Old Soul, New School"	Renuka Jeyapalan	Mark Critch & Tim McAuliffe	January 4, 2022	941,000
11-year-old Mark goes to junior high in 1986 St. John's, Newfoundland. Mark meets Ritchie, a Filipino Canadian, and the only visible minority student at the school. Mark also meets a female bully named Fox, who comes from a family of bullies that all share the same nickname due to their red hair. Mark eventually defeats his bully with words rather than physical force.
2	2	"Lordy, Lordy, Look Who's Dead"	Renuka Jeyapalan	Mark Critch & Tim McAuliffe	January 11, 2022	836,000
While at a funeral parlour, Mark meets Tina, a classmate. They hit it off and Tina kisses him on the cheek. She later calls him to meet at the park. Mark's friend Ritchie tags along, helping Mark use the bus system. Fox is on the bus and decides to tag along as well. At the park, Mark and Tina hold hands again and Tina again kisses Mark. Later that night, Tina calls Mark to break up with him, at the instigation of Fox, who is standing outside Tina's house, threatening to punch Tina.
3	3	"Cello, I Must Be Going"	Renuka Jeyapalan	Mark Critch & Tim McAuliffe	January 18, 2022	906,000
Mark wants to pursue standup comedy, but Sister Rose won't let him compete in an upcoming contest unless he learns to play the cello. Pop and Sister Rose, who once had romantic encounters in their youths, use Mark as a messenger to pass a series of romantic notes. The cello ends up getting destroyed by the Fox brothers.
4	4	"Cucumber Slumber"	Renuka Jeyapalan	Mark Critch & Tim McAuliffe	January 25, 2022	N/A
The episode is based on the cucumber greenhouse fiasco in Newfoundland. Unfortunately, no one knows what to do with the cucumbers; Newfoundlanders just don't eat them much. Mark and Ritchie have a sleepover at each other's houses and end up becoming best friends.
5	5	"Royal Visit"	Deanne Foley	Mark Critch & Tim McAuliffe	February 1, 2022	710,000
This episode is based on the visit of Princess Diana and Prince Charles to Newfoundland in 1983. Mark is chosen by his Monarchist society to present a bouquet to Diana and Dick Dunphy flirts with Mary (raising Mike Sr.'s ire.)
6	6	"Candyland"	Deanne Foley	Anita Kapila	February 22, 2022	N/A
Mark and Ritchie have an unusually eventful night of Halloween trick-or-treating.
7	7	"Father Critch"	Deanne Foley	Mark Critch & Tim McAuliffe	March 1, 2022	N/A
This episode's theme is about protecting Mark, whom is preparing for his confirmation, from learning about the Mount Cashel Orphanage abuse scandal and the Catholic Church's role in it.
8	8	"Merry Critch-mas"	Deanne Foley	Heidi Brander	March 8, 2022	N/A
Mark's estranged uncle Brendan makes an unexpected Christmas visit.
9	9	"Acting Normal"	Jay Baruchel	Anita Kapila	March 15, 2022	N/A
Mark and Mike Sr bond over the school's upcoming Easter play and Pop has trouble with the CRA because has been collecting his dead wife's pension.
10	10	"Misty"	Jay Baruchel	Nadiya Chettiar	March 22, 2022	N/A
Mary goes into the hospital for minor surgery and the Critch men promptly fall apart.
11	11	"Particip-action"	Anthony Farrell	Cathryn Naiker	March 29, 2022	N/A
Fox sets her sights on the gym teacher's long standing St.Brigit's Sports Day record for first place ribbons.
12	12	"Circus"	Anthony Farrell	Romeo Candido	April 5, 2022	N/A
Ritchie is conflicted by his heritage (Filipino-Canadian or Newfoundlander?), and Mark and Fox go on a "non-date" at a traveling carnival.
13	13	"Save the Last Dance for Me"	John Vatcher	Anita Kapila	April 12, 2022	N/A
As the school year ends, Mark plans to ask Fox to the school dance, but is confused when he sees Ritchie spending time with her; he only later finds out that Ritchie was helping Fox study math so she can pass the grade. Mary is upset when she discovers Mike Jr. wants to move away to attend the University of New Brunswick, but eventually supports his plan. Mike Sr. worries for his job after Dick tells him that the station would be introducing an all-music format, but it turns out the format is for VOCM's new FM station.

=== Season 2 (2023) ===
No. overall	No. in season	Title	Directed by	Written by	Original release date
14	1	"Growing Apart"	Renuka Jeyapalan	Mark Critch & Tim McAuliffe	January 3, 2023
Mark is shocked when Fox returns to school with an older boyfriend who can drive.
15	2	"You're Dead After School"	Renuka Jeyapalan	Mark Critch & Tim McAuliffe	January 10, 2023
Mark is fated to fight Fox's boyfriend, but gets some unexpected reinforcements, and Fox saves the day.
16	3	"Feast or Famine"	Renuka Jeyapalan	Perry Chafe	January 17, 2023
St. Bridget's school holds a fast and sleep over for Lent, in part due to the famine in Ethiopia, and in an effort to win a bike (for selling the most boxes of chocolate covered almonds) Mark fashions himself as Live Aid organizer Bob Geldof.
17	4	"Beer Necessities"	Renuka Jeyapalan	Mark Critch & Tim McAuliffe	January 24, 2023
Mark faces peer pressure to try his first beer during the great Newfoundland Beer Strike.
18	5	"Family Tree"	Deanne Foley	Mark Critch & Tim McAuliffe	January 31, 2023
Mark, with the help of Fox and Ritchie, discovers a dark secret of his family tree.
19	6	"Who Dares Dare Hudaro?"	Deanne Foley	Nadiya Chettiar	February 7, 2023
Mark falls under the spell of a Vegas hypnotist.
20	7	"The Perfect Storm"	Deanne Foley	Heidi Brander	February 14, 2023
This episode is based on the historic ice storm of 1984. Mike and Mary miss their 20th wedding anniversary dinner, and Mike Jr mans the phone lines, on air, alone at VOCM.
21	8	"Spirit Week"	Deanne Foley	Amanda Joy	February 21, 2023
The kids are allowed to wear jeans at school for Spirit week, but Mark does not own a pair.
22	9	"European Vacation"	John Vatcher	Mark Critch & Tim McAuliffe	February 28, 2023
Mark's class goes on a field trip to Saint Pierre and Miquelon, with Pop Critch as a chaperone.
23	10	"Old Friends, New Friends"	John Vatcher	Heidi Brander & Justin Rawana	March 7, 2023
Mark and Ritchie make new friends, girls who are Protestant.
24	11	"Pope Visit"	John Vatcher	Amanda Joy	March 14, 2023
This episode revolves around Pope John Paul II's visit to Newfoundland in September 1984. Fox has to do a reading from the Bible for the Pope and is worried she will mess it up, and a rival radio station tries to lure both Mike and Mike Jr. from VOCM.
25	12	"Details are Scanty"	Vanessa Matsui	Anita Kapila	March 21, 2023
Mike Critch Sr. gets an Edward R. Murrow Award for ethics in journalism, but also faces an ethical dilemma, and the Royal Newfoundland Constabulary gets (and loses) guns for the first time.
26	13	"Halley's Comet"	Renuka Jeyapalan	Mark Critch & Tim McAuliffe	March 28, 2023
Mark is fascinated by Halley's Comet but frightened by Ronald Reagan and nuclear war, Fox may move away, and a drive-thru Ches's Fish and Chips is being built next door to the Critch home.

=== Season 3 (2024) ===
No. overall	No. in season	Title	Directed by	Written by	Original release date
27	1	"That Was Me In Grade Nine"	Renuka Jeyapalan	Mark Critch & Tim McAuliffe	January 9, 2024
Mark begins his last year of middle school only to discover he needs glasses, and Mike Jr works full-time at VOCM.
28	2	"Reach For The Top"	Renuka Jeyapalan	Mark Critch & Tim McAuliffe	January 16, 2024
Mark competes on the iconic Canadian academic high school quiz show: Reach for the Top. Mike Jr is out late, broadcasting from a bar.
29	3	"You're Full Of It"	Deanne Foley	Mark Critch & Tim McAuliffe	January 23, 2024
Mark needs to pee desperately, but every toilet is broken or unavailable. Mary calls her father, a plumber, to fix their toilet despite the fact that he and Mike Sr have never gotten along. Fox finds herself parenting her two brothers.
30	4	"Growing Pains"	Renuka Jeyapalan	Story by : Tim McAuliffe; Teleplay by : Mark Critch	January 30, 2024
With all his friends playing arcade video games, Mark sells his comic book collection. Pop needs a hearing aide, and the Critch household gets a new, modern telephone.
31	5	"Bonfire Night"	Renuka Jeyapalan	Mark Critch	February 6, 2024
It's bonfire night. Mark and Ritchie's plans to spend it with Fox get derailed when her brother involves her in his illegal activities. Meanwhile, Pop and Mary races to save Pop's priceless chair.
32	6	"My Funny Valentine"	Deanne Foley	Perry Chafe	February 13, 2024
Mark struggles with having two valentines. Mary struggles with feeling unneeded in the house. Dick struggles with a shocking reveal.
33	7	"Go Into The Light"	Deanne Foley	Amanda Joy	February 20, 2024
After almost drowning, Mark struggles with his faith. Dick moves in with The Critches to avoid getting fired. Fox bonds with Tina.
34	8	"Thanksgiving"	Deanne Foley	Mark Critch	February 27, 2024
Mark is set to direct the school drama but, unsatisfied with his friends' performances, he fires them. Pop's brother Leo comes to visit.
35	9	"The Ghost Of Christmas Presents"	Vanessa Matsui	Kerri MacDonald	March 5, 2024
Pop insists that he can kill the turkey he won by himself, but instead bonds with it. Mike Sr and Mary bought Mark a video game console for Mark's Christmas present but Mark finds it a couple days before and secretly plays with it during the night. Mike Jr wants to introduce his girlfriend Linda to the family, but Linda's condition surprises Mary.
36	10	"How To Succeed In Business"	Vanessa Matsui	Justin Rawana	March 12, 2024
In the days after Newfoundland's attempt at double daylight saving time, Mark and Ritchie starts selling coffee to teachers. Meanwhile, Mike Sr becomes a spokesman at a new company.
37	11	"Airing Out"	John Vatcher	Anita Kapila	March 19, 2024
On Mark's 14th birthday, after geting caught with a porn magazine, Mark receives several talks. Mike Jr invites Linda to Mark's birthday party against his parents' wishes, but after a discussion with Mike Sr, Mary starts to approve their relationship.
38	12	"Cabaret"	John Vatcher	Heidi Brander	March 26, 2024
Linda is spending a lot of times in the Critch's house, which initially angers Mary and Pop due to how inconsiderate she is. However Linda opens up to Mary and praises Mike Jr which lowers the tension. Mark has his first public stage comedy show.
39	13	"Forever Young"	John Vatcher	Mark Critch	April 2, 2024
The kids are almost graduating. Mark is valedictorian and has to prepare a speech. Linda delivers her baby but chooses the baby's father over Mike Jr. Fox and Mark has their first kiss.

=== Season 4 (2025) ===
No. overall	No. in season	Title	Directed by	Written by	Original release date
40	1	"Groove Is in the Heart"	John Vatcher	Mark Critch & Tim McAuliffe	January 7, 2025
Mark and gang starts high school, encountering a few familiar faces. Pop, having moved out of the bedroom he shared with Mark, passes his free time tinkering with a long-range radio.
41	2	"Field Party"	John Vatcher	Mark Critch & Tim McAuliffe	January 14, 2025
Fox gets invited to a field party. Despite Mark's initial reluctance, he, Ritche, and Fox's brothers ends up going. Unfortunately the invite turns out to be a trick by bullies targeting Fox's brothers. VOCM's owner plans to sell the station and asks Mike, Dick, and Mike Jr to drive up the ratings so that he can sell the station at a more favorable price. Mike hires a girl to act as the station's mascot, who turns out to be Dick's daughter.
42	3	"Front Page Challenge"	John Vatcher	Perry Chafe	January 21, 2025
Mark and his friends run the school paper. Mark gets to write the front page article, covering Sister Rose who passed the hockey captain's failed math test so that the school can win a game. Mike Jr and Dick's daughter, Amanda, spend some time together while helping Pop who tries to install a waterbed. Mike and Mary goes on a trip, with Mike being tasked by VOCM to cover the Meech Lake Accord.
43	4	"Got to Get Me Moose B'y"	John Vatcher	Mark Critch & Tim McAuliffe	January 28, 2025
After Pop's Moose license came in the mail, Mark, Pop, and Mary's father Poppy Bell go on a hunting trip. Fox's mother introduces her kid to her new boyfriend Paul, a soon-to-be divorced real estate agent. Mike Jr's casual way of delivering the news brings a complaint to the station.
44	5	"Child Star"	Deanne Foley	Mark Critch & Tim McAuliffe	February 4, 2025
Mark gets cast in a short advertisement. He meets experienced child actor Steve during the shoot and makes friend with him. After being pressured to drink by VOCM's new owner at a work party, Mike relapses and spends the next day drinking.
45	6	"Happy 1990"	Deanne Foley	Amanda Joy	February 11, 2025
It's New Year's Eve. Fox's mom and her boyfriend Paul goes on a double date with Mike and Mary. Fox has to babysit her brother, and invites Mark along. Ritchie assumes that Fox means to ask Mark to have sex, and pressures Mark to buy a box of condom. That night, Mark and Fox clears up the misunderstanding but ends up getting caught kissing by both sets of parents anyway. Pop spent the whole night alone, reminiscing his deceased wife.
46	7	"Getting Doubles"	Deanne Foley	Heidi Brander	February 18, 2025
On a drama club trip out of town, Mark and Cara, a girl from the drama club, falls asleep in the same bed. Ritchie takes a picture of the moment, leading Mark to try to hide it from Fox once they are back in school. Mary struggles with getting older, while Mike struggles with feeling like he has done nothing with his life. Both gets advice from Pop.
47	8	"The Stage"	Deanne Foley	Kerri MacDonald	February 25, 2025
Mark goes to a house party hosted by Mr Lewis, his drama teacher. He invites Fox along. With the other party goers being Lewis's friends, all adults, Fox is unable to enjoy the night and leaves in anger. Meanwhile Mary gets uncomfortable that Mark is spending so much time with Mr Lewis, but after talking it out Mary approves of Lewis mentoring Mark. Dick discovers that Amanda has been seeing Mike Jr.
48	9	"The Last Stop"	Joyce Wong	Mark Critch & Tim McAuliffe	March 4, 2025
Mark confronts a tragedy, Mary goes to career college, and Mike and Pop take the last run on the Newfie Bullet.
49	10	"Peace A Chord"	Joyce Wong	Amanda Joy	March 18, 2025
Mark becomes an emcee for a Peace-A-Chord festival. Ritchie and his band performs, despite his dad initially being against it. Fox's dad finally signs the divorce papers, making the separation between Fox's parents official. Mary experiences menopause.
50	11	"Lest We Forget"	Vanessa Matsui	Mark Critch & Tim McAuliffe	March 25, 2025
Mark and Pop spends the day together. With the inadvertent help of Sister Rose, Pop showed the view from the top of the Basilica of St. John the Baptist tower to Mark. Mary and Fox spends the day together as mall pageant models. Mike Jr hosts a get-together with Amanda's mom, only for Dick to crash in.
51	12	"Party on Wheels"	Vanessa Matsui	Perry Chafe	April 1, 2025
In order to graduate her Career College course, Mary has to conduct a historical tour. Mike and Pop comes by to support her. Asked to look after Paul's house while he and Fox's mom go on vacation, Fox hosts a party instead. Mark helps with the party preparation and the cleanup. Amanda reveals to Dick that she wants to study on the mainland. Mike Jr. overhears, but is supportive.
52	13	"For the Rest of Your Life"	John Vatcher	Mark Critch & Tim McAuliffe	April 8, 2025
Fox's mom gets married in a wedding organized by Mary. After initially struggling, Fox gives a speech at the wedding. Mark gets the opportunity to showcase his sketches to a national audience, since the show takes place at the same time as the wedding, he has to split his time between the two events. Pop gets diagnosed with dementia.

=== Season 5 (2026) ===
No. overall	No. in season	Title	Directed by	Written by	Original release date
53	1	"The Regretta"	John Vatcher	Mark Critch	September 8, 2026
Set during the Regatta day, Mike is roped in to act as the mascot for VOCM's sponsor. Mary was asked by the Tourism Department to man a cod-kissing booth while Pop mans a rigged game booth nearby.
54	2	"Teach a Man to Fish"	John Vatcher	Perry Chafe	September 15, 2026
The government is shutting down the cod fishery, causing over 30.000 workers to lose their jobs overnight. Anxious about the news, and thinking about his future, Mark chooses his elective and receives advice from multiple adults in his life.
55	3	"The Great Debate"	John Vatcher	Mark Critch	September 22, 2026
Still reeling from the cod moratorium, Mike worries about being kicked out of the company house. Meanwhile, Mark gets the chance to partake in a debate on TV, but has to decide whether to follow what he's been told to say or to think for himself.
56	4	"Masquerade"	John Vatcher	Ashley Lannigan & Amanda Joy	September 29, 2026
Mark sneaks into a Halloween party taking place in a bar using Mike Jr's ID. Mary and Pop spent some time together. Mike goes with VOCM owner Mr Bartlet to survey a much smaller station that Bartlet also owns, with Bartlet implying that he wants the Critch family to move out of the VOCM company house.
57	5	"Empty Nets"	Deanne Foley	Perry Chafe	October 6, 2026
Mark accompanies Pop for a sit-in at the Premier's office. Tension escalates between the protesters and security officers, but Mark diffuses it by taking the stage and using impersonation to mock the Premier. Meanwhile, thanks to an earlier chance encounter, Mary and Mike are invited to tea with the Premier and his wife where they are offered jobs in the Premier's office to help with the Premier's falling approval ratings. Amanda gets a job offer at VOCM, but she reveals to Mike Jr. that it is the same position as Mike Sr.
58	6	"Musical Chairs"	Deanne Foley	Amanda Joy	October 13, 2026
Mark struggles with being cast in a minor role on the senior school play. Mary's father had a medical scare and has to stay with the Critch's, but Mike and Pop struggles with adjusting to having him there. Fox's mom moves to Alberta chasing the real estate market, while Fox chooses to stay in Newfoundland with her eldest brother.
59	7	"Green Christmas"	Deanne Foley	Mark Critch	October 20, 2026
Mark and Pop go into the woods to find a real Christmas tree, but things take a serious turn when Pop becomes confused, mistakes Mark for his son, and they get lost. Meanwhile, Mary discovers that the family could lose their home because Mike's boss plans to tear it down. Mark also tries to make Christmas special for Fox, who is missing her family.
60	8	"Ditch Day"	Deanne Foley	Perry Chafe	October 27, 2026
Mark and his classmates skip school to celebrate their final year. As they think about life after graduation, Mark's plans for the future cause problems in his relationship with Fox. Meanwhile, Mike struggles with changes at work.
61	9	"Live in to Win"	Renuka Jeyapalan	Mark Critch	November 3, 2026
After his break up with Fox, Mark throws himself into acting. He spends too much time in it however, and fails a math test. Mike gets an opportunity to clandestinely rate his own radio show, but decides not to. Pop enters a competition for a new car hosted by Mike Jr and Magic 97 and is outplayed by another competitor.
62	10	"Graduation Day"	Renuka Jeyapalan	Amanda Joy	November 10, 2026
Mike has his retirement party and last broadcast. Pop's dementia worsen even further and has him wandering the town all alone at night, making the family search for him. Mark ditches prom half way, and properly says goodbye to Fox who is moving to Alberta.
63	11	"Adult Themes"	Renuka Jeyapalan	Mark Critch	November 17, 2026
The Critch's look for a new place to move into. Mark has his first professional audition, and after a lot of notes from the director, goes home discouraged. Later that night, Mark receives a call telling him that he gets the part.

== Reception ==
On the review aggregator website Rotten Tomatoes, the first season has an approval rating of 100% based on six critic reviews.

Son of a Critch was watched by an average of 941,000 viewers on its January 4, 2022 Canadian debut; it was the 28th most-watched program in Canada that week.

At the 11th Canadian Screen Awards (held in 2023), Son of a Critch was nominated for four awards and one audience award. The show was nominated for seven awards at the 12th Canadian Screen Awards in 2024 and won the Cogeco Fund Audience Choice.

=== Accolades ===
Award	Category	Recipient(s)	Result	Ref.
11th Canadian Screen Awards	Best Supporting Performance in a Comedy Series	Malcolm McDowell	Nominated	
11th Canadian Screen Awards	Performance in a guest role in a comedy series	Rodrigo Fernandez-Stoll	Nominated	
11th Canadian Screen Awards	Hair	Norma Richard, "Save the Last Dance for Me"	Nominated	
11th Canadian Screen Awards	Best Original Music, Comedy	Alan Doyle and Keith Power	Nominated	
11th Canadian Screen Awards	Audience Choice		Nominated	
12th Canadian Screen Awards	Canadian Screen Award for Best Comedy Series	Mark Critch, Tim McAuliffe, Andrew Barnsley, Allan Hawco, Ben Murray, Perry Chafe, John Vatcher, Amanda Joy, Rob Blackie	Nominated	
12th Canadian Screen Awards	Lead performance, comedy	Benjamin Evan Ainsworth	Nominated	
12th Canadian Screen Awards	Lead performance, comedy	Mark Critch	Nominated	
12th Canadian Screen Awards	Performance in a guest role in a comedy series	Jay Baruchel	Nominated	
12th Canadian Screen Awards	Best Original Music, Comedy	Alan Doyle and Keith Power, "Halley's Comet"	Nominated	
12th Canadian Screen Awards	Hair	Norma Richard, "Who Dares Dare Hudaro?"	Nominated	
12th Canadian Screen Awards	Casting, Fiction	Jenny Lewis (casting director) and Sara Kay	Nominated	
12th Canadian Screen Awards	Cogeco Fund Audience Choice		Won	
13th Canadian Screen Awards	Performance in a guest role in a comedy series	Rodrigo Fernandez-Stoll	Nominated	
13th Canadian Screen Awards	Best Photography, Comedy	Jason Tan	Nominated	
13th Canadian Screen Awards	Best Picture Editing, Comedy	Pauline DeCriox	Nominated	

== International broadcast ==
Paramount+ acquired streaming rights to the series in the UK in 2022.

In Ireland, the show broadcasts on RTÉ One and RTÉ Player .

In the United States, the series premiered on July 24, 2023, on The CW (although some US markets near the Canadian border who receive CBC Television are ahead in episodes). Season two premiered on October 26, 2023. Season three premiered on January 25, 2024. After the third season, The CW opted not to renew distribution for further seasons, focusing on other shows like Wild Cards.

Starting in 2025, the series became available on Netflix in Canada and the United States. International distribution is currently handled by Lionsgate Television.
