= Zorras =

Zorras were a multimedia performance troupe based in Edinburgh, Scotland from 2007 to 2013. They emerged from the city's alternative poetry and music scenes in 2008, and performed at some of the most renowned international counterculture locations and events. Zorras were part of growing queer, LGBT, feminist and disabled/crip cultural movements in Scotland, and instrumental in raising awareness of disabled and D/deaf access in LGBTQ+ and arts communities. They created artworks that explored issues of language, sexuality, gender, race, class, mental health and disability.

Zorras' founding members were Sandra Alland and Y Josephine. Other collaborators included Ariadna Battich, Nathan Gale and Gord Disley. Alland wrote and performed the text, Josephine wrote and performed the music, and Alland and Battich created films. Gale and Disley performed as guest musicians on various occasions.

Zorras were most known for their live performances, where they often added video to their fusion of music and poetry. Some of Zorras' most distinguishing elements were the use of sound poetry, cajón and megaphones; they also implemented guitar, props and bilingual (English-Spanish) storytelling.

Zorras produced one CD ("We Apologise For Any Inconvenience", 2009) and one EP ("Doctor Says", 2012), both with the indie label Minor Assault Records. Zorras co-founded Cachín Cachán Cachunga! in 2009, a queer and trans performance and visual art event curated by Alland. Alland's commitment to disabled and D/deaf access led to Zorras captioning their videos and hiring British Sign Language interpreters and wheelchair-accessible spaces for events they produced.

In autumn of 2009, ultimatemetal.com said of Zorras: "A very unique [sic] mix of poetry, music, stories and just plain weird. The poetry was sharp and funny, the placement effective, the visuals fitting; a rather unforgettable experience."

== Background ==
Sandra Alland and Yudnara Josephine met in November 2007 at Who's Your Dandy?, a queer and trans literary event founded by Alland in Edinburgh and given a 4-star review by The Skinny in December 2007. Alland was reading her poetry at the event, and Josephine was singing and playing cajón with the (now-defunct) Contrabajo. According to Diva and The F Word interviews in 2009, the two artists were taken with each other immediately.

The duo's debut performance as Zorras was in January 2008 at The Golden Hour at Edinburgh's Forest Cafe. Following this event, they began to perform widely throughout the city, including at Itsy's Kabarett (Voodoo Rooms), Cocoon Counter Culture Festival, Bongo Club, Roxy Arthouse, Noisy Nights (Traverse Theatre) and Edinburgh Queer Mutiny. They often gave artist talks and performances at various Scottish LGBT events.

Zorras produced a CD in July 2009 (We Apologise For Any Inconvenience), which was highlighted in San Francisco's Curve in their January/February 2010 issue: "…a more experimental take on spoken word performance than your average word-spitter. Zorras deliver their musical stories bilingually, mixing text, sound poetry, percussion, guitar, megaphones, singing and projected visual images. They are still interesting on CD, mixing it up between more musical numbers like the guitar-folk 'Nest' and more radio-dramatized pieces like 'Here's To Wang.' I personally love the 'In the Details' spoken interludes, humorous musings on the idiosyncrasies of the Bulgarian language."

Another US magazine, the on-line AfterEllen.com, said of them in March 2011: "(Zorras) do a great job of injecting humor into their poetry and are the first spoken-word group to have actually captured my interest."

In 2009 Zorras also began to collaborate with other artists, including Ariadna Battich, Nathan Gale and Gord Disley. Working with other artists helped to elevate their work to a new level of integrated performance. Battich's videos featured in many of Zorras' performances.

Between 2009 and 2012, Zorras's reputation grew throughout the UK, Europe and Canada. Soho Theatre presented their work as part of a co-production with Oxford Playhouse and Chroma Journal in 2009. Zorras featured at countless events in London, including Jawdance (Apples and Snakes), Ladyfest, GFest – gayWise LGBT Arts Festival and Write Queer London (Museum of London). They made their debut in Manchester in 2010–11 at Pussy Whipped and Debt Records Presents. In September 2010, Ste McCabe from Dandelion Radio said of them: "My favourite Edinburgh music duo, full-stop". In Glasgow Zorras presented work at The Arches, Initial Itch, Words Per Minute and Aye Write!. They also performed at Liverpool's Homotopia, Birmingham's Shout, Amsterdam's Queeristan, Berlin's Entzaubert Film Festival and Café D'Espacio in Las Palmas de Gran Canaria. In 2011, they featured at Edinburgh International Book Festival, as well as touring six Canadian cities. Zorras returned to Canada for six months in 2012, performing widely in Toronto including at the closing party for Toronto Women's Bookstore.

Alland and Josephine's work with Zorras has been published in several literary anthologies in Scotland and Canada, notably with Montreal's Matrix Magazine, Toronto's press press press in 2010 and London's Poems for Pussy Riot (English PEN, 2012).

== Works ==
Performance Works

- "Found in Translation" (2009) (Soho Theatre, produced by Oxford Playhouse and Chroma Journal)

Albums

- "We Apologise For Any Inconvenience" (2009) (Minor Assault Records)
- "Doctor Says" (2012) (Minor Assault Records)

Videos

- "Paper Cut" (2012) (Sandra Alland)
- "Weapons of Minor Destruction" (2012) (Sandra Alland)

Anthologies and Magazines

- "Crisis Book: An Anthology Thing" (2010) (press press press, Toronto)
- "Matrix Magazine: New Feminisms" (2010) (Matrix Magazine online) featuring songs "After Going Out" and "After the Phone Call"
- "Poems For Pussy Riot" (2012) (English PEN) featuring Alland's "Weapons of Minor Destruction" and Zorras' video of the same name
- "Maricón 1" (2009)
- "Maricón 2" (2009)
- "Maricón 3" (2011)
