= Lorne Elliott =

Canadian comedian, musician, author, and playwright

Christopher Lorne Elliott, known by his stage name Lorne Elliott is a Canadian comedian, musician, author, and playwright. He is best known for his 11 years as host of the CBC Radio program Madly Off in All Directions.

== Career ==
Elliott first began performing in 1974, as a folk musician, under his full name of Chris Lorne Elliott; he later truncated his name so as to avoid being confused with Chris Elliott. He soon teamed up with Kevin Blackmore (a.k.a. "Buddy Wasisname") to establish the comedic musical duo Free Beer (1979–1982), before joining the CBC.

The Montreal Mirror has described him as a "national treasure".

== Discography ==
- The Collected Mistakes
- The Collected Mistakes II
- More Lorne Elliott
- Selections in All Directions
- Selections in All Directions, Volume 2
