= Tim McAuliffe =

Canadian television writer and producer

- Born: September 18 Montreal, Quebec
- Occupation: Comedy writer, television producer, actor

Tim McAuliffe (born September 18) is a Canadian comedy writer, television producer and occasional actor from Montreal, Quebec, Canada, known for his work on The Last Man on Earth, The Office, Late Night with Jimmy Fallon, Up All Night, Corner Gas, This Hour Has 22 Minutes, and creating the TV series Son of a Critch and Happy Together (CBS).

== Career ==
McAuliffe is a writer/producer who is currently the co-creator and executive producer of CBC's Son of a Critch. He has also serves as showrunner on the upcoming Paramount Plus show, Players. He is also a writer and producer on Peacock's MacGruber (starring Will Forte, Kriten Wiig, and Ryan Phillippe). His past credits include, writer and producer for NBC's The Office, writer and executive producer for FOX's Last Man on Earth, writer for Late Night with Jimmy Fallon, writer and producer of NBC's Up All Night, and executive producer and creator of CBS's Happy Together.

In Canada, McAuliffe was showrunner, executive producer and writer on CBC TV's This Hour Has 22 Minutes, a writer for CTV's Corner Gas, and the creator, executive producer and showrunner of CTV's Satisfaction. He has also written a series of live gala performances at the Just for Laughs Comedy Festival. McAuliffe has won two Writers Guild of Canada Awards.

=== Filmography ===
As writer

- '88 Dodge Aries (2002) (also as producer, director)
- Mistress Shopping (2004)
- Branding Mupatu (2004) as Steve Sandusky
- 2005 MuchMusic Video Awards (2005) (TV)
- Brain Fart (2005)
- Stars on Trial (2005)
- Battle of the Exes (2006)
- 2006 MuchMusic Video Awards (2006)
- Much Music Hot/Not 2006 (2006)
- 100 Best Videos Ever (2007)
- Video on Trial (52 episodes, 2005–2007)
- The Hour (5 episodes, 2006–2007)
- The Ha!ifax Comedy Fest (6 episodes, 2010)
- Late Night with Jimmy Fallon (134 episodes, 2009–2010)
- Moderation Town (2010)
- Dan for Mayor (1 episode, 2011)
- Decline of the American Empire (2012)
- This Hour Has 22 Minutes (81 episodes, 2006–2012)
- Just for Laughs (1 episode, 2012)
- Dr. Bob's House (2012)
- Up All Night (5 episodes, 2011–2012)
- The Muppets All-Star Comedy Gala (2012)
- The Office (1 episode, 2013)
- Satisfaction (5 episodes, 2013)
- The Last Man on Earth (9 episodes, 2015-2017)
- Happy Together (2018-2019)
- Bless the Harts (2021) Episode #21: "Big Pimpin"
- Son of a Critch (2022- ) 16 episodes with Mark Critch

As actor

- Mistress Shopping (2004) as Steve Sandusky
- Branding Mupatu (2004) as Steve Sandusky
- Stars on Trial (2005) as Rusty Waters
- Famous Fallouts (2005) as Dan Snyder
- 2006 MuchMusic Video Awards (2006) as Mark 'The PA'
- Overrated in '06 (2006) as Lord Balthazar Sandusky

== Awards and nominations ==
McAuliffe has received peer and industry recognition for his work on This Hour Has 22 Minutes.

- 2008, won Writers Guild of Canada WGC Award Variety award for This Hour Has 22 Minutes
- 2008, nominated for Writers Guild of Canada WGC Award Variety award for This Hour Has 22 Minutes
- 2008, nominated for Gemini Award "Best Writing in a Comedy or Variety Program or Series" for This Hour Has 22 Minutes
- 2011, nominated for Gemini Award for "Best Comedy Program or Series" for This Hour Has 22 Minutes
