= Caught (2018 TV series) =

- Genre: Crime drama
- Starring: Allan Hawco; Paul Gross; Eric Johnson; Tori Anderson; Enuka Okuma; Greg Bryk
- Country of origin: Canada
- Original language: English
- No. of seasons: 1
- No. of episodes: 5

Production
- Executive producers: Allan Hawco; Alex Patrick; Peter Blackie; Rob Blackie; Perry Chafe
- Producer: John Vatcher
- Editors: James Patrick; Derm Carberry; Lyly Fortin; Adam Rafuse
- Production companies: Take the Shot Productions; CBC Television

Original release
- Network: CBC Television
- Release: February 26, 2018

Caught is a Canadian crime drama television series written and produced by Allan Hawco that debuted on CBC Television on February 26, 2018. Based on the 2014 novel by Lisa Moore, Caught is about a drug dealer who, with the help of a corrupt cop, makes a daring jailbreak from a New Brunswick prison in 1978, and travels across the globe to hunt down his drug king-pin ex-partner.

Allan Hawco (Republic of Doyle) was presented with the story by eOne's Tecca Crosby (SVP, Scripted Development) and was eager to take on the project due to its rich story and characters. The series was produced by Take The Shot with CBC in Canada, with distribution handled by eOne.

== Cast ==
- Allan Hawco as David Slaney: a drug dealer who escapes from prison in 1978 to undertake another heist
- Paul Gross as Roy Patterson: an alcoholic renegade detective
- Eric Johnson as Brian Hearn: Slaney's former partner in crime
- Tori Anderson as Ada
- Enuka Okuma as KC Williams
- Greg Bryk as Cyril Carter

== Episodes ==
No.	Title	Directed by	Written by	Original release date
1	"The Break"	T. J. Scott	Perry Chafe, Allan Hawco and John Krizanc	February 26, 2018
David Slaney agrees to go undercover and breaks out of prison with the help of rogue detective Roy Patterson in an effort to apprehend Slaney's old partner in crime Brian Hearn.
2	"Old Wounds"	T. J. Scott	Perry Chafe, Allan Hawco and John Krizanc	March 5, 2018
Slaney heads to Montreal to pick up money for a drug deal and meets up with an old business acquaintance.
3	"Just Trust Me"	T. J. Scott	Perry Chafe, Allan Hawco and John Krizanc	March 12, 2018
Slaney meets up with Hearn in Cancun with Patterson and KC in close pursuit.
4	"Like Old Times"	John Vatcher	Julia Cohen, Allan Hawco and John Krizanc	March 19, 2018
Slaney and Hearn get ready to meet a new drug supplier. Hearn asks Ada to spy on Slaney.
5	"Bone Dog"	John Vatcher	Adriana Maggs, Allan Hawco and John Krizanc	March 26, 2018
Slaney heads to Colombia with Ada to pick up the money for the drug deal. The DEA and RCMP are closing in.
