= Blue Ice Pictures =

Canadian production company

Blue Ice Pictures is a Canadian production company. It acquired South African production company Out of Africa in 2012, and Canadian production company Foundry Films from Daniel Iron in 2013.

== Productions ==
Recent productions include:

- Astrid and Lilly Save the World
- Ginny & Georgia
- SurrealEstate
- Spinning Out
- Vagrant Queen
- Goalie
- In Contempt
- The Indian Detective
- Madiba
- Revival
- The Z-Suite
- Hive
