= Colton Gobbo =

Canadian actor

- Born: September 20, 2000 (age 26); Greater Sudbury, Ontario, Canada
- Occupation: Actor
- Years active: 2009–present

Colton Gobbo is a Canadian actor, best known for his regular roles as Jordan in the television series Ginny & Georgia and Mike in Son of a Critch.

== Early life and education ==
A native of Sudbury, Ontario, where he attended St. Charles College, he had his first acting role in a production of Hair for the city's YES Theatre in 2009. He studied in the theatre program at George Brown College.

== Career ==
Gobbo began appearing in television with supporting roles in Fear Thy Neighbor, Orphan Black, What Would Sal Do?, Taken and Titans.

In 2016, Gobbo played Jared in the television film For Love & Honor starring James Denton and Natalie Brown, directed by Laurie Lynd, which was released on August 29, 2017. In the same year, Gobbo starred as Barney in the comedy drama film Operation Christmas List alongside Kyle Peacock, Jacob Soley and Julia Pulo, which was released on December 10, 2016.

In 2019, Gobbo appeared as Lettermen in the horror film Scary Stories to Tell in the Dark directed by André Øvredal, based on the children's book series of the same name by Alvin Schwartz, which was released on August 9, 2019.

In 2021, Gobbo was cast in his first major role as Noah, the son of Naomi Watts's character in the thriller film The Desperate Hour.

In 2022, Gobbo was cast to play the main role of Mike Critch Jr. in the comedy series Son of a Critch.

In 2023, Gobbo appeared in a regional production of The Curious Incident of the Dog in the Night-Time. Gobbo played the lead role of Christopher Boone in the show, which played at the Sudbury Theatre Centre between October 20 and November 5, 2023.

== Filmography ==
Year	Title	Role	Notes
2015	Fear Thy Neighbor	David Kersey	Episode: "Kill-De-Sac"
2016	Orphan Black	Teenager	Episode: "Transgressive Border Crossing"
2016	For Love & Honor	Jared	Television film
2016	Operation Christmas List	Barney	Lead role / Film
2017	What Would Sal Do?	Harry	Episode: "Fruit of the Womb"
2018	Taken	Bret	Episode: "Charm School"
2018	Titans	Kyle	Episode: "Titans"
2019	Scary Stories to Tell in the Dark	Letterman #1	
2021	The Desperate Hour	Noah	
2021–present	Ginny & Georgia	Jordan	Recurring role
2022–present	Son of a Critch	Mike Critch Jr.	Main role
2025	Everything's Going To Be Great	Metalhead	
2026	Surfacing	Tyler	
