= Ryan Paevey =

American actor and model (born 1984)

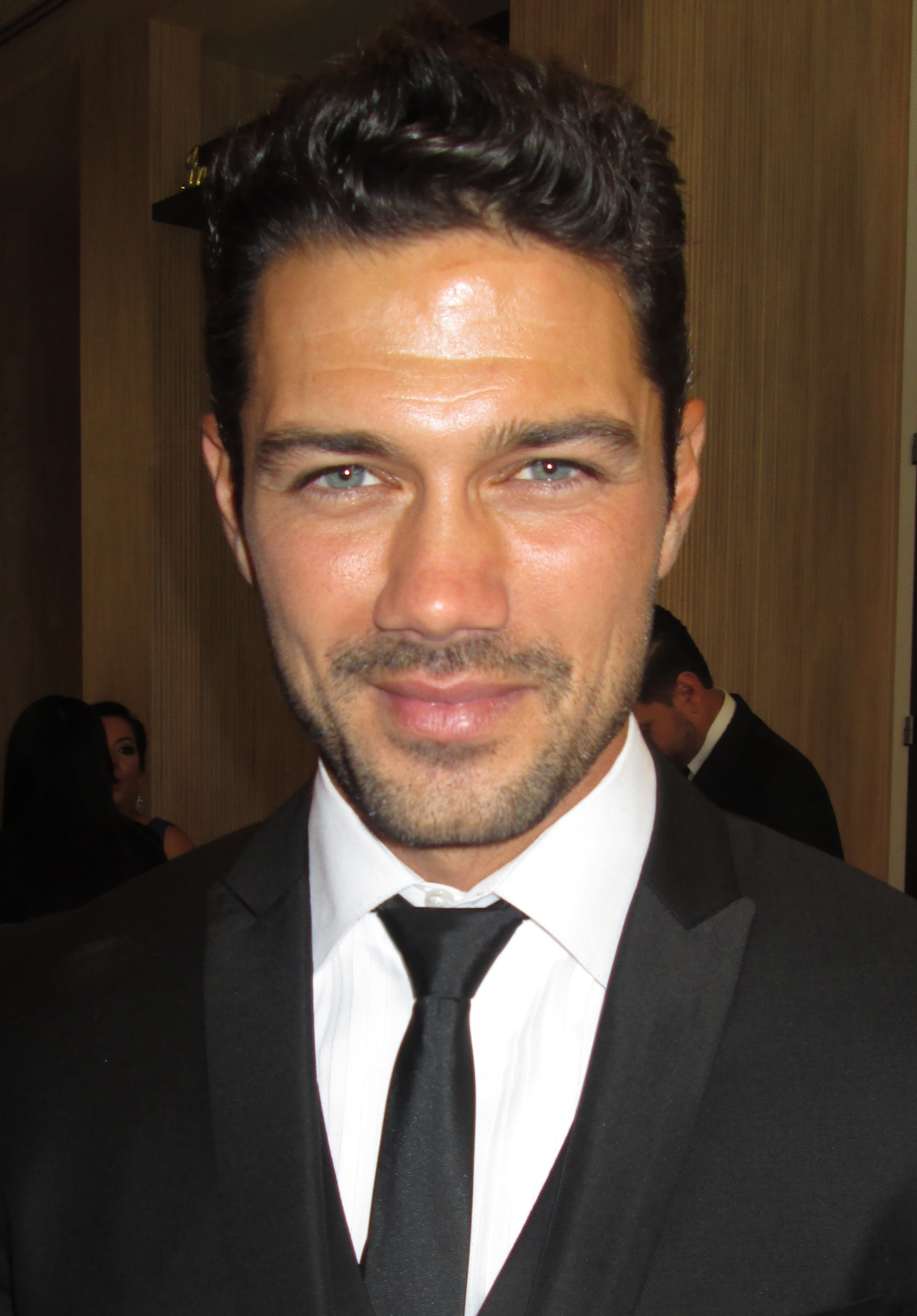
- Paevey in 2014
- Born: Ryan Jacob Paevey-Vlieger; September 24, 1984 (age 41); Torrance, California, U.S.
- Occupations: Actor; model
- Years active: 2011–present
- Height: 6 ft 1 in (1.85 m)

Ryan Paevey (/ˈpeɪvi/ PAY-vee; born Ryan Jacob Paevey-Vlieger; September 24, 1984) is an American actor and model. He is recognized for his role as Nathan West on the soap opera General Hospital, as well as starring in several Hallmark Channel movies.

== Early life ==
Paevey was born in Torrance, California, and was raised in Los Angeles as the son of Les Vlieger and Linda Paevey. Paevey ran track and cross country in high school.

Although Paevey did not plan to go into the entertainment industry, while in high school, he was scouted for modeling, leading to commercial acting. Paevey grew up working in construction with his father and bartending. Although he initially turned down modeling opportunities, he eventually acted on one.

== Career ==
As a model, Paevey worked opposite Katy Perry and Cher. He worked as a "body-double" for Robin Thicke for the music video of Thicke's "Sex Therapy". He worked in Christina Aguilera's 2012 music video for "Your Body". He worked for Izod. Paevey worked in a Corona commercial. While working as a model, Paevey was encouraged to try acting.

In December 2013, Paevey joined the cast of the ABC soap opera General Hospital in the contract role of Nathan West. The job was Paevey's first series regular role.

In October 2014, Paevey joined Extra as a guest co-host.

In 2015, Paevey starred as the lead in the Hallmark Channel original movie Unleashing Mr. Darcy, premiering on January 23, 2016.

In 2017, he starred in the Hallmark Channel movie Harvest Love and the Lifetime movie Locked In.

In 2018, he starred in the Hallmark Channel movies and Hope at Christmas.

In January 2018, Paevey announced his decision to depart General Hospital. He continued to act in several Hallmark films, including the Unleashing Mr. Darcy sequel, Marrying Mr. Darcy. His final film with the network was 2023's Under the Christmas Sky. In 2024, Paevey announced he was stepping away from acting to pursue other interests and move closer to his family.

In August 2025, it was announced Paevey was returning to General Hospital as Nathan; he began filming the week of August 18, with material beginning to air on September 19.

It was announced that Paevey would be in a Great American Family television film with Britt Robertson, Kevin Dillon, and Natasha Henstridge.

== Personal life ==
He has a motorcycle he named Lilith. In July 2015, Paevey injured his wrist in a motorcycle wreck.

In 2016, Paevey launched a brand called Fortunate Wanderer, selling custom prints of photography from his travels, hand-made jewelry, and outdoor gear.

His other hobbies include video games, surfing (which he did with his father as a child), and cooking, and his favorite food is sushi. Paevey speaks some French and Japanese and can read Japanese. He is of Dutch and Indonesian ancestry on his father's side. Paevey is a self-proclaimed "nature boy". He also briefly lived in Harlem and is very close with his younger sister Kaitlyn.

== Filmography ==
=== Film ===
Year	Film	Role	Notes
2016	Bogie and Bacall	Adlai Stevenson	Biographical drama film

=== Television ===
Year	Title	Role	Notes
2011	The Girl with the Gloves	Tom	Short
2012	4 Dead Girls: The Soul Taker	Jonathan	Television film
2012	Hollywood Heights	MK Bartender	4 episodes
2013	The Client List	Simon	Episode: "What Part of No?"
2013–18, 2025–Present	General Hospital	Nathan West; Cassius Faison	Contract role 280 episodes; 87 episodes
2014	Extra	Himself / co-host	Guest
2015	The View	Himself / co-host	Guest
2015	42nd Daytime Emmy Awards	Himself	Presenter for Outstanding Morning Program
2016	Unleashing Mr. Darcy	Donovan Darcy	Television film (Hallmark)
2017	Harvest Love	Will Nash	Television film (Hallmark)
2017	Locked In	Draven	Television film (Lifetime)
2018	Marrying Mr. Darcy	Donovan Darcy	Television film (Hallmark)
2018	Hope At Christmas	Mac	Television film (Hallmark Mystery)
2019	From Friend to Fiance	Ted Cooper	Television film (Hallmark)
2019	A Summer Romance	Richard Belmont	Television film (Hallmark)
2019	Christmas At The Plaza	Nick Perrelli	Television film (Hallmark)
2020	Matching Hearts	Daniel O'Connor	Television film (Hallmark)
2020	A Timeless Christmas	Charles Whitley	Television film (Hallmark)
2021	Don't Go Breaking My Heart	Ben	Television film (Hallmark)
2021	A Little Daytime Drama	Darin	Television film (Hallmark)
2021	Coyote Creek Christmas	Dylan Bailey	Television film (Hallmark)
2022	Two Tickets to Paradise	Josh Wyatt	Television film (Hallmark)
2022	A Fabled Holiday	Anderson	Television film (Hallmark)
2023	Fourth Down and Love	Mike Hanson	Television film (Hallmark)
2023	Under the Christmas Sky	David Robinson	Television film (Hallmark)
TBA	Christmas at Moose Lake	Sean	Television film (Great American Family)

=== Music Videos ===
Year	Music video	Artist	Role
2009	"Sex Therapy"	Robin Thicke	Body double for Thicke
2010	"Hands Tied"	Toni Braxton	Guy shooting pool
2012	"Your Body"	Christina Aguilera	Love interest
