= Satisfaction (Canadian TV series) =

- Genre: Sitcom
- Created by: Tim McAuliffe
- Starring: Luke Macfarlane; Leah Renee; Ryan Belleville; Pat Thornton
- Country of origin: Canada
- Original language: English
- No. of seasons: 1
- No. of episodes: 13

Production
- Executive producers: Tim McAuliffe; Michael Donovan
- Producers: Steven DeNure; Tracey Jardine; Jim Corston
- Production locations: Toronto, Ontario
- Cinematography: Ken Krawczyk
- Camera setup: Single
- Running time: 22 minutes
- Production companies: DHX Media; Lionsgate Television; Bell Media

Original release
- Network: CTV
- Release: June 24 – September 16, 2013

Satisfaction is a Canadian television sitcom, created by Tim McAuliffe, that debuted on CTV on June 24, 2013. Satisfaction was canceled after one season.

== Premise ==
The show centres on couple Jason (Luke Macfarlane) and Maggie (Leah Renee) and their roommate Mark (Ryan Belleville) as they try to seek some satisfaction in their lives. The series also features their neighbour Simon (Pat Thornton), Maggie's boss, former hockey player turned bar owner Doug St. Bruce (Thomas Mitchell), neighbour and cat enthusiast Bea (Nikki Payne), and single father Gary Breakfast (Mark Critch). The concept of the show comes from creator Tim McAuliffe's experiences as the single roommate while staying in an apartment with a couple.

Guest stars in the first season include Wendel Clark, Gordon Pinsent, Andy Kindler, Shaun Majumder, Gabrielle Miller, Jerry O'Connell, Tommy Chong, and Jessica Paré.

The series is filmed in Toronto, Ontario.

== Cast ==
- Luke Macfarlane as Jason Howell
- Leah Renee as Maggie Bronson
- Ryan Belleville as Mark Movenpick
- Mark Critch as Gary Breakfast
- Pat Thornton as Simon
- Thomas Mitchell as Doug St. Bruce
- Nikki Payne as Bea

== Episodes ==
No.	Title	Directed by	Written by	Original release date	Viewers (millions)
1	"The Blackout Cometh"	Steve Wright	Jason Belleville	June 24, 2013	0.524
A massive blackout leaves Jason and Maggie unable to settle an argument without the aid of the Internet. Mark has to race against time to save six months worth of thawing frozen food, and win back over the neighbours who have turned against him.
2	"The Internship, Relationship, Friendship"	James Dunnison	Tim Polley	July 1, 2013	N/A
Maggie convinces Mark to get his friend-with-benefits, Shannon (Natalie Lisinska), to get Maggie an internship at a marketing agency. Jason competes against Wendel Clark in a pub trivia contest.
3	"The Wind Beneath My Wingman"	James Dunnison	Tim McAuliffe	July 8, 2013	0.469
Jason meets an old friend from college who inspires him to not give up on his passion for music. Maggie tells Mark he needs to find a new wingman since Jason isn't available and Mark picks Simon.
4	"The Pot and The Pirate"	Steve Wright	Mark Critch	July 15, 2013	0.409
Maggie and Jason’s friends from the suburbs ask them to get some marijuana. Mark's new job requires him to see his doctor (Gordon Pinsent), who diagnoses him with scurvy.
5	"First Contact"	Keith Samples	Ryan Belleville	July 22, 2013	0.463
When Robyn (Jessica Paré) moves into the building Mark and Simon compete for her. Maggie and Jason go to a film festival and befirend another couple, Trevor (Shaun Majumder) and Denise (Gabrielle Miller). When Trevor informs them that they are polyamorous Maggie and Jason aren't sure if they want to partake or be offended by possibly being rejected.
6	"Penis Face Cat Funeral"	Keith Samples	Jenn Engels	July 29, 2013	N/A
Maggie realises she has become desensitised to the pain of others due to her obsession with French prank shows when she sees how others react to her sharing a video of Simon being scaled by an espresso machine. As part of her amends Maggie agrees to plan a funeral for Bea's recently deceased cat. Jason and Mark's old college nemesis David (Jerry O'Connell) invites them out for drinks. Mark's seizes upon his chance for revenge when David gets very drunk.
7	"Janet"	Shawn Alex Thompson	Tim McAuliffe	August 5, 2013	0.310
Jason and Maggie stumble into a discussion about the names of their possible future children. When Maggie says she wants a daughter named Janet in honour of her grandmother Jason is against it because no Janet he knows is a good person, especially his co-worker. Mark's suggestion to have Janet over for dinner backfires when Maggie and Janet learn they have a lot of things in common.
8	"Sunday Brunchy Sunday"	Shawn Alex Thompson	Tim Polley	August 12, 2013	0.410
As they try to find the perfect place for brunch Maggie begins to have doubts about whether Jason really cares what she does with her life.
9	"Mo Money, Mo Problems"	Jason Priestley	Mark Critch	August 19, 2013	0.627
10	"Confrontations"	Mike Clattenburg	Tim McAuliffe	August 26, 2013	0.423
11	"Fade To Blackened"	Keith Samples	Tim McAuliffe	September 2, 2013	0.352
12	"Daddy Issues"	Mike Clattenburg	Tim McAulife	September 9, 2013	0.485
13	"Save The Date"	Jason Priestley	Mark Critch	September 16, 2013	N/A

== Accolades ==
At the 2nd Canadian Screen Awards, Jason Priestley was nominated for Best Direction in a Comedy Program or Series. Mary Kirkland, Rupert Lazarus and Sean Breaugh were nominated for Best Production Design or Art Direction in a Fiction Program or Series.
