= Fourth Down and Love =

- Written by: Chevy Burnett; Shanda Lee Munson; Julie Sherman Wolfe
- Screenplay by: Julie Sherman Wolfe
- Directed by: Allan Harmon
- Starring: Pascale Hutton; Ryan Paevey; Sophia Powers; Dan Payne; Steve Bacic; Heather Doerksen
- Music by: Red Janes
- Country of origin: United States
- Original language: English

Production
- Producers: Doran Chandler; Alexandre Coscas; Michael R. Goldstein; Aidan Heatley; Ben C. Silverman; Randy Tat; Simon Richardson
- Cinematography: Dan Dumouchel
- Editor: Jason Hujber
- Running time: 84 minutes
- Production companies: Hallmark Media; Timeless Pictures; Basset Hound Distribution

Original release
- Network: Hallmark Channel
- Release: September 9, 2023

Fourth Down and Love is an American romantic comedy sports TV film that premiered September 9, 2023, on the Hallmark Channel. Directed by Allan Harmon, the film stars Pascale Hutton, Ryan Paevey, Sophia Powers, Dan Payne, Steve Bacic and Heather Doerksen.

The film was originally broadcast as part of the Hallmark Channel's "Fall Into Love" seasonal programming.

== Plot ==
Professional Whalers football player Mike Hanson gets seriously injured shortly after recovery from another injury, so must go into the injured reserve. Nursing broken ribs, he returns to his hometown to his brother Jimmy's. While there, Mike is convinced to assistant coach his niece Zoey's all-girl flag football team.

Single mother real estate agent Erin Allen's 12-year-old daughter Kira plays in the flag football league. One day, while sharing the field with another team during practice, Kira notices the all-girl flag football team. As her male teammates refuse to pass to her, she convinces Erin to help her join it.

Erin asks coach Jimmy to let Kira join, then realizes Mike, the college boyfriend she broke up with, is assistant coaching the all-girl team. Initially, they act awkwardly, but she watches over him so he does not strain his healing rib cage. Erin tells her real estate partner Georgina about seeing Mike, admitting she broke his heart.

Meanwhile, Jimmy and his wife Danielle pump Mike for details, which he insists there are none. Later, at the Whalers flag-football team's fundraiser, the coordinator is surprised that both Danielle and Erin offer to approach the football star for help, unaware of their connection to him.

Afterwards, the former introduces herself to the latter, explaining she is his sister-in-law. Erin says he is a college friend. Danielle invites her to a barbecue that evening.

When Erin and Kira arrive, Mike gets visibly nervous. Jimmy and Danielle find an excuse to leave them alone. When Grandma Gertie and her boyfriend appear, they are also encouraged to leave Erin and Mike alone.

Erin and Mike talk catch up. He is preoccupied about his future on The Whalers, due to the back-to-back injuries. Erin explains she became a full-time housewife when Kira was born, then her husband left her. So she and Georgina started their real estate business.

Attempting to talk about their college break up, Mike is obviously still upset and Erin will not explain herself. So, she suggests they keep their distance while he is here. They enter the house to tell Jimmy and Danielle.

Jimmy reveals the high school has offered him an assistant coach job, which he plans to take. However, he is concerned about the middle school flag football team. Erin and Mike talk privately and ultimately agree to try to be friends for the team.

Erin, with her kinesiology degree, constantly watches that Mike not hurt himself. After practice, as Jimmy and Danielle cannot get him, she and Kira give him a ride. Since they are having lasagna, Kira convinces Erin to invite Mike.

As Erin and Mike spend time together again, their romantic past feelings resurface. With Kira on a sleepover with her team, Mike invites the free Erin to a charity event at the local nursing home. They have a nice time, so the next day she is distracted at work, prompting Georgina to suggest she might be in love.

The girls' team reaches the final. As they start to play, Mike's manager Richard appears, saying he has been reinstated on the team, so must leave immediately to prepare to play the next day. Richard approaches Erin, complaining that she is distracting him from what is important, to hurry back to work. She reminds him he had already convinced her to walk away from Mike once, insisting it was his best option to be drafted.

As Michael leaves with Richard, he realizes he has blocked his relationship with Erin twice. By phone, he proposes a game-winning play to the flag team. Mike is reinstated on his team and in the last play, just as with the flag football team, he suggests they do a fake to win.

After the game, Richard criticizes Mike for not scoring the last goal. Mike reveals the team manager offered him to stay through the end of his career with a pay adjustment, which he accepted. Richard protests, so Mike states he is no longer his agent effective immediately.

Erin appears at the stadium, announcing she will be with him, regardless of his team. Mike happily informs her he will stay, finishing his career with the Whalers. They mutually declare their love, then kiss.

== Cast ==
- Pascale Hutton as Erin Allen
- Ryan Paevey as Mike Hanson
- Sophia Powers as Keira Allen
- Dan Payne as Jimmy Hanson
- Steve Bacic as Richard
- Heather Doerksen as Danielle Hanson
- Kalyn Miles as Georgina
- Darlene Tait as Gertie Hanson
- Fred Henderson as Gus
- Piper Scott as Zoey Hanson
- Ian Ronningen as Bucks Flag Coach
- Darby Steeves as Kristina
- Cole Fairbank as Lucas
- Aaron Joseph as Referee
- Gemma Martini as Whaler Team Doctor
- David Stuart as Whaler General Manager
- Kimberley Sustad as Sideline Reporter
- Benjamin Wilkinson as Announcer
- Adil Zaidi as Commentator

== Production ==
Principal photography took place entirely in Vancouver between May and June 2023. The football stadium used in the film was the McLeod Athletic Park in the Township of Langley.

== Reception ==
Fourth Down and Love debuted on the Hallmark Channel to 1.58 million viewers.

Southern Living presented the film as follows: "In addition to the rekindled romance, Mike bonds with the young women on the team and teaches them how to gain more confidence on and off the field." Decider compared the film with other productions, "There’s a lot of Hallmark’s Hearts in the Game here, especially the fact that the leads start as exes rather than strangers. If the movie focused more on the kids and Coach Mike, the pro-coaches-kids storyline could feel more Mighty Ducks-ish" and wrote that the film offered "no real surprises plot-wise and pretty much adheres to every trope you expect from both a Hallmark romance and a kid-centric sports movie."
