= Sandra Alland =

Scottish-Canadian writer, artist, publisher, performer, filmmaker and curator

Sandra Alland (also known as San Alland) is a Glasgow-based Scottish-Canadian writer, interdisciplinary artist, small press publisher, performer, filmmaker and curator. Alland's work focuses on social justice, language, humour, and experimental forms.

== Early life ==
Sandra Alland grew up in Scarborough, a suburb of Toronto, Ontario, Canada. They were brought up by a Scottish migrant father and grandfather, and a mother of French-Canadian and Dutch descent. The first in their family to attend university, Alland completed undergraduate studies in Drama at the University of Toronto, graduating with high distinction in 2000.

== Career ==
Sandra Alland began publishing and performing their work in Toronto in 1995. From 1995 to 1997, they were part of the performance poetry band Stumblin' Tongues, with Bermudian poet Andra Simons and musicians Garth and Grant Kien. Alland worked extensively in Toronto's theatre, literary and visual art communities until they relocated to Scotland in 2007.

Alland has published three collections of poetry: Proof of a Tongue (McGilligan Books, 2004), Blissful Times (BookThug, 2007). They have also published two chapbook of their short stories, Here's to Wang (Forest Publications) and Anything Not Measurable Is Not Real (Stuart Ross's Proper Tales Press). Their poetry chapbook Naturally Speaking, a meditation on disability poetics and gender, was published in 2012 by Toronto's espresso and was joint winner of the 2013 bpNichol Chapbook Award.

In a four-star performance review in December 2007, Edinburgh's The Skinny said: "(In) Sandra Alland's brilliant Beckett cut-ups...the images come so fast you sometimes feel like a Slinky falling down the stairs, yet the emotion and intention are clear, moving, and often funny." In the spring of 2009, Glasgow's Lock Up Your Daughters magazine said: "Reminiscent of Miranda July and complemented by a deadpan delivery, Alland's words are at once both drolly funny and sweetly strange."

In 2017, Alland co-edited Stairs and Whispers: D/deaf and Disabled Poets Write Back (Nine Arches Press). Alland's writing has been published internationally in anthologies including Protest: Stories of Resistance (Comma Press), Thought X: Fictions and Hypotheticals (Comma Press), The Mirror in the Mirror (Comma Press), The State of the Arts: Living with Culture in Toronto (Coach House Books), radiant danse uv being: A Poetic Portrait of bill bissett (blewointment), Red Light: Superheroes, Saints, and Sluts (Arsenal Pulp Press), My Lump in the Bed: Love Poems for George W. Bush (Dwarf Puppets on Parade), Can't Lit: Fearless Fiction from Broken Pencil Magazine, and Poems For Pussy Riot (PEN International). Alland's poems and short stories can be found in such publications as This Magazine, Broken Pencil, dig, Cosmonauts Avenue, subTerrain and Gutter. In 2012, Alland edited a feature on Scottish poetry for Jacket2.

Besides text, Alland works in multimedia, film, performance poetry and sound poetry. They currently collaborates with the Scottish interdisciplinary group They They Theys, who received 5 stars from Scotland's The Skinny in March 2014. From 2007 to 2012, Alland collaborated with the poetry-music-video fusion group Zorras. In the autumn of 2009, Scotland's ultimatemetal.com said of their work: "A very unique mix of poetry, music, stories and just plain weird. The poetry was sharp and funny, the placement effective, the visuals fitting; a rather unforgettable experience." Alland is featured in Andrea Brady's Archive of the Now (Queen Mary).

In the UK, Alland has performed at such places as The Roundhouse, Barbican Centre, Edinburgh International Book Festival, Museum of London, Soho Theatre, The Oxford Playhouse, Aye Write!, The Arches, The Forest, and Unity Theatre, Liverpool. In Canada, they have featured at series including Impossible Words, AvantGarden, Mayworks Festival of Working People and the Arts, Contact Photography Festival, the Ottawa International Writers' Festival, LabCab Festival (Factory Theatre), Bi+ Arts Festival, and Hillside Festival.

Alland's visual art and videos were on display at Glasgow's Gallery of Modern Art and mac (Birmingham), during 2009–2010 and 2011 respectively. Along with Ajamu X, Alland was the inaugural artist-in-residence at Glasgow's Trongate 103 in 2009.

Alland's films have screened internationally, including at Tate Modern, Macrobert, Entzaubert Festival (Berlin), Entr'2 Marches, and MIX Copenhagen. In 2013, they were awarded a Cultural Commissions grant from Creative Scotland and LGBT History Month Scotland, to begin work on new documentary shorts, and to mentor six new LGBTQ disabled and Deaf filmmakers. In 2016–2017, Alland was commissioned by Disability Arts Online and SICK! Festival to curate a playlist of films about D/deaf and disabled artists, and co-create five new short documentaries.

Alland has curated projects and events for entities including Edinburgh Filmhouse, Disability Arts Online, Artscape's Queen West Art Crawl, This Ain't the Rosedale Library, Toronto Women's Bookstore, and The Theatre Centre. They founded and curates Edinburgh's Cachín Cachán Cachunga! and SEEP, a multimedia performance and visual arts project featuring queer, trans and intersex artists. In 2018, Alland curated the first widely-accessible short film programme featuring queer and trans D/deaf and disabled artists at BFI Flare, called Fighters of Demons, Makers of Cakes.

== Personal life ==
Alland is queer, disabled, genderqueer, and working poor.

== Works ==
Books

- 2000: The Mathematics of Love. Toronto: 13th Tiger Press
- 2004: Proof of a Tongue. Toronto: McGilligan Books
- 2007: Blissful Times. Toronto: BookThug
- 2009: Here's to Wang. Edinburgh: Forest Publications
- 2012: Naturally Speaking. Toronto: espresso
- 2017: Stairs and Whispers: D/deaf and Disabled Poets Write Back. Rugby: Nine Arches Press. Eds Alland, Barokka, Sluman.
- 2019: Anything Not Measurable Is Not Real. Cobourg: Proper Tales Press
- 2020: Anything Not Measurable Is Not Real audiobook and film-stories. Glasgow: Canada Council for the Arts.
- 2021: Sore Loser: a chronic pain and illness zine on queer disabled loss (co-authored with Etzali Hernández). Glasgow: Disability Arts Online.

Performance works

- 2000: "The Man" (Waterspout Theatre, Bermuda)
- 2002: "Body Geometry: A Good Night Out" (The Theatre Centre, Toronto)
- 2002: "Seeing Each Other" (with Heather Lash, New York Fringe, New York)
- 2005: "Poetry Is Not A Luxury" (with Anna Camilleri & Karen Miranda Augustine, Mayworks Festival, Toronto)
- 2005: "Other Me" (with Alejandra Perez-Gomez, Scream Festival, Toronto)
- 2009: "Found In Translation" (Soho Theatre, produced by Oxford Playhouse, London)
- 2009: "The Eruption of Kilauea and Other Treasures" (Screen Bandita, Filmhouse & Scottish Documentary Institute, Edinburgh)
- 2014: "SEEP: Fluidity in Body and Landscape" (with They They Theys, media education, Edinburgh)
- 2014: "Who's Your Dandy?" (with They They Theys, Filmhouse, Edinburgh)
- 2016: "Equivalence" (Transpose, Barbican Centre, London / Anatomy, Summerhall, Edinburgh)
- 2017: "Equivalence" (Edinburgh Filmhouse)

Albums

- 2009: "We Apologise For Any Inconvenience" (with Zorras, Minor Assault Records)
- 2012: "Doctor Says" (with Zorras, Minor Assault Records)

Exhibitions

- 2002: "Play" (Pteros Gallery/Contact Photography Festival, solo show, Toronto)
- 2009–2010: "A Spot of b)other" (Glasgow Gallery of Modern Art, lead artist, Glasgow)
- 2011: "A Spot of b)other" (Midlands Arts Centre, lead artist, Birmingham)
- 2012: "After Going Out" (Tate Modern, Tracey Moberly's Tweet Me Up, London)
- 2012: "Trans*Homo" (with Justin Time, Schwules Museum, Berlin)
- 2014: "SEEP: Fluidity in Body and Landscape" (media education, group show, Edinburgh)
- 2014: "SEEP II: Mirrors & Mires" (Patriothall Gallery, group show, Edinburgh)

Screening highlights

- 2013: "I'm Not Your Inspiration" (macrobert, Stirling)
- 2014: "I'm Not Your Inspiration 1, 2, 3" (Entzaubert Film Festival, Berlin)
- 2015–2016: "Fingers" (British Film Institute Love Season, UK-wide)
- 2017: "I'm Not Your Inspiration 1, 2, 3 & 4" (Malmo Queer Film Festival, Malmo)
- 2018: "Long Lost Lover" (with Ania Urbanowska, Entr'2 Marches, Cannes)
- 2019: "Able"/"I'm Not Your Inspiration" (Queer City Cinema, Regina)
- 2021: "Water,logged" (Kinesthesia Festival, Middlesex)
- 2022: "Able" (VIII Bienal de Arte Contemporáneo, ONCE, Madrid)

Awards

- 2013: bpNichol Chapbook Award (co-winner, Meet the Presses, Toronto)
- 2013: Cultural Commission Award (LGBT History Month Scotland / Creative Scotland)
- 2016–2017: Viewfinder Commission (Disability Arts Online, Brighton)
- 2020: Canada Council Digital Originals (audiobook and film-stories, Glasgow)
- 2021-23: Locked World Commission (Birds of Paradise Theatre, Glasgow)
