= SurrealEstate =

- Genre: Paranormal drama
- Created by: George R. Olson
- Starring: Tim Rozon; Sarah Levy; Adam Korson; Maurice Dean Wint; Savannah Basley; Tennille Read; Elena Juatco
- Country of origin: Canada
- Original language: English
- No. of seasons: 3
- No. of episodes: 30

Production
- Production locations: St. John's, Newfoundland and Labrador, Canada
- Running time: 43 minutes
- Production companies: GRO; Take the Shot Productions; Blue Ice Pictures; Bell Media Studios; Leonine Studios

Original release
- Network: CTV Sci-Fi Channel
- Release: July 16, 2021 – June 5, 2025

SurrealEstate is a Canadian paranormal drama television series that premiered on July 16, 2021, on CTV Sci-Fi Channel in Canada and Syfy in the United States. The second season premiered on October 4, 2023, and the third season premiered on April 3, 2025. In December 2025, the series was canceled after three seasons.

== Premise ==
Real estate agent Luke Roman and an elite team of specialists handle the cases that no one else can: haunted and possessed houses that literally scare would-be buyers away.

== Cast and characters ==
=== Main ===
- Tim Rozon as Luke Roman, the head of a real estate agency which deals with haunted houses
- Sarah Levy as Susan Ireland, a new agent of the Roman Agency. She's a people person, acting as the agency's public relations. It's later revealed during the first season that she has telekinetic and pyrokinetic powers. In the second season, she becomes a partner in the Roman Agency.
- Adam Korson as Phil Orley (seasons 1–2), a paranormal researcher and former Catholic priest
- Maurice Dean Wint as August Ripley, a technology specialist who does the designs and the construction. He also studies how architecture connects with supernatural energy.
- Savannah Basley as Zooey L'Enfant, the front desk manager. In the third season, she leaves the agency to attend law school.
- Tennille Read as Megan Donovan, the victim of a haunted house tied to Roman
- Elena Juatco as Clytemnestra Lomax (seasons 2–3), a former mortician who joins the Roman Agency as an agent

=== Recurring ===
- Jennifer Dale as Victoria Roman (season 1; guest seasons 2–3), Luke's estranged mother
- Art Hindle as Carl Roman (season 1; guest season 2), Luke's deceased father
- Alison Brooks as Rita Weiss, the head of a competing real estate agency, who has a rivalry with Luke
- Paul Ewan Wilson as Anthony Tamblyn (seasons 1–2), Phil's husband
- Joy Tanner as Rochelle Decker (seasons 2–3), a scientist and August's former colleague/old flame
- R. Austin Ball as Tyler MacNeil (season 3), the owner of a chain of retirement homes who becomes host to a supernatural nemesis of Luke's
- James Allodi as Lloyd (season 3), a bartender
- Jessika Mathurin as Vonda Banks (season 3)
- Karen Knox as Seven (season 3)
- Alex Ozerov-Meyer as Thornton "Tag" Guinness (season 3), a researcher at the Roman-Ireland Agency
- Stephen Huszar as Charles "Crash" Newberg (season 3)

=== Guest ===
- Alison Woolridge as Constance (seasons 1–2)
- Melanie Scrofano as Harper North (season 1)
- Jefferson Brown as Bob Livingston
- Varun Saranga as Zayan Wali (season 2)

== Episodes ==
=== Series overview ===
Season	Episodes	Originally released		Average viewership
Season	Episodes	First released	Last released	Average viewership
1	10	July 16, 2021	September 17, 2021	314,000
2	10	October 4, 2023	December 6, 2023	180,000
3	10	April 3, 2025	June 5, 2025	150,000

=== Season 1 (2021) ===
No. overall	No. in season	Title	Directed by	Written by	Original release date	U.S. viewers (millions)
1	1	"Pilot"	Paul Fox	George R. Olson	July 16, 2021	0.50
The Roman Agency welcomes a new agent, as well as a new client with a connection to Luke's past.
2	2	"The Harvey"	Paul Fox	George R. Olson	July 23, 2021 (Note: This episode was first released on Video on Demand on July 16, 2021.)	0.33
A little boy's "imaginary friend" interferes with his parents' plans to sell their house and move.
3	3	"For Sale by Owner"	Danishka Esterhazy	Ramona Barckert	July 30, 2021	0.25
A lovely lake cabin may be haunted or the owner may be faking; a horror novelist seeks inspiration.
4	4	"A House Is Not a Home"	Danishka Esterhazy	Duana Taha	August 6, 2021	0.32
The Roman Agency takes on a haunted master-planned subdivision and a troubled house by the sea.
5	5	"Ft. Ghost Child"	Melanie Scrofano	Gillian Müller	August 13, 2021	0.26
When a rap star rents a client's recording studio, a tragic secret is revealed in the playback.
6	6	"Roman's Six"	Melanie Scrofano	Duana Taha	August 20, 2021	0.34
The Roman Agency steps in when the visitors to a competitor's Open House are murdered one by one.
7	7	"Quarantine"	Danishka Esterhazy	George R. Olson	August 27, 2021	0.28
The team locks down in the office to isolate and destroy a murderous demon that followed them home.
8	8	"Baba O'Riley"	Danishka Esterhazy	Ramona Barckert	September 3, 2021	0.25
As Luke considers quitting paranormal clients, he encounters a house that changes his perspective.
9	9	"White Wedding"	Paolo Barzman	Gillian Müller	September 10, 2021	0.28
Susan works to keep a dream wedding from becoming a nightmare, and the Donovan House strikes back.
10	10	"The House Always Wins"	Paolo Barzman	George R. Olson	September 17, 2021	0.35
The Donovan House confronts Luke and the team with their deepest losses and greatest regrets.

=== Season 2 (2023) ===
No. overall	No. in season	Title	Directed by	Written by	Original release date	U.S. viewers (millions)
11	1	"Trust the Process"	Danishka Esterhazy	George R. Olson	October 4, 2023	0.14
Luke struggles to handle an engaged property; Susan falls in love with a home with a special power.
12	2	"Truth in Advertising"	Danishka Esterhazy	Thomas Pepper	October 11, 2023	0.16
Luke deals with a film crew at a client's property, while Susan investigates a strange seaside B&B.
13	3	"The Butler Didn't"	Danishka Esterhazy	Duana Taha	October 18, 2023	0.16
When a client is held hostage by a ghost, The Roman Agency must hurry to save him.
14	4	"I Put a Spell on You"	Danishka Esterhazy	Gillian Müller	October 25, 2023	0.13
Luke spars with a homeowner during negotiations as Zooey takes on her first sales call.
15	5	"Art & Science"	John Vatcher	Thomas Pepper	November 1, 2023	0.14
Luke must improvise when a client's home traps her inside; August pays a visit to his past.
16	6	"Set Your Flag on Fire"	John Vatcher	Duana Taha	November 8, 2023	0.24
A neighborly conflict draws the agency into a feud; Phil's sister arrives to settle the family will.
17	7	"God & Monsters"	John Vatcher	George R. Olson	November 15, 2023	0.23
Luke helps a client confront the monster under his childhood bed; a new agent joins the Agency.
18	8	"Let Sleeping Dogs Lie"	John Vatcher	Duana Taha	November 22, 2023	0.21
Luke reconnects with his estranged mother, Zooey investigates Susan's disappearance.
19	9	"Dearly Departed"	Melanie Scrofano	Gillian Müller	November 29, 2023	0.20
The Agency must guide a ghost into the light; Susan is found.
20	10	"Letting Go"	Melanie Scrofano	George R. Olson	December 6, 2023	0.20
A changed Susan returns to the Agency; Luke must use his regained powers to save the team.

=== Season 3 (2025) ===
No. overall	No. in season	Title	Directed by	Written by	Original release date	U.S. viewers (millions)
21	1	"Buckaroo"	Paolo Barzman	George R. Olson	April 3, 2025	0.13
22	2	"Night Terrors"	Paolo Barzman	Justin Rawana	April 10, 2025	0.20
23	3	"Death Does a Refi"	Paolo Barzman	George R. Olson	April 17, 2025	N/A
24	4	"A Family Thing"	Paolo Barzman	Hannah Cheesman	April 24, 2025	0.14
25	5	"The Gardener"	Paolo Barzman	Justin Rawana	May 1, 2025	N/A
26	6	"Battleground"	T.W. Peacocke	George R. Olson	May 8, 2025	0.10
27	7	"A Slice of Afterlife"	T.W. Peacocke	Hannah Cheesman	May 15, 2025	N/A
28	8	"Perchance to Dream"	T.W. Peacocke	Thomas Pepper	May 22, 2025	N/A
29	9	"Grave Matters"	T.W. Peacocke	George R. Olson	May 29, 2025	0.17
30	10	"The Elephant in the Room"	T.W. Peacocke	George R. Olson	June 5, 2025	0.17

== Production ==
The series, produced by Blue Ice Pictures was first announced in 2020, originally under the working title The Surrealtor, and was shot in St. John's, Newfoundland and Labrador. Tim Rozon was cast in the lead role of Luke Roman; he previously starred in Wynonna Earp for four seasons (2016–2021), with Melanie Scrofano in the title role, and she joined his new production as a director for two episodes (and one guest appearance) in the first season. Rozon also appeared in the main cast of Schitt's Creek, alongside Sarah Levy; Levy stars with Rozon in the main cast of SurrealEstate, in the role of Susan Ireland.

In October 2021, series creator George Olsen announced that Syfy had canceled the series after one season, adding that he would attempt to find a new home for the series. In May 2022, it was announced that Syfy had reversed its decision, renewing the series for a second season. In February 2024, it was announced that Syfy had renewed the series for a third season.

On December 16, 2025, showrunner George R. Olson confirmed that the series had been canceled after three seasons.

== Release ==
The first season premiered on July 16, 2021, on CTV Sci-Fi Channel and Syfy. The second season premiered on October 4, 2023. The third season premiered on April 3, 2025.

In March 2022, it was announced that Leonine Studios had sold the rights to the series to more than 160 territories.
