= The Desperate Hour =

2021 American-Canadian film

- Theatrical release poster
- Directed by: Phillip Noyce
- Written by: Chris Sparling
- Produced by: Andrew D. Corkin, Chris Sparling, Alex Lalonde, Zack Schiller, David Boies, Naomi Watts, Chris Parker, Dylan Sellers
- Starring: Naomi Watts
- Cinematography: John Brawley
- Edited by: Lee Haugen
- Music by: Fil Eisler
- Production companies: Untapped, Boies / Schiller Entertainment, Limelight
- Distributed by: Vertical Entertainment, Roadside Attractions
- Release dates: September 12, 2021 (TIFF); February 25, 2022 (USA)
- Running time: 84 minutes
- Countries: United States, Canada
- Language: English

The Desperate Hour is a 2021 thriller film directed by Phillip Noyce and written by Chris Sparling. It stars Naomi Watts as a woman who is desperately racing to save her child after police place her hometown on lockdown due to an active shooter incident. The film was shot in the North Bay area of Ontario in 2020. It premiered under its original title Lakewood at the 2021 Toronto International Film Festival. The Desperate Hour was theatrically released by Roadside Attractions and Vertical Entertainment on February 25, 2022.

== Plot ==
The recently widowed and emotionally unstable mother Amy, who is dependent on her smartphone, decides to take a personal day off work. She waves goodbye to her young daughter, Emily, who boards a school bus, but discovers her teenaged son, Noah, still in bed, complaining he's ill. Amy takes a jog through the woods, navigating through several routine calls while running. Shortly after meeting several police cars traveling hurriedly, Amy receives a bulletin on her cell phone reporting all area schools are in lockdown.

Desperately trying to find out more info, Amy places several calls, the combination of which gradually allow her to piece together details. She learns there is an active shooter at the high school who has taken the life of a girl. Further, she concludes Noah is not home, but instead went to the high school after his truck is seen in the parking lot. A mechanic, whose shop is near the school, tells Amy the police are searching Noah's truck. He later adds that four other vehicles, besides Noah's, are also being searched. A police officer, via a 911 dispatcher, asks Amy questions about Noah which leads her to wonder if Noah is the school shooter. In a subsequent call, the police tell Amy that Noah is not the shooter, and the shooter is not a student.

Amy eventually makes her way to the highway where she meets a Lyft driver who takes her to the high school. Along the way, Amy calls the shooter's cell number which her boss surreptitiously retrieved. The shooter answers but hangs up after a brief exchange. Amy discovers the shooter is a former employee of the school. The police call Amy, chiding her for calling the shooter and disrupting their negotiation efforts. Noah calls Amy, but the call is short and Noah is under obvious stress. The police call Amy back asking if she can, again, call the shooter, hoping she can distract him so the police can breach the room where the hostages are located.

Amy arrives at the scene and during her brief call to the shooter, she hears gunfire and loses contact with both the shooter and Noah. Standing by the police barricades at the school's perimeter, Amy sees Noah emerge and the two are joyfully reunited. On the trip home, Amy's mother calls and tells Amy she is picking up Emily. Noah makes a social media post in which he denounces school shootings and encourages his audience to courageously fight against them.

== Cast ==
- Naomi Watts as Amy
- Colton Gobbo as Noah
- Andrew Chown as Robert Ellis
- Sierra Maltby as Emily
- David Reale as CJ
- Josh Bowman as Emergency Police
- Edie Mirman as Amy's Mother
- Paul Pape as Lyft Driver
- Ellen Dubin as Sergeant Brandt
- Zehra Fazal as News Reporter
- Alex Paxton-Beesley as Off-Screen Reader

== Reception ==
On the review aggregator website Rotten Tomatoes, 28% of 78 critics' reviews are positive, with an average rating of 4.5/10. The website's consensus reads: "Naomi Watts gives it her all, but The Desperate Hour falls short as a thriller as well as social commentary." Metacritic, which uses a weighted average, assigned the film a score of 35 out of 100, based on 24 critics, indicating "generally unfavorable" reviews.

Reviewer Shubhabrata Dutta of Digital Mafia Talkies described The Desperate Hour as "a film that is based almost completely on phone conversations".
