= Everything's Going to Be Great =

- Theatrical release poster
- Directed by: Jon S. Baird
- Written by: Steven Rogers
- Produced by: Alex Lalonde; Bryan Unkeless; Steven Rogers
- Starring: Allison Janney; Benjamin Evan Ainsworth; Bryan Cranston; Jack Champion; Simon Rex; Chris Cooper
- Cinematography: Mark Wolf
- Edited by: Steven Worsley
- Music by: Rolfe Kent
- Production companies: eOne; Amaze Film & Television; Screen Arcade
- Distributed by: Lionsgate
- Release dates: June 9, 2025 (Tribeca Festival); June 20, 2025 (United States)
- Running time: 95 minutes
- Countries: United States; Canada
- Language: English

Everything's Going to Be Great is a 2025 comedy-drama film directed by Jon S. Baird and written by Steven Rogers. It stars Allison Janney, Benjamin Evan Ainsworth, Bryan Cranston and Jack Champion. Filming began in April 2023.

The film premiered at the Tribeca Festival on June 9, 2025, and was released in the United States on June 20, 2025.

== Plot ==
In 1989, Macy and Buddy Smart, along with their sons Derrick and Lester, run a live theater company and venue in Akron, Ohio. Lester, an outcast in his middle school who prefers classy outfits, often imagines conversations with deceased drama legends like Noël Coward and frequently disrupts live performances, frustrating the stage manager. Buddy has ambitions to manage two theaters, with plans to eventually move to Milwaukee and larger cities. One evening at dinner, he shares this idea and calls for the family to vote on it. Derrick, an athlete, opposes the plan, reluctant to leave his girlfriend Annabeth and his spot on the school football team. The rest of the family supports it, particularly Lester, who aspires to succeed in New York’s theater scene.

After the move to the new theater, Buddy struggles to bring in audiences. This brings friction to Macy, who has been worn down by daily life and Buddy’s relentless drive, which often fails to meet her emotional needs. He remains fixated on her past as a beauty queen. However, the family’s fortunes improves after Buddy, previously agnostic, appears to embrace multiple faiths and solicits their congregations to subscribe to shows, doubling attendance. One day, Lester accidentally witnesses Macy in an extramarital encounter with an actor in the company. Distressed, he runs away, with Macy running after him. She catches up right as they reach Buddy, who is holding a phone, stunned by an offer to manage a theater in Milwaukee.

Too excited to notice Macy and Lester’s distress, Buddy leaves to buy champagne to celebrate. He collapses and dies of a heart attack in a convenience store, despite a prior warning from his doctor to retire due to a heart condition. Having wagered everything they have on the new theater, the family now has no place to live. They are forced to move in with Macy's brother Walter on his farm in Kansas.

In their new school, Lester overhears Derrick complaining about the theater work their parents used to force him to do. Derrick belittles Buddy as well as the family's past performances and Lester, unable to stand it, confronts him. The brothers scuffle and Lester declares that in five years he will make it in New York. Meanwhile Macy struggles with Buddy's sudden death. She laments Buddy's refusal to have a back-up plan, begins losing faith in her religion and takes to drinking in secret.

Later that night, Derrick hangs out with a girl, Selena, in his car. He uses a pick up line that Buddy once told him, and breaks down in grief. The next day, Selena, who previously has bonded with Lester and starts to sit with him in the cafeteria, joins Derrick and his friends instead, leaving Lester to sit alone. When called to school to discuss Lester's behavior, Macy arrives drunk. Walter reveals that he stopped talking to Macy because she eloped with Buddy, and advises Lester to stop paying attention to what others think of him and to make up with Derrick.

The brothers eventually do, with Derrick revealing that he ignores Lester at school because he believes that Lester will become successful without needing to fit in unlike himself. On Macy's birthday, she receives package containing a bible that Lester claims to have seen Buddy purchased before. It was a trick, as Lester bought the bible himself and sent it via post with the help of the family's old theater director. Still, it lifts Macy's spirit out of her depressive state to think that Buddy's soul had been saved.

Macy finds stability with Lester, encouraging him to pursue his dreams fully. She takes on a managerial role at a New Jersey theater, initially staging only Neil Simon plays. Derrick eventually gets to focus to friends and football, leaving the theater. Lester helps Macy at the theater and begins imagining advice from Buddy.

== Cast ==
- Allison Janney as Macy Smart
- Benjamin Evan Ainsworth as Lester Smart
- Bryan Cranston as Buddy Smart
- Jack Champion as Derrick Smart
- Simon Rex as Kyle
- Chris Cooper as Walter

== Production ==
In March 2023, it was revealed that a drama film titled Everything's Going to Be Great was in development, with Jon S. Baird directing and Steven Rogers writing the screenplay. Benjamin Evan Ainsworth was cast as Lester Smart, while Bryan Cranston, Allison Janney and Jack Champion joined the cast in undisclosed roles. Simon Rex and Chris Cooper were added to the cast in May.

The film was produced by Alex Lalonde, Bryan Unkeless, and Steven Rogers.

=== Filming ===
Principal photography began on April 21, 2023, in North Bay, Ontario. Filming had wrapped on May 25, 2023.

== Release ==
Everything's Going to Be Great premiered at the Tribeca Festival on June 9, 2025, before a very limited theatrical release in the United States on June 20, 2025.

== Reception ==
On the review aggregator website Rotten Tomatoes, 55% of 33 critics' reviews are positive. The website's consensus reads: "Everything's Going to Be Great almost bows under the weight of its confused conceit, yet hearty performances by Brian Cranston and Allison Janney keep it afloat." Metacritic, which uses a weighted average, assigned the film a score of 54 out of 100, based on 10 critics, indicating "mixed or average" reviews.

Cortlyn Kelly of RogerEbert.com gave the film three out of four stars. She wrote that Baird and Rogers "come together to craft a witty and sharp script and present mostly well-rounded characters, enhanced by timely delivery. What really stands out in their script is the devotion to one's craft and calling, and seeing how certain artistic inclinations, in some ways, feel as if they are genetically passed down."

However, Owen Gleiberman of Variety wrote, "Everything's Going to Be Great is a ramble, an unconvincing grab bag, a domestic tall tale with too much stuffed into it." He also wrote that it "is one of those glorified sitcoms pretending to be a real movie."
