= Madly Off in All Directions =

Madly Off in All Directions was a Canadian radio comedy show that aired for several years on CBC Radio One, featuring comedian Lorne Elliott. It formerly aired on Sunday afternoons at 1PM (1:30PM in Newfoundland and Labrador), as well as on Saturday evenings on 6:30PM with repeats on Friday mornings at 11 AM. It was replaced in September 2006 by a comedy show The Debaters.

The show travelled around Canada, recording in front of a live audience at various local venues. The show provided a mix of stand-up, improvisational, sketch, and musical comedy. Elliott usually began the show with a monologue, and introduced the acts that followed, often comedians who were local to the area, who were given the chance of national exposure through the program.

Elliott's work first caught the attention of CBC with the airing of one of his concert performances on Definitely Not the Opera. He also did additional comedy segments for other CBC radio shows, including Basic Black, Sunday Showcase and Morningside. He was given the retiring Royal Canadian Air Farce's traditional radio show timeslot in 1996, and the show became a regular weekly showcase of Canadian comedy.

The name of the show was derived from a line used by famous Canadian humourist Stephen Leacock in his story "Gertrude the Governess". ("Lord Ronald said nothing; he flung himself from the room, flung himself upon his horse and rode madly off in all directions.") This phrase was both literally and figuratively applicable, as the show travelled across Canada, and the host and his guests covered the full range of the comedy spectrum.

There were two years that the format was changed, and Elliott travelled exclusively to smaller venues, accompanied only by Derek Edwards. These tours were intended to be more intimate affairs, and also served as a bit of a break for Elliott, as the pared-down format required much less planning and arranging.

After a summer series consisting of repeats in 2006, the show was quietly replaced by The Debaters in its former timeslots. Beginning in April 2007, further repeats of the show were broadcast Monday afternoons on CBC Radio One.

== Discography ==
- Lorne Elliott: Selections From All Directions (Vol.1)
- Lorne Elliott: Selections From All Directions (Vol.2)
