= Benjamin Evan Ainsworth =

English actor (born 2008)

- Born: 25 September 2008 (age 18); Nottingham, Nottinghamshire, England
- Occupation: Actor
- Years active: 2018–present

Benjamin Evan Ainsworth (born 25 September 2008) is an English actor. His credits include The Haunting of Bly Manor (2020), Flora & Ulysses (2021), Pinocchio (2022), Son of a Critch (2022–present), All Fun and Games (2023), and House of the Dragon (2026). He is set to star as Link in an upcoming film adaptation of The Legend of Zelda.

== Early life and education ==
While growing up in the village of Lund, Ainsworth attended the Northern Lights Drama Theatre School in Hull. His younger sister Erin Ainsworth also acts.

== Career ==
At the age of ten, Ainsworth made his television debut in the ITV soap opera Emmerdale in 2018, and in the same year performed in a production of Priscilla, Queen of the Desert on board the Norwegian Epic cruise liner.

Two years later, Ainsworth debuted in his first major production as Miles in the Netflix series The Haunting of Bly Manor (2020), a continuation of the series The Haunting of Hill House. Ainsworth starred in the Disney film Flora & Ulysses, which was released on Disney+ in 2021. In 2022, he voiced the title character in the live-action Disney film Pinocchio. Also that year, Ainsworth began portraying Mark Critch in the semi-autobiographical Canadian comedy series Son of a Critch, for which he received a Best Leading Performance in a Comedy Series nomination at the 12th Canadian Screen Awards.

In 2025, Ainsworth starred in Everything's Going to Be Great. That same year, it was announced that he would star as Link in an upcoming film adaptation of The Legend of Zelda. In 2026, Ainsworth portrayed Daeron Targaryen in the third season of House of the Dragon.

== Filmography ==
Key
†	Denotes works that have not yet been released

=== Film ===
Year	Title	Role	Notes	Ref.
2020	The Recycling Man	Jacob	Short	
2021	Flora & Ulysses	William Spiver		
2022	Pinocchio	Pinocchio (voice)		
2023	All Fun and Games	Jonah "Jo" Fletcher		
2025	Everything's Going to Be Great	Lester Smart		
2027	The Legend of Zelda †	Link	Post-production	
2027	Blood on Snow †		Post-production	

=== Television ===
Year	Title	Role	Notes
2018	Emmerdale	School boy	Episode #8125
2020	The Haunting of Bly Manor	Miles Wingrave	Main role
2022–present	Son of a Critch	Mark Critch	Main role and Executive Producer of S5
2022	The Sandman	Young Alex Burgess	Episode: "Sleep of the Just"
2026	House of the Dragon	Daeron Targaryen	Main role; 7 episodes
