= Buddy Wasisname and the Other Fellers =

Canadian musical and comedy trio

- Origin: Newfoundland and Labrador, Canada
- Genres: folk, comedy
- Years active: 1983–present
- Labels: Third Wave Productions, World Records
- Members: Kevin Blackmore; Wayne Chaulk; Ray Johnson; Byron Pardy
- Website: www.buddywasisname.com

Buddy Wasisname and the Other Fellers (sometimes stylized as "Buddy Wasisname & The Other Fellers", though the official name does not contain the "&" symbol) is a musical and comedy trio from Newfoundland and Labrador, founded in 1983 and composed of Kevin Blackmore ("Buddy Wasisname"), Wayne Chaulk, Byron Pardy and Ray Johnson ("The Other Fellers"). The group specializes in Newfoundland and folk music, and performs comedic skits and stand-up routines.

Chaulk performs on bass or guitar, Johnson on accordion or fiddle, and Blackmore on mandolin, fiddle, banjo, guitar, and improvised percussion instruments including Tupperware lids and garbage bags. Byron Pardy performs on bass and backing vocals. All three musicians sing and write songs which reflect their Newfoundland heritage; Johnson also arranges traditional accordion numbers for the band to perform. Their recordings range from serious reflections on Newfoundland culture to light-hearted tales that border on the ridiculous (e.g. "Is You 'Appy?" and "Chainsaw Earle"). They have produced 15 albums, 2 of which are purely comedy focused, 5 compilation albums, and 5 live DVDs.

== Name ==
The group's name, and the names of many of their albums and songs, contain phonetic spellings of colloquial contractions and phrases native to Newfoundland, which would normally only be spoken aloud and in an informal setting. This reflects the group's focus on Newfoundland culture; most Newfoundlanders immediately recognize the intended meanings despite the atypical spelling. The band name plays on Newfoundlanders' habit of rapidly slurring words together; "wasisname" is a contraction of "what's his name?"; however, in Newfoundland "Buddy Wasisname" is simply a version of "I can't remember his name". "Fellers" is simply a dialectal form of "fellas" or "fellows".

== History ==
Two of the group's members (Johnson and Chaulk) were school teachers prior to forming the band. Their first album, Makin' For the Harbour was self-released in 1986. The album relied heavily on Newfoundland standards and Blackmore's comedy numbers; "Gotta Get Me Moose B'y" would become their early career signature tune, and remains one of their more popular songs. Their next album was Nods'N'Winks, which was released in 1988.

The group's third album, Flatout, was released in 1990, and contains "Saltwater Joys", the band's most requested concert song. Another song on the album, "Peein' in the Snow" also became a hit after being performed on several comedy programs. In 1992, they released The Miracle Cure, the band's best-selling album. This album contains "Chainsaw Earle"; several traditional songs and "The Pits", for which a video was produced.

In 1993, the band released 100% Pure. It includes The "Song for Newfoundland", an a cappella anthem written by Chaulk, has often been covered often by Newfoundland vocal groups. The album contains the well-known song "By The Glow Of The Kerosene Light", written by Wince Coles, which featured additional players on cello, harp and piano, an arrangement not often seen in the group's catalogue.

At the 1994 East Coast Music Awards, Buddy Wasisname and the Other Fellers won the award for Live Artist of the Year and the award for Group Recording of the Year.

The group's next album, Salt Beef Junkie, includes original songs of the same type, but the arrangements deviate from their usual style. The opening track features a full rock backing band in addition to Chaulk's guitar and Johnson's accordion; "He's A Part Of Me" features the same backing trio as "Kerosene Light"; and many of the tracks feature George Morgan's drum machines.

The group maintains an active touring schedule throughout the Atlantic provinces and other Canadian cities. In 2017, when their website was last updated, they reported playing 58 concerts.

At the East Coast Music Association's 2021 ECMA Awards, Buddy Wasisname & The Other Fellers received the Stompin' Tom Connors Award, in recognition of their long-term contribution to the East Coast music industry.

On December 29, 2022, Blackmore, Chaulk and Johnson were named Members of the Order of Canada.

== Discography ==
=== Albums ===
- Makin' for the Harbour (1986), World Records
- Nods 'n' Winks (1988), Third Wave Productions
- Flatout (1990), Third Wave Productions
- The Miracle Cure! (1992), Third Wave Productions
- 100% Pure (1993), Third Wave Productions
- Salt Beef Junkie (1995), Third Wave Productions
- Pop the Rivets (1996)*, Third Wave Productions
- Up On Bust (1996) (Comedy Album), Third Wave Productions
- D'Lard Liftin' (1998), Third Wave Productions
- The Big Tump (2000), Third Wave Productions
- Up Boot (2002), Third Wave Productions
- Whipper Snipper (2004) (Comedy Album), Third Wave Productions
- The Shed (2005), Third Wave Productions
- The Big Two Five (2009), Third Wave Productions
- Wring 'Er Out (2013), Third Wave Productions

*Stylized as "... Pop The Rivets..." on the front cover.

=== Compilations ===
- ...Greatest Misses! (1999), Third Wave Productions
- The Serious Stuff (2001), Third Wave Productions
- I'm Looney (2002), Third Wave Productions
- Take 'Er Johnson (2007), Third Wave Productions
- The Serious Stuff Volume 2 (2010), Third Wave Productions

== DVDs ==
- Up Boot (2003)
- Pop the Rivets (2007)
- The Dirty Big DVD (2008)
- LaffYerArseOff (2013)
- The Last Laff (2017)
