= Mark Critch =

Canadian comedian, actor, and writer (born 1974)

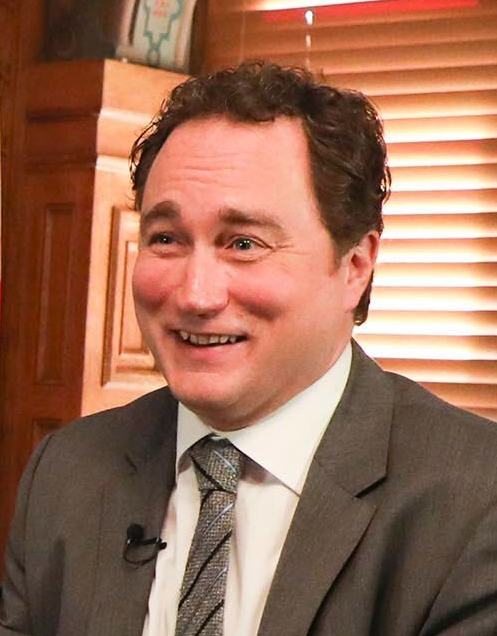
- Critch in 2017
- Born: Mark Patrick Critch; May 14, 1974 (age 52); St. John's, Newfoundland, Canada
- Occupations: Comedian; actor
- Notable credit: 22 Minutes (since 2003)
- Spouse: Melissa Royle (m. 2019)

Mark Patrick Critch (born May 14, 1974) is a Canadian comedian, actor, and writer. He is best known for his work on the comedy series This Hour Has 22 Minutes, initially as a writer and then as a regular cast member beginning in 2003. Critch is the creator of the semi-autobiographical CBC Television series Son of a Critch (2022–present).

== Family life ==
He is the son of Mike Critch, a longtime journalist for radio station VOCM in St. John's, and the younger brother of Mike Critch Jr., a radio DJ for VOCM-FM who uses the name Mike Campbell on the air. Mark Critch has two sons, Jacob and Will. Jacob Critch is a songwriter and producer, and Will Critch is a drag performer, who is appearing in the seventh season of Canada's Drag Race under the stage name Gravy.

== Career ==
Critch has been a guest on CBC Radio One's Madly Off in All Directions, the CBC Television show Republic of Doyle, and is the host of CBC TV's Halifax Comedy Festival. He performed at the Just For Laughs Festival in Montreal and the Winnipeg Comedy Festival. He played the recurring role of Gary Breakfast on the CTV sitcom Satisfaction. He appeared in several films, including Anchor Zone, Rare Birds and Above and Beyond. In 2013, Critch played Henry Tilley in The Grand Seduction, a remake of Jean-François Pouliot's French-Canadian La Grande Séduction (2003) directed by Don McKellar. Critch and fellow Newfoundland actor Allan Hawco featured in a documentary entitled Trail of the Caribou, which followed the Newfoundland Regiment's journey in the First World War. It was released in 2016 to commemorate the one-hundredth anniversary of the Regiment's tragedy at Beaumont Hamel. Critch also appeared in director Matt Johnson's 2023 film BlackBerry, portraying NHL commissioner Gary Bettman.

Critch reached national notoriety after a 22 Minutes piece aired in which Canadian Member of Parliament (MP) Carolyn Parrish stepped on a President George W. Bush doll, later causing her to be removed from caucus. He is most famous for his road pieces on the show, in which he accosts celebrities such as John Kerry, Michael Douglas, Alec Baldwin, former Canadian Prime Minister Paul Martin, Howard Dean, Avril Lavigne, Hillary Clinton and Justin Trudeau. Critch's impressions are another recurring feature on 22 Minutes, including those of Donald Trump, Rex Murphy, Don Cherry and former Newfoundland and Labrador premier Danny Williams.

== Book and adaptation ==
In 2018, Critch announced the release of his early life memoir, Son of a Critch. Published by Penguin Random House Canada, it was released on October 2, 2018, and immediately entered the Globe and Mail bestseller list, where it remained for several weeks. Son of a Critch was the winner of the Margaret and John Savage First Book Award (non-fiction) at the Atlantic Book Awards, and shortlisted for both the 2019 Stephen Leacock Memorial Medal for Humour and the 2019 Kobo Emerging Writer Prize. It was also longlisted for the 2019 RBC Taylor Prize. His second book, An Embarrassment of Critches, was also shortlisted for the Stephen Leacock Memorial Medal for Humour in 2022. His third book, Sorry, Not Sorry: An Apologetic Look at What Makes Canada Worth Fighting For, which came out on November 25, 2025, satirizes the Canadian-American relationship taking particular aim at President Donald Trump's call to turn Canada into a 51st state.

In 2021, CBC Television and Lionsgate Films announced the production of Son of a Critch, a television series adaptation of the book. Critch plays his father (Mike Critch) in the series, while child actor Benjamin Evan Ainsworth plays the young Critch.

== Recognition ==
- David Renton Award for Outstanding Performance by an Actor at the Atlantic Film Festival for his role in The Grand Seduction.
- Gemini Award
- Canadian Comedy Award
- Writers Guild of Canada Award

== Charitable work ==
Critch is known in Newfoundland and Labrador for his charitable efforts, including serving as honorary chair of the Victoria Park Foundation in St. John's, and the honorary fundraising patron of the O'Brien's Farm Foundation. He was named the Honorary Chairperson for the Cancer Society of Canada's "One Night Stand Against Cancer" campaign to raise funds for Nova Scotia's Sobey Cancer Support Centre. He has hosted and/or spearheaded fundraising campaigns for the Parkinson's Society of Newfoundland and Labrador and the Heart and Stroke Foundation.

On December 7, 2017, the Wonderful Grand Band released a re-recorded version of Babylon Mall for the 50th anniversary of the Avalon Mall, with Critch on vocals. Proceeds from the song remake were donated to the Tommy Sexton Centre.
