= WGC Screenwriting Awards =

Canadian screenwriting awards

The WGC Screenwriting Awards (previously Canadian Screenwriting Awards) are administered by the Writers Guild of Canada, and are awarded to the best script for a feature film, television or radio project produced within the Guild's jurisdiction, written by a guild member in good standing, and broadcast or released in North America or screened at a Canadian film festival for the first time in the previous year.

In addition to the film, television and radio categories, special awards presented by the WGC include the Sondra Kelly Award for projects written by women, the Denis McGrath Service Award for distinguished contributions to the organization, and the Jim Burt Screenwriting Prize for the best unproduced new screenplay. In 2025, the program also took over administration of the Margaret Collier Award, a lifetime achievement award for television writing previously presented by the Academy of Canadian Cinema and Television under the Gemini Awards and the Canadian Screen Awards.

== Awards ==
=== 2006 ===
- Children & Preschool — Mary Crawford and Alan Templeton, King: "Stolen Voices"
- Comedy & Variety — Brent Butt and Paul Mather, Corner Gas: "Dog River Vice"
- Documentary — Robert Duncan, Woodward's: The Competition
- Drama, Half-Hour — Susin Nielsen, Robson Arms: "Dancing the Horizontal Mambo"
- Drama, One Hour — Susan Coyne, Bob Martin and Mark McKinney, Slings & Arrows: "Steeped in Blood"
- Feature Film — Wil Zmak, The Dark Hours
- Radio Drama — Jason Sherman, Graf: "Episode 1"
- Youth — Jeff Biederman, Life with Derek: "The Party"
- Alex Barris Mentorship Award — Josh Miller
- Jim Burt Screenwriting Prize — Jason Hreno, Two Mountains
- Writers Block Award — Fred Yackman

=== 2007 ===
- Children & Preschool — Kate Barris, If the World Were a Village
- Comedy & Variety — Brent Butt and Kevin White, Corner Gas: "Outside Joke"
- Documentary — Barry Stevens, The Bomber's Dream
- Drama, Half-Hour — Laura Kosterski, Naked Josh: "Beating the Rap"
- Drama, One Hour — Susan Coyne, Bob Martin and Mark McKinney, Slings & Arrows: "That Way Madness Lies"
- Feature Film — Sarah Polley, Away from Her
- MOW & Miniseries — John W. Doyle and Lisa Porter, Above and Beyond
- Radio Drama — Andrew Moodie, Greg Nelson, Adam Pettle and Jason Sherman, Afghanada: "Episode 4"
- Youth — Brent Piaskoski, Naturally Sadie: "Rashomon"
- Showrunner Award — Brad Wright
- Jim Burt Screenwriting Prize — Ryan Redford, Bone
- Writers Block Award — Sondra Kelly, Sugith Varughese

=== 2008 ===
- Children & Preschool — Kenn Scott, Iggy Arbuckle: "Petition Impossible"
- Documentary — Barri Cohen, Toxic Trespass
- Drama Series, Half-Hour — Mark Farrell and Robert Sheridan, Corner Gas: "Seeing Things"
- Drama Series, One Hour — Denis McGrath and Robert Wertheimer, Across the River to Motor City: "Happy Birthday, Mr. President"
- Feature Film — Travis McDonald, Normal
- MOW or Miniseries — Ian Weir, Dragon Boys
- Radio Drama — Jason Sherman, Adam Pettle and Greg Nelson, Afghanada: "Episode 12"
- Variety — Kevin White, Mark Critch, Irwin Barker, Gavin Crawford, Gary Pearson, Jennifer Whalen, Carolyn Taylor, Albert Howell, Dave Nystrom, Geri Hall, Todd Allen and Tim McAuliffe, This Hour Has 22 Minutes: "Season XIV, Episode 17"
- Youth — Brent Piaskoski, Naturally Sadie: "In or Out of Africa"
- WGC Showrunner Award — Peter Mohan
- Jim Burt Screenwriting Prize — Tony Elliott, Stranger Than You
- Alex Barris Mentorship Award — Allan Magee
- WGC Writers Block Award — Jack Blum, Jeremy Hole and Ann MacNaughton

=== 2009 ===
- Animation — Shane Simmons, Ricky Sprocket: Showbiz Boy: "The Perfect Family"
- Children & Preschool — Christin Simms, Captain Flamingo: "Comic Slip"
- Documentary — John Walker, Passage
- Episodic, Half-Hour — Brent Butt, Corner Gas: "Full Load"
- Episodic, One Hour — Adam Barken, Flashpoint: "Who's George?"
- Feature Film — Don McKellar, Blindness
- MOW & Miniseries — Andrew Wreggitt, Mayerthorpe
- Radio Drama — Greg Spottiswood, Afghanada: "The Lotus Eater"
- Short Film — Kellie Ann Benz, Awkward
- Variety — Mark Critch, Gavin Crawford, Kyle Tingley, Jennifer Whalen, Albert Howell, Tim McAuliffe, Dean Jenkinson, Geri Hall and Nathan Fielder, This Hour Has 22 Minutes: "Season XVI, Episode 1"
- Youth — Brent Piaskoski, The Latest Buzz: "The Gala Issue"
- Showrunner Award — Mark Farrell
- Jim Burt Screenwriting Prize — Riley Adams, Cold Rush
- Writers Block Award — Karen Walton

=== 2010 ===
- Animation — Shelley Scarrow, Total Drama Action: "The Sand Witch Project"
- Children & Preschool — Kate Barris, Max & Ruby: "Max Says Goodbye"
- Documentary — Robert Lower, The Royal Winnipeg Ballet: 40 Years of One Night Stands
- Episodic, Half-Hour — Garry Campbell, Less Than Kind: "The Daters"
- Episodic, One Hour — Robert C. Cooper, Stargate Universe: "Time"
- Feature Film — Jacob Tierney, The Trotsky
- MOW & Miniseries — John Krizanc, The Summit
- Radio Drama — Barbara Samuels, Afghanada: "Episode 61"
- Short Subject — Jessie Gabe, Being Erica: "Webisodes"
- Variety — Ed Macdonald, Mark Critch, Gavin Crawford, Kyle Tingley, Albert Howell, Dean Jenkinson, Joanne O’Sullivan, Tara Doyle, Erik van Wyck, Mike Allison and Joey Case, This Hour Has 22 Minutes: "Season XVII, Episode 6"
- Youth — Anita Kapila, How to Be Indie: "How to Be a Mehta"
- Alex Barris Mentorship Award — Peter Mitchell
- Showrunner Award — Heather Conkie
- Writers Block Award — Rebecca Schechter

=== 2011 ===
- Animation — Karen Moonah, The Cat in the Hat Knows a Lot About That!: "The Cat in the Hat Knows a Lot About Maps"
- Children & Youth — Barbara Haynes, The Latest Buzz: "The Extreme Shakespeare Issue"
- Comedy — Chris Sheasgreen, Less Than Kind: "Coming Home"
- Documentary — Christine Nielsen, The Pig Farm
- Drama — Mark Ellis and Stephanie Morgenstern, Flashpoint: "Jumping at Shadows"
- Feature Film — Michael Konyves, Barney's Version
- Shorts & Webseries — Lisa Hunter, You Are So Undead
- Showrunner Award — Tassie Cameron
- Jim Burt Screenwriting Prize — Denise Blinn, 1936
- Writers Block Award — Peter Grant

=== 2012 ===
- Animation — Darrin Rose, Scaredy Squirrel: "Nothing But the Tooth"
- Children & Youth — Alice Prodanou, My Babysitter's a Vampire: "ReVamped"
- Comedy — Craig David Wallace, Todd and the Book of Pure Evil: "A Farewell to Curtis' Arm"
- Documentary — Gary Marcuse, Waking the Green Tiger: A Green Movement Rises in China
- Drama — Larry Bambrick, Flashpoint: "Shockwave"
- Movies & Miniseries — Bruce Smith, John A.: Birth of a Country
- Shorts & Webseries — Patrick Tarr, Murdoch Mysteries: The Curse of the Lost Pharaohs
- Showrunner Award — Mark McKinney
- Alex Barris Mentorship Award — Barbara Samuels
- Writers Block Award — Chuck Lazer

=== 2013 ===
- Animation — Dan Williams and Lienne Sawatsky, Sidekick: "I, Sidebot"
- Children & Youth — John May and Suzanne Bolch, How to Be Indie: "How to Make a Christmas Miracle"
- Comedy — Kim Coghill, Less Than Kind: "Jerk Chicken"
- Documentary — Mitch Miyagawa, A Sorry State
- Drama — Martin Gero, The L.A. Complex: "Down in L.A."
- Movies & Miniseries — Andrew Wreggitt, The Phantoms
- Shorts & Webseries — Julie Strassman-Cohn and Jill Golick, Ruby Skye P.I.: The Haunted Library: "#Creepy"
- Showrunner Award — Mark Ellis, Stephanie Morgenstern
- Jim Burt Screenwriting Prize — Adam Garnet Jones, Wild Medicine
- Writers Block Award — Anne-Marie Perrotta, Simon Racioppa, Lienne Sawatsky

=== 2014 ===
- Animation — Hollis Ludlow-Carroll, Almost Naked Animals: "The Rotation Situation"
- Children & Youth — Lisa Hunter, Finding Stuff Out: "Babies and Families" and Cole Bastedo, Mr. Young: "Mr. Love Letter"
- Comedy — Marvin Kaye and Chris Sheasgreen, Less Than Kind: "I'm Only Nineteen"
- Documentary — Barry Stevens, Sector Sarajevo
- Drama — Will Pascoe, Orphan Black: "Variations Under Domestication"
- Movies & Miniseries — Elan Mastai, The F Word
- Shorts & Webseries — Jill Golick and Julie Strassman, Ruby Skye P.I.: The Haunted Library: "The Final Clue"
- Alex Barris Mentorship Award — Susin Nielsen
- Showrunner Award — Peter Mitchell
- Writers Block Award — Maureen Parker

=== 2015 ===
- Animation — Simon Racioppa and Richard Elliott, Fangbone!: "The Warbrute of Friendship"
- Children & Youth — Melody Fox, The Haunting Hour: The Series: "Mrs. Worthington"
- Comedy — Andrew De Angelis, Mr. D: "Old School"
- Documentary — Michael McNamara, The Cholesterol Question
- Drama — Tony Elliott, Orphan Black: "Ipsa Scientia Potestas Est"
- Movies & Miniseries — Nicolas Billon, Elephant Song
- Shorts & Webseries — Jason Leaver, Out with Dad: "Outed"
- Showrunner Award — Bruce Smith
- Sondra Kelly Award — Alison Lea Bingeman
- Writers Block Award — Denis McGrath

=== 2016 ===
- Children — Evan Thaler Hickey, Numb Chucks: "Witless to the Prosecution"
- Comedy — Amanda Walsh, Schitt's Creek: "The Cabin"
- Documentary — Josh Freed, Deluged by Data
- Drama — Russ Cochrane, Orphan Black: "Newer Elements of Our Defense"
- Feature Film — James Kee, Sarah Larsen, Doug Taylor and Pascal Trottier, A Christmas Horror Story
- MOW & Miniseries — Clement Virgo and Lawrence Hill, The Book of Negroes
- Shorts & Webseries — Michael Konyves, Goldfish
- Tweens & Teens — Jennica Harper, Some Assembly Required: "Rocket with a Pocket"
- Showrunner Award — Frank van Keeken
- Sondra Kelly Award — Penny Gummerson
- Writers Block Award — Peter Mohan
- Alex Barris Mentorship Award — Clive Endersby

=== 2017 ===
- Best New Series Script — Alexandra Zarowny, Wynonna Earp: "Bury Me with My Guns On"
- Children's — Tim McKeon, Odd Squad: "Drop Gadget Repeat"
- Comedy — Jared Keeso and Jacob Tierney, Letterkenny: "Super Soft Birthday"
- Documentary — John Walker, Quebec My Country Mon Pays
- Drama — Mark Ellis and Stephanie Morgenstern, X Company: "August 19th"
- Feature Film — Sherry White, Maudie
- MOW & Miniseries — Adam Barken, Bruno & Boots: Go Jump in the Pool
- Tweens & Teens — Ian MacIntyre, Degrassi: Next Class: "#TeamFollowBack"
- Sondra Kelly Award — Diana Frances
- Jim Burt Screenwriting Prize — Daniel Whidden, Valhalla
- Showrunner Award — Aaron Martin
- Denis McGrath Award — Andrew Wreggitt

=== 2018 ===
- Best New Series Script — Moira Walley-Beckett, Anne with an E: "I Am No Bird, and No Net Ensnares Me"
- Children's — Sean Jara, Mysticons: "Sisters in Arms"
- Comedy — Jared Keeso and Jacob Tierney, Letterkenny: "Relationships"
- Documentary — Mark Leiren-Young, The Hundred-Year-Old Whale
- Drama — Aubrey Nealon, Cardinal: "John Cardinal"
- Feature Film — Jason Filiatrault, Entanglement
- MOW & Miniseries — Sarah Polley, Alias Grace: "Part 5"
- Shorts & Webseries — Karen McClellan, Spiral: "The Girl in the Dream"
- Tweens & Teens — Matt Kippen, The Stanley Dynamic: "The Stanley Cheer"
- Showrunner Award — Michael MacLennan
- Alex Barris Mentorship Award — Sherry White
- Sondra Kelly Award — Sarah Dodd

=== 2019 ===
- Best New Series Script — Daegan Fryklind, The Bletchley Circle: San Francisco: "Presidio"
- Children's — Josh Sager, Jerome Simpson, Wishfart: "I Wear This Hat Ironically"
- Comedy — Rupinder Gill, Schitt's Creek: "RIP Moira Rose"
- Documentary — Michael McNamara, Catwalk: Tales from the Cat Show Circuit
- Drama — Sarah Dodd, Cardinal: Blackfly Season: "Red"
- Feature Film — Jeremy Boxen, 22 Chaser
- MOW & Miniseries — Tim McKeon, Odd Squad: World Turned Odd
- Shorts & Webseries — Alex Epstein and Lisa Hunter, We’ve Come to the End of Our Time
- Tweens & Teens — Cole Bastedo, Star Falls: "The Picnic Auction"
- Sondra Kelly Award — Jinder Oujla-Chalmers
- Jim Burt Screenwriting Prize — Pat Holden, Mirsada and Amir Kahnamouee, Harbour House
- Showrunner Award — Emily Andras
- McGrath Service Award — Bruce Smith

=== 2020 ===
- Children — Mark Steinberg, Hotel Transylvania: The Series: "Better Know Your Mavis"
- Comedy — Jann Arden and Jennica Harper, Jann: "The Big House"
- Documentary — Nance Ackerman, Ariella Pahlke and Teresa MacInnes, Conviction
- Drama Series — Noelle Carbone, Coroner: "All's Well"
- Feature Film — Laura Phillips, Sweetness in the Belly
- MOW & Miniseries — David Elver and Andrea Stevens, Thicker Than Water
- Preschool — J. J. Johnson, Christin Simms and Amish Patel, Dino Dana: "Dino Prints"
- Shorts & Webseries — Fab Filippo, Save Me: "Birdie's End"
- Tweens & Teens — Emma Campbell, Creeped Out: "The Takedown"
- Sondra Kelly Award — Cynthia Knight
- Alex Barris Mentorship Award — Nathalie Younglai
- Showrunner Award — Dennis Heaton

=== 2021 ===
- Children — Mark De Angelis, Odd Squad Mobile Unit: "Slow Your Roll"
- Comedy — Daniel Levy, Schitt's Creek: "Happy Ending"
- Documentary — Jonny Harris, Fraser Young, Graham Chittenden and Steve Dylan, Still Standing: "Rankin Inlet"
- Drama — Michelle Latimer, Tony Elliott and Penny Gummerson, Trickster: "Episode 105"
- Feature Film — Tracey Deer and Meredith Vuchnich, Beans
- MOW & Miniseries — Becky Southwell and Dylan Neal, Gourmet Detective: Roux the Day
- Preschool — J. J. Johnson, Dino Dana: "The Sound of Dinosaurs"
- Shorts & Webseries — Simone Swan and The Affolter Brothers, Try to Fly
- Tweens & Teens — Joseph Mallozzi and R. T. Thorne, Utopia Falls: "The World Is Yours"
- Sondra Kelly Award — Kate Hewlett
- Jim Burt Screenwriting Prize — Travis McDonald, Magnificent
- Showrunner Award — Morwyn Brebner

=== 2022 ===
- Children's — Lakna Edilima, Odd Squad Mobile Unit: "H2 Oh No"
- Comedy — Bilal Baig and Fab Filippo, Sort Of: "Sort of Gone"
- Drama — Tassie Cameron and Sherry White, Pretty Hard Cases: "Bananas"
- Feature Film — Michael McGowan, All My Puny Sorrows
- MOW & Miniseries — James Phillips, As Gouda As It Gets
- Preschool — Michael Foulke, Elinor Wonders Why: "Olive's Tree"
- Shorts & Webseries — Maddi Patton, My Pride: The Series: "Fire"
- Tweens & Teens — Amanda Joy, The Parker Andersons/Amelia Parker: "Joy"
- Sondra Kelly Award — Carolyn Saunders
- Alex Barris Mentorship Award — Matt Huether
- Denis McGrath Award — Michael Amo
- Showrunner Award — Anthony Q. Farrell

=== 2023 ===
- Children's — Christine Mitchell, The Guava Juice Show: "Adventure 9000"
- Comedy — Kurt Smeaton, Children Ruin Everything: "Road Trip"
- Documentary — Jason Sherman, My Tree
- Drama — Marsha Greene, The Porter: "Episode 104"
- Feature Film — Clement Virgo, Brother
- MOW & Miniseries — David Elver, Written in the Stars
- Preschool — Ben Joseph and Mike D'Ascenzo, Dino Ranch: "Wings Over Dino Ranch"
- Shorts & Webseries — Darrin Rose, Second Life
- Tweens & Teens — Veronika Paz, Astrid and Lilly Save the World: "One Rib"
- Sondra Kelly Award — Laura Good
- Jim Burt Award — Adrian Morphy, The 300 Year Old Man
- Showrunner Award — Susin Nielsen

=== 2024 ===
- Children's — Lienne Sawatsky, Pinecone & Pony: "Hero Soup"
- Comedy — Enuka Okuma, Workin' Moms: "It’s Five O’Clock Somewhere"
- Drama — Zoe Leigh Hopkins, Little Bird: "Bineshi Kwe"
- Feature Film — Dan Gordon, Irena's Vow; Jonas Chernick and Diana Frances, The Burning Season
- MOW & Miniseries — Marie Clements, Bones of Crows: "To Be Here"
- Preschool — Suzanne Bolch and John May, Superbuns: "The Sweet Sound of Christmas"
- Shorts & Webseries — Ravi Steve Khajuria, I Will Bury You: "Depression"
- Tweens & Teens — Jeff Detsky, Popularity Papers: "Pain in the Bat Mitzvah"
- Sondra Kelly Award — Meredith Vuchnich
- Alex Barris Award — Ben Joseph
- Denis McGrath Award — Alex Levine
- Showrunner Award — Mark Haroun

=== 2025 ===
- Children's — Mike Girard, Open Season: Call of Nature: "Cash Camp Pt. 1 & 2"
- Comedy — Jagjiwan Sohal, Late Bloomer: "The Turban"
- Drama — Michael Konyves, Wild Cards: "The Infinity Thief"
- Documentary — Heath Affolter, Nathan Affolter, Thomas Affolter and Jon Affolter, Altona
- Feature Film — Jason Buxton, Sharp Corner
- MOW & Miniseries — Keri Ferencz, Gilded Newport Mysteries: Murder at the Breakers
- Preschool — Shelley Hoffman and Robert Pincombe, Luna, Chip & Inkie Adventure Rangers Go: “Lights, Camera, Save Eagle Creek!”
- Short Films — Joel Buxton, Let Me In
- Webseries — Brendan Halloran, Space Janitors: "Clones War"
- Tweens & Teens — Evany Rosen, Davey & Jonesie's Locker: "Orange Is the New Snack"
- Sondra Kelly Award — Leah Johnston
- Jim Burt Award — Faisal Lutchmedial
- Showrunner Award — Matt Schiller
- Margaret Collier Award — Andrew Wreggitt

=== 2026 ===
- Children's — Emer Common, Lana Longbeard: "Lana the Something Super Great and Totally Awesome"
- Comedy — Garry Campbell, North of North: "Dumpcano"
- Drama — Corey Liu, Family Law: "Play It Straight"
- Documentary — Brishkay Ahmed, In the Room
- Feature Film — Madeleine Sims-Fewer and Dusty Mancinelli, Honey Bunch
- Preschool — Katherine Sandford, Mittens & Pants: "Pants in the Box"
- Short Films — Jason Filiatrault, Now, I Am a Bear
- Webseries — Kaveh Mohebbi, 18 to 35: "Buck Mustang"
- Tweens & Teens — Laura Good, Bet: "The Hunt"
- McGrath Service Award — Jeremy Boxen
- Alex Barris Mentorship Award — Lawrence S. Mirkin
- Showrunner Award — Simon Barry
- Margaret Collier Award — Ian Weir

== See also ==
- Canadian television awards
