= Bill Carr (actor) =

Canadian stage and screen actor

- Born: William James Carr; 1955 (age 70–71); Canada
- Occupations: Actor, comedian
- Years active: 1977–present
- Children: Jack, Alex and Ruby

Bill Carr is a Canadian stage and screen actor. He is remembered for his role as Possum Lodge cook and wannabe actor and singer Eddie Johnson on the second season of The Red Green Show. as well as numerous live performances. Carr is also known for his work with the CBC's The Journal and Midday and received two Atlantic Journalism Awards for his satirical commentaries.

== Early life ==
Carr was born in Nova Scotia and raised on Prince Edward Island, graduating from Colonel Gray High School. He went on to Acadia University where he studied English and Theatre. While at Acadia, he met Evelyn Garbary, who offered him a role as the lead in Hamlet.

In addition to his studies in theatre, Carr studied Philosophy and English followed years later by work towards his Masters of Theology at Christian Theological Seminary in Indianapolis, Indiana, and the Atlantic School of Theology in Halifax.

== Career ==
Carr's thirty-five-year career has seen him perform on stages across Canada, most notably in Nova Scotia at Neptune Theatre, Mermaid Theatre and the Atlantic Theatre Festival. He has written and performed in radio dramas for CBC and has made appearances in television programs, movies and advertisements. In the 1980s, Carr performed regularly in the comedy review "Ole Charlie Farquharson's Testament and Magic Lantern Show" created by Donald Harron and Frank Peppiatt.

Carr was invited to join the Atlantic Theatre Festival by founding director Michael Bawtree. There, he performed the dual role of "Poche" and "Victor Chandebisse" in the festival's premiere performance, A Flea in Her Ear. Carr has also appeared at the festival as the title character in Moliere's Tartuffe, Sir Toby Belch in Twelfth Night, and Lopakhin in Anton Chekov's The Cherry Orchard.

At the Neptune Theatre, Carr performed in The Government Inspector, Rave Reviews, and The Love List. Also at the Neptune, Carr co-wrote and performed in Cindy: A Feminist Musical, a takeoff on the Cinderella story, wherein he portrayed one of the ugliest stepsisters of all time. In a review of Love List, Carr was noted for "getting so many laughs he slowed down the action."

Carr also was ensemble performer and head writer of the CBC radio series "Common Broadcasting Company" and a regular weekly columnist with the Sunday edition of the Daily News and the Chronicle-Herald. He also hosted a talk show on Rogers FM called Saturday Mornings with Bill Carr.

Carr is an active volunteer in his community. He is the honorary spokesperson for the Alzheimer's Society of Nova Scotia and an honorary Trustee of the IWK Health Centre. He appears annually on the IWK telethon and serves as Master of Ceremonies for events in support of a number of charitable and arts organizations such as Unicef, Neptune Theatre (Halifax), Mermaid Theatre of Nova Scotia, Symphony Nova Scotia, the Canadian Breast Cancer Society, the Abilities Foundation, Reaching out for Adolescent Mental Health and Phoenix House, the Salvation Army, the CNIB.

Carr currently travels throughout North America speaking and giving workshops and keynote addresses on creativity, communication and living deeply with humour. Recently, he has directed a short film documentary titled A Way Through on the experiences of victims of crime and restorative justice. Carr is a founding partner of the Atlantic Restorative Company, a social entrepreneurship deliberately focused on applying restorative practices to strengthen relationships in business, justice, schools, personal life and all aspects of community.

== Filmography ==
- Norman's Awesome Experience (1989)
- Recipe for Revenge (1998)
- Blessed Stranger: After Flight 111 (2000)
- A Town Without Christmas (2001)
- Trudeau (2002)
- The Christmas Shoes (2002)
- Finding John Christmas (2003)
- The Hunt for the BTK Killer (2005)
- A Bug and a Bag of Weed (2006)
- Sticks and Stones (2008)
- Growing Op (2008)
- Haven – "The Hand You're Dealt" (2010)
- Blackbird (2012)
- A Way Through (2012)
- Moving Day (2012)
