= Graham Chittenden =

Canadian standup comedian

Graham Chittenden is a Canadian standup comedian and television writer from Brantford, Ontario, most noted for his work as part of the writing team for the television series Still Standing.

Alongside Jonny Harris, Steve Dylan and Fraser Young, he is a four-time winner of the Canadian Screen Award for Best Writing in a Factual Program or Series for their work on the show, winning at the 6th Canadian Screen Awards in 2018 for "Fort McMurray", at the 7th Canadian Screen Awards in 2019 for "Carcross", at the 8th Canadian Screen Awards in 2020 for "Churchill", and at the 9th Canadian Screen Awards in 2021 for "Rankin Inlet"; in 2021, they also won a WGC Screenwriting Award for "Rankin Inlet". In addition to his writing for Still Standing, he also frequently performs as a warm-up comedian prior to Harris's headline set.

Chittenden launched his comedy career in the 2000s. In 2011, he headlined his own Comedy Now! special for The Comedy Network, for which he was a Canadian Comedy Award nominee for Best Taped Live Performance at the 13th Canadian Comedy Awards in 2012.

In 2013, he was one of the hosts of the shortlived MTV Showtown for MTV Canada. In 2015 he created the web series Stand Up Guy, which mixed real stand-up performance with a fictionalized account of his life as a working comedian.

In 2017 he was a finalist in SiriusXM Canada's annual Canada's Top Comic competition, and in 2018 he released the comedy special Graham Chittenden: Reluctant Adult on Crave. He has also appeared on CBC Radio's The Debaters, and has written for the television sitcom Mr. D.

In 2022, he auditioned as a contestant in the second season of Canada's Got Talent, but did not advance to the semi-finals.
