= Steve Dylan =

Canadian comedian and television writer

Steve Dylan is the stage name of Steve Patterson, a Canadian comedian and television writer from Kingston, Ontario, most noted as a writer for Still Standing.

He studied engineering and urban planning at Queen's University, but decided during his studies that he wanted to be an actor instead. He had several television acting roles under his own name, most notably a recurring role as Phillip the Sound Guy in The Jon Dore Television Show, for which he was also a writer. He, Jon Dore and Mark Forward won the Canadian Comedy Award for Best Writing in a Series at the 9th Canadian Comedy Awards in 2008 for their work on the show.

When he branched out into stand-up comedy, he began using the stage name Steve Dylan, in part to avoid confusion with the already-established comedian Steve Patterson.

As a writer for Still Standing, he won the award for Best Writing in a Factual Program or Series alongside Jonny Harris and Fraser Young at the 5th Canadian Screen Awards in 2017 for the "Vanastra" episode. With Graham Chittenden added to the writing team in subsequent seasons, the quartet has won the same award four more times to date, at the 6th Canadian Screen Awards in 2018 for "Fort McMurray", at the 7th Canadian Screen Awards in 2019 for "Carcross", at the 8th Canadian Screen Awards in 2020 for "Churchill", and at the 9th Canadian Screen Awards in 2021 for "Rankin Inlet"; in 2021, they also won a WGC Screenwriting Award for "Rankin Inlet".
