= Moving Day (2012 film) =

- Theatrical release poster
- Directed by: Mike Clattenburg
- Written by: Mike Clattenburg; Mike O'Neill
- Produced by: Mike Clattenburg
- Starring: Gabriel Hogan; Bill Carr; Gerry Dee; Victor Garber; Jonny Harris; Charlie Murphy; Cathy Jones; Shauna MacDonald; Gabrielle Miller; Will Sasso
- Cinematography: Jeremy Benning
- Edited by: Dean Soltys
- Release date: 2012
- Running time: 95 minutes
- Country: Canada
- Language: English

Moving Day is a 2012 Canadian comedy film directed by Mike Clattenburg and written by Clattenburg and Mike O'Neill. The film centres on four men working for a moving company in Dartmouth, Nova Scotia whose personal lives are as messy as their professional ones.

The film's cast includes Gabriel Hogan, Bill Carr, Gerry Dee, Victor Garber, Jonny Harris, Charlie Murphy, Cathy Jones, Shauna MacDonald, Gabrielle Miller, Will Sasso, Don Bottomley, David Rossetti and Jordan Poole.

== Plot ==
Clyde (Sasso), a mover, is unhappy with his job at Redmond's Furniture, and is dreaming of a career change.

Clyde, Cedric (Murphy), and AJ (Hogan) are movers who work for Redmond's Furniture and Moving, a moving company. Near the beginning of the film, while trying to move boxes out of a customer's house, they drop several of them over the railing of a staircase. To makeup for the damages, they settle on a $7500 cash reimbursement with the distressed customers.

Soon after, Clyde has a nightmare whereby he lifts the seat of a chair off of its legs and sees dozens of mice. In the nightmare, he also gets a job offer to work at Redmond's for the rest of his life; however, he implies that he would rather be a street construction worker for the rest of his life.

In the next scene, Clyde starts crying because he believes he is going to be fired. In the meantime, AJ has an affair with one of the customers they had moved, who is an older woman.

Clyde has a meeting with Wilf (Garber), his manager, in which Wilf puts Clyde on probation for the incident that had taken place at their customer's house. Clyde then gets upset, and Wilf subsequently offers him a Turtle. Wilf also asks Clyde if AJ has been drinking on the job, to which Clyde nervously responds by saying: "No." Wilf thinks Clyde is trying to protect AJ, and tells Clyde to take another Turtle if AJ has been drinking while working. Clyde takes another Turtle.

The Redmond's workers then go to another customer's building, and Denis, another mover at Redmond's, begins hitting on the female receptionists. In an attempt to be humorous and impress the ladies, Dennis puts a sign on Clydes back, saying: "Call me donks." After the ladies inform Clyde of the sign on his back, he gets upset with Dennis and pins him to a wall, insisting that Dennis deletes the video he had taken of the situation. Cedric then informs Dennis that Clyde is on probation, encouraging him to refrain from attempting to get Clyde fired. Denis and Clyde makeup.

AJ is called into a meeting with Wilf, whereby he is put on probation for drinking while working. In the meantime, Clyde takes apart old cardboard boxes and writes several encouraging quotes on them, as well as quotes from people he works with. He puts these quotes up on the walls around his home. The next day, Clyde slept in for work; therefore, Cedric, AJ and Dennis show up at his house. Dennis sees the pieces of cardboard boxes all over Clyde's walls and takes pictures of the quotes which say: "'I need you' - Wilf," and "Dennis is mean to people because he's hurt inside. He thinks he should be famous but he is not. He's unhappy. Poor Dennis." While at Clyde's, AJ drinks again, despite insisting that he has stopped drinking. Wilf calls him, and AJ lies in two ways: He says he is not drinking, and says that they are at a customer's home, not Clyde's.

Wilf goes out for dinner with Linda and tells her that Redmond's could not afford insurance even though they continued to collect insurance premiums from their customers. They kept doing it because no one had yet noticed.

Cedric tells Clyde he only works at Redmond's because he feels like it is his only option, explaining that he cannot get another job because of the 6 years he spent in the penitentiary for knocking a man out while drunk. Linda goes to see Cedric, Dennis and Clyde at the office and encourages them to attend Wilf's birthday party that night. Wilf then gets Linda an expensive pen and promotes her to a managerial position.

Cedric wife's grandma passes away, and so he quits his job at Redmond's because he and his wife have inherited property in South Carolina. Wilf was not pleased that Cedric gave him such a short notice, but Cedric points out that he is not on contract since he is being paid under the table, and so he should not be upset.

AJ gets angry with Dennis for ratting him out for drinking, despite that it was actually Clyde who told Wilf. While driving, AJ and Clyde get into an argument, and then crash the Redmond's truck into another vehicle. The company called the police and said the truck was stolen by AJ, so that they would not have to pay for damage.

Later on, Clyde easily confesses that it was him, not Dennis, who ratted AJ out for drinking. He did not know that AJ had already gotten angry at Dennis.

Near the end of the film, the Redmond's workers went out to see a band perform, and planned to go for drinks afterwards. Clyde was upset, because since Dennis wanted to bring ladies with them to the bar after, there was not enough room for him to also join. He felt excluded, and ended up going back to Redmond's office. There, he had a hallucination, where Wilf's dog, Little Buddy, levitates and flies away, and Wilf floats into the room looking for him. Wilf begins to weep because Little Buddy is gone, and Cedric shows up, telling Clyde not to trust Wilf.

At the end of the film, Clyde says goodbye to Cedric as he leaves for his new home in South Carolina.

== Reception ==
=== Awards and nominations ===
Award	Category	Recipient	Result
1st Canadian Screen Awards	Best Supporting Actress	Gabrielle Miller	Nominated
DGC Craft Awards 2013	Best Direction - Feature Film	Mike Clattenburg	Nominated

=== Critical response ===
Moving Day has garnered criticism from the Canadian film critic community. Chris Knight of the National Post rated Moving Day 1.5 stars. He wrote: "Nothing ever gets too crazy in Moving Day, which seems so intent on showing how dull the life of a mover can be that it actually tips over into dullness itself." Pat Mullen, from Cinemablographer.com, rated the film 2 out of 5 stars, calling it "embarrassingly unfunny" and "a missed opportunity to create a decent comedy for mainstream Canadian audiences." Exclaim!'s Kevin Scott wrote: "The supporting roles are all well cast and considered but, because of this, the story has a tendency to meander and lose some momentum." He also pointed to the positive and claimed, "As a native of Nova Scotia, the film is sure to have special meaning for Clattenburg and he's managed to create a comedy with heart that approaches the holy grail of Apatow."
