= Fraser Young =

Canadian comedian

Comedy career
- Medium: Stand-up
- Genres: Anecdotal comedy, observational comedy

Fraser Young is a stand-up comedian who lives in Toronto, Ontario but headlines right across Canada, and as far away as Hong Kong.

Young has won the prestigious Tim Sims Encouragement Fund, awarded to the best up and coming comic in Toronto that shows a creative and fresh approach to comedy. Young has also made several national television and radio appearances, including CBC Radio's Brave New Waves, Madly Off in All Directions, and Definitely Not The Opera. In addition, he starred in his very own episode of Comedy Now!, broadcast on CTV and The Comedy Network. Other TV Standup Appearances include Just For Laughs, the Winnipeg Comedy Festival and the Halifax Comedy Festival.

Young also appeared numerous times on MuchMoreMusic and was a regular on MuchMusic's Video On Trial. as well as appearing on both seasons of the Canadian version of Match Game.

His writing credits include The NHL Awards, the Genie Awards, preteen sitcom The Latest Buzz, Almost Heroes on Showcase, CTV's Spun Out, Gaming Show (In My Parents Garage) on Disney XD and George Stroumboulopoulos Tonight and Still Standing on CBC.

Young has two comedy CDs: Everyone Loves A Smug Bastard and Food, Medicine, and A Surprising Amount of Math, which debuted as the #1 comedy album on the Canadian iTunes charts.

Alongside Jonny Harris and Steve Dylan, Young was a winner of the Canadian Screen Award for Best Writing in a Factual Program or Series at the 5th Canadian Screen Awards in 2017 for the "Vanastra" episode of Still Standing. With Graham Chittenden added to the writing team in subsequent seasons, the quartet has won the same award four more times to date, at the 6th Canadian Screen Awards in 2018 for "Fort McMurray", at the 7th Canadian Screen Awards in 2019 for "Carcross", at the 8th Canadian Screen Awards in 2020 for "Churchill", and at the 9th Canadian Screen Awards in 2021 for "Rankin Inlet"; in 2021, they also won a WGC Screenwriting Award for "Rankin Inlet".
