= Gerry Dee =

Canadian actor and stand-up comedian (born 1968)

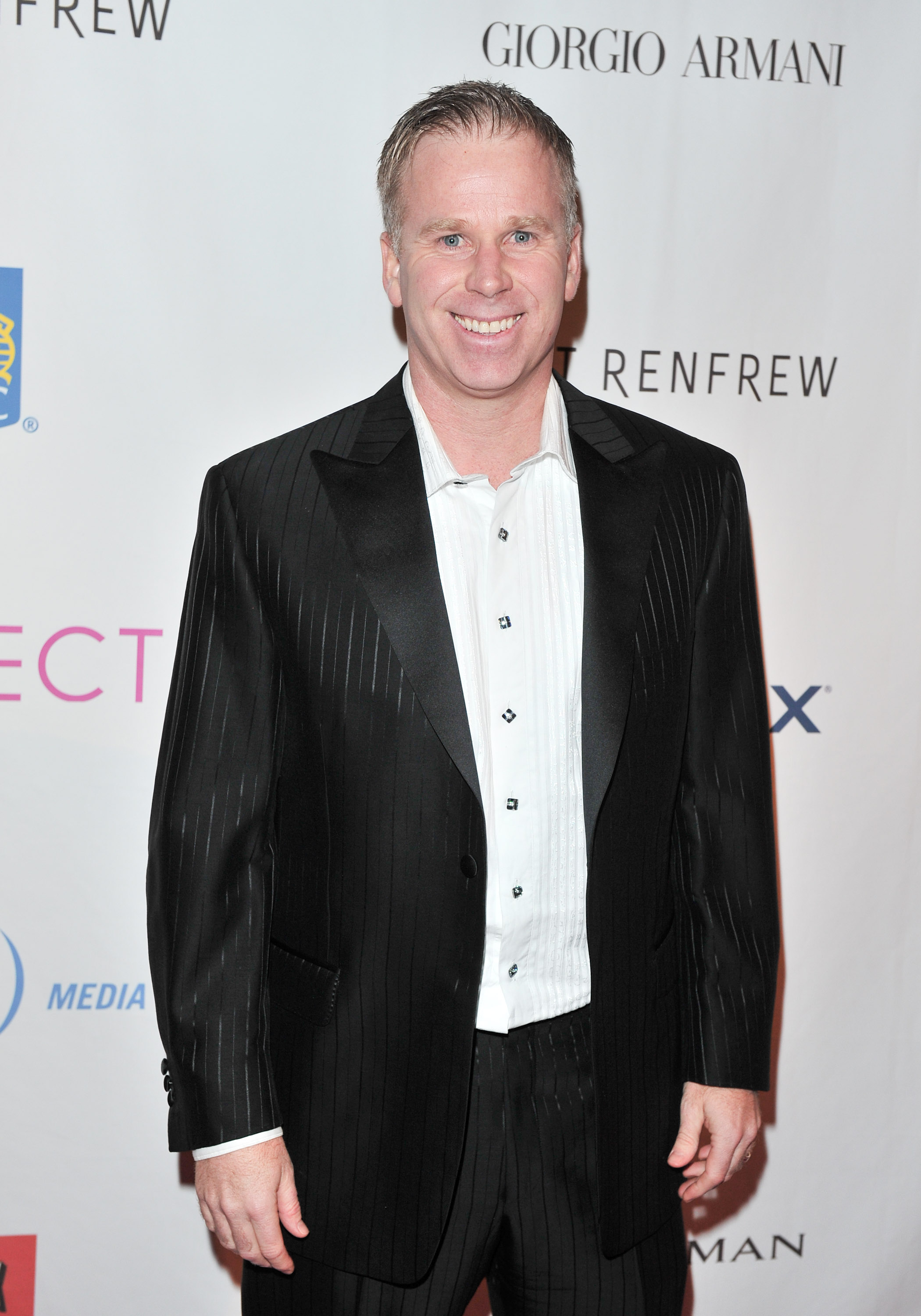
- Dee in February 2012
- Born: Gerard Francis-John Donoghue; December 31, 1968 (age 57); Scarborough, Ontario, Canada
- Occupations: Actor; stand-up comedian; game show host; director; producer; writer
- Years active: 2001–present
- Spouse: Heather Dee
- Children: 3
- Website: www.gerrydee.com

Gerry Dee (born Gerard Francis-John Donoghue; December 31, 1968) is a Canadian actor, stand-up comedian, game show host, director, producer, and writer. He is also the host of Family Feud Canada. He placed third on the fifth season of Last Comic Standing, and he wrote and starred in the sitcom Mr. D, which aired on CBC Television.

== Early life ==
Dee was born Gerard Francis-John Donoghue, and is of Irish and Scottish descent. He was born in Scarborough and raised in Toronto. He was a university varsity hockey player, he later worked as a physical education teacher and hockey coach. He studied kinesiology and athletic therapy at York University and education at St. Francis Xavier University. His father was a bus driver for the TTC in Toronto for over 20 years.He was also a police officer as discussed by Dee in his 2025 Netflix comedy special.

== Career ==
Dee was relatively successful long before being on Last Comic Standing. He had already had his own comedy special on The Comedy Network in Canada, appeared on the Comedy Network special "The Nubian Disciples", and performed at the world-famous Montreal Just for Laughs International Comedy Festival, having his segment aired on Just For Laughs. He has appeared in television commercials and has performed at many comedy clubs, including Just For Laughs and Yuk Yuks. Dee also had a role in the 2006 film Trailer Park Boys: The Movie, where he played the role of Donny. That same year, Dee played former Boston Bruins player Wayne Cashman in the CBC miniseries Canada Russia '72.

Dee placed third on the fifth season of Last Comic Standing. He had tried out for Last Comic Standing during the second and fourth seasons, but never advanced to the finals. He missed the birth of his daughter while appearing on the show. Starting in late 2007, Dee had his own segment on Canadian cable channel The Score (later known as Sportsnet). These segments, entitled Gerry Dee: Sports Reporter, saw Dee conducting humorous interviews and segments. The interviews included such sports personalities as Charles Barkley, Michael Jordan, Wayne Gretzky, Cito Gaston, Randy Couture, and Chris Bosh.

Dee appeared in television commercials for Rogers, Wisers, KFC, and Nissan. He is currently making guest appearances on CBC's The Hour. He won a 2008 Canadian Comedy Award in the Best Male Stand-Up comic category.

In January 2012, his sitcom Mr. D premiered on CBC Television. Created, written by and starring Dee, the show is based on his experience as a high-school teacher.

On July 8, 2019, it was announced Dee would be the host of Family Feud Canada.

Dee appears in the sitcom Animal Control, which began in 2023 and was renewed into 2024.

He appears in the sitcom DMV on CBS.

In July 2025, Dee shot his first Netflix stand-up special called "Funny You Should Say That". The series premiered on Netflix on November 18, 2025.

== Publishing career ==
In October 2012, Doubleday Canada published Dee's Teaching: It's Harder Than It Looks. Like Dee's sitcom Mr. D, Teaching is based on his ten years as a teacher. A national bestseller, the book came out in paperback in May 2013.

== Personal life ==
Dee is the son of Scottish immigrant parents. He is a former high school physical education teacher. He was the first Canadian to win the San Francisco Comedy Competition. He played varsity hockey at St Francis Xavier University in Antigonish, Nova Scotia. Dee and his wife, Heather, have two daughters and one son.

== Filmography ==
=== Film ===
| Year | Title | Role | Notes |
|---|---|---|---|
| 2006 | Trailer Park Boys: The Movie | Donny | |
| 2011 | 388 Arletta Avenue | Boss | |
| 2012 | Moving Day | Jim | |
| 2017 | Prom Night | Paul | Short; Also executive producer |
| 2027 | Heated Rivalry | Coach Cooper | Season 2 |

=== Television ===
| Year | Title | Role | Notes |
|---|---|---|---|
| 2001 | Comedy Now! | Himself | 1 episode Also writer |
| 2006 | Canada Russia '72 | Wayne Cashman | 2 episodes |
| 2008–2019 | CBC Winnipeg Comedy Festival | Himself/host | 3 episodes |
| 2011 | Skins | Dr. Westly | Episode: "Michele" |
| 2012–2018 | Mr. D | Gerry Duncan | 73 episodes Also director, executive producer and writer |
| 2014 | Gerry Dee: The Substitute | Himself | Television film Also director, producer and writer |
| 2019–present | Family Feud Canada | Himself/host | |
| 2019–2021 | The Moodys | Roger | 10 episodes |
| 2023–present | Animal Control | Templeton Dudge | Recurring, 21 episodes |
| 2023 | Pretty Hard Cases | Dack Adams | 3 episodes |
| 2025 | DMV | Dan | 2 episodes |
| 2025 | Funny You Should Say That | Himself | Netflix stand-up special |
