= Patience (play) =

1998 play by Jason Sherman

Patience is a play written and published in 1998 by Jason Sherman. It is about Reuben, who loses everything one day. The play follows a path similar to David Mamet's play Edmond. It traces a psychological journey through Reuben's head while he tries to figure out how everything happened.

Jason Sherman wrote Patience mainly in a realist style. These scenes happen in real-time; although he jumps from scene to scene, each individual scene takes as long as it would in real time. The characters do not go to unrealistic places; they remain in the actual real world, except for Reuben's encounter with Paul. This play stays on one storyline, Reuben is the main character and the play follows his path. The audience views the play from afar and are not involved in the story. It also follows a real issue of storyline, the time.

This play was written in 1998 and is about a successful businessman who loses everything. The play does not give the audience a fairytale ending. It ends with Reuben finally coming to grips with the fact that he is at fault for all the bad events in his life. Although most realist plays run in chronological order, other realist plays do not and are still considered realism because their scenes seem to fit together correctly in the order presented. This is true for Patience as there are flashbacks, but at very strategic points that give the audience insight into why things have just happened as they did.

In Patience there are elements of absurdism. Reuben, within his mentality, is living in a world full of absurdism. He is at the mercy of a higher power, whatever that might be. By the end of the play, he comes to terms that his life cannot be changed. A quote from A Student's Guide to Play Analysis demonstrates how much the theatre of absurd is involved: "The purpose of writing, therefore, is simply to express their despair and perhaps to share it with others; to find in a sense, comfort in knowing that they are not alone in realizing that they are in fact, completely alone". This is almost the exact realization that Reuben finds at the end.

Patience can also be seen as a postmodern play. Sherman gives the audience many monologues where characters explain their ideas on whether individuals control their destiny, or that their actions have no barring on outcomes. The audience is faced with the question of whether all events connect or just happen randomly. The play focuses on the dialogue of the play and less on the story. The message of the play can be seen in those monologues. The play's structure does not go through chronological order; it focuses on how closely the scenes are tied together.

== Synopsis ==
=== Act 1 ===
While playing squash with Peter, Reuben gets into an argument which causes Reuben to go to dinner by himself. At dinner, Paul comes into the restaurant and asks Reuben if he has everything he needs, which confuses Reuben. At home, Reuben's wife Donna confronts him about love letters between him and another girl. He explains that they were from a long time ago, but she kicks him out of the house.

At a bar, Reuben runs into Mike, who tells him about how he was just laid off. Reuben mentions his conversation with Paul to his friend at the bar, who informs him that Paul had died in a plane crash a year ago heading to Vancouver. Shaken up by what Mike has told him, Reuben leaves the bar and goes to a pay phone to find Paul's home phone number. Paul's wife Sarah answers, and she confirms Paul's death. The conversation ends there because Sarah is busy watching a movie with her kids.

After hanging up with Sarah, Reuben receives a call from Peter, who tells him to come to the office. When Reuben arrives, he is confronted by Peter and two other colleagues, Frank and Janice, and is informed that he is fired. They blame him for their loss of the Korean deal and that they knew he had stolen money from the company.

Reuben calls Sarah again and insists on seeing her, and she agrees to meet in a half hour. After the conversation, there is a flashback to the party at Sarah and Paul's house, during which it is revealed that Sarah was the girl Reuben had been writing the love letters to. Paul walks in the room and sees Reuben and Sarah kissing, and he does nothing. Reuben knows that this was completely out of character, and he is never able to get the image out of his head.

Returning to the present, Reuben is at Sarah's house. They talk about how Paul had begged Sarah to stay, which she did, and then nine years later, he told her that he was not happy anymore, and that he was leaving for Vancouver to make movies. Sarah does most of the talking, and Reuben leaves after having no answer for her about whether Paul thought of her or his new lover in Vancouver. In his car, Reuben receives a phone call from Phil, who tells Reuben that Johnny, the third brother, was about to die, and that he should come to Florida immediately. Reuben agrees and takes the next flight to Florida.

After picking up Reuben from the airport, Phil reveals that he is leaving his wife Mary for a student he was teaching. He thought this was always bound to happen: "Every year, I worry about this. Every year they get more gorgeous. Or maybe I get less picky." He tells Reuben everything, about how they met, how they first went out for a drink, and how he fell in love with her right away. He asks Reuben if something like this had ever happened to him before. He mentions once, but nothing ever came of it, and before he has a chance to tell Phil of the details, Phil receives a call from his mother informing him that Johnny has died.

=== Act two ===
==== Scene One ====
Act two starts with Phil and his new girlfriend, Liz, at her place three months later. Reuben is still not at ease about the events of that day three months ago. Reuben wants so desperately to know what caused this train wreck of events. Reuben believes there should be a starting point where everything was set into motion, an exact moment. He can't seem to find the moment and it haunts him. Phil tries to comfort him but Reuben isn't easily coaxed. Liz then enters the room and meets Reuben for the first time but leaves shortly to go skating. After Liz leaves, Reuben continues to talk about his philosophy of events and of life. "If I do this then I will get that" (Sherman 59). This is when Phil corrects Reuben and starts to explain chaos theory to him, even though Reuben does not want to hear it. Before Phil gets far, Liz re-enters, not being able to find her skate guards, and leaves quickly. Phil continues and tries to tell Reuben that he should not try to find the connections between events and that attempting to pinpoint the starting point would only drive him insane. Reuben does not want to hear his theory and leaves.

==== Scene Two ====
Reuben is wandering around the city when he runs into a Rabbi who convinces him to come and perform a minyan. A minyan refers to a quorum required for certain obligations; it is usually done in public with ten men. On their way to the shul they find out that they knew each other when they were younger. He asks how his brothers were doing and Reuben informs him that Johnny had died. The Rabbi then seems to look into Reuben's soul. He sees the pain in Reuben and he asks the same questions Reuben has been repeating in his head, adding a few more for some perspective.

Although the rabbi feels the reason for Reuben's pain is his brother's passing, he assists in helping Reuben find the answer. The rabbi tells Reuben why he did not recognize him as a Jew and tells a little bit of history about Jews as they arrive at the shul. When they arrive the rabbi takes him upstairs and leads him right to Sarah.

==== Scene Three ====
Reuben goes to Phil and Liz's place to tell Phil of his encounter but only finds Liz. Phil is out on a run, so they make small talk for a while. They bounce through subjects about his drink, her skate guards, piano, when they finally move onto the subject of physics where Liz tries to explain chaos theory in a different way by telling him a story about a butterfly. "A butterfly leaves a tree somewhere, and it stirs the air, which affects the wind, which causes turbulence, which brings down a passenger jet" (Sherman 73). Reuben likes this analogy and superimposes his story right on top. He does not fully understand because he still feels like he controls his own destiny and that his actions mean something, but Liz explains that the decisions he make have an effect; he just cannot predict what that effect will be. They come to a stalling point in their conversation about what happened to Reuben, so Reuben asks her to play the piano for him and she does.

==== Scene Four ====
Sarah and Reuben are at a restaurant when Reuben tells Sarah about his encounter with Paul before they talked on that fateful day. They find out that this encounter was stranger than it seemed as everything he told Reuben about his life was in fact true. They come to the same question that Paul left both of them: "Do you need everything you have?" There are three other characters in this scene: a man, a woman and a man on the phone. They seem to almost be reacting to the events of Reuben's life. The man and woman are fighting about the man cheating on her and the man on the cell phone is talking about taking money from his company that he built from the ground up. Reuben still wants to know how this whole thing started and Sarah attempts to explain that things do just happen for no rhyme or reason. Sarah goes with him on this journey to find out where everything started going wrong, and during the process confesses that she would have run away with him if he had called. Reuben felt the same but both were too afraid to make the first move. Sarah comes to the conclusion that the time they kissed at the party ten years ago started everything. It caused Paul to finally leave Sarah and die on the plane. Then all the characters but Reuben start singing to Reuben about love and that tomorrow may never come. Sarah and Reuben continue their conversation. Sarah asks if he has moved on and started working again, but he has not. She offers a job to him as a new challenge. They start talking about "what ifs" and why they never called each other. They discover that they still have some of those feelings for each other and that they were real to both of them at one time.

==== Scene Five ====
Reuben goes back to Phil and Liz's place, this time looking for Liz. She is playing the piano and says she has written something for him, something goofy. He tells Liz that he has started dating Sarah, the girl from the past and that even though he fell in love with her ten years ago he cannot stop thinking of someone else. He does not understand how he can think of someone else when he is finally with the woman he wanted to spend his entire life with. Liz asks if he has told the other woman. Reuben has not, but he feels that she knows. Through the dialog it is almost apparent that Liz is the other woman. Reuben asks her to play the song; she starts but can't finish and bangs her hand on the piano. Phil shows up back from his run completely out of breath, gasping, and asking for water. Reuben tells Phil about dating Sarah, which excites Phil. Phil then reveals that he and Liz had just bought a house. When Liz leaves the room, though, he reveals that he ran into Mary, his ex-wife, and now does not feel the same about Liz.

==== Scene Six ====
Reuben is at the subway when he sees Donna waiting as well. They begin talking and Reuben asks if she would like to go to a coffee shop. They ask how each other have been and Donna tells how she has met someone new, Bob. She has started on her masters, a book club, and a bunch of other endeavors. Reuben notes that she used to be that way when they were younger and that is who he fell in love with. She feels that it was his fault that she became someone different, that he smothered her. Donna told him how he never let her win an argument and never listened to what she had to say. After she is done ripping into him she mentions that the kids would like to see him, Reuben says he will call.

==== Scene Seven ====
Reuben and Sarah go over to Phil and Liz's place for dinner. Sarah and Phil look at photos of the new house, while Reuben sits to the side, drinking and thinking about Donna. He remembers when they bought their first house and when they first conceived a baby. Sarah leaves to go check on her kids. Phil tells Reuben how great Sarah is and lucky he is to have her. Reuben does not seem too convinced. They talk about the time when a group of them went up to the cabin with their wives. They have different accounts of the time there. Phil remembers it as wonderful, while Reuben thought it was awful. Phil leaves to go check on dinner. Liz, who is celebrating her birthday that evening, enters with a new drink for Reuben. Liz does not like where they left off the last time they talked. Reuben seems to get annoyed with the subject. She seemingly thinks that Reuben's situation is improving. Reuben moves to another direction during the conversation and keeps referring to Liz as a child. Sarah enters the room unnoticed about halfway through the conversation, when Liz and Reuben kiss. Reuben backs away, saying that he is no good for anyone and that he will suck the life out of her. Liz tries to convince him that she cares for him, but he will not take it. Reuben comes up with a new theory, and feels that all that one can do is wait out their life, and that one should live alone out of respect for others.

Phil enters with some bread for an appetizer and tells Liz to continue stirring the dinner. Liz leaves, and they talk about how Liz has been able to accomplish so much with her nerve disease. Sarah suggests getting the tapenade for the bread, and Phil leaves to go get it. Sarah confronts Reuben about the kiss. Reuben talks about jumping out the window and goes to it and stares out it. He then flashes back to the party ten years ago. Phil, Paul and Donna enter the room. Later in the party, Phil explains that a revelation came to him while he was outside urinating; that each person is a particle floating around looking for an attachment, and that each person will always be alone in the end, so one can wait out life alone, or cherish one's own presence and surround themselves with loved ones, which Phil has decided to do later.

== Production history ==
Patience made its debut at the Tarragon Theatre in Toronto, Ontario. It made its U.S. debut in 2001 at the Wilma Theater in Philadelphia, Pennsylvania.

== Themes ==
The central question in this play is, "Are you happy with your life?" This is the concept that is present throughout the play. The long monologues try to give rhyme or reason to what has caused these tragic events in Reuben's life. But they are simply ways to try to help him cope with his losses. Reuben comes as a prime example of what not to do. He is overly self-centered and therefore he tries to blame everyone else. He never looks at himself and when he finally does at the end of the play he cannot bear it.

The point is that one is not able to control every outcome of life, whether events are connected or not. People must be able to be happy with themselves, and the outcomes will not matter. Another theme to this play could be how in 1997, a study was produced with findings that revealed that Jewish men had depression rates twice as high as non-Jewish men. The study's reasons were due to alcohol, but others came up with other conclusions. One in particular fits this play very well.

Dr. Susan Nolen-Hoeksema has attributed the greater susceptibility to depression to their more ruminative style of coping when distressed… it may explain the vulnerability to depression in Jewish men, whose religious training reinforces a ruminative quest for knowledge.

Reuben is obsessed with finding an answer; his inability to find that answer leads him farther and farther down the path of depression.

== Music ==
"For All We Know" is heard throughout the play. It is a song about living in and taking advantage of the present, centering on the lyrics "For tomorrow may never come". It falls within the constant message of the play, of being happy in one's own life.

== Works cited ==
- Doollie.com The Playwright's Database
- Karch, Pierre. “Jason Sherman”. Canadian Theatre Encyclopedia. October 25, 2006
- Holland, Julia. “Jason Sherman”. York University. July 28, 2005
- Osenlund, Kathryn. Patience. Curtain Up. September 24, 2001
- Rush, David. A Student Guide to Play Analysis . Southern Illinois University Press. Carbondale, 2005.
- Sherman, Jason. Patience. Playwright Canada Press. Toronto, Ontario, 1998
- “Why are Jewish men depressed? CrossCurrents Winter 2002/03”. Center for Addiction and Mental Health. February 21, 2005.
