= Jonny Harris =

Canadian actor & comedian (born 1975)

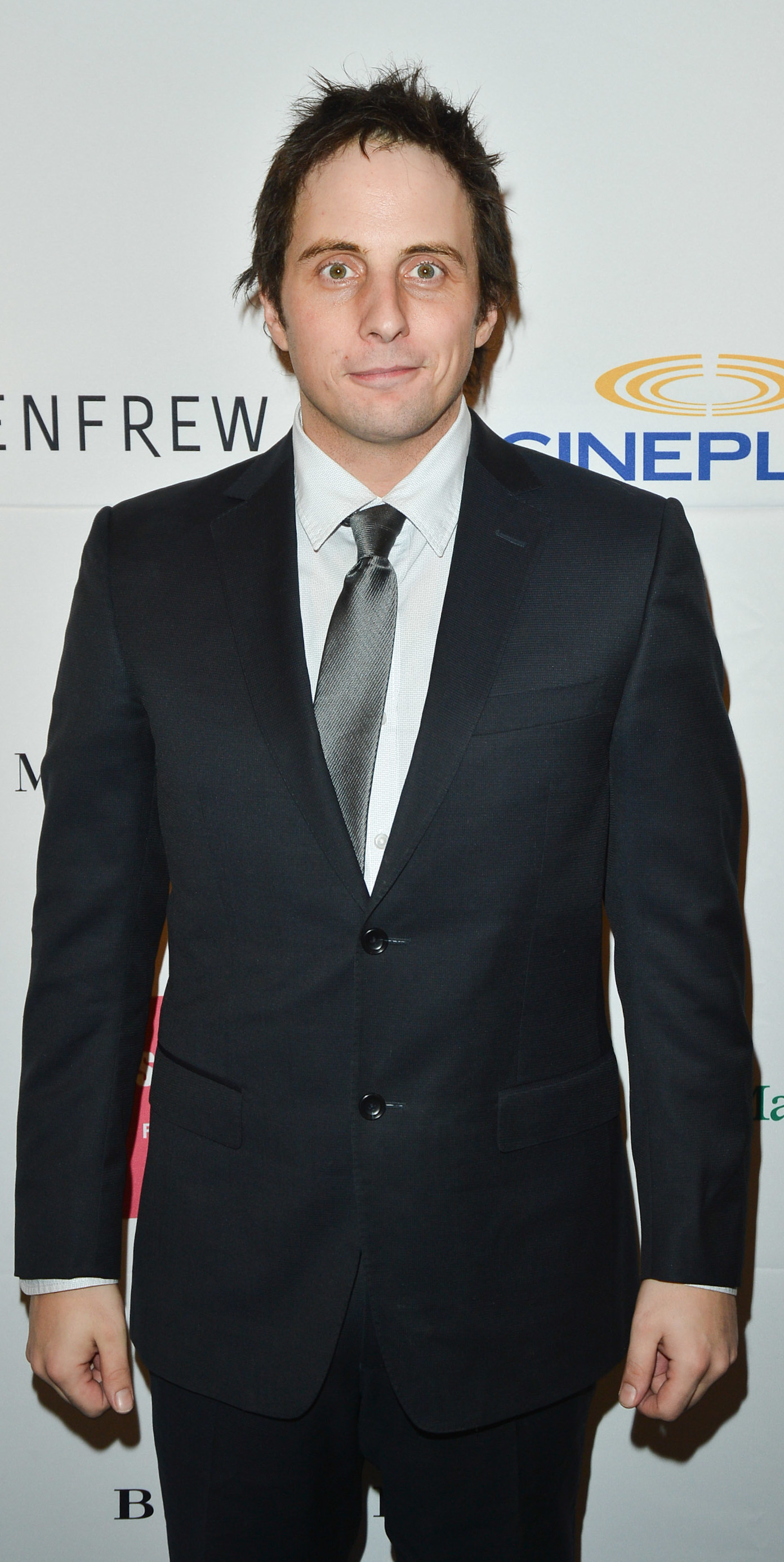
- Harris at the 2013 CFC Annual Gala & Auction
- Born: Jonathan Harris; Pouch Cove, Newfoundland and Labrador, Canada
- Occupation: Actor/Comedian
- Years active: 2006–present
- Spouse: Kaitlin Kozell

Jonathan Harris is a Canadian actor and comedian from Newfoundland and Labrador. Harris is best known for his roles in the television series Murdoch Mysteries, Still Standing and Hatching, Matching and Dispatching, as well as the films Young Triffie, Moving Day, and Grown Up Movie Star.

== Career ==
Harris worked for five summers at the Rising Tide Theatre festival in Trinity Bay, Newfoundland. As well as his television and film work, he has also performed as a comedian at the Winnipeg Comedy Festival, Just for Laughs Festival, and the Halifax Comedy Festival, as well as on the CBC Radio comedy series The Debaters. In 2015, he began starring in the summer comedy/reality series Still Standing for CBC Television. In 2018 he co-hosted the 6th Canadian Screen Awards telecast with Emma Hunter, broadcast on CBC-TV on March 11.

== Filmography ==
=== Film ===
Year	Title	Role	Notes
2006	Young Triffie	Billy Head	
2009	Grown Up Movie Star	Stuart	
2012	Moving Day	Dennis	
2013	Me2	Cop	Short film
2019	Goalie	Phil Sullivan	

=== Television ===
Year	Title	Role	Notes
2006	Hatching, Matching and Dispatching	Troy Furey	Episode: "1.2"
2006	Sketch with Kevin McDonald	Various	
2008–2025	Murdoch Mysteries	Constable George Crabtree	Main role Nominated – Gemini Award for Best Performance by an Actor in a Featured Supporting Role in a Dramatic Series (2008) & (2009)
2011	Republic of Doyle	Brett Babcock	Episode: "St. John's Town"
2011	Comedy Now!		Episode: "Jonny Harris"
2011	Murdoch Mysteries: The Curse of the Lost Pharaohs	Const. George Crabtree	Web series
2012	Murdoch Mysteries: The Murdoch Effect	Const. George Crabtree	Web series
2012	The Listener	Tommy Nordett	"The Bro Code"
2015	Murdoch Mysteries: The Infernal Device	Const. George Crabtree	Web series
2017	A Christmas Fury	Troy Furey	Television movie continuing Hatching, Matching and Dispatching.
2018	Frankie Drake Mysteries	George Crabtree	Episode: "The Pilot"

== Other work ==
Year	Title	Role	Notes
2009–2012	The Ha!ifax Comedy Fest	Writer	10 episodes
2010	CBC Winnipeg Comedy Festival	Writer	"The Holliday Show"
2010	Brighton Rock	Art department runner	
2015–present	Still Standing	Writer, producer & host	105 episodes Nominated - Canadian Screen Award for Best Host in a Lifestyle, Talk or Entertainment News Program or Series (2016); Nominated - Canadian Screen Award for Best Writing in a Factual Program or Series (shared with Chuck Byrn and Nile Séguin) (2016); Won - Canadian Screen Award for Best Host in a Lifestyle, Talk or Entertainment News Program or Series (2017); Won - Canadian Screen Award for Best Writing in a Factual Program or Series - "Vanastra" (shared with Fraser Young and Steve Dylan) (2017); Won - Canadian Screen Award for Best Writing in a Factual Program or Series - "Fort McMurray" (shared with Graham Chittenden, Fraser Young and Steve Dylan) (2018), Won - Canadian Screen Award for Best Writing in a Factual Program or Series - "Carcross" (shared with Graham Chittenden, Fraser Young and Steve Dylan) (2019); Won - Canadian Screen Award for Best Writing in a Factual Program or Series - "Churchill" (shared with Graham Chittenden, Fraser Young and Steve Dylan) (2020); Won - Canadian Screen Award for Best Writing in a Factual Program or Series - "Rankin Inlet" (shared with Graham Chittenden, Fraser Young and Steve Dylan) (2021); Won - WGC Screenwriting Award, Documentary — "Rankin Inlet" (shared with Graham Chittenden, Fraser Young and Steve Dylan) (2021)
