= Afghanada =

Canadian radio drama (2006–2011)

Afghanada is a Canadian radio drama which aired on CBC Radio One and Sirius Satellite Radio. The 103-episode series began on November 3, 2006, and concluded its sixth and final season on December 30, 2011.

== Overview ==
The half-hour episodes were broadcast on CBC Radio One Thursdays at 11:30 a.m. local time (3:30 p.m. Newfoundland Time) and 11 p.m. local time (11:30 p.m. Newfoundland Time), and on Sirius Satellite Radio channel 159 Wednesdays at 1 p.m. and 3 a.m. Eastern Time.

Afghanada was created by Jason Sherman, Andrew Moodie, Greg Nelson, and Adam Pettle. Other writers contributing to the series are Paul Aitken, Nicolas Billon, Dave Carley, Bruce Clark, Abigail Kinch, Hannah Moscovitch, Barbara Samuels, Emil Sher, Greg Spottiswood, Bobbie Theodore, Charlotte Corbeil-Coleman, Brendan Gall and Saul Levine. The executive producer of Season One was James Roy. The producer of Season Two was Bev Cooper. The executive producer of Seasons Three, Four, Five and Six was Gregory J. Sinclair.

Three Canadian soldiers have been shipped out to Afghanistan and are based deep in the heart of the conflict: Kandahar Province, where the Taliban insurgency is fiercest. Every day, Canadian soldiers on the ground confront the chaos and violence of life "outside the wire". They don't have the big picture; they're not interested in the policy. They're just trying to help the people, protect each other...and survive.

Afghanada was initially a four-part experiment in radio drama but grew into a six-season project with a 15-person crew and an audience of between 300,000 and 600,000 a week on radio and online.

The show used serving officers as consultants and benefited from hundreds of story ideas contributed from serving soldiers in the field to relay a sense of battle conditions and experiences.

== Cast ==
The members of the cast of Afghanada are Billy MacLellan as Private Lucas "Chucky" Manson, Jenny Young as Sergeant Patricia "Coach" Kinsella, and Paul Fauteux as Private Dean "The Machine" "Deaner" Donaldson. These actors portray the young Canadian soldiers at the core of the story. Additional cast members are: Michael Spencer Davis is Major Campbell, Trish Fagan is Hannah 'the Healer,' and Jordan Pettle is Master Corporal Jakes.

=== Remembrance Day Special 2007 ===
This special, produced before a live audience at the Canadian War Museum, aired on CBC Radio One on November 11 at 1:05 (1:35 NT), 4:05 PT.

== Awards ==
Afghanada won the Canadian Screenwriting Award in the Radio Drama Category from the Writers Guild of Canada in both 2007 and 2008. The Remembrance Day Special won a gold medal, for Best Radio Drama Special, and a silver medal, for Best Writing, at the 2008 International Radio Festival of New York.

MacLellan won the ACTRA Award for Outstanding Male Voice Performance in 2012.

== Merchandising ==
The first four seasons of the series have been collected and sold in CD format by the CBC's merchandising arm, CBCShop/boutique SRC. However, the final two seasons were distributed exclusively through iTunes. All six seasons are available through iTunes.
