= Jason Sherman =

Canadian playwright and screenwriter (born 1962)

Jason Sherman (born July 28, 1962, in Montreal, Quebec) is a Canadian playwright and screenwriter.

After graduating from the creative writing program at York University in 1985, Sherman co-founded What Publishing with Kevin Connolly, which produced what, a literary magazine that Sherman edited from 1985 to 1990. Sherman's reviews, essays, and interviews have appeared in various publications, including The Globe and Mail, Canadian Theatre Review, and Theatrum.

He edited two anthologies for Coach House Press, Canadian Brash (1991) and Solo (1993), and was playwright-in-residence at Tarragon Theatre from 1992 to 1999.

Sherman's first professional productions were A Place Like Pamela (1991) and To Cry is Not So (1991), followed by The League of Nathans (1992, published in book form in 1996), which won a Floyd S. Chalmers Canadian Play Award (1993). Among his other plays is Three in the Back, Two in the Head, which won the Governor General's Award for English-language drama (1995), and Reading Hebron.

In the November 2007 issue of This Magazine, Sherman wrote an article explaining why he would no longer be writing stage plays. Since then, he has written extensively for the CBC Radio series Afghanada and the television series Bloodletting & Miraculous Cures and The Best Laid Plans.

In 2021 he released My Tree, a documentary film about his trip to Israel to locate a tree that was planted in his name decades earlier. The film premiered at the 2021 Hot Docs Canadian International Documentary Festival, and received a Canadian Screen Award nomination for Best Feature Length Documentary at the 10th Canadian Screen Awards in 2022.

== Works ==
- A Place Like Pamela (1991)
- To Cry is Not So (1991)
- The League of Nathans (1992)
- What the Russians Say (1993)
- Field (1993)
- The Merchant of Showboat (1993)
- Three in the Back, Two in the Head (1994)
- Reading Hebron (1995)
- The Retreat (1996)
- None is Too Many (1997)
- Patience (1998)
- It's All True (1999)
- An Acre of Time (1999–2000)
- Afghanada (2006–11) (co-creator)
- Bloodletting & Miraculous Cures (2010) (teleplay)
- We Were Children (2012) (screenplay)
- La Ronde (2013) (adaptation, Soulpepper)
- Copy That (2019) (Tarragon Theatre)
- My Tree (2021)
