= Still Standing (Canadian TV series) =

Canadian comedy-reality television series

- Genre: Comedy/Reality
- Written by: Jonny Harris; Fraser Young; Graham Chittenden; Steve Dylan
- Directed by: Sebastian Cluer
- Starring: Jonny Harris
- Country of origin: Canada
- No. of seasons: 11
- No. of episodes: 121

Production
- Executive producers: Jeff Peeler, Catherine Legge, Jamie Brown
- Producers: Jonny Harris and Sebastian Cluer
- Running time: 22 minutes
- Production company: Frantic Films

Original release
- Network: CBC Television
- Release: June 23, 2015 – present

Still Standing is a Canadian television series that premiered on CBC Television in 2015. The show's tagline slogan is "towns that are against the ropes but still hanging in there", reflecting the show's premise to tell the "story of small towns in Canada and how they overcome struggles". It is based on the Danish television series Gintberg på kanten (Gintberg on the edge).

A hybrid comedy and reality series, the program features actor and comedian Jonny Harris. In each episode, Harris travels to small Canadian communities which are financially struggling but "still standing" and spends time getting to know the residents and their lifestyles. At the end of the trip, Harris performs a stand-up comedy show for the town's residents, into which he integrates some of his newfound insights about life in their community. In the television format, however, clips from the comedy show are interspersed throughout the episode rather than occurring specifically at the end. The show is produced by Frantic Films.

The show premiered on June 23, 2015, with an episode set in Bamfield, British Columbia.

== Filming ==
To be considered for a show, a community must submit a proposal to the show's producers, who then select a subset of those proposals for inclusion in that season's programming. The order of filming is independent of the order of episode broadcasting. (Note: For example, the town of Wells, British Columbia was the first community filmed for Season 4, but was the last broadcast of that season.) Filming occurs during the three hiatuses in the filming of Murdoch Mysteries, in which Harris is part of the main cast.

A producer visits the town before the filming crew arrives to become familiar with the community. The crew then spends five days in the community, the first four of which are spent filming scenery and conducting interviews. Most of the segments are planned in advance, including Harris interviewing local individuals. The filming schedule is flexible to allow the crew to film events "on the fly". The crew consists of 10 to 16 members who are billeted during the filming.

== Comedy show ==
The visit culminates in a comedy performance by Harris at a local venue on the fifth day. The event is free to attend on a first come, first served basis, and features performances by other stand-up comics. In the show, Harris discusses the residents, and the community's difficulties and response to those difficulties. Harris said he was "worried that they (local residents) might be apprehensive" about the show and its subject, but found that instead "they were laid back". He stated that "people are not overly sensitive, and are just up for the laugh".

The stand-up routine typically includes inside jokes that may not be included in the episode that is broadcast.

== Episodes ==
=== Series overview ===
Season	Episodes	Originally aired	
Season	Episodes	First aired	Last aired
1	13	23 June 2015	29 September 2015
2	13	15 June 2016	20 September 2016
3	13	27 June 2017	12 September 2017
4	13	18 September 2018	11 December 2018
5	13	17 September 2019	10 December 2019
6	10	6 October 2020	8 December 2020
7	10	5 January 2022	30 March 2022
8	10	4 January 2023	8 March 2023
9	10	26 September 2023	28 November 2023
10	8	8 October 2024	3 December 2024
11	8	6 January 2026	17 March 2026

=== Season 1 (2015) ===
No. overall	No. in season	Location	Original release date
1	1	Bamfield, British Columbia	23 June 2015
2	2	Coleman, Alberta	30 June 2015
3	3	Souris, Prince Edward Island	7 July 2015
4	4	Willow Bunch, Saskatchewan	28 July 2015
5	5	Berwick, Nova Scotia	4 August 2015
6	6	Oil Springs, Ontario	11 August 2015
7	7	Lytton, British Columbia	18 August 2015
8	8	Manitou, Manitoba	25 August 2015
9	9	Wawa, Ontario	1 September 2015
10	10	Teeswater, Ontario	8 September 2015
11	11	Rowley, Alberta	15 September 2015
12	12	North Buxton, Ontario and South Buxton, Ontario	22 September 2015
13	13	Fogo Island, Newfoundland and Labrador	29 September 2015

=== Season 2 (2016) ===
No. overall	No. in season	Location	Original release date
14	1	Skidegate, British Columbia	15 June 2016
15	2	Vanastra, Ontario	21 June 2016
16	3	Georgetown, Prince Edward Island	28 June 2016
17	4	Fort Coulonge, Quebec	5 July 2016
18	5	Telkwa, British Columbia	12 July 2016
19	6	Eganville, Ontario	19 July 2016
20	7	McAdam, New Brunswick	26 July 2016
21	8	Inuvik, Northwest Territories	2 August 2016
22	9	Omemee, Ontario	24 August 2016
23	10	Stanstead, Quebec	30 August 2016
24	11	Mabou, Nova Scotia	8 September 2016
25	12	Pilot Mound, Manitoba	13 September 2016
26	13	Maple Creek, Saskatchewan	20 September 2016

=== Season 3 (2017) ===
No. overall	No. in season	Location	Original release date
27	1	Fort McMurray, Alberta	27 June 2017
28	2	Bell Island, Newfoundland and Labrador	27 June 2017
29	3	Manitou Beach, Saskatchewan	4 July 2017
30	4	Mattawa, Ontario	11 July 2017
31	5	Edgerton, Alberta	18 July 2017
32	6	Avondale, Newfoundland and Labrador	25 July 2017
33	7	Lake Cowichan, British Columbia	1 August 2017
34	8	Reston, Manitoba	8 August 2017
35	9	Tumbler Ridge, British Columbia	15 August 2017
36	10	Norwood, Ontario	22 August 2017
37	11	Vulcan, Alberta	29 August 2017
38	12	Gilbert Plains, Manitoba	5 September 2017
39	13	South River, Ontario	12 September 2017

=== Season 4 (2018) ===
No. overall	No. in season	Location	Original release date
40	1	Tignish, Prince Edward Island	18 September 2018
41	2	Carcross, Yukon	25 September 2018
42	3	Rogersville, New Brunswick	2 October 2018
43	4	Fraser Lake, British Columbia	9 September 2018
44	5	Cobalt, Ontario	16 October 2018
45	6	New Denmark, New Brunswick	23 October 2018
46	7	Wilberforce, Ontario	30 October 2018
47	8	Tyendinaga Mohawk Territory, Ontario	6 November 2018
48	9	Huntingdon, Quebec	13 November 2018
49	10	Radisson, Saskatchewan	20 November 2018
50	11	Canso, Nova Scotia	27 November 2018
51	12	Minto, Manitoba	4 December 2018
52	13	Wells, British Columbia	11 December 2018

=== Season 5 (2019) ===
No. overall	No. in season	Location	Original release date
53	1	Campobello Island, New Brunswick	17 September 2019
54	2	Schreiber, Ontario	24 September 2019
55	3	Harrison Hot Springs, British Columbia	1 October 2019
56	4	East Preston, Nova Scotia	8 October 2019
57	5	Churchill, Manitoba	15 October 2019
58	6	Fortune, Newfoundland and Labrador	22 October 2019
59	7	Nipigon, Ontario	29 October 2019
60	8	Harbour Grace, Newfoundland and Labrador	5 November 2019
61	9	Gravelbourg, Saskatchewan	12 November 2019
62	10	Bristol, Quebec	19 November 2019
63	11	Lumby, British Columbia	26 November 2019
64	12	Calabogie, Ontario	3 December 2019
65	13	Siksika Nation, Alberta	10 December 2019

=== Season 6 (2020) ===
No. overall	No. in season	Location	Original release date
66	1	Pelee Island, Ontario	6 October 2020
67	2	Bear River, Nova Scotia	13 October 2020
68	3	Lillooet, British Columbia	20 October 2020
69	4	Vittoria, Ontario	27 October 2020
70	5	Woody Point, Newfoundland and Labrador	10 November 2020
71	6	Pinawa, Manitoba	17 November 2020
72	7	Cap-Pelé, New Brunswick	24 November 2020
73	8	Botwood, Newfoundland and Labrador	1 December 2020
74	9	Turner Valley, Alberta	8 December 2020
75	10	Rankin Inlet, Nunavut	8 December 2020

=== Season 7 (2022) ===
Filming for the seventh season was delayed because of the COVID-19 pandemic in Canada. As a result of the ongoing pandemic, filming followed screening tests and other protocols, and during the show guests were seated in physically separated cohorts. After the show, Harris did not meet with the guests as he had done in previous seasons.

Ten episodes were made for season 7.

No. overall	No. in season	Location	Original release date
76	1	Hope, British Columbia	5 January 2022
77	2	Port Stanley, Ontario	12 January 2022
78	3	Wakefield, Quebec	19 January 2022
79	4	Chemainus, British Columbia	26 January 2022
80	5	Minden, Ontario	23 February 2022
81	6	Middleton, Nova Scotia	2 March 2022
82	7	Warkworth, Ontario	9 March 2022
83	8	Oxford, Nova Scotia	16 March 2022
84	9	St. Laurent, Manitoba	23 March 2022
85	10	Fenelon Falls, Ontario	30 March 2022

=== Season 8 (2023) ===
The eighth season of the show consisted of 10 episodes broadcast during winter 2023.

No. overall	No. in season	Location	Original release date
86	1	Gibsons, British Columbia	4 January 2023
87	2	Oneida, Ontario	11 January 2023
88	3	Morden, Manitoba	18 January 2023
89	4	Lac La Biche, Alberta	25 January 2023
90	5	Goderich, Ontario	1 February 2023
91	6	Ucluelet, British Columbia	8 February 2023
92	7	Markdale, Ontario	15 February 2023
93	8	Okanagan Falls, British Columbia	22 February 2023
94	9	Wabush, Newfoundland and Labrador	1 March 2023
95	10	New Richmond Gaspé, Quebec	8 March 2023

=== Season 9 (2023) ===
The ninth season of Still Standing consisted of ten episodes broadcast starting in September 2023. Harris stated that he had been interested in featuring Dawson City on the show, but the city never "fit the bill as a struggling town" until the decline of tourism to the city following the COVID-19 pandemic.

No. overall	No. in season	Location	Original release date
96	1	Amherstburg, Ontario	26 September 2023
97	2	Gracefield, Quebec	3 October 2023
98	3	Southport, Manitoba	10 October 2023
99	4	Slave Lake, Alberta	17 October 2023
100	5	Dawson City, Yukon	24 October 2023
101	6	Temagami, Ontario	31 October 2023
102	7	High River, Alberta	7 November 2023
103	8	M'Chigeeng First Nation, Ontario	14 November 2023
104	9	Gander, Newfoundland and Labrador	21 November 2023
105	10	Membertou First Nation, Nova Scotia	28 November 2023

=== Season 10 (2024) ===
No. overall	No. in season	Location	Original release date
106	1	Chippewas of Rama First Nation, Ontario	8 October 2024
107	2	Prince Rupert, British Columbia	15 October 2024
108	3	Smiths Falls, Ontario	22 October 2024
109	4	Windsor, Nova Scotia	29 October 2024
110	5	Kimberley, British Columbia	12 November 2024
111	6	Elliot Lake, Ontario	19 November 2024
112	7	Sioux Valley Dakota Nation, Manitoba	26 November 2024
113	8	New Glasgow, Nova Scotia	3 December 2024

=== Season 11 (2026) ===
No. overall	No. in season	Location	Original release date
114	1	Osoyoos Indian Band, British Columbia	6 January 2026
115	2	Glace Bay, Nova Scotia	13 January 2026
116	3	Arnprior, Ontario	20 January 2026
117	4	Grand Manan, New Brunswick	27 January 2026
118	5	Acton, Ontario	3 February 2026
119	6	Lennox Island First Nation, Prince Edward Island	24 February 2026
120	7	Flin Flon, Manitoba	3 March 2026
121	8	St. Thomas, Ontario	17 March 2026

== Broadcast ==
In Canada the show airs on CBC television and is also available to stream on CBC Gem and CBC's YouTube channel.

In the United States the series is available on Tubi, Amazon Prime, and The Roku Channel. Seasons 6 and 7 were released exclusively on Tubi in April 2022. The series is also available on Pluto TV in the US.

== Reception ==
Television critic John Doyle, writing in The Globe and Mail, stated that Harris is "extremely good at connecting with the local people".

== Awards ==
=== Canadian Screen Awards ===
Year	Category	Nominee	Result	Reference
2016	Best factual program or series	Still Standing	Won	
2016	Best host in a lifestyle, talk or entertainment news program or series	Jonny Harris	Nominated	
2016	Best editing in a factual program or series	Jorge Parra, Robert Kew and Tony Coleman (episode: Buxton)	Nominated	
2016	Best writing in a factual program or series	Jonny Harris, Chuck Byrn and Nile Séguin (episode: Buxton)	Nominated	
2017	Best factual program or series	Still Standing	Won	
2017	Best host in a lifestyle, talk or entertainment news program or series	Jonny Harris	Won	
2017	Best direction in a documentary or factual series	Sebastian Cluer (episode: Vanastra)	Nominated	
2017	Best writing in a factual program or series	Jonny Harris, Fraser Young and Steve Dylan (episode: Vanastra)	Won	
2018	Best editing in a factual program or series	Jorge Parra (episode: Manitou Beach)	Nominated	
2018	Best writing in a factual program or series	Jonny Harris, Fraser Young, Steve Dylan and Graham Chittenden (episode: Fort McMurray)	Won	
2019	Best factual program or series	Still Standing	Nominated	
2019	Best host in a program or series	Jonny Harris	Won	
2019	Best editorial research	Maya Bilbao (episode: Carcross)	Nominated	
2019	Best writing in a factual program or series	Jonny Harris, Fraser Young, Steve Dylan and Graham Chittenden (episode: Carcross)	Won	
2020	Best host in a factual series or reality competition	Jonny Harris	Nominated	
2020	Best editorial research	Shayla Howell, Maya Bilbao and Arden Wray (episode: "East Preston")	Nominated	
2020	Best photography in a documentary or factual program or series	Jeff Cole (episode: "Churchill")	Nominated	
2020	Best editing in a factual program or series	Jorge Parra (episode: "Churchill")	Nominated	
2020	Best direction in a factual program or series	Sebastian Cluer (episode: "Siksika Nation")	Nominated	
2020	Best writing in a factual program or series	Jonny Harris, Fraser Young, Steve Dylan and Graham Chittenden (episode: "Churchill")	Won	
2021	Best host or presenter, factual or reality/competition series	Jonny Harris	Nominated	
2021	Best editing in a factual program or series	Jorge Parra (episode: "Pelee Island")	Nominated	
2021	Best writing for factual program or series	Jonny Harris, Fraser Young, Graham Chittenden and Steve Dylan (episode: "Rankin Inlet")	Won	
2023	Best host or presenter, factual or reality/competition series	Jonny Harris	Nominated	
2023	Best directing in a factual program or series	Sebastien Cluer (episode: "St. Laurent")	Nominated	
2023	Best directing in a factual program or series	Andrew Murray (episode: "Wakefield")	Nominated	
2023	Best writing in a factual program or series	Jonny Harris, Fraser Young, Steve Dylan and Graham Chittenden (episode: "Oxford")	Won	
2024	Best host or presenter, factual or reality/competition series	Jonny Harris	Nominated	
2024	Best directing in a factual program or series	Eva Thomas (episode: "New Richmond")	Won	
2024	Best writing in a factual program or series	Jonny Harris, Fraser Young, Steve Dylan, Graham Chittenden, and Aisha Brown (episode: "Oneida of the Thames")	Nominated	

== See also ==
- Rick Mercer Report
