= Darrin Rose =

Canadian stand-up comedian, actor, and writer

- Born: Darrin Rowsell; Oshawa, Ontario, Canada
- Education: Concordia University
- Notable work: Video On Trial, Mr. D

Comedy career
- Medium: Stand-up, Television
- Subjects: Everyday life, Observational

Darrin Rose (born Darrin Rowsell) is a Canadian stand-up comedian, actor, and writer. He was host of the Canadian remake of Match Game, and played Bill the bartender on the sitcom Mr. D for eight seasons. He plays Doc on Letterkenny, and Will/Dad on the HBO Max series Home Sweet Rome.

== Early life ==
Born in Oshawa, Rose graduated from Concordia University. He owned a software company and worked in marketing for Heinz before getting into comedy after his friend Cabbie Richards became successful on TSN.

== Career ==
Rose started stand-up after watching the Jerry Seinfeld documentary Comedian. He had his own stand-up special on CTV, which earned him a Canadian Screen Award nomination for Best Performance in a Comedy/Variety Special. He did stand-up on The Late Late Show twice, and was on Last Comic Standing. Rose got his first big break on TV when he became a regular on Much Music's Video on Trial, and its spin-off Love Court. He later played Bill the Bartender on the CBC Television series Mr. D, and was nominated for Canadian Screen Award for Best Supporting Actor in a Comedy for his role. He was the host of Match Game on the Comedy Network, the Canadian version of the long-running American game show. He played Coach Malloy in the Disney movie The Swap and attended the premiere in Hollywood. He wrote on the CBS sitcom Happy Together starring Damon Wayans Jr. in Los Angeles. He plays Doc on Letterkenny, and Will/Dad on the HBO Max show Home Sweet Rome. He wrote and directed the short film One Last Last Heist, which played at many film festivals and was an Official Selection of the Tribeca Film Festival, where it was nominated for Best Narrative Short. Sony developed One Last Last Heist for television.
