= Mermaid Theatre of Nova Scotia =

Theatre in Nova Scotia, Canada

Mermaid Theatre of Nova Scotia was co-founded in 1972 in Wolfville, Nova Scotia, by the late Evelyn Garbary, Tom Miller, and Sara Lee Lewis who continues to serve as Managing Director. The Theatre moved to Windsor, Nova Scotia in 1987, purchasing a large commercial building in the town's center, which now houses its workshops, administration, rehearsal and performance facilities. The company was registered under the Societies Act of Nova Scotia, and received charitable status with Revenue Canada in March 1973.

== Aims ==
With a mandate to introduce young audiences to the joys of reading and the excitement of puppetry, the company has established a touring circuit encompassing rural Nova Scotia as well as national and international venues.

The company draws its scripts from children's literature and has performed for more than 4.5 million spectators on four continents. It has appeared regularly in the US since 1979. The company tours year-round, generally presenting more than 400 performances for close to 200,000 spectators annually. In recognition of its contributions to local economy and cultural life, Mermaid has earned export awards from Nova Scotia (2001) and Canada's Department of International Trade (2001, 2005), and has been recognized by the Canadian Arts Presenting Association with an award for Best Performing Group.

The company regularly crosses Canada and the United States and has represented Canada in numerous other countries. Since they began touring internationally, they have performed in Japan, Mexico, Australia, England, Northern Ireland, Holland, Scotland, Wales, Hong Kong, Macau, Singapore, South Korea, Taiwan, Vietnam, and Ireland.

Mermaid Theatre's focus is twofold. On the one hand Mermaid's professional touring theatre provides international showcase opportunities for Atlantic Region talent; on the other, the aim of its Youtheatre program, now in its sixteenth season, is to encourage creative self-expression among the region's adolescents.

Puppetry is central to Mermaid's philosophy of theatre. Through its Institute of Puppetry Arts, Mermaid offers puppet theatre residencies and internships, as well as apprenticeship training in both production and performance that is not otherwise available in Anglophone Canada.

== Awards ==
Two Citations of Excellence for Puppetry by UNIMA-USA 2010

Award for Excellence in Artist Management - Atlantic Presenters Association 2009

Crystal Tourism Ambassador Award - Tourism Industry of Nova Scotia 2008

Cultural Industries Export Award 2005

Nova Scotia Export Award 2001

Canada Export Award 2001

Citation of Excellence for Puppetry by UNIMA-USA 1986,1989

== Mermaid Imperial Performing Arts Centre ==
In 2003, Mermaid Theatre of Nova Scotia acquired the former Imperial Theatre at 106 Gerrish Street in Windsor. The theatre was built between 1910 and 1920, and originally was used as a movie theatre and performing venue. At the time of the acquisition, the facility had been sitting vacant for several years. Over the next several years, with the assistance of local, provincial, and national partners, the space has been converted to a performing arts centre. The facility has been renamed the Mermaid Imperial Performing Arts Centre (or MIPAC). Since 2008, the facility has been used to host a regular schedule of performances, from Mermaid Theatre's own flagship productions, to community shows and nationally touring productions.

== See also ==
- Mermaid Theatre (London)
