= Mr. D =

- Genre: Sitcom
- Created by: Gerry Dee; Michael Volpe
- Starring: Gerry Dee; Jonathan Torrens; Lauren Hammersley; Booth Savage; Bette MacDonald; Naomi Snieckus; Darrin Rose; Mark Little; Wes Williams; Mark Forward
- Opening theme: "I'm Awesome" by Spose
- Country of origin: Canada
- Original language: English
- No. of seasons: 8
- No. of episodes: 88

Production
- Executive producers: Gerry Dee; Michael Volpe
- Production location: Halifax, Nova Scotia
- Running time: Approx. 22 minutes
- Production companies: Topsail Entertainment; Gerard ADHD Entertainment

Original release
- Network: CBC
- Release: January 9, 2012 – December 18, 2018

Mr. D is a Canadian television series starring comedian Gerry Dee. The series follows the misadventures of an under-qualified schoolteacher named Gerry Duncan, nicknamed Mr. D. It debuted on the CBC on January 9, 2012, and concluded after eight seasons on December 19, 2018.

On December 11, 2020, Mr. D became available for streaming in the United States on Amazon Prime Video.

== Cast ==
- Gerry Dee as Gerry Duncan: an under-qualified high school social studies teacher who prefers to be called Mr. D by the children and is jealous when the school's actual Mr. D (Paul Dwyer) returns to Xavier Academy. During season 8, he is promoted to the role of principal of Xavier Academy.
- Jonathan Torrens as Robert Cheeley: Robert is the vice principal of the school but his bizarre character traits make it difficult for his colleagues to respect him. He becomes co-principal with Lisa in season 6 and sole principal at the end of season 6. In Season 8, he is co-vice-principal with Mr. Dwyer.
- Lauren Hammersley as Lisa Mason: a competent and responsible former teacher and principal, known for her traditional teaching style. She has a Masters in Education and a PhD in Medieval literature. In the seventh season, she is the school guidance counselor.
- Bette MacDonald as Trudy Walsh: the school secretary who runs much of the day-to-day business at Xavier Academy.
- Naomi Snieckus as Bobbi Galka: the confident and respected PE teacher at Xavier Academy.
- Darrin Rose as Bill Cogill: Gerry's roommate and a womanizing bachelor who works as the local bartender, until the bar closes in the final season. He then runs a smoothie bar at Xavier Academy.
- Mark Little as Simon Hunt: the science teacher of the school, he is weak and a typical science geek who is also assistant coach of the girls' basketball team.
- Wes Williams as Paul Dwyer: Paul is cool and loved by all the teachers, and was the original Mr. D to the children before he left. During the final season, he is the co-vice-principal of Xavier Academy with Robert Cheeley. Gerry is often jealous of Dwyer and feels that he is in competition with him.
- Suresh John as Malik: the mysterious school custodian with an unusual history.
- Kathleen Phillips as Emma Terdie: Emma is the librarian who runs a tight ship and demands that rules are followed and that things are always done by the book in her library.
- Bill Wood as Frank: the school's guidance counselor and assistant basketball coach to Mr. D. He uses crutches to walk.
- Emma Hunter as Nisha Corcoran, who is hired in season 5 to replace Mr. D when he's fired by Ms. Mason. She has a relationship with Mr. Hunt.
- Booth Savage as Principal Mike Callaghan from season 1 to season 4. He retires at the end of season 4 to be replaced by one of the teachers, Lisa Mason.
- Ahmad Harhash as Matthew: who cause trouble to teacher

=== Main characters ===
Actor	Character	Seasons										
Actor	Character	1	2	3	4	5	6	7	8			
Gerry Dee	Gerry Duncan	Main	Main	Main	Main	Main	Main	Main	Main			
Jonathan Torrens	Robert Cheeley	Main	Main	Main	Main	Main	Main	Main	Main			
Lauren Hammersley	Lisa Mason	Main	Main	Main	Main	Main	Main	Main	Main			
Bette MacDonald	Trudy Walsh	Main	Main	Main	Main	Main	Main	Main	Main			
Naomi Snieckus	Bobbi Galka	Main	Main	Main	Main	Main	Main	Main	Main			
Darrin Rose	Bill Cogill	Main	Main	Main	Main	Main	Main	Main	Main			
Mark Little	Simon Hunt	Main	Main	Main	Main	Main	Main	Main	Main			
Wes Williams	Paul Dwyer	Main	Main	Main	Main	Main	Main	Main	Main			
Suresh John	Mr. Malik	Main	Main	Main	Main	Main	Main	Main	Main			
Mark Forward	Wayne Leung	Main	Main	Main								
Kathleen Phillips	Emma Terdie				Main	Main	Main	Main	Main			
Emma Hunter	Nisha Corcoran					Main	Main	Main	Main			
Booth Savage	Principal Mike Callaghan	Main	Main	Main	Main							
Bill Wood	Frank		Guest		Guest	Main	Main	Main	Main			
Dave Merheje	Dave Bechara							Recurring	Recurring			
Jordan Poole	Alex	Recurring	Recurring	Recurring	Recurring	Recurring	Recurring	Recurring	Recurring	Ahmad Harhash	Matthew	Recurring

== Production ==
Creator, writer, executive producer and star Gerry Dee based Mr. D on his ten years teaching physical education in high school before he left for a career in stand-up comedy in 2003. The pilot episode was directed by Steve Wright and produced by Gerry Dee and Michael Volpe. The show is filmed on location at Citadel High School in Halifax, Nova Scotia.

On April 3, 2013, Mr. D was renewed for a third season, and on April 4, 2014, the show was renewed for a fourth season.

For the fourth season, the CBC included the series in a production deal with City. Under the deal, Mr. D and City's new sitcom Young Drunk Punk will each air on their own originating network in the winter of the 2014–15 television season, then swap networks for a second run in the fall of the 2015–16 season.

On March 4, 2015, the CBC announced that Mr. D had been renewed for a fifth season. On February 16, 2016, the CBC announced that Mr. D had been renewed for a sixth season.

On April 6, 2017, Dee confirmed the show had been renewed for a seventh season.

On March 11, 2018, the show was renewed for an eighth season. Dee confirmed this would be the show's last.

In 2018, the Canadian Media Producers Association reported that Mr. D had generated $126.5 million and created 1,425 jobs over its eight seasons.

== Episodes ==
=== Series overview ===
Season	Episodes	Originally released	
Season	Episodes	First released	Last released
1	12	January 9, 2012	April 2, 2012
2	13	January 7, 2013	April 17, 2013
3	8	February 23, 2014	April 14, 2014
4	13	January 20, 2015	April 14, 2015
5	13	January 19, 2016	April 12, 2016
6	10	October 18, 2016	December 27, 2016
7	11	September 26, 2017	December 5, 2017
8	8	November 1, 2018	December 19, 2018

=== Season 1 (2012) ===
No. overall	No. in season	Title	Directed by	Written by	Original release date	Canadian viewers (millions)
1	1	"Pilot"	Steve Wright	Adam Reid, Max Reid, Gerry Dee	January 9, 2012	1.23
Gerry Duncan has finally gotten a full-time teaching position at the prestigious Xavier Academy after years of substituting. Unfortunately he'll be teaching social studies, which he knows nothing about, instead of his dream physical education (PE) job.
2	2	"24 Hour Famine"	Mike Clattenburg	Josh Gal	January 16, 2012	0.94
Gerry volunteers to help at a 24-hour Famine event to spend time with Eva MacPhee.
3	3	"Grade the Teacher"	Steve Wright	Gerry Dee, Kurt Smeaton	January 23, 2012	0.83
Gerry tries to match Dwyer in positive reviews on a website; Simon stands up to a student.
4	4	"Exam Week"	Shawn Alex Thompson	Gerry Dee	January 30, 2012	0.89
Gerry struggles to get his students to write his only version of the exam; Dwyer donates his father's foosball table and Simon's obsession goes a little too far.
5	5	"Bully Awareness Week"	Steve Wright	Gerry Dee	February 6, 2012	0.67
Gerry decides to make a video presentation for Bully Awareness Week.
6	6	"The Dance"	Steve Wright	Sara Snow	February 13, 2012	0.68
Gerry organizes a dance as a fundraiser for the girls basketball team; Robert tells Lisa he had a dream about Trudy.
7	7	"Job Opportunity"	Steve Wright	Andrew De Angelis	February 20, 2012	0.81
Gerry tries to get a job as a physical education teacher after a position opens up; Lisa has troubles with her new student-teacher.
8	8	"Guest Speaker"	Mike Clattenburg	Kurt Smeaton	March 5, 2012	N/A
Gerry has trouble finding a guest speaker for career day; Robert tries to avoid the flu. Guest star: Mike Cammalleri as himself
9	9	"Quiz Cup"	Steve Wright	Steve Dylan, Mark Forward	March 12, 2012	N/A
Gerry helps Lisa coach the Quiz Cup team; Robert tries to get back at Trudy after she continually pranks him.
10	10	"Field Trip"	Steve Wright	Gerry Dee	March 19, 2012	N/A
Gerry helps Bobby and Simon chaperone a field trip; Robert tries to finish his letter for the upcoming school newsletter.
11	11	"The Basketball Diaries"	Keith Samples	Michael Volpe, Sara Snow	March 26, 2012	0.51
Gerry convinces Lisa to act as his girlfriend when he is invited out by a rival basketball coach; Robert tries to organize a milestone celebration in honour of Mr. Callaghan.
12	12	"Charity Day"	Keith Samples	Sara Snow	April 2, 2012	0.73
Gerry and Mr. Dwyer fight in a charity boxing match; Robert tries to befriend Lisa after she finds his phone.

=== Season 2 (2013) ===
No. overall	No. in season	Title	Directed by	Written by	Original release date	Canadian viewers (millions)
13	1	"Gerry's Evaluation"	Keith Samples	Kurt Smeaton	January 7, 2013	0.609
Gerry tries to make a good impression when a member of the school board is sent to evaluate his teaching abilities. Robert tries to become more aggressive. Guest star: Russell Peters as Mr. Green
14	2	"Late Shift"	Steve Wright	Jessie Gabe	January 14, 2013	N/A
Gerry takes on a second job in order to afford a new car, but things get complicated when one of his students gets a job at the same place. Robert is in charge of negotiating budget cuts to the library.
15	3	"World Religions"	Jacob Tierney	Gerry Dee	January 21, 2013	N/A
Gerry brings his own personal beliefs to a lesson about world religions. Robert tries to outdo Trudy when she buys a better birthday gift for Mr. Callaghan. Simon has a crush on a substitute teacher.
16	4	"Overnight Trip"	Steve Wright	Andrew De Angelis	January 30, 2013	N/A
Gerry organizes an overnight class trip to Boston where he plans to sneak off and go to a basketball game with Bill. However, his plans are put in jeopardy when Robert decides to be a chaperone. Guest Appearance: Nathan MacKinnon and Cameron Critchlow as themselves
17	5	"The Crush"	Jacob Tierney	Gerry Dee	February 5, 2013	N/A
Gerry develops a crush on the Scottish mother of one of his most annoying students; Trudy and Robert make a mockery of morning announcements.
18	6	"The Other Woman"	Keith Samples	Michael Volpe	February 13, 2013	N/A
Gerry finds an opportunity when Bobbi and Craig end their relationship; Robert punishes Leung's unruly students.
19	7	"The Date"	Steve Wright	Mark Forward	February 27, 2013	N/A
An elite escort ruins Gerry's date with Jean McGrory when she makes him appear to be a john.
20	8	"Gerry's Favourite Couple"	Keith Samples	Jonathan Torrens	March 5, 2013	N/A
Gerry interferes in Sean and Miranda's relationship drama.
21	9	"Poker Night"	Jacob Tierney	Gerry Dee	March 20, 2013	N/A
Gerry orchestrates a staff poker night, to get a friend back on their feet. Guest star: Daniel Negreanu as himself
22	10	"Staff Retreat"	Steve Wright	Kurt Smeaton	March 27, 2013	N/A
The staff members get involved in a trust game that reveals their darkest secrets; Callaghan and Malik engage in some friendly competition.
23	11	"Culture Day"	Steve Wright	Gerry Dee	April 3, 2013	N/A
It's Culture Day at Xavier and each teacher has been asked to model their classroom after a country.
24	12	"Strip Club"	Keith Samples	Gerry Dee	April 10, 2013	N/A
Dwyer's after-hours activities catch a suspicious Gerry's attention; Lisa goes all out for Secretary Day.
25	13	"Slam Dunk"	Steve Wright	Mark Forward & Andrew De Angelis	April 17, 2013	N/A
Gerry tries to get his girls' basketball team cancelled game to go on to try to win, so he can coach the Senior Boys volleyball team. Mr Cheely conducts teacher evaluations.

=== Season 3 (2014) ===
No. overall	No. in season	Title	Directed by	Written by	Original release date	Canadian viewers (millions)
26	1	"Parent Teacher Night"	Steve Wright	Jonathan Torrens	February 23, 2014	N/A
When Mr. D has only one opportunity to meet Paul Henderson and have his priceless Team Canada jersey signed, he won't let Xavier Academy's parent-teacher night get in the way. Guest star: Paul Henderson as himself
27	2	"Old School"	Keith Samples	Andrew De Angelis	March 3, 2014	N/A
Gerry decides he's going to make an impression on the runway of Lisa's faculty fashion show. Robert and Leung team up to find the vandal who has been defacing staff pictures.
28	3	"Donor Dinner"	Jacob Tierney	Gerry Dee	March 10, 2014	N/A
When Gerry finds out that Robert is trying to charm Xavier Academy's most-generous philanthropist into continuing her support, Gerry decides he's going to show up Robert and take all the recognition for himself.
29	4	"Assistant Leung"	Steve Wright	Mark Forward	March 17, 2014	N/A
Gerry is forced to appoint his arch nemesis Mr. Leung as his new assistant coach. His attempts to put Leung in his place as his subordinate end up backfiring and causing unforeseen problems. Robert's beloved pet bird quickly becomes a major nuisance when he starts bringing it to work.
30	5	"Food Drive"	Steve Wright	Gerry Dee	March 24, 2014	N/A
It's Food Drive Month at Xavier Academy, and Gerry is determined to make sure he wins the prize for being the teacher with the class that contributes the most food. Robert and Bobbi are put at odds when the field hockey team and debate team are both counting on their star, Sheila, to attend practice at the same time.
31	6	"Gerry Gets Gym"	Steve Wright	Gerry Dee	March 31, 2014	N/A
When Gerry is asked to temporarily fill in for an absent phys-ed teacher, he aggressively pursues what he sees as an "audition" to make a permanent move into the gymnasium.
32	7	"Self Defence"	Jacob Tierney	Andrew De Angelis and Jessie Gabe	April 7, 2014	N/A
Gerry decides to "help" Bobbi with her girls' self-defence class, but feels emasculated when she physically dominates him. Lisa's lunch causes an uproar in the teachers' lounge, while Leung has mysterious packages delivered to reception. Guest Appearance: Nathan MacKinnon and Cameron Critchlow as themselves
33	8	"Graduation"	Keith Samples	Gerry Dee and Mike Volpe	April 14, 2014	N/A
After Gerry has a positive interview for Xavier's main rival school, he attempts to use it as leverage with Principal Callaghan for the phys-ed position. When Callaghan encourages Robert to take a bigger leadership role, Robert decides an elaborate musical number will show everybody that he has what it takes.

=== Season 4 (2015) ===
No. overall	No. in season	Title	Directed by	Written by	Original release date	Canadian viewers (millions)
34	1	"Mafia Dad"	Keith Samples	Gerry Dee	January 20, 2015	N/A
Gerry has the chance to coach the varsity boys basketball team but ends up in an awkward position when an overeager gift-bearing dad insists that a reluctant Gerry should let his son play.
35	2	"Staff Hangover"	Jacob Tierney	Jessie Gabe	January 27, 2015	N/A
During a school assembly, Xavier teachers have flashbacks of the previous night's staff party where some members let a little too much loose. Xavier's new Librarian has an unusual name.
36	3	"President Jimmy"	Stephen Reynolds	Gerry Dee	February 3, 2015	0.457
Gerry becomes unexpectedly embroiled in the school's student-council election and is forced to seek the help of an old foe. Guest star: Roberto Alomar as himself
37	4	"Callaghan's Daughter"	Keith Samples	Gerry Dee	February 10, 2015	N/A
Callaghan's daughter is in town visiting; after seeing her old graduation photo, Gerry wants to take her out on a date.
38	5	"Dating Maya Student"	Steve Wright	Gerry Dee	February 17, 2015	N/A
Gerry's former pupil, Maya, is back at Xavier as a student teacher and Gerry is having difficulty accepting her as an adult.
39	6	"Short Stocked"	Steve Wright	Gerry Dee	February 24, 2015	N/A
Gerry and Bill's rental house is up for sale and Gerry uses the advice of a market-savvy student raise enough money for a down payment.
40	7	"Corporal Punishment"	Keith Samples	Gerry Dee	March 3, 2015	0.519
Gerry's father visits Xavier, and Gerry decides to take a page from his father's book when dealing with an insubordinate student.
41	8	"Lockdown"	Jacob Tierney	Gerry Dee	March 10, 2015	N/A
After encountering an attractive police officer during a lock-down drill, Gerry is determined to see her again. Bobbi does her best to end her recurring fling with Robert, while Simon shows Frank how he could use science to protect Xavier.
42	9	"Gerry's Kid"	Steve Wright	Gerry Dee	March 17, 2015	N/A
Gerry bumps into an old fling and her daughter and becomes convinced he's met the child he never knew he had. Robert prepares for his chess club's 20-year reunion. Guest star: Jenna Caira as herself
43	10	"Teacher Conference"	Jacob Tierney	Gerry Dee	March 24, 2015	N/A
Gerry meets an attractive woman at Barrel's and drags Lisa with him to a teacher conference in Atlantic City to find her.
44	11	"Coaching Prospects"	Keith Samples	Gerry Dee	March 31, 2015	N/A
Gerry's star player is being scouted by Syracuse University, and Gerry wants to come along as part of a package deal. Guest Appearance: Nathan MacKinnon and Cameron Critchlow as themselves
45	12	"Bizzaro"	Steve Wright	Gerry Dee	April 7, 2015	N/A
Something very strange is happening at Xavier Academy: the day-to-day goings on of Gerry and the rest of the staff have been completely reversed.
46	13	"Coach of the Year"	Jacob Tierney	Gerry Dee	April 14, 2015	N/A
Gerry figures he's a sure thing for the school's Coach of the Year award after his team wins the city championship.

=== Season 5 (2016) ===
No. overall	No. in season	Title	Directed by	Written by	Original release date	Canadian viewers (millions)
47	1	"Gerry's Redemption"	Keith Samples	Gerry Dee	January 19, 2016	N/A
After losing his Xavier Academy job last season over the unfortunate Coach Keenan saga, Gerry finds himself subbing at a tough inner-city school.
48	2	"Educational Assistant"	Keith Samples	Gerry Dee	January 26, 2016	0.396
Gerry is assigned an educational assistant, Marty, who quickly becomes a new source of irritation in the classroom.
49	3	"Wrestling for Love"	Keith Samples	Jessie Gabe	February 2, 2016	N/A
When Lisa asks Gerry to cover coaching duties for the upcoming wrestling tournament, Gerry promises to bring home two trophies. But when an unexpected ringworm outbreak threatens the team's success, he concocts an elaborate ruse to avoid certain disqualification.
50	4	"Gerry Runs a Sweatshop"	Jacob Tierney	Gerry Dee	February 9, 2016	N/A
Gerry hatches a new "get rich quick" scheme selling counterfeit One Direction merchandise when he learns the band is in town. But making countless beaded bracelets at home is tedious work, and Gerry soon realizes he has a whole classroom full of potential unpaid labourers waiting to be exploited.
51	5	"Re-Tired of Marking"	Keith Samples	Dane Clark	February 16, 2016	N/A
When Gerry is suddenly promoted from sub to full-time teacher, his initial thrill is quickly squashed by the realization that he's back to real teaching responsibilities.
52	6	"Duncan vs. Bailey"	Steve Wright	Graham Chittenden, Shebli Zarghami	February 23, 2016	N/A
When Gerry learns that former Olympic champion Donovan Bailey is coming to town, he's determined to seek retribution for a long-standing bone he has with the track "star". Guest star: Donovan Bailey as himself
53	7	"Student Teacher"	Jason Shipley	Dane Clark	March 1, 2016	N/A
When Gerry and Simon get student teachers, Gerry's hands-off approach fails; Bobbi starts taking supplements; Emma's characters bear a resemblance to some of the staff.
54	8	"Gerry Wants a Union"	Gerry Dee	Dane Clark	March 8, 2016	N/A
Gerry decides to form a teachers union at Xavier; Malik bails on his janitorial duties; Lisa has a crush on Trudy's brother.
55	9	"Duncan Does Detention"	Jacob Tierney	Dane Clark	March 15, 2016	N/A
Gerry is forced into covering Saturday detention; Robert and Lisa have a heart to heart.
56	10	"Gerry Coaches Fencing"	Steve Wright	Dane Clark	March 22, 2016	N/A
Gerry is assigned to help Ricki prepare for a fencing tournament; Bobbi invites Dwyer over for dinner in an attempt to seduce him.
57	11	"Hell-icopter Mom"	Stephen Reynolds	Dane Clark, Jessie Gabe	March 29, 2016	N/A
Gerry is confronted by his overprotective and obnoxious mother; Bobbi tries to pawn off the role of staff punching bag; Ricki sells pencils to Robert.
58	12	"Out Cold"	Michael Volpe	Dane Clark	April 5, 2016	N/A
Gerry meets a beautiful woman while on a leadership retreat; Lisa learns of Trudy's gambling ring; Simon and Frank's game takes an ugly turn.
59	13	"Gerry Turns 40"	Stephen Reynolds	Jessie Gabe	April 12, 2016	N/A
Upon his 40th birthday, Gerry finds a letter he wrote to himself 10 years ago; Simon's ferret goes missing; Lisa tries to impress the chairman of the board of trustees.

=== Season 6 (2016) ===
No. overall	No. in season	Title	Directed by	Written by	Original release date	Canadian viewers (millions)
60	1	"Gerry Does It Again"	Keith Samples	Jessie Gabe	October 18, 2016	N/A
Gerry and Lisa attempt to navigate their new reality as a married couple. Meanwhile, Emma's library receives a shipment of e-readers and Nisha attempts to have a pleasant dinner with Simon and his mom.
61	2	"Gerry Wants to Stay Married"	Steve Wright	Jessie Gabe	October 25, 2016	N/A
Lisa has second thoughts about the marriage, but Gerry isn't throwing in the towel so quickly. Meanwhile, Robert gives a new treadmill desk a try; and Bobbi is aglow after being called an "inspiration" by a former student.
62	3	"Gerry Gets a Kid"	Steve Wright	Dane Clark	November 1, 2016	N/A
With Hayden's wealthy father on his deathbed and preparing to bequeath Hayden's favourite staff, Gerry attempts to ingratiate himself to the young student. Meanwhile, Lisa and Robert are named co-principals, shifting the balance of power; and Nisha ruins an innocent children's game.
63	4	"Gerry Goes to Prison"	Steve Wright	Gerry Dee	November 15, 2016	N/A
Gerry, Simon and Nisha take on various teaching side jobs in an effort to save for their respective March break getaways.
64	5	"A Star is Born"	Keith Samples	Shebli Zarghami	November 22, 2016	N/A
Gerry steps into the role of a lifetime and finds himself bitten by the acting bug and reveling in the new-found attention. Bobbi tries a new tactic in order to motivate her lethargic students and Nisha discovers a manipulative teaching technique.
65	6	"Gerry Throws the Game"	Gerry Dee	Gerry Dee	November 29, 2016	N/A
Gerry takes on the senior girls' volleyball team. But when he realizes their semifinals will be interfering with his all-important social schedule, he sets out to sabotage them at the quarterfinals. Meanwhile, Robert needs to increase the 'between class hustle' and Trudy posts a terrible photo on the allergy wall.
66	7	"The Man with Two Red Shoes"	Michael Volpe	Gerry Dee	December 6, 2016	N/A
When Gerry learns of a lurker in the vicinity, he sets out to catch said lurker and earn the Teach of the Month title. Meanwhile, Robert creates a Xavier Academy montage, from which Bobbi is conspicuously lacking, and a new feud develops between Dwyer and Nisha.
67	8	"Gerry Has Hot Sub Anxiety"	Keith Samples	Gerry Dee, Michael Volpe	December 13, 2016	N/A
Gerry is blown away by the hotness of the new subs and sets his sights on Mary, the likely love of his life. Meanwhile, Simon and Nisha ready themselves for their big first kiss, and Bobbi attempts a "kill 'em with kindness" method for dealing with a difficult student.
68	9	"Busploitation"	Derek Filiatrault	Gerry Dee, Michael Volpe	December 20, 2016	N/A
When Gerry hears that a Kickstarter campaign raised a bundle of money for a bullied bus monitor, he sets out to victimize himself in a similar fashion. Meanwhile, Dwyer has a new "killer" girlfriend and Bobbi comes to a surprising realization.
69	10	"Gerry Charters a New Course"	Jason Shipley	Gerry Dee, Michael Volpe	December 27, 2016	N/A
When Gerry isn't given a full-time contract for the following year, he makes a bold move that may change the course of his career. Meanwhile, Lisa attempts in vain to show her appreciation to the staff, and Robert and Bobbi plan for a major shift in the physical education department. Guest Star: Hal Johnson and Joanne McLeod as themselves

=== Season 7 (2017) ===
No. overall	No. in season	Title	Directed by	Written by	Original release date	Canadian viewers (millions)
70	1	"Gerry Wants to Make Phys Ed Great Again"	Gerry Dee	Jessie Gabe	September 26, 2017	N/A
After finally achieving his goal of teaching physical education full time, Gerry sets out to teach the course the way it should be taught.
71	2	"Gerry Rigs PTA"	Keith Samples	Dane Clark	October 3, 2017	N/A
Lisa runs for the unopposed Parent-Teacher Association president position as a way to punish the staff.
72	3	"Gerry Cuts a Footloose"	Keith Samples	Gerry Dee	October 10, 2017	N/A
When Gerry meets a DJ at the gym, he offers her a job at the school dance, but Robert has banned dances and won't budge on his position.
73	4	"Gerry Coaches Hockey"	Steve Wright	Gerry Dee	October 17, 2017	N/A
Gerry suspects Central High of cheating; Bobbi prepares for maternity leave.
74	5	"Formative Bulls..."	Keith Samples	Gerry Dee	October 24, 2017	N/A
Gerry discovers that teaching phys ed comes up a lot of paperwork; Bobbi tries to juggle work and a newborn; Lisa becomes friends with some moms who may have dirt on Xavier.
75	6	"Gerry Pay to Play"	Rob Cotterill	Shebli Zarghami	October 31, 2017	N/A
Gerry is in a compromising situation after the teacher auction; Emma enlists Dwyer to do repairs in the library; Trudy gets a surprise visit. Guest stars: Alan Frew as Tim King & Heather Rankin as Jen Lewis
76	7	"Work to Rule"	Steve Wright	Michael Volpe	November 7, 2017	N/A
Gerry is in awe of the concept of work-to-rule; Lisa tries setting boundaries with her stepson; Nisha accidentally reveals too much to her students.
77	8	"Gerry Wants What He Can't Trans"	Jessie Gabe	Linsey Stewart	November 14, 2017	N/A
Gerry takes control of the girls' soccer team to get back at Coach Meyers; an ambitious mom seduces Frank; Lisa's reign of terror seemingly comes to an end.
78	9	"Principal for a Day"	Steve Wright	Gerry Dee	November 21, 2017	N/A
Gerry's least-favorite student becomes Principal for a Day; a harmless prank goes sour; Bobbi accidentally ruins a student's life.
79	10	"Gerry's Security Insecurity"	Jason Shipley	Jason Packer, Gerry Dee	November 28, 2017	N/A
Robert hires a security guard after a string of thefts; Robert learns the truth behind his baby's name.
80	11	"Gerry's Insider's Look"	Michael Volpe	Jessie Gabe	December 5, 2017	N/A
A team of reporters uses Xavier Academy to determine the true value of private schools and ends up exposing a deep, dark secret.

=== Season 8 (2018) ===
No. overall	No. in season	Title	Directed by	Written by	Original release date	Canadian viewers (millions)
81	1	"Big in Japan"	Gerry Dee	Gerry Dee	November 1, 2018	N/A
Continuing from the previous season finale, the "Insider's Look" exposé on Gerry costs him his job and makes it impossible to get a new one, so he has no choice but to get as far away as he can to start a new life in Japan, leaving Xavier behind. However, after the Board of Directors want to do damage control and make the "Insider's Look" look like "fake news", Robert must bring Gerry back from Japan or risk being fired from the Board. Meanwhile, after Emma claims she was once a gymnast destined for the Olympics 20 years ago, Lisa goes out of her way to prove Emma is lying.
82	2	"Finnished Teaching"	Steve Wright	Gerry Dee	November 8, 2018	N/A
When Gerry's officially introduced as Xavier's new principal, the staff's obvious disappointment leads Gerry to try and gain their trust by making some drastic moves he thinks everyone can appreciate. However, his proposal to adopt the Finnished School System proves to be challenging to Gerry's work life balance. After Nisha is scolded for not being able to play with a student's emotional support dog, she gets one of her own that causes problems at Xavier. After Barrels declares bankruptcy, Bill proposes to Robert to start a smoothie bar at Xavier.
83	3	"Breaking Slime"	Marsh Horodyski	Shebli Zarghami	November 15, 2018	N/A
Slime is all the rage across Xavier, leading Gerry to ban it. Gerry also learns, however, that slime is actually a pretty lucrative business... and his ban just created a vacuum, which prompts him to recruit Simon, Amanda-Susan and the primary students into his enterprise. After becoming co-vice principals, Dwyer and Robert have a lottery to determine what students they will be responsible to deal with. Lisa gets a blonde dye job and Bobbi cannot explain why she finds herself suddenly attracted to Lisa.
84	4	"Mister D"	Gerry Dee	Dane Clark	November 22, 2018	N/A
Gerry is approached by a producer who wants to use Xavier as a backdrop for a movie, but he gets too caught up in the details to see the big picture: they're filming a porn at Xavier. Lisa becomes jealous that Lucy is taking Bill's career advice at the Smoothie Bar, which prompts her to try and provide better advice as the Guidance Counsellor. After Emma takes Nisha to a magic show, Emma then expects repayment for the tickets that she actually received for free.
85	5	"Security Threat"	Michael Volpe	Jason Packer & Shebli Zarghami	November 29, 2018	N/A
After a near life-and-death experience, Gerry doesn't believe the staff care if he's in mortal peril, so he stages a threat against him prompting Robert to rehire Ron as his security guard. Nisha once again intervenes in advice to Dwyer to break up with Donna, which Nisha fears that her life is in danger when Donna breaks out of prison and comes for Nisha. Frank starts to irritate Dave, the Economics Teacher. Guest appearances: Tessa Virtue and Scott Moir as themselves.
86	6	"The Dwyer Way"	Linsey Stewart	Linsey Stewart	December 5, 2018	N/A
When Gerry realizes how poorly he's been taking care of himself, he adopts Dwyer's strict diet. Diets require the kind of discipline Gerry lacks. Nisha tries recruiting Lisa, Bobbi and Emma to go to an Escape Room on Friday night, but when Lisa, Bobbi and Emma rescind their plans, Nisha makes all stops to get out of going to the Escape Room when it's only Frank and the lesser known staff members who are eager to go. Robert tells Trudy that staff believe she's mean, so he needs her to turnaround if she wants a raise on her performance review, so Trudy becomes so nice, it starts to creep out the rest of Xavier's staff.
87	7	"Wedding Story"	Keith Samples	Michael Volpe	December 12, 2018	N/A
Bobbi and Robert's wedding day is approaching, which Gerry looks into online dating for his plus 1. Bill gives Gerry advice to go online and find a date. After speaking to Trudy, Gerry checks his spam mail and reaches out a Klaudia from Poland. After she flies to meet Gerry, he learns Frank can speak Polish, so unknown to Gerry, Bill is trying to woo Klaudia. Nisha is depressed that Simon hasn't proposed, so she takes advice seeing Bobbi proposed to Robert, so she asks Simon's mom for her blessing to marry Simon. Nisha finds out that Simon's mom ran off with him, which Simon attempts to reach out to her leaving it unknown whether they tied the not over an iPad. In the end, Frank and Klaudia run off and steal Gerry's RV to ride off to the sunset. Bill reveals to Gerry he's made business deals to open smoothie bars in private schools across the country and hugs Gerry for the last time before leaving the series.
88	8	"Parting Gift"	Keith Samples	Gerry Dee	December 19, 2018	N/A
Nisha, depressed that another year is ending, tries to find methods to transform her emotional pain letting go her emotional attachment with students all year before the summer break and the departing graduate class. Lisa, feeling dejected with being an overqualified guidance counselor at Xavier, agrees to accompany Brandon to the university where she graduated to help him cope with his anxiety. Gerry is challenged by the graduating class, who he started teaching in the series premiere, to provide them a parting gift that they’ll remember him by. In the end, Gerry attempts to break the record for the world's largest time capsule in the form of a dumpster, with the idea that the graduating class would toss their belongings inside and revisit the time capsule in the future. While burying the dumpster, the students discover human bones in the ground, prompting an indefinite shutdown of Xavier Academy. With the school now closed indefinitely, the remaining staff realize their fates: Simon returns revealing he's on the run from his mother and takes off with Nisha into the sunset; Robert is rich and realizes he doesn’t really need the job, and walks off with Bobbi set for life; Dwyer confesses that despite Donna's anger issues, he is already planning to move closer to the prison where she's incarcerated; Lisa boasts about her new job, as well as her new cat-loving colleague; Emma reveals she's crowning and has been in labour for seven hours, prompting Lisa to take her to the hospital; Trudy is bored with everything and walks off gladly; Malik plans to finally meet his long-lost sister in Des Moines and hugs Gerry goodbye; Gerry walks off trying to figure out what he’ll do next.

== Reception ==
The first episode of the show was watched by 1.23 million viewers, which was the biggest midseason debut for the CBC 2011–12 season.

=== Awards and nominations ===
Year	Award	Category	Winner/nominee	Result
2013	ACTRA Awards	ACTRA Award for Outstanding Performance - Female	Naomi Snieckus	Nominated
2015	ACTRA Awards	Outstanding Male Actor in a Supporting Role	Jonathan Torrens	Won
2015	ACTRA Awards	Outstanding Female Actor in a Supporting Role	Bette MacDonald	Nominated
2014	Banff Rockie Awards	Bell Media National Fellowship Award of Distinction	Jessie Gabe	Won
2012	Canadian Comedy Awards	Best Performance by a Male - Television	Darrin Rose	Nominated
2012	Canadian Comedy Awards	Best Performance by a Female - Television	Naomi Snieckus	Nominated
2013	Canadian Comedy Awards	Best Performance by a Female - Television	Naomi Snieckus	Won
2013	Canadian Comedy Awards	Best TV Show	Mr. D	Won
2013	Canadian Screen Awards	Best Performance by an Actor in a Continuing Leading Comedic Role	Gerry Dee	Won
2013	Canadian Screen Awards	Best Comedy Program or Series	Mr. D	Nominated
2014	Canadian Screen Awards	Best Comedy Program or Series	Mr. D	Nominated
2015	Canadian Screen Awards	Best Comedy Program or Series	Mr. D	Nominated
2015	Canadian Screen Awards	Best Performance by an Actress in a Featured Supporting Role or Guest Role in a Comedic Series	Naomi Snieckus	Nominated
2015	Canadian Screen Awards	Best Performance by an Actress in a Featured Supporting Role or Guest Role in a Comedic Series	Lauren Hammersley	Nominated
2015	Canadian Screen Awards	Best Performance by an Actor in a Featured Supporting Role or Guest Role in a Comedic Series	Jonathan Torrens	Won
2015	Canadian Screen Awards	Best Performance by an Actor in a Continuing Leading Comedic Role	Gerry Dee	Nominated
2015	Canadian Screen Awards	Best Direction in a Comedy Program or Series	Steve Wright	Nominated
2015	Canadian Screen Awards	Best Achievement in Casting	Tina Gerussi & Sheila Lane	Nominated
2015	Canadian Screen Awards	Best Writing in a Comedy Program or Series	Gerry Dee	Nominated
2015	Canadian Screen Awards	Best Writing in a Comedy Program or Series	Jessie Gabe	Nominated
2015	Canadian Screen Awards	Best Picture Editing in a Comedy or Variety Program or Series	Patricia Brown & Dean Soltys	Nominated
2015	Canadian Screen Awards	Best Performance by an Actress in a Featured Supporting Role or Guest Role in a Comedic Series	Bette MacDonald	Nominated
2016	Canadian Screen Awards	Best Performance by an Actor in a Featured Supporting Role or Guest Role in a Comedic Series	Darrin Rose	Nominated
2017	Canadian Screen Awards	Best Comedy Series	Michael Volpe, Gerry Dee	Nominated
2017	Canadian Screen Awards	Best Performance by an Actor in a Continuing Leading Comedic Role	Gerry Dee	Nominated
2017	Canadian Screen Awards	Best Performance by an Actor in a Featured Supporting Role or Guest Role in a Comedic Series	Jonathan Torrens	Nominated
2017	Canadian Screen Awards	Best Performance by an Actress in a Featured Supporting Role or Guest Role in a Comedic Series	Naomi Snieckus	Nominated
2017	Canadian Screen Awards	Best Performance by an Actress in a Featured Supporting Role or Guest Role in a Comedic Series	Kathleen Phillips	Nominated
2017	Canadian Screen Awards	Best Photography in a Comedy Program or Series	Ian Bibby	Nominated
2017	Young Artist Awards	Best Performance in a TV Series - Recurring Teen Actor	Jordan Poole	Nominated
2017	Young Artist Awards	Best Performance in a TV Series -Supporting Young Actress	Alyce Donoghue	Nominated
2017	Young Artist Awards	Best Performance in a TV Series -Supporting Young Actress	Faith Donoghue	Nominated

== Proposed U.S. version ==
On October 31, 2015, Gerry Dee and Mr. D co-creator Michael Volpe announced an agreement had been signed with Will Arnett's newly formed TV production company, Electric Avenue, to develop an American version of the show for American network CBS.

Dee revealed the initial contact with Will Arnett came from a friend of a friend who went to school with Arnett. He stated that there had been small interest from American television in the past, but this was the first serious proposal to get an American version of the show up.

Dee and Volpe originally pitched the show as an American reboot with Dee reprising his role. However, CBS was looking to use the show as a vehicle for an American star with Dee and Volpe getting executive producer credits. Veteran comedic actor Tom Arnold had been signed to the title role. CBS also mentioned hiring Tom Hertz as showrunner. Hertz was previously executive producer of popular American sitcoms Spin City and The King of Queens.

While Dee understands a show about his life as a teacher before he became a comedian will be adapted to suit American audiences, with changes including a multi-camera American sitcom system rather than the single camera Canadian system, he hopes the American version will retain Mr. D's mix of character humour, physical comedy and authenticity, along with its use of talented young actors for students instead of 25-year-olds playing teenagers.
