= Rookie Blue season 5 =

Rookie Blue
- Season 5
- DVD cover as Season 5, Volume One
- No. of episodes: 11

Release
- Original network: Global
- Original release: May 19 – August 6, 2014

Season chronology
- ← Previous; Season 4 Next → Season 6

The fifth season of Rookie Blue premiered on May 19, 2014, on Global. This season was originally going to be the first part of this season before it was announced that the first half have been rebranded as a single season.

== Production ==
On July 17, 2013, ABC and Global announced that Rookie Blue was renewed for a fifth season, with production starting in January 2014.

On March 24, 2014, ABC and ET Canada announced that season 5 of Rookie Blue would start on July 17 and that ABC and Global would be airing half the episodes this summer and the rest "at a later date". ABC premiered the season on June 19, 2014, whilst Global announced the season premiere was set for May 19, a month ahead of its American counterpart. On August 7, 2014, creator Tassie Cameron announced, that the second half of season five would now be season 6 and air in 2015.

Season 5 introduced Oliver Becker as Inspector John Jarvis and Matt Murray as Rookie Duncan Moore. Lyriq Bent and Rachael Ancheril both returned for single-episode guest appearances following their departure from the main cast at the end of season 4, whilst Adam MacDonald was promoted to series regular.

== Cast ==
=== Main ===
- Missy Peregrym as Officer Andy McNally
- Gregory Smith as Officer Dov Epstein
- Charlotte Sullivan as Officer Gail Peck
- Enuka Okuma as Detective Traci Nash
- Travis Milne as Officer Chris Diaz
- Peter Mooney as Officer Nick Collins
- Priscilla Faia as Officer Chloe Price
- Adam MacDonald as Detective Steve Peck
- Matt Gordon as Sergeant Oliver Shaw
- Ben Bass as Detective Sam Swarek

=== Recurring ===
- Lyriq Bent as Sergeant Frank Best
- Aliyah O'Brien as Dr. Holly Stewart
- Erin Karpluk as Officer Juliette Ward
- Rachael Ancheril as Detective Marlo Cruz

== Episodes ==
No. overall	No. in season	Title	Directed by	Written by	Original release date	Canadian viewers (millions)
53	1	"Blink"	David Wellington	Tassie Cameron	May 19, 2014	1.859
With Sam in surgery and Chloe in critical care, Andy and Dov head to an all-night diner to take a break from the night's traumatic events. Their desire to regroup and “not be cops tonight” is thwarted when two violent and agitated 20-somethings hold up the diner. Meanwhile, the other officers of 15 Division struggle to contain the collateral damage from the evening’s chaos – under the watchful eye of tough new Inspector, John Jarvis.
54	2	"All By Her Selfie"	David Wellington	Sherry White	May 26, 2014	1.570
In the wake of Frank's dismissal, Inspector Jarvis promotes a reluctant Oliver to Acting Staff Sergeant. Meanwhile, Andy takes on the challenge of training 15 Division's new rookie, Duncan Moore (step-son of the Police Commissioner), and soon discovers that being a training officer - especially to this rookie - is no easy job.
55	3	"Heart Breakers, Money Makers"	Gregory Smith	Noelle Carbone	June 2, 2014	1.741
In the hours before Fite Nite, the officers of 15 Division are assigned to seize items purchased with money earned illegally – a task no one is excited about. Andy and Nick are sent to an illegal gambling house and dutifully arrest the homeowner. Sam returns to duty and is roped in to help Andy with a case which seems too good to be true. Dov and Gail emerge empty-handed, until they go off-book following a lead. Meanwhile, Duncan prepares to compete in the rookie match-up and Chris stresses out over logistics.
56	4	"Wanting"	Peter Wellington	Russ Cochrane	June 9, 2014	1.664
Andy struggles with getting through to Duncan, but refuses to give up on him. When a shooting in an apartment building leads to the discovery of an executed gang leader, it’s all hands on deck as 15 Division work to prevent a gang war. Andy and Duncan speak with a child who may know more than he is saying, and later, in a life-and-death moment, Andy may regret giving her rookie so many chances. Meanwhile, Gail follows up on another victim of the shootings, a woman that took a stray bullet, only to make a discovery that will shake her to her core.
57	5	"Going Under"	T.W. Peacocke	John Krizanc	June 16, 2014	1.602
When 15 Division goes undercover at a bar that’s a possible hub for illegal handguns, Chris' erratic behaviour and concern for a specific drug dealer make Dov suspicious. Meanwhile, after learning Duncan has made serious professional allegations against her, Andy decides to help Sam with a missing person’s case that takes a dark turn.
58	6	"Two Truths and a Lie"	Peter Wellington	Adriana Maggs	June 23, 2014	1.592
As the officers of 15 Division try to hunt down the killer of Brian Gowdy, Andy and Sam go on the road to interview a list of inmates at Millburn Penitentiary. All are known associates of the prime suspect; one person on that list happens to be none other than Jay Swarek, Sam's father.
59	7	"Deal with the Devil"	David Wellington	Noelle Carbone	July 9, 2014	1.585
In the midst of a chaotic day at the station, Oliver prepares Andy to defend herself at Duncan’s dismissal hearing. When Duncan produces new evidence that shifts all the blame to Andy, Oliver must decide if he’s willing to compromise his professional integrity, and his friendship with Andy, to save her career.
60	8	"Exit Strategy"	Jeff Woolnough	Matt MacLennan	July 16, 2014	1.498
While 15 Division investigates a suspicious home invasion, Chris's addiction problems come to a head. Meanwhile, Tracy inadvertently ruins a raid, led by Steve, by telling Dex about it.
61	9	"Moving Day"	Teresa Hannigan	Katrina Saville	July 23, 2014	1.677
The officers help tenants move from a condemned subsidized-housing complex into a neighboring building, where Andy and Chloe find a man who has been tortured and beaten unconscious. They uncover a ruthless criminal operation in the process. Meanwhile, Nick and Gail arrest teenage siblings whose secrets cause Nick to divulge some of his own.
62	10	"Fragments"	John Fawcett	Russ Cochrane	July 30, 2014	1.258
Andy's anxiety about her relationship with Sam comes to fruition when Duncan returns to active duty, hoping to reconcile. A car bomb explosion in a downtown parking garage is quickly followed by a second one at a busy local intersection. An eager Duncan goes rogue, only to come face-to-face with the car-bomber. Andy and Nick must get the situation under control and save Duncan before time runs out.
63	11	"Everlasting"	David Wellington	Sherry White	August 6, 2014	1.523
With the car-bomber still on the loose, the division is frantic to track down the suspect and to figure out if more bombs have been planted around the city. When none are found, one goes off in the evidence room of the station, with Andy inside. While that was going on, the bomber killed himself.

== U.S. Nielsen ratings ==
The following is a table for the United States ratings, based on average total estimated viewers per episode, of Rookie Blue on ABC.

Season 5 (ABC)
#	#	Title	U.S. air date	Rating/share (18-49)	Viewers (millions)
53	1	"Blink"	June 19, 2014	1.1/4	5.92
54	2	"All By Her Selfie"	June 19, 2014	1.1/4	5.92
55	3	"Heart Breakers, Money Makers"	June 26, 2014	0.9/3	5.12
56	4	"Wanting"	July 3, 2014	0.8/3	5.24
57	5	"Going Under"	July 10, 2014	0.9/3	5.13
58	6	"Two Truths and a Lie"	July 17, 2014	0.9/3	5.43
59	7	"Deal with the Devil"	July 31, 2014	1.0/3	4.79
60	8	"Exit Strategy"	August 7, 2014	0.8/2	4.59
61	9	"Moving Day"	August 14, 2014	0.9/3	4.58
62	10	"Fragments"	August 21, 2014	1.0/3	5.31
63	11	"Everlasting"	August 21, 2014	1.0/3	5.31
