= Rookie Blue season 4 =

Rookie Blue
- Season 4
- Region 1 DVD cover art
- No. of episodes: 13

Release
- Original network: Global
- Original release: May 23 – September 12, 2013

Season chronology
- ← Previous; Season 3 Next → Season 5

The fourth season of the Canadian police drama Rookie Blue starring Missy Peregrym, Ben Bass and Gregory Smith premiered on May 23, 2013, on Global in Canada.

== Production ==
On June 26, 2012, ABC and Global announced that the show was renewed once again for a fourth season just three episodes into its previous season. On March 21, 2013, ABC and Global announced the season premiere would be May 23, 2013.

Priscilla Faia and Rachael Ancheril joined the main cast, whilst former main cast member Melanie Nicholls-King returned as a recurring guest star. Adam MacDonald and Eric Johnson continued to recur, whilst Aliyah O'Brien joined the guest cast as Holly Stewart. This was the first season not to feature Noam Jenkins, and the last to feature Lyriq Bent amongst the main cast.

== Cast ==
=== Main cast ===
- Missy Peregrym as Officer Andy McNally
- Gregory Smith as Officer Dov Epstein
- Enuka Okuma as Detective Traci Nash
- Travis Milne as Officer Chris Diaz
- Charlotte Sullivan as Officer Gail Peck
- Peter Mooney as Officer Nick Collins
- Matt Gordon as Officer Oliver Shaw
- Lyriq Bent as Sergeant Frank Best
- Priscilla Faia as Officer Chloe Price
- Rachael Ancheril as Officer Marlo Cruz
- Ben Bass as Detective Sam Swarek

=== Recurring ===
- Eric Johnson as Detective Luke Callaghan
- Melanie Nicholls-King as Officer Noelle Williams
- Aliyah O'Brien as Dr. Holly Stewart

== Episodes ==
No. overall	No. in season	Title	Directed by	Written by	Original release date	Canadian viewers (millions)
40	1	"Surprises"	David Wellington	Tassie Cameron	May 23, 2013	1.157
Andy and Nick return from their undercover mission to find everyone has kept going, both personally and professionally. The biggest surprise for Andy is that Sam has now been promoted to detective and has a new love interest.
41	2	"Homecoming"	David Wellington	Russ Cochrane	May 30, 2013	1.181
It's the first day back on the job for Andy and Nick as they adjust back to their old lives. Andy ends up working with Sam and tries to put the past behind her as they deal with a bank robbery. Nick tries to get back in Gail's good graces and gets some advice from a citizen he helps. Meanwhile, Frank has a surprise for Noelle.
42	3	"Different, Not Better"	Lynne Stopkewich	Sherry White	June 27, 2013	1.042
Andy has to learn to work with a new partner, Officer Marlo Cruz, who also happens to be Sam's new girlfriend. This causes tension between the two women as they are dealing with an emotionally unstable woman. Meanwhile, Dov discovers his one night stand is actually a fellow police officer—a new transfer and Frank's goddaughter, Chloe Price—who he ends up working with when 15 Division has to deal with chasing down a burglar with a unique MO.: This episode marks the debut appearance of Priscilla Faia as Officer Chloe Price.
43	4	"The Kids Are Not Alright"	Peter Wellington	Noelle Carbone	July 11, 2013	1.278
Andy and Gail come across a teenage boy tied up and locked in a trunk in a routine highway search. They must deal with a young-love-gone-wrong situation. Swarek, Oliver and Chris track a gunman who shot a sixteen-year-old boy and who might have gang connections and Swarek has to convince him that revenge isn't the answer. Chloe makes an observation that may change the dynamic among the rookies.
44	5	"Poison Pill"	Peter Wellington	Aubrey Nealon	July 18, 2013	1.226
Andy and Marlo have an out of control drug arrest, which leads to the discovery of a deadly bacteria in the drugs, which turns into a city wide outbreak, which Sam tries to control. The two ladies are stuck in a decontamination process and quarantine, when Marlo reveals a big secret about herself. Dov and Chloe's new romance is off to a rocky start when Dov thinks she's hiding something.
45	6	"Skeletons"	T.W. Peacocke	Ley Lukins	July 25, 2013	1.205
Detective Luke Callaghan returns to help with a possible copycat kidnapping, one that brings back bad memories of Jerry's death for, Sam, Gail and Traci. Sam and Andy end up working together, finally admitting to each other the real reason for their break up. Recurring stars: Eric Johnson as Detective Luke Callaghan and Adam MacDonald as Detective Steve Peck
46	7	"Friday the 13th"	David Wellington	Sherry White	August 1, 2013	1.336
When human bones are discovered in a ravine related to a fifteen-year-old case, Sam teams up with his old training officer, Charlie Walsh (Al Sapienza), to solve the crime, only to realize that Charlie's personal life isn't what it seems and makes Sam rethink his career. Dov and Chloe have to deal with a witch and argue over the best course of action, which also involves her unhappy client.
47	8	"For Better, for Worse"	Kelly Makin	Tassie Cameron	August 8, 2013	1.244
Frank and Noelle's wedding has arrived and everyone at 15 Division is celebrating. Things don't go as planned, when a casino bus is robbed, the bride is missing, and Andy and Nick share an intimate moment. Recurring star: Adam MacDonald as Detective Steve Peck
48	9	"What I Lost"	Paul Fox	Noelle Carbone	August 15, 2013	1.192
Chris Diaz returns to the 15 Division and his son is kidnapped under Nick and Andy's care. While everyone is searching for baby Christian, Diaz discovers a secret that might tear his family apart for good and Sam finds out about Nick and Andy's new relationship.
49	10	"You Are Here"	Teresa Hannigan	Ley Lukins	August 22, 2013	1.165
Traci works her first homicide case with Detective Steve Peck, that originated as a routine marijuana bust, that has Andy, Nick and Gail, working overtime on the murder case. Recently separated Oliver has a new cabin and he invites Sam, Chris and Dov for a weekend of male bonding. Recurring star: Adam MacDonald as Detective Steve Peck
50	11	"Deception"	Kelly Makin	Aubrey Nealon	August 29, 2013	1.196
Kevin Ford, a pedophile, is found beaten up inside his house. Andy finds out that Marlo has been investigating him in her off time and has to help Sam cover up Marlo's actions, before she gets caught. Chloe, Nick, Dov and Gail help Traci with a drug sweep, which takes an unexpected twist, when Sam leaves them alone to help Andy and Marlo. Recurring stars: Eric Johnson as Detective Luke Callaghan and Adam MacDonald as Detective Steve Peck
51	12	"Under Fire"	Gregory Smith	Russ Cochrane	September 5, 2013	1.099
Andy and Chloe respond to a 911 call in a park, where they're ambushed and Chloe is shot. Gail and Oliver respond to a shots fired call, but it turns out to be another ambush. They realize then that someone is out for revenge against 15 Division. Dov finds out something about Chloe's past that will change their relationship. Oliver comes face to face with the shooter and has to make a life changing decision. Recurring stars: Eric Johnson as Detective Luke Callaghan and Adam MacDonald as Detective Steve Peck
52	13	"You Can See the Stars"	David Wellington	Tassie Cameron	September 12, 2013	1.323
The shooter keeps trying to get the people from 15 Division that are on his hit list and he abducts Oliver, putting the whole Division in danger while they try to find him. Marlo's secret gets out. Dov and Wes disagree on what is best for Chloe, each thinking they know better than the other. Recurring stars: Eric Johnson as Detective Luke Callaghan and Adam MacDonald as Detective Steve Peck

== U.S. Nielsen ratings ==
The following is a table for the United States ratings, based on average total estimated viewers per episode, of Rookie Blue on ABC.

Season 4 (ABC)
#	#	Title	U.S. air date	Rating	Share	Rating/share (18–49)	Viewers (millions)
40	1	"Surprises"	May 23, 2013	3.9	7.0	1.2/4	5.99
41	2	"Homecoming"	May 30, 2013	4.0	7.0	1.2/4	5.91
42	3	"Different, Not Better"	June 27, 2013	3.5	6.0	1.2/4	5.18
43	4	"The Kids Are Not Alright"	July 11, 2013	3.4	6.0	1.0/3	5.24
44	5	"Poison Pill"	July 18, 2013	3.4	6.0	1.1/3	5.24
45	6	"Skeletons	July 25, 2013	3.6	6.0	1.1/4	5.63
46	7	"Friday the 13th"	August 1, 2013	3.3	6.0	1.0/3	5.12
47	8	"For Better, for Worse"	August 8, 2013	3.1	5.0	0.9/3	4.50
48	9	"What I Lost	August 15, 2013	3.2	6.0	1.0/3	4.67
49	10	"You Are Here"	August 22, 2013	3.5	6.0	1.1/3	5.13
50	11	"Deception"	August 29, 2013	-	-	0.9/3	4.42
51	12	"Under Fire"	September 5, 2013	-	-	1.0/3	4.24
52	13	"You Can See The Stars"	September 12, 2013	-	-	1.0/3	4.71
