= List of Rookie Blue characters =

The following list is the list of characters from the Global TV police drama series Rookie Blue. Seven of whom being the protagonist.

== Rookies ==
=== Andy McNally ===
Andy McNally
- First appearance: "Fresh Paint" (episode 1.01)
- Portrayed by: Missy Peregrym

In-universe information
- Full name: Andrea Grace McNally
- Nickname: Andy
- Family: Tommy McNally (father); Claire McNally (mother); Harlow Jay Swarek (step-daughter)
- Spouse: Sam Swarek

Career
- Rank: Police Constable (training officer)
- Epaulette No.: 8722 / 616

Portrayed by Missy Peregrym

Andrea "Andy" McNally is one of the series seven protagonists, and the leading out of the other six. She is driven by the desire to do the right thing even if it means not following procedure. Her father, Tommy McNally, was formerly a homicide detective before he burned out. As a result, McNally carries her father's baggage, trying to prove herself. Her mother, Claire, is a social services worker who abandoned them when Andy was a teenager. She studied Sociology/Psychology before becoming a cop and she was an A student.

McNally was assigned to Oliver Shaw, who was mentored by her father when he was a rookie. Her first day begins disastrously; she was left to pursue two suspects on foot on her own as she had forgotten to turn her radio on and arrests them for drug possession, only to find out that one of them, Sam Swarek, was actually an undercover cop from her division and was two weeks away from a potential bust of a distribution ring – this was the premise for her love-hate relationship with him when he was assigned as her training officer. When Shaw is promoted to Acting Staff Sergeant in season 5, she volunteers to take his place as a training officer. Like her first day as a rookie, her first day as a training officer also ends disastrously when her rookie Duncan Moore contaminated the crime scene and offended a grieving widow when his cellphone started ringing while McNally was speaking with her.

After meeting in the pilot episode, McNally begins a relationship with homicide detective Luke Callaghan, and the two move in together at the end of season 1, although she previously kissed and almost had sex with Swarek, her training officer, before walking out on him, something that leaves them in discomfort for several episodes. She later becomes engaged to Callaghan but breaks up with him after he slept with his ex-girlfriend, Detective Jo Rosati. She finally admits that she has feelings for Swarek, but he has already left on an undercover mission. The last three episodes of season 2 show viewers the beginning of Swarek and McNally's relationship, even though he is undercover, which leads them both to suspension for "conduct unbecoming" when they are discovered. In the beginning of season 3, McNally returns from a trip after her three months' suspension and gets her job back as well as restarting her relationship with Swarek. When her mother suddenly appears in her life due to a work case, she decides to let her back in after she asked for a second chance. After Detective Barber's death, Swarek breaks up with her, which causes a lot of pain for McNally. After a month and a half, and in a life-threatening situation when she is holding a grenade, Swarek says to her that he loves her and then he tries to get her back. Then Detective Callaghan asks her to participate in a task force, which will keep her isolated and away from 15 Division during the mission. She accepts but has to leave immediately, which leaves Swarek drinking at the Penny (the local bar) while waiting for her. In the first episode of season 4, when she returns, she finds out he has been dating Officer Marlo Cruz while she was gone. Later on, Nick confesses his feelings for McNally, and the two embark on a new relationship. When Sam gets shot in the season 4 finale, she goes in the ambulance with Sam, and then confesses that she still loves him. It is shown in season 5 that the two are together again. At the end of season 5, McNally is caught in a bomb attack at the station, but escapes unharmed. In the season 6 episode "Home Run", Swarek proposes to her on a boating trip and she happily accepts. They marry in the season finale, with her best friend Traci serving as the maid of honor.

=== Dov Epstein ===
Dov Epstein
- First appearance: "Fresh Paint" (episode 1.01)
- Portrayed by: Gregory Smith

In-universe information
- Family: Adam Epstein (brother; deceased)

Career
- Rank: Detective (in training); Police Constable (S1–6)
- Epaulette No.: 8721

Portrayed by Gregory Smith

Dov Epstein is one of the series seven protagonists. Described as the "dork" of the batch of rookies assigned to 15 Division, he was a sickly asthmatic kid (he has been seen using his inhaler a number of times in the first two seasons) who watched reruns of Starsky and Hutch. His parents were "hippies", but his grandmother paid for him to have a private education.

He is often shown to be overeager to get involved in everything even when it is not necessary for him to do so, much to the chagrin of his more senior colleagues. This characteristic has gotten him into trouble many times, so much so he has been told to "slow it down". However, in season 2, Epstein's desire to be heavily involved enables him to save a man's life. He is Chris Diaz's best friend and roommate, and later Gail's roommate as well when she moves in with them. In season 2, he meets and becomes involved with Sue, a bomb technician from ETF, whom he always tries to impress, thinking he does not deserve her. They break up when he develops feelings for Crystal, the sister of the boy he shot and killed. In season 4 he has a one-night stand with Chloe Price, a woman he met in a bar and later finds out to be Frank's god-daughter as well as 15 Division's latest officer. By the middle of the season, however, the two of them have started a relationship. When Chloe is shot on the job, Epstein finds out that she is still married to an officer from her old division, Wes. He forgives her for this, but after he discovers that Wes kissed her and she hid the evidence from him, he breaks up with her, much to Chloe's dismay. They later get back together in the near end of season 6.

=== Gail Peck ===
Gail Peck
- First appearance: "Fresh Paint" (episode 1.01)
- Portrayed by: Charlotte Sullivan

In-universe information
- Family: Bill Peck (father); Elaine Peck (mother); Steve Peck (brother)

Career
- Rank: Police Constable (training officer) (S1– )
- Epaulette No.: 8727

Portrayed by Charlotte Sullivan

Gail Peck is one of the series seven protagonists. She spent a few years as a half-goth. Underneath her caustic exterior, Gail is vulnerable and feels lonely. Because of her connections to high-ranking officials in the police force she is often seen by others as getting preferential treatment. She comes from a family of cops; her mother is a superintendent, her father is an inspector, her brother Steve a successful narcotics detective, and her godfather is the chief of police. Because of this, she feels the need to prove to herself and others that she can do the job without help, which further isolates her.

In the first season, she develops a relationship with fellow rookie Chris Diaz. However, the two break up in season 2 because Chris believes that she likes Dov. In the third season it is revealed that she was previously engaged to the new rookie, Nick Collins, with whom she begins a new relationship. Later, she was kidnapped by a cab driver after working undercover as an escort and was rescued. When she takes the fall for a shooting in the 15 Division, her job is questioned, but they give it back to her with the condition that she will be treated as a new rookie. Gail ends up isolating herself between her and her friends due to the way she treats Chloe. Due to jealousy and unresolved feelings, she claims to have cheated on Nick with a detective who worked with him and Andy during their sting operation. She and Nick broke up. Later in season 4, she ends up meeting and befriending Holly, a forensic specialist, new friend, and lesbian. The two share a brief kiss in the coat closet at Frank and Noelle's wedding and kiss again after Gail is shot at in the penultimate episode of season 4. The two begin a new, tentative relationship. At the end of season 5, Gail tells her she decided to adopt Sophie, the orphaned daughter of a woman killed in a case Gail worked on, but Holly tells her that she has accepted a job in San Francisco and wanted Gail to come with her. It is presumed that the two broken up in season 6. Following the events in "Ninety Degrees", she becomes estranged from her father after Steve confesses to his involvement in Commissioner Santana's corruption scandal to spare her from going against her conscience and lying in court. In the season 6 finale "74 Epiphanies", she hooks up with Detective Frankie Anderson at Sam and Andy's wedding.

=== Traci Nash ===
Traci Nash
- First appearance: "Fresh Paint" (episode 1.01)
- Portrayed by: Enuka Okuma

In-universe information
- Nickname: Trace
- Children: Leo (son, with Dex)

Career
- Department: Guns and Gangs (S3– ) Patrol (S1–3)
- Rank: Detective Sergeant (S6– ) Detective (S3–6); Police Constable (S1–3)
- Epaulette No.: 8715

Portrayed by Enuka Okuma

Traci Nash is one of the series seven protagonists. The calm in the eye of the storm and the consummate confidant, Traci is the anchor for her fellow rookies. She is also practical and responsible, likely the result of having had a child, Leo, while in high school. She is a single mother trying to find the balance between her work and her family. Complications arise both at work and at home as she once dated Detective Jerry Barber until she decided to try to get back together with her son's father, Dex. She is always trying to focus on her son and do everything that is best for him. However, this sometimes gets in the way of her being a police officer. She later starts a serious relationship with Detective Barber, culminating in an engagement. In season 3, Traci becomes a detective in training. She is devastated when Detective Barber is murdered in the line of duty. In season 4, Gail's brother, Steve Peck, returns to 15 Division. He is a detective from Guns and Gangs and he develops feelings for Nash. She is wary at first to start a new relationship with him, after Jerry's death. She is also worried about her son Leo getting attached to another man. But Peck proves to her that he is serious about her and the two start dating. After she finds out about Steve's involvement in the corruption and the bombing, she gets devastated and break things off with him.

Traci was first assigned to Noelle Williams as a rookie. Her dedication and empathy for young victims earns her the respect of her more senior colleagues. Of her fellow rookies from the first season, she has risen through the ranks the fastest, having become a detective. In the season 6 finale, she was announced as the newly promoted detective sergeant and head of the Guns and Gangs.

=== Chris Diaz ===
Chris Diaz
- First appearance: "Fresh Paint" (episode 1.01)
- Portrayed by: Travis Milne
- Rank: Police Constable (training officer)

In-universe information
- Religion: Catholic

Portrayed by Travis Milne

Chris Diaz is one of the series seven protagonists. He is often seen as taking the "by the book" approach. He believes in the chain of command, following orders, doing the right thing and above all, he believes in defending the weak. Despite this seemingly good trait, it makes him unable to take initiative. He was brought up in a small black-and-white town. He becomes involved in a relationship with Gail Peck until he is forced to notify the authorities of corruption that Peck's brother's partner was involved in. This temporarily costs him the relationship with Peck. However, the two reconcile and are seen happily together in the beginning of season 2. Their relationship becomes strained later when he thinks that she has feelings for Dov. He accepts his role as a dad after being confronted with a baby by his previous girlfriend in the series, Denise. He considers a transfer to Timmins at the end of the third season because Denise does not want to live in the city. She thinks it is dangerous, and he does not want to be away from his kid. In the fifth episode of season 4, Chris accepted his transfer to Timmins early and leaves, only saying goodbye to Oliver. However, he reappears in the ninth episode of season 4 when he comes to visit for the long weekend with Denise and Christian. Christian is later kidnapped while under the care of Andy and Nick, and it is later to be revealed that he was kidnapped by his biological father, Gene McKenzie. In episode 10, it is revealed that Chris transferred back to 15 Division, hence implying that he and Denise were no longer together. Dov later discovers that Chris is becoming addicted to cocaine, and Diaz takes some personal time-off to recover. In season 6, he gets involved in a relationship with Inspector Jarvis's wife, Jamie.

=== Nick Collins ===
Nick Collins
- First appearance: "The First Day of the Rest of Your Life" (episode 3.01)
- Portrayed by: Peter Mooney
- Rank: Police Constable
- Epaulette No.: 9957

In-universe information
- Full name: Nicholas Michael Collins
- Family: Unnamed parents (deceased); Finn Collins (brother)

Portrayed by Peter Mooney

Nick Collins is a rookie introduced in season 3. Collins served in the Canadian Army for four years and served a tour of duty in Afghanistan. He is dedicated to his job and his friends and is extremely loyal to the point where he has risked his own life several times to save his colleagues.

Collins' parents were killed in a hit and run accident when he was twelve. His brother Finn was paralyzed and they lost touch over the years. After his parents' death, he lived with an uncle but ran away and was subsequently sent to a group home when he was caught stealing a car. By coincidence, Collins runs into the driver who was responsible for the accident at a bar. He nearly kills the man but is stopped by Juliet Ward.

It is said that he was engaged to Gail Peck, and they were ready to marry in Las Vegas before he enlisted. When he comes back, they start a new relationship. His military training and experience has been utilized by his colleagues, especially in cases involving firearms or a hostile situation. In the season 3 finale he is selected as the other officer to participate in Callaghan's task force, and while on the task force, he develops feelings for Andy. He eventually breaks up with Gail when he finds out that she slept with someone else. He was with Andy at the park when Chris' son, Christian, was kidnapped by his biological father in "What I Lost". He and Andy sleep together in the same episode. When Sam Swarek is shot at the end of season 4, Andy confesses to Nick that she still loves Sam. Afterwards in season 5, it is indicated that they were no longer together, although he is on friendly terms with both Andy and Sam. Sometime at the end of season 5, he meets Juliet Ward, an Internal Affairs officer undercover as a street cop placed in 15 Division, and starts to fall for her and pursues her. After Nick confronts the driver involved in the accident that killed his parents and paralyzed his brother, he sleeps with Juliet, and the two appear to be sneaking around afterwards. When she finally tells Nick that is IA, he is upset by this. On her way to the airport, he pulls her over and decides to go to Vancouver to be with Juliet. In the season 6 finale, he states his intention to transfer to the ETF.

=== Chloe Price ===
Chloe Price
- First appearance: "Homecoming" (episode 4.02)
- Portrayed by: Priscilla Faia
- Rank: Police Constable

In-universe information
- Spouse: Wesley Cole (ex-husband)

Portrayed by Priscilla Faia

Chloe Price is one of the series seven protagonists. She appears for the first time in season 4, when she is first introduced as a one-night stand of Dov's and then later revealed to be Frank's goddaughter and the newest rookie to be transferred to 15 Division. Dov later finds out that she was still married, but had never gotten a divorce. When her ex-husband kisses her while she is wearing a camera, Chloe attempts to hide the evidence. But when Dov discovers it, he breaks up with her. Later, Chloe tells Dov to let his anger out on her, and he gets frustrated then kisses her, implying they are back together.

Price is known for her cheerful, bubbly demeanor and has a good relationship with all her colleagues. She is transparent – whatever she is feeling will be exhibited in her facial expressions and she is unable to hide anything.

== Old Guard ==
=== Sam Swarek ===
Sam Swarek
- First appearance: "Fresh Paint" (episode 1.01)
- Portrayed by: Ben Bass

In-universe information
- Full name: Samuel Jay Swarek
- Family: Jay Swarek (father); Unnamed mother Sarah Swarek (sister)
- Spouse: Andy McNally
- Children: Harlow Jay Swarek (daughter) (with Marlo)
- Relatives: Tommy McNally (father-in-law)

Career
- Department: Guns and Gangs (S4– ) Patrol (S1–3)
- Rank: Detective (S4– ) Police Constable (training officer) (S1–3)
- Epaulette No.: 6114

Portrayed by Ben Bass

Sam Swarek is a detective and one of the series seven protagonists. He is known to his superiors as a "rogue cop" because he prefers to follow his instincts instead of the book. Formerly an undercover officer working on a money laundering-cum-drug trafficking operation, his cover was exposed when McNally arrested him, believing him to be a suspect in a murder case. He returns to 15 Division as a training officer, awaiting a position to open up in Guns and Gangs. In season 4 he is promoted to detective.

Swarek is known to shut down and bottle up his emotions, instead taking it out by punching inanimate objects, especially his locker. From Season 4 onwards, he begins opening up to Andy and his long-time friend Oliver Shaw, who are the only people he has confided in. He is extremely loyal to his friends and put his career on the line several times to protect them.

In the season 1 episode "Hot and Bothered", Andy, upset and confused, goes to see him at night and almost sleeps with him. This makes their relationship awkward afterward, but the two talk and make amends later. Although McNally is his love interest, he insists that their relationship is strictly professional. But in season 2, there still might be hope for McNally and him because of McNally's fiancé Luke Callaghan cheating on her. During the end of season's 2 "Best Laid Plans", he went back into undercover operations before he had the chance to become romantically involved with McNally. However, they meet in the following episode and finally hook up. After getting suspended, he asks Andy to have a real relationship, but she leaves town to keep her job, since one of the terms of the suspension was for Swarek and McNally to not see each other, which leaves him disoriented. In the beginning of season 3, Andy convinces him to restart the relationship, although he wants to take it slow. When Andy's mother reappears in her life, he investigates her, and we see that he doesn't like or trust Claire because he blames her for Andy's pain. When Detective Barber dies, he goes into a dark place and starts to question Andy's instincts as a cop. He then wonders how much he will sacrifice for their relationship, so he breaks up with her saying that he cannot take it anymore. Everyone tells him how foolish he is for what he's done, but he has already noticed. When he sees Andy terrified and holding a grenade, he confesses his love for her. Then he tries to convince her that breaking up was a mistake, that he will do anything to make it up to her, but she is hurt and not sure he means it. He asks her for drinks, but he is left waiting as she is already gone for the task force without talking to him. In season 4, he becomes detective and has been dating Officer Marlo Cruz. He was shot by Kevin Ford in the last episode of season 4, but recovers. In season 5, he rekindles his relationship with McNally, and later proposes to her in mid-season 6. On the first episode of season 6, Marlo confesses to him that she's pregnant, and this causes a strain in his and Andy's relationship for some time. He and Oliver Shaw begin to have suspicions about corruption within the police force during season 5 and 6, which is confirmed when Police Commissioner Santana and Steve Peck gets arrested. In the season 6 finale, Swarek marries McNally at a small church wedding with their colleagues and both their fathers present. Shaw, one of his few close friends, was his best man. Swarek owns a goldendoodle named Boo Radley, whom he bought for McNally (as he promised after they previously broken up) before they get married.

For most of the first four seasons, Swarek is largely an enigma. He never spoke of his family or opens up to anyone, despite being popular with his colleagues. In "Big Nickel", he tells McNally that his sister Sarah was attacked when he was a kid, which was why he became a cop. When he was shot in the season 4 finale, it is revealed that he had no next of kin listed and it took Nick Collins several hours to track down Sarah (Robin Brûlé), who reveals that she has not spoken to or seen her brother in years. It is not until season 5 that Swarek's painful childhood is fully revealed, but only after McNally's persistent questioning. His father Jay Swarek (Nicholas Campbell) was an abusive alcoholic who was "in and out of prisons all our lives" and used to hit his wife and two children to the point where the police have been called. Sarah, whom Sam affectionately calls "Square", still visits their father in prison but Sam continuously refused to as he had lingering fears that he would one day be like his father. As a result, the siblings drifted apart over the years, only communicating sporadically through text messaging. Jay is currently imprisoned at Milburn Penitentiary. He was present at Sam's wedding, albeit uninvited, but father and son call an uneasy truce and he tells Sam to "thank your lucky stars you didn't end up like me".

=== Oliver Shaw ===
Oliver Shaw
- First appearance: "Fresh Paint" (episode 1.01)
- Portrayed by: Matt Gordon

In-universe information
- Spouse: Zoe (ex-wife)
- Children: Isabel "Izzy" Shaw; Maddy Shaw (full name unknown); Other daughter unnamed

Career
- Years of service: 1990s–present
- Rank: Staff Sergeant (S5– ) Police Constable (training officer) (S1–5)
- Epaulette No.: 6414

Portrayed by Matt Gordon

Oliver Shaw is one of the rookies' training officers and a 20-year veteran (as of season 6) of the police force. He was introduced in the pilot as the training officer of Andy McNally, a fresh academy graduate and daughter of his own former training officer Tommy McNally.

Shaw is the kind of cop who doesn't go looking for trouble but doesn't shy away from it when it finds him. Despite being their superior, he takes care of the rookies and genuinely cares for them. He appears too laid back and is often seen eating a burger or sandwich in his car while on patrol waiting for a call but reveals that he did it so that his rookie would have the chance to take a breather and not rush into things. During off-hours he is usually seen hanging out with his colleagues, either Swarek or one of the rookies. He is close friends with Swarek, whom he calls "brother", and would serve as best man at Swarek and McNally's wedding.

In season 1, Shaw is portrayed as one of the few older police officers with a functional marriage and family, having a wife and three daughters, but it goes down the drain when his wife finds out he visited a strip club and kicked him out of the house. He and his wife had been on and off before he realizes that she was in love with someone else. He then files for divorce and moves out. He is dating a witch named Celery, played by Emily Hampshire. In season 5, he is promoted to staff sergeant after Frank Best was removed in light of Swarek's shooting and because Ford managed to elude security and enter the premises with a weapon. internal affairs needed a scapegoat and Best stepped down as a result. A self-described "street cop", he has expressed discontent on numerous occasions with remaining behind the desk during a crisis. He is still a very hands-on cop and continues to be a mentor and confidant for his officers; for example, he personally led the search for a young autistic boy who had wandered off.

=== Luke Callaghan ===
Portrayed by Eric Johnson

Luke Callaghan is a homicide detective at 15 Division. Tireless and exceedingly charming, he sometimes butts heads with Swarek over the latter's penchant for bending the rules during investigations. He was involved in a relationship with McNally, despite Swarek warning her that Callaghan had a reputation for dating one rookie a year, until he cheated on her with his ex-girlfriend, Jo Rosati. McNally ends the relationship, but Luke wants her back, and the fallout causes Jo Rosati to leave 15 Division. He is heartbroken but eventually accepts that Andy doesn't want him back. This is particularly seen when he discovers that Andy and Sam had been seeing each other while Sam was undercover. He is gone half of the third season due to a task force mission. He comes back after Gail's kidnapping. At the end of the season, he asks Andy and Nick to participate in the task force with him.

Despite his reputation as a charming "ladies' man", he is dedicated to his work. It is revealed in the season 2 episode "The One That Got Away", that the murder of 15 Division rookie Zoe Martinelli had been weighing heavily on his mind, which explains his determination to finding justice for the victims.

=== Frank Best ===
Lyriq Bent portrays Frank Best. In the first episode of the series, it was revealed that he was newly divorced. Frank was a training officer until he was promoted to Staff Sergeant after Boyko was promoted and departed in the episode "Honor Roll". During season 2, he became romantically involved with Officer Noelle Williams. In season 3, their daughter, Olivia, was born. In season 4, Frank proposed to Noelle after a fake homicide involving Peck and Dov was staged. They later married. In season 5 after the events concluding season 4, Frank is released as Staff Sergeant.

=== Jerry Barber ===
Portrayed by Noam Jenkins

Jerry Barber was a detective at 15 Division who usually worked with Nash and his close friend Swarek. He actively participated in operations and stings, coordinating officers and other resources at his disposal. He later became Traci's boyfriend and eventually sold his car, Stella, as sign that he wants to be serious in being more family oriented. Detective Barber died in episode 9 of season 3 due to a fatal stab wound to the abdomen while trying to solve Peck's kidnapping. Barber's death would affect 15 Division as a grief-stricken Nash struggles to move on while Swarek shuts down emotionally, leading to his break-up with McNally.

=== Noelle Williams ===
Melanie Nicholls-King portrays Noelle Williams. Another training officer and veteran of the police force, she hoped to become head of her police platoon but was beaten out by Frank Best. Noelle is not only great at her job, but she is also an invaluable mentor for the rookies in her division. During the first season, she was trying to get pregnant with the aid of hormone injections. She was caught by Traci who subsequently helped her. In episode 9 of season 2, she and Frank Best kiss, embarking on a relationship. It is revealed in the finale of season 2 that Noelle is pregnant with Frank Best's child and in the beginning of the third season, she is keeping it a secret. In episode 9 of season 3, she goes into labour a month early and delivers a healthy baby girl named Olivia. In season 4, she becomes engaged to Staff Sergeant Frank Best after he proposes to her following a faked homicide involving officers Peck and Epstein. On their wedding day, Noelle goes missing, and Traci discovers that she is planning to ditch the wedding because she had found a possibly-cancerous lump in her breast. She is later convinced to go through with the wedding, and has since been optimistic about her recovery. In season 6 she returns to 15 Division to help clear Shaw's name after undercover IA officer Juliet Ward discovers that the corrupt Commissioner Santana was planning to cover up his misdeeds by pinning everything on Shaw.

=== Marlo Cruz ===
Rachael Ancheril portrays Marlo Cruz. During the six months in which Andy and Nick are away, Sam moves on and enters into a relationship with her. She is well liked by everyone, but she and Andy end up in situations together as partners. The tension between them builds. It is later revealed that she is bipolar, and she tells Andy, who promises to keep her secret. In episode 12 of season 4, Marlo's obsession with proving a man is a child molester causes her condition to take her over. When the man is attacked after Marlo confronted him, Andy tells Sam about Marlo being bi-polar and they try to hide her involvement in the case. Her job is on the line, after she may have caused something very tragic for 15 Division, and moves to a job as an analyst. When she is put on a case with 15 Division, there is some tension between her and Andy. It is revealed at the end of season five that she is pregnant with Sam's child. Their daughter is born at the end of Season 6.

== Supporting characters ==
=== Tommy McNally ===
Peter MacNeill portrays Tommy McNally. He is Andy's father. Formerly a homicide detective, he has a drinking problem. His wife, Claire, abandoned him and Andy when she was a kid. In the first season, Andy tries to help him. He refuses at first but finally agrees after she gives him an ultimatum. In episode 11 of season 1, he becomes a murder suspect. Swarek and Andy try to prove that he didn't do it, and they succeed. He appears in the season 6 finale, giving Andy away to Sam in their wedding.

=== Claire McNally ===
Barbara Williams portrays Claire McNally. She is Andy's mother. She works in social services. She had an affair with a professor when Andy was a kid and asked her to leave with her, which Andy refused. Andy's father then gets custody of her and forbids Claire to talk to or visit her, as she was confused and hurt. She returns to her life during a work case, which reveals many contradictory emotions for both of them. Andy finally accepts her back, and during the season, we see them doing some mother/daughter things together.

=== Donovan Boyd ===
Aaron Abrams portrays Donovan Boyd. He is a guns and gangs detective who seems to be always over the edge. He is the one who drags Swarek into undercover operations. He gets ticked off with Andy when she and Chris arrest a drug dealer who is part of an operation that he is running on the dark, which makes him look like a fool. At the end of the second season, he recruits Andy, Traci and Dov to go on a little scavenger hunt to accumulate drugs and money. That ends with Andy running into Swarek, who is also on an undercover operation with a dangerous criminal, Jamie Brennan. Boyd is responsible for the cover up of Brennan's wife and daughter's murder, which puts Sam at risk as Boyd didn't create a proper cover story for Swarek.

=== Jo Rosati ===
Camille Sullivan portrays Jo Rosati. Appears from episodes 1 to 7 in the second season. She is a homicide detective. She was engaged to Luke, as they were partnered together for three years before leaving to pursue a career opportunity that only one of them could take even though Luke wanted them to stay together. She comes back to 15 Division trying to get Luke back, just to find out he is with Andy now. This situation puts her in the middle of Luke and Andy's relationship. After Luke is shot, she convinces him to do a surveillance job in a hotel room, and they hook up in the end. While partnered with Andy, the truth comes out, and Andy calls off the engagement. Luke asks her to leave because he wants to get Andy back.

=== Sue Tran ===
Mayko Nguyen portrays Sue Tran. She is a bomb technician for ETF. She meets Dov when he is trapped by a bomb in a drug lab and saves him. On their first date she helps him solve a robbery bank case. In the beginning of season three it seems that they live together. Later on, Dov breaks up with her because of his feelings for the sister of the boy he shot, Crystal.

=== Holly Stewart ===
Aliyah O'Brien portrays Holly Stewart. Appears for the first time in Season 4 Episode 7. She is a forensic pathologist who soon becomes one of Gail's closest friends and later girlfriend when they encounter during an investigation. Holly Stewart is a lesbian. At the end of season 4, Holly and Gail begin a tentative relationship. When they go meet Holly's friends in the third episode of season 5, Gail overhears a conversation with Holly and her friend which upsets her and causes her to leave. After ignoring her calls, Gail has forgiven Holly, but she has moved on already. After some time, Holly gets back with Gail. But they broke up when she was accepted for a job in San Francisco.

=== Bailey ===
Jim Codrington portrays ETF Sgt Bailey. He is seen throughout seasons 3–5 with his team helping the officers of 15 Division

=== Steve Peck ===
Adam MacDonald portrays Steve Peck. Steve is Gail's older brother and a corrupt detective in the Guns and Gangs division. He is partnered up with Traci to serve as a distraction from dealing with the copycat of the man that murdered Jerry, her dead fiancé. He ends up having feelings for Traci which are reciprocated, but she doesn't think it's the right time. They later get involved until Steve is arrested for the bomb in the evidence room and his involvement in the corruption with Police Commissioner Alonso Santana (Richard Chevolleau).

=== Celery ===
Emily Hampshire portrays Celery. Celery is dating Oliver. Oliver first met her when she was arrested with suspicion of poisoning somebody, but it was soon very obvious that she had nothing to do with it. Oliver later takes her to Frank's wedding which was their first date.

=== Crystal Markes ===
Portrayed by Mouna Traoré

Crystal Markes is the sister of a teen criminal killed by Dov while robbing a store. As he feels guilty, he tries to help her and her family any way he can, but ultimately she finds out who he is and confronts him. A troubled relationship develops between them that makes Dov break up with Sue. After her family finds out via her cousin that she has been seeing Dov, her family distances themselves and she has to move out.

== Other characters ==
=== Sergeant Boyko ===
Aidan Devine portrays Sergeant Boyko, until his departure in episode 8 of season 1.

== See also ==
- Rookie Blue
- List of Rookie Blue episodes
