= Rookie Blue season 6 =

Rookie Blue
- Season 6
- DVD cover
- No. of episodes: 11

Release
- Original network: Global
- Original release: May 21 – July 29, 2015

Season chronology
- ← Previous; Season 5

The sixth and final season of Rookie Blue premiered on May 21, 2015 on Global, containing the remaining episodes for the fifth season that have been re-branded as season six.

== Production ==
Originally produced as the second half of a 22 episode season five, and later re-branded as season six. It premiered in Canada on Global on Thursday, May 21, 2015. On June 11, 2015, Global announced that Rookie Blue would move to Wednesday nights at 9:00 p.m. beginning June 24, 2015. The final two episodes of the season moved to Wednesday nights at 10:00 p.m. on Global. Rookie Blue premiered in the United States on ABC on June 25, 2015. Melanie Nicholls-King returned as Detective Noelle Williams, following her absence during season 5.

Season 6 ends with the announcement that Tassie Cameron would be leaving her role as executive producer.

== Cast ==
=== Main cast ===
- Missy Peregrym as Officer Andy McNally
- Gregory Smith as Officer / Detective Dov Epstein
- Charlotte Sullivan as Officer Gail Peck
- Enuka Okuma as Detective / Detective Sergeant Traci Nash
- Travis Milne as Officer Chris Diaz
- Peter Mooney as Officer Nick Collins
- Priscilla Faia as Officer Chloe Price
- Adam MacDonald as Detective Steve Peck
- Matt Gordon as Officer / Staff Sergeant Oliver Shaw
- Ben Bass as Detective Sam Swarek

=== Recurring ===
- Erin Karpluk as Officer Juliette Ward
- Melanie Nicholls-King as IA Officer/Detective Noelle Williams
- Rachael Ancheril as Detective Marlo Cruz
- Katharine Isabelle as Detective Frankie Anderson

== Episodes ==
No. overall	No. in season	Title	Directed by	Written by	Original release date	Canadian viewers (millions)
64	1	"Open Windows"	Peter Stebbings	Tassie Cameron	May 21, 2015	1.532
A month after the evidence room bombing, Andy and Sam return from a much-needed vacation ready to work. Andy is attacked by an intruder at Traci's place, the Sex Crimes Unit steps in to take over the case their way, and the 15 Division will have to decide whether to take matters into their own hands.
65	2	"Perfect Family"	Eleanore Lindo	Adriana Maggs	May 28, 2015	1.576
Andy and Traci deal with a missing person case. Dov and Marlo dig deeper in to the Division Bombing while Chris is trying to keep his secret while Andy is dealing with the heart breaking news.
66	3	"Uprising"	Gregory Smith	Sherry White	June 4, 2015	1.686
Andy, Nick, Gail, and the new officer Juliet Ward go to a women's prison for a prisoner transfer. However when a riot starts, the four are separated with Andy and Juliet trapped with a desperate woman.
67	4	"Letting Go"	Steve Dimarco	Tassie Cameron & Katrina Saville	June 11, 2015	1.603
Nick is forced to reveal his past after his brother returns.
68	5	"A Real Gentleman"	Paul Fox	Karen Moore	June 18, 2015	1.568
The team thinks Traci has been kidnapped.
69	6	"Home Run"	Gregory Smith	Shelley Eriksen	June 24, 2015	1.422
A drive by shooter takes aim at the squad during a baseball game. Sam proposes to Andy
70	7	"Best Man"	Charles Officer	Adriana Maggs & Enuka Okuma	July 1, 2015	1.478
Andy and Sam learn that Oliver is the prime suspect in an internal affair's corruption investigation.
71	8	"Integrity Test"	James Genn	Alan McCullough	July 8, 2015	1.366
Traci shadows Steve Peck, hoping to calm her fears about his involvement in the bombing. Sam, Andy, Dov, Gail and Nick race against time to prove Oliver's innocence with a risky plan.
72	9	"Ninety Degrees"	T.W. Peacocke	Tassie Cameron & Bradley Simpson	July 15, 2015	1.466
Tensions boil over at 15 Division after a heatwave hits town. Traci and Gail are at odds after Steve is sent to prison. Gail is faced with a difficult decision during Steve's trial. Andy is called to investigate a stabbing at the mental health facility Marlo attends her therapy sessions. While trying to talk down a suicidal patient, Marlo goes into labor and Sam's daughter is born. Chloe and Dov have a heart-to-heart to sort out their feelings.
73	10	"Breaking Up the Band"	Jason Priestley	Noelle Carbone	July 22, 2015	1.215
After the corruption scandal at the 15 Division, the squad members are being split up to different divisions and Andy tries to figure out where she stands in Sam's life.
74	11	"74 Epiphanies"	David Wellington	Tassie Cameron	July 29, 2015	1.477
Andy is carjacked on the way to her wedding to Sam, Traci is promoted to Detective Sergeant, Dov is promoted to Detective-in-training, Oliver regains his position as Staff Sergeant, and Nick and Duncan leave 15.

== U.S. Nielsen ratings ==
The following is a table for the United States ratings, based on average total estimated viewers per episode, of Rookie Blue on ABC.

Season 6 (ABC)
#	#	Title	U.S. air date	Rating/share (18-49)	Viewers (millions)
64	1	"Open Windows"	June 25, 2015	0.63▼	3.76▼
65	2	"Perfect Family"	July 2, 2015	0.66▲	3.78▲
66	3	"Uprising"	July 9, 2015	0.70▲	4.24▲
67	4	"Letting Go"	July 16, 2015	0.74▲	3.66▼
68	5	"A Real Gentleman"	July 23, 2015	0.79▲	3.83▲
69	6	"Home Run"	July 30, 2015	0.70▼	3.66▼
70	7	"Best Man"	August 6, 2015	0.60▼	3.12▼
71	8	"Integrity Test"	August 13, 2015	0.60	3.34▲
72	9	"Ninety Degrees"	August 20, 2015	0.60	3.62▲
73	10	"Breaking Up The Band"	August 27, 2015	0.50▼	3.44▼
74	11	"74 Epiphanies"	September 3, 2015	0.70▲	3.68▲
