= Pyewacket =

Pyewacket may refer to:

- Pyewacket (familiar spirit), a familiar spirit reported by an alleged witch in 1644
- Pyewacket (film), a 2017 Canadian film by Adam MacDonald
- Pyewacket (novel), a 1967 children's novel by Rosemary Weir
- Pye Wacket, an experimental missile
- Pyewacket (yacht), a sailing yacht commissioned in 2004 by Roy E. Disney
- Pyewacket, a fictional cat in Bell, Book and Candle
