= Lawrence G. Green =

South African journalist and writer

Lawrence George Green
- Born: 5 January 1900
- Died: 14 May 1972
- Occupations: Author, Journalist

Lawrence George Green (5 January 1900 – 14 May 1972) was a South African journalist and writer. Eschewing any grandiose view of his literature and his way of life, he wrote for the layman and general reading entertainment as a raconteur. As such his writings, though well populated with researched fact through his wide travels and many hours of research in the South African and British archives, do not constitute in any strict sense historical or academic reference works. Nevertheless, he remains frequently cited as a recorder of little remembered or noted fact of some historical or cultural significance in the southern African domain.

== Early life and education ==
Green was born in Kimberley, Cape Colony, the only son of George Alfred Lawrence Green (a newspaper editor who went on to become a member of parliament in the first Union of South Africa and editor-in-chief of the Cape Argus) and Katherine (née Bell). He was educated at private schools in Grahamstown and Cape Town, completing his secondary education at South African College Schools.

Against his father’s wishes, he did not gain any tertiary education. In 1917 he was accepted as an air cadet in the Royal Flying Corps at Denham, England. He however never graduated as a pilot, allegedly because of a poor grasp of mechanical aspects of aircraft operation. On his return to SA at the end of World War 1, while contemplating a life in the merchant navy, he settled on a career in journalism with the Cape Argus.

Although Green never married, he maintained a close and well documented platonic relationship with Luise (“Lulu”) Yates-Benyon, the mother of his biographer-to-be, John Yates-Benyon. On his death in 1972 from metastasized melanoma, he was survived by two sisters, Rita and Rosemary. The latter was a successful UK author of adolescent literature, for example Pyewacket (novel), under her married name of Rosemary Weir.

== Literary career ==
Early signs of Green’s writing talents are evidenced by his winning of an international essay competition at the age of nine with a piece titled, “A Day in the Country”. Little is documented about Green’s subsequent literary ambitions until he drifted into journalism with the Cape Argus during his father’s tenure as editor. While showing talent as a journalist he declined offers of promotion or new postings to advance his newspaper career, being content to fulfil his duties as contributor to the Cape Argus’s daily “Wanderer’s” column, and other assignments, on the proviso he could remain in Cape Town. For a brief period he left the newspaper to try his hand in London as a Fleet Street reporter, but soon returned to the Argus.

In the formative phase of his writing career he experimented briefly with fiction writing but discarded this in favour of travelogues and other non-fiction, claiming to have little of value to offer the reader in the former genre even though an admirer of novelists such as Ernest Hemingway, Graham Greene and W. Somerset Maugham. Instead, he gained popular renown for his evocative tales on southern African travels, discovery and 18th, 19th and 20th century local history. His first success came with the publication of short stories in foreign magazines from 1929 onwards. His first book was published in 1933 in the UK, as were his next five books.

By virtue of restricting his writings to popular non-fiction, Green is seldom mentioned in either local or international references as an African writer of note. However, amongst cognoscenti of travelogues and cultural history and collectors of Africana, he remains highly regarded and is sometimes cited as belonging to a select group of English travel writers of the 20th century such as Eric Newby and Wilfred Thesiger, though he cannot be considered a writer in the heroic travel idiom. Even though an intrepid traveller in especially Europe and Africa, he had a predilection to travelling in style and declined any rough travel where he could so.

His writing more correctly typifies the mid 20th century colonial and post-colonial era non-fiction writing of Southern Africa, along with others of note such as F.C. Metrowich, T.V. Bulpin and Eric Rosenthal. In a number of respects his literary career ran concurrent with that of Laurens van der Post though there is no record of the two literary figures ever meeting. Inherently conservative and Eurocentric in style, Green's work nevertheless encompasses all the cultural diversity of the sub-continent, often alluding to changes in the social and political milieu but rarely judgemental in regard to socio-political issues under debate at the time. Unlike many of his contemporaries of South African literature, he is however devoid of any political commentary or critique. He employed mainly first and third person narrative style in short story chapter form, usually contained within a book with particular thematic content.

Green ranks as one of the most prolific writers to come out of Africa. Sales of all his published books amount to more than 750,000 copies. In all, he produced 34 books (including a writer's guide), at least 16 stories for foreign and local magazines and many newspaper articles and letters. Six of his best-selling books were subsequently reproduced and published under different titles in the UK and at least three translated into a foreign language. He published on average a book a year between 1933 and 1972, other than the World War 2 years where his duties with the Royal and South African Air Force in north Africa impacted on his free time.

His publications in his earlier writing career ran concurrently with his duties as journalist for the Cape Argus. By 1954, earnings from his books were such that he was able to retire from journalism to pursue writing full-time and he continued to publish at the rate of a book a year thereafter up to his death.

== Personality and reputation ==
All who knew Green characterised him as a retiring, solitary figure who studiously avoided publicity, other than through his published writing. He however was willing to grant time and advice to aspiring writers when called on to do so, as attested by private correspondence.

While one biography on Green exists (Memories of a Friendship, John Yates-Benyon, Howard Timmins, 1973) he remains, despite his stature as a man of letters and popular literature, an enigma. According to lifelong friend and confidant, Scott Haigh, he professed on a number of occasions to be about to commence his autobiography, but never formally did so, a fact corroborated by Yates-Benyon. Green's reminiscences in Where Men Still Dream: The life and memories, travels and encounters of a South African writer (1945) and When the Journey's Over (1972) come as close to autobiographical as his long writing career allowed.

Howard Timmins, previous head of the Cape Town-based but now defunct Howard Timmins & Co. publishing firm, was also ranked as close friend of the author. Timmins was responsible for the bulk of the writer’s book publishing in South Africa. He and Haigh similarly, in tributes to Green contained in The Best of Lawrence Green, a book of collected writings and reminisces of Green, edited by Haigh, alluded to the author’s reserve and shunning of publicity.

== Works ==
=== Non-fiction – Original titles ===
- The Coast of Treasure, 1933, Putnam, UK
- Great African Mysteries, 1935, Stanley Paul, UK
- Secret Africa, 1936, Stanley Paul, UK
- The Coast of Diamonds, 1937, Stanley Paul, UK
- Strange Africa, 1938, Stanley Paul, UK
- Old Africa Untamed, 1940, Stanley Paul, UK
- Where Men Still Dream, 1945, Howard Timmins, SA
- So Few Are Free, 1946, Howard Timmins, SA
- Tavern of the Seas, 1947, Howard Timmins, SA
- To The River's End, 1948, Howard Timmins, SA
- In The Land of the Afternoon, 1949, Howard Timmins, SA
- At Daybreak for the Isles, 1950, Howard Timmins, SA
- Growing Lovely, Growing Old, 1951, Howard Timmins, SA
- Lords of the Last Frontier, 1952, Howard Timmins, SA
- Under a Sky Like Flame, 1954, Howard Timmins, SA
- Karoo, 1955, Howard Timmins, SA
- There's a Secret Hid Away, 1956, Howard Timmins, SA
- Beyond the City Lights, 1957, Howard Timmins, SA
- South African Beachcomber, 1958, Howard Timmins, SA
- These Wonders to Behold, 1959, Howard Timmins, SA
- Eight Bells at Salamander, 1960, Howard Timmins, SA
- Great North Road, 1961, Howard Timmins, SA
- Something Rich and Strange, 1962, Howard Timmins, SA
- A Decent Fellow Doesn't Work, 1963, Howard Timmins, SA
- I Heard the Old Men Say, 1964, Howard Timmins, SA
- Almost Forgotten Never Told, 1965, Howard Timmins, SA
- Thunder on the Blaauwberg, 1966, Howard Timmins, SA
- On Wings of Fire, 1967, Howard Timmins, SA
- Full Many a Glorious Morning, 1968, Howard Timmins, SA
- Harbours of Memory, 1969, Howard Timmins, SA
- A Giant in Hiding, 1970, Howard Timmins, SA
- A Taste of the South- Easter, 1971, Howard Timmins, SA
- When the Journeys Over, 1972, Howard Timmins, SA

=== Non-fiction – Republished in UK under different titles ===
- White Man's Grave, 1954, Stanley Paul, UK
- Panther Head, 1955, Stanley Paul, UK
- The Drums of Time, 1956, Stanley Paul, UK
- Old Africa's Last Secrets, 1961, Putnam, UK
- Islands Time Forgot, 1962, Putnam, UK
- Like Diamond Blazing, 1967, Robert Hale, UK

=== Non-fiction – Translated into other languages ===
- Min Mense is Vry (So Few Are Free), 1948, Malherbe (Afrikaans)
- Karoo (Karoo), 1964, Malherbe (Afrikaans)
- Ahol Megállt Az Idő (Islands Time Forgot), 1964, T/K Budapest (Magyar)
- Последние тайны старой Африки (Old Africa's Last Secrets), 1966, Mysl' (Russian), USSR
- Острова, не тронутые временем (Islands Time Forgot), 1972, Glavnaya redaktsia vostochnoi literatury (Russian), USSR
- Тайны Берега Скелетов (Mysteries of the Skeleton Coast), 1993, Misteria (Russian), Russia

=== Non-fiction – Articles for magazines ===
- Bottle Messages from the Sea, Adventure, 1 July 1929
- Captain Flynn’s Chart, Sea Stories, Oct 1929
- Diamond Camp, The Passing Show, 20 April 1935
- Fishing for Cable, The Wide World Magazine, Mar 1939
- Flaw in the System, Excitement, Aug 1930
- The Ghost Drink, Sea Stories, Dec 1929
- In the Fog, Sea Stories, Nov 1929
- Monkey Folk of Africa, Adventure, 15 February 1929
- Off Ascension, Sea Stories, Jun 1930
- Over the Horizon, Sea Stories, Jul 1929
- The Schooner’s Secret, Sea Stories, Apr 1930
- Sea Mecca, Sea Stories, Aug 1929
- A Secret of the Desert, Hutchinson’s Adventure-Story Magazine, Sep 1926
- Smelling Danger, Sea Stories, May 1930
- Virgin Peak, The Saturday Evening Post, 6 December 1947, Argosy (UK) Apr 1948
- Inland fleets of Africa, S.A. Saturday Book, 1948.

=== Technical ===
- Author’s Post-War Guide, 1947, Allen & Unwin
