= Holiday in Handcuffs =

2007 American crime comedy television film by Ron Underwood

- Promotional poster
- Genre: Crime comedy; Romantic comedy
- Written by: Sara Endsley
- Directed by: Ron Underwood
- Starring: Melissa Joan Hart; Mario Lopez
- Music by: Danny Lux
- Country of origin: United States
- Original language: English

Production
- Executive producers: Jody Brockway; Craig McNeil
- Producers: Tom Cox; Jordy Randall; Murray Ord; Craig McNeil
- Production location: Calgary
- Cinematography: Derick Underschultz
- Editor: Don Brochu
- Running time: 86 minutes
- Production company: Hand Cuff Productions Inc.
- Budget: $5 million

Original release
- Network: ABC Family
- Release: December 9, 2007

Holiday in Handcuffs is a 2007 American crime comedy television film directed by Ron Underwood, written by Sara Endsley, and starring Melissa Joan Hart, Mario Lopez, Tim Bottoms, Kyle Howard, Vanessa Evigan, Markie Post, and June Lockhart. It originally aired on ABC Family on December 9, 2007, as part of the network's 25 Days of Christmas programming block.

== Plot ==
Trudie Chandler is an aspiring painter currently working as a restaurant waitress. With the pressure to please her parents building, she misses a job interview, gets dumped by her boyfriend Nick just before Christmas, and has a nervous breakdown. Stressed about going home for the holidays without a boyfriend, she kidnaps David Martin, a random customer at the restaurant, and introduces him to her parents as Nick. Trudie's family is vacationing at a very isolated log cabin away from anyone else, so David is unable to escape, although he makes several attempts. He finally decides to play along until the police come, but ultimately falls in love with Trudie and understands the family pressure that made her feel forced to kidnap him in the first place.

During Christmas dinner, the holiday comes to an abrupt end when Trudie's parents begin to fight, her brother Jake announces that he is gay, and her sister Katie says that she has quit law school and bought a Pilates studio with her parents' tuition money. The police then arrive and arrest the family during Christmas dinner, revealing that David is not actually Trudie's boyfriend. Before he was kidnapped, David had a successful job and a beautiful, rich girlfriend; however, during his time with Trudie and her family, he realizes his life has developed into something he did not intend. David decides not to press charges and the family is released (except for Trudie's grandma Dolores, for attempting to resist arrest); afterward, Trudie does not see or hear from David for a few months, but learns that he will be engaged.

Trudie is invited to show her art at a local gallery, which her family attends, and she reconciles with them. She is stunned to see one of her pieces sold during the show. As she is leaving the show, she is kidnapped by David and taken to a nearby building. He tells her he bought the building and is making it into an architecture/art studio. He decided to turn his life around and do something he really loves: owning his own architecture business. His business also includes an art studio, and his first art piece is Trudie's painting, which he purchased. David admits his love for Trudie and Trudie admits her love for him as well, before they kiss.

== Cast ==
- Melissa Joan Hart as Gertrude "Trudie" Marie Chandler
- Mario Lopez as David Martin
- Markie Post as Katherine Chandler
- Tim Bottoms as Richard Chandler
- June Lockhart as Grandma Dolores
- Kyle Howard as Jake Chandler
- Vanessa Evigan as Katie Chandler
- Gabrielle Miller as Jessica Barber
- Layla Alizada as Lucy
- Cedric De Souza as Taj
- Marty Hanenberg as Mr. Portnoy
- Ben Ayres as (the real) Nick
- Travis Milne as Ryan, Jake's boyfriend

== Production ==
Holiday in Handcuffs was filmed in Calgary, Alberta, Canada, in 2007.

== Ratings ==
The movie received 6.7 million viewers and a 2.4 in adults 18 to 49, making it the most watched telecast in ABC Family history.

== Home releases ==
Holiday in Handcuffs was released on Region 1 DVD on October 7, 2008. It was re-released along with the television film Snowglobe on October 13, 2009.

== See also ==
- List of Christmas films
