= The Detail =

Canadian television series

- Genre: Police procedural
- Developed by: Ley Lukins
- Starring: Angela Griffin; Shenae Grimes-Beech; Wendy Crewson; David Cubitt; Al Mukadam; Matt Gordon; Ben Bass
- Composers: Ian LeFeuvre; Benjamin Pinkerton
- Country of origin: Canada
- Original language: English
- No. of seasons: 1
- No. of episodes: 10

Production
- Executive producers: Ley Lukins; Adam Pettle; Ilana Frank; Linda Pope; Jocelyn Hamilton; Sally Wainwright; Nicola Shindler; Sonia Hokso; Gregory Smith
- Producer: Kathy Avrich Johnson
- Production location: Greater Toronto Area
- Cinematography: David Perrault
- Editors: Teresa Hannigan; Jean Coulombe; Teresa De Luca
- Running time: 48 minutes
- Production company: ICF Films

Original release
- Network: CTV
- Release: March 25 – June 3, 2018

The Detail is a Canadian television police procedural drama series, developed by Ley Lukins, that premiered on CTV on March 25, 2018. The series, which stars Angela Griffin in the lead role of Detective Stevie Hall, features a trio of female homicide detectives who solve crimes while dealing with their own personal lives. Although the series uses original scripts, the format is based upon British crime drama series Scott & Bailey. Following commission, a debut series of ten episodes was ordered by the network.

On June 5, 2018, just two days after the finale, it was announced that CTV had declined a recommission and the show would be cancelled after one season. Outside of Canada, the series was purchased by Viacom for broadcast on 5USA in the United Kingdom, with broadcast commencing on November 2, 2018.

== Cast ==
- Angela Griffin as Det. Stevie Hall
- Shenae Grimes-Beech as Det. Jacqueline "Jack" Cooper
- Wendy Crewson as Staff Inspector Fiona Currie
- David Cubitt as Det. Kyle Price
- Al Mukadam as Det. Aaron Finch
- Matt Gordon as Det. Donnie Sullivan
- Ben Bass as Marc Savage
- Claire Qute as Katie Hall
- Richie Lawrence as Nate Hall
- Dan Abramovici as Noah Griffin
- Elizabeth Whitmere as Rita Moretti

== Episodes ==
No.	Title	Directed by	Written by	Original release date	United Kingdom viewers (millions)
1	"Wake Up Call"	Gregory Smith	Ley Lukins	March 25, 2018; November 2, 2018 (UK)	0.40
Det. Cooper, expecting a proposal of marriage, is shocked when her partner Marc (Ben Bass) breaks up with her on their first anniversary. Meanwhile, the 39-year-old housewife of Dr. Hickman Rashi (Husein Madhavji) is found dead by suspected suicide. Det. Hall suspects foul play when she discovers the victim bears signs of injury that do not relate to her death. Further investigation reveals the victim was twelve weeks pregnant, which suggests a potential motive for murder. Det. Hall also has to fend off the attentions of her former boyfriend, Det. Price (David Cubitt), who still holds a torch for her.: Based on the Scott & Bailey episode "Congratulations" (Series 1, Episode 1).
2	"The Past is Never Dead"	Jordan Canning	Naledi Jackson	April 1, 2018; November 9, 2018 (UK)	0.42
The murder of computer programmer Keith Mitchell (Hershel Blatt), an employee of a business operating a pornographic website, is complicated by the discovery that he was in possession of vehicle that he did not own at the time of the murder, which in turn also contained a holdall packed to the brim with sex toys belonging to a third party. Det. Hall and Det. Cooper discover that the murder may be linked to a revenge porn video posted on the dark web, and interview a school janitor whose daughter was the subject of the video. Shortly after she and Marc agree to move on, Det. Cooper discovers she is pregnant.
3	"The Devil and the Deep Blue Sea"	Kelly Makin	Sandra Chwialkowska	April 8, 2018; November 16, 2018 (UK)	0.28
The imprisonment of Martin Reed, a convicted murder serving three consecutive life sentences for the murder of three homeless men, comes into question when a fourth victim is discovered, seemingly murdered in a 'copycat' style. Insp. Currie, having worked on the original investigation, asks Det. Cooper to interview Reed, while Diane Taylor (Kari Matchett), one of her former colleagues from Major Crimes, reorders the original investigation to be re-opened. Meanwhile, Det. Hall and Det. Pryce follow up a lead on missing teenager Brooke Dodson, with help from the files of a former missing persons' case investigated by Det. Hall's father.: Based on the Scott & Bailey episode "Pipe Dreams" (Series 2, Episode 3).
4	"Secret Liars"	Sarah St. Onge	Ley Lukins	April 15, 2018; November 23, 2018 (UK)	0.33
Deanna Williams, a sixteen-year-old student and peer tutor, is found dead in the boot of her father's car, having been raped and repeatedly stabbed. Det. Hall and Det. Cooper are led to a local park where Deanna and her friends were known to hang out, and find an abandoned camper van which contains traces of Deanna's blood. The owner of the camper, Matt Chatland, denies murder and claims that his only reason for pitching up in the park is to sell marijuana. But when a search of his family home uncovers a bloodied shirt stained with the blood of another murder victim, suspicion switches towards his son, Cole.: Based on the Scott & Bailey episode "Surprise" (Series 1, Episode 2).
5	"The Long Walk"	Jordan Canning	Naledi Jackson	April 23, 2018; November 30, 2018 (UK)	0.28
Det. Hall and Det. Cooper find themselves on the stand for the trial of Zach Grayson, a rising Hockey star accused of the murder of a college student, Beth Tremblay. The detectives set to establish a pattern of behaviour by showcasing the sexual assault of another victim, Emma Write. But when Marc is unexpected called upon to act as defence lawyer for the accused, Det. Cooper realises that his intention to use information privately disclosed during their relationship to his advantage could potentially cause severe harm to the case. Hours after revealing her pregnancy to Marc, Det. Cooper suffers a miscarriage.: Based on the Scott & Bailey episode "Personal" (Series 1, Episode 3).
6	"When One Door Closes"	Grant Harvey	Adam Pettle	April 30, 2018; December 7, 2018 (UK)	0.28
After being missing for nine weeks, teenager Brooke Dodson's whereabouts are confirmed when her body is found discarded by a group of tourists on the coastline. Supt. Currie assigns Det. Price as the lead investigator in the search for Alvin Flowers, who has also disappeared. Dets. Hall, Cooper & Sullivan track down an employee of a local massage parlour who appears to have been meeting Flowers in secret for the past week. Information provided leads the team to a convicted con artist known as 'Hot Gus', who turns out to be a relative of Flowers. As the team close in on their man, they make an unexpected discovery.
7	"Bad Traffic"	John Fawcett	Sarah Goodman & Ley Lukins	May 6, 2018; December 14, 2018 (UK)	0.30
The murder of a bike courier suspected of selling MDMA at an illegal house party has personal repercussions for Det. Cooper when she finds her estranged brother Owen amongst the partygoers. Despite protesting his innocence in the crime, Owen appears to have injuries which relate to a fight with the victim, and under pressure from Det. Hall, confesses that he is unable to remember the exact details of an altercation between them. With nowhere to turn for help, Det. Cooper calls upon Marc to represent Owen, while she and Det. Finch try to uncover the truth about what really happened to the victim.
8	"A Junkie's Broken Promise"	James Genn	Graeme Stewart	May 13, 2018; December 21, 2018 (UK)	0.24
Meth addict Leroy Tate is found murdered in a takeaway dumpster, his corpse having been stabbed several times before being set alight with gasoline. Two youths point Det. Cooper in the direction of Tanya Pink, a fellow junkie and close friend of Leroy. Later, a second body is found, and DNA evidence identifies the victim as Tanya's brother, Dustin. Dets. Hall and Cooper are forced to work in the face of adversity to try and uncover out how the murders may be connected to the disappearance of a family dog. Meanwhile, Marc makes a play for Det. Cooper's affections, and Det. Hall's marriage continues to crumble.: Based on the Scott & Bailey episodes "Loyalty" and "Secrets" (Series 2, Episodes 1 & 2).
9	"It Takes a Village"	Grant Harvey	Katrina Seville	May 27, 2018; December 28, 2018 (UK)	0.31
When convicted criminal Jason Doone is found with three gunshot wounds to his head, his wife, Tracy-Lynn, becomes the prime suspect for his murder. Neighbours report hearing the pair rowing in the hours before his death, and the fact Tracy-Lynn appears to have been the victim of a beating only intensifies the motive for murder. However, with little to no evidence to confirm Tracy-Lynn's involvement, Staff Insp. Currie orders the team to look into suspicious activity at the foster home where Tracy-Lynn's fifteen-year-old daughter Annabelle resides. Meanwhile, Det. Hall decides to look into Alvin Flowers' suicide.
10	"Off the Path"	Gregory Smith	Ley Lukins	June 3, 2018; January 4, 2019 (UK)	N/A
Staff Insp. Currie mounts an investigation to locate Det. Hall. Held up in a remote woodland cabin, Det. Hall questions Harry over his real involvement in the Flowers case, and uncovers the shocking truth that her father did not commit suicide, and was in fact murdered. A search of Harry's home uncovers hair samples from each of Flowers' victims, which were never declared as evidence in the case, suggesting that Harry may have in fact framed Flowers for multiple murders. As the team organise a raid on a motel frequented by Harry, Det. Cooper makes a breakthrough which leads the team to where Det. Hall is being held.
