= Out Come the Wolves =

2024 Canadian film

- Promotional poster
- Directed by: Adam MacDonald
- Screenplay by: Enuka Okuma; Tyler Russell
- Story by: Joris Jarsky; Adam MacDonald; Enuka Okuma
- Produced by: Eric Birnberg; Candice Chow-How
- Starring: Missy Peregrym; Joris Jarsky; Damon Runyan
- Cinematography: Christian Bielz
- Edited by: Pamela Bayne
- Music by: Lee Malia
- Production companies: December Films; IFC Films; Shudder; High Park Entertainment
- Distributed by: levelFilm
- Release date: August 30, 2024
- Running time: 86 minutes
- Country: Canada
- Language: English
- Box office: $18,750

Out Come the Wolves is a 2024 Canadian horror thriller film directed by Adam MacDonald and scripted by Enuka Okuma from a story by MacDonald, Okuma and Joris Jarsky. It stars Missy Peregrym, Jarsky, and Damon Runyan. The story follows a group of friends whose camping trip turns into a nightmare when they are stalked by a pack of wolves in a remote forest.

The film was released by Altitude Film Entertainment, on August 30, 2024. The film received generally positive reviews from critics.

== Plot ==
Sophie and Nolan a Canadian couple, along with her old acquaintance, Kyle, a hunter, are spending their vacation in a cabin where Nolan will learn the basics of hunting. At once, it becomes clear that Kyle still has some feelings for Sophie because he confesses that his girlfriend had failed to join them, so there were only the three of them staying in a cabin.

Over time, the situation becomes tensed for all of them due to some provocative statements made about their past. It turns out that Sophie and Kyle had an affair once, and Nolan clearly feels that Kyle was not over it when the latter showed hostility to him because Nolan told him that he and Sophie were going to get married. The hunter gives lessons on handling weapons such as guns and bows but in a way that is full of menace.

The next day, Nolan and Kyle go hunting again and suddenly run into a ferocious wolf who bites Nolan badly. Although Kyle fights with the creature and succeeds, in a moment of panic and selfishness, he decides to leave bleeding Nolan to die. So, a clash between Sophie and Kyle becomes inevitable because one might think that she will be able to protect herself from the advances of her jealous ex-lover. Nevertheless, the plot goes the other way round because instead of confronting Kyle, Sophie and he start arguing and then decide to go back into the forest searching for Nolan. In no time, they come across the same wolves that seemed to develop a passion for human flesh.

== Cast ==
- Missy Peregrym as Sophie
- Joris Jarsky as Kyle
- Damon Runyan as Nolan

== Production ==
Principal photography on Out Come the Wolves began in 2023, with filming scheduled to take place in Dundas, Ontario, throughout May. While second-unit filming was completed in Red Deer, Alberta. The film was produced by High Park Entertainment and December Films, with Eric Birnberg, Thomas Walden, Todd Berger and Thomas Vencelides serving as producers.

The cinematography was handled by Christian Bielz, while the screenplay was written by Enuka Okuma from a story by Joris Jarsky, Adam MacDonald and Okuma.

== Release ==
In October 2020, it was announced that IFC Midnight had taken US rights and levelFilm has acquired Canadian rights. to distribute the film. The film was released by Altitude Film Entertainment through Shudder (streaming service) on August 30, 2024. It also had a commercial screening at Toronto's Scotiabank Theatre on August 31.

== Reception ==
Upon its release in mid-2024, Out Come the Wolves received positive reviews from critics and audiences. On the review aggregator website Rotten Tomatoes, 72% of 25 critics' reviews are positive, with an average rating of 6.4/10. Metacritic, which uses a weighted average, assigned the film a score of 68 out of 100, based on 4 critics, indicating "generally favorable" reviews.

Clint Worthington from RogerEbert.com gave the film 2/4 stars and wrote:

[S]hockingly, the front half with the humans is better than the warmed-over rehash of "The Grey" we get in the final 45 minutes. The performances are strong, but workmanlike; still, the actors chew into it with some relish, between Peregrym's Hilary Swank-like elan and Runyon carrying himself with the smarmy sincerity of Rob Heubel taking a dramatic role.

Shaina Weatherhead of Collider described Out Come the Wolves as an intense survival thriller despite its predictable love triangle. She also discussed its character-driven approach, noting the shift in the two male characters' emotions between jealousy and fear.
