= Pyewacket (familiar spirit) =

Reported by an alleged witch in 1644

Pyewacket was said to be one of the familiar spirits of a convicted witch accused by the claimed Witchfinder General Matthew Hopkins in March 1644 in the town of Manningtree, Essex, England. Hopkins claimed he spied on the witches as they held their meeting close by his house, and heard them mention the name of a local woman. She was arrested and deprived of sleep for four nights, at the end of which she confessed and called out the names of her familiars, describing the forms in which they should appear. They were:

- Holt, "who came in like a white kittling"
- Jarmara, "who came in like a fat Spaniel without any legs at all"
- Vinegar Tom, "who was like a long-legg'd greyhound, with a head like an Oxe"
- Sacke and Sugar, "like a black Rabbet"
- Newes, "like a Polecat"
- Elemanzer, Pyewacket, Peck in the Crown, Grizzel Greedigut, described as imps

"Immediately after this Witch confessed severall other Witches, from whom she had her Imps, and named to divers women where their marks were, the number of their Marks, and Imps, and Imps names, as Elemanzer, Pyewacket, Peckin the Crown, Grizzel, Greedigut, &c. which no mortall could invent;"

== In popular culture ==
In the Hollywood film Bell, Book and Candle (1958), Pyewacket is the name of the brown seal point Siamese cat / familiar of Gillian Holroyd, a witch played by Kim Novak. The film was adapted from a 1950 Broadway play that continues to be produced in community theatres.

In the 1967 children's novel Pyewacket, the title character and protagonist is an alley cat.

Fantasy author Dianne Sylvan's Shadow World series features a Wiccan character, Stella, whose cat is named Pyewacket after the film.

Pyewacket is a 2017 horror film.

Pyewackett (with two T's) is the name of a folk band that released several albums in the 1980s.

In Peter Swanson's Henry Kimball book series, Kimball's cat is named Pyewackett.

In Death at a Dive Bar, a mystery game by Hunt-a-Killer, the cats of a local woman described as a witch are named Pyewacket and Vinegar Tom.

Pyewacket is a Santa Cruz 70 ultralight sailing yacht owned by Roy E. Disney that set the monohull time record in the 1999 Transpac from Los Angeles to Honolulu.
