= Cybergeddon (film) =

- Screenplay by: Miles Chapman; Anthony E. Zuiker
- Directed by: Diego Velasco
- Starring: Missy Peregrym; Erfan Elias Edraki; Olivier Martinez
- Country of origin: United States
- Original language: English

Production
- Producers: Bill O'Dowd; Matthew Weinberg; Anthony E. Zuiker
- Cinematography: Samy Inayeh
- Running time: 89 minutes
- Budget: $6 million

Original release
- Network: Yahoo
- Release: September 25 – September 27, 2012

Cybergeddon is a nine-part cybercrime web series that was released between September 25 and September 27, 2012 by Yahoo! and was later made available as a film on Netflix. The film stars Missy Peregrym and Olivier Martinez.

== Production ==
Directed by Diego Velasco, written by Miles Chapman and created by Anthony E. Zuiker the web series/film stars Peregrym as an FBI agent trying to clear her name and Martinez as the villain.

On March 21, 2012, the Associated Press and Reuters reported that Zuiker would release the feature length film Cybergeddon in installments on Yahoo! the following fall. This was two months after Yahoo! announced the 20-webisode series Electric City by Tom Hanks. By July Norton was on board as a sponsor and provided real computer virus hacker code, which led to prominent exposure for Norton in the final production. At the time of production, the web series, which cost $6 million, was the most expensive ever produced, about triple the cost of the previous web series (Electric City).

== Distribution ==
Yahoo! released the film in over 25 countries and 10 languages in three installments per day for three consecutive days exclusively on the Yahoo! platform. After reaching an audience of over 25 million viewers in 25 countries online, the film was entered into a broadcast agreement for broadcast in Europe, Asia, the Middle East, Latin America, and Canada in April 2013.

The film was released on DVD on March 17, 2014. The film was made available on Netflix in June 2014. It is listed on Netflix as a film between 88 and 89 minutes long with a PG-13 rating.

== Reception ==
Reviews on the film were mixed. Mike Hale of The New York Times noted that the caliber of production was above that of contemporary regular network television film and on par with Syfy and USA Network productions. Alasdair Wilkins of The A.V. Club posted a very negative review, describing the film as "deeply stupid". However, at the 3rd Streamy Awards, Peregrym won Best Female Performance – Drama, and the series had three other nominations. Zuiker went on to win an International Digital Emmy Award Pioneer Prize for his efforts at connecting Silicon Valley and Hollywood in what was at the time considered a groundbreaking production. The film was part of a critically successful year for Yahoo! video productions.
