= Charlotte Sullivan =

Canadian actress (born 1983)

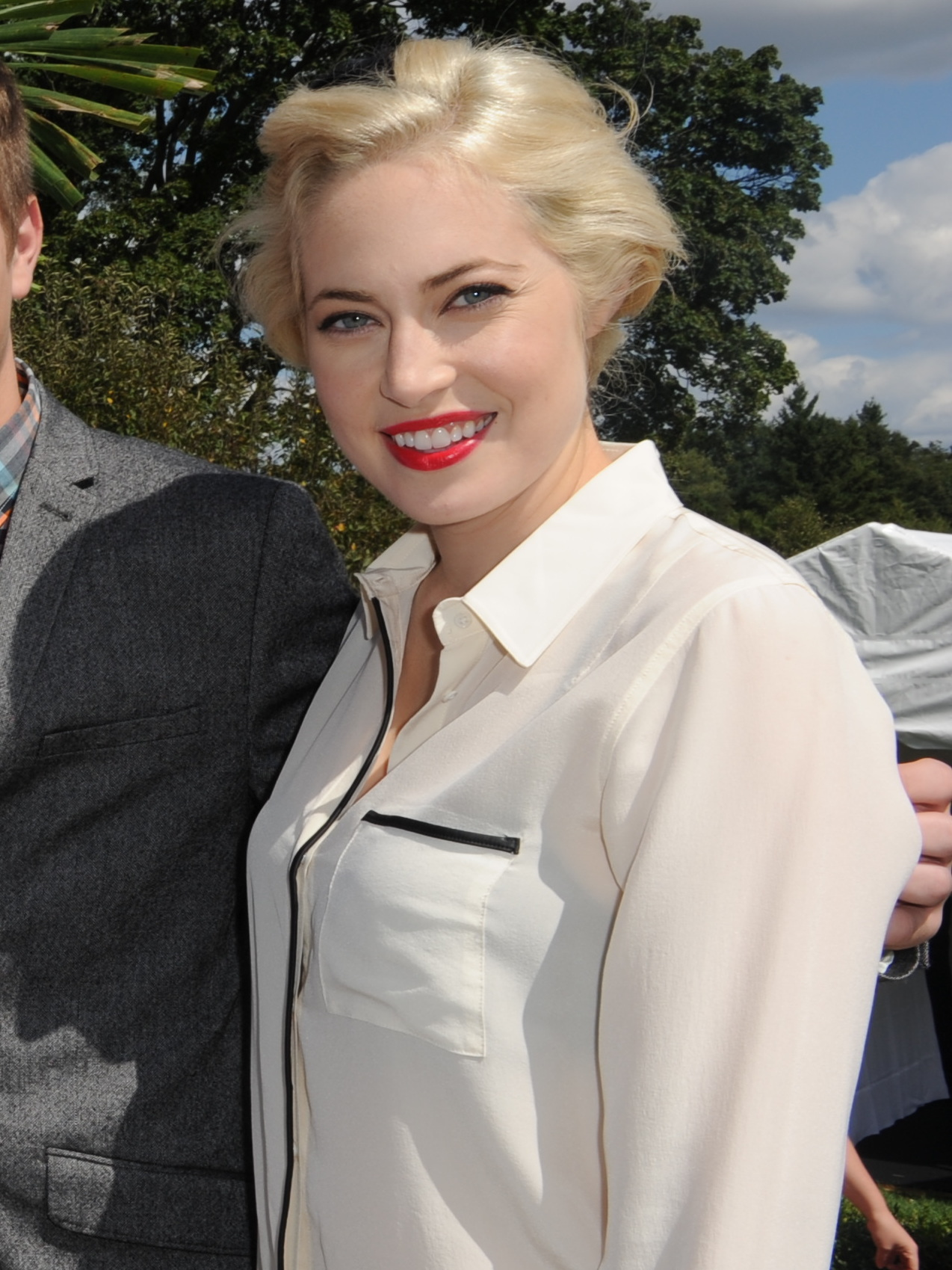
- Sullivan in 2012
- Born: October 21, 1983 (age 42); Toronto, Ontario, Canada
- Occupation: Actress
- Years active: 1996–present
- Spouse: Peter Stebbings (m. 2010)
- Children: 1

Charlotte Sullivan (born October 21, 1983) is a Canadian actress. Her credits include Harriet the Spy (1996), Goosebumps (1996), The New Ghostwriter Mysteries (1997), How to Deal (2003), Fever Pitch (2005), MVP (2008), The Cry of the Owl (2009), Rookie Blue (2010), The Kennedys (2011), The Colony (2013), Chicago Fire (2016–2017), Mary Kills People (2017–2019), Caught (2018), Wynonna Earp (2021), Law & Order: Organized Crime (2021), and Pretty Hard Cases (2022).

== Career ==
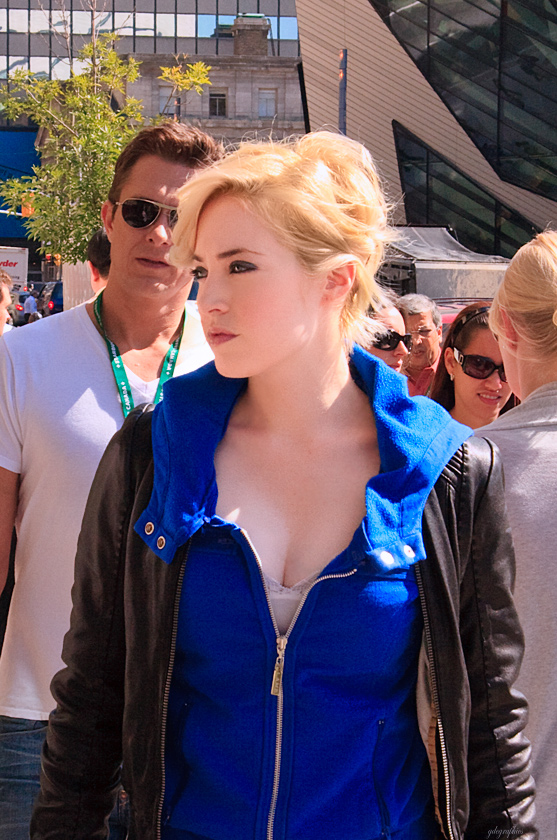
Sullivan at the 2009 Toronto International Film Festival

Sullivan began acting professionally as a child. Her first on-screen role was an extra in a Liza Minnelli music video. She has had starring roles in the film Harriet the Spy (1996) and the CBS series The New Ghostwriter Mysteries (1997), as well as smaller parts in the films How to Deal (2003) and Fever Pitch (2005). Sullivan played Katie in the drama television series Across the River to Motor City (2007). In 2008, Sullivan had a guest role as Maxima in the eighth season of Smallville.

In 2010, Sullivan began portraying Officer Gail Peck in the police drama series Rookie Blue, which aired on Global in Canada and on ABC in the United States. In 2011, Sullivan appeared as Marilyn Monroe in the Canadian-American miniseries The Kennedys. She was nominated for a Canadian Screen Award for Best Supporting Actress for her role in the 2011 film Citizen Gangster.

In early 2021, Sullivan was cast as Detective Gina Cappelletti in the NBC series Law & Order: Organized Crime.

In March 2024, Sullivan was cast as Jessica Blake in the CBS series FBI, reuniting with her Rookie Blue co-star Missy Peregrym.

== Personal life ==
Sullivan was born in Toronto, Ontario. Sullivan is married to Peter Stebbings, with whom she has one daughter (born 2015).

== Filmography ==
=== Film ===
Year	Title	Role	Notes
1995	Harm's Way	Gail	Short film
1996	Harriet the Spy	Marion Hawthorne	
1996	The Legend of Gator Face	Angel	
1998	Shadow Builder	Jazz	
2003	How to Deal	Elizabeth Gunderson	
2005	Fever Pitch	Spin Instructor	
2006	Population 436	Courtney Lovett	Direct to video
2009	The Cry of the Owl	Sally Nielson	
2009	Defendor	Fay Poppington	
2011	Citizen Gangster	Mary Mitchell	
2011	388 Arletta Avenue	Sherry	
2012	The Last Will and Testament of Rosalind Leigh	Anna / Radio Announcer	
2013	The Colony	Kai	
2016	Mr Write	Dori	
2017	Radius	Jane	

=== Television ===
Year	Title	Role	Notes
1996	Goosebumps	Courtney	Episode: "You Can't Scare Me!"
1996	Kung Fu: The Legend Continues	Linda	Episode: "A Shaolin Christmas"
1996	The Pathfinder	May	Television film
1997	When Innocence Is Lost	Annie French	Television film
1997	The New Ghostwriter Mysteries	Camella Gorik	Main role
1999	The Wrong Girl	Bridget Fisher	Television film
1999	The Famous Jett Jackson	Fuzzy Dupree	Episode: "Front Page"
1999	Are You Afraid of the Dark?	Diana	Episode: "The Tale of the Hunted"
1999	Mary Cassatt: An American Impressionist	Katherine Cassatt	Television film
2001	Lucky Girl	Janice	Television film
2001	Blue Murder	Katherine Dewson	Episode: "Family Man"
2003	Blue Murder	Amber Watley	Episode: "Respect"
2003	Platinum	Beth	
2003	Radio Free Roscoe	Judy Douglas	Episode: "Clark Kent"
2003	Beautiful Girl	Samantha Webb	Television film
2004–2005	This Is Wonderland	Beth	Episodes 1.3 & 2.7
2005	Terrorised by Teens: The Jonathan Wamback Story	Courtney	Television film
2005–2006	Puppets Who Kill	Sexy Wife, Sweetie	2 episodes
2006	The House Next Door	Pie Harrelson	Television film
2007	Across the River to Motor City	Katie Wilton	Main role
2008	Ny-Lon	N/A	Unsold television pilot
2008	MVP	Mandy	Recurring role
2008	Smallville	Maxima	Episode: "Instinct"
2008 & 2013	Murdoch Mysteries	Minerva Fairchild / Charlotte	2 episodes
2009	Unstable	Samantha Walker	Television film
2009	The Listener	Katie Stebbes	Episode: "Missing"
2009	Iron Road	Melanie Grant	Miniseries
2009	Alice	Duchess	Miniseries
2010–2015	Rookie Blue	Gail Peck	Main role
2011	The Kennedys	Marilyn Monroe	Episode: "Lancer and Lace"
2013	Blue Bloods	Lacey	Episode: "Devil's Breath"
2015	Saving Hope	Elizabeth Grant	2 episodes
2016–2017	Chicago Fire	Anna Turner	Recurring role
2017–2019	Mary Kills People	Nicole Mitchell	Recurring role
2018	Frankie Drake Mysteries	Meara Anderson	Episode: "The Pilot"
2018	Caught	Jennifer Baker	4 episodes
2019	Hudson & Rex	Leia Perkis	Episode: "Blind Justice"
2019	12 Pups of Christmas	Erin	Television film
2021	Wynonna Earp	Brigitte	Episode: "Old Souls"
2021	Two for the Win	Kayla	Television film
2021	Law & Order: Organized Crime	Detective Gina Cappelletti	Recurring role
2021	Coroner	Flora	2 episodes
2022	Pretty Hard Cases	Adeline French	Main role
2023	So Help Me Todd	Lindy Grant	Episode: "Against All Todds"
2024	FBI	Special Agent Jessica Blake	3 episodes
