= Pyewacket (film) =

- Theatrical release poster
- Directed by: Adam MacDonald
- Screenplay by: Adam MacDonald
- Produced by: Andrew Bronfman; Jonathan Bronfman; Lori Fischburg; Victoria Sanchez Mandryk; Jeff Sackman; Joe Sisto
- Starring: Laurie Holden; Nicole Muñoz
- Cinematography: Christian Bielz
- Edited by: Maureen Grant
- Music by: Lee Malia
- Production companies: JoBro Productions & Film Finance; Just Believe Productions
- Distributed by: Les Films Seville; Entertainment One
- Release dates: September 11, 2017 (TIFF); December 8, 2017 (Canada)
- Country: Canada
- Language: English
- Box office: $166,610

Pyewacket is a 2017 Canadian horror thriller film written and directed by Adam MacDonald. It stars Laurie Holden and Nicole Muñoz. It was screened in the Contemporary World Cinema section at the 2017 Toronto International Film Festival.

== Plot ==
Leah Reyes is a teenager fascinated with black magic and occult practices. Following the death of Leah's father, her grieving mother decides to move to a remote woodland house for a fresh start, forcing Leah to leave her school friends behind and join her. After a fierce argument with her mother, Leah wishes death on her and performs an occult ritual in the forest from one of her books, to summon the demon Pyewacket to kill her mother. However, Leah bonds with her mother shortly afterwards, and she soon regrets her actions.

She begins to notice strange occurrences, including noises coming from the attic and piles of dirt on the floors. One night, Pyewacket appears as a shadowy entity in Leah's bedroom while she sleeps, and drags her into the forest. Waking up the next day covered in blood, Leah turns to her school friends for help, and her best friend Janice agrees to stay at Leah's house overnight to help her lift the curse. However, the following morning Leah and her mother find Janice cowering in the car, too terrified to say what happened to her. Leah contacts paranormalist Rowan Dove, who advises that the only way to stop the demon is to perform the same summoning ritual in the same place, but in reverse. He also warns that Pyewacket is a devious shape-shifter and Leah must not trust anyone until the curse is lifted.

Leah returns to the forest and begins the reverse ritual, but stops when she sees her mother lying dead nearby, but also hears her mother calling out for her. In a panic, Leah calls 911, and then her friend Aaron to pick her up. Returning to the house, Leah is confronted by Pyewacket, who first takes the form of Leah's mother, then of a monstrous hag. Leah hides in the attic, and when her mother returns home, Leah is convinced that she is another of Pyewacket's illusions, so that night she douses her mother with gasoline and sets her on fire, believing that she is killing the demon. This in turn sets the house on fire, and when Aaron arrives he finds Leah unconscious outside as the house burns down.

Leah is interviewed by a police detective about her mother's death. After playing a recording of Leah's 911 call where she said her mother's body was in the woods, the detective reveals that the only body the police found was a burned one in the ruins of the house.

== Cast ==
- Nicole Muñoz as Leah Reyes
- Laurie Holden as Mrs. Reyes
- Chloe Rose as Janice
- Eric Osborne as Aaron
- Romeo Carere as Rob
- James McGowan as Rowan Dove
- Bianca Melchior as Pyewacket

== Reception ==
On review aggregation website Rotten Tomatoes, the film holds an approval rating of 84% based on 32 reviews, and an average rating of 6.98/10. The website's critical consensus reads, "Pyewacket builds its atmospheric, patiently encroaching chills on a well-told story concerned more with emotional trauma than supernatural threats." Metacritic gives the film a weighted average score of 56 out of 100, based on 4 critics, indicating "mixed or average reviews".
