= Ben Bass (actor) =

American-Canadian actor

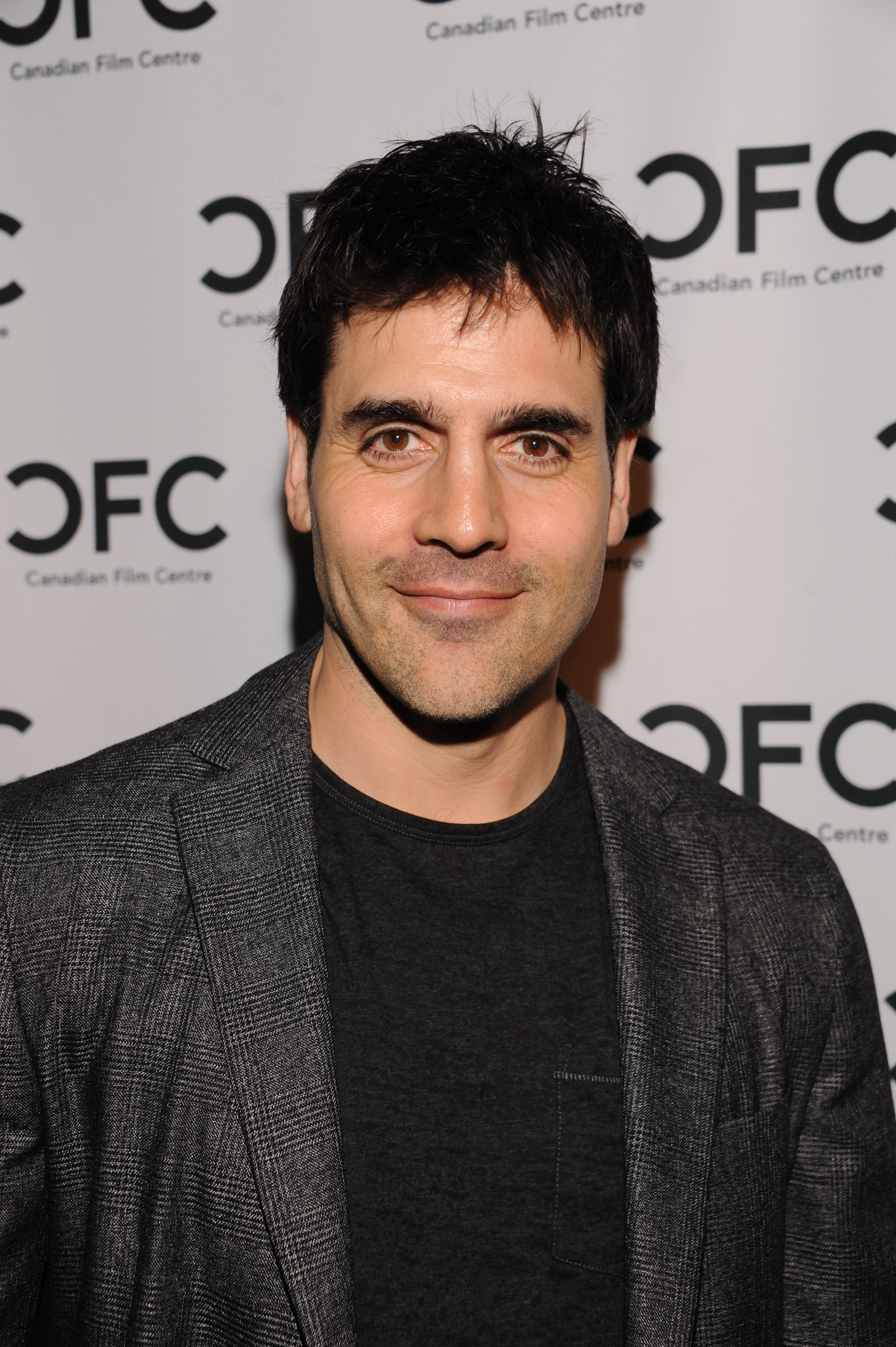
- Bass in 2012
- Born: August 14, 1968 (age 57)
- Occupation: Actor
- Years active: 1987–present
- Spouse: Laura Carswell (m. 2011)

Ben Bass (born August 14, 1968) is an American-Canadian actor. He is best known for his role as officer/detective Sam Swarek on the Global police television series Rookie Blue, which also aired on ABC.

== Life and career ==
At age 7, Bass moved with his family to Vancouver, British Columbia, Canada. He speaks French fluently.

He started his television career by appearing in the show 21 Jump Street, and started his stage career when he appeared in Angry Housewives. He was nominated for a Jessie Richardson Theatre Award for best supporting actor in Angry Housewives. Also, he originated the stage role of the young Elvis Presley in Are You Lonesome Tonight at The Charlottetown Festival in Prince Edward Island. Following that, he attended Theatre School at the London Academy of Music and Dramatic Art and L'École Internationale de Théâtre Jacques Lecoq in Paris. After returning to Canada, he appeared in television guest roles before becoming a regular cast member of the series Forever Knight as the 16th century Spanish vampire Javier Vachon.

He also appeared at the Stratford (Ontario) Festival as Christian in Cyrano de Bergerac and as the lead in In the Ring and also appeared as Petruchio in Taming of the Shrew at the Atlantic Theatre Festival in Nova Scotia.

Bass then played a lead character in season 3 of TV show The Eleventh Hour and was nominated for a Gemini Award for this role. He also starred in a TV miniseries Would Be Kings for which he received a second Gemini nomination. His next role as Sam Swarek in Rookie Blue garnered nominations for a Canadian Screen Award in 2014 and 2016. His film career includes A Cool, Dry Place, Bride of Chucky, and The 6th Day.

== Personal life ==
On June 14, 2011, he married actress Laura Carswell.

== Filmography ==
Year	Title	Role	Notes
1987	21 Jump Street	Leonard	1 episode
1987	Street Legal	New Mel	1 episode
1989	Bordertown	Trevor Andres	2 episodes
1992	A Killer Among Friends	Steve	TV movie
1995	Forever Knight	Javier Vachon	13 episodes
1998	A Cool, Dry Place	Placement Agent	
1998	Bride of Chucky	Lieutenant Ellis	
1998	Scandalous Me: The Jacqueline Susann Story	Rex Reed	TV movie
1999	Murder in a Small Town	Michael	TV movie
1999	Beggars and Choosers	Brian Peske	29 episodes
1999	Da Vinci's Inquest	Rick O'Malley (1999); Hardy's Lawyer (2001)	2 episodes
1999	Bonanno: A Godfather's Story		TV movie
1999	The Hunger	Dave	1 episode
2000	First Wave	Russ	1 episode
2000	Honey, I Shrunk the Kids: The TV Show	ND-3 Controller	1 episode
2000	Hollywood Off-Ramp	1 episode	
2000	Stargate SG-1	Dr. Steven Rayner	1 episode
2000	The 6th Day	Bodyguard	
2000	Big Sound	Darryl	8 episodes
2001	Strange Frequency	Tom West	TV movie; Segment: Room Service
2001	The Lone Gunmen	Josh Gillnitz	1 episode
2001	Night Visions	Paul	1 episode
2002	Jeremiah	Rasmussen	1 episode
2002	Monk	Gavin Lloyd	2 episodes
2002	Tom Stone	Graham Pearson	7 episodes
2003	The Twilight Zone	Trevor Black	1 episode
2003	Bliss	Marcus	1 episode
2003	Dead Like Me	Chris Freedman	1 episode
2004	The Chris Isaak Show	Ben	1 episode
2004	The Love Crimes of Gillian Guess	Peter Gill	TV movie
2004	The Eleventh Hour	Henry Shelley	13 episodes
2005	Queer as Folk	Tad	2 episodes
2006	Last Exit	David	TV movie
2007	Law & Order	Dr. Adam Vaughn	1 episode
2008	Would Be Kings	Jamie Collins	TV mini-series
2008	Flashpoint	Harlan Geddes	1 episode
2008	Dream	Man	Short
2010–2015	Rookie Blue	Officer/Detective Sam Swarek	Series Regular - Starring Role
2014	The Good Sister	Jack	TV movie
2015	Love's Complicated	Cinco Dublin	TV movie
2016	Casual	Harry	2 episodes
2017	Saving Hope	Doug Reid	1 episode
2018	The Detail	Marc Savage	5 episodes
2020	Burden of Truth	Dr. Solomon Stone/Solomon Stafford	3 episodes
2022	Pretty Hard Cases	DS Brad Michaels	Season 2

== Awards ==
Year	Award	Category	Work nominated	Result	Ref
2005	Gemini Award	Best Performance by an Actor in a Continuing Leading Dramatic Role	The Eleventh Hour	Nominated	
2008	Gemini Award	Best Performance by an Actor in a Leading Role in a Dramatic Program or Mini-Series	Would Be Kings	Nominated	
2014	Canadian Screen Awards	Best Performance by an Actor in a Continuing Leading Dramatic Role	Rookie Blue	Nominated	
2016	Canadian Screen Awards	Best Performance by an Actor in a Continuing Leading Dramatic Role	Rookie Blue	Nominated	
