= Gregory Smith (actor) =

Canadian actor and director

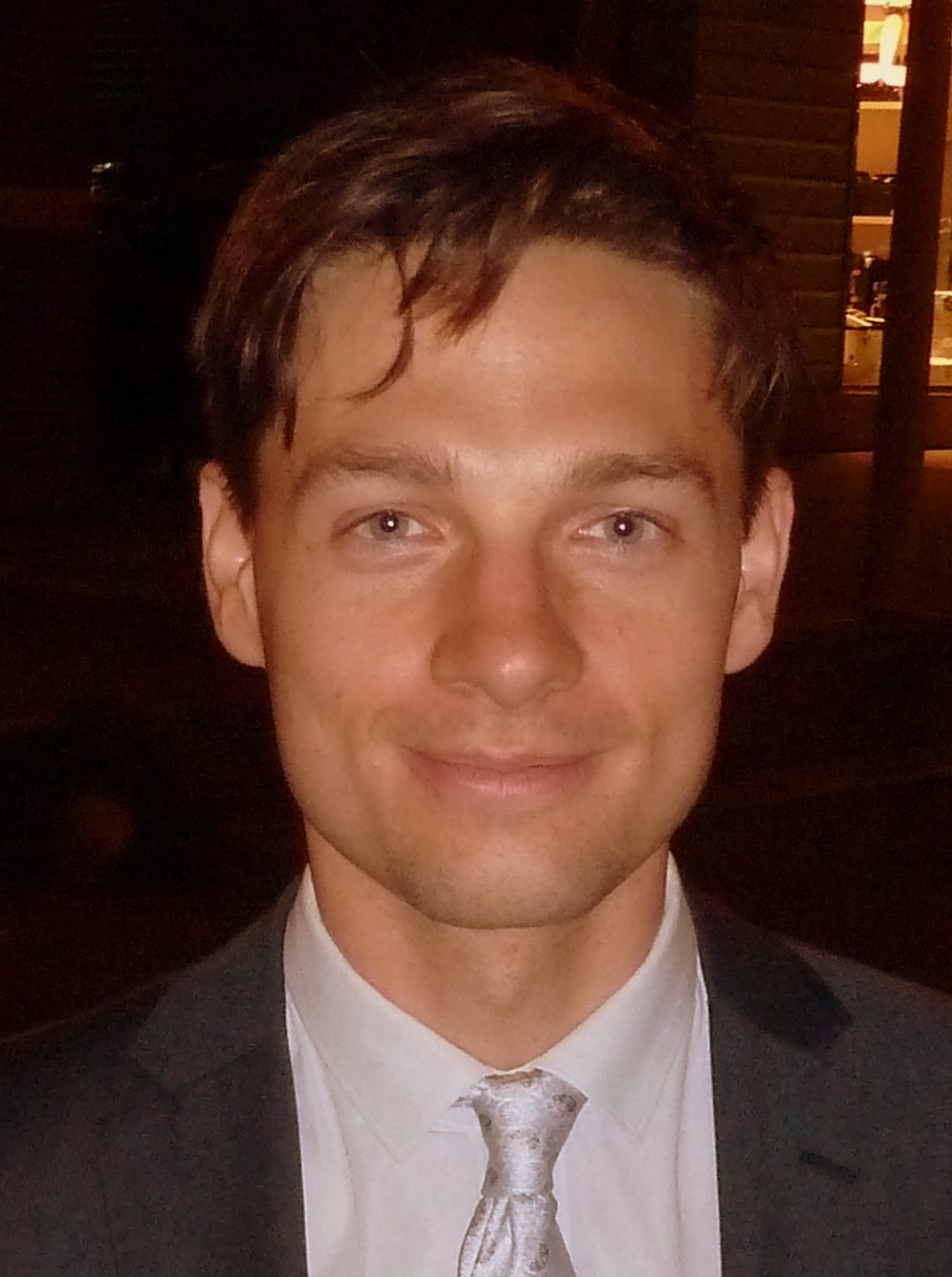
- Smith at the 2012 Toronto International Film Festival
- Born: Gregory Edward Smith; July 6, 1983 (age 43); Toronto, Ontario, Canada
- Citizenship: Canadian; American
- Occupations: Actor; director
- Years active: 1991–present
- Spouse: Taylor McKay (m. 2018)
- Children: 2
- Relatives: Douglas Smith (brother)

Gregory Edward Smith (born July 6, 1983) is a Canadian and American actor and director. Smith has appeared in several Hollywood films, and is known for his roles as Alan Abernathy in Small Soldiers, Ephram Brown on The WB television series Everwood, and Dov Epstein on the Global police drama series Rookie Blue.

== Early life ==
Smith was born in Toronto, Ontario, the son of Terrea (née Oster), a teacher from the United States, and Maurice Smith, a producer of low-budget films originally from the United Kingdom. Smith's mother appeared in several of the films that his father produced during the 1980s. Smith has two brothers, including fellow actor Douglas Smith, and a sister.

== Career ==
Smith began acting when he was fourteen months old, and appeared in a Tide television commercial and in store catalogues. After a role in the 1994 children's film Andre, he starred in the 1995 direct-to-video release Leapin' Leprechauns! and its 1996 sequel, Spellbreaker: Secret of the Leprechauns. Also in 1996, Smith appeared opposite Michelle Trachtenberg in Harriet the Spy.

Smith subsequently starred in another direct-to-video film, Shadow Zone: My Teacher Ate My Homework, and appeared in three 1998 films: Krippendorf's Tribe, playing one of the children of the title character, The Climb, a drama also starring John Hurt, and the film Small Soldiers, in which Smith had a lead role opposite Kirsten Dunst, and for which he won a Young Artist Award for Best Performance in a Feature Film Leading Young Actor in 1999.

During the 2000s, Smith appeared in The Patriot (2000), played outlaw Jim Younger in the western American Outlaws (2001), was featured in the short-lived 2001 CBS drama series Kate Brasher, and was cast in a lead role on the WB show Everwood, which became a success and ran from 2002 until June 2006. His role on the show was described by The Independent Weekly as "one of the best portrayals of a thoughtful, alienated teenager on television". For this role, Smith won a Young Artist Award for Best Performance in a TV series (Comedy or Drama) Leading Young Actor in 2003. During Everwood's filming, Smith owned a home on location in Park City, Utah.

In 2005, Smith appeared in the comedy-drama film Kids in America, which had a regional release in the U.S. During the film, Smith shared the longest on-screen kiss with Stephanie Sherrin, timed at almost six minutes. He also played in Zenon (Girl of the 21st Century) as Greg.

Smith next appeared in the independent film drama Nearing Grace, which received a limited theatrical release on October 13, 2006; in the film he plays Henry Nearing, a high senior in the 1970s. The News & Observer's review of the film described Smith's character as "self-deluded" and "perpetually brow-furrowing", although The Seattle Times noted that Smith was "likable", and HeraldNet's review specified that a "better movie will make [Smith] a star".

In 2007, Smith had a small role in The Seeker: The Dark is Rising as Max Stanton. Smith next appeared in the Richard Attenborough–directed period romance Closing the Ring, playing a younger version of Christopher Plummer's character young Jack, as well as in the thriller Boot Camp.

In 2008, Smith produced the direct release-to-DVD film Wieners and made a guest appearance on the series Eli Stone. Smith returned to TV in the series Rookie Blue as Officer Dov Epstein. The series premiered on both ABC and Global TV in Canada on June 24, 2010. Making his television directing debut, he also directed five episodes.

On March 18, 2010, he was cast by Jim Sheridan for his 2011 thriller film Dream House; the movie was shot in Toronto.

He played Slick, the sadistic psychopath, in the 2011 independent film Hobo with a Shotgun.

== Personal life ==
On August 18, 2018, Smith married Canadian actress and model Taylor McKay. The couple have two children, a boy born in 2021 and a girl born in 2022.

== Filmography ==
=== Film ===
Year	Title	Role	Notes
1994	Andre	Bobby	
1995	Leapin' Leprechauns!	Mikey Dennehy	
1996	Big Bully	Kid #2	
1996	Harriet the Spy	Simon "Sport"	
1996	Spellbreaker: Secret of the Leprechauns	Mikey Dennehy	
1997	The Climb	Danny Himes	
1997	Shadow Zone: My Teacher Ate My Homework	Jesse Hackett	
1998	Krippendorf's Tribe	Mickey	
1998	Small Soldiers	Alan Abernathy	
2000	The Patriot	Thomas Martin	
2001	American Outlaws	Jim Younger	
2004	Book of Love	Chet Becker	
2005	Kids in America	Holden Donovan	
2005	Nearing Grace	Henry Nearing	
2007	Closing the Ring	Young Jack	
2007	The Seeker	Max Stanton	
2008	Boot Camp	Ben	
2008	Edison and Leo	Leo (voice)	
2009	Leslie, My Name Is Evil	Perry	
2010	Whirligig		
2011	Conception	Will	
2011	Dream House	Artie	
2011	Hobo with a Shotgun	Slick	
2011	In My Pocket	Stephen	

=== Television ===
Year	Title	Role	Notes
1991	The Commish	Jason	"Nothing to Fear But Fear..."
1991	Street Justice	Joey	"Kid Stuff"
1992	The Hat Squad	Brian	"Pilot"
1992	Jumpin' Joe	Joe Dugan Jr.	TV film
1993	Street Justice	Joey	"A Sense of Duty"
1994	Highlander: The Series	Kid	"Under Colour of Authority"
1994	Mega Man: Upon a Star	Mega Man	"Appearance in Japan"
1995	The Adventures of Captain Zoom in Outer Space	Baley	TV film
1995	Are You Afraid of the Dark?	Tim Williamson	"The Tale of Train Magic"
1995	The Other Mother: A Moment of Truth Movie	Kip Schaeffer	TV film
1995	The Outer Limits	Young Paul	"Dark Matters"
1997	M.A.N.T.I.S.	Boy	"Ancestral Evil"
1997	Meego	Gordon	"Halloween"
1999	Zenon: Girl of the 21st Century	Greg	TV film
2001	Just Ask My Children	Brian Kniffen (age 16–18)	TV film
2001	Kate Brasher	Daniel Brasher	Main role
2001	Touched by an Angel	Patrick Lewis	"A Winter Carol"
2002–2006	Everwood	Ephram Brown	Main role
2003	A Wrinkle in Time	Calvin O'Keefe	TV film
2009	Eli Stone	Todd Riley	"Flight Path"
2009	Guns	Bobby	Miniseries
2010	Blue Belle	Jackson	
2010	Fakers	Nik Iliakis	TV film
2010–2015	Rookie Blue	Dov Epstein	Main role Nominated – Golden Maple Award for Newcomer of the year in a TV series broadcast in the U.S. (2016)
2013	Franklin & Bash	Coach Kasso	"Control"
2014	Working the Engels	Jonny	"The Book Club", "Jenna vs. Big Pastry Parts 1 & 2"
2017	Designated Survivor	Will Griffin	"Two Ships"
2024	Superman & Lois	First AD	"A Regular Guy"

=== Director ===
Year	Title	Episode
2012	Rookie Blue	"The Rules" (S3, E11)
2013	Rookie Blue	"Under Fire" (S4, 12)
2013	Method	Short
2014	Rookie Blue	"Heart Breakers, Money Makers" (S5, E3)
2014	Saving Hope	"En Bloc" (S2, E11)
2015	Arrow	"Nanda Parbat" (S3, E15)
2015	Rookie Blue	"Uprising" (S6, E3) & "Home Run" (S6, E6)
2015	Saving Hope	"Trading Places" (S3, E14), "Fearless" (S3, E17) & "Emotional Rescue" (S4, E10)
2016	Arrow	"Taken" (S4, E15), "Genesis" (S4, E20) & "A Matter of Trust" (S5, E3)
2016	Legends of Tomorrow	"Marooned" (S1, E7), "Leviathan" (S1, E13) & "Invasion!" (S2, E7)
2016	Saving Hope	"Not Fade Away" (S4, E15)
2017	Arrow	"Who Are You" (S5, E10) & "Reversal" (S6, E4)
2017	The Flash	"Into the Speed Force" (S3, E16)
2017	Legends of Tomorrow	"Crisis on Earth X, Part 4"
2017	Saving Hope	"Birthday Blues" (S5, E3), "Tested and Tried" (S5, E5) & "Gutted" (S5, E7)
2017	Shadowhunters	"Parabatai Lost" (S2, E3)
2018	The Detail	"Pilot" (S1, E1) & "Off The Path" (S1, E10)
2018	The Flash	"Enter Flashtime" (S4, E15)
2018	Legends of Tomorrow	"The Virgin Gary" (S4, E1)
2018	Riverdale	"Chapter Thirty-Three: Shadow of a Doubt" (S2, E20)
2018	Supergirl	"Fort Rozz" (S3, E11)
2019	Arrow	"Star City Slayer" (S7, E13)
2019	God Friended Me	"Que Sera Sera" (S1, E20)
2019	The Flash	"Legacy" (S5, E22) & "Into the Void" (S6, E1)
2019	Riverdale	"Chapter Forty-Six: The Red Dahlia" (S3, E11) & "Chapter Sixty: "Dog Day Afternoon" (S4, E3)
2019	Unspeakable	"Contraction" (E2), "Heat-Treatment" (E3) & "Unsafe" (E4)
2020	God Friended Me	"Almost Famous" (S2, E18)
2020	Katy Keene	"Chapter Seven: Kiss of the Spider Woman" (S1, E7)
2020	Legends of Tomorrow	"Crisis on Infinite Earths: Part Five" (S5, E1)
2020	Supergirl	"The Bodyguard" (S6, E14)
2021	Superman & Lois	"The Perks of Not Being a Wallflower" (S1, E3) & "A Brief Reminiscence In-Between Cataclysmic Events" (S1, E11)
2022	Superman & Lois	"What Lies Beneath" (S2, E1), "The Thing in the Mines" (S2, E3), "Into Oblivion" (S2, E8) & "Waiting for Superman" (S2, E15)
2023	Superman & Lois	"In Cold Blood" (S3, E3), "Guess Who's Coming to Dinner" (S3, E8) & "What Kills You Only Makes You Stronger" (S3, E13)
2023	Riverdale	"Chapter One Hundred Thirty-Five: For A Better Tomorrow" (S7, E18)
2024	Superman & Lois	"The End & The Beginning" (S4, E1), "A Perfectly Good Wedding" (S4, E4), "A Regular Guy" (S4, E7) & "It Went By So Fast" (S4, E10)
2025	Will Trent	"Breathe with Me" (S3, E5)
2026	Brilliant Minds	"The Rabbit Hole" (S2, E13)
