= Aliyah O'Brien =

Canadian actress (born 1981)

- Born: May 7, 1981 (age 45); Victoria, British Columbia
- Other name: Aaliyah O'Brien
- Occupation: Actor
- Years active: 2007–present
- Height: 5 ft 9 in (1.75 m)
- Website: www.aliyahobrien.com

Aliyah O'Brien (born May 7, 1981) is a Canadian actress, best known for her television roles in the TV series Rookie Blue and Bates Motel and in the film Maximum Conviction.

== Biography ==
Aliyah O'Brien was born in Victoria, British Columbia, and is of Irish, Spanish, and Welsh descent. She was actively involved in musical theatre while a student at Spectrum Secondary School. Her interest in kinesiology, however, led her to study it while attending Camosun College and landed her work as a personal trainer at Club Phoenix and the University of Victoria. Since graduation, she has traveled to 32 countries and describes herself as an "adrenaline junkie".

== Filmography ==
=== Film ===
Year	Title	Role	Notes
2008	That One Night	Stephanie	
2008	Kill Switch	Judith	Video
2012	Maximum Conviction	Charlotte	
2013	The Woods}	Ally	
2013	The Perfect Cup	Tika	Short film
2014	If I Stay	Female EMT	
2014	Preggoland	Nurse Lisa	
2014	Citizen Jane	Private Toni Miles	Short film
2015	Tomorrowland	Functionary	
2015	The Starlight Heist	Domino	Short film
2016	Monster Trucks	Junior Scientist	

=== Television ===
Year	Title	Role	Notes
2007	Intelligence	Kandy	Episode: "A Man Escapes"
2008	Psych	Wilde	Episode: "Talk Derby to Me"
2009	Exes and Ohs	Nola	Episode: "Fish in a Barrel"
2010	The Actress Diaries	Nikki Evans	Episode: "Pilot"
2010	Men with Brooms	Tannis	12 episodes
2011	Bringing Ashley Home	Marquita	Television film
2011	Smallville	Kamira	Episode: "Dominion"
2011	Sanctuary	Afina	Episode: "Awakening"
2012	Supernatural	Gloria Jane	Episode: "There Will Be Blood"
2012	A Killer Among Us	Ruthie Webber	Television film
2013	Soldiers of the Apocalypse	Doubles	10 episodes
2013	Stonados	Alicia	Television film
2013–2016	Bates Motel	Regina Wall	8 episodes
2013–2014	Rookie Blue	Holly Stewart	12 episodes
2014	Ascension	Eva Marceau	3 episodes
2014	Continuum	Alyssa	Episode: "30 Minutes to Air"
2014	Motive	Grace Dinard	Episode: "For You I Die"
2015	School of Fish	Mina	
2015	Ice Sculpture Christmas	Brooke	Television film
2016	Finding Father Christmas	Ellie Whitcomb	Television film
2016	Garage Sale Mystery: Guilty Until Proven Innocent	Kimberly Collette Balmain	Television film
2016	Tulips in Spring	Violet	Television film
2017	Engaging Father Christmas	Ellie Whitcomb	Television film
2018	Take Two	Detective Christine Rollins	Main cast 13 episodes
2019	Supernatural	Lorna	Episode: "Last Call"
2020	Hudson & Rex	Leah Mueller	Episode: "Fanning the Flames"
2021	Legends of Tomorrow	Kayla	6 episodes
2023	Family Law	Kelly Garcia	Recurring
