= Pyewacket (novel) =

1967 children's novel

- Author: Rosemary Weir
- Language: English
- Publication date: 1967

Pyewacket is a children's novel written by Rosemary Weir and illustrated by Charles Pickard. First published in 1967, the narrative centers on the demolition of a series of row houses from the viewpoint(s) of Pyewacket, a resilient alley cat, and his friends, who stay on the property and adapt to a new life.

== Reception ==
In a positive review, Richard Lockridge of The New York Times called the book "ingenious, well-plotted and pretty funny". Finding the novel to be "a most amusing story", the Redwood City Tribune's Pat Martin praised Charles Pickard's illustrations and Weir's "very fine characterization" of the cat. The book was reviewed by Kirkus Reviews.

Writing for the Fort Worth Star-Telegram, Virginia Van Fleet called the book's conclusion "a most ingenious and satisfying solution". In a negative review, The Guardian book critic Edward Blishen said that although he liked fantasy stories and cat tales, the book was "heavy and calculated" and he discovered himself "being bumped gloomily along the ground".

== Sequel ==
Weir wrote Pyewacket and Son, another story about Pyewacket, in 1980.
