= Adam MacDonald =

Canadian actor and film director (born 1977)

William Adam MacDonald
- Born: William Adam MacDonald; April 26, 1977 (age 49); Montreal, Quebec, Canada
- Occupations: Actor, writer, director
- Years active: 1998–present
- Relatives: Jeff Roop (cousin)

William Adam MacDonald (born April 26, 1977) is a Canadian actor, writer, and director. He is known for portraying Josh MacIntosh on the CBC show Being Erica, Peter McGregor on Wild Roses, and Detective Steve Peck on Rookie Blue, and for his guest-starring roles in several other shows, including Murdoch Mysteries and Republic of Doyle.

MacDonald's writing and directing work includes the horror films Backcountry (2014) and Pyewacket (2017), both of which premiered at the Toronto International Film Festival, and the third season of the anthology horror television series Slasher (2019).

== Life and career ==
MacDonald was born and raised in Montreal, and dabbled in acting and music throughout high school. He began to take it seriously in 1997 at the age of 20, when he became "hooked" after participating in an acting class.

MacDonald has starred in several television series throughout his career, in both leading and guest roles. He is known for portraying Josh MacIntosh on the CBC show Being Erica, Peter McGregor on Wild Roses, and Detective Steve Peck on Rookie Blue, and for his guest-starring roles in several other shows, including Murdoch Mysteries and Republic of Doyle. He also starred as Nick McAllister on the short-lived supernatural show Vampire High.

After building a career on screen, MacDonald began writing and directing short films. He struggled to make the move from short films to a feature.

In 2014, MacDonald made his feature film directorial debut with the 2014 nature–survival horror Backcountry. Starring Missy Peregrym, the film is based on the true story of a hungry man-eating bear that attacked Mark Jordan and Jacqueline Perry, in the back country of Missinaibi Lake Provincial Park, North of Chapleau, Ontario in 2005. Production took place in late 2013 with funding from Telefilm Canada and Northern Ontario Heritage Fund. The film premiered at the 2014 Toronto International Film Festival, and received generally positive reviews from critics upon release.

In 2016, MacDonald directed his second feature film, Pyewacket, an occult horror film starring Laurie Holden. The film, which he also wrote, screened in the Contemporary World Cinema section at the 2017 Toronto International Film Festival. It received mixed reviews from critics.

In 2019, MacDonald directed the entire third season of the Netflix anthology horror series, Slasher, titled Solstice. In 2020, it was announced that he will direct the fourth season, titled Flesh & Blood, as well.

MacDonald has expressed his desire to complete a trilogy of feature films featuring women overcoming extreme circumstances, beginning with Backcountry. In 2020, IFC acquired the right to MacDonald's script title Out Come the Wolves, also starring Peregrym.

== Filmography ==
=== Film ===
Year	Title	Director	Writer	Producer
2014	Backcountry	Yes	Yes	No
2017	Pyewacket	Yes	Yes	No
2023	Out Come the Wolves	Yes	Story	Executive
2025	This Is Not a Test	Yes	Yes	Yes

Acting roles

Year	Title	Role	Notes
1998	Going to Kansas City	Floyd Weaver	
1999	Running Home	Jay Torpy	
2004	Confessions of a Teenage Drama Queen	Steve	
2005	A Stranger Here Myself	Conan	Short film
2006	Jekyll + Hyde	Josh Enfield	Straight-to-DVD
2007	14 Days in Paradise	Houston	
2007	Final Draft	Jack	
2010	Love Letter from an Open Grave	Ray	Short film
2012	Home Sweet Home	Frank	
2014	Wolves	Marty	
2023	Thanksgiving	John Carver	Voice

=== Television ===
Year	Title	Director	Writer	Executive Producer	Notes
2019-2023	Slasher	Yes	No	Yes	Directed 24 episodes
2021-2023	The Haunted Museum	Yes	Yes	No	Directed 1 episdoe, wrote 3 episodes
2022	Urban Legend	No	Yes	No	Episode "The Scuba Diver"
2025	Hell Motel	Yes	No	Yes	Miniseries

Acting roles

Year	Title	Role	Notes
1998	The Mystery Files of Shelby Woo	Danny Dabowski	Episode: "The Yearbook Mystery" {Stewart Finol}
1999	Misguided Angels	Brandon Dean	Episode: "Son for the Road"
1999	Big Wolf on Campus	Butch Jenkins	Episodes: "Butch Comes to Shove", "Butch Is Back"
1999	Are You Afraid of the Dark?	Eddy West / Bulldog	Episodes: "The Tale of the Misfortune Cookie", "The Tale of Highway 13"
2000	Nuremberg	American Guard	Television miniseries
2000	The Audrey Hepburn Story	Nick Dana	Television movie
2000	Satan's School for Girls	Blake	Television movie
2001	Leap Years	Tom Greenway	Episodes: 1.19, 1.20
2001	Mutant X	Renfield	Episode: "Kilohertz"
2001	Snow in August	Frankie McCarthy	Television movie
2001	Hysteria – The Def Leppard Story	Rick Savage	Television movie
2001	Vampire High	Nick McAllister	Recurring role, 12 episodes
2002	The Associates	Lyle Thomlin	Episode: "Walking the Line"
2003	1-800-Missing	Doug	Recurring role, 7 Episodes
2004	Love Rules!	Brian	Television movie
2005	Beach Girls	Marty Alba	Limited television series, main role, 6 episodes
2007	No Brother of Mine	Drew Brampton	Television movie
2008	Victor	Dave Kolisnik	Television movie
2008	Mayerthorpe	Constable Peter Schiemann	Television movie
2009	Wild Roses	Peter McGregor	Main role, 13 episodes
2009	ZOS: Zone of Separation	Medic DeFranco	TV miniseries, 3 episodes
2009	Being Erica	Josh MacIntosh	Recurring role, 27 episodes
2010	Living in Your Car	Dave	Episodes: 1.6, 1.7
2010	Rookie Blue	Detective Steve Peck	Recurring role (seasons 1–4), main role (seasons 5 & 6)
2011	Murdoch Mysteries	Bert Howland	Episode: "Dead End Street"
2012	Republic of Doyle	Roger	Episode: "The Dating Game"
2012	Flashpoint	Erik	Episode: "Eyes In"
2012	Transporter: The Series	Thierry Lefebre	Episodes: "Hot Ice", "City of Love"
2020	Tribal	Lucas Fielding	Series regular

=== Video game ===
Year	Title	Role
2011	Warriors: Legends of Troy	Soldier #5/Male Civilian 1
