= Travis Milne =

Canadian actor (born 1986)

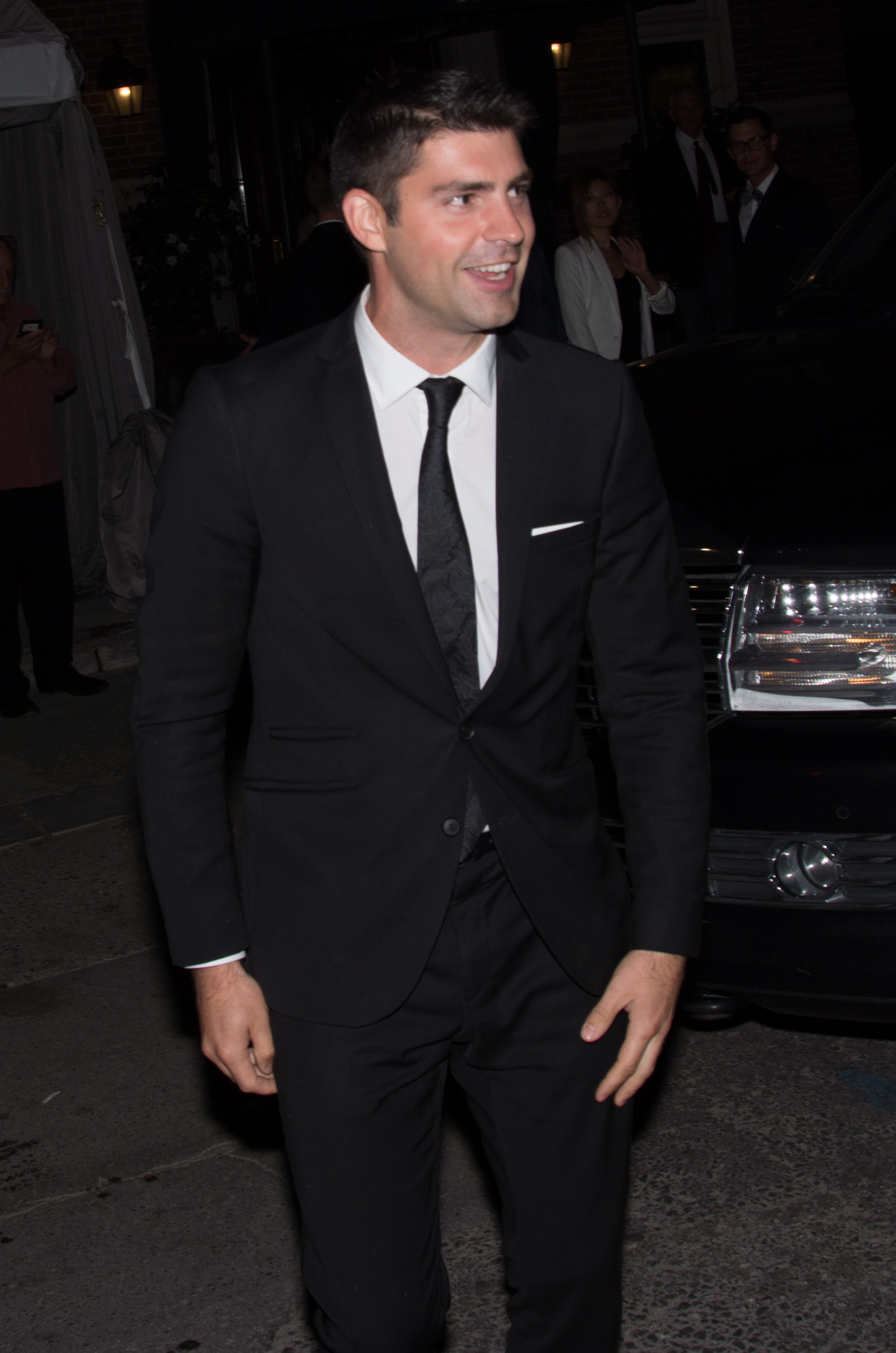
- Milne at the 2014 Toronto International Film Festival
- Born: July 18, 1986 (age 39); Lac La Biche, Alberta, Canada
- Occupation: Actor
- Years active: 2005–present

Travis Milne (born July 18, 1986) is a Canadian actor, best known for portraying Officer Chris Diaz in the drama series Rookie Blue.

== Life and career ==
Milne is from Lac La Biche, Alberta. He was a student in J.A.Williams High School, in Lac La Biche. He was convinced by his drama teacher to pursue a career in acting. Once he pursued this career, he fell in love with acting and found an agent in Calgary, Alberta.

After starring in a few short films Milne was cast in 2007 as a co-host of My Green House, a television series on the environmentally friendly lifestyle. My Green House was shown on CTV Two Alberta and on Ion Television and Live Well Network in the United States.

He has also appeared in the television series Bionic Woman, the television movies Confessions of a Go-Go Girl and Holiday in Handcuffs, and in the film Leslie, My Name is Evil, which premiered at the 2009 Toronto International Film Festival.

On July 20, 2009, it was announced that Milne had been cast as a principal cast member in the Canadian police drama series Rookie Blue, which aired on Global and in the United States on ABC.

He is also a voice actor, notable for being the new voice actor of Kamille Bidan, the protagonist of Mobile Suit Zeta Gundam, replacing Jonathan Lachlan-Stewart in the Dynasty Warriors: Gundam games.

== Filmography ==
=== Television ===
Year	Title	Role	Notes
2007	My Green House	Himself	Co-host, Reality Series
2007	Bionic Woman	Kyle - "Martini Guy"	
2007	Holiday in Handcuffs	Ryan	TV Movie
2008	Confessions of a Go-Go Girl	Eric Baldwin	TV Movie
2010	Rookie Blue	Chris Diaz	Main Role
2016	Saving Hope	Tom Crenshaw	5 Episodes
2016	Same Time Next Week	Ryan	Hallmark Movie
2020	Nurses	Cal	
2021	American Gods	Laura Moon's Father	
2021	Chucky	Detective Peyton	Recurring Role
2021	The Clue to Love	Morgan Cooper	TV Movie

=== Film ===
Year	Title	Role	Notes
2006	Regurgitation	guy date	Short Film
2007	Rare	Jay	Short Film
2008	Hope for the Broken Contender	Dane	Calgary International Film Festival Opening Night Selection
2009	Leslie, My Name Is Evil	Bobby Beausoleil	
2013	Nearlyweds	Nick	Television Film
2015	A Gift Wrapped Christmas	Charlie	Television Film
2016	Summer Love	Will Martin	Television Film
2017	Runaway Christmas Bride	Jason	Television Film

=== Voice Acting ===
- Dynasty Warriors: Gundam - Kamille Bidan
- Dynasty Warriors: Gundam 2 - Kamille Bidan
