= Missy Peregrym =

Canadian actress (born 1982)

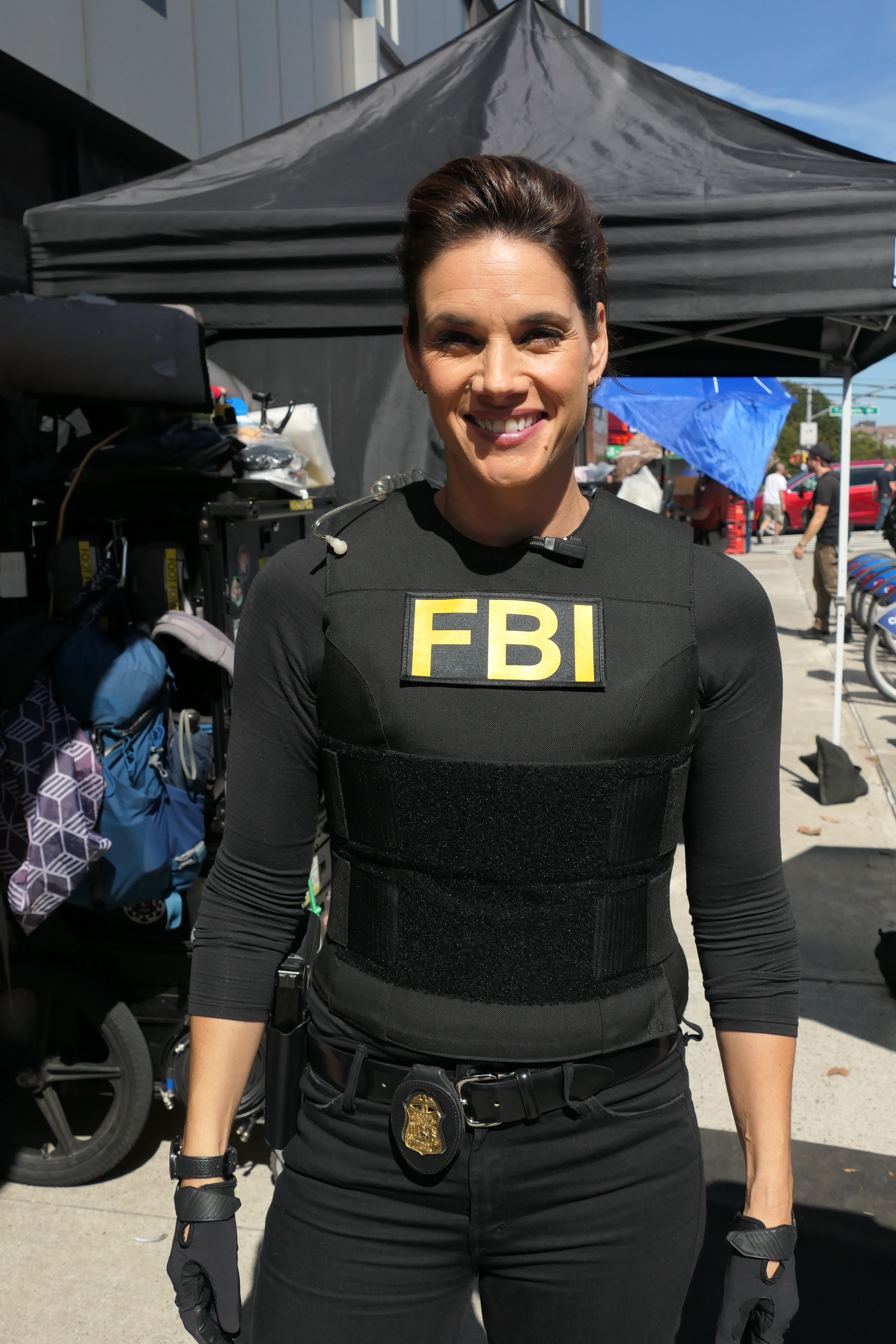
- Peregrym in 2025
- Born: Melissa Peregrym; June 16, 1982 (age 44); Montreal, Quebec, Canada
- Occupations: Actress, model
- Years active: 2002–present
- Known for: Andy McNally in Rookie Blue; Maggie Bell in FBI
- Spouses: Zachary Levi (m. 2014; div. 2015) Tom Oakley (m. 2018)
- Children: 2

Melissa "Missy" Peregrym (born June 16, 1982) is a Canadian actress, producer, and former fashion model. She is known for her roles as Haley Graham in the 2006 film Stick It; as Officer Andy McNally on the ABC and Global Television Network series Rookie Blue (2010–2015), for which she was nominated for a Canadian Screen Award in 2016; and as FBI special agent Maggie Bell in the CBS procedural FBI, a series in which she has had the leading role since the series began in 2018.

== Early life ==
Peregrym was born in Montreal to Darrell Peregrym, a Pentecostal minister, and Vanessa Peregrym, a housewife. She describes herself as having been a tomboy while growing up.

== Career ==
At age 18, Peregrym began her professional career with the Lizbell Agency. It was during her early modeling career that she was encouraged by her agency to move over to commercials. She did commercials for Mercedes-Benz, Sprint Canada, and the Olympic Games.

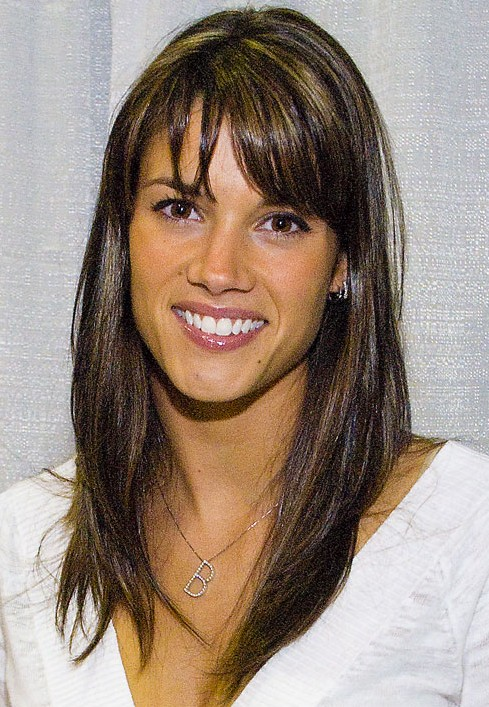
Peregrym in 2009

In 2000, Peregrym made her acting debut in an episode of Dark Angel, shot in Vancouver, British Columbia. Building upon her debut role, she performed in guest star roles on The Chris Isaak Show, Black Sash, Jake 2.0, Smallville, Tru Calling, Life as We Know It, Andromeda, Heroes, and in the television film Call Me: The Rise and Fall of Heidi Fleiss.

After an uncredited cameo in 2004's superhero film Catwoman, Peregrym made her film debut in 2006, playing the lead role in Stick It, a film revolving around a rebellious teenager who is forced to return to her former life in gymnastics.

Peregrym then played the role of an illusion-generating Candice Wilmer on the television series Heroes, who was billed by production staff in promotional materials as "a female temptress". She was due to appear for the first time in the episode entitled "Parasite," but she made her debut appearance in a non-speaking role in the episode entitled "Company Man" the week before.

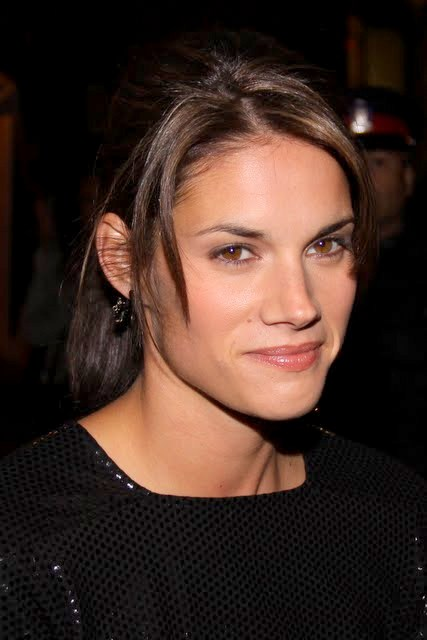
Peregrym at the 2010 Toronto Film Festival

Peregrym had her first lead television role on The CW series Reaper from 2007 to 2009. Nikki Reed initially played the role in the unaired pilot. Reaper was about a young man named Sam who became a bounty hunter for the devil.

Peregrym's big breakthrough came in 2010 when she landed a lead role in the Canadian television series Rookie Blue in the role of police officer Andy McNally. The series aired in North America, simultaneously on the Global Television Network in Canada and on ABC in the United States. The show ran for six seasons and ended in 2015.

In 2012, Peregrym was cast in the leading role of Chloe Jocelyn in Yahoo.com's web-based series Cybergeddon. The project was supported and funded in part by Norton. In 2013, she won a Streamy Award for her role in the web series Cybergeddon.

In 2014, Peregrym co-starred with Jeff Roop and Eric Balfour in the survival bear attack film Backcountry.

In 2016, Peregrym was nominated for a Canadian Screen Award for her role in Rookie Blue, but ultimately lost to Orphan Black's Tatiana Maslany.

In 2017, Peregrym joined the cast of Van Helsing in its second season as Scarlett Harker. She played this role on and off for 14 episodes until the show's end in 2021.

In 2018, Peregrym began her current lead role starring as Agent Maggie Bell in FBI, a series on CBS. As of 2026, she is a producer on the show.

== Personal life ==
In 2006, Peregrym joined forces with TOMS, a shoe company which also donates safe footwear for communities in South America. Peregrym has spoken about her experiences in Argentina and of its impact on the communities she visited.

Peregrym married American actor Zachary Levi in June 2014. Peregrym filed for divorce in April 2015, listing the date of separation as December 3, 2014.

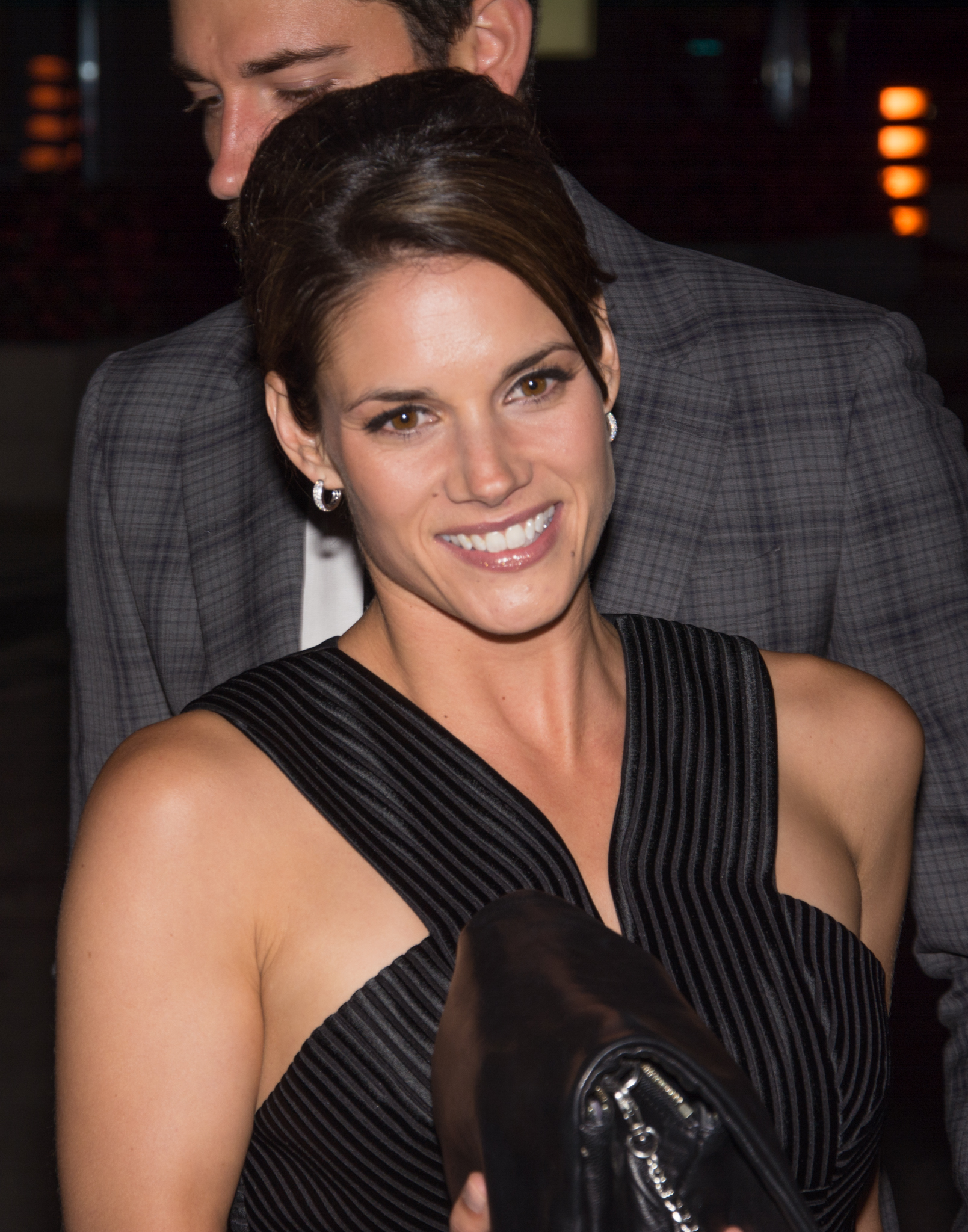
Peregrym in 2014

Peregrym married Australian actor Tom Oakley in Los Angeles on December 30, 2018. She and Oakley have a son, born on March 21, 2020, and they have a daughter, born on June 6, 2022.

== Filmography ==
=== Film ===
Year	Title	Role	Notes
2004	Call Me: The Rise and Fall of Heidi Fleiss	Tina	TV movie
2004	Catwoman	Beau-line Graphics Model	
2006	Stick It	Haley Graham	
2007	Wide Awake	Casey Wade	TV movie
2011	Something Red	Amy	Short
2013	The Proposal	Sara	Short
2014	Backcountry	Jenn	
2017	Pyewacket	911 Operator (voice)	
2024	Out Come the Wolves	Sophie	

=== Television ===
Year	Title	Role	Notes
2002	Dark Angel	Hottie Blood	Episode: "Love in Vein"
2002	The Chris Isaak Show	Julia	Episode: "Gimme Shelter"
2003	Jake 2.0	Girl in Bar	Episode: "Jerry 2.0"
2003	Tru Calling	Gina	Episode: "Putting Out Fires"
2003	Black Sash	Tory Stratton	Main Cast
2004	Smallville	Molly Griggs	Episode: "Delete"
2004	Andromeda	Lissett	Episode: "Time Out of Mind"
2004–05	Life as We Know It	Jackie Bradford	Main Cast
2006	Smallville: Vengeance Chronicles	Molly Griggs	Recurring Cast
2007	Heroes	Candice Wilmer	Recurring Cast: Season 1
2007–09	Reaper	Andi Prendergast	Main Cast
2010–15	Rookie Blue	Andrea "Andy" McNally	Main Cast
2012	Cybergeddon	Chloe Jocelyn	Main Cast
2012	Cybergeddon Zips	Chloe Jocelyn	Episode: "Chloe"
2016	Motive	Jessica Wilson	Episode: "In Plain Sight"
2016	Hawaii Five-0	Bridget Williams	Episode: "Ka Luhi"
2016	Mr. D	Mary	Episode: "Gerry Has Hot Sub Anxiety"
2017	Law & Order: Special Victims Unit	Zoey White	Episode: "Net Worth"
2017	Saving Hope	Layla Rowland	Recurring Cast: Season 5
2017	The Night Shift	Lt. Reagan	Episode: "Resurgence"
2017	Ten Days in the Valley	Jamie	Recurring Cast
2017–21	Van Helsing	Scarlett Harker	Recurring Cast: Season 2-3, Guest: Season 5
2018–present	FBI	FBI SA Margaret "Maggie" Bell	Main Cast
2021	FBI: International	FBI SA Margaret "Maggie" Bell	Episode: "Pilot"
2021–23	FBI: Most Wanted	FBI SA Margaret "Maggie" Bell	Guest Cast: Season 3-4
2026	CIA	FBI SA Margaret "Maggie" Bell	Episode: "Elimination Game"
