= List of Rookie Blue episodes =

Episodes of Canadian police drama television series

Rookie Blue is a Canadian police drama television series created by Morwyn Brebner, Tassie Cameron and Ellen Vanstone. It stars Missy Peregrym as Andy McNally, Enuka Okuma as Traci Nash, Travis Milne as Chris Diaz, Charlotte Sullivan as Gail Peck, Gregory Smith as Dov Epstein and Ben Bass as Sam Swarek. The drama follows the lives of a group of police officers who have just graduated from the academy. They must not only learn to deal with their duties as police officers, but also deal with the problems and expectation of their families and friends. The series premiered on June 24, 2010 on Global in Canada. It also airs on ABC in the U.S.

The original pilot script was written by Ilana Frank, after which thirteen episodes were ordered by Canwest. Casting began in June with Missy Peregrym being cast first and Gregory Smith shortly after. Production of the first season started July 14, 2009 and continued through November 2009.

The series was renewed for a second season on July 12, 2010, after only three episodes had aired. On July 13, 2011 the show was renewed for a third season.

Three episodes into the third season, the series was renewed for a fourth season.

On July 17, 2013, the series was renewed for a fifth season. Unlike the previous 13-episode seasons, season 5 was produced in a batch of 22 episodes. On August 7, 2014, it was announced that the 11-episode second half of season five would air in 2015, instead of being aired as a full season of twenty-two episodes, as originally intended. These remaining episodes were later re-branded as season 6.

== Series overview ==
Season	Episodes	Originally released	
Season	Episodes	First released	Last released
1	13	June 24, 2010	September 9, 2010
2	13	June 23, 2011	September 8, 2011
3	13	May 24, 2012	September 6, 2012
4	13	May 23, 2013	September 12, 2013
5	11	May 19, 2014	August 6, 2014
6	11	May 21, 2015	July 29, 2015

== Episodes ==
=== Season 1 (2010) ===
No. overall	No. in season	Title	Directed by	Written by	Original release date	Canadian viewers (millions)
1	1	"Fresh Paint"	David Wellington	Tassie Cameron	June 24, 2010	1.900
2	2	"Mercury Retrograde"	Charles Binamé	Morwyn Brebner	July 1, 2010	1.394
3	3	"Fite Nite"	David Wellington	Esta Spalding	July 8, 2010	1.753
4	4	"Signals Crossed"	Paul Fox	Sherry White	July 15, 2010	1.640
5	5	"Broad Daylight"	Alex Chapple	Semi Chellas	July 22, 2010	1.805
6	6	"Bullet Proof"	Charles Binamé	Ellen Vanstone	July 29, 2010	1.483
7	7	"Hot and Bothered"	David Wellington	Russ Cochrane	August 5, 2010	1.598
8	8	"Honour Roll"	Érik Canuel	Adam Pettle	August 12, 2010	1.529
9	9	"Girlfriend of the Year"	David Wellington	Tassie Cameron	August 19, 2010	1.476
10	10	"Big Nickel"	Steve DiMarco	Morwyn Brebner & Adam Pettle	August 26, 2010	1.682
11	11	"To Serve or Protect"	TW Peacocke	Russ Cochrane	September 2, 2010	1.547
12	12	"In Blue"	John Fawcett	Noelle Carbone & Esta Spalding	September 9, 2010	1.480 (Note: Ratings from BBM Canada for the two-hour season finale are reported as a single 2-hour time block instead of being divided into individual episodes.)
13	13	"Takedown"	David Wellington	Ellen Vanstone & Adam Barken & Tassie Cameron	September 9, 2010	1.480

=== Season 2 (2011) ===
No. overall	No. in season	Title	Directed by	Written by	Original release date	Canadian viewers (millions)
14	1	"Butterflies"	David Wellington	Tassie Cameron	23 June 2011	1.380
15	2	"Might Have Been"	Paul Shapiro	Semi Chellas	30 June 2011	1.070
16	3	"Bad Moon Rising"	David Wellington	Russ Cochrane	7 July 2011	1.399
17	4	"Heart & Sparks"	TW Peacocke	Morwyn Brebner	14 July 2011	1.250
18	5	"Stung"	Paul Fox	Noelle Carbone	21 July 2011	1.506
19	6	"In Plain View"	David Wellington	Adam Barken	28 July 2011	1.311
20	7	"The One That Got Away"	Steve DiMarco	Tassie Cameron	4 August 2011	1.402
21	8	"Monster"	John Fawcett	Sean Reycraft	11 August 2011	1.585
22	9	"Brotherhood"	Steve DiMarco	Adam Pettle	18 August 2011	1.226
23	10	"Best Laid Plans"	John Fawcett	Russ Cochrane	25 August 2011	1.642
24	11	"A Little Faith"	Sturla Gunnarsson	Sherry White	1 September 2011	1.365
25	12	"On The Double"	Peter Wellington	Ellen Vanstone	8 September 2011	0.964
26	13	"God's Good Grace"	David Wellington	Tassie Cameron	8 September 2011	1.465

=== Season 3 (2012) ===
No. overall	No. in season	Title	Directed by	Written by	Original release date	Canadian viewers (millions)
27	1	"The First Day of the Rest of Your Life"	David Wellington	Tassie Cameron	May 24, 2012	1.303
28	2	"Class Dismissed"	Tim Southam	Russ Cochrane	May 31, 2012	1.322
29	3	"A Good Shoot"	David Wellington	Greg Nelson	June 7, 2012	1.341
30	4	"Girls' Night Out"	Steve DiMarco	Noelle Carbone	June 28, 2012	1.121
31	5	"Messy Houses"	TW Peacocke	Sherry White	July 5, 2012	1.123
32	6	"Coming Home"	David Wellington	Ley Lukins	July 12, 2012	1.103
33	7	"Leap of Faith"	Peter Wellington	Tassie Cameron	July 19, 2012	1.275
34	8	"The Girlfriend Experience"	John Fawcett	Sandra Chwialkowska	July 26, 2012	1.150
35	9	"Out of Time"	John Fawcett	Russ Cochrane	August 9, 2012	1.325
36	10	"Cold Comforts"	Paul Fox	Sherry White	August 16, 2012	1.212
37	11	"The Rules"	Gregory Smith	Greg Nelson	August 23, 2012	1.269
38	12	"Every Man"	David Wellington	Noelle Carbone	August 30, 2012	1.070
39	13	"I Never"	David Wellington	Tassie Cameron	September 6, 2012	1.017

=== Season 4 (2013) ===
No. overall	No. in season	Title	Directed by	Written by	Original release date	Canadian viewers (millions)
40	1	"Surprises"	David Wellington	Tassie Cameron	May 23, 2013	1.157
41	2	"Homecoming"	David Wellington	Russ Cochrane	May 30, 2013	1.181
42	3	"Different, Not Better"	Lynne Stopkewich	Sherry White	June 27, 2013	1.042
43	4	"The Kids Are Not Alright"	Peter Wellington	Noelle Carbone	July 11, 2013	1.278
44	5	"Poison Pill"	Peter Wellington	Aubrey Nealon	July 18, 2013	1.226
45	6	"Skeletons"	T.W. Peacocke	Ley Lukins	July 25, 2013	1.205
46	7	"Friday the 13th"	David Wellington	Sherry White	August 1, 2013	1.336
47	8	"For Better, for Worse"	Kelly Makin	Tassie Cameron	August 8, 2013	1.244
48	9	"What I Lost"	Paul Fox	Noelle Carbone	August 15, 2013	1.192
49	10	"You Are Here"	Teresa Hannigan	Ley Lukins	August 22, 2013	1.165
50	11	"Deception"	Kelly Makin	Aubrey Nealon	August 29, 2013	1.196
51	12	"Under Fire"	Gregory Smith	Russ Cochrane	September 5, 2013	1.099
52	13	"You Can See the Stars"	David Wellington	Tassie Cameron	September 12, 2013	1.323

=== Season 5 (2014) ===
No. overall	No. in season	Title	Directed by	Written by	Original release date	Canadian viewers (millions)
53	1	"Blink"	David Wellington	Tassie Cameron	May 19, 2014	1.859
54	2	"All By Her Selfie"	David Wellington	Sherry White	May 26, 2014	1.570
55	3	"Heart Breakers, Money Makers"	Gregory Smith	Noelle Carbone	June 2, 2014	1.741
56	4	"Wanting"	Peter Wellington	Russ Cochrane	June 9, 2014	1.664
57	5	"Going Under"	T.W. Peacocke	John Krizanc	June 16, 2014	1.602
58	6	"Two Truths and a Lie"	Peter Wellington	Adriana Maggs	June 23, 2014	1.592
59	7	"Deal with the Devil"	David Wellington	Noelle Carbone	July 9, 2014	1.585
60	8	"Exit Strategy"	Jeff Woolnough	Matt MacLennan	July 16, 2014	1.498
61	9	"Moving Day"	Teresa Hannigan	Katrina Saville	July 23, 2014	1.677
62	10	"Fragments"	John Fawcett	Russ Cochrane	July 30, 2014	1.258
63	11	"Everlasting"	David Wellington	Sherry White	August 6, 2014	1.523

=== Season 6 (2015) ===
No. overall	No. in season	Title	Directed by	Written by	Original release date	Canadian viewers (millions)
64	1	"Open Windows"	Peter Stebbings	Tassie Cameron	May 21, 2015	1.532
65	2	"Perfect Family"	Eleanore Lindo	Adriana Maggs	May 28, 2015	1.576
66	3	"Uprising"	Gregory Smith	Sherry White	June 4, 2015	1.686
67	4	"Letting Go"	Steve Dimarco	Tassie Cameron & Katrina Saville	June 11, 2015	1.603
68	5	"A Real Gentleman"	Paul Fox	Karen Moore	June 18, 2015	1.568
69	6	"Home Run"	Gregory Smith	Shelley Eriksen	June 24, 2015	1.422
70	7	"Best Man"	Charles Officer	Adriana Maggs & Enuka Okuma	July 1, 2015	1.478
71	8	"Integrity Test"	James Genn	Alan McCullough	July 8, 2015	1.366
72	9	"Ninety Degrees"	T.W. Peacocke	Tassie Cameron & Bradley Simpson	July 15, 2015	1.466
73	10	"Breaking Up the Band"	Jason Priestley	Noelle Carbone	July 22, 2015	1.215
74	11	"74 Epiphanies"	David Wellington	Tassie Cameron	July 29, 2015	1.477
