= Rookie Blue season 1 =

Rookie Blue
- Season 1
- Region 1 DVD cover
- No. of episodes: 13

Release
- Original network: Global
- Original release: June 24 – September 9, 2010

Season chronology
- Next → Season 2

The first season of the Canadian police drama Rookie Blue began airing on June 24, 2010 with a simultaneous premiere on Global in Canada and ABC in the U.S. On July 12, 2010, four days after the third episode was broadcast, it was announced that the show had been renewed for a second season. The first season completed its run on September 9, 2010 with a double episode airing.

== Production ==
The series is set and filmed in Toronto. The first season was produced in 2009 by Canwest, Thump Inc., and E1 Entertainment. The season was shot on 35mm film. Tassie Cameron, a co-creator of the series, served as showrunner for the first season. Cameron described the premise and her inspiration for the show as, "A sort of primal theme that’s interested me is imposter syndrome and the feeling I think everybody has: if you’re new at something you feel like a fraud. So what if it was that, but with guns?" The cast had one day of training with real police officers. During production Rookie Blue was known as Copper.

There was a very extensive promotional campaign in Canada for the premiere of Rookie Blue. This included spots during the season finales of the top rated shows on Global, theatrical trailers, billboards in Toronto, Calgary, and Vancouver, print ads in major daily newspapers, an online game in which people could get a feel for what it is like to be a rookie police officer, online ads on some of the most popular sites, including TMZ.com, Perez Hilton's blog, Yahoo!, and AOL, and on June 24, 2010 every broadcast and cable channel owned by Canwest carried hourly promotional spots for the premiere that night.

== Ratings ==
In announcing the renewal of the series Canwest included revised figures of 2.1 million viewers, which makes it the most watched premiere of a Canadian drama series in more than a decade and the highest rated premiere for an original series commissioned by Canwest. The Canadian ratings company BBM Canada originally reported 1.9 million viewers.

In the United States the premiere was the most successful scripted summer debut in over a year and in nearly six years for ABC. "Fresh Paint" drew 7.253 million viewers and an audience share in the 18–49 demographic of 2.0/6, according to overnight figures.

== Cast ==
=== Main cast ===
- Missy Peregrym as Officer Andy McNally
- Gregory Smith as Officer Dov Epstein
- Eric Johnson as Detective Luke Callaghan
- Enuka Okuma as Officer Traci Nash
- Travis Milne as Officer Chris Diaz
- Charlotte Sullivan as Officer Gail Peck
- Noam Jenkins as Detective Jerry Barber
- Matt Gordon as Officer Oliver Shaw
- Lyriq Bent as Sergeant Frank Best
- Ben Bass as Officer Sam Swarek

=== Recurring ===
- Melanie Nicholls-King as Officer Noelle Williams
- Adam MacDonald as Detective Steve Peck
- Aidan Devine as Sergeant Boyko

== Episodes ==
| No. overall | No. in season | Title | Directed by | Written by | Original release date | Canadian viewers (millions) |
|---|---|---|---|---|---|---|
| 1 | 1 | "Fresh Paint" | David Wellington | Tassie Cameron | June 24, 2010 | 1.900 |
A group of rookie police officers start their first day. Unfortunately, their first call is to a domestic disturbance, which turns out to be a murder. In an attempt to catch the shooter, Andy McNally unknowingly arrests an undercover cop, Sam Swarek, ruining eight months of work. However she is able to redeem herself by apprehending the real criminal after a tense stand-off. Later, Sam makes it clear that he is still mad at Andy.
| 2 | 2 | "Mercury Retrograde" | Charles Binamé | Morwyn Brebner | July 1, 2010 | 1.394 |
15th Division is tasked with catching an escaped murderer. However McNally, who is paired with Swarek the undercover officer she previously arrested, defies orders to try and rescue an informant from a drug ring that Swarek was working on prior to his arrest. Epstein and Peck are able to apprehend the murderer; meanwhile McNally breaks the rules to secure both Swarek and the informant's lives. Later, it is shown that Sam has let go of most of his anger towards Andy and they nearly kiss only Andy stops because it is her first week and she doesn't want to mess things up. They both agree to forget it but Gail sees them.
| 3 | 3 | "Fite Nite" | David Wellington | Esta Spalding | July 8, 2010 | 1.753 |
The rookies are tasked to aid in an undercover operation. Although the operation is a success, Nash disobeys orders to capture a fleeing suspect. Nash, who has decided to participate in Fite Night (an annual boxing event) is also under pressure to keep alive the tradition of 15th Division winning the event. Meanwhile, McNally and Peck try to help a woman who is being beaten by her husband. Despite their best efforts, the woman decides to return to her husband. Nash is able to win Fite Nite.
| 4 | 4 | "Signals Crossed" | Paul Fox | Sherry White | July 15, 2010 | 1.640 |
McNally, Peck and Diaz are tasked as prostitutes in a sting operation. Nash however has been sent to work with Callaghan on a murdered John Doe. McNally is unable to perform and she is pulled; as is Epstein for blocking channels during a time of emergency. As a result, both decide to take down a weapons trafficking syndicate in an attempt to redeem themselves. Although their attempt is successful, they jeopardized a civilian in the process. Meanwhile Diaz manages to figure out the identity of the John Doe and realises that it is the same person whose father is asking round looking for his son who disappeared after they had a fight after he told him he was gay.
| 5 | 5 | "Broad Daylight" | Alex Chapple | Semi Chellas | July 22, 2010 | 1.805 |
After being called to a residence for a break and enter, McNally and Nash are left behind at the request of the mother. However Nash is forced to leave to get her son from day-care leaving McNally alone. Unknown to McNally, one of the robbers did not have time to flee and hid in the basement. The robber's subsequent attempt to escape is stopped and he draws a gun creating a hostage situation. Despite McNally forgetting to load her gun, she is able to talk the robber down. Also, Diaz and Epstein go undercover at a wedding to stop a group who have performed a string of high end break and enters.
| 6 | 6 | "Bullet Proof" | Charles Binamé | Ellen Vanstone | July 29, 2010 | 1.483 |
Nash and Williams stop a car-jacking and the suspect is then linked to a murder case that Callaghan has been assigned to. However, the murder charges will not stick as the bullet was never found at the scene. Callaghan enlists the help of McNally to watch a witness who actually has the bullet lodged in his skull after killing the victim. The witness manages to get away leaving McNally to find him before he is killed for what he knows. Despite being able to find the witness, he dies as a result of an operation to remove the bullet. Andy sees another side of Luke that she doesn't like and turns to Sam for support.
| 7 | 7 | "Hot and Bothered" | David Wellington | Russ Cochrane | August 5, 2010 | 1.598 |
The summer heat seems to be driving people's reckless behaviours. To make matters worse, there's a blackout in the city. McNally and Swarek arrest a minor for stealing an ice cream truck. Swarek believes that the theft was an act of rebellion; McNally who believes otherwise is sent out with Shaw to pursue leads. However, they're shortly called to a residence where a mother is reporting her daughter missing. McNally's instincts lead her to believe that two girls were abducted from the park and the minor they have in custody managed to escape. Her instincts are correct as McNally and Shaw trace the missing girl to an abandoned recreation center. Shaw is shot by the perpetrator leaving McNally by herself. After finding the girl, McNally comes face to face with the perpetrator and is forced to kill him in self-defense. She is in shock and goes to see Swarek, and ends up almost sleeping with him. Also, Epstein and Peck are forced to deliver a baby after a woman goes into labour. Complicating issues arise after the officers realize the woman suffers from agoraphobia and refuses to leave her residence.
| 8 | 8 | "Honour Roll" | Érik Canuel | Adam Pettle | August 12, 2010 | 1.529 |
While the senior officers attend retraining the rookies are sent out to various schools to do community outreach. Epstein and Nash are paired together, but they soon find themselves investigating a group of girls who are taking amphetamines. McNally and Diaz are sent back on patrol after being told they have come on the wrong day. During their patrol they find a man who has been assaulted. Further investigation reveals that a detective assaulted the man. McNally and Diaz are forced to report it, much to the displeasure of Peck and her brother Steve. The accused detective is Steve's partner. Andy must deal with the consequences of her previous actions.
| 9 | 9 | "Girlfriend of the Year" | David Wellington | Tassie Cameron | August 19, 2010 | 1.476 |
15th Division diverts its operations into finding a young girl and her abductor. Shaw, who has returned from his injuries, leads Peck, Diaz and Epstein in the field; with Nash at the mother's home. Epstein manages to get an ID on the abductor who is connected to the mother and a pedophile. Swarek believes the mother is hiding something and directs McNally to interrogate her, during which she reveals that she was high at the time of her daughter's abduction. However, she does provide a possible location for where her daughter could be taken. This information proves to be correct as the officers manage to rescue the girl. Luke finds out about Andy's run-in with Swarek.
| 10 | 10 | "Big Nickel" | Steve DiMarco | Morwyn Brebner & Adam Pettle | August 26, 2010 | 1.682 |
After all the rookies except McNally fail their gun re-certification, Peck and Epstein are assigned to help a man with amnesia while Nash and Diaz help Detective Barber reconstruct notes that went missing for an upcoming court case. McNally is assigned with Swarek to do a prisoner transport. Although they find their situation awkward, they talk and reconcile. However the inmate escapes the custody of the two officers, leaving them in a frantic race against daylight to find the prisoner.
| 11 | 11 | "To Serve or Protect" | TW Peacocke | Russ Cochrane | September 2, 2010 | 1.547 |
McNally and Swarek help investigate the murder of a suspected rapist and murderer. However upon finding evidence that implicates McNally's father as the culprit, the officers search for proof of his innocence. McNally's father is later cleared, after the wife of the deceased confesses to the murder. Meanwhile, a vigilante accesses police information via Diaz and Epstein's squad car. However upon being caught it is revealed he has vital evidence that helps towards taking down a major drug ring. Also, Peck confides in Nash about the pressure of expectation she feels.
| 12 | 12 | "In Blue" | John Fawcett | Noelle Carbone & Esta Spalding | September 9, 2010 | 1.480 (Note: Ratings from BBM Canada for the two-hour season finale are reported as a single 2-hour time block instead of being divided into individual episodes.) |
During her evaluation, McNally confides in Best about her fears of ruining her life because of the job. It is revealed in her most recent shift, McNally had informed a mother of her daughter's death. The shock of the news and the realization of the part she played in her daughter's death drives the mother to try and commit suicide until Williams intervenes preventing her death. The pain that McNally felt she caused mirrored that of one of her father's cases (To Serve or Protect). Best tells McNally to bury her father's skeletons and make a fresh start. All the rookies pass their evaluation and become fully fledged officers.
| 13 | 13 | "Takedown" | David Wellington | Ellen Vanstone & Adam Barken & Tassie Cameron | September 9, 2010 | 1.480 |
McNally and Diaz make an untimely arrest, which compromises a major heroin bust; Swarek goes undercover posing as the buyer with McNally as his girlfriend, to try and salvage the operation. Peck and Diaz, who are part of the surveillance team, search a seemingly empty warehouse. As they are leaving Diaz is stabbed and as Peck checks on him the door closes and they find themselves locked in a room. In an attempt to get out through an air vent Peck sees the heroin is being prepared for the deal. Swarek and McNally try to make the deal, but the dealer has other plans and Swarek is forced to leave to get the heroin from an undisclosed location. When McNally is told that the buyer's boss will be at the exchange, she realizes that Swarek's cover will be blown and calls back-up, blowing her cover in the process. Nash and Epstein notice that Peck and Diaz have failed to check-in from their location, leading them to believe that the warehouse is where the heroin is. Tactical teams arrive at the warehouse and successfully save Swarek, Diaz, and Peck and also take down the drug ring.

== U.S. Nielsen ratings ==
The following is a table for the United States ratings, based on average total estimated viewers per episode, of Rookie Blue on ABC.

Season 1 - (ABC)
| # | # | Title | U.S. air date | Rating | Share | Rating/share (18-49) | Viewers (millions) |
|---|---|---|---|---|---|---|---|
| 1 | 1 | "Fresh Paint" | June 24, 2010 | 4.3 | 8 | 2.0/6 | 7.240 |
| 2 | 2 | "Mercury Retrograde" | July 1, 2010 | 4.2 | 7 | 1.9/7 | 6.777 |
| 3 | 3 | "Fite Nite" | July 8, 2010 | 3.8 | 7 | 1.6/5 | 6.224 |
| 4 | 4 | "Signals Crossed" | July 15, 2010 | 4.0 | 7 | 1.8/6 | 6.382 |
| 5 | 5 | "Broad Daylight" | July 22, 2010 | 4.0 | 7 | 1.5/5 | 6.496 |
| 6 | 6 | "Bullet Proof" | July 29, 2010 | 4.1 | 7 | 1.8/6 | 6.706 |
| 7 | 7 | "Hot and Bothered" | August 5, 2010 | 4.2 | 7 | 1.8/6 | 6.866 |
| 8 | 8 | "Honour Roll" | August 12, 2010 | 3.7 | 6 | 1.7/5 | 5.973 |
| 9 | 9 | "Girlfriend of the Year" | August 19, 2010 | 4.0 | 7 | 1.7/5 | 6.384 |
| 10 | 10 | "Big Nickel" | August 26, 2010 | 3.8 | 6 | 1.7/5 | 6.170 |
| 11 | 11 | "To Serve or Protect" | September 2, 2010 | 3.0 | 5 | 1.1/3 | 4.682 |
| 12 | 12 | "In Blue" | September 9, 2010 | | | 1.2/3 | 4.985 |
| 13 | 13 | "Takedown" | September 9, 2010 | | | 1.1/3 | 4.738 |
