= Rookie Blue season 2 =

Rookie Blue
- Season 2
- Region 1 DVD cover
- No. of episodes: 13

Release
- Original network: Global
- Original release: 23 June – 8 September 2011

Season chronology
- ← Previous; Season 1 Next → Season 3

The second season of Rookie Blue began airing on 23 June 2011 on both ABC and Global. The entire season one cast, led by Missy Peregrym, Ben Bass and Gregory Smith returned, whilst Melanie Nicholls-King continued to recur as Officer Noelle Williams.

== Production ==
The series was renewed for a second 13-episode season on 12 July 2010. Filming of the second season was scheduled to take place between 1 September 2010 and 24 January 2011. Camille Sullivan joined the cast as Detective Jo Rosati. Lauren Holly guest starred as Elaine Peck, a Superintendent in charge of Operations at the Metropolitan Police Service.

== Cast ==
=== Main cast ===
- Missy Peregrym as Officer Andy McNally
- Gregory Smith as Officer Dov Epstein
- Eric Johnson as Detective Luke Callaghan
- Enuka Okuma as Officer Traci Nash
- Travis Milne as Officer Chris Diaz
- Charlotte Sullivan as Officer Gail Peck
- Noam Jenkins as Detective Jerry Barber
- Matt Gordon as Officer Oliver Shaw
- Lyriq Bent as Sergeant Frank Best
- Ben Bass as Officer Sam Swarek

=== Recurring ===
- Melanie Nicholls-King as Officer Noelle Williams

== Episodes ==
No. overall	No. in season	Title	Directed by	Written by	Original release date	Canadian viewers (millions)
14	1	"Butterflies"	David Wellington	Tassie Cameron	23 June 2011	1.380
Andy's world explodes as a result of a seemingly senseless act of violence during a concert. When she sets out to unravel the details, she comes into direct conflict with Luke's former partner, Detective Jo Rosati, a new detective with 15 Division. As Rosati investigates the case, sparks begin to fly between her and Luke. Dov and Chris take charge to find out who the shooter is and Swarek debates whether or not to rejoin Guns & Gangs.
15	2	"Might Have Been"	Paul Shapiro	Semi Chellas	30 June 2011	1.070
Andy and Gail participate in a drug bust by going undercover as cocktail waitresses but things do not go smoothly. Traci finds herself drawn back to Detective Barber while a complaint is filed against Dov. Andy unintentionally speaks to Tori a little too freely and candidly about her relationship with Luke.
16	3	"Bad Moon Rising"	David Wellington	Russ Cochrane	7 July 2011	1.399
Strange happenings and a full moon rattle the rookies. Andy and Sam investigate the theft of some severed heads from a medical lab. A particular man catches their attention as a suspect with his obsessive behavior. Luke and Andy decide to get married, and Sam has trouble hiding his opinions. While trying to protect a young woman who could be the next target, Andy puts both her life and Luke's in jeopardy.
17	4	"Heart & Sparks"	TW Peacocke	Morwyn Brebner	14 July 2011	1.250
As 15 Division recovers from the shooting of Det. Luke Callaghan, a series of arson culminates in the torching of a laundromat – and the rookies are forced to confront their own burning issues. Chris and Gail take to the streets and encounter a man from Chris's past, while Traci interrogates a young firebug found at the arson scene. Meanwhile, when Andy tries to stop the grieving widow from entering the burnt-out laundromat, the two women are trapped in an unstable building with a burnt corpse and must rely on the Fire Department to cut them free from the debris.
18	5	"Stung"	Paul Fox	Noelle Carbone	21 July 2011	1.506
Using a local car dealership, 15 Division runs a sting operation to crack down on suspects with outstanding warrants. One of the criminals they capture tries to bargain for a lighter sentence, by giving information that puts Dov and Chris in peril at a meth house. The discovery of a homeless suspect leads Traci and Andy to do the right thing and when Luke and Jo work together on a surveillance job, they end up in each other's arms.
19	6	"In Plain View"	David Wellington	Adam Barken	28 July 2011	1.311
Indications are that the East Jameson gang was involved in the murder of a police informant, so solving the case will be difficult. The pressure is on when Superintendent Elaine Peck sets up at the station. Elsewhere, Andy is paired with Detective Rosati who is jealous of Andy and Luke's relationship, intentionally makes Andy privy to a secret that involves Luke. Stressed out with her mother at the station, Gail is tasked with protecting an eight-year-old boy who's the only witness to the crime.
20	7	"The One That Got Away"	Steve DiMarco	Tassie Cameron	4 August 2011	1.402
Andy worries her personal problems are affecting her professionally when a woman is brutally attacked on her watch; Luke's erratic behavior leads to him being kicked off a case. The primary suspect is Ray Nixon, who had, according to Luke, murdered a rookie from 15.
21	8	"Monster"	John Fawcett	Sean Reycraft	11 August 2011	1.585
Gail and Traci bring an intoxicated man to the station. As the doctors examine the man's unusual condition, 15 Division is put under quarantine. Meanwhile, Andy and Sam arrest a man who robbed a bank. Chris goes undercover to get some information from the man. Traci is stuck with a married couple who both work as paramedics and do nothing but argue. Dov shares a kiss with his bomb squad officer girlfriend, Sue.
22	9	"Brotherhood"	Steve DiMarco	Adam Pettle	18 August 2011	1.226
Traci and Gail try to find out the motive of an Asian woman for calling the police to report a fake bomb threat at a restaurant. Dov, Andy and Chris have their equine training at the Mounted Unit, together with other rookies from 27 Division. Chris meets his old friend from the academy, Aaron, while an intoxicated Dov tells Gail his feelings for her.
23	10	"Best Laid Plans"	John Fawcett	Russ Cochrane	25 August 2011	1.642
Andy saves a woman who is pinned in her car while the remaining of 15 Division investigates a kidnapping case. Swarek tells Andy that he has decided to go back to Guns & Gangs. Chris questions Dov and Gail about their relationship while Andy decides to call Swarek and says she is ready to take their relationship to the next level not knowing he's already left for his undercover assignment.
24	11	"A Little Faith"	Sturla Gunnarsson	Sherry White	1 September 2011	1.365
Andy, Dov and Traci participate in an undercover training exercise which results in some unplanned situations and choices. They run into Swarek and almost blow their covers to save a girl's life. Dov runs into an old friend of his brother. Chris and Gail must look past the wreckage of their relationship to determine what to do when a young boy is found tied up as the result of bullying.
25	12	"On The Double"	Peter Wellington	Ellen Vanstone	8 September 2011	0.964
Gail's stolen uniform has the rookies looking for a cop impersonator, but it is Chris and Dov who find clues that may offer up the motive. While undercover, Swarek finds himself in a life threatening situation when he and Andy can't stay apart from each other after they have finally begun their relationship whilst he is still undercover.
26	13	"God's Good Grace"	David Wellington	Tassie Cameron	8 September 2011	1.465
Swarek’s gone missing while undercover and Andy tries to find clues that will help her and the rookies locate him before it is too late. Meanwhile, investigating this case will implicate one officer and threaten Andy's job, they both get suspended but Sam still wants to be with her and she says she wants to be with him but she doesn't stay.

== U.S. Nielsen ratings ==
The following is a table for the United States ratings, based on average total estimated viewers per episode, of Rookie Blue on ABC.

Season 2 (ABC)
#	#	Title	U.S. air date	Rating	Share	Rating/share (18–49)	Viewers (millions)
14	1	"Butterflies"	23 June 2011	3.7	6	1.6/5	5.88
15	2	"Might Have Been"	30 June 2011	3.4	6	1.4/4	5.43
16	3	"Bad Moon Rising"	7 July 2011	3.6	6	1.5/4	5.70
17	4	"Heart & Sparks"	14 July 2011	3.5	6	1.4/4	5.33
18	5	"Stung"	21 July 2011	3.5	6	1.3/4	5.39
19	6	"In Plain View"	28 July 2011	3.1	5	1.3/4	4.92
20	7	"The One That Got Away"	4 August 2011	3.4	6	1.3/4	5.20
21	8	"Monster"	11 August 2011	3.4	6	1.0/3	3.97
22	9	"Brotherhood"	18 August 2011	3.1	5	1.2/4	4.57
23	10	"Best Laid Plans"	25 August 2011	3.4	6	1.2/4	4.89
24	11	"A Little Faith"	1 September 2011	3.9	6	1.1/3	4.09
25	12	"On The Double"	8 September 2011	3.0	5	1.0/3	4.51
26	13	"God's Good Grace"	8 September 2011	3.4	6	1.2/3	5.06
