= Rookie Blue season 3 =

Rookie Blue
- Season 3
- Region 1 DVD cover art
- No. of episodes: 13

Release
- Original network: Global
- Original release: May 24 – September 6, 2012

Season chronology
- ← Previous; Season 2 Next → Season 4

The third season of the Canadian police drama Rookie Blue starring Missy Peregrym, Ben Bass and Gregory Smith premiered on May 24, 2012, on Global in Canada.

== Production ==
On July 13, 2011 ABC and Global announced that Rookie Blue had been renewed for a third season of thirteen episodes. William Shatner guest starred in the season premiere as a drunk driver. Peter Mooney plays new rookie, Nick Collins.

Peter Mooney joined the main cast as Officer Nick Collins, whilst recurring actor Melanie Nicholls-King was promoted to main cast. Noam Jenkins departed the main cast during season 3, whilst this was also the first season not to feature Eric Johnson in a starring role. Instead, he returned for several guest appearances.

== Cast ==
=== Main cast ===
- Missy Peregrym as Officer Andy McNally
- Gregory Smith as Officer Dov Epstein
- Enuka Okuma as Detective Traci Nash
- Travis Milne as Officer Chris Diaz
- Charlotte Sullivan as Officer Gail Peck
- Peter Mooney as Officer Nick Collins
- Noam Jenkins as Detective Jerry Barber
- Matt Gordon as Officer Oliver Shaw
- Lyriq Bent as Sergeant Frank Best
- Melanie Nicholls-King as Officer Noelle Williams
- Ben Bass as Officer Sam Swarek

=== Recurring ===
- Eric Johnson as Detective Luke Callaghan

== Episodes ==
No. overall	No. in season	Title	Directed by	Written by	Original release date	Canadian viewers (millions)
27	1	"The First Day of the Rest of Your Life"	David Wellington	Tassie Cameron	May 24, 2012	1.303
After her three-month suspension, McNally faces an official hearing which will decide if she should be reinstated back onto the force. However, upon returning, she and Swarek are accidentally involved in a missing child case when a drunk driver (William Shatner) collides with a van and finds a teenage girl in the back. Also, Peck gets a shock when a new rookie, ex-soldier Nick Collins (Peter Mooney), arrives for his first day at 15 Division.: This episode marks the debut appearance of Peter Mooney as Officer Nick Collins.
28	2	"Class Dismissed"	Tim Southam	Russ Cochrane	May 31, 2012	1.322
While tracking down Dov and Shaw's police car, which was stolen by students as a prank in a secret scavenger hunt, McNally and Swarek pick up the trail of an armed teenager who robbed and assaulted a local criminal. Meanwhile, Collins tries to mend his present relationship with Gail.
29	3	"A Good Shoot"	David Wellington	Greg Nelson	June 7, 2012	1.341
Dov’s world explodes into chaos when he walks in on a convenience store robbery in progress and shoots a young black teenager, who may or may not have been armed. The tight-knit community erupts in outrage, as the ensuing investigation calls into question whether Dov used excessive force or acted too quickly. Filled with self-doubt, Dov is left to wonder if he operated within the guidelines or if he will be charged with murder, as 15 Division struggles to prevent a riot in the sweltering streets.
30	4	"Girls' Night Out"	Steve DiMarco	Noelle Carbone	June 28, 2012	1.121
All hell breaks loose on Traci’s first day as detective when a carload of young women from a bachelorette party slams into another vehicle, apparently killing the driver. When the police discover that the driver of the parked car was dead before the accident, Traci realizes that her "rookie" handling of the car crash may have compromised the pending homicide investigation. Meanwhile, as Gail and Chris work together on the case, Chris realizes not only that he still has feelings for Gail, but that he has competition. Finally, when Traci and Andy uncover a secret the bride is desperately trying to keep, it is a race to find the murderer before he strikes again.
31	5	"Messy Houses"	TW Peacocke	Sherry White	July 5, 2012	1.123
Andy’s personal life turns upside-down when she answers a domestic disturbance call and the social worker on the scene turns out to be her long estranged mother, Claire, who abandoned her and her father 15 years ago. Now Andy must deal with her private issues as she works alongside her mother to investigate the secrets of a family in turmoil. Meanwhile, Sam, Nick, Chris and Gail are in a race to find the desperate mother and her two children before she makes a tragic mistake. And Detective Jerry Barber’s badge may be on the line when a stash of guns he recovered ends up resurfacing on the streets.
32	6	"Coming Home"	David Wellington	Ley Lukins	July 12, 2012	1.103
A noise complaint at an illegal warehouse party leads Andy and Swarek to an injured John Doe, a homeless squatter who has been brutally stabbed. They apprehend a surprising material witness, Oliver Shaw's 15-year-old daughter, Izzy. When Izzy disappears, the officers move into emergency mode to track her down. But her involvement in the crime nearly pushes Shaw over the edge, both as a cop and a father.
33	7	"Leap of Faith"	Peter Wellington	Tassie Cameron	July 19, 2012	1.275
After the embarrassing loss of a key witness in an upcoming organized crime trial, the officers of 15 Division must turn to a man who claims he is a gifted psychic to help track the witness down. Having taken a leap of faith when his information checks out, they begin to suspect the man's motives... Is he a talented psychic or brilliant con man? The police are compelled to confront some hidden truths about themselves and their fellow officers.
34	8	"The Girlfriend Experience"	John Fawcett	Sandra Chwialkowska	July 26, 2012	1.150
A grad student's disappearance leads Andy and Nick to discover the woman's double life as a high-end escort. When a pattern of missing women emerges, Gail, who is physically similar to the victims, is sent in on an undercover sting operation. Meanwhile, Dov and Chris are following a different lead, and when they uncover the body of a missing woman, the case takes an even more dangerous turn. A twisted killer is still at large, but, now, does he have his sights set on Gail?
35	9	"Out of Time"	John Fawcett	Russ Cochrane	August 9, 2012	1.325
The same night the officers of 15 Division are forced to release a suspected predator for lack of evidence, Gail is violently assaulted in Andy and Gail's apartment, and is abducted. Detective Luke Callaghan is brought in to oversee the case that very well may be the work of a serial murderer. Working frantically to track down Gail's abductor before it's too late, the officers rally and zero in on their prime suspect. But when that search comes up empty, they have to go back to the drawing board which leads Andy and Swarek back to the same hotel where they ran the call-girl sting the night before. Meanwhile, the other rookies follow up on leads to similar cases in a desperate search for details that might point to Gail's whereabouts. And when one of the officers follows up on a simple lead, it puts them directly in the path of the demented killer forcing them to make the ultimate sacrifice. Recurring star: Eric Johnson as Detective Luke Callaghan: This episode marks the final appearance of Noam Jenkins as Detective Jerry Barber.
36	10	"Cold Comforts"	Paul Fox	Sherry White	August 16, 2012	1.212
The officers of 15 Division struggle to come to terms with their fallen colleague and get back to work patrolling the streets. When they discover that a police laptop containing sensitive information has been stolen they set off on a hunt to recover the computer and prevent any dangerous fallout. Andy, Nick and Swarek eventually uncover a drug informant who may have been compromised by the leak – and decide to see the deal through in order to protect the man’s life. When that informant’s motives come into question, it drives a wedge between Andy and Swarek that unleashes a flurry of pent-up emotions.
37	11	"The Rules"	Gregory Smith	Greg Nelson	August 23, 2012	1.269
Andy and Nick are called to the scene of a van that’s been torched, and discover that it belongs to Father Jean Pierre, a street priest who's been receiving death threats from the local drug kingpin. Although the priest is reluctant to accept the officers’ help, things turn more dangerous when Father Jean Pierre is the target of a drive-by shooting. During their investigation, Andy and Nick learn some surprising secrets about the priest’s history and the surprising connection that he has with one of the members of the kingpin’s crew. Meanwhile, Gail and Traci pick up one of the dealers young runners: a girl who refuses to inform, forcing Traci to make a major decision about her career; Chris tangles with Swarek as they clash over what it takes to be a good cop; and Dov’s new relationship takes a dramatic and dangerous turn.
38	12	"Every Man"	David Wellington	Noelle Carbone	August 30, 2012	1.070
With the senior officers off on another assignment, the rookies of 15 Division are on their own. But a seemingly innocuous shift leads to a frenzied night in the station when an improperly searched prisoner pulls a gun on Chris in booking. With Internal Affairs looking for someone to blame and potentially dismiss, the rookies find themselves recalling and defending their actions during the chaotic shift. Knowing someone’s career may be on the line, they walk the delicate line between telling the truth and having each other’s backs as they reflect on the personal and professional choices that might have helped lead to the night’s events. Meanwhile, Gail is still trying to be normal after her harrowing abduction; Chris is blindsided with a personal revelation; and Andy learns a dark secret about Nick’s past in the Army. When the Internal Affairs inquiry reaches its end, it seems as though Chris will take the blame but as another officer steps in and takes the fall, it appears that 15 Division will likely be losing one of its rookies.
39	13	"I Never"	David Wellington	Tassie Cameron	September 6, 2012	1.017
When a violent child abductor escapes from an emergency hospital visit, the officers of 15 Division try to track him down before he takes another young victim. When Andy and Dov discover that the desperate man has snatched another girl, Andy and Swarek find themselves in a deadly standoff to save the terrified victim, resulting in a major emotional confrontation and a serious choice for Andy. Meanwhile, Chris' family obligations have him contemplating a transfer, and Traci and Gail each face monumental decisions regarding their respective careers.

== U.S. Nielsen ratings ==
The following is a table for the United States ratings, based on average total estimated viewers per episode, of Rookie Blue on ABC.

Season 3 (ABC)
#	#	Title	U.S. air date	Rating	Share	Rating/share (18–49)	Viewers (millions)
27	1	"The First Day of the Rest of Your Life"	May 24, 2012	4.0	7	1.4/4	6.09
28	2	"Class Dismissed"	May 31, 2012	3.9	7	1.4/4	5.65
29	3	"A Good Shoot"	June 7, 2012	3.7	6	1.3/4	5.51
30	4	"Girls Night Out'"	June 28, 2012	3.0	5	1.1/3	4.71
31	5	"Messy Houses"	July 5, 2012	3.3	6	1.3/4	5.13
32	6	"Coming Home"	July 12, 2012	3.2	6	1.2/4	4.73
33	7	"Leap of Faith"	July 19, 2012	3.2	6	1.4/4	5.02
34	8	"The Girlfriend Experience"	July 26, 2012	3.6	6	1.5/5	5.75
35	9	"Out of Time"	August 9, 2012	3.2	5	1.1/3	3.80
36	10	"Cold Comforts"	August 16, 2012	3.3	6	1.1/3	4.79
37	11	"The Rules"	August 23, 2012	3.2	6	1.0/4	4.23
38	12	"Every Man"	August 30, 2012	3.7	6	0.9/3	3.80
39	13	"I Never"	September 6, 2012	3.3	5	1.2/3	5.08
