= Mary Kills People =

Canadian television series

- Genre: Drama
- Created by: Tara Armstrong
- Directed by: Holly Dale
- Starring: Caroline Dhavernas
- Country of origin: Canada
- Original language: English
- No. of seasons: 3
- No. of episodes: 18

Production
- Executive producer: Tassie Cameron
- Running time: 42–44 minutes
- Production companies: Entertainment One; Corus Entertainment; Cameron Pictures Inc.

Original release
- Network: Global
- Release: January 25, 2017 – June 16, 2019

Mary Kills People is a Canadian drama television series starring Caroline Dhavernas. It premiered on Global on January 25, 2017.

On June 5, 2017, the series was renewed for a second season, which was scheduled to premiere on Global's video-on-demand platforms on January 1 before premiering on television on January 3, 2018.

On 4 June 2018 the series was renewed for a third and final season by Global.

== Premise ==
Dr. Mary Harris works at the emergency department of the Eden General Hospital and has a side business as an end of life counselor—she and her partner Des provide assisted suicide. Their lives get complicated when the police start investigating them.

== Cast ==
- Caroline Dhavernas as Mary Harris
- Jay Ryan as Detective Ben Wesley, who is investigating Mary and goes undercover briefly as terminally ill patient Joel Collins
- Richard Short as Desmond "Des" Bennett, Mary's business partner
- Lyriq Bent as Detective Frank Gaines, who is working the case with Ben
- Greg Bryk as Grady Burgess, Des's former drug dealer who provided him and Mary with pentobarbital (season 1)
- Sebastien Roberts as Kevin, Mary's ex-husband
- Abigail Winter as Jessica "Jess", Mary's teenage daughter
- Charlotte Sullivan as Nicole Mitchell, Mary's sister
- Grace Lynn Kung as Annie Chung, a nurse at Eden General who refers patients to Mary and Des
- Jess Salgueiro as Larissa, Des's girlfriend
- Katie Douglas as Naomi Malik, Jess's friend
- Alexandra Castillo as Louise Malick, a lawyer who is Naomi's mother and Kevin's girlfriend
- Joel Thomas Hynes as Sidney "Sid" Thomas-Haye (season 1)
- Lola Flanery as Cambie, Mary's younger daughter
- Terra Hazelton as Rhonda McCartney, a nurse at Eden General
- Matt Gordon as Dennis Taylor
- Rachelle Lefevre as Olivia Bloom, Grady's sister (season 2)
- Rachael Ancheril as Lucy Oliviera (season 3)
- Elizabeth Saunders as Nurse Francis (season 3)
- Laura de Carteret as Dr. Ingress

== Production ==
The series, which was to comprise six episodes, was commissioned by TV network Global on January 28, 2016. Production began in summer 2016, and the first episode aired January 25, 2017. In the United States, the series was picked up by Lifetime on October 13, 2016. Mary Kills People premiered in the US on Lifetime on April 23, 2017.

As of January 23, 2017, there were talks to produce a second season according to Metro News and Caroline Dhavernas. On June 5, 2017, the series was renewed for a six-episode followup season. Production occurred over summer 2017 in Toronto and Hamilton. Lifetime announced their pickup of the second season in the United States on July 28, 2017; it premiered on March 12, 2018.

On December 3, 2018, it was announced that Lifetime would not air the final season. The series concluded production at the end of the third season.

== Episodes ==
Season	Episodes	Originally released	
Season	Episodes	First released	Last released
1	6	January 25, 2017	February 22, 2017
2	6	January 3, 2018	February 7, 2018
3	6	May 12, 2019	June 16, 2019

=== Season 1 (2017) ===
No. overall	No. in season	Title	Directed by	Written by	Original release date	Prod. code	Canadian viewers (millions)
1	1	"Bloody Mary"	Holly Dale	Tara Armstrong	January 25, 2017	280532-1	1.059
After the pentobarbital proves inefficient with a patient, Mary finds out the entire batch had been diluted. Mary and Des meet with a new patient, Joel, for the first time. Mary makes a romantic advance on Joel but leaves when he asks her to give him the pento on the spot. Joel is revealed to be a cop.
2	2	"The River Styx"	Holly Dale	Mike Goldbach	February 1, 2017	280532-2	1.045
Mary suggests other options to Joel, who firmly refuses before giving her a call to let her know he would take matters into his own hands. She decides to help him, but after she is unable to find the medication, she realizes he is a cop. Mary gets rid of the pento before she gets a call from Des telling her that they need to help a patient immediately, which forces her to go to Grady herself to get more. Joel reveals his real name, Ben, to Mary while she maintains her innocence.
3	3	"Wave the White Flag"	Holly Dale	Marsha Greene	February 8, 2017	280532-3	N/A
Sid shows up at the Eden General emergency department with a leg injury and under police custody. Grady uses Mary's daughter Jess to get her to break Sid out; Grady then kills Sid, so he does not make a deal with the police. Ben and Frank look into Troy Dixon's death.
4	4	"Raised By Wolves"	Holly Dale	Tara Armstrong	February 15, 2017	280532-4	N/A
Grady tells Mary he knows about her side business with Des and wants in on it. Ben follows Mary to her childhood home and meets her sister, Nicole. He then finds out their real last name is Mitchell, and Mary changed it to Harris after her mother's death—which she was investigated for. Frank persuades Des to help the police gather evidence against Mary in exchange for immunity.
5	5	"The Judas Cradle"	Holly Dale	Sherry White	February 22, 2017	280532-5	N/A
Ben goes to Des's place with the wire and finds out he is high. They decide to continue with the plan, but Des shows Mary the wire before anything incriminating is recorded. She later meets the patient alone and, after giving him the drink, tells him about her mother. Des overdoses but Mary is able to save him, ending their partnership afterwards. She takes the files he had in his house and buries them, then offers Grady the chance to be her new partner.
6	6	"Morning Glory"	Holly Dale	Tara Armstrong & Tassie Cameron & Marsha Greene	February 22, 2017	280532-6	N/A
After Grady agrees to be Mary's new partner, she shows him the files of three clients—Morgan Lewis, Ethan Grant and Troy Dixon—before trying to teach him how to do the injections; he insists he can do it with her assistance. She agrees, and he injects her with watered down pento thinking it was saline. Des calls Frank telling him he wants to make a statement, which Frank presumes will implicate Mary, but when Des arrives at the station he claims Mary is innocent and instead places the blame on Grady. Mary calls Ben and tells him that Grady drugged her and is going to kill her. Ben arrives at Grady's house and fatally shoots him. Nicole tells Mary she wants to be part of her business.

=== Season 2 (2018) ===
No. overall	No. in season	Title	Directed by	Written by	Original release date	Prod. code
7	1	"The Means"	Kelly Makin	Tara Armstrong	January 3, 2018	280532-7
Des is happy to reteam with Mary following his stint in prison. But a routine case with a devastating outcome has her rethinking their partnership.
8	2	"The Connection"	Kelly Makin	Lara Azzopardi	January 10, 2018	280532-8
When Olivia attempts to blackmail Mary, she is drawn deeper into a deadly game of cat and mouse that has a surprising connection to Ben.
9	3	"Twin Flames"	Norma Bailey	Marsha Greene	January 17, 2018	280532-9
Mary and Ben decide to join forces and hide Travis at Ben's secluded trailer. But when Travis reveals a crucial detail about Ben's investigation, Mary is forced to reconsider their alliance.
10	4	"Ride or Die"	Norma Bailey	Morwyn Brebner	January 24, 2018	280532-10
Following the disappearance of Travis, Des worries that he and Mary may have crossed a moral line from which they can never return. After jeopardizing Ben's investigation of Olivia, Mary tries to make amends, which has repercussions for a patient in dire need.
11	5	"Come to Jesus"	David Wellington	Lara Azzopardi & Tassie Cameron & Marsha Greene	January 31, 2018	280532-11
All seems well for Mary, Ben has forgiven her, and she and Des have decided to move forward with the death retreat. The only nagging concern for Mary: her daughter Jess hates her and doesn't believe a word out of her mouth.
12	6	"Fatal Flaw"	David Wellington	Tara Armstrong & Morwyn Brebner	February 7, 2018	280532-12
Mary decides to wear a wire in order to help Ben take down Olivia, but when their plan takes an unexpected turn, Mary must reconsider her allegiance. As Des and Nicole prepare for Brendan's death, Des faces crippling self-doubt about his dream.

=== Season 3 (2019) ===
No. overall	No. in season	Title	Directed by	Written by	Original release date
13	1	"The Key to Faith"	Norma Bailey	Tassie Cameron	May 12, 2019
14	2	"Girl Problems"	Norma Bailey	Jane Maggs	May 19, 2019
15	3	"No Happy Endings Here"	James Genn	Matt Huether	May 26, 2019
16	4	"Switzerland Has Trees"	James Genn	Karen Moore	June 2, 2019
17	5	"Wolf, Meet Henhouse"	Paul Fox	Chris Roberts	June 9, 2019
18	6	"A Goddamned Saint"	Paul Fox	Marsha Greene	June 16, 2019

== Reception ==
=== Critical response ===
The first season has received a score of 66 on Metacritic, indicating generally favourable reviews, based on eight reviews, and a rating of 100% on review aggregation website Rotten Tomatoes based on eleven reviews for an average rating of 7.5/10, the site's critical consensus stating: "Mary Kills People is more than its unique premise, with a layered lead performance and consistently entertaining narrative keeping the show's dark comedy grounded in relatable reality." The second season also received 100% based on five reviews, for an average rating of 9.4/10.

John Doyle of The Globe and Mail called the first episode of the show "remarkably assured, droll and adult. It’s very smart and utterly intriguing." He praises Mary Harris as "one of the most compelling, original female characters in years" and Caroline Dhavernas as "exceptional" in her portrayal: "Perhaps the best thing about it is the crazy sparkle in Mary’s eyes. There is something anarchic bubbling inside her."

Variety's Maureen Ryan said the show "pulls off a melding of tones — comedic, dramatic, and philosophical — that seems next to impossible," but criticized the first season's romance subplots.

=== Awards ===
Canadian Screen Awards
Year	Category	Nominee(s)	Result	Ref.
2018	Best Dramatic Series	Tassie Cameron, Amy Cameron, Jocelyn Hamilton, Tecca Crosby, Tara Armstrong, Holly Dale	Nominated	
2018	Best Direction, Drama Series	Holly Dale (episode: "The River Styx")	Won	
2018	Best Writing, Drama Series	Tara Armstrong (episode: "Bloody Mary")	Nominated	
2018	Best Writing, Drama Series	Marsha Greene (episode: "Wave the White Flag")	Nominated	
2018	Best Achievement in Casting	Susan Forrest, Sharon Forrest	Nominated	
2018	Best Lead Actor, Drama Series	Richard Short	Nominated	
2018	Best Supporting Actor, Drama Series	Greg Bryk	Nominated	
2018	Best Lead Actress, Drama Series	Caroline Dhavernas	Nominated	
2018	Best Guest Performance, Drama Series	Steven McCarthy (episode: "The Judas Cradle")	Won	
