= Nurses (Canadian TV series) =

Canadian TV series

- Genre: Medical drama
- Starring: Tiera Skovbye; Natasha Calis; Jordan Johnson-Hinds; Sandy Sidhu; Donald Maclean Jr.
- Country of origin: Canada
- Original language: English
- No. of seasons: 2
- No. of episodes: 20

Production
- Executive producers: Ilana Frank; Linda Pope; Vanessa Piazza; Adam Pettle; Jocelyn Hamilton; Tassie Cameron; Julie Puckrin
- Production locations: Toronto, Ontario, Canada
- Production companies: ICF Films; eOne Canada; Corus Entertainment

Original release
- Network: Global
- Release: January 6, 2020 – August 29, 2021

Nurses is a Canadian drama television series that premiered on Global on January 6, 2020. Nurses was created by much of the same team behind the series Rookie Blue, including Ilana Frank, Adam Pettle, Vanessa Piazza and Tassie Cameron. The series was renewed for a second season by Global in early 2020.

NBC ran the first season in the United States beginning on December 7, 2020, due to the shortage of programs during the lockdowns from the COVID-19 pandemic in the United States, but did not pick up the second season. In March 2023, it was confirmed that the series had been cancelled by Global and NBC.

== Premise ==
The series centers on a group of nurses at a busy downtown Toronto hospital.

== Cast and characters ==
=== Main ===
- Tiera Skovbye as Grace Knight
- Natasha Calis as Ashley Collins
- Jordan Johnson-Hinds as Keon Colby
- Sandy Sidhu as Nazneen Khan
- Donald Maclean Jr. as Wolf Burke

=== Recurring ===
- Cathy White as Sinead O'Rourke
- Ryan-James Hatanaka as Dr. Evan Wallace
- Tristan D. Lalla as Damien Sanders
- Nicola Correia-Damude as Dr. Vanessa Banks
- Raymond Ablack as Kabir Pavan
- Alexandra Ordolis as Caro
- Trish Fagan as Dr. Rori Niven
- Peter Stebbings as Dr. Thomas Hamilton
- Ryan Blakely as Red
- Jordan Connor as Matteo Rey
- Rachael Ancheril as Kate Faulkner
- Katie Uhlmann as Candy Kemper
- Matt Gordon as Dr. Mike Goldwyn
- Humberly González as Dr. Ivy Turcotte

== Production ==
The series is produced by Corus Entertainment, which partnered with ICF Films and eOne in association with Piazza Entertainment. It was renewed for a second season by Global, which went into production in March 2020. As of October 2022, there had yet to be an announcement for a third season. In March 2023, it was announced that the series had been quietly cancelled according to TVSeriesFinale.com, and the show ending production with no further renewal announcements made by Global or NBC for a third season.

== Episodes ==
=== Series overview ===
Season	Episodes	Originally released	
Season	Episodes	First released	Last released
1	10	January 6, 2020	March 20, 2020
2	10	June 21, 2021	August 29, 2021

=== Season 1 (2020) ===
No. overall	No. in season	Title	Directed by	Written by	Original release date	Prod. code	Canadian viewers (millions)
1	1	"Incoming"	Ken Girotti	Adam Pettle	January 6, 2020	363634-1	1.26
Grace Knight struggles with an ethical dilemma when she realizes, after several patients are brought in following a vehicle-ramming attack, that the patient she is treating was the attacker. Keon Colby bonds with a single pregnant woman and helps her feel less lonely. Ashley Collins learns that working in a hospital is not all excitement when she is assigned to directing calls. Wolf Burke spends the whole shift tracking down the patient whose severed fingers are in his possession. Nazneen Khan spends time with the mother of a brain-dead patient.
2	2	"Undisclosed Conditions"	Ken Girotti	Julie Puckrin	January 13, 2020	363634-2	1.09
Grace struggles with the ethical implications of keeping a patient's condition from her family. Keon is reunited with an old college friend whose wife he is treating, which brings up old memories. Wolfe tries to get through to a teenaged girl by revealing a secret of his own. Naz is embarrassed about her upbringing, which left her lacking in certain skills. Ashley becomes antagonistic toward Grace and finally discovers why she was fired from her previous job.
3	3	"Friday Night Legend"	Kelly Makin	Renee St. Cyr	January 20, 2020	363634-3	0.96
Ashley struggles after losing her first patient. Naz tries to get through to a patient who refuses medical treatment to preserve her career. With the help of Keon, Grace identifies a John Doe patient who is acting violently. Grace finds out that a hospital merger in the city might force her to work with someone who caused her great trauma.
4	4	"Chrysalis"	Kelly Makin	Eilis Kirwan	January 27, 2020	363634-4	N/A
Grace mediates between a patient's partner and son while adjusting to the unwanted arrival of the new hospital CEO.
5	5	"What Size Are Your Feet?" "Critical Care"	Jordan Canning	Seneca Aaron	February 3, 2020	363634-5	N/A
As Dr. Hamilton makes his presence felt at St. Mary's, Grace is catapulted into a high-stakes medical procedure, while trying to protect Naz from a dangerous situation.
6	6	"Risky Behaviour"	Winnifred Jong	Anusree Roy	February 10, 2020	363634-6	N/A
As Grace cares for a patient consumed by grief she's forced to confront her own fears.
7	7	"Lifeboat"	Sherry White	Eilis Kirwan & Renee St. Cyr	February 17, 2020	363634-7	N/A
Ashley and Caro explore past relationships and contemplate their own future. Meanwhile, Naz tries to balance her emotional connection to a patient with his medical needs.
8	8	"Achilles Heel"	Grant Harvey	Laura Good	February 24, 2020	363634-8	N/A
A young Hasidic Jewish patient is in need of bone graft from a deceased donor after suffering a leg injury playing basketball.
9	9	"Mirror Box"	Stephanie Morgenstern	Julie Puckrin	March 2, 2020	363634-9	N/A
As she assists a patient that is quarantined from the rest of the hospital, Grace makes a major discovery in the fight against Dr Hamilton.
10	10	"Lady Business"	Grant Harvey	Adam Pettle & Lee Piazza	March 9, 2020	363634-10	N/A
As the battle against Dr Hamilton reaches its climax, Grace cares for an Instagram celebrity whose upcoming operation strikes at the core of her identity.

=== Season 2 (2021) ===
No. overall	No. in season	Title	Directed by	Written by	Original release date	Prod. code	Canadian viewers (millions)
11	1	"A Thousand Battles"	Kelly Makin	Patrick Tarr	June 21, 2021	363634-17	0.68
A hospital is a battlefield, as our 5 favorite nurses attack another season. But there's a new general in town - nurse manager Kate Faulkner, who's going to give them all a run for their money.
12	2	"Chaos Magnet"	Thom Best	Adam Pettle	June 28, 2021	363634-16	N/A
It's a typically crazy day at St Mary's when an Amber Alert rings out, but unbeknownst to our nurses the perpetrator and the abducted child are in the hospital.
13	3	"Night Moves"	Winnifred Jong	Ley Lukins	July 5, 2021	363634-20	N/A
Hospitals are no stranger to the things that keep us up at night or the secrets we keep, as the strange gets stranger on the night shift at St Mary's.
14	4	"It's Showtime"	Kelly Makin	Anusree Roy	July 18, 2021	363634-26	0.53
A high-profile surgical case brings Grace and Ashley into conflict over whether or not the surgeon is capable of performing the surgery.
15	5	"Code Orange"	Winnifred Jong	Julie Puckrin	July 25, 2021	363634-25	0.58
When a tragic accident at a concert suddenly puts St Mary's in a Code Orange, our nurses will realise how important it is to have someone in your corner, because no one should be alone.
16	6	"Ghosts"	Jordan Canning	Seneca Aaron	August 1, 2021	363634-18	0.56
Ghosts from the past make a day at St Mary's especially trying for our nurses as they're each confronted by people or things they tried to leave behind.
17	7	"Prima Facie"	Chell Stephen	Eilis Kirwan	August 8, 2021	363634-24	0.62
It's Nursing Week and St Mary's nurses and patients alike are confronted by the fact that everyone has a hidden side, and that nothing can be taken at face value.
18	8	"Best Day Ever"	John Fawcett	Laura Good & Hayden Simpson	August 15, 2021	363634-19	0.59
Assigned to the Burn Unit, Naz and Grace are pushed to their limits as Nurses - and friends - when they disagree over how to deal with a critically burned patient who's in danger of losing his will to live.
19	9	"The Wish Factory"	Cory Bowles	Patrick Tarr	August 22, 2021	363634-22	0.53
With uncertainty in their personal lives and a pandemic on the horizon, our nurses each deal with people longing for wishes to come true for their health or their loved ones, but they're wishes that may not be in the power of a nurse to grant.
20	10	"Struck"	John Fawcett	Adam Pettle	August 29, 2021	363634-23	0.50
With both patients and the whole Healthcare system on the brink of tragic events, the St Mary's nursing team must put their own struggles aside to help those with everything on the line.

== Broadcast ==
The series premiered on January 6, 2020, on Global in Canada.

From May 2020, the series was broadcast by Net5 in the Netherlands.

On November 10, 2020, Nurses was picked up by NBC in the United States for a December 7, 2020 premiere.

The series debuted in Romania on the channel Diva on September 20, 2020, under the title "Asistenți medicali".

The series premiered in September 2021 exclusively on Globoplay in Brazil.

== Controversy over "Achilles Heel" episode ==
The show's portrayal of Hasidic Jews in a plotline of the "Achilles Heel" episode was labeled as antisemitic by members of the Jewish community. In the episode, when the Hasidic Jewish patient is checked in for his leg injury, the patient's father objects to who the dead donor's bone graft might come from (along with his son participating in sports, in an extreme portrayal of a Hasidic archetype) and says "a goyim leg. From anyone. An Arab, a woman?" The patient then refuses the bone graft procedure. In reality, Jewish law has no objections or prohibitions against such a procedure.

Seffi Kogen of the American Jewish Committee called the scene 'the most antisemitic thing I have ever seen in a TV show", and that Jewish law "puts precedent on healing and saving lives [and] there is no prohibition on the kind of bone graft in this clip." B'nai Brith Canada said the portrayal "perpetuates false and dangerous antisemitic stereotypes" and called for the producers to apologize. The Simon Wiesenthal Center said in a statement, "the writers of this scene check all the boxes of ignorance and pernicious negative stereotypes" and that "Orthodox Jews are targeted for violent hate crimes – in the city of New York, Jews are number one target of hate crimes in US; this is no slip of the tongue. It was a vile, cheap attack masquerading as TV drama."

In response, NBC pulled the episode from their digital platforms. The episode was also removed domestically in Canada by Global parent company Corus from Global's website and viewing apps, with no plans to air it in repeats in the future.
