= The Eleventh Hour (Canadian TV series) =

Canadian drama TV series (2002–2005)

- Also known as: Bury the Lead (U.S.)
- Genre: Drama
- Created by: Semi Chellas; Ilana Frank
- Written by: Semi Chellas; Esta Spalding; Tassie Cameron; Frank Borg; Sean Reycraft; Peter Wellington; Karen Walton; Morwyn Brebner
- Directed by: David Wellington; Kelly Makin; Philip Earnshaw; T.W. Peacocke; Graeme Campbell; Milan Cheylov; Stephen Reynolds
- Starring: Shawn Doyle; Waneta Storms; Jeff Seymour; Sonja Smits; Ben Bass
- Country of origin: Canada
- No. of seasons: 3
- No. of episodes: 39

Production
- Executive producers: Ilana Frank; Semi Chellas; David Wellington
- Running time: 60 min.
- Production company: Alliance Atlantis

Original release
- Network: CTV
- Release: November 26, 2002 – March 26, 2005

The Eleventh Hour is a Canadian television drama series which aired weekly on CTV from 2002 to 2005.

The show revolves around the reporters and producers at a fictional television news magazine series, The Eleventh Hour. Unhappy with the newsmagazine's shrinking audience, the network has brought in a new executive producer, Kennedy Marsh, to reorient the show in a more ratings-driven tabloid journalism direction.

The tension between the ratings imperative and the more traditional journalistic ethics of the show's senior staff is the primary conflict that drives the show, but storylines also include the team's efforts to get the stories that will make it to air each week.

The Eleventh Hour was produced by Alliance Atlantis, Canada's largest film and television production house. It aired in the United States on Sleuth, under the title Bury the Lead, to distinguish it from a CBS series with a similar name.

== Ratings ==
Although the show started off poorly in the Canadian television ratings, attracting an average of just 400,000 viewers each week, its audience during the start of its 2004 season was sufficiently high that CTV ordered a third season. However, ratings did not improve further. The third season, already ordered, aired irregularly on Saturday nights with very little promotion, and proved to be its last. The final season also received a Best Dramatic Series Gemini Award despite the cancellation.

The Eleventh Hour was the latest in a lengthy line of drama series at CTV which had high-profile launches but were quickly marginalized to little-watched weekend timeslots and ultimately cancelled. However, it outlasted several other recent CTV dramas, including Power Play, The City, and The Associates, which each lasted two seasons.

The show's theme song for season 3 is "Weapon", by Matthew Good.

== Cast ==
- Sonja Smits as correspondent Megan Redner
- Shawn Doyle as producer Dennis Langley
- Waneta Storms as producer Isobel Lambert
- Tanya Reid as executive producer Kennedy Marsh
- Jeff Seymour as correspondent Kamal Azizi
- Peter MacNeill as network news head Warren Donohue
- Inga Cadranel as researcher Brooke Fairburn
- Scott McCord as researcher James Joy
- Matt Gordon as legal counsel Murray Dann
- Jonas Chernick as editor Gavin Kowalchuk
- John Neville as interviewer Deaton Hill

== Main Crew ==
- Creators: Semi Chellas, Ilana Frank
- Executive Producers: Ilana Frank, Semi Chellas, David Wellington
- Directors: David Wellington, Kelly Makin, Philip Earnshaw, T.W. Peacocke, Graeme Campbell, Milan Cheylov, Stephen Reynolds
- Writers: Semi Chellas, Esta Spalding, Tassie Cameron, Frank Borg, Sean Reycraft, Peter Wellington, Karen Walton, Morwyn Brebner

== Awards and nominations ==
The show was nominated for 14 Gemini Awards in 2003, and won for Best Dramatic Series, Best Actor in a Leading Role (Seymour) and Best Supporting Actor (MacNeill).

The show was nominated for Best Dramatic Series Gemini Awards again in 2004. In 2005, the show won Gemini Awards for Best Dramatic Series and for Best Writing for Semi Chellas and Tassie Cameron.

== Episode list ==
=== Season 1 ===
1. Mad As Hatters
2. I'm Mad As Hell
3. The Source
4. A Low, Dishonest Decade
5. Tree Hugger
6. A Modern Mata Hari
7. Not Without My Reefer
8. The 37-Year Itch
9. Don't Have a Cow
10. Shelter
11. Cell Phone Slaves
12. The RASH Troops of Error
13. Hall of Mirrors

=== Season 2 ===
1. Cowboy
2. Stormy Petrel
3. Hard Seven
4. Swimmers
5. Wonderland
6. Gone Baby Gone
7. Nadir
8. Rather Be Wrong
9. Georgia
10. I'll Build Me An Island
11. Strange Bedfellows
12. The Revenge Specialist
13. The Missionary Position

=== Season 3 ===
1. Eden
2. In Spite of All the Damage
3. Megan Ice Cream
4. Bedfellas
5. A Virgin Walks into a Bar
6. ZUGZWANG
7. Hit Delete
8. Kettle Black
9. In Another Life
10. The Miracle Worker
11. Special Delivery
12. Das Bootcamp
13. Bumpy Cover
