= PUK =

PUK may refer to:

== Geographical ==
- PUK, or Busan–Gyeongnam Area, a metropolitan area in South Korea

== Political ==
- Partia e Unitetit Kombëtar or National Unity Party, an Albanian political party
- Patriotic Union of Kurdistan, a Kurdish political party

== Technological ==
- Personal unblocking key, a code used in mobile phones
- PUK welding, a precision welding system used in the jewellery industry

== People ==
- Niels Kristian Iversen or PUK, Danish speedway-rider

== See also ==
- Puck (disambiguation)
