= Puck =

Puck may refer to:

== Objects ==
- Hockey puck, the cylinder which is hit, in ice hockey and related games, analogously to the ball hit in field hockey
- Puck (digitizer), a graphics tablet accessory
- Puck, the coffee grounds inside an espresso machine portafilter
- Puck, an injection-molded carrier that stabilizes products on a conveyor line
- Shaving puck, another name for shaving soap
- Urinal puck, another name for a urinal deodorizer block

== Characters ==
- Puck (folklore), a trickster character of folk tales
  - Puck (folklore) § Notable cultural references lists eponymous derivatives, including
    - Puck (A Midsummer Night's Dream), a character from Shakespeare's A Midsummer Night's Dream
- Puck (Marvel Comics), the codename of two Marvel characters
- Puck (Glee), from the musical comedy-drama Glee
- Puck (Love Birds), youngest penguin from the musical Love Birds
- Peter Puck, a hockey puck-shaped cartoon character
- Puck, a character from the Berserk manga and anime series
- Puck (Re:Zero), a character in the light novel series Re:Zero − Starting Life in Another World
- Puck, a non-playable character in the video game Final Fantasy IX
- Puck, a playable character in the video game Dota 2
- Baron Puck, in the 1867 opéra bouffe La Grande-Duchesse de Gérolstein
- Prince Puck, in the 2016 comic book series Empress from Icon Comics
- Puck, a mouse and a background character in the animated franchise Hoops & Yoyo
- Puck Man, the original name for the arcade game Pac-Man
  - PUCK, a character based on the original name in the video game Shadow Labyrinth, and in an episode of the animated series Secret Level

== Literature and media ==
- Puck (magazine), an 1871–1918 humor publication
- Puck (literary magazine), a 1990s publication
- Puck (media company), a digital media company launched in 2021
- Puck, a novel by Ouida

== Places ==
- Puck County, Poland
  - Puck, Poland, a town and the county seat
  - Gmina Puck, a gmina or administrative division
  - Puck railway station
- Puck (moon), a moon of Uranus
- Bay of Puck, in the Baltic Sea

== Other uses ==
- Puck (name), including a list of people with the name
- Puck (opera), an opéra-féerique which premiered in 1949
- Puck Building, a Manhattan landmark
- Puck Fair, an Irish festival
- Puck App, a mobile application that allows hockey players to quickly find and rent a hockey goalie
- Puck puzzle, a combination puzzle invented in 1980 by Hungarian physicist András Végh
- Puck, a cheese brand by Arla Foods
- Puck (fish), a genus of dreamer deep-water fish
