= Adam Pettle =

Canadian writer and radio producer

- Born: 1973 (age 52–53); Toronto
- Education: National Theatre School of Canada, Montreal, Canada. Dalhousie University, Halifax, Canada.
- Occupations: Writer, producer, playwright
- Spouse: Patricia Fagan (2 children)
- Writing career
- Notable works: Saving Hope, Rookie Blue, King

Adam Pettle (born 1973) is a Canadian playwright, radio producer, and television writer, most noted as the showrunner and executive producer on the CTV and Ion Television hospital drama Saving Hope.

== Biography ==
=== Theatre ===
Born in Toronto in 1973, Pettle is a graduate of the National Theatre School of Canada's (NTS) playwriting program. He received a BA in theatre from Dalhousie University in 1994.

His first play, Therac 25 (1995), is autobiographical – Pettle received extensive treatment for thyroid cancer in the early 1990s. It stages a developing romance in the halls of a cancer treatment unit. His next drama, Zadie's Shoes (2000), is one of the few Canadian plays to successfully transfer from a medium-size house (The Factory Theatre) to the commercial Winter Garden Theatre. It has been produced across Canada as well as in the US and the UK.

Zadie's Shoes, Sunday Father and Therac 25 have all been nominated for Dora Awards for best new play.

=== Television and radio ===
In 2006, Pettle began his move towards television writing, penning an original pilot Clean for Ilana Frank and Thump Inc (now ICF Films). He has since worked on several Canadian and American television series, including Combat Hospital, King, Rookie Blue, X Company, and Saving Hope. He was nominated a Gemini Award in 2010 for a Rookie Blue episode entitled "Big Nickel," co-written with Morwyn Brebner. He is credited as a co-producer on King and executive producer on Saving Hope.

Pettle is also co-creator and head writer of the miniseries Afghanada, heard on CBC Radio.

=== Personal life ===
He is married to Patricia Fagan. They have two children, Alice and Lev Pettle.

== Work ==
=== Plays ===
Year	Title	Notes
1995	Therac 25	Dora Award Nominee for Best New Play.
2000	Zadie's Shoes	Dora Award Nominee for Best New Play.
2002	Sunday Father	Dora Award Nominee for Best New Play.
2002	Misha	One Act Play
2002	The Tragic Role	Adaptation of Anton Chekhov's play for Soulpepper Theatre.
2003	Mosley and Me	
2006	Rattle the Bones	
2009	Parfumerie	Adaption Miklos Laszlo's romantic comedy, co-written by Brenda Robins for Soulpepper.

=== Television ===
==== Production staff ====
Year	Title	Role	Notes
2011	Combat Hospital	Executive Story Editor	Season 1
2011–2012	Rookie Blue	Executive Story Editor	Season 1 and 2
2012	King	Co-Producer	Season 2
2012	Saving Hope	Co-executive producer	Seasons 1
2013 – 2017	Saving Hope	Executive Producer	Season 2 – 4
2015 – 2017	Saving Hope	Showrunner	Season 4
2015	X Company	Story Consultant	Season 1
2020	Nurses		

==== Writer ====
Year	Show	Season	Episode	Original airdate	Notes
2010	Rookie Blue	1	"Honour Roll"	August 12, 2010	
2010	Rookie Blue	1	"Big Nickel"	August 26, 2010	Co-written with Morwyn Brebner. Nominated for a Gemini Award.
2011	Combat Hospital	1	"Hells Bells"	July 19, 2011	
2011	Rookie Blue	2	"Brotherhood"	August 19, 2011	
2012	King	2	"Josh Simpson"	March 7, 2012	
2012	King	2	"Isabelle Toomey"	April 20, 2012	Co-written with Morwyn Brebner.
2012	Saving Hope	1	"Blindness"	June 21, 2012	
2012	Saving Hope	1	"Heartsick"	July 26, 2012	Co-written with Morwyn Brebner.
2012	Saving Hope	1	"Ride Hard or Go Home"	September 6, 2012	
2013	Saving Hope	2	"Little Piggies"	July 2, 2013	
2013	Saving Hope	2	"Vamonos"	August 20, 2013	Co-written with Amanda Fahey.
2014	Saving Hope	2	"Twinned Lambs"	February 20, 2014	
2014	Saving Hope	3	"Kiss Me Goodbye (Part 2)"	September 25, 2014	
2015	Saving Hope	3	"Narrow Margin"	January 14, 2015	Co-written with Morwyn Brebner.
2015	Saving Hope	3	"Fearless"	February 11, 2015	
2015	Saving Hope	4	"Sympathy for the Devil"	September 24, 2015	
2015	Saving Hope	4	"Waiting on a Friend"	November 12, 2015	Co-written with Graeme Stewart.
2016	Saving Hope	4	"Let Me Go"	February 14, 2016	
2016	Saving Hope	5	"Doctor Dustiny"	TBD	
2016	Saving Hope	5	"Leap of Faith"	TBD	Co-written with Hayden Simpson.
2016	Saving Hope	5	"We Need to Talk About Charlie Harries"	TBD	Co-written with Graeme Stewart.
2016	Saving Hope	5	"Hope Never Dies"	TBD	
