= Rent-a-Goalie =

- Created by: Christopher Bolton
- Developed by: Christopher Bolton & Graeme Manson
- Starring: Christopher Bolton; Phillip Riccio; Inga Cadranel; Mayko Nguyen; Jeremy Wright; Carlos Diaz
- Country of origin: Canada
- No. of seasons: 3
- No. of episodes: 26

Production
- Running time: 22 minutes

Original release
- Network: Showcase
- Release: October 1, 2006 – December 8, 2008

Rent-a-Goalie is a half-hour comedy television series from Canada that aired on Showcase from 2006 to 2008. The first season was nominated for three Gemini Awards, including Best Comedy Series. It was also nominated for a Directors Guild of Canada Award, the CFTPA Indie Award for Best Comedy Series, an ACTRA Award for Best Male Performance for Christopher Bolton, and four Canadian Comedy Awards, winning two. The second season was nominated for six Gemini Awards, including Best Comedy Series, Best Ensemble Performance, Best Directing, Best Writing, Best Cinematography and Best Casting. It has also been nominated for three Canadian Comedy Awards.

== Plot ==
Rent-a-Goalie follows Cake (Christopher Bolton), a hockey-mad, recovered-from-everything go-to guy, who runs a rag-tag hockey goalie rental service from Cafe Primo, a family-owned coffee shop in Toronto's Little Italy. Here, at this crazy crossroads of hockey culture and coffee culture, Cake has finally found a home. He spends his time juggling friends and enemies, the ridiculous and the profound, while always trying to live by "The Code" – an ever-evolving set of personal ethics, spiritual maxims and athletic credos that keep him on the straight and narrow.

== Cast ==
- Christopher Bolton as Cake
- Louis Di Bianco - Johnny
- Sarain Boylan - Malta
- Stephen Amell as Billy
- Inga Cadranel as Francesca
- Oliver Becker as O'Malley
- Philip Riccio as Puker
- Mayko Nguyen as Goth Girl (Stuart)
- Jeremy Wright as Short Bus
- Carlos Diaz as Looch
- Joe Pingue as Joey Almost
- Matt Gordon as Doc
- Gabriel Hogan as Lance
- Pascal Petardi as Shit Pants
- Jeff Pustil as Gordie the Reff
- Maria Vacratsis as Councillor Melanie Firstman
- Ashley Newbrough as Dallas

== Episode list ==
=== Season 1 ===
- E01 The Arrivalist
- E02 The Irish are Fags
- E03 Malta
- E04 Blue Balls
- E05 Bar Code
- E06 Shit Zone
- E07 Going to the Chapel
- E08 Fire in the Hole

=== Season 2 ===
- E01 The Voucher
- E02 A Gazebo of One's Own
- E03 Domi Daze
- E04 Burlington
- E05 Everybody's a Fag
- E06 Nickname Lockout
- E07 Rabies Almost
- E08 Gnarsty Snarch
- E09 B-Boys
- E10 Texas

=== Season 3 ===
- E01 Upstairs
- E02 Ham in a Pram
- E03 Internetstopper
- E04 Eva Has a Dot Dot Dot
- E05 Two Letters
- E06 He-Man
- E07 The Cheesemaker's Oath
- E08 Shite Storm

== Home media ==
On March 4, 2008, Alliance Home Entertainment released the complete first season on DVD in Canada.

All 3 seasons are available on iTunes.

== Rent a Goalie App ==
The TV show Rent-a-Goalie provided the idea to make renting a hockey goalie a reality. Several small businesses have opened up to allow recreational hockey teams to easily find and rent hockey goalies for their game. A recent example is Puck App. Another example is MyPuck, which offers an app for the Apple App Store and Google Play Store.
