= Esta Spalding =

American author, screenwriter and poet

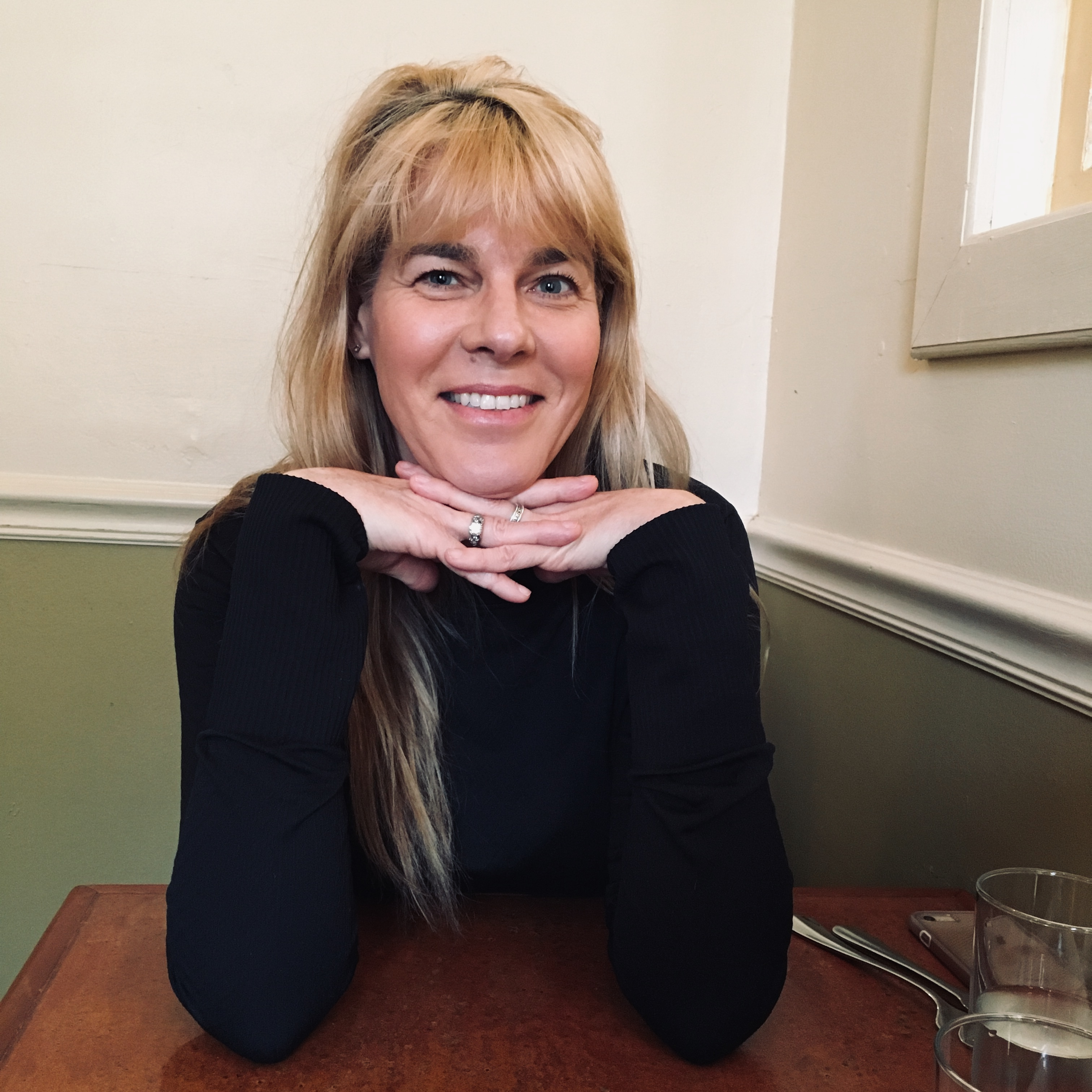

Esta Alice Spalding is an American author, screenwriter and poet who won the Pat Lowther Award in 2004 for Lost August. She has lived in Culver City, California.

== Early life and education ==
Born in Boston, Massachusetts, to Phillip Spalding and Linda Spalding (who later married Canadian novelist Michael Ondaatje), she grew up in Hawaii. She has a B.A. from the University of Chicago and an M.A. from Stanford University.

== Career ==
In 1997, Spalding relocated to Vancouver, British Columbia, where she worked as an executive story editor and writer on CBC Television's prime-time drama Da Vinci's Inquest. She also worked as a writer and executive story editor on all three seasons of The Eleventh Hour, a prime-time drama about investigative journalists on CTV. Both series were highly critically acclaimed and repeatedly won Gemini awards for Best Series.

Spalding and her mother Linda Spalding co-wrote a novel, Mere, which was published in 2001. In 2016, Spalding published a children's book series that includes Look Out for the Fitzgerald-Trouts, Knock About with the Fitzgerald-Trouts, and Shout Out for the Fitzgerald-Trouts.

Spalding adapted Barbara Gowdy's novel Falling Angels into a 2003 feature film that was directed by Scott Smith. The movie premiered at the Toronto International Film Festival and played at Sundance Film Festival, and garnered many awards and nominations, including a Genie nod for Best Writing for Spalding. That year, she also co-wrote (with Deepa Mehta) the script adaptation of Carol Shields' Republic of Love, which Mehta directed. Her 2007 original movie of the week, In God's Country, broke records for viewership on CTV. She and Tassie Cameron co-wrote the script for Would Be Kings, a movie of the week that premiered on CTV in 2008 to great critical acclaim and for which they were nominated for the Gemini award for Best Writing. She has been a writer and producing consultant on Flashpoint, Rookie Blue, Being Erica, Bomb Girls and Saving Hope, for which she was nominated for a Writers Guild Award and 19-2, for which she was nominated for a Canadian Screenwriting Award. She was a writer and co-producer on FX's The Bridge, and a writer and supervising producer on CBS' Battle Creek before moving on to Showtime's Masters of Sex as a writer and co-executive producer.

Spalding was the showrunner for Showtime's On Becoming a God in Central Florida. She was also a writer and executive producer on Freeform's Party of Five. Her feature film The Last Letter from Your Lover (co-written with Nick Payne) based on the novel by Jojo Moyes will premiere on Netflix in July 2021.She is a contributing editor to the literary magazine Brick.

In 2023, Spalding was the showrunner for AMC's Anne Rice's Mayfair Witches.

== Bibliography ==
- Shout Out for the Fitzgerald-Trouts - 2019 ISBN 978-0735264519
- Knock About with the Fitzgerald-Trouts - 2017 ISBN 978-0316298605
- Look Out for the Fitzgerald-Trouts - 2016 ISBN 978-0-31629-858-2
- The Wife's Account - 2004 ISBN 978-0-88784-675-5
- Carrying Place - 1995
- Anchoress - 1997 ISBN 0-88784-591-6
- Lost August - 1999
- Lost Classics - 2000 ISBN 0-676-97299-3 (edited with Michael Redhill, Michael Ondaatje and Linda Spalding)
- Mere - 2001 ISBN 0-00-225538-3
