= Ilana Frank =

- Occupation: Film producer

Ilana C. Frank is a Canadian film and television producer and founder of ICF Films (formerly Thump Inc.), best known for producing the award-winning series The Eleventh Hour, Rookie Blue, and Saving Hope. The Eleventh Hour, which she executively produced and co-created, won the Canadian Screen Award for Best Dramatic Series in 2003 and 2005, and was nominated for over 30 Gemini Awards, winning in all major categories.

== Life and career ==
Frank has a background in theater. Frank worked for several years producing theatrical plays before steering her career towards film and television producing. In the mid-1980s she joined Norstar Entertainment, a Toronto-based production and distribution company, as VP of Production, where she oversaw the work on over 20 feature films. She met her ex-husband, actor Maury Chaykin, on the set of a play called Tony's Woman, they divorced in 1993. She received an award from the Writers Guild of Canada (WGC) in 2007 for mentoring Canadian talent.

== Filmography as producer ==
=== Television credits ===
- The Eleventh Hour (2002-2005)
- Would Be Kings (2008)
- Clean (2008)
- Rookie Blue (2010 - 2015)
- Saving Hope (2012–present)
- The Detail (2018–present)
- Nurses (2019–present)

=== Motion picture credits ===
- Mania: The Intruder (TV Movie) (1986)
- Bullies (1986)
- High Stakes (1986)
- Prom Night II (1987)
- Blindside (1987)
- Higher Education (1988)
- Norman's Awesome Experience (1988)
- Cold Comfort (1989)
- Prom Night III: The Last Kiss (1990)
- Oh, What a Night (1992)
- Liar's Edge (1992)
- Blown Away (1993)
- Cold Sweat (1993)
- The Club (1994)
- Boulevard (1994)
- Jungleground (1995)
- Salt Water Moose (1996)
- Pale Saints (1997)
- No Contest II (1997)
- Men with Guns (1997)
- The Life Before This (1999)
- Of Murder and Memory (TV Movie) (2008)
- Something Red (also Director and Writer) (2011)
- Method (short film) (2013)
- Parachute (short film) (2014)
- The Offer (short film (2015)
