= Puck (name) =

Puck is a Dutch and English given name and nickname for other names. It is derived from the Old English puca, referring to a mischievous household spirit or nature sprite. It is a popular name for girls in the Netherlands. Puck is a character in William Shakespeare’s A Midsummer Night’s Dream. As a surname, it has multiple possible origins.

Notable people named Puck include:

== Given name ==
=== Women ===
- Puck de Leeuw (1953–2002), Dutch director
- Puck Moonen (born 1996), Dutch cyclist riding for Lotto–Soudal Ladies
- Puck Pieterse (born 2002), Dutch cyclist specializing in cyclo-cross and mountain biking riding for team Alpecin–Deceuninck.

== Surname ==
- Eva Puck (1892–1979), American vaudeville star and Broadway and film actress
- Gerfried Puck (born 1973), Austrian show jumping rider
- Theodore Puck (1916–2005), American geneticist
- Wolfgang Puck (born 1949), Austrian celebrity chef and restaurateur

== Nickname ==
- Bertha "Puck" Brouwer (1930–2006), Dutch sprinter
- Maria Petronella "Puck" Oversloot (1914–2009), Dutch swimmer
- Gerardus Henricus "Puck" van Heel (1904–1984), Dutch footballer
- David Edward "Puck" Rainey (born 1968), American reality TV personality

== Stage name ==
- Puck Dupp (born 1967), ring name for American wrestler Marty Garner
