= T. W. Peacocke =

Canadian television and film director (born 1960)

T.W. Peacocke
- Born: 1960 (age 65–66); Pittsburgh, Pennsylvania, United States
- Notable work: Canada Russia '72
- Spouse: Amanda Pieris (m. 2010)

T.W. Peacocke (born 1960) is a Canadian television and film director.

== Background ==
Peacocke was born in Pittsburgh, Pennsylvania, and raised in Canada, and holds citizenship of both the United States and Canada. He graduated from Université de Caen, France, then attended Yale University, where he graduated magna cum laude in 1983. He later studied at New York University Tisch School of the Arts between 1983 and 1984.Peacocke is well-known in the Canadian television industry, and has directed episodes of Madison, Cold Squad, Blue Murder, Traders and Made in Canada.

He has won two Canadian Comedy Awards for Best Direction of a television series (for Made in Canada in 2002 and Rent-a-Goalie in 2007) and a Gemini Award for Best Direction in a Comedy Program - Rent-a-Goalie in 2008).

He has directed more than 200 episodes of over 30 different television series, including Schitt's Creek, Rookie Blue, Heartland, The Border, M.V.P. (which he also produced), Rent-a-Goalie, Show Me Yours, The Eleventh Hour, Blue Murder (on which he also served as creative consultant), Mutant X, Made in Canada, Cold Squad, Amazon, Traders, North of 60, The Rez, Black Harbour, The Crow: Stairway to Heaven, Jake and the Kid, Madison, Beast Wars: Transformers, and The Odyssey. He also directed the four-hour television mini-series, Canada Russia '72, for which he received a Best Director Gemini Award nomination.

He has appeared as an actor numerous times, in episodes of Rent-a-Goalie, Traders, Madison, and Canada Russia '72, in which he played the captain of the Soviet hockey team, Victor Kuzkin.

== Recognition ==
- 2008
  - Gemini Award for Best Direction in a Comedy Program - Rent-a-Goalie - Won
- 2007
  - Directors Guild of Canada DGC Team Award for Television Series - Comedy - Rent-a-Goalie - Nominated (shared with Ian Brock (production designer), Don Cassidy (editor), Karen McGarroch (second assistant director), George Jeffery (first assistant director), Jeremy Hood (production coordinator), Paul Jennison (production accountant), John MacNeil (art director)), episode The Arrivalist - Nominated
- 2007
  - Canadian Comedy Award Direction Series - Rent-a-Goalie - Won
- 2006
  - Gemini Award for Best Direction in a Dramatic Program or Mini-Series - Canada Russia '72 - Nominated
- 2006
  - Directors Guild of Canada DGC Team Award for Television Movie or Mini-Series Canada Russia '72 - Nominated (shared with Ray Lorenz (production designer), Dean Soltys (editor), George Jeffery (first assistant director), etc. - Nominated.
- 2002
  - Canadian Comedy Award Canadian Comedy Award Television - Pretty Funny Direction - Series - Made in Canada - Won (shared)
- 1999
  - Gemini Award for Best Direction in a Dramatic Series - Traders - Nominated
- 1996
  - Leo Award for best Direction in a Television Series - North of 60 - Nominated.
