= Puck App =

Mobile application

Puck App is a mobile application that allows hockey players to quickly find and rent a hockey goalie. Founded in 2015 in Toronto, the application primarily operates throughout Canada. It is available on Apple's App Store and Google Play.

== History ==
Puck App was founded in 2016 by Niki Sawni. Users can rate the goalies, message with available goalies, and coordinate skill levels. In 2017, Puck App expanded to Western Canada and has over 1,000 goalies registered. In 2018, Puck App charged approximately $40 CDN to rent a goalie with more than 2 hours notice.

Previously, Puck App was a competitor to a similar application called GoalieUp. As of 2024, both companies have agreed to a merger deal.
