= Paul Fox (director) =

Canadian film and television director

Paul Fox is a Canadian film and television director from Toronto, Ontario. He is most noted for his 2006 film Everything's Gone Green, which was the winner of the award for Best Canadian Film at the 2006 Vancouver International Film Festival, and as a Canadian Screen Award winner for Best Direction in a Comedy Series for his work on Schitt's Creek.

A graduate of the School of Visual Arts and the Canadian Film Centre, he directed short films and episodes of television series such as Cold Squad, The Associates, Drop the Beat and Degrassi: The Next Generation, and had a number of film editing credits, before releasing his debut feature, The Dark Hours, in 2005. Everything's Gone Green followed in 2006, premiering at the 2006 Toronto International Film Festival.

He has not released any further feature films, but has continued to direct television films and series. His credits have included episodes of The Listener, Haven, Bitten, Republic of Doyle, Rookie Blue, This Life, Frontier, Workin' Moms, Coroner, Ransom, Little Mosque on the Prairie, Mary Kills People, Anne with an E, SurrealEstate, Murdoch Mysteries and The Lake.

In addition to his Canadian Screen Award win at the 4th Canadian Screen Awards in 2016 for the Schitt's Creek episode "The Cabin", he was also nominated in the same category at the 5th Canadian Screen Awards in 2017 for "Happy Anniversary", and at the 6th Canadian Screen Awards in 2018 for "New Car".
