= Kelly Makin =

Canadian television and film director

- Born: Canada
- Occupations: Film director, television director

Kelly Makin is a Canadian television and film director. He directed episodes of The Kids in the Hall comedy television series and also directed several episodes of Queer as Folk including the series finale. More recently, Makin has directed episodes of Flashpoint, Less Than Kind, Death Comes to Town, and Vikings. He also directed four episodes of House Party, two episodes of Being Erica and Nurses. In 2020 and 2021, he had directed four episodes of Burden of Truth.

His film work includes Tiger Claws, National Lampoon's Senior Trip, Kids in the Hall: Brain Candy, and Mickey Blue Eyes.

Makin was bestowed a rare honor in 2009 by winning Gemini Awards for direction in two different categories: comedy series and dramatic series.

== Awards ==
- 2009, Winner, Gemini Award
  Best Direction in a Comedy Program or Series
  Less Than Kind, "The Daters"
- 2009, Winner, Gemini Award
  Best Direction in a Dramatic Series
  Flashpoint, "Planets Aligned"
- Academy of Canadian Cinema and Television
