= Russ Cochrane =

Canadian screenwriter and producer

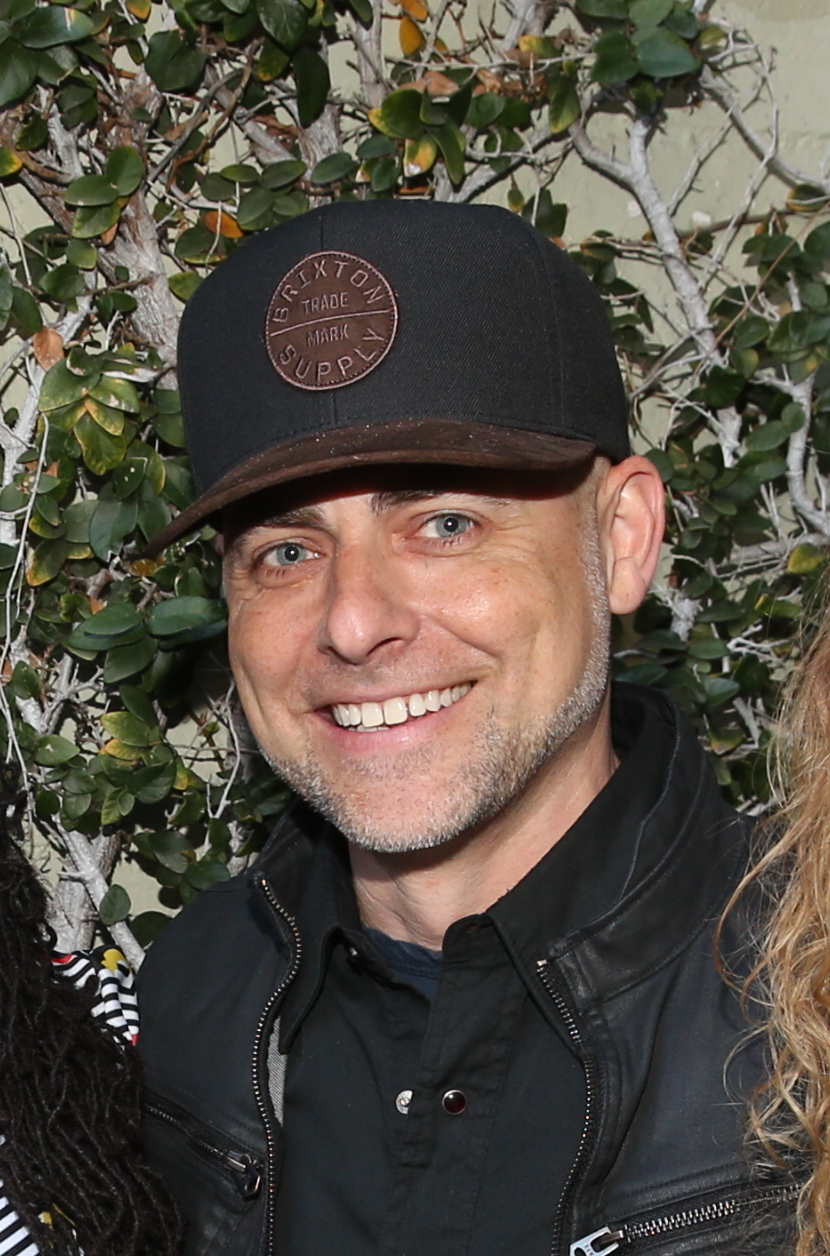

Russ Cochrane is a Canadian screenwriter and producer who has contributed to numerous television series and films. He is currently a co-executive producer and writer on the critically acclaimed BBC America television series Orphan Black, which stars the Emmy and Golden Globe nominated actress Tatiana Maslany.

He served as Executive Producer and writer on the hit Global/ABC television drama Rookie Blue, a writer and creative consultant on the hit CBS/CTV television series Flashpoint, an executive producer on the CTV/NBC supernatural drama The Listener, and co-executive producer on the CTV/The N mystery series Whistler.

Cochrane also wrote the original screenplay for the Gemini Award-winning MOW Last Exit, directed by John Fawcett. His other credits include the adventure series Young Blades; the teen comedy Radio Free Roscoe; and MTV's Undressed, produced by Roland Joffé.

Cochrane earned a degree in Philosophy and History from Dalhousie University, in Halifax, Nova Scotia. He has participated as an invited speaker at the Canadian Film Centre, and The Toronto Screenwriting Conference.
