= Lyriq Bent =

Jamaican-Canadian actor (born 1979)

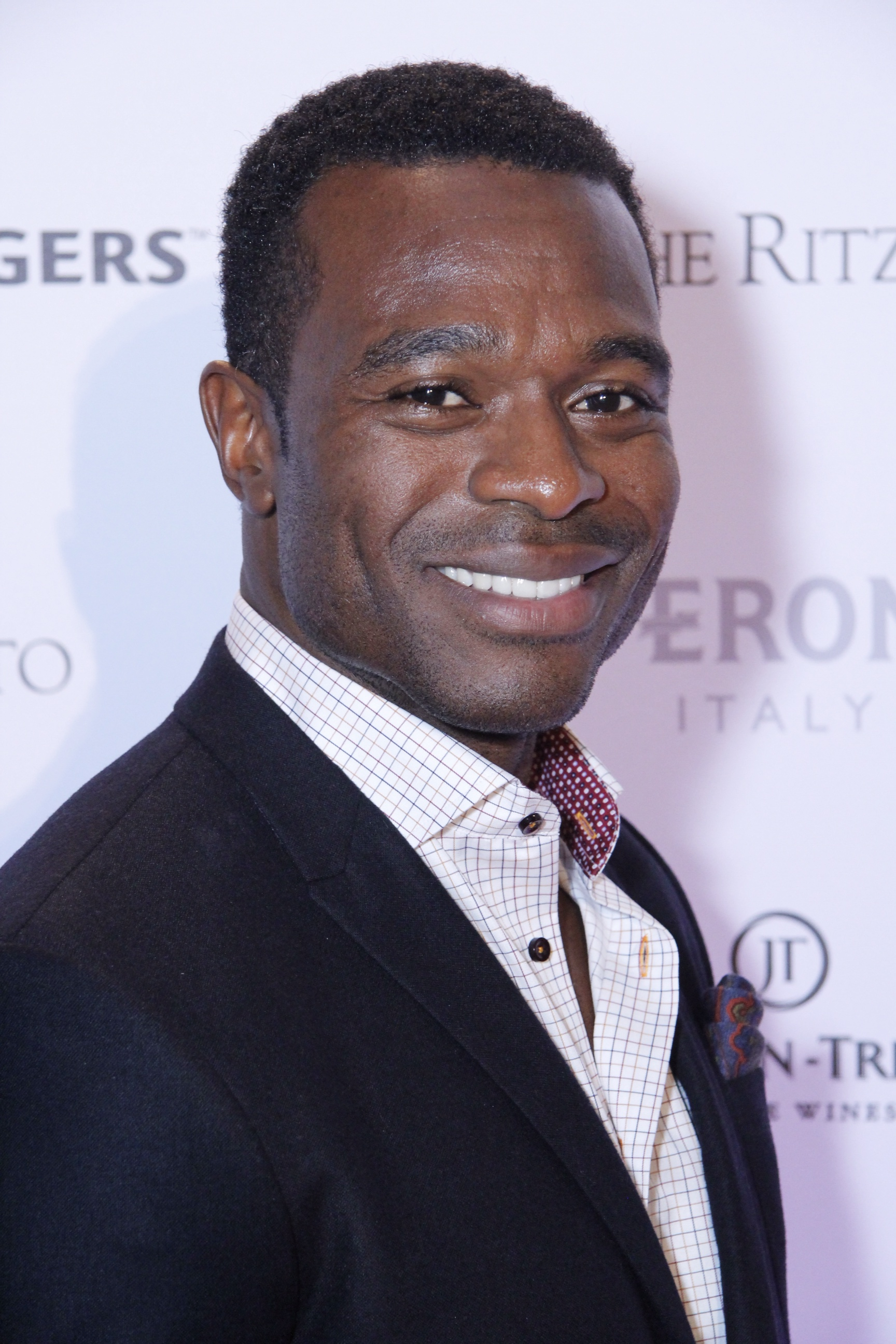
- Bent in 2014
- Born: Martin Lyriq Bent; 15 July 1979 (age 47); Kingston, Jamaica
- Citizenship: Canada
- Occupation: Actor
- Years active: 1999–present

Martin Lyriq Bent (born July 15, 1979) is a Jamaican-born Canadian actor. He is known for his roles in the Saw films, the television series Rookie Blue, and The Book of Negroes. Bent portrays Jamie Overstreet in the Netflix series She's Gotta Have It, based on the film of the same name.

== Early life ==
Martin Lyriq Bent was born in Kingston, Jamaica, and moved to Toronto, Ontario, Canada, when he was six years old.

== Career ==
Bent has starred in various lead and supporting roles both in film and television since he began his acting career in the early 2000s. Prior to landing a co-starring role in the drama series Angela's Eyes, he guest starred on the UPN series Kevin Hill opposite Taye Diggs, and USA Network's Kojak opposite Ving Rhames. After appearing on several television shows, Playback Magazine listed him as one of Canada's top rising stars.

Bent attracted further attention when he co-starred in the hit horror films Saw II and Saw III as Officer Daniel Rigg. He later starred as one of the central characters in Saw IV.

From 2010 to 2014 he co-starred in the Canadian television series Rookie Blue, portraying Staff Sergeant Frank Best.

In 2015 Bent portrayed Chekura Tiano in the television miniseries The Book of Negroes, based on the best-selling novel by Lawrence Hill. For this role, Bent won the award for Best Actor in a Television Film or Miniseries at the 2016 4th Canadian Screen Awards.

He was a Canadian Screen Award nominee for Best Lead Performance in a Web Program or Series at the 10th Canadian Screen Awards in 2022 for the web series For the Record.

== Filmography ==
=== Film ===
List of films and roles
Year	Title	Role	Notes
2001	The Caveman's Valentine	Seraph Dancer	
2002	Superbob	Lepke	
2002	Damaged Goods	Eddie Barrel	
2003	Crime Spree	Ellwood	
2003	Honey	Barber	
2005	The Life and Hard Times of Guy Terrifico	Mr. Stuff	
2005	Four Brothers	Damian	
2005	Saw II	Daniel Rigg	
2006	Take the Lead	Easy	
2006	Saw III	Daniel Rigg	
2007	Skinwalkers	Doak	
2007	Saw IV	Daniel Rigg	
2009	Defendor	Wayne	
2010	Mother's Day	Treshawn Jackson	
2010	Perception	Father	Short
2012	Home Again	Dunston Williams	
2013	Queen City	Takiri	
2015	Pay the Ghost	Jordan Reynolds	
2018	Love Jacked	Tyrell	
2018	Acrimony	Robert Gayle	
2018	Nappily Ever After	Will Wright	
2019	Benjamin	Greg	
2019	Astronaut	Jim	

=== Television ===
List of television appearances and roles
Year	Title	Role	Notes
2000	Relic Hunter	Quelch's Guard #2	Episode: "The Legend of the Lost"
2001	Tracker	Bartender	Episode: "The Plague"
2001	Jane Doe	Rawlins	Television film
2002	Street Time	Sergeant Danny Blackstone	3 episodes
2002	Pretend You Don't See Her	Detective	Television film
2002	10,000 Black Men Named George	Disgruntled Man	Television film
2003- 2005	Blue Murder	Twist Ballard; Keith Rose	Episode: "Remington Park"; Episode: "Respect"
2003	Platinum	Devon	3 episodes
2003	Playmakers	—N/a	4 episodes
2003- 2004	Mutant X	Harris/Randall Blake	Episode: "Within These Walls"; Episode: "Art of Attraction"
2004	1-800-Missing	Dante	Episode: "Pop Star"
2004- 2005	Kevin Hill	Jack Johnson	Episode: "Full Metal Jessie"; Episode:"Sacrificial Lambs"
2005	Kojak	Billy Harris	Episode: "Pilot"
2006	Angela's Eyes	Leo Jetson	Main Cast
2006	North/South	Joss Colley	Regular Cast
2007	The Dresden Files	Jake	Episode: "Bad Blood"
2008	CSI: Miami	Colin Madison	Episode: "Going Ballistic"
2008- 2009	Sophie	Andre	7 episodes
2009	Guns	Ford Saunders	2 episodes
2010	Haven	Ray McBreen	Episode: "Harmony"
2010-14	Rookie Blue	Frank Best	45 episodes
2013	Rookie Blue Webisodes	Frank Best	Episode: "In Session: Frank Best"
2014	A Day Late and a Dollar Short	Randall	Television film
2014	The Good Sister	Investigator	Television film
2014	Aaliyah: The Princess of R&B	Barry Hankerson	Television film
2015	12 Monkeys	Henri Toussaint	Episode: "Cassandra Complex"
2015	The Book of Negroes	Chekura Tiano	5 episodes
2016	Coconut Hut	Desmond Kilpatrick	Episode: "No Wifi"
2016	Shoot the Messenger	Frank Lutz	8 episodes
2016	Ladies Book Club	Carlyle	Television film
2016	Group Home	Winnie	Television film
2017	Mary Kills People	Detective Frank Gaines	6 episodes
2017- 2019	She's Gotta Have It	Jamie Overstreet	19 episodes
2018	The Man in the High Castle	Mingus Jones	Episode: "Sensô Kôi"; Episode: "Sabra"
2019	The Affair	Paul	3 episodes
2019	Carter	Joyce Boyle	8 episodes
2020	For the Record	Stefan	Episode: "Climax"
2021	Our Christmas Journey	Rick	Television film
2021	An Ice Wine Christmas	Declan Monroe	Television film
2021	Delilah	Gordon Leighton	6 episodes
2022	Long Slow Exhale	Garrett Carter	12 episodes
2022	Kid's Crew	Principal Drayton	3 episodes
2023	The Rookie: Feds	Congressman Damien Roberts	Episode: "Close Contact"
2023	Law & Order	Pastor Mike Butler	Episode: "Mammon"

=== Video games ===
List of video game voice roles
Year	Title	Role	Notes
2016	Mafia III	Emmanuel Lazare (voice)	
