= Matt Gordon =

Canadian actor (born 1969)

- Born: 1969 (age 56–57); Toronto, Ontario, Canada
- Occupation: Actor
- Years active: 1997-present

Matt Gordon (born 1969) is a Canadian actor, best known for playing Doc in the sports sitcom Rent-a-Goalie, and for his portrayal of Officer Oliver Shaw in the drama series Rookie Blue.

== Filmography ==
=== Film ===
Year	Production	Role	Notes
1999	Pushing Tin	Ken	
2000	Apartment Hunting	Mac McConnell	
2001	Say Nothing	Tony [the] Photographer	
2002	Saint Monica	TTC Attendant	
2004	Shall We Dance?	Frank	
2004	Trouser Accidents	Luis	Short film
2005	A Stranger Here Myself	Petronivich	Short film
2005	Looking for Angelina	Constable White	
2006	Full of Grace	Father Patrick	Short film
2007	Your Beautiful Cul de Sac Home	Greg Fulton	
2007	Full of It	Coach Henderson	
2008	Green Door	Bob	Short film
2008	Traitor	Simon	
2008	Grindstone Road	Martin	
2008	Blindness	Minister's Assistant	
2009	Defendor	Jerry	
2009	A Fight and a Wedding	Craig	Short film
2010	Casino Jack	Bill Jarrell	
2010	Last Minute Stan	Stan	Short film
2012	A Man's World	Phil	
2015	Room	Doug	
2019	American Woman	Bob	
2019	Goalie	Tommy Ivan	

=== Television ===
Year	Production	Role	Notes
1997	Earth: Final Conflict	Bettor	1 episode
1998	Once a Thief		1 episode
2000	Foreign Objects	Cameraman	1 episode
2001	Murder Among Friends	Acting Instructor	TV movie
2002	The Eleventh Hour	Murray Dann	10 episodes
2003	Doc	Ryan Thorpe	1 episode
2004	Kevin Hill	Russell Berlin	1 episode
2004	Evel Knievel		TV movie
2004	Wonderfalls	Conservative Patron	1 episode
2004	Mutant X	Nolan Blackledge	1 episode
2004	The Newsroom	Jim's Agent	1 episode
2005	This is Wonderland	Ed Baranyk	1 episode
2005	Mayday	Carson Evans	TV movie
2005	Terry	Bill Vigars	TV movie
2005	Tilt	Wayne Nickel	2 episodes (1 uncredited)
2005	Tripping the Wire: A Stephen Tree Mystery	Bart Burgess	TV movie
2006	Rent-a-Goalie	Doc	24 episodes
2006	Wedding Wars	Wayne	TV movie
2006	Earthstorm	Albert	TV movie
2007	The Dresden Files	Waldo Butters	5 episodes (TV miniseries)
2007	Jeff Ltd.	Darren	1 episode
2008	The Summit	Demchuk	TV miniseries
2008	Flashpoint	Frank McAndrew	2 episodes
2008	Would Be Kings		TV miniseries
2008	The Line	Kevin	2 episodes
2009	Throwing Stones	Mac Thom	TV movie
2009	The Listener	Kyle Elson	1 episode
2009	Murdoch Mysteries	Rudolph Sutton	1 episode
2010	Rookie Blue	S/Sgt. Oliver Shaw	Lead Role
2011	Republic of Doyle	Big Fat Ronnie	2 episodes
2012	Your Side of the Bed	Dan	
2012	Saving Hope	Chester Mills	1 episode
2017	Saving Hope	Liam Quinn	
2018	The Detail	Donnie Sullivan	10 episodes
2018–2019	Impulse	Thomas Hope	19 episodes
2019	Burden of Truth	Mr. Bennet	1 episode
2020	Nurses	Dr. Mike Goldwyn	2 episodes
2020	Hudson & Rex	Murray Whitmore	1 episode
2020	Frankie Drake Mysteries	John Hunter	2 episodes
2024	Law & Order Toronto: Criminal Intent	Noah Wright	1 episode
2025	Heated Rivalry	George Grady	3 episodes

== Awards ==
Year	Award	Category	Work nominated	Result
2013	Canadian Screen Award	Best Supporting Actor in a Drama Program or Series	Rookie Blue	Nominated
2009	Gemini Award	Best Ensemble Performance in a Comedy Program or Series	Rent-a-Goalie (Shared with Cast)	Nominated
2008	Gemini Award	Best Ensemble Performance in a Comedy Program or Series	Rent-a-Goalie (Shared with Cast)	Nominated
2007	Gemini Award	Best Ensemble Performance in a Comedy Program or Series	Rent-a-Goalie (Shared with Cast)	Nominated
2011	Gemini Award	Best Performance by an Actor in a Featured Supporting Role in a Dramatic Series	Rookie Blue	Nominated
2003	Gemini Award	Best Performance by an Actor in a Featured Supporting Role in a Dramatic Series	The Eleventh Hour	Nominated
