= Morwyn Brebner =

Canadian writer

- Born: Cardiff, Wales, United Kingdom
- Citizenship: Canada
- Writing career
- Language: English
- Genres: Theater, television

Morwyn Brebner is a Canadian playwright, television writer and producer, best known as creator and producer of the television series Rookie Blue and Saving Hope.

Born in Cardiff, Wales and raised in Ottawa, Ontario, Brebner is a graduate of the National Theatre School of Canada. Her first play, Music for Contortionist, premiered at Tarragon Theatre in 2000 and was a shortlisted nominee for the Dora Mavor Moore Award for Outstanding New Play. Her subsequent plays have included Liquor Guns Karate; Little Mercy's First Murder, which won six Dora Awards, including Outstanding New Musical; The Optimists, which was a shortlisted finalist for the Governor General's Award for English-language drama in 2006; Love Among the Russians; The President; and Heartbreaker. She was the English translator of Évelyne de la Chenelière's plays Strawberries in January (Des fraises en janvier), Bashir Lazhar and Public Disorder (Désordre public), and of Serge Boucher's Motel Hélène.

She remained playwright-in-residence at Tarragon until 2012.

As a television writer her credits have included episodes of The Eleventh Hour, At the Hotel, Moose TV, King, Rookie Blue, Saving Hope, Bellevue and Coroner, and she was executive producer of Rookie Blue, Saving Hope, Bellevue and Coroner.

She is married to playwright Michael Healey.
