= Enuka Okuma =

Canadian actress

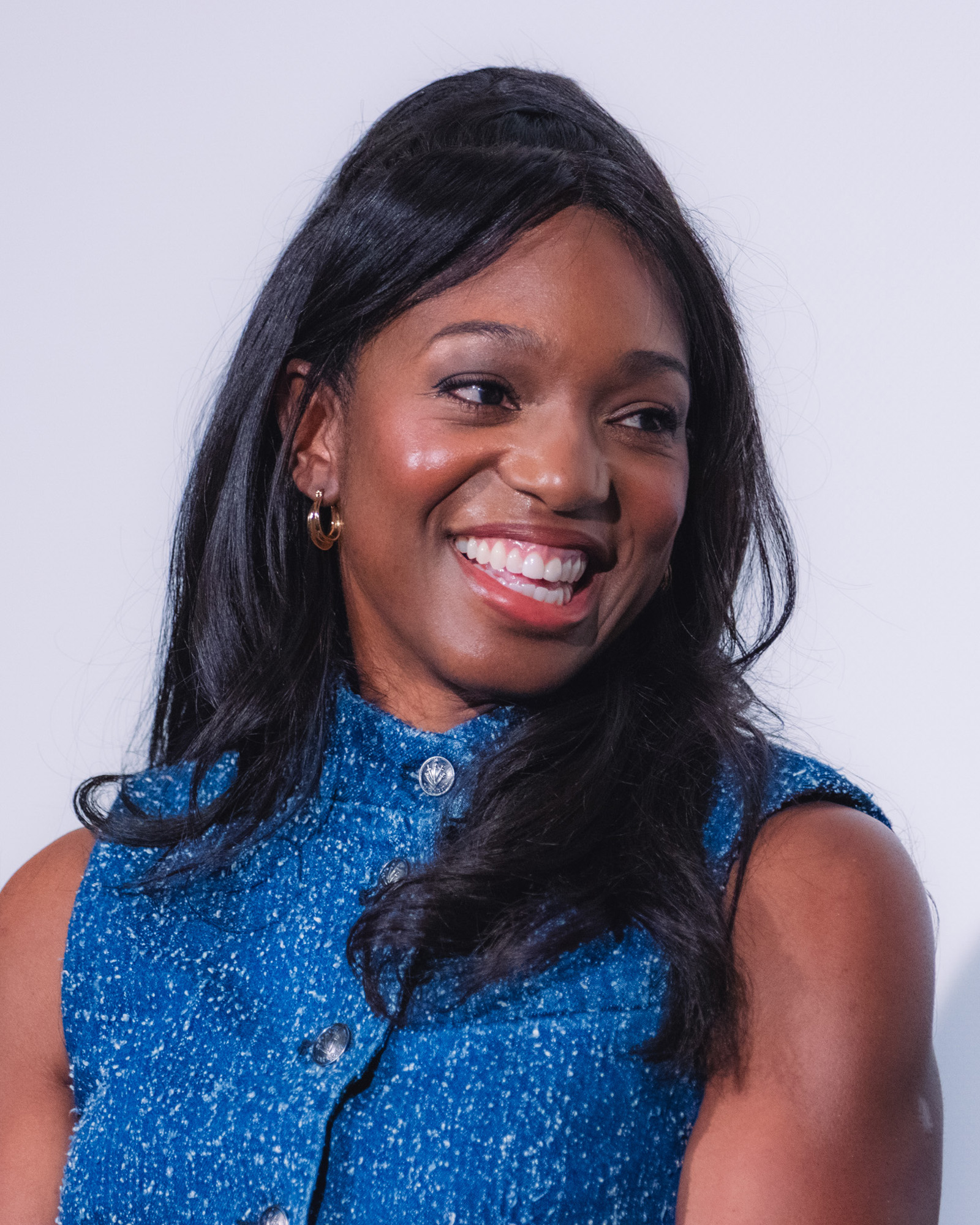
- Okuma in 2026
- Born: Enuka Vanessa Okuma; Vancouver, British Columbia, Canada
- Occupations: Actress; writer; director
- Years active: 1990–present
- Spouse: Joe Gasparik (m. 2011)
- Website: enukaokuma.com

Enuka Vanessa Okuma (/ɛˈnuːkə oʊˈkuːmə/) is a Canadian actress, writer and director, best known for her role as detective Traci Nash in the Global/ABC police drama series, Rookie Blue (2010–2015).

Okuma is also known for her work on the Canadian television series Madison (1994–1998) and Sue Thomas: F.B.Eye (2002–2005). She appeared in the first season of TV soap opera Hillside as the scheming and conspiring Kelly.

Okuma made her directorial debut with the short film Cookie, on which she was also a writer, actor, and executive producer. She has since expanded into writing for television.

== Early life ==
Okuma was born in Vancouver, British Columbia. She is of Nigerian descent, from the Igbo people, and is a graduate of Simon Fraser University's School for the Contemporary Arts.

== Career ==
=== Acting ===
==== 1990s: Early teen roles ====
In 1990, she began her career on television, appearing as a regular cast member during the first season of the Canadian teen soap opera Hillside.

Throughout the 1990s, she also played supporting roles in several made for television films and Canadian television series, such as Madison. She eventually made her feature film debut with a supporting role in Double Jeopardy (1999).

==== 2000s: Transition into adult roles ====
Okuma began to transition from teenage roles to adult roles, with appearances on a wide range of productions, especially television. Okuma co-starred in the American crime drama series Sue Thomas: F.B.Eye from 2002 to 2005. She guest starred on various hit television series, including Dark Angel, Odyssey 5, Cold Case, Grey's Anatomy and NCIS: Los Angeles. She also had the recurring role as Marika Donoso on the seventh season of the Fox series 24.

==== 2010s—2020s: Continued success ====
In 2010, Okuma began starring in the Global/ABC police drama series, Rookie Blue as detective Traci Nash. When being interviewed about how she got her role on Rookie Blue, Okuma said:

I originally auditioned for the part of Gail [played by Charlotte Sullivan] and Charlotte auditioned for Traci. When we got the parts, I said, "I think I would rather play Traci" and Charlotte said, "I think I would rather play Gail." Thankfully, the producers thought the same.

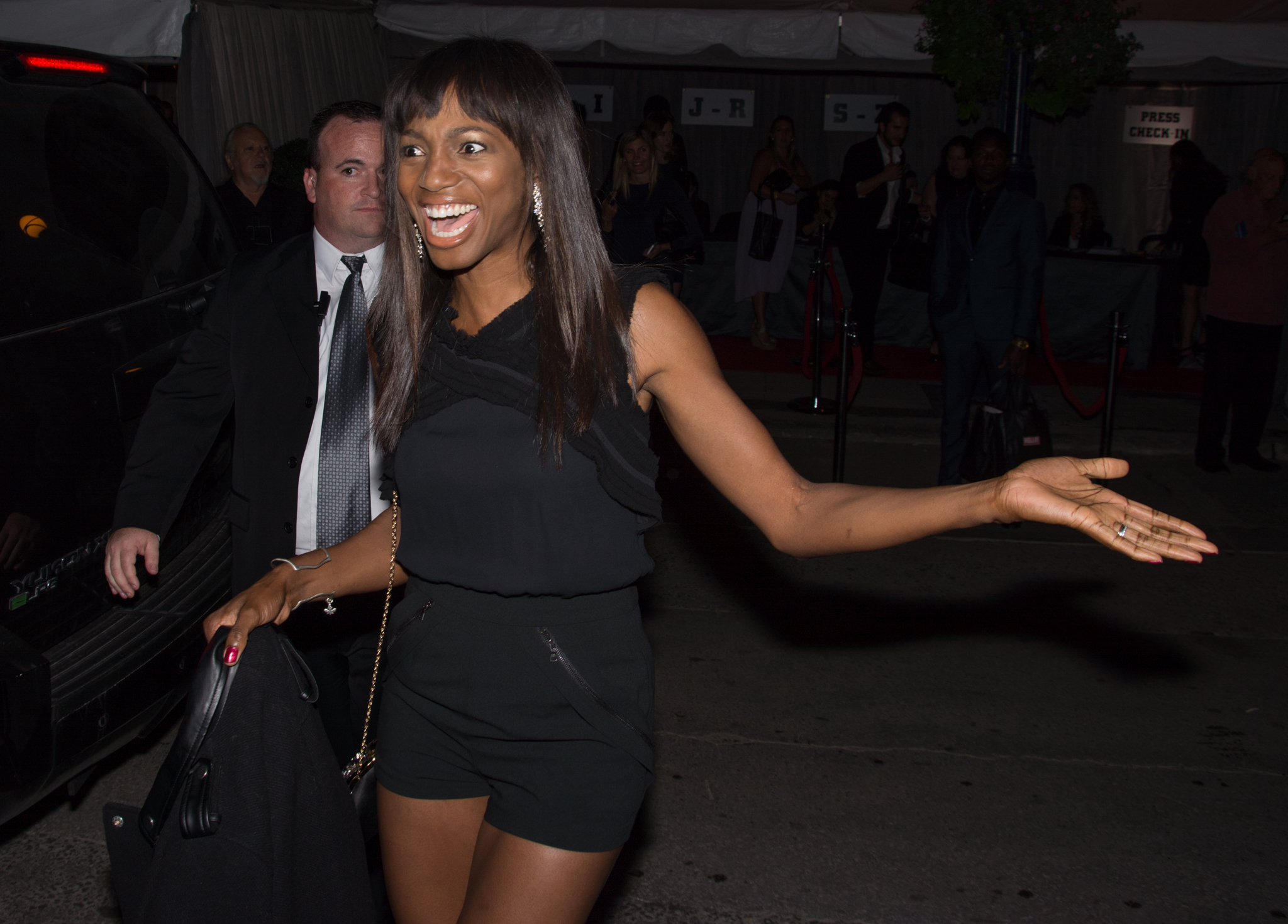
Okuma at the 2014 Toronto International Film Festival

Okuma was cast as one of lead characters in the ABC pilot, The Adversaries, in 2015. That year, she also guest starred as Nia Lahey on the hit series How to Get Away with Murder.

She joined the series Workin' Moms in 2021 as recurring character Sloane Mitchell and became a regular the following season.

Okuma was cast in the series Paradise as recurring character Terri Rogers-Collins, and became a series regular in season two.

=== Writing and directing ===
Okuma made her directorial debut with the short film, Cookie, on which she was also a writer, actor, and executive producer.

In 2015, Okuma co-wrote the Rookie Blue episode titled "Best Man".

== Awards ==
For her role in Madison, she was nominated for Best Performance in a Children's or Youth Program or Series at the 1995 Gemini Awards. The following year, also for Madison, she was nominated for Best Performance by an Actress in a Continuing Leading Dramatic Role.

Okuma won a Women In Film award at the 1999 Vancouver International Film Festival for her role in Daydrift.

For her role on Rookie Blue, Okuma was nominated for Best Performance by an Actress in a Featured Supporting Role in a Dramatic Series at the 2011 Gemini Awards, and for the Canadian Screen Award for Best Performance by an Actress in a Featured Supporting Role in a Dramatic Program or Series at the 2013 Canadian Screen Awards.

== Personal life ==
On July 2, 2011, Okuma married musician Joe Gasparik in Toronto, where they met while working on a television show together. Gasparik proposed to Okuma on a beach in Vancouver after three years of dating.

== Filmography ==
=== Film ===
Year	Title	Role	Notes
1999	G-Saviour	Cynthia Graves	Television film
1999	Double Jeopardy	Parolee	
1999	Daydrift	Lucy	
2000	Reindeer Games	Cocktail Waitress	
2001	Josie and the Pussycats	Fashion Team	
2001	Suddenly Naked	Andrea	
2001	Sea	Sarah	
2003	House of the Dead	Karma	
2009	What Colour Is Love?	Beverly Rivers	Television film
2009	Stolen	Officer Angie Riddick	
2011	Cookie	Rachel	Also writer, director, producer
2017	Battle of the Sexes	Bonny	
2019	Eleven Eleven	Aleena (voice)	NBC Universal
2020	The Sleepover	Elise	Netflix film
2020	Eat Wheaties!	Michelle	
2025	For Worse	Debbie	

=== Television ===
Year	Title	Role	Notes
1990	MacGyver	Young Club Member	Episode: "The Gun"; credited as Vanessa Okuma
1991	Hillside	Kelly	13 episodes; credited as Vanessa Okuma
1993–1997	Madison	Sheri Davis	5 episodes; credited as Enuka Vanessa Okuma and Vanessa Okuma
1998	Da Vinci's Inquest	Summer	2 episodes
1998	NightMan	Singer/Crystal	3 episodes
1998	Shadow Raiders	Jade (voice)	10 episodes
1999	The City	Kira	5 episodes
2000	Mobile Suit Gundam Wing	Lady Une (voice)	English dub
2000	These Arms of Mine	Adrian	2 episodes
2001	Gundam Wing: Endless Waltz	Lady Une (voice)	English dub
2001	Andromeda	Sofia/Isabella Ortiz	Episode: "Last Call at the Broken Hammer"
2002	Da Vinci's Inquest	Maria	2 episodes
2002–2005	Sue Thomas: F.B.Eye	Lucy Dotson	56 episodes
2006	Cold Case	Alice Stallworth in 1948	Episode: "Sandhogs"
2007	Grey's Anatomy	Teresa Brotherton	Episode: "Physical Attraction... Chemical Reaction"
2009	24	Marika Donoso	4 episodes
2010–2015	Rookie Blue	Traci Nash	74 episodes
2015	How to Get Away with Murder	Nia Lahey	2 episodes
2016	Slasher	Lisa-Ann Follows	4 episodes
2016	Masters of Sex	Cleo	Episode: "Coats or Keys"
2017–2019	Steven Universe	Rhodonite (voice)	5 episodes
2018	Caught	KC Williams	5 episodes
2018	Impulse	Deputy Anna Hulce	Main role
2019	A Million Little Things	Sandra	2 episodes
2021	Frankie Drake Mysteries	Toni Freedmon	Episode: "Sweet Justice"
2021–2023	Workin' Moms	Sloane Mitchell	Main role
2022	S.W.A.T.	DEA Agent Nadia Lyons	Episode: "Three Guns"
2024	Tracker	US Marshal Jenny Martinez	Episode: "Out of the Past"
2025	Paradise	Dr. Teri Rogers-Collins	Recurring role (season 1), main cast (season 2)
2025	The Pitt	Natalie Malone	Episode: "5:00 P.M."
2025	St. Denis Medical	Dr. Fenner	Episode: "Two Docs, One Conf"

=== Video games ===
Year	Title	Role	Notes
2024	Mortal Kombat 1	Cyrax (voice)	"Khaos Reigns" DLC
2025	Mecha Break	Female Protagonist Voice 6 (voice)	English version
