= Rookie Blue =

Canadian police drama television series (2010–2015)

- Genre: Police procedural
- Created by: Tassie Cameron; Morwyn Brebner; Ellen Vanstone
- Starring: Missy Peregrym; Gregory Smith; Enuka Okuma; Travis Milne; Charlotte Sullivan; Peter Mooney; Rachael Ancheril; Lyriq Bent; Melanie Nicholls-King; Priscilla Faia; Matt Gordon; Noam Jenkins; Eric Johnson; Adam MacDonald; Ben Bass
- Composer: Ron Sures
- Country of origin: Canada
- Original language: English
- No. of seasons: 6
- No. of episodes: 74 (list of episodes)

Production
- Executive producers: David Wellington; John Morayniss; Noreen Halpern; Ilana Frank; Tassie Cameron
- Production locations: Toronto, Ontario, Canada
- Cinematography: David Perrault
- Editor: Paul Day
- Camera setup: Single-camera setup
- Running time: 44 minutes
- Production companies: Shaw Media; Thump, Inc.; Canwest; Ilana C. Frank Films; Entertainment One

Original release
- Network: Global (Canada); ABC (United States)
- Release: June 24, 2010 – July 29, 2015

Rookie Blue is a Canadian police procedural television series starring Missy Peregrym and Gregory Smith. It was created by Morwyn Brebner, Tassie Cameron, and Ellen Vanstone. The series premiered on June 24, 2010, and aired on Global in Canada and ABC in the United States.

On July 17, 2013, Global and ABC jointly announced that Rookie Blue was renewed for a fifth season. Originally intended to be a single season consisting of 22 episodes (up from the usual 13), the season was split in two. Season 5 premiered on May 19, 2014, on Global, on June 19 on ABC, and on July 20 on Universal Channel in the UK. The second 11 episodes aired in 2015 and were later re-branded as season 6. The final episode of Season 6 aired that July.

On October 16, 2015, it was announced that Rookie Blue had completed its run after six seasons and would not be returning.

== Premise ==
There's something really primal about the idea of being a rookie—it hits that horrible, eternal sense of feeling like a fraud, like a kid dressed in grown-up clothes, trying to pretend you know what you're doing. And I thought, what if you were feeling just like that—but with a gun?

—Tassie Cameron, Executive Producer

Set in Toronto, the series follows the lives of five rookie police officers from fictional 15 Division who have just graduated from the academy. The officers must learn to deal with not only their duties as police officers, but also the problems and expectations of family, friends, and romantic attachments at the office. They are first responders who are about to learn that no amount of training prepares you for life.

"To serve, protect, and..." is usually used in the parade room before shift starts by the officer leading the parade. It always has a significant meaning in the context of the episode plot. More often than not, however, they use "to serve, protect, and don't screw up".

Rookie Blue has been described as the Grey's Anatomy of the world of rookie cops.

== Setting ==
The series is set in Toronto, often referencing local street names and areas. The streets are often recognizable, as is the case with Jameson Avenue in Parkdale, the location of a call-out in the pilot episode.

== Episodes ==
Season	Episodes	Originally released	
Season	Episodes	First released	Last released
1	13	June 24, 2010	September 9, 2010
2	13	June 23, 2011	September 8, 2011
3	13	May 24, 2012	September 6, 2012
4	13	May 23, 2013	September 12, 2013
5	11	May 19, 2014	August 6, 2014
6	11	May 21, 2015	July 29, 2015

== Cast ==
=== Main ===
Actor	Character	Position	Seasons					
Actor	Character	Position	1	2	3	4	5	6
Missy Peregrym	Andrea "Andy" McNally	Training Officer	Main	Main	Main	Main	Main	Main
Travis Milne	Christian "Chris" Diaz	Training Officer	Main	Main	Main	Main	Main	Main
Charlotte Sullivan	Gail Peck	Training Officer	Main	Main	Main	Main	Main	Main
Priscilla Faia	Chloe Price	Training Officer				Main	Main	Main
Peter Mooney	Nick Collins	Officer			Main	Main	Main	Main
Enuka Okuma	Traci Nash	Detective Sergeant	Main	Main	Main	Main	Main	Main
Gregory Smith	Dov Epstein	Detective	Main	Main	Main	Main	Main	Main
Ben Bass	Sam Swarek	Detective	Main	Main	Main	Main	Main	Main
Adam MacDonald	Stephen "Steve" Peck	Detective	Recurring			Recurring	Main	Recurring
Rachael Ancheril	Marlo Cruz	Detective				Main	Recurring	Recurring
Eric Johnson	Lucas "Luke" Callaghan	Detective	Main	Main	Recurring	Recurring		
Noam Jenkins	Jerry Barber	Detective	Main	Main	Main			
Melanie Nicholls-King	Noelle Williams	Detective	Recurring	Main	Main	Recurring		Recurring
Lyriq Bent	Frank Best	Staff Sergeant	Main	Main	Main	Main	Guest	
Matt Gordon	Oliver Shaw	Staff Sergeant	Main	Main	Main	Main	Main	Main

==== Officers ====
- Missy Peregrym portrays Andrea "Andy" Grace McNally. She is driven by the desire to do the right thing even if it means not following procedure. Andy is the most positive person on the job—because she knows first-hand where the job can take you, and she does not want to go there.
- Charlotte Sullivan portrays Gail Peck. Underneath her caustic exterior, Gail is vulnerable and feels lonely. Because she is the daughter of high-ranking officials in the police force she is often seen by others as getting preferential treatment.
- Travis Milne portrays Chris Diaz. He is often seen as taking the "by the book" approach. He believes in the chain of command, following orders, doing the right thing and above all, he believes in defending the weak. Despite this seemingly good trait, it makes him unable to take initiative.
- Peter Mooney portrays Nick Collins. He appears for first time in season 3. He is a former soldier who served for four years, including a tour in Afghanistan, before becoming a cop.
- Priscilla Faia portrays Chloe Price. She appears for the first time in season 4, when she is first introduced as a one-night stand of Dov's and later revealed to be Frank's goddaughter and the newest rookie to be transferred to 15 Division. She is talkative and bubbly, which sometimes annoys the other rookies. However, she shows herself to be a competent officer.

==== Detectives ====
- Gregory Smith portrays Dov Epstein. He is often shown to be overeager to get involved in everything even when it is not necessary for him to do so. This characteristic has gotten him into trouble many times, so much so he has been told to "slow it down".
- Ben Bass portrays Samuel "Sam" Jay Swarek. He is known for following his instincts rather than following the book and is thus labeled as a rogue cop by his frustrated superiors.
- Adam MacDonald portrays Steve Peck. Steve is Gail's older brother and a corrupt detective in the Guns and Gangs division.
- Noam Jenkins portrays Jerry Barber. A divorced detective at 15 Division, he actively participated in operations and stings, coordinating officers and other resources at his disposal.
- Eric Johnson portrays Luke Callaghan. A homicide detective at 15 Division, he is tireless and exceedingly charming.
- Melanie Nicholls-King portrays Noelle Williams. Was originally a training officer and is veteran of the police force. Noelle is not only great at her job, but she is also an invaluable mentor for the rookies in her division.
- Rachael Ancheril portrays Marlo Cruz. During the six months in which Andy and Nick are away, Sam moves on and enters into a relationship with her. She is well liked by everyone, but she and Andy end up in situations together as partners.

==== Sergeants ====
- Enuka Okuma portrays Traci Nash. She is a single mother trying to find the balance between her work and her family.
- Matt Gordon portrays Oliver Shaw, one of the rookies' training officers and a veteran of the police force. He is the kind of cop who doesn't go looking for trouble but doesn't shy away from it when it finds him. He is one of the few older police officers with a functional marriage and family, having a wife and three daughters.
- Lyriq Bent portrays Frank Best. Frank was a training officer until he was promoted to Staff Sergeant after Boyko was promoted.

=== Supporting ===
- Peter MacNeill portrays Tommy McNally. He is Andy's father. Formerly a homicide detective, he has a drinking problem.
- Barbara Williams portrays Claire McNally. She is Andy's mother. She works in social services.
- Aaron Abrams portrays Donovan Boyd. He is a guns and gangs detective who seems to be always over the edge.
- Camille Sullivan portrays Jo Rosati. She is a homicide detective.
- Mayko Nguyen portrays Sue Tran. She is a bomb technician for ETF.
- Aliyah O'Brien portrays Holly Stewart. Appears for the first time in Season 4 Episode 7. She is a forensic pathologist who soon becomes one of Gail's closest friends.
- Jim Codrington portrays ETF Sgt Bailey. He is seen throughout seasons 3–5 with his team helping the officers of 15 Division.
- Emily Hampshire portrays Celery. Celery is dating Oliver.

== Production and development ==
The series is produced by E1 Entertainment, Canwest, and Thump, Inc. The pilot script was written by Ilana Frank. In February 2009, Canwest ordered the show straight-to-series with a 13 episode order under the working title Copper. ABC purchased the American broadcast rights to the series in April 2009.

The first role cast was Andy McNally, portrayed by Missy Peregrym, followed by Gregory Smith cast as Dov Epstein. Additional casting was announced in early July. Production began in Toronto, Ontario, on July 14, 2009, and was expected to continue through November 2009. Thirteen episodes were produced.

On June 21, 2010 The Accessible Channel announced that Rookie Blue would be the first series to premiere with a simultaneous Described Video broadcast for people with vision impairments.

Filming of the second season took place between September 1, 2010, and January 25, 2011. Tassie Cameron served as head writer and series showrunner, with Georgia Toews serving as writing assistant. Filming of the third season took place between August 25, 2011, and January 23, 2012. Filming of the fourth season took place between August 20, 2012, and January 25, 2013. Filming of the combined fifth and sixth seasons took place between January 20, 2014, and October 1, 2014.

On September 3, 2015, during an interview with Missy Peregrym in The Hollywood Reporter, it was reported that the season six finale would likely be the Rookie Blue series finale, since the series regulars have not been called back for another season.

== Release ==
=== Broadcast ===
Rookie Blue is distributed by E1 Entertainment. NBC Universal Global Networks (also known as Universal Networks International) purchased broadcast rights in all markets except Canada (country of origin), France, Germany, and the United States. Ion Television acquired the off network rights to the series in the United States. Ion ran the show starting in December 2014 on Friday nights at 10:00 p.m. with five episodes in a row, however by mid-February 2015 the show had been pulled from Ion's schedule due to low ratings, and replaced first by Blue Bloods, then Cold Case.

=== Home media ===
Entertainment One releases the show on DVD and a few season on Blu-ray in Region 1. The Canadian releases contain an additional French audio track and the Canadian Blu-ray release is three discs instead of four. In Australia (Region 4), only the first two seasons were released. However, Via Vision Entertainment has acquired the rights to the series and will released the complete series boxset on November 18, 2020.

DVD name	Region 1	Region 2	Region 4	Ep #	Discs
Rookie Blue: The Complete First Season	May 31, 2011	October 10, 2011	April 4, 2012	13	4
Rookie Blue: The Complete Second Season	May 29, 2012	October 8, 2012	July 18, 2012	13	4
Rookie Blue: The Complete Third Season	May 7, 2013	August 12, 2013	May 7, 2013	13	4
Rookie Blue: The Complete Fourth Season	May 6, 2014	September 1, 2014	—N/a	13	4
Rookie Blue: Season 5	August 18, 2015	—N/a	—N/a	11	3
Rookie Blue: Season 6	March 8, 2016	—N/a	—N/a	11	3
The Complete Series	March 8, 2016 (Canada); September 20, 2016 (US)	—N/a	November 18, 2020	74	22

== Reception ==
=== Critical response ===
Metacritic summarizes the response as "mixed or average reviews". One of the more favorable reviews came from Alessandra Stanley of The New York Times, saying "it's not a groundbreaking police drama, nor is it divertingly cheesy. It's well made and well meaning." Robert Lloyd from the Los Angeles Times was also favorable with the show, and agreed with Stanley describing it as nothing new to television, but he rather enjoyed it and saying "Rookie Blue doesn't oversell itself. It is modest and plain in a way that makes even its less likely moments feel credible enough." Rob Salem of the Toronto Star favorably compared the series to Grey's Anatomy. "Call it Blues Anatomy (or Gray's Academy, take your pick)." Salem found the show "slickly produced and engagingly acted" and had a particular fondness for Missy Peregrym's character, which he described as "the Meredith surrogate". The Globe and Mail's television critic, John Doyle, described Rookie Blue as "a good cop show with a terrible title." Doyle went on to say "it's a very slick, glossy melodrama, all handsome actors and admirably sharp storylines. Yet it's true to its Toronto roots."

Among the more negative reviewers was Rob Owen of the Pittsburgh Post-Gazette. Owen calls the show "Grey's Anatomy in a police station." He did however hope to see some interaction between religion and police through one of the characters but stated "Given the generally bland nature of Rookie Blue, that's probably too much to ask." Paige Wiser from the Chicago Sun-Times describes the show as overly generic and claims that the rookies look more like puppies than police officers. She said "if you're looking for a new cop drama to serve and protect your entertainment interests, leave the rookies alone to ripen, and go for a ride-along with Jason Lee's Dwight." Randee Dawn from The Hollywood Reporter was much harsher, calling the writing lazy and describing the motivation of the rookies as selfish, saying that they are there to make themselves feel good and not to protect the city. Dawn said "at its core, Rookie is a terrible show." Alex Strachan of Montreal's The Gazette was unimpressed, stating that "The acting is uneven, the writing and directing aren't particularly stylish or inspired, and you've seen it countless times before." Strachan went on to say that Rookie Blue is "a harmless enough diversion on an otherwise lazy summer TV night."

=== Ratings ===
The Canadian premiere drew an audience of 1.9 million viewers with 712,000 in the 18–49 category, placing first for the night and second for the week. It is the highest rated premiere for a Canwest-commissioned drama series within the previous five years.

In the United States, the premiere drew 7.253 million viewers and an audience share in the 18–49 category of 2.0 out of 6. Furthermore, it improved upon the programming a year beforehand (20/20 special) by having +1.6 million viewers and +18% in the 18–49 age group. The premiere became the most successful scripted summer debut in over a year and in nearly six years for ABC.

Season	Canadian Timeslot (ET/PT)	Original airing			Average viewers (millions)	
Season	Canadian Timeslot (ET/PT)	Season premiere	Season finale	Television season	Canada	U.S.
1	Monday 9:00 p.m.	June 24, 2010	September 9, 2010	2010	1.597	6.125
2	Tuesday 10:00 p.m.	June 23, 2011	September 8, 2011	2011	1.351	4.995
3	Wednesday 10:00 p.m.	May 24, 2012	September 6, 2012	2012	1.202	4.945
4	Thursday 10:00 p.m.	May 23, 2013	September 12, 2013	2013	1.203	5.075
5	Monday 10:00 p.m. (Episodes 1–6); Wednesday 10:00 p.m. (Episodes 7–9); Wednesday 9:00 p.m. (Episodes 10–11)	May 19, 2014	August 6, 2014	2014		
6	Thursday 9:00 p.m. (Episodes 1–5); Wednesday 9:00 p.m. (Episodes 6–9); Wednesday 10:00 p.m. (Episodes 10–11)	May 21, 2015	July 29, 2015	2015		

=== Awards and nominations ===
Awards and nominations for Rookie Blue
Year	Presenter	Award	Work	Result	Notes
2011	Gemini Awards	Best Writing in a Dramatic Series	Big Nickel	Nominated	
2011	Gemini Awards	Best Supporting Actor, Dramatic Series	Matt Gordon	Nominated	
2011	Gemini Awards	Best Supporting Actor, Dramatic Series	Noam Jenkins	Nominated	
2011	Gemini Awards	Best Supporting Actress, Dramatic Series	Melanie Nicholls-King	Nominated	
2011	Gemini Awards	Best Supporting Actress, Dramatic Series	Enuka Okuma	Nominated	
2011	Gemini Awards	Best Actress in a Guest Role, Dramatic Series	Michelle Nolden	Nominated	
2011	Young Artist Awards	Best Performance in a TV Series – Recurring Young Actor Ten and Under	Drew Davis	Nominated	
2011	Young Artist Awards	Best Performance in a TV Series – Guest Starring Young Actor Ten and Under	Jacob Ewaniuk	Nominated	
2012	PRISM Awards	Performance in a Drama Episode	Missy Peregrym	Nominated	
2012	PRISM Awards	Drama Series Episode	Bad Moon Rising	Nominated	
2013	Canadian Screen Awards	Best Supporting Actress – Drama	Enuka Okuma	Nominated	
2014	Canadian Screen Awards	Best Actor – Drama	Ben Bass	Nominated	
2014	Canadian Screen Awards	Best Supporting Actor – Drama	Matt Gordon	Nominated	
2014	Canadian Screen Awards	Best Supporting Actress – Drama	Priscilla Faia	Nominated	
2015	Canadian Screen Awards	Golden Screen Award: TV Drama/Comedy	Rookie Blue	Won	
2016	Canadian Screen Awards	Best Actor – Drama	Ben Bass	Nominated	
2016	Canadian Screen Awards	Best Actress – Drama	Missy Peregrym	Nominated	
