= Tassie Cameron =

Canadian screenwriter

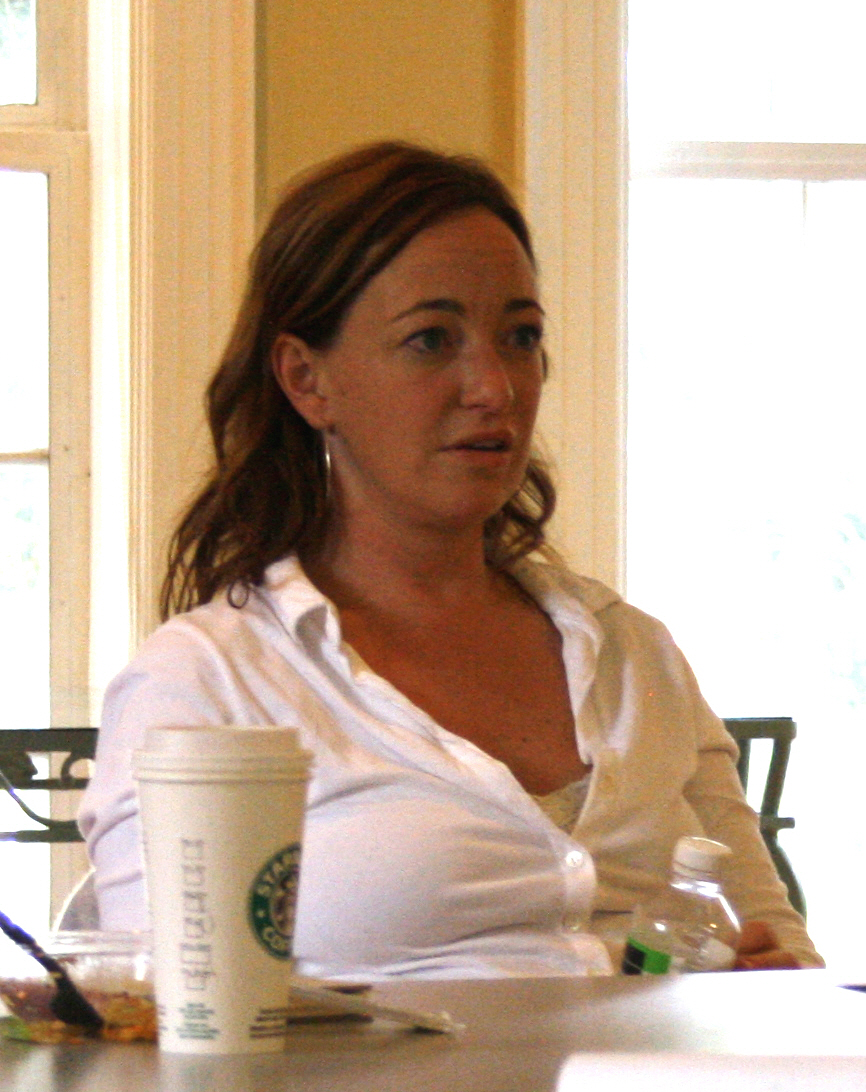
- Tassie Cameron in October 2008
- Born: Canada
- Spouse: Michael Mabbott
- Writing career
- Language: English
- Genres: Television, screenwriting

Tassie Cameron is a Canadian screenwriter who has contributed to numerous television shows and films. She was the head writer and executive producer on the Global/ABC series Rookie Blue and creator of CBC and IMDb TV's Pretty Hard Cases.

== Early life and education ==
Tassie Cameron is the daughter of journalist Stevie Cameron. She spent her formative years at Elmwood School an all-girls school in Rockcliffe Park, Ottawa.

Cameron has a Bachelor's degree in English from the University of Trinity College of the University of Toronto, Master's degree in film from New York University, and is a graduate of the Canadian Film Centre in Toronto.

== Career ==
Cameron was a story editor and writer on the CTV/Much/MTV Canada and The N/TeenNick teen drama series Degrassi: The Next Generation; an executive story editor and writer for two seasons of CTV's prime-time drama The Eleventh Hour (for which she co-won the Gemini Award for Best Writing with Semi Chellas); and a writer and story editor on CBC and Sony Pictures TV's Tom Stone television series. In 2007, she adapted Margaret Atwood's The Robber Bride into a television movie. Cameron also co-wrote with Esta Spalding the acclaimed CTV mini-series Would Be Kings, garnering them a Gemini nomination. She spent eight years in New York City working in independent film and at HBO television and has also worked as a screenwriting instructor at the Humber School for Writers.

She has been in a long-term relationship with filmmaker Michael Mabbott, with whom she collaborated on the television pilot Adele's Hotel.
