= Allegiance (Canadian TV series) =

Canadian television drama

- Genre: Police procedural
- Created by: Anar Ali
- Starring: Supinder Wraich; Stephen Lobo; Enrico Colantoni; Adolyn H. Dar; Samer Salem
- Composers: Caleb Chan; Brian Chan
- Country of origin: Canada
- No. of seasons: 3
- No. of episodes: 30

Production
- Executive producers: Anar Ali; Tex Antonucci; Mark Ellis; Erin Haskett; Nicole Mendes; Stephanie Morgenstern; David Valleau; Nimisha Mukerji; David Frazee
- Production locations: Surrey, British Columbia
- Running time: 44 minutes
- Production companies: Lark Productions; Universal International Studios

Original release
- Network: CBC
- Release: February 7, 2024 – present

Allegiance is a Canadian drama television series that premiered on CBC Television on February 7, 2024. The series has been renewed for a fourth season.

== Premise ==
Allegiance is about a rookie police officer, Sabrina Sohal, who works to exonerate her politician father after he is unexpectedly arrested for treason. As she navigates this personal and professional crisis, the police procedural explores themes of racism, class, privilege, and the complexities of the Canadian justice system.

== Cast and characters ==
=== Main ===
- Supinder Wraich as Sabrina Sohal, a Rookie Constable in Surrey, British Columbia
- Stephen Lobo as Ajeet Sohal, the Canadian Minister of Public Safety and Sabrina's politician father who she is fighting to exonerate after he is accused of treason
- Enrico Colantoni as Vincent Brambilla, Sabrina's supervising / Training Corporal
- Adolyn H. Dar as Ishaan Sohal, Sabrina's brother, former cybersecurity expert and fighting to exonerate his father.
- Samer Salem as Det. Zak Kalaini, Sabrina's new partner in Season 2.

=== Supporting ===
- Andres Joseph as Nate Brugmann, an Assistant Crown Attorney, Sabrina's romantic interest
- Toby Levins as Douglas Gabinski, a supervising / Training Sergeant
- Melanie Papalia as Gillian Grove, a Rookie Constable, tech expert and Sabrina's friend
- Lachlan Quarmby as Luke Tucker, a Rookie Constable
- David Cubitt as Eli Bolton, a Superintendent
- Vincent Gale as Oliver Campbell, an Assistant Commissioner
- Crystal Balint as Kara Degas, a Serious Crimes Inspector
- Brian Markinson as Max Portman, a lawyer
- Jake Foy as Kyle

== Episodes ==
=== Series overview ===
Season	Episodes	Originally released	
Season	Episodes	First released	Last released
1	10	February 7, 2024	April 10, 2024
2	10	January 15, 2025	March 19, 2025
3	10	January 7, 2026	April 8, 2026

=== Season 1 (2024) ===
No. overall	No. in season	Title	Directed by	Written by	Original release date
1	1	"Pilot"	David Frazee	Anar Ali	February 7, 2024
2	2	"Supply Side"	David Frazee	Aubrey Nealon	February 14, 2024
3	3	"Running on Empty"	Shannon Kohli	Seneca Aaron	February 21, 2024
4	4	"IRL"	Shannon Kohli	Mark Ellis & Stephanie Morgenstern	February 28, 2024
5	5	"Homecoming Kings"	Nimisha Mukerji	Abdul Malik	March 6, 2024
6	6	"Safe Harbours"	Nimisha Mukerji	Anar Ali & Sarah Dodd	March 13, 2024
7	7	"The Legacy"	Madison Thomas	Penny Gummerson	March 20, 2024
8	8	"8 x 6"	Madison Thomas	Mark Ellis & Stephanie Morgenstern	March 27, 2024
9	9	"Fallen Idols"	Agam Darshi	Manny Mahal & Sarah Dodd	April 3, 2024
10	10	"Dawn to Dawn"	David Frazee	Story by : Anar Ali; Teleplay by : Mark Ellis & Stephanie Morgenstern	April 10, 2024

=== Season 2 (2025) ===
No. overall	No. in season	Title	Directed by	Written by	Original release date
11	1	"Unsee This"	David Frazee	Mark Ellis & Stephanie Morgenstern	January 15, 2025
12	2	"Mad About You"	David Frazee	Shannon Masters	January 22, 2025
13	3	"The House Always Wins"	Nimisha Mukerji	Adam Pettle	January 29, 2025
14	4	"Daddy Issues"	Nimisha Mukerji	JP Larocque	February 5, 2025
15	5	"The Vow"	Sharon Lewis	Adam Pettle & Tanvi Bhatia	February 12, 2025
16	6	"Shine a Light"	Sharon Lewis	Anusree Roy	February 19, 2025
17	7	"Shelter from the Storm"	Madison Thomas	Penny E. Gummerson	February 26, 2025
18	8	"We Were Winning"	Madison Thomas	Manny Mahal	March 5, 2025
19	9	"Do No Harm"	Tarique Qayumi	Sarah Dodd	March 12, 2025
20	10	"Mercy's End"	David Frazee	Mark Ellis & Stephanie Morgenstern	March 19, 2025

=== Season 3 (2026) ===
No. overall	No. in season	Title	Directed by	Written by	Original release date
21	1	"Borderline Blue"	David Frazee	Mark Ellis & Stephanie Morgenstern	January 7, 2026
22	2	"Blood & Berries"	David Frazee	Manny Mahal	January 14, 2026
23	3	"The Mission"	Nimisha Mukerji	JP Larocque	January 21, 2026
24	4	"Blue Monday"	Nimisha Mukerji	Tanvi Bhatia	January 28, 2026
25	5	"Nakhra"	Siobhan Devine	Anusree Roy	February 25, 2026
26	6	"Drive"	Siobhan Devine	Ley Lukins	March 4, 2026
27	7	"Stolen Life"	Madison Thomas	Penny E. Gummerson	March 18, 2026
28	8	"Runaway Train"	Madison Thomas	Damon Vignale	March 25, 2026
29	9	"One of Our Own"	Troy A. Scott	Ley Lukins & Shakil Jessa	April 1, 2026
30	10	"Remember Me"	Andy Mikita	Penny Gummerson, Shakil Jessa & Manny Mahal	April 8, 2026
