= Rideau =

Rideau (French for "curtain") may refer to:

== In or near Ottawa, Ontario, Canada ==
=== Geographical features ===
- Rideau Canal
- Rideau Falls
- Rideau River
- Rideau Trail

=== Towns and places ===
- Rideau Ferry, Ontario
- Rideau Lakes, Ontario
- Rideau Street
- Rideau Township, Ontario
- Rideau View

=== Buildings and structures ===
- Rideau Centre
- Rideau Hall
- Rideau High School
- Rideau Valley

=== Clubs and organizations ===
- Rideau Canoe Club
- Rideau Club
- Rideau Curling Club

== People with the surname ==
- Brandon Rideau (born 1982), American football player
- Iris Rideau (born c. 1937), American French Creole winemaker
- Laquincy Rideau (born 1996), American basketball player
- Stéphane Rideau (born 1976), French actor
- Wilbert Rideau (born 1942), American convicted killer
- Rideau brothers, American criminals

== Other uses ==
- Rideau (company), a Canada-based company providing recognition programs and products
- Rideau Arcott, a Canadian breed of domestic sheep
- Rideau, Cruchon et Compotier, a painting c. 1893 by Paul Cézanne
- Rideau Park (Edmonton), a neighbourhood in Alberta, Canada
- Rideau Park, a community in Roxboro, Calgary, Canada
- The Curtain (essay), by Milan Kundera, published 2005 as Le Rideau
- Curtains (1995 film), a 1995 Canadian short film, in English and French, also known as Rideau

== See also ==
- Curtain (disambiguation)
