= List of Flashpoint episodes =

Flashpoint is a Canadian drama television series that originally aired on CTV in Canada and CBS in the United States before changing networks part way through the fourth season to ION Television. Flashpoint follows the lives of several officers working for an elite police tactical unit known as the Strategic Response Unit, which is called in by regular police to resolve situations beyond their control.

The series debuted on July 11, 2008, and its final episode aired December 13, 2012. Episodes are listed by their official seasons per CTV episode lists and Canadian DVD releases, and include the original air dates in North America. In a few instances, Flashpoint episodes have been broadcast out of their production order by CTV, CBS, and ION. During the course of the series, 75 episodes of Flashpoint aired over five seasons.

== Broadcast history ==
By the end of December 2008, only nine of the 13 episodes produced during the series' first season had been aired in North America, although all 13 episodes had been aired by New Zealand's TVNZ (TV2) as of December 10, 2008. In North America, the four remaining episodes of Season 1 were aired in January and February 2009; in North America, CBS and CTV initially billed these episodes as part of Season 2, rather than as part of their intended season, Season 1, as was done in international markets.

Eighteen new 2009 episodes were ordered by CTV and CBS—the original 13 ordered by CTV on August 25, 2008, plus five additional episodes that were ordered on November 19, 2008. The first nine of these new episodes, combined with the four holdover episodes from 2008 were aired as Season 2 in North America. The remaining nine episodes, although originally filmed for Season 2, were aired as "Season 3" beginning September 25, 2009, in Canada on CTV; however, CTV later corrected their online episode guide to report the seasons as produced rather than initially aired. The correction also holds for the DVD releases of "Season 2, Volume 1" and "Season 2, Volume 2". The last nine episodes of Season 2 began airing on June 4, 2010, in the United States on CBS and were shown in a different order from their original broadcast on CTV. CBS, however, erroneously refers to these episodes as "Season 3". A 13-episode third season was produced in Toronto from January to May 2010 and began airing in July 2010 on both CTV and CBS.

The fourth season of Flashpoint premiered July 8, 2011, on CTV. The fifth season of Flashpoint, which would bring it to 75 episodes, was announced by Bell Media on June 1, 2011.

Season 5 began filming in 2012. It was announced in May 2012 that the series would be ending at the end of its fifth season.

== Series overview ==
Season	Episodes	Originally released	
Season	Episodes	First released	Last released
1	13	July 11, 2008	February 13, 2009
2	18	February 27, 2009	November 20, 2009
3	13	July 16, 2010	February 6, 2011
4	18	July 8, 2011	December 13, 2011
5	13	September 20, 2012	December 13, 2012

== Episodes ==
=== Season 1 (2008–09) ===
No. overall	No. in season	Title	Directed by	Written by	Original release date	Prod. code	Canada viewers (millions)
1	1	"Scorpio"	David Frazee	Stephanie Morgenstern & Mark Ellis	July 11, 2008	101	1.11
Team One is called in to the scene of a man holding a woman hostage at a local plaza, just as its members are going to go to a retirement party. The case becomes complicated when it turns out that the man is a Croatian immigrant who doesn't speak English. The SRU Team One boss and lead negotiator, Sergeant Gregory Parker, tries to reason with the man by improvising and having a Croatian translator communicate via radio, but the man doesn't comply.
2	2	"First in Line"	David Frazee	Stephanie Morgenstern & Mark Ellis	July 18, 2008	102	0.908
A dying girl desperately needs a heart transplant. When her father receives a notification alert that a donor heart is available, only to discover that the heart is given to someone else because of a technical error, the father takes the hospital wing hostage, and starts demanding that his daughter receives the heart transplant from the doctors and will all be released when she has the surgery performed. Sergeant Parker must confront his own feelings to talk the man down before the heart is irreparably damaged and unfit for transplant to anyone.
3	3	"The Element of Surprise"	David Frazee	Stephanie Morgenstern & Mark Ellis	July 24, 2008	106	1.086
A group of undercover narcotics officers requires the SRU's assistance to serve a warrant and arrest to a major drug dealer who has been under surveillance and the subject of an ongoing undercover operation. However, the drug bust turns out complicated when an old friend arrives in the dealer's apartment. Through a series of unplanned events, the undercover officer at the scene has his cover blown. Ed and Sam clash over tactics and protocol in the aftermath.
4	4	"Asking for Flowers"	Clark Johnson	Tassie Cameron	July 31, 2008	108	1.216
When an angry sister takes a police officer hostage, the team has to set aside their own feelings to resolve the situation. However, the situation turns out to be complicated when the hostage may not be who the team thinks.
5	5	"Who's George?"	Holly Dale	Adam Barken	August 7, 2008	107	1.300
When an infamous bank robber known as the "Monday Morning Robber" holds up a bank, Team One is alerted to the scene. The team soon realizes that the bank robber is not the Monday Morning Robber, but a disgruntled and angry former employee who was fired by a ruthless new manager. Unable to care for his wife, who has Alzheimer's disease, he seeks revenge against the manager who fired him.
6	6	"Attention Shoppers"	Holly Dale	Tracey Forbes	August 14, 2008	103	1.186
Tasha Redford is an awkward 16-year-old schoolgirl with a chronically alcoholic mother who becomes the target of an intimidation campaign by a gang of local girls led by Brianna Tulley. This is after she reports an attempted molestation and rape against Michael Dacosta, Brianna's gang member boyfriend, since Brianna is convinced that Tasha tried to flirt with him. When Brianna and her three gang members humiliate Tasha in the bathroom at a local shopping mall holding her down and using scissors to cut Tasha's hair off, Tasha retaliates by accidentally shooting Cassaundra, one of the gang members. Team One is called in to the scene, where they find that the situation is not quite as simple as they thought.
7	7	"He Knows His Brother"	Stephen Surjik	Adam Barken	August 21, 2008	105	1.177
A teenager goes AWOL from military school to get his younger brother away from their father. He shoots their father after an argument. Things become complicated when the team digs into teen's past and finds a dark secret hidden behind the facade of a reputable lawyer father and husband and his seemingly perfect family. The teenager uses his survival tactics learned at military school to evade the police, and Sam must reach out to the desperate teenager before his increasingly dangerous methods kill someone, and he has to seek help from his younger brother.
8	8	"Never Kissed a Girl"	Charles Binamé	Esta Spalding	September 11, 2008	109	1.289
A young man named Michael Jamison holds Ed and a courthouse employee hostage, demanding to see the lead prosecutor who sent him to prison for rape and murder. The SRU members try to safely rescue Ed and arrest Michael, without incurring losses.
9	9	"Planets Aligned"	Kelly Makin	Tracey Forbes	September 18, 2008	110	1.456
Team One is called in to lead the search and rescue for a young girl kidnapped from her home. While on the job, they learn that one of the abductors is a teen girl who went missing herself eight years earlier. They learn that the teen girl has developed a Stockholm syndrome towards her abductor and that she trusts him with her life, exchanging threats with the police and brandishing a shotgun. Now, they have to convince her that he was lying the whole time and have to return both her and the young girl to their parents.
10	10	"Eagle Two"	Stephen Surjik	Tassie Cameron	January 9, 2009	104	1.269
Team One is assigned to protect a VIP and his wife at a business forum, when a bomb explodes, the team realizes that the bomb was a distraction engineered by a group of Chilean protesters so they can kidnap the VIP's wife. The kidnapping turns to horror when the wife is found alive with a remote-controlled collar bomb around her neck, and with the Chileans demanding that the VIP confesses to the crimes they believe he committed at a mine in South America. Sam and Jules share their first kiss.
11	11	"Backwards Day"	Érik Canuel	Esta Spalding	January 16, 2009	112	1.741
A distraught wife holds a woman hostage at knifepoint in her own home whom she suspects is having an affair with her husband. The hostage swears she is not involved with the husband, but the wife refuses to believe her and demands she tells the truth about him. Tension mounts on the team when Parker takes Ed out of the field to run the command post from the truck, because he believes Ed's exhaustion is causing him to lose focus. The situation gets more difficult when the hostage admits she is pregnant with her captor's husband's child.
12	12	"Haunting the Barn"	David Frazee	Mark Ellis & Stephanie Morgenstern	January 23, 2009	111	1.279
Danny Rangford, an SRU veteran locks himself in the debriefing room at SRU headquarters to commit suicide. Ed is called in to talk Danny down from being suicidal when it is discovered that he is Ed's former mentor. Now retired from active duty, Danny still has huge guilt over the death of a young boy from a case nearly 20 years old, and they have to talk to him to let it go. Jules, Spike and Lou deal with an IED threat.
13	13	"Between Heartbeats"	David Frazee	Mark Ellis, Stephanie Morgenstern & Tassie Cameron	February 13, 2009	113	1.292
The city is held hostage by a young sharp sniper who takes control of city hall, and Team One is called in to handle the sniper. The team learns that the sniper is deliberately missing his targets and that he has a grudge against Ed Lane. They soon learn that the sniper is Petar Tomasić, the son of the Croatian immigrant Ed shot at First York Plaza a year ago, and who is revealed to be a former sniper of the Croatian Armored Guard Brigade seeking for revenge, armed with a high-scoped HK G3.

=== Season 2 (2009) ===
No. overall	No. in season	Title	Directed by	Written by	Original release date	Prod. code	Canada viewers (millions)
14	1	"Business as Usual"	David Frazee	Mark Ellis & Stephanie Morgenstern	February 27, 2009	201	1.339
Three men who recently lost their homes to bank foreclosures take the CEO of their mortgage society hostage. While Ed and Sam search for the shooter, Parker tries to talk down the third man, who has doused himself in gasoline and is threatening to immolate himself on live television if his demands are not met. Parker must find a replacement for Jules while she is recovering from her gunshot wound, finally settling on Donna Sabine.
15	2	"The Fortress"	Érik Canuel	Ian Weir	March 6, 2009	202	1.367
Two children, their Russian nanny, and a neighbor are taken hostage when they walk in on a group of armed burglars in the children's home. The SRU comes in to negotiate, but the stand-off escalates when Mischa, the leader of the thieves, kills one of the hostages when he feels the SRU is not taking him seriously.
16	3	"Clean Hands"	David Frazee	Adam Barken	March 13, 2009	203	1.350
Team One is tasked to protect a serial killer who has confessed to his crimes and is now returning to Canada from Germany. The party is attacked and Sam is taken hostage by a victim's father looking to take the law into his own hands. In order to negotiate Sam's release, Parker makes a call to leave the killer in the hands of a transit agent who, unknown to him, is also looking for revenge of her own.
17	4	"Aisle 13"	Stephen Surjik	James Hurst	April 3, 2009	204	1.346
Two teenagers find themselves with hostages when their attempted robbery of a supermarket goes awry. With Jules still recovering from her sustained gunshot wound, Sam decides it is time to discuss their relationship.
18	5	"The Perfect Family"	Érik Canuel	Adam Barken & John Callaghan	April 10, 2009	205	1.339
A young woman named Jessie Wyeth—who has given her son up for adoption—and her boyfriend, Terry Dornan, decide they want their infant child back. They kidnap the baby from his adoptive family and demand a lawyer find a way to rescind the adoption. Recognizing Terry's pain at never having had a family of his own, Parker begins negotiations, but is put in a position where he has to choose to save either Terry or the baby. He chooses to save the baby, but Terry jumps to his death.
19	6	"Remote Control"	Charles Biname	Russ Cochrane	April 24, 2009	206	1.277
A young man is persuaded by his half-brother to use his position at an electronic bank to end his half-brother's gambling debt. However, as soon as the transaction is completed, his half-brother reveals that a Mexican gang has kidnapped the young man's pregnant wife and is demanding $500,000 in exchange for her life. Team One lets the stand-off play in an attempt to rescue the woman from her captors.
20	7	"Perfect Storm"	Holly Dale	Tassie Cameron	May 1, 2009	207	1.365
Jules is officially back. A student brings a gun to school to carry out revenge attacks against some bullies who humiliated him in front of the whole school. The situation is complicated when a local police officer on-scene believes the boy has killed his son and goes looking for revenge of his own.
21	8	"Last Dance"	Charles Biname	Mark Ellis & Stephanie Morgenstern	May 8, 2009	208	1.149
When Laura, a woman who finds out that she has a brain disease, decides she wants to end her own life, her fiancé Evan promises her one night where they will do whatever she wants before administering a fatal overdose of morphine. After skipping out on a restaurant bill and robbing a pawn shop, they take hostages at a wedding reception where they plan on killing themselves after one last dance.
22	9	"Exit Wounds"	David Frazee	Russ Cochrane	May 15, 2009	209	1.223
A young boy, Mattie, is shot after witnessing a local gang killing. His brother Derek takes him to a hospital, but the gang pursue them, intent on killing any witnesses to the crime. The SRU arrive on-scene and must stop Derek and the gang from killing one another. Derek surrenders, but Mattie is convinced that there are more gang members looking for him and they will only back down if he kills them first.
23	10	"One Wrong Move"	David Frazee	Mark Ellis, Stephanie Morgenstern & James Hurst	Canada: September 25, 2009 US: June 4, 2010	210	1.882
A series of bomb threats are made by an environmentalist extremist group. Team One have just 90 minutes to end the threat, and reach out to the surviving members of a dormant extremist group for help. While Spike disarms one bomb, Lou accidentally steps on a landmine while approaching the second. While the SRU locate the bomber – revealed to be the daughter of the original extremists – Spike attempts to save his friend.
24	11	"Never Let You Down"	Ken Girotti	James Hurst & Shelley Scarrow	Canada: October 2, 2009 US: June 11, 2010	211	1.575
A young woman is kidnapped from her apartment. At first her abusive ex-boyfriend is the suspect. After tracking down the ex-boyfriend, the team learns of a delusional man who insists she is his missing daughter. Team One's newest recruit, Leah Kerns, started with the SRU.
25	12	"Just a Man"	Holly Dale	Riley Adams	Canada: October 9, 2009 US: July 9, 2010	212	1.342
Convicted murderer Anton Burrows is up for parole. The victim's daughter and wife attend and make a statement to keep Burrows incarcerated. As they leave the meeting, a prison riot breaks out, trapping the civilians. Burrows takes them as hostages to protect them from the other prisoners. As Team 1 attempts to contain the prisoners and restore order, Spike discovers that the riot is not an attempted break-out, but an uprising by one prison gang against another.
26	13	"Custody"	Paul A. Kaufman	Bob Carney	Canada: October 16, 2009 US: June 25, 2010	213	1.642
After winning custody of his children in court, a man takes his wife's lawyer hostage and leaves Team One searching for answers. Jules discovers that the children have been kidnapped and their mother is unaware of their disappearance. Ending the stand-off in the lawyer's office, the SRU realise that the mother conspired with her boyfriend and her lawyer's assistant to stage a parental abduction and escape to Ireland in case her ex-husband wins the custody.
27	14	"Coming to You Live"	Charles Biname	Ian Weir	Canada: October 23, 2009 US: July 2, 2010	214	1.560
A radio talk show host is hunted down by the SRU when he takes a politician hostage and threatens to kill the man live on air if he does not confess to being a murderer. The talk show host believes his hostage used his family's money to cover up a drunk driving crash that left a young man dead.
28	15	"The Farm"	Érik Canuel	Story by : Ian Weir; Teleplay by : Melissa R. Byer & Treena Hancock	Canada: October 30, 2009 US: June 18, 2010	215	1.871
The SRU responds to a woman holding hostages at a convenience store. They free the hostages and capture the woman, who informs them she ran away from a small community known as The Farm after hearing plans of an attempt to commit murder on its residents. Ed and Jules enter The Farm and discover that it is a cult, but Ed is captured by their leader, Charles. The SRU must find a way in to rescue Ed and save the lives of the residents.
29	16	"You Think You; Know Someone"	David Frazee	Adam Barken	Canada: November 6, 2009 US: July 30, 2010	216	1.816
Parker is lured into a trap after being called away on undisclosed personal business. Ed leads Team One to track him down, finding a meth lab on the waterfront. Parker's captors demand that he reveal a secret from his time as a homicide detective, or else they will kill him. Parker's secret concerns an 8-year-old girl named Hayley, whose mother died during a shootout when Parker and his colleagues served a warrant on her home. Parker's captors are convinced that he shot Hayley's mother and then covered up the truth and has been taking care of Hayley out of guilt.
30	17	"The Good Citizen"	Tim Southam	Peter Mitchell	Canada: November 13, 2009 US: July 23, 2010	217	1.771
After driving off two thugs who trashed his local bar, Robert Cooper takes the law into his own hands. It is revealed that he lost his brother to a drug overdose, and he is working his way up the chain of command of the drug dealers. Team One follows the trail of injured drug dealers to try and stop Cooper before he kills someone. They follow him to the Steele brothers, two rich men who started dealing drugs when they were cut off by their family.
31	18	"Behind the Blue Line"	David Frazee	Mark Ellis & Stephanie Morgenstern	Canada: November 20, 2009 US: July 9, 2010	218	1.589
Team One is called in to a hockey arena that is scheduled for demolition when shots are fired inside. The subject is Darren Kovacs, a former soldier suffering from survivor's guilt after his friends were killed in Afghanistan. Kovacs has returned to the arena because it is the only place he feels comfortable. Sam uses his experiences at war to try and talk Kovacs down, but Kovacs takes Spike hostage, leaving Ed with no choice but to shoot him. Sam is torn between his belief that he could have talked Kovacs down and his shared experiences of Afghanistan, leading him to question his place on the team.

=== Season 3 (2010–11) ===
No. overall	No. in season	Title	Directed by	Written by	Original release date	Prod. code	Canada viewers (millions)
32	1	"Unconditional Love"	David Frazee	Mark Ellis & Stephanie Morgenstern	July 16, 2010	301	1.334
A planned raid on an escaped convict sees the man take a teenage boy and a baby hostage at a drive-in motel. Team One raids the room and ends the stand-off, but the teenager inexplicably vanishes. Discovering a hidden trapdoor leading to a sewer and a cache of information that suggests the teenager is a serial killer, Ed leads Sam and Wordy in an effort to stop the boy before he kills someone. However, Parker and Jules discover more information about the boy that suggests he is not a psychopath, but has Asperger syndrome. Ed clashes with his younger brother, Roy, who ignored Ed's order not to approach the situation, and got his partner killed.
33	2	"Severed Ties"	Holly Dale	Treena Hancock & Melissa R. Byer	August 6, 2010	302	1.452
Two children are abducted by a woman wielding a knife with no apparent motive. The SRU learns that she has recently been released from prison and is looking to reclaim her children, who were put into foster care when she was convicted. The girls were legally adopted while she was in prison, however, and she has no legal claim to being their mother. When one of the girls has an allergic reaction, the woman takes hostages in a drug store, demanding that they treat her daughter.
34	3	"Follow the Leader"	David Frazee	James Hurst	August 13, 2010	303	1.267
Team One is tipped off to a white supremacist group who is planning a spate of bombings against immigrants across the city. The team is able to apprehend most of the members, but three bombers escape and the SRU must find them before their bombs are detonated. One is caught before he can plant his bomb, but his capture alerts his friend, who announces his intention to detonate his bomb in a busy government building.
35	4	"Whatever It Takes"	Holly Dale	Grame Manson	August 20, 2010	304	1.558
The SRU responds to an abduction of a high school student, Carlton, but he flees once he has been rescued. He is spotted on the roof of his school the next day, threatening to jump. Parker approaches him, and the SRU learns that his friend, Cory, has kidnapped him and beat him up. SRU investigation in the story reveals about the abusive gym basketball coach who beats his players up and keeps them in fear to motivate them. The team must save Carlton as well as talk down Cory, who has taken the coach prisoner.
36	5	"The Other Lane"	Érik Canuel	Bobby Theodore	September 3, 2010	306	1.508
When Team One responds to a "shots fired" call, they discover Ed's brother, Roy, is deeply involved with an arms dealer. Suspended from duty and suspected of stealing $100,000 from an evidence locker, Roy has infiltrated the arms dealer's operations as a buyer to prove he is a good officer, and intends to get revenge against the man who sold the gun that killed his partner. Roy leads Ed and the SRU to the heart of dealer's operations, but is forced to break his cover to save Jules, leading to a three-way standoff.
37	6	"Jumping at Shadows"	Kelly Makin	Mark Ellis & Stephanie Morgenstern	September 10, 2010	308	1.607
Alexis, a grade-school girl who has built a relationship with a 911 operator over the course of a series of false alarms, appears to be threatened with a real kidnapping. Team One learns that Alexis and her family are federally protected witnesses, after she witnessed the murder of her friend by three corrupt police officers, who are now in pursuit. Alexis ends up running on her own, believing she is alone in the world. Greg's son, Dean, comes to the station.
38	7	"Acceptable Risk"	David Frazee	Pam Davis	September 17, 2010	309	1.800
Team One becomes the subject of an investigation into its handling of a horrific killing spree at business party held in a city museum. Facing criticism for taking 37 minutes to bring the situation under control when similar situations had been contained within 15 minutes, the team members recount their actions. During the interrogations, Ed discovers that the investigating agent is out to remove Parker from duty.
39	8	"Collateral Damage"	Kelly Makin	Aaron Brindle	Canada: January 4, 2011 US: May 6, 2011	305	1.595
After his wife's testimony on his behalf at his murder trial of their daughter doesn't go as planned, Frank McCormick finds himself in a prisoner transport van with a fellow prisoner who has an escape plan. Frank uses his escape to try and prove the evidence presented at his trial is faulty. Frank takes hostage the coroner who performed the autopsy on his daughter.
40	9	"Thicker Than Blood"	David Frazee	Andrea Stevens	Canada: January 11, 2011 US: May 13, 2011	307	1.524
What looks like a man anxious to withdraw a large sum of money from his own account turns into a bank robbery. Team One discovers that the man, whose identity was stolen by the bank robber, has been kidnapped, and a ransom of $40,000 is demanded before a bone marrow donation will be done to save Chris, a child with leukemia. Jules goes to the hospital where she finds Ava, Chris's mother. She reveals who is Chris's biological father.
41	10	"Terror"	Érik Canuel	Melissa R. Byer & Treena Hancock	Canada: January 18, 2011 US: June 3, 2011	311	1.396
On Jules' day off, a man with a handgun holds patrons hostage in a restaurant. The suspect is convinced that there is a terrorist bomb about to go off and demands the presence of the restaurant owner, who is of Middle Eastern descent, who is accused of being the lead terrorist. The SRU interviews the owner, who admits donating to a charity that was later discovered to be a front for terrorism money laundering, however the federal investigation concluded that the owner was not connected to any terrorists. The SRU also finds that the suspect is schizophrenic, which, combined with recent terrorism news coverage, heightens his suspicious.
42	11	"No Promises"	Charles Binamé	Russ Cochrane	Canada: January 25, 2011 US: May 20, 2011	310	1.584
When a police car transporting prisoners crashes with a bus, the prisoners escape to the bus with the unconscious officer's gun. When the police officer responding to the crash is shot, the SRU is called to the scene. The driver of the car involved in the crash is identified as Sgt. McCoy from 52 division, and Spike's mentor. During the hostage rescue, McCoy and the prisoners disappear, and it appears McCoy has taken the prisoners. Spike has a hard time accepting that his former mentor is involved with corruption and drug dealers. The team surmises that McCoy may be acting to save his daughter, a former drug addict.
43	12	"I'd Do Anything"	Helen Shaver	Pamela Davis & Bobby Theodore	Canada: February 1, 2011 US: June 10, 2011	312	1.342
Jackie (Rachel Blanchard) is working as a snitch on her boyfriend Alexander Carson's credit card cloning operation. When Jackie reports that the in-person meeting between her boyfriend and Mark Griffin, a big player in data theft who is looking to buy the operation, is going to happen that night at Carson's club, Detective Merry Danner works with Team One to shut them down. Carson's best friend, Tom, inadvertently ruins Team One's plan to contain the bust. In the confusion, Carson and Jackie escape, forcing Tom to come with them. The three become paranoid as to whom is the snitch and begin to turn on each other. Team One ultimately catches up with Jackie and Carson at the airport. All the while, Ed is struggling with an ultimatum from his wife.
44	13	Fault Lines (Part 1)	David Frazee	Mark Ellis & Stephanie Morgenstern	Canada: February 6, 2011 US: June 17, 2011	313	1.317
Members of Team One try to figure out who has it in for them when a military psychologist, Dr. Toth, with the reputation of being a "team breaker" is brought in to run their routine psych evaluations, instead of the usual evaluations by Sgt. Parker.

=== Season 4 (2011) ===
The fourth season of Flashpoint premiered on July 8, 2011. In the United States, the show moved from CBS to Ion Television after "Shockwave."

No. overall	No. in season	Title	Directed by	Written by	Original release date	Prod. code	Canada viewers (millions)
45	1	Personal Effects (Part 2)	Kelly Makin	Mark Ellis & Stephanie Morgenstern	July 8, 2011	401	1.369
Team One is called in to pursue Ed's shooter. Ed refuses treatment for his injuries so he can be with his wife who is having problems delivering their baby. Ed's shooter turns out to be a man married to a military wife under duress from drug gangs based in Afghanistan. The team pulls a risky move to catch the culprit. Team One gets cleared for duty but is kept on probation. Dr. Toth is highly skeptical of Sgt. Parker's ability to be objective. Sam and Jules covertly resume their relationship.
46	2	"Good Cop"	John Fawcett	Michael MacLennan	July 15, 2011	402	1.508
Team One has to protect a cop, Greely, who is on trial for shooting a teenager. Greely is cleared of all charges, but feels bitter from the trial and guilty from the shooting. The victim's father incites a mob, demanding justice for his son's death. The event soon turns violent, with certain members of the mob seeking to kill Greely.
47	3	"Run, Jaime, Run"	Kelly Makin	Ian Weir	July 22, 2011	403	1.537
The team goes after a corporate robber who streams his robberies on the Internet and has thousands of followers. However, the robber plans on making a "grand finale," unaware that he's being duped by the stepson of a philanthropist, posing as a teenage girl, into assassinating his neglectful father, who ignores and humiliates his son constantly.
48	4	"Through a Glass Darkly"	John Fawcett	Andrew Wreggitt	July 29, 2011	404	1.430
A teenage girl named Jess Fuller is abducted while on her way to school. When her bothersome mother, Sue, tries to save her, she is taken too. The abductors attempt to scam Elaine Stearns, an estranged grandmother by convincing her the daughter is being mistreated. The SRU is called to pursue an investigation, inadvertently exposing a dark family secret.
49	5	"The Better Man"	David Frazee	Michael MacLennan	August 5, 2011	405	1.254
During a drug bust, one member of Team One struggles with a secret that could jeopardize the member's career. The situation worsens when the undercover officer in the drug cartel becomes too emotionally involved with the cartel leader's girlfriend and refuses help from Team One for the major arrest. After defusing the event, Team One meets up for an important announcement by one of their members.
50	6	"A Day in the Life"	Jim Donovan	Mark Ellis & Stephanie Morgenstern	August 12, 2011	406	1.406
A new recruit, Raf, replaces Wordy on Valentine's Day, traditionally one of the toughest days of the year for hostage and suicide situations. Team One splits up to defuse three cases: a suicidal widower; a mom holding her daughter's manager of a strip club hostage; and a recently fired man who is obsessively infatuated with his boss, and brings a gun to his former office.
51	7	"Shockwave"	David Frazee	Larry Bambrick	August 19, 2011	407	1.313
Spike must leave his dying father's bedside to help Team One defuse its largest bomb threat yet. Two smaller bombs go off in a building, trapping Spike, Raf, Sam and six other civilians underground. Spike then discovers a complex chemical bomb designed to produce a bigger explosion. The bomber turns out to be one of the civilians trapped underground. Spike must figure out how to deactivate the bomb before it explodes. Note: This was the final episode of the series to be co-produced by CBS Television Studios. Ion Television would assume CBS' duties from the next episode forward.
52	8	"Grounded"	David Frazee	Karen Walton	Canada: September 19, 2011 US: October 18, 2011	412	1.536
Team One is called when a group of armed hijackers forces a passenger jet plane to land. As Parker tries to negotiate with the increasingly desperate criminals, the rest of Team One faces an almost impossible task—how to storm the plane without anyone getting killed. With the help of brave passenger Holly McCord, the team races to find a solution before hijacker Sandra Moore carries out her deadly threats.
53	9	"The War Within"	David Frazee	Daniel Godwin & Michael MacLennan	Canada: September 27, 2011 US: December 13, 2011	408	1.349
Team One responds to a panicked 911 call: a masked gunman is threatening a group of teenagers in the Don Valley ravine and has abducted Joe Stanick. But it turns out this gunman was no stranger to the youths. Joe was the author of a viral video prank that "outed" a fellow student, Ryan Bell, triggering humiliation at school, and an explosive confrontation with his parents. Now, Ryan's engaged in a desperate and violent journey, hoping to win back his parents' acceptance.
54	10	"Cost of Doing Business"	David Frazee	Larry Bambrick	Canada: October 4, 2011 US: October 25, 2011	409	1.309
When a ransom drop goes wrong, Team One is drawn into the dangerous world of "express kidnapping" and the nightmare of a woman haunted by the brutal experience of captivity. Greg finds out about Sam and Jules' secretly renewed relationship.
55	11	"Wild Card"	Brett Sullivan	Karen Walton	Canada: October 11, 2011 US: November 1, 2011	410	1.263
A gambling-addict mother under duress from a loan shark who owes money to the local crime boss, Harvey Micks, is forced to play her life away in order to save the life of her husband and daughter.
56	12	"A New Life"	Kelly Makin	Adam Barken	November 1, 2011 US: November 8, 2011	411	1.293
After a shooting on Donna Sabine's wedding, Team One speculates that the attacks are retaliation made by the local crime family, the Logans, on Donna's former undercover team. Donna's former partner, who accidentally leaked the undercover names, is then forced by the Logan matriarch to try to kill Donna's newly-wedded husband.
57	13	"A Call to Arms"	Érik Canuel	Alex Levine	Canada: November 8, 2011 US: November 22, 2011	413	1.215
A Chinatown gang called the Golden Dragons kidnaps a widower to force his daughter to give up the names of the various store owners building up evidence on the gang's extortion rackets. But a family secret threatens the safety of the hostage.
58	14	"Day Game"	Kelly Makin	Aubrey Nealon	Canada: November 15, 2011 US: November 29, 2011	415	1.191
Team One races to Fletcher Stadium, where a knife-wielding robber has taken a hostage. The situation turns bloody when a security guard tries to be a hero. The guard, Gil Collins, is an ex-cop who had been rejected from the SRU and had set up the robbery in an attempt to prove he had the necessary skills. With that plan failed, he takes Greg hostage, blaming him for his fall from grace, and daring Parker to talk him down.
59	15	"Blue on Blue"	Stefan Pleszczynski	Adam Barken	Canada: November 22, 2011 US: December 6, 2011	416	1.229
Spike responds to a distress call from Sam's sister, Natalie. When he goes to investigate, he finds that she is being held tied up at gunpoint by a duo led by Natalie's ex-boyfriend, criminal David Fleming. With both of their lives on the line-Natalie is later gagged, Spike must help David pull off a robbery of the Metro Evidence Depot, the most heavily guarded facility in the city. Team One later responds and begin an attempt to find and save Spike before it's too late.
60	16	"Team Player"	Kelly Makin	Michael MacLennan	Canada: November 29, 2011 US: January 10, 2012	414	1.452
Team One defuses a conflict at a high-security psychiatric hospital, only to find that a patient, Charlie has escaped. Charlie, who was hospitalized for pushing a classmate to his death for bullying him, took the fall for his friend, who was the real culprit. Now his friend is poised to move out of town, and Charlie wants his name cleared.
61	17	"Priority of Life"	David Frazee	Mark Ellis, Stephanie Morgenstern & Alex Levine	Canada: December 6, 2011 US: January 17, 2012	417	1.317
A man is convinced his former employer, a developer of drugs, has made him sick. He breaks into their laboratory taking hostages and demanding they release the files that prove they caused his illness. While the rest of SRU responds to this situation, Parker meets with Dr. Toth, who informs Parker that he is being suspended.
62	18	"Slow Burn"	Kelly Makin	Mark Ellis & Stephanie Morgenstern	Canada: December 13, 2011 US: January 24, 2012	418	1.208
During the season four finale, Team One races to a hospital when Fire Captain Simon Griggs interrupts the attempted murder of a badly burned firefighter. When they corner the suspect, the team learns he's behind a series of deadly fires in the neighborhood. Fire Captain Griggs is forced to make a horrific choice—one that pushes him to the edge of revenge and suicide. Parker, wrestling with his own decision about his future on Team One, must convince this broken man to live.

=== Season 5 (2012) ===
Flashpoint's fifth and final season premiered on September 23, 2012, on CTV. The series finale aired on December 13, 2012.

No. overall	No. in season	Title	Directed by	Written by	Original release date	Prod. code	Canada viewers (millions)
63	1	"Broken Peace"	Kelly Makin	Daniel Godwin	Canada: September 20, 2012 US: October 16, 2012	501	1.412
Team One tears through the city looking for James Mitchell, an abusive and armed man hunting his ex-wife Michelle, and their daughter May. The situation escalates when he drags his ex-wife to near the edge of a hotel rooftop, where Ed and the rest of the team face a huge moral dilemma between saving the abusive man or letting his daughter become a killer. The dramatic conclusion leaves Team One questioning themselves, each other and even their jobs, as one Team One member decides they can no longer live in the gray area the job requires.
64	2	"No Kind of Life"	Kelly Makin	Aubrey Nealon	Canada: September 27, 2012 US: October 23, 2012	502	1.574
Team One is called to an office building where Dr. Jason Alston has been taken at gunpoint. As the team clears the building, the gunman gets the drop on Sam, forcing him and Jason into a van and revealing a critically injured child. Sam helps Jason stabilize the child's condition, and discovers a history between Jason and the gunman – just as armed men close in, gunning for Brendan and trapping Sam and Jason in the crossfire.
65	3	"Run to Me"	Stefan Pleszcynski	Adam Barken	Canada: October 4, 2012 US: October 30, 2012	503	1.453
As Leah Kerns returns to the team, Team One responds to a bank robbery committed by the Business Card Bandit. As they discover, two teenage girls were involved in the robbery and the gang they belong to has an abusive leader who picks up homeless kids to carry out these heists. When Sarah decides to cut him from their lives, Jules and the team race to stop her before she becomes his next victim.
66	4	"Eyes In"	David Frazee	Aubrey Nealon	Canada: October 11, 2012 US: November 6, 2012	504	1.513
A hacker breaks into the teams computers, and sends them video feeds of crimes in progress. While responding to the crimes, Spike attempts to trace the hacker. The hacker has learned that his student's boyfriend is part of a hijacking ring. Now the boyfriend's boss, who hides his criminal operation behind a legitimate front, holds his girlfriend hostage demanding he find the leak that allowed SRU to stop the crimes.
67	5	"Sons of The Father"	Stefan Pleszcynski	Larry Bambrick	Canada: October 18, 2012 US: November 13, 2012	505	1.496
Team One responds to the abduction of Peggi Walsh, a young nurse taken by a man at knifepoint. With time running out, the team finds the killer's brother and must convince him to unlock the secret of his tragic past to save Peggi's life. Also, Ed feels trepidation over his required meeting with the mother of the teenager who died.
68	6	"Below the Surface"	Brett Sullivan	Daniel Godwin	Canada: October 25, 2012 US: November 27, 2012	506	1.660
A car bomb explodes at a children's party, killing a married couple. As Team One discovers, all the fathers are members of the Brigadiers biker gang, whose leader is killed in the explosion. At first it seems like an attack by a rival gang, but as they later find out, it is in fact a coup being pulled off by a few Brigadiers members. Worse yet, an undercover informant, who was the best friend of the leading detective's deceased son, is exposed, and Team One is in a race against time to prevent the coup and save his life.
69	7	"Forget Oblivion"	Kelly Makin	Mark Ellis & Stephanie Morgenstern	Canada: November 1, 2012 US: December 4, 2012	507	1.456
A young man named Elliot with a brilliant memory is abducted to a high research facility and forced to remember the specifications for a new "smart gun", which the kidnappers intend to sell on the black market. Things get worse when Ed is taken hostage. The team must find a way to save Elliot and Ed while avoiding the dangers of the smart gun.
70	8	"We Take Care of Our Own"	Stefan Pleszczynski	Larry Bambrick	Canada: November 8, 2012 US: December 11, 2012	508	1.380
Jules and Sam find out that Jules is pregnant with Sam's child. The SRU is called in to stop some former soldiers from robbing an armored truck carrying millions of dollars. During the pursuit, they learn about the background of the group leader who tries to maintain a place for ex-military men and women who are struggling with civilian life post-deployment. So dedicated is he to his job, that he tries to sacrifice his life to allow his teammates escape.
71	9	"Lawmen"	David Frazee	Story by : Aubrey Nealon; Teleplay by : Alex Levine & Aubrey Nealon	Canada: November 15, 2012 US: January 8, 2013	509	1.534
When Dean and Clark go on a ride-along with Team One, a shootout breaks out at a drug den. While the team evaluates the situation, Dean and Clark sneak out of the truck to watch the events unfold, and witness someone leaving the scene and hiding a large bag in a garbage can. When Dean and Clark investigate the stash, they find a pile of illegal weapons. They are confronted by the leading sergeant of the undercover unit, who has decided to forgo following the law to take down the gang leader himself.
72	10	"A World of Their Own"	Stefan Pleszczynski	Alex Levine	Canada: November 22, 2012 US: November 20, 2012	510	1.289
A senator is abducted in the midst of a bomb hoax. Team One soon learns the senator plans to develop vast farmland into an airport, and his two kidnappers are farmers who live on that land. One farmer is seeking to keep the land where his deaf nephew feels comfortable, but his cohort seeks to ransom the senator, having learned of bribes paid by farm owners to keep their land. The situation intensifies when the nephew mistakenly assumes the Team shot his uncle. Dean receives his acceptance into university but later tells his father he wants to be a cop.
73	11	"Fit for Duty"	David Frazee	Adam Barken	Canada: November 29, 2012 US: December 18, 2012	511	1.539
In flashback sequences, Ed tells his psychologist Dr. Bell how Team One races to catch a disturbed and armed man on a ferry. This man, Harold Beamer, had kidnapped his neighbour's baby girl, convinced it was his own daughter as a baby once again. At the same time, Ed is still wracked with guilt over the events of killing a young girl and feels he's unfit to be team leader.
74	12	"Keep the Peace (Part 1)"	Kelly Makin	Mark Ellis & Stephanie Morgenstern	Canada: December 6, 2012 US: January 15, 2013	512	1.483
An explosive package planted at the 911 call centre is just the beginning of the most challenging call of Team One's career. A series of bombs in public buildings tears the city apart with terror as the team members juggle high-risk rescues, multiple defusions, and fear for their own loved ones. Team One singles out a suspect, Anson Holt, a former psychiatrist and sadist. The episode ends on a cliffhanger with a deadly confrontation.
75	13	"Keep the Peace (Part 2)"	David Frazee	Mark Ellis & Stephanie Morgenstern	Canada: December 13, 2012 US: January 22, 2013	513	2.077
After the tragic confrontation with Holt, the members of Team One refocus and learn that the perpetrator is Marcus Faber, one of Anson Holt's students and a victim of his sadistic experiments. Team One races across Toronto to defuse all of the remaining bombs. As Parker attempts to disable the last bomb in the catwalks of Fletcher Stadium, Faber catches up and engages him in a firefight. Parker is severely wounded in the fight, while the rest of Team One races to save him. One year later, the surviving team members gather for a reunion.

== Nielsen ratings ==
The following is a table for the United States ratings, based on average total estimated viewers per episode, of Flashpoint on CBS.

=== Season 1 ===
Viewership and ratings per episode of List of Flashpoint episodes
No.	Title	Air date	Rating/share (18–49)	Viewers (millions)
1	"Scorpio"	July 11, 2008	1.9/6	8.13
2	"First In Line"	July 18, 2008	1.5/6	7.11
3	"The Element of Surprise"	July 24, 2008	1.7/5	6.73
4	"Asking for Flowers"	July 31, 2008	1.8/6	7.64
5	"Who's George?"	August 7, 2008	2.1/6	7.17
6	"Attention Shoppers"	August 14, 2008	1.6/4	6.31
7	"He Knows His Brother"	August 21, 2008	1.9/5	7.29
8	"Never Kissed a Girl"	September 11, 2008	2.2/6	8.55
9	"Planets Aligned"	September 18, 2008	2.6/7	9.66
10	"Eagle Two"	January 9, 2009	2.2/6	10.06
11	"Backwards Day"	January 16, 2009	2.3/7	10.38
12	"Haunting the Barn"	January 23, 2009	2.4/7	10.21
13	"Between Heartbeats"	February 13, 2009	1.9/6	8.86

=== Season 2 ===
Viewership and ratings per episode of List of Flashpoint episodes
No.	Title	Air date	Rating/share (18–49)	Viewers (millions)
1	"Business As Usual"	February 27, 2009	1.9/6	9.17
2	"The Fortress"	March 6, 2009	2.0/6	9.80
3	"Clean Hands"	March 13, 2009	1.9/6	9.40
4	"Aisle 13"	April 3, 2009	1.8/6	8.64
5	"The Perfect Family"	April 10, 2009	1.9/6	9.72
6	"Remote Control"	April 24, 2009	1.6/5	8.18
7	"Perfect Storm"	May 1, 2009	2.1/7	9.57
8	"Last Dance"	May 8, 2009	1.8/6	8.64
9	"Exit Wounds"	May 15, 2009	1.8/6	8.42
10	"One Wrong Move"	June 4, 2010	—N/a	—N/a
11	"Never Let You Down"	June 11, 2010	1.2/5	6.72
12	"Just a Man"	July 9, 2010	1.1/4	5.81
13	"Custody"	June 25, 2010	1.1/4	5.60
14	"Coming To You Live"	July 2, 2010	1.1/4	5.60
15	"The Farm"	June 18, 2010	—N/a	—N/a
16	"You Think You Know Someone"	July 30, 2010	1.1/4	5.71
17	"The Good Citizen"	July 23, 2010	1.2/4	6.06
18	"Behind the Blue Line"	July 9, 2010	1.2/4	6.10

=== Season 3 ===
Viewership and ratings per episode of List of Flashpoint episodes
No.	Title	Air date	Rating/share (18–49)	Viewers (millions)
1	"Unconditional Love"	July 16, 2010	1.1/4	5.76
2	"Severed Ties"	August 6, 2010	1.2/4	6.23
3	"Follow the Leader"	August 13, 2010	1.2/4	6.52
4	"Whatever It Takes"	August 20, 2010	1.3/4	6.40
5	"The Other Lane"	September 3, 2010	1.0/3	5.86
6	"Jumping at Shadows"	September 10, 2010	1.1/4	6.09
7	"Acceptable Risk"	September 17, 2010	1.2/4	6.15
8	"Collateral Damage"	May 6, 2011	1.1/4	6.94
9	"Thicker Than Blood"	May 13, 2011	1.3/5	7.64
10	"Terror"	May 20, 2011	1.1/5	6.90
11	"No Promises"	June 3, 2011	0.9/3	6.71
12	"I'd Do Anything"	June 10, 2011	1.0/4	6.01
13	"Fault Lines"	June 17, 2011	0.8/3	5.93

=== Season 4 ===
Viewership and ratings per episode of List of Flashpoint episodes
No.	Title	Air date	Rating/share (18–49)	Viewers (millions)
1	"Personal Effects"	July 8, 2011	1.2/5	6.37
2	"Good Cop"	July 15, 2011	1.2/5	6.13
3	"Run, Jaime, Run"	July 22, 2011	1.2/5	6.34
4	"Through a Glass Darkly"	July 29, 2011	1.2/5	6.80
5	"The Better Man"	August 5, 2011	1.1/4	6.33
6	"A Day in the Life"	August 12, 2011	1.1/4	6.18
7	"Shockwave"	August 19, 2011	1.0/4	5.85
8	"Grounded"	October 18, 2011	0.6/2	1.30
9	"The War Within"	December 13, 2011	TBD	TBD
10	"Cost of Doing Business"	October 25, 2011	TBD	TBD
11	"Wild Card"	November 1, 2011	TBD	TBD
12	"A New Life"	November 8, 2011	TBD	TBD
13	"A Call to Arms"	November 22, 2011	TBD	TBD
14	"Day Game"	November 29, 2011	0.4/2	TBD
15	"Blue on Blue"	December 6, 2011	TBD	TBD
16	"Slow Burn"	December 13, 2011	TBD	TBD

== Related Links ==
- Flashpoint (TV series)
