= X Company =

2015 Canadian-Hungarian TV series or program

- Created by: Mark Ellis; Stephanie Morgenstern
- Starring: Evelyne Brochu; Jack Laskey; Warren Brown; Dustin Milligan; Connor Price; Hugh Dillon; Lara Jean Chorostecki; Torben Liebrecht
- Countries of origin: Canada; Hungary
- Original languages: English; German
- No. of seasons: 3
- No. of episodes: 28

Production
- Executive producers: Mark Ellis; Stephanie Morgenstern; David Fortier; Bill Haber; Ivan Schneeberg
- Running time: 44 minutes
- Production companies: Temple Street Productions; Pioneer Stillking Films

Original release
- Network: CBC Television
- Release: February 18, 2015 – March 15, 2017

X Company is a spy thriller television series created by Mark Ellis and Stephanie Morgenstern, who previously created the CTV series Flashpoint, which aired from 2008 to 2012. The series premiered on February 18, 2015, on CBC Television. Taking place during World War II, the series follows five recruits as they are trained as agents at a secret Canadian training facility, Camp X near Lake Ontario east of Toronto and then sent out into the field in Europe. The final episode of the series aired on CBC on March 15, 2017.

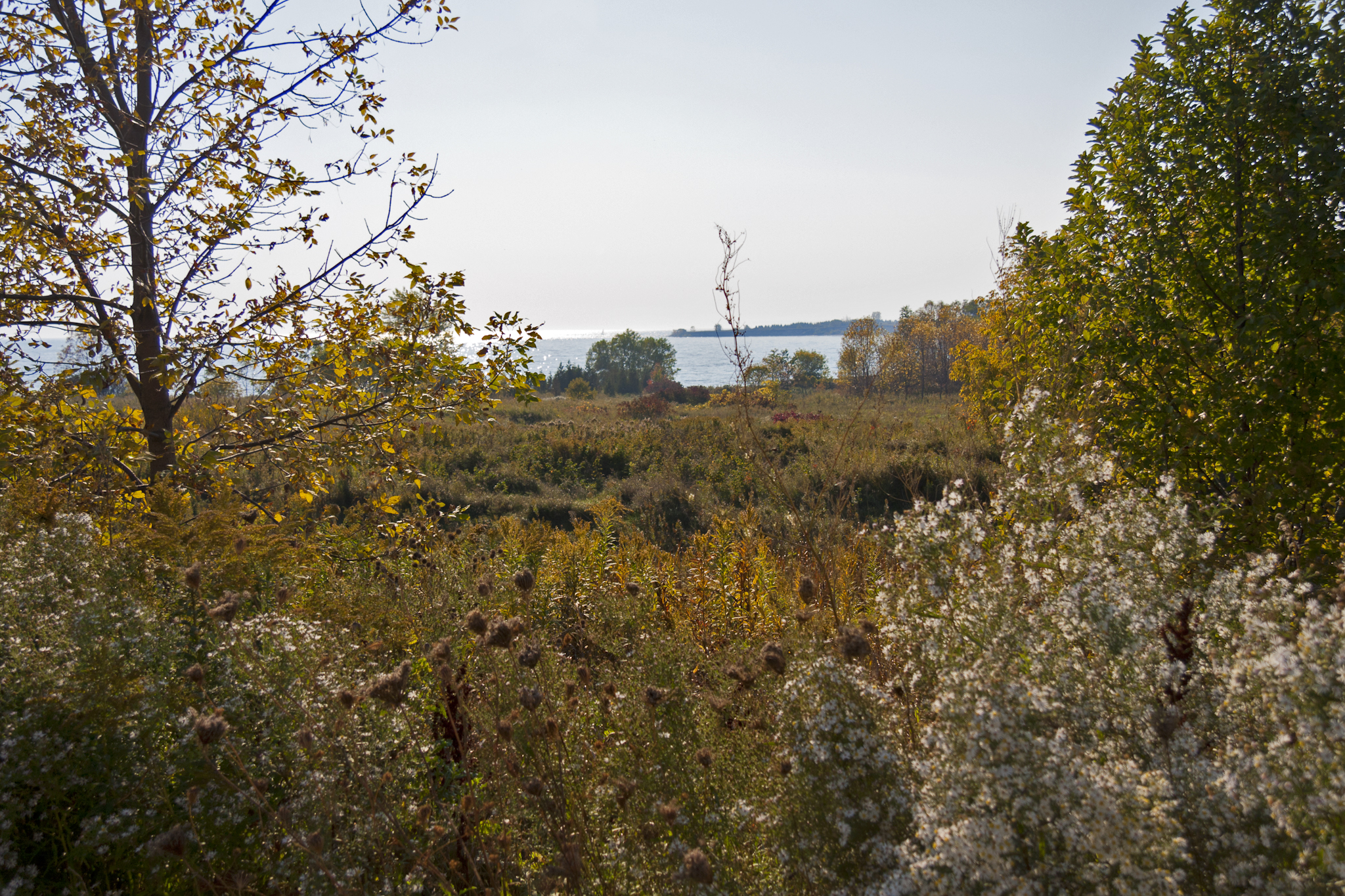
A view of part of the site of Camp X looking toward Lake Ontario.

X Company was produced by Temple Street and Pioneer Stillking Kft. Mark Ellis and Stephanie Morgenstern wrote some episodes and were also executive producers with Ivan Schneeberg, David Fortier, Kerry Appleyard (Temple Street) and Bill Haber (Ostar Productions). Directors included Grant Harvey, Amanda Tapping, Paolo Barzman, Julian Gilbey and Stephanie Morgenstern.

On March 4, 2015, CBC renewed the series for a second season with ten episodes, two more than the first season of eight. On March 31, 2016, CBC announced that the series would be renewed for a ten-episode third season, to début in the winter of 2017. On September 1, 2016, it was announced that this would be the final season for the show.

== International distribution ==
The series was shown in several countries, via distribution by Sony Pictures Television. Broadcasters that aired the series included TF1 in France, History in Latin America, History in the UK, Mystery in Japan, D-Smart in Turkey, 365 Media in Iceland, MBC in the Middle East, Mega in Greece and by Pickbox in Slovenia and Bosnia/Herzegovina. On April 2, 2017, the series was picked up by Ovation in the United States.

== Cast ==
Name	Portrayed by	Seasons		
Name	Portrayed by	1	2	3
Aurora Luft	Evelyne Brochu	Main		
Alfred Graves	Jack Laskey	Main		
Neil Mackay	Warren Brown	Main		
Harry James	Connor Price	Main		
Tom Cummings	Dustin Milligan	Main		
Duncan Sinclair	Hugh Dillon	Main		
Krystina Breeland	Lara Jean Chorostecki	Main		
Franz Faber	Torben Liebrecht	Main		
Sabine Faber	Livia Matthes	Main		
Rene Villiers	François Arnaud	Main		

== Production ==
X Company had been an idea being considered for over a dozen years by creators Mark Ellis and Stephanie Morgenstern. They made a short film entitled Remembrance which did well enough on the festival circuit to encourage them to develop a feature script which eventually became X Company. Originally titled Camp X, the series was filmed in Budapest, Hungary, from August to October 2014, and in Orlovat, Serbia and is a Canadian-Hungarian co-production. X Company is inspired by the real spy training facility, Camp X, which was located between Whitby and Oshawa, Ontario, Canada.

Season 2 filmed for four months in Budapest, and Esztergom, Hungary beginning in July 2015. Season 2 aired on January 27 on CBC.

Season 3, the final of the series, was also filmed in and around Budapest, Hungary; location work was completed in November 2016 and the premiere was on January 11, 2017.

== Critical reception ==
Writing in the Huffington Post, Denette Wilford said: "X Company is another history lesson CBC is offering audiences, and it nails it once again". The Globe and Mail's TV critic John Doyle called it "vastly entertaining" and "a good solid thriller".

== Episodes ==
=== Season 1 (2015) ===
No. overall	No. in season	Title	Directed by	Written by	Original air date	Can. viewers
1	1	"Pilot"	David Frazee	Mark Ellis & Stephanie Morgenstern	February 18, 2015	813,000
The team faces a dangerous mission in France, back at the base Duncan must convince a fragile young man with a valuable skill set to join the fight.
2	2	"Trial by Fire"	David Frazee	Mark Ellis & Stephanie Morgenstern	February 25, 2015	N/A
The team must protect Alfred as they parachute into France to steal codes that could save thousands of British lives, an unexpected obstacle forces Tom to stay behind and perform the hard part of the job.
3	3	"Kiss of Death"	John Strickland	Mark Ellis, Stephanie Morgenstern & Hannah Moscovitch	March 4, 2015	N/A
The team infiltrates a brothel and a Nazi headquarters in an attempt to keep atomic research from falling into the wrong hands, Aurora gets ambitious but finds herself in a dangerous situation.
4	4	"Sixes & Sevens"	John Strickland	Denis McGrath	March 11, 2015	N/A
The team is sent to smuggle a British airman out of France with the help of a jazz band, but things get complicated when the Germans capture one of the musicians.
5	5	"Walk with the Devil"	Jamie Stone	Derek Schreyer	March 18, 2015	N/A
Aurora and the team wrestle with whether to trust a Vichy Mayor, who offers rich intelligence in exchange for their help in discovering what has become of the town's young women.
6	6	"In Enemy Hands"	Jamie Stone	Hannah Moscovitch	March 25, 2015	N/A
A sabotage mission leaves Harry critically injured and the team trapped in a safe house, desperate to escape a town swarming with Nazis.
7	7	"Quislings"	Craig Viveiros	Denis McGrath	April 1, 2015	N/A
The team reaches Paris, tasked with assassinating French civilians who collaborate with the Nazis.
8	8	"Into the Fire"	Craig Viveiros	Mark Ellis & Stephanie Morgenstern	April 8, 2015	N/A
As Paris is torn by a massive roundup of Jews, the team must help an early Holocaust witness bring his story to Allied leaders. Meanwhile, German agents close in on Aurora and Alfred.

=== Season 2 (2016) ===
No. overall	No. in season	Title	Directed by	Written by	Original air date	Can. viewers
9	1	"Creon Via London"	Grant Harvey	Mark Ellis & Stephanie Morgenstern	January 27, 2016	521,000
The team is reeling as Alfred is taken by the Gestapo and Tom is shot. With communication cut off, all of the Camp X program may be compromised by Alfred's capture.
10	2	"Night Will End"	Grant Harvey	Hannah Moscovitch	February 3, 2016	N/A
Franz Faber uses increasingly inhuman techniques to get Alfred to break, while Sinclair, now on the ground in France, leads the team on a daring rescue attempt.
11	3	"Schein Und Sein"	Andy Mikita	Adam Barken	February 10, 2016	N/A
The team must find a way to get Alfred and René back. Alfred struggles with what to tell Sinclair.
12	4	"Last Man, Last Round"	Andy Mikita	Sandra Chwialkowska	February 17, 2016	N/A
Alfred risks his life to free British POWs in the hope they can rebuild their resistance networks.
13	5	"Nil Nocere"	Kelly Makin	Denis McGrath	February 24, 2016	N/A
The team searches for a doctor who may be helping Jews escape France; Aurora and Franz's wife grow closer.
14	6	"Black Flag"	Kelly Makin	Daniel Godwin	March 2, 2016	N/A
Harry makes a plan to assassinate a German general, defying Aurora's orders. Guest star: Urs Rechn
15	7	"La Vérité Vous Rendra Libre"	Amanda Tapping	Adam Barken	March 9, 2016	N/A
Aurora tries to maintain her leadership; an attack by German commandos threatens the team.
16	8	"Fatherland"	Amanda Tapping	Mark Ellis & Stephanie Morgenstern & Sandra Chwialkowska	March 16, 2016	N/A
The Gestapo plan to wipe out Camp X is underway, and while the rest of the team heads to Dieppe, Aurora gets caught in a showdown.
17	9	"Butcher and Bolt"	Jamie Stone	Denis McGrath	March 23, 2016	N/A
Aurora fights to regain her team's faith as Alfred finally reveals their Dieppe objectives: a raid on a German radar station in the midst of the Allied attack, and a daring attempt to steal the secrets of the Enigma machine.
18	10	"August 19th"	Jamie Stone	Mark Ellis & Stephanie Morgenstern	April 6, 2016	N/A
The team pays a devastating price at Dieppe as Alfred and Aurora put everything on the line to try to "turn" Franz Faber.

=== Season 3 (2017) ===
No. overall	No. in season	Title	Directed by	Written by	Original release date
19	1	"Creon Vs. Ixion"	Grant Harvey	Mark Ellis & Stephanie Morgenstern	January 11, 2017
Spymasters Sinclair and Faber face off: two world-class poker players gambling with human lives. Neil and Harry face a harrowing road trip to find Miri.
20	2	"Masquerade"	Grant Harvey	Sandra Chwialkowska	January 18, 2017
The team uncovers "Operation Marigold," a top-secret Nazi operation that could propel the Germans to victory.
21	3	"One for the Moon"	Paolo Barzman	Daniel Godwin	January 25, 2017
With all of France about to be occupied by the Nazis, the team tries to rally a nation. Meanwhile, Faber's transfer to Poland could cost them their most prized asset.
22	4	"Promises"	Paolo Barzman	Nicolas Billon	February 1, 2017
Sinclair orders his team to follow Faber to Poland and zero in on Operation Marigold. But the road to get there proves to be deadly.
23	5	"Frontiers"	Julian Gilbey	Jillian Locke	February 8, 2017
The team must free Faber from the Polish resistance as Aurora goes undercover to take on a new and disturbing job.
24	6	"Supply and Demand"	Julian Gilbey	Julie Puckrin	February 15, 2017
Aurora struggles to keep her cover as Helene Bauer as the Nazis hunt for spies among the Polish resistance.
25	7	"The Hunt"	Amanda Tapping	Sandra Chwialkowska	February 22, 2017
Aurora learns of an imminent attack on the village of Nadzieja, Poland. Meanwhile Neil, Alfred and the Resistance fighters launch into a fierce battle.
26	8	"Naqam"	Amanda Tapping	Mark Ellis & Stephanie Morgenstern & Julie Puckrin	March 1, 2017
The team's mission begins to unravel when Heidi discovers Aurora is a spy.
27	9	"Friendly Fire"	Stephanie Morgenstern	Daniel Godwin	March 8, 2017
Sinclair and Krystina join the team in Berlin as they plan to assassinate the man who could win the war for the Nazis.
28	10	"Remembrance"	Stephanie Morgenstern	Mark Ellis & Stephanie Morgenstern	March 15, 2017
The team's final mission could change the course of the war. Aurora needs Faber's help to land the knockout blow…but can he be trusted?
