= Final Curtain =

Final Curtain may refer to:

== Film and television ==
- Final Curtain (film), a 1957 television pilot written and directed by Ed Wood
- The Final Curtain (film), a 2002 British film directed by Patrick Harkins
- The Final Curtain, a 2007 independent horror film starring Reggie Bannister

=== Television episodes ===
- "And the Final Curtain", The Librarians (2014) season 2, episode 10 (2015)
- "Final Curtain", Hawthorne season 2, episode 6 (2010)
- "Final Curtain", Mickey Spillane's Mike Hammer (1958) season 1, episode 26 (1958)
- "Final Curtain", Murder, She Wrote season 9, episode 11 (1993)
- "Final Curtain", New Tricks series 5, episode 33 (2008)
- "Final Curtain", Piggy Tales season 3, episode 34 (2017)
- "Final Curtain", The Inspector Alleyn Mysteries series 1, episode 4 (1993)
- "Final Curtain", The Spectacular Spider-Man season 2, episode 13 (2009)
- "Final Curtain", Unusual Suspects: Deadly Intent episode 5 (2017)
- "The Case of the Final Curtain", Sherlock Holmes and Doctor Watson episode 15 (1980)
- "The Final Curtain", City Confidential season 5, episode 10 (2001)
- "The Final Curtain" (Doctors), 2004
- "The Final Curtain", Growing Up Creepie episode 13b (2007)
- "The Final Curtain" (Miranda), 2015
- "The Final Curtain", Murdoch Mysteries season 13, episode 8 (2019)
- "The Final Curtain", Saved by the Bell: The New Class season 4, episode 13 (1996)
- "The Final Curtain Part 1", Keeping Up with the Kardashians season 20, episode 13 (2021)
- "The Final Curtain Part 2", Keeping Up with the Kardashians season 20, episode 14 (2021)
- "The Final Curtain" (The Green Green Grass), 2007
- "The Final Curtain", The Legend of Calamity Jane episode 6 (1998)
- "The Final Curtain", The New Adventures of Charlie Chan season 1, episode 11 (1957)
- "The Finals Curtain", Boston Common season 2, episode 11 (1996)

== Literature ==
- Final Curtain (novel), a 1947 novel by Ngaio Marsh
- Final Curtain, a 1964 Johnny Liddell novel by Frank Kane
- The Final Curtain, a 1991 novel by Gilbert Morris; the second entry in The Danielle Ross Mysteries series
- Final Curtain, a 2006 children's novel by Philip Ardagh; the third and final entry in The Further Adventures of Eddie Dickens trilogy
- The Final Curtain, a 2008 novel by Deborah Abela; the tenth entry in the Max Remy Superspy series
- The Final Curtain, a 2023 novel by Keigo Higashino; the ninth entry in the Police Detective Kaga series

== Other media ==
- The Final Curtain, a 2007 compilation album and DVD by Pompano Beach

== See also ==
- Curtain (disambiguation)
- Curtain call (disambiguation)
