= Mark Morgenstern =

Mark Morgenstern is a Canadian director, cinematographer and editor from Montreal, Quebec.

== Filmography (partial) ==
- Refuge (2008), a documentary on rebels in Darfur by Alexandre Trudeau, as editor
- Je fonds en comble (2008) as co-director and cinematographer
- Remembrance (2001) as cinematographer
- Shooter (2000) as director
- Curtains (1995) as co-director (with his sister Stephanie Morgenstern) and cinematographer
