= Curtain (disambiguation) =

A curtain is a piece of cloth intended to block or obscure light or similar.

Curtain or curtains may also refer to:

== Arts and entertainment ==
=== Film ===
- Curtain (film), an American silent film
- Curtains (1983 film), a Canadian horror film
- Curtains (1995 film), a Canadian short film, in English and French, also known as Rideau

=== Literature ===
- Curtain (novel), by Agatha Christie, 1975
- The Curtain (essay), by Milan Kundera, published 2005 as Le Rideau

=== Music ===
- Cortina (tango), or curtain, short pieces of music between dances at a tango event
- The Curtains, an American music group
- Kurtains, Welsh singer-songwriter
- Curtains (John Frusciante album), 2005
- Curtains (Tindersticks album), 1997
- "Curtains" (song), a 2023 song by Ed Sheeran
- "Curtains", a 2000 song by Red Flag
- "Curtains", a song by Elton John from the 1975 album Captain Fantastic and the Brown Dirt Cowboy
- "Curtains", a song by Marvelous 3 from the 2023 album IV
- "Curtains", B-side of "Big Time" (Peter Gabriel song), 1986

=== Theatre equipment ===
- Front curtain
- Safety curtain
- Theater drapes and stage curtains

=== Theatres ===
- Curtain Theatre, a former Elizabethan playhouse in London
- Curtain Theatre (Glasgow), a Scottish theatre company in the 1930s

=== Other uses in arts and entertainment ===
- Curtains (musical), a musical mystery comedy first produced in 2006
- "Curtains" (Under the Dome), episode of TV drama

== People ==
- Elizabeth Curtain, former Australian judge
- Peter Curtain (born 1962), former Australian rules footballer
- Ruth F. Curtain (1941–2018), Australian mathematician

== Other uses ==
- Curtain array antenna
- Curtained hair or curtains, a hairstyle featuring a long fringe
- Shutter curtains, a form of shutter (photography)

== See also ==
- Air curtain (disambiguation)
- Curtain call (disambiguation)
- Curtain wall (disambiguation)
- Curtin (disambiguation)
- Iron Curtain (disambiguation)
- Kerton
- Kurten
- McCurtain (disambiguation)
- Rideau (disambiguation) (French, 'curtain')
- Curtain coating, a process that creates a curtain of fluid that falls onto a substrate
- Flowstone, curtain-like mineral deposits in caves
