= Irumbu Thirai =

Irumbu Thirai (transl. Iron Curtain) may refer to:

- Irumbu Thirai (1960 film), an Indian Tamil-language film
- Irumbu Thirai (2018 film), an Indian Tamil-language film

== See also ==
- Iron Curtain (disambiguation)
