= Torben Liebrecht =

German actor (born 1977)

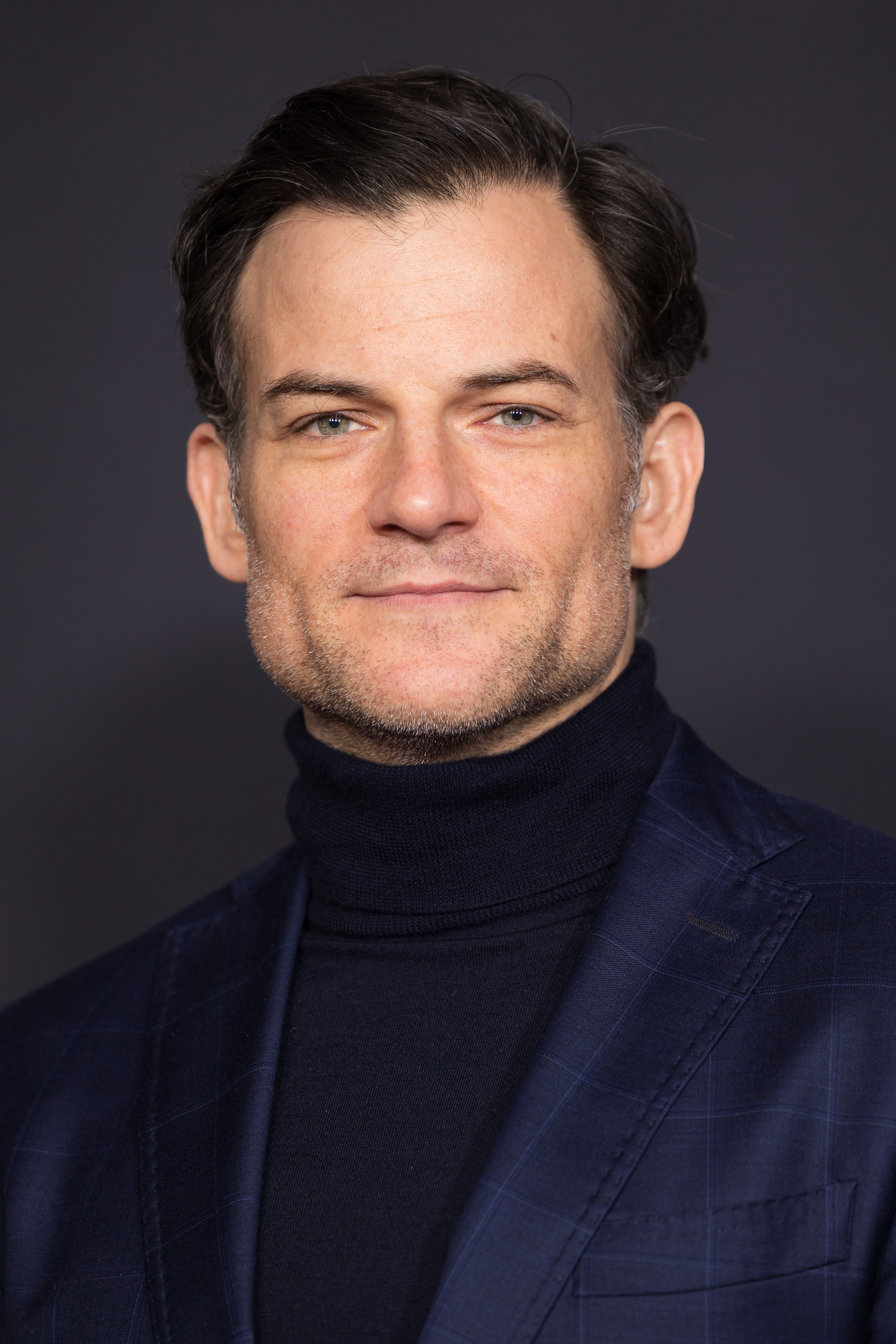
- Born: 3 December 1977 (age 48); Reinbek, Schleswig-Holstein, West Germany
- Citizenship: German
- Occupation: Actor
- Years active: 1996–present
- Website: www.torben-liebrecht.de

Torben Liebrecht (German: [ˈtɔʁbn̩ ˈliːbʁɛçt]; born 3 December 1977) is a German actor and voice actor.

== Career ==
Liebrecht starting his acting career as Heiner in Doppelter Einsatz. His first large role came as Karl von Sassnitz in Die Schule am See. He also played Alois in the ITV television drama Monsignor Renard. Among other minor roles, Liebrecht then played Friedrich in the 2002 horror film Deathwatch. The year after, he played Charles V, Holy Roman Emperor in the film Luther, and starred in a minor role in Kevin Spacey's film, Beyond the Sea. In 2005, he played the role of Bernd Steher, a copy shop/pub employee, in the film Rose, and in 2006, plays the role of Marco, a German paparazzo, in the film Eine Krone für Isabell. Next, he played the role of Anton in the German show Verrückt nach Clara, and then as Matz in the crime thriller show Die Patin – Kein Weg zurück. Afterwards he played the lead role of Eddie in Mein Flaschengeist und ich, and then was cast Hannes Wenisch in Das Wunder von Merching. He then played Lennard in the film The King's Surrender. He was then cast as Franz Faber in the Canadian television series X Company, in which he won a Canadian Screen Award for best performance by an actor in a featured supporting role in a dramatic program or series. He also starred as Rolf "The Wolf" Dannenberg in the German miniseries Morgen hör ich auf, and is set to star as Rudolf Dassler in the German biodrama film Adidas vs. Puma: The Brother's Feud.

Liebrecht studied film directing at University of Television and Film Munich, and is currently living in Munich.

In February 2019, it was announced that Liebrecht was cast in the main role of Colonel Ivan Carrera for the second season of Netflix's science-fiction series, Altered Carbon.
