= Curtain call (disambiguation) =

A curtain call is a return of individuals to the stage to be recognized by the audience for their performance.

Curtain call may also refer to:

== Film ==
- Curtain Call (1940 film), an American film comedy
- Curtain Call (1998 film), a film by Peter Yates
- Curtain Call (2000 film), a documentary film

== Music ==
- Curtain Call (Hank Mobley album), 1957
- Curtain Call: The Hits, a 2005 greatest hits album by Eminem
- Curtain Call 2, a 2022 greatest hits album by Eminem
- Curtain Call (UK album), a 2015 live album by UK
- "Curtain Call" (Nina Sky song), 2008
- "Curtain Call" (Aiden Grimshaw song), 2012
- "Curtain Call" (The Damned song), 1980
- "Curtain Call", a song by Ayumi Hamasaki on Next Level, 2009
- "Curtain Call", a song by Yuuri, 2024
- "Curtain Call" (Kis-My-Ft2 song), 2025

== Television ==
- Curtain Call (Australian TV series), a 1960s Australian TV series
- Curtain Call (American TV series), a 1952 American TV series
- "Curtain Call" (American Horror Story), a 2015 American Horror Story episode
- a The A-Team episode
- Curtain Call (South Korean TV series), a 2022 South Korean TV series
- An event involving a group of professional wrestlers known as The Kliq, often referred to as "Curtain Call"
- "Curtain Call" (Hazbin Hotel), an episode of the second season of Hazbin Hotel

== Other ==
- Theatrhythm Final Fantasy: Curtain Call, a rhythm video game

== See also ==
- Curtain (disambiguation)
