= Iron Wall =

Iron Wall may refer to:

- Iron Wall (essay), by Ze'ev Jabotinsky, 1923
- Iron Wall (film), a 2006 Palestinian documentary about Israeli settlements in the West Bank
- The Iron Wall: Zionist Revisionism from Jabotinsky to Shamir, a 1984 book by Lenni Brenner
- Iron Wall (Israeli military operation)
- Gaza–Israel barrier, also known as "Iron wall"
- K-W Line, a World War 2 defence line in Belgium which has been characterized as an iron wall

== See also ==
- Iron Curtain (disambiguation)
