= Bill Mustos =

Canadian television executive and lawyer

Bill Mustos is a Canadian television executive and lawyer. He is the founder, president and executive producer through Avamar Entertainment of Flashpoint. Mustos' has been involved in the Canadian film and television industry for decades.
