= Iron Curtain (disambiguation) =

The Iron Curtain was the boundary dividing Europe in the Cold War.

Iron Curtain may also refer to:

- Safety curtain, in theatres
- Iron Curtain (countermeasure), an active protection system
- Iron Curtain (football), the defensive line of Rangers Football Club in the 1940s and 1950s
- Iron Curtain (musical), a comedy musical about the Soviet Union
- The Iron Curtain (film), a 1948 film
- The Iron Curtain device, a fictional superweapon in the Red Alert series
- Irumbu Thirai (1960 film) (Tamil for Iron Curtain), a 1960 film
- Iron Curtain: The Crushing of Eastern Europe, a book by Anne Applebaum

== See also ==
- Iron Wall (disambiguation)
- Curtain (disambiguation)
- Steel Curtain, a phrase used to describe the NFL's Pittsburgh Steelers' defense during the 1970s
- Bamboo Curtain, Cold War expression
- Behind the Iron Curtain (disambiguation)
- EV13 The Iron Curtain Trail, cycling route along the Iron Curtain
- Irumbu Thirai (disambiguation) (lit. 'Iron Curtain'), various Indian film titles
