= Gunahon Ka Devta (TV series) =

Indian television series

- Created by: Shanti Bhushan; Imagine Creative Team
- Written by: Kamal Pandey; Amit Jha
- Directed by: Hemant Prabhu; Inder Das; Ismail Umar Khan
- Creative director: Neelima bajpayi
- Starring: See below
- Country of origin: India
- Original language: Hindi
- No. of episodes: 182

Production
- Producers: Neelima Bajpai; Shyamasish Bhattacharya
- Running time: 24 minutes
- Production company: Shakuntalam Telefilms

Original release
- Network: Imagine TV
- Release: 20 September 2010 – 27 May 2011

Gunahon Ka Devta (transl. Lord of Sins) is an Indian television series which aired from September 2010 to May 2011 on Imagine TV. It was produced by Shyamasis Bhattacharya of Shakuntalam Telefilms. The story was set against the violent background of eastern Uttar Pradesh.

== Plot ==
The story is set in the town of Chillupar in eastern Uttar Pradesh where a new incident of crime occurs every day and gun violence is common.

Avdesh Singh Thakur a.k.a. "Bhaiyyaji" is one of the most feared people in Lallanpur but is also widely respected for his generosity and sense of justice. Among his admirers is Arpita Rai, the daughter of corrupt civil engineer Mahesh Rai. While she fears her father and brothers at home, Arpita is a carefree fun-loving college student outside home. She despises her father's corrupt practices and idolises Avdhesh who is the Robin Hood of Lallanpur.

The show follows the unlikely love story of Avdhesh and Arpita set against the devastating background of violence.

Mahesh Rai arranges Arpita's wedding with Pappu. Arpita writes a letter to Avdesh confessing her love for him. Avdesh comes to the rescue and fills Arpita's maang and takes her with him. At home Bahuji is not happy with this, as Bahuji secretly loves Avdesh. To Bahuji's dismay, Avdesh and Arpita get married. As Avdesh and Arpita are about to consummate their marriage Bahuji interrupts with making Avdesh realize that he has to avenge death of his father and his older brother whom were killed by Laal Singh. Avdesh swears that he will not go close to Arpita until he kills Laal Singh. Arpita tries every possible way to keep Avdesh away from violence but Bahuji does not let this happen.

Eventually Avdesh gets very close to killing Laal Singh but Bahuji helps Laal Singh flee as she does not want Avdesh to go close to Arpita. Enter Ranvijay Singh a cop. Ranvijay warns Avdesh to surrender or he will have to face harder consequences which scares Arpita as she does not want to lose Avdesh. Avdesh finds out that Arpita had gone to plead Ranvijay to not harm Avdesh. This angers Avdesh even more. Circumstances lead to Avdesh and Arpita hide from the police in the jungle. And Arpita shoots Ranvijay as he is about to kill Avdesh. Ranvijay survives and tells the police that someone else shot him. Days later at Arpita's brothers wedding, Ranvijay comes and arrests Arpita. And brutally beats Arpita in front of Avdesh. Avdesh frees Arpita in prison. Avdesh and Arpita spend some time together. At home Avdesh's sister Shikha returns and Bahuji finds out that Shikha is pregnant with Tanmay's (Ranvijay's brother) child. Just as Avdesh and Arpita are getting closer, Bahuji reveals to the couple that Shikha is pregnant out of wedlock angers Avdesh. Avdesh agrees to get Shikha and Tanmay married. Ran Vijay pretends to have changed. Ran Vijay calls Arpita and threatens her saying if she wants the Shikha and Tanmay married she will have to sleep him without Avdesh knowing. Arpita agrees although nothing happens between Ranvijay and Arpita. Arpita thinks she has cheated Avdesh and decides to commit suicide by jumping from the rooftop. Arpita jumps and is injured, Ranvijay tell her nothing has happened between. Arpita now tries to come close to Avdesh but Bahuji tells Avdesh that Arpita is having an affair with Ranvijay which Avdesh believes. On their anniversary Avdesh misbehaves with Arpita asking why she has done such a thing to him Arpita begs Avdesh to trust her but he leaves drunk. Arpita is about to fall off and Nahuji comes and pushes her down which Arpita falls off and dies. Avdesh learns of Arpita's death two days later. With the help of Shikha and Simple Avdesh finds out that Ranvijay had been conspiring against the couple. Avdesh kills Ranvijay.

Pihu a lookalike of Arpita enters their lives. Avdesh finds out about Pihu and believes she is Arpita. Pihu hates and rejects Avdesh. Circumstances lead Pihu to come to Avdesh's Haveli in order to find the whereabouts of her fiancé. Pihu finds Avdesh is innocent and all the karta dharta is bahuji's. Bahuji threatens to kills Pihu, but ends up killing Avdesh's mom. Pihu reveals to Avdesh that she is not Arpita, as Bahuji killed Arpita long ago. Avdesh confronts Bahuji and bahuji confesses her love to Avdesh, Avdesh disgusted by that since he sees Bahuji like his mother. Arpita's spirit appears and Avdesh asks her to stay with him, but unfortunately she cannot stay with so he decides to go where she is. Avdesh jumps off and dies at the same roof top where Arpita died. They reunite in heaven while hum hai is pal haha playing in the background.

== Cast ==
- Ashish Sharma as Avdhesh Singh Thakur: Arpita's husband
- Tanvi Bhatia as Arpita Rai: Avdhesh's wife
- Sanjay Swaraj as Mahesh Rai: Arpita's father
- Raja Bherwani, Arpita's brother
- Shardul Pandit as Pavan: Pihu’s brother
- Vineet Kumar Chaudhary as Inspector Ranvijay Singh
- Nivedita Bhattacharya as Bhauji: Avdhesh's sister-in-law
- Anuj Sharma as Amjad: Avdhesh's friend
- Falaq Naaz as Shikha: Avdhesh's sister
- Sahil Anand as Tanmay Singh: Shikha's husband

== Production ==
Before premiere, as a part of campaign across 15 cities, chilli powder packets to women in colleges.

== Reception ==
Hindustan Times stated, "On the sunnyside, the lingo, the body language and even the style of dressing is close to real. Baring a few, all the actors have performed well, especially Ashish Sharma who makes Avdhesh Singh believable. On the flipside, the story after a point becomes quite predic
