= Curtin =

Curtin may refer to:

== Places ==
=== Australia ===
- Curtin, Australian Capital Territory, a suburb
- RAAF Base Curtin, a military air base near Derby, Western Australia
- Division of Curtin, an Australian electoral division in Western Australia

=== United States ===
- Curtin, Oregon, an unincorporated community
- Curtin Township, Centre County, Pennsylvania, a township
- Curtin, Nicholas County, West Virginia, an unincorporated community
- Curtin, Webster County, West Virginia, an unincorporated community

== Other uses ==
- Curtin (surname), a surname common in Ireland
- Curtin (2007 film), about Australian Prime Minister John Curtin
- Curtin FM, a radio station based in Perth, Western Australia
- Curtin University, in Western Australia
  - Curtin College

== See also ==
- Curtain (disambiguation)
