= Behind the Iron Curtain =

Behind the Iron Curtain refers to being east of the Cold War European boundary known as the Iron Curtain.

Behind the Iron Curtain could also refer to:

- Behind the Iron Curtain (video), a video by Iron Maiden
- Behind the Iron Curtain (album), a live album by Nico

== See also ==
- Iron Curtain (disambiguation)
