= Air curtain =

Air curtain may refer to:

- Air door, a fan-powered device used for separating two spaces from each other
- Pneumatic barrier for containing oil spills
- Air curtain (automotive), a type of aerodynamic vent in the body of a vehicle

== See also ==
- Curtain (disambiguation)
