= Remembrance (2001 film) =

- Directed by: Stephanie Morgenstern
- Written by: Stephanie Morgenstern; Mark Ellis
- Produced by: Paula Fleck
- Starring: Mark Ellis; Stephanie Morgenstern
- Cinematography: Mark Morgenstern
- Edited by: Vesna Svilanovic
- Release date: 2001
- Running time: 19 minutes
- Country: Canada
- Language: English

Remembrance is a 2001 Canadian short film, directed by Stephanie Morgenstern. It was nominated for a Genie Award for Best Live Action Short Film at the 23rd Genie Awards, and won the Jutra Award for Best Short Film at the 4th Jutra Awards. The film set the basis for the TV series X Company Morgenstern and Ellis later created in 2015.

== Plot ==
Remembrance is an unusual wartime romance, inspired by two true but little-known stories: a man with an extremely rare memory condition, synesthesia, which literally prevented him from forgetting; and Camp X – a top secret training facility near Whitby, Ontario, that was used to train Canadian and Allied spies during World War Two. Against this backdrop, two strangers meet and, each for their own reasons, must struggle against an unexpected and dangerous attraction.

== Cast ==
- Mark Ellis as Alfred
- Stephanie Morgenstern as Aurora
