= Curtain wall =

Curtain wall may refer to:

- Curtain wall (architecture), the outer skin of a modern building, often used in commercial or high-rise buildings, which may include glass, aluminum, or composite panels.
- Curtain wall (fortification), the outer wall of a castle or defensive structure, typically located between two bastions.
