= Rideau (company) =

Rideau Recognition
- Company type: Private
- Industry: Human resources outsourcing
- Founded: 1912; 114 years ago
- Headquarters: Montreal and New York
- Services: Corporate recognition solutions
- Website: www.Rideau.com

Rideau (/ˈriːdoʊ/ REE-doh; French pronunciation: [ʁido]) Recognition is a private, North American based company that provides corporate and governmental recognition programs and products. Founded in 1912 as the Stephenson Company, the company has undergone several buyouts and ventures in different geographical markets. Rideau was the first Canadian company to produce the Order of Canada, the country's highest civilian decoration, as well as the first Canadian company to be granted its own coat of arms by The Heraldic Authority.

== History ==
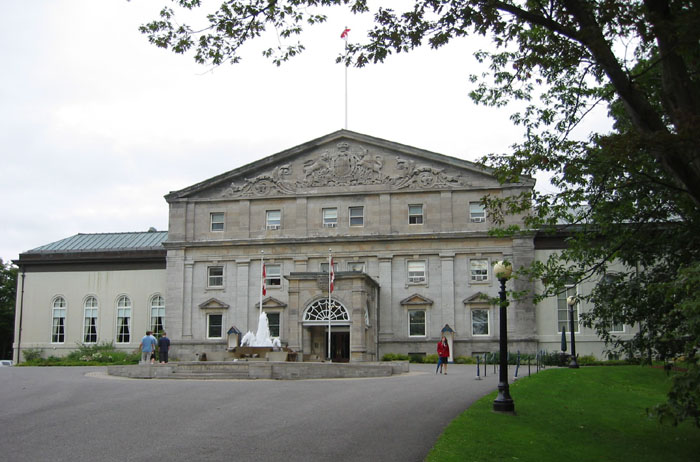
Rideau Hall, the company's namesake

=== Growth and Transition ===
In 1912 the Stephenson Company, situated on Saint-Maurice Street in old Montreal, began as a producer of emblematic jewelry for associations such as the Masons, the Knights of Columbus, and other organizations. During World Wars I and II, the company produced military insignia for the armed forces. However, in the mid-1950s, the company's shares were sold to a U.S.-based company that moved Stephenson Company's headquarters to Montreal North. The company was later sold back to two Montrealers who had numerous business interests, but nevertheless, Stephenson went into a steady state of decline.

By 1968, The Stephenson Company was almost bankrupt and was reduced to a staff of five. In that same year, Stephenson was purchased by Ed and Phyllis Hart. Its largest customer was Avon Cosmetics, which used the company's awards to help incentivize its sales force. In the 1970s, Avon began selling Stephenson's jewelry door-to-door along with its traditional cosmetics, which proved successful and helped both Avon and Stephenson flourish. In 1974, the Harts partnered with Maurice Bradden of D’Orlan Jeweler's, helping to launch its manufacturing capabilities on the European continent in the Republic of Ireland. The facility produced Nina Ricci fashion jewelry in the European Common Market. In 1978, the Harts sold the operation to their four children and family friend and continued to expand in Europe. In 1979, The Stephenson company opened a subsidiary, The Jeweller's Guild, in the United Kingdom. The Jeweler's Guild sold fashion jewelry exclusively by mail order. In 1980 other subsidiaries were set up in France, Holland and Germany, and they too sold fashion jewelry by mail order. Stephenson and its subsidiary companies did well until 1982, when the company's over-expansion coupled with the economic recession forced the company to change and reinvent itself. In 1983, the newly restructured Stephenson Company started producing the Order of Canada, the country's highest civilian decoration. Up until The Stephenson company was granted permission to produce the award, it had been produced solely in England by crown jeweler Garrards of London.

At the suggestion of Bruce Beatty, the chief designer of the Canadian Honours System, the owners renamed the company Rideau to reflect their service to the Governor General of Canada, who resides in Rideau Hall in Ottawa.

In 1989, Rideau shifted its focus from government decorations and medals to their current focus of corporate recognition and point-based recognition solutions. In 2006, Rideau acquired Recognition Management Institute (RMI) a company whose focus was helping businesses grow by building relationships with their employees and customers. Rideau made an investment in analytic data (big data) research in 2008 and proved the link between employee recognition and company's Key Performance Indicators (KPIs). In that same year, RMI became "Vistance Learning". By 2012, the implementation of Vistance Analytics made Rideau the first data-driven recognition company. In 2015, Vistance was fully deployed within a major global financial services company.

=== Business under the Rideau name ===
Towards the end of the 1980s promotional products and fashion jewelry were increasingly being off-shored to the Far East, so the company began focusing on corporate recognition programs. It began providing fully outsourced recognition programs to RBC, Scotiabank, BMO, Molson, Alcan, Canadian Pacific, and the Government of Canada. In 1991, Rideau Recognition became the first Canadian company to be granted its own coat of arms by The Heraldic Authority, bearing the Latin motto Opus excellentiae ("Impressions of excellence").

Rideau Recognition is also a sponsor of Recognition Professionals International.

=== Acquisitions and Alliances ===
In April 2006, Rideau Recognition announced their acquisition of Recognition Management Institute (RMI), a London, Ontario-based consulting organization specializing in training managers how to recognize and retain top employers.

In August 2015, Rideau Recognition executed a definitive asset purchase agreement with Birks Group, Inc. whereby Birks Group sold its corporate sales division, also known as "Birks Business" to Rideau for CAD $5.625 million (approximately US$4.3 million.

On August 1, 2017, Rideau acquired Pressed Metal Products, a Vancouver-based company that manufactures emblematic insignia jewelry, awards and medals.

=== Rebranding ===
In March 2017, Rideau Recognition underwent a rebranding which included a new logo, website, corporate signature and colors and a new Vistance platform and proprietary score called Recognition Quotient (RQ).

=== Vistance ===
Vistance Analytics & Prescriptive Learning is a division of Rideau. Vistance Analytics analyzes the impact of recognition programs and employee perceptions on an organization's Key Performance Indicators (KPIs). Vistance Learning is a prescriptive online assessment and learning management system to help leaders improve their organization's Key Performance Indicators (KPI) through critical development, employee recognition and engagement skills.

The initial concept for Vistance was created in 2007 from a think tank of organizational psychologists and recognition experts hired by Rideau Recognition Solutions to determine whether employee recognition has a measurable impact on business outcomes.

=== Environmental Awareness ===
Rideau Recognition is the first recognition firm to be certified as Carbon Neutral. The firm has been a participant and stakeholder to the United Nations Global Compact (UNCG) since 2005. Rideau has helped plant over 100,000 native trees and was the recipient of the Eterne Award in 2015. This award is given to companies who support Tree Canada and exemplify the best in environmental stewardship.
