= Flashpoint (TV series) =

2008 Canadian police procedural television series

- Genre: Police procedural
- Created by: Mark Ellis; Stephanie Morgenstern
- Directed by: David Frazee; Stephen Surjik; Holly Dale; Érik Canuel
- Starring: Hugh Dillon; Amy Jo Johnson; David Paetkau; Enrico Colantoni; Sergio Di Zio; Michael Cram; Mark Taylor; Jessica Steen; Ruth Marshall; Oluniké Adeliyi; Clé Bennett
- Theme music composer: Amin Bhatia; Ari Posner
- Opening theme: Theme from Flashpoint
- Country of origin: Canada
- Original language: English
- No. of seasons: 5
- No. of episodes: 75 (list of episodes)

Production
- Executive producers: Anne Marie La Traverse; Bill Mustos
- Producer: Tracey Boulton
- Production locations: Toronto, Ontario, Canada
- Cinematography: David Perrault; Stephen Reizes
- Running time: 44 minutes
- Production companies: Pink Sky Entertainment; Avamar Entertainment; CTV (2008–2011); Bell Media (2011–2012); CBS Paramount Television (2008–2009); CBS Television Studios (2009–2011); CBS Television Distribution (2012); Ion Television (2012)

Original release
- Network: CTV (Canada, 2008–2012); CBS (US, 2008–2011); Ion Television (US, 2011–2013)
- Release: July 11, 2008 – December 13, 2012

Flashpoint is a Canadian police procedural television series created by Mark Ellis and Stephanie Morgenstern and starring Hugh Dillon, Amy Jo Johnson, David Paetkau, Sergio Di Zio, and Enrico Colantoni. It follows the members of a fictional police tactical unit facing elevated threats and extreme situations beyond regular police work. The series premiered on CTV in Canada on July 11, 2008. In the United States, the first three seasons and the first part of the fourth were aired on CBS from July 11, 2008, until August 19, 2011. The show then aired on Ion Television starting on October 18, 2011, with the eighth episode of the fourth season. The series was distributed worldwide by Alchemy Television and Tele München Group.

On January 25, 2011, it was announced that Ion Television had acquired all rights to the show held by CBS, including the option to continue production. On May 1, 2012, the producers announced that the fifth season would be the last of the series. The series finale aired on December 13, 2012.

== Premise ==
Flashpoint follows Team One of the Metropolitan Police's Strategic Response Unit, a fictional police tactical unit in an unnamed North American metropolis (based on the Toronto Police Service's Emergency Task Force; the metropolis itself is strongly implied to be Toronto, Ontario).

== Cast ==
Original main cast members (L–R) Dillon, Johnson, Taylor, Colantoni, Di Zio, Hogan, and Cram. Hogan was replaced by David Paetkau, playing Sam Braddock (not pictured), after the first episode.

The majority of the main cast of Flashpoint are Canadian, including Enrico Colantoni, David Paetkau, Hugh Dillon, Sergio Di Zio, Michael Cram, Mark Taylor, and Ruth Marshall. Amy Jo Johnson is the only American. In an interview, the show's creators stated that they preferred to cast Canadians in Flashpoint, in part because of the sizeable Canadian talent pool, but also because American audiences are less likely to have preconceptions about the characters.

Johnson said she had no problems with the physical demands of the show despite being pregnant during initial production of the series.

== Episodes ==
Season	Episodes	Originally released	
Season	Episodes	First released	Last released
1	13	July 11, 2008	February 13, 2009
2	18	February 27, 2009	November 20, 2009
3	13	July 16, 2010	February 6, 2011
4	18	July 8, 2011	December 13, 2011
5	13	September 20, 2012	December 13, 2012

== Production ==
=== Development ===
Flashpoint was conceived in 2005 as part of a CTV project that encouraged actors to submit scripts to the network. The original Flashpoint script (known earlier as Sniper and Critical Incident) was for a two-hour television film. A pilot episode was produced for CTV in July 2007 under the Critical Incident title featuring most of the cast of what would become the series, but without the characters Jules Callaghan and Lewis Young; the characters in the pilot were Kate Travers and Robert "Shakes" Boneyman. CTV's interest in the project led to Flashpoint's being reworked as a regular CTV series, which was approved in mid-December 2007.

Although originally developed for a Canadian audience, it was announced on January 29, 2008, that American network CBS had purchased the rights to air the series in the United States, making it the second Canadian TV series aired in primetime on an American broadcast network after Due South, also a CTV show aired by CBS. In addition, Flashpoint is the first Canadian series aired by a major American broadcast network set entirely in Canada (as Due South was primarily set in Chicago but filmed in Toronto). On March 5, 2008, CBS announced that Flashpoint would premiere in July. CTV announced on May 8, 2008, that it would simulcast the show in Canada beginning on July 11.

Flashpoint began filming 13 episodes on April 17, 2008. It was written and created by Mark Ellis and Stephanie Morgenstern and executive produced by multiple Gemini Award-winner Anne Marie La Traverse for Pink Sky Entertainment and Bill Mustos for Avamar Entertainment, in association with the CTV Television Network and CBS Television Studios (formerly CBS Paramount Network Television). The pilot episode, titled "Scorpio", was based on an actual event that occurred in Toronto in 2004, in which a gun-wielding hostage-taker was shot and killed by an Emergency Task Force sniper. Ellis and Morgenstern wrote their teleplay for the episode after interviewing members of the ETF. The majority of the episode reused substantial portions of the unaired Critical Incident pilot together with new footage featuring Amy Jo Johnson and Mark Taylor (who were not in the pilot). Director David Frazee carefully shot the SRU as one unit to demonstrate their unity. Producer Anne Marie La Traverse said the show would take people to their "own personal flash point." David Paetkau, one of the show's regular cast members, said Flashpoint "tries to capture the human element involved in policing, and discusses how some officers end up with emotional baggage and suffer with mental illnesses like post traumatic stress disorder." Input and advice from various ETF personnel were used in making the series.

On August 25, 2008, CTV announced it had renewed the show for a second season of 13 episodes to begin production in Toronto in early 2009. Some months later, both CTV and CBS increased the renewal to 18 episodes. According to tvguide.com, CBS announced that Flashpoint would return January 9, 2009, at 9 pm for a midseason start. In the United States and Canada, the remaining four episodes that were originally produced for season 1 aired as a part of season 2. CTV in Canada originally considered these episodes as part of season 1; however, after the airing of the fourth episode (which was originally considered the final episode of season 1), CTV changed the labelling of these four episodes and, following CBS, began considering them part of season 2. CBS and CTV both ended season 2 on May 25, 2009, after airing only the first nine episodes produced. The second nine episodes, filmed from May to August 2009, were originally aired in Canada by CTV as season 3. CTV officially began to refer to the episodes as the second half of season 2 (and altered its Flashpoint website accordingly). These episodes began airing June 4, 2010, on CBS, where they are considered part of season 3.

Season 3 was commissioned by CTV and CBS in October 2009. The first episode of the season began filming on January 13, 2010. This gave CBS 22 original episodes to broadcast while CTV had 13. CBS completed broadcasting season 2 on July 30, 2010. season 3 premiered on July 16, 2010, on both CTV and CBS. After entering a hiatus in mid-September after the broadcast of seven episodes from season 3, CTV resumed airing the remaining episodes on January 4, 2011. CTV ordered production of season 4 of Flashpoint on June 3, 2010, before season 3 began to air. On January 21, 2011, it was announced that CBS would air 7 of the 18 episodes from season 4, as well as the remaining 6 episodes from season 3 not yet shown on CBS, during the summer of 2011. Due to the cancellation of CHAOS, the remaining episodes from season 3 of Flashpoint were shown on CBS starting May 6, 2011. The remaining 11 episodes from season 4 began airing on ION Television in October of that year.

Filming of season 4 took place between February 14 and September 15, 2011. On May 9, 2011, CTV announced that season 4 would begin airing on June 17, 2011, to be simulcast by CBS. On June 1, 2011, Bell Media announced that the network ordered a fifth season of Flashpoint, containing 18 new episodes, starting to air in Canada in September 2012. Filming of season 5 took place between February 9 and June 27, 2012. The show producers later revealed that the order had been shortened to 13 episodes. On May 1, 2012, the producers announced on their Facebook page that they had decided season 5 would be their last. CTV confirmed the reduction in the episode order and the ending of the show on May 1. The two-part series finale aired on December 13, 2012.

=== Setting ===
Flashpoint is set in Toronto, Ontario, Canada. For much of the series' run, the setting was largely left vague. According to Enrico Colantoni, the setting was officially left unidentified. Bill Mustos, founder of co-production company Avamar Entertainment, stated this was intentional, commenting, "you're not going to see a show that is screaming 'Canada'. It's a show in a big sophisticated urban city where crises take place. The stories we're trying to tell are universal stories." CTV's press release regarding the series identified the setting as Toronto.

=== Music ===
The show's 30-second theme was written by Amin Bhatia and Ari Posner. The music of Hugh Dillon, Matthew Good, Amy Jo Johnson and Kim Taylor have also been used in the show's soundtrack. Johnson's song "Dancing In-between" was used in the ending of episode six of the first season, "Attention Shoppers" with Dillon's "Lost at Sea" used to conclude the eighth episode, "Never Kissed a Girl". The song "Open Your Eyes" by Tracenine was featured in the episode "Perfect Storm". Songs from Hugh Dillon can also be heard in season 2 episode 12 "Just a Man" (song "Don't Be Fooled") and the episode that concluded season 3 episode 13, "Fault Lines" (song "My Mistakes"). "Goodbye," a song written and performed by Amy Jo Johnson, features in season 3 episode 10, "Terror."

== Reception ==
=== Ratings ===
==== Canada ====
Note that each Canadian television season starts with the Monday of the week that includes the first day of September.

Viewership and ratings per season of Flashpoint
Season	Timeslot (ET)	Episodes	First aired		Last aired		TV season	Avg. viewers (millions)
Season	Timeslot (ET)	Episodes	Date	Viewers (millions)	Date	Viewers (millions)	TV season	Avg. viewers (millions)
1	Friday 10:00 pm (1–2); Thursday 10:00 pm (3–9); Friday 10:00 pm (10–13)	13	July 11, 2008	1.110	February 13, 2009	1.292	2008–09	1.255
2	Friday 9:00 pm	18	February 27, 2009	1.339	November 20, 2009	1.589	2009	1.489
3	Friday 10:00 pm (1–7); Tuesday 10:00 pm (8–12); Sunday 10:00 pm (13)	13	July 16, 2010	1.334	February 6, 2011	1.317	2010–11	1.650
4	Friday 8:00 pm (1–7); Monday 8:00 pm (8); Tuesday 8:00 pm (9–18)	18	July 8, 2011	1.369	December 13, 2011	1.208	2011	1.510
5	Thursday 10:00 pm	13	September 20, 2012	1.412	December 13, 2012	2.077	2012	1.800

The pilot episode was watched on CTV by 1.11 million viewers, earning the No. 1 spot in its timeslot. Flashpoint drew in 1,216,000 viewers during the week of July 28, 2008. It gained a bit more audience when the show drew in 1,300,000 viewers. In ratings for the week of February 23, 2009, Flashpoint has been watched by 1,339,000 viewers. CTV announced that a new series of Flashpoint episodes would air in the fall of 2009 on Friday nights at 10:00 pm ET. These episodes would not be simulcast with CBS. After CBS delayed broadcasting the episodes from summer 2009 to mid-season 2010, CTV initially backed off its commitment to fall 2009. Eventually in late August, CTV announced that the new episodes would premiere in Canada on September 25, 2009. It marked the first time CTV broadcast new Flashpoint episodes out of simulcast with CBS in the United States. The last original Flashpoint episode for the Canadian fall 2009 season was broadcast on November 20, 2009. Two Flashpoint episodes from the first season—"Attention Shoppers" and "Who's George?"—were nominated as finalists in the 2009 WGC Screenwriting Awards.

==== United States ====
Season	Episodes	Timeslot (ET)	Original airing			Rank (viewers)	Viewers (in millions)	Network
Season	Episodes	Timeslot (ET)	Season premiere	Season finale	TV season	Rank (viewers)	Viewers (in millions)	Network
1	13	Friday 10:00 pm (July 11–18); Thursday 10:00 pm (July 25 – September 18); Friday 9:00 pm (January 9 – February 13)	July 11, 2008; January 9, 2009 (2nd half)	September 18, 2008 (1st half); February 13, 2009	2007–08	N/A	7.61	CBS
2	18	Friday 9:00 pm	February 27, 2009; June 4, 2010 (2nd half)	May 15, 2009 (1st half); July 9, 2010	2008–09	48	9.48	CBS
3	13	Friday 10:00 pm	July 16, 2010; May 6, 2011 (2nd half)	September 17, 2010 (1st half); June 17, 2011	2009–10	N/A	7.13	CBS
4	18	Friday 8:00 pm (July 8 – August 19); Tuesday 10:00 pm (October 18 – January 24)	July 8, 2011 (CBS); October 18, 2011 (ION)	August 19, 2011 (CBS); January 24, 2012 (ION)	2010–11	N/A	6.25	CBS/ION
5	13	Tuesday 11:00 pm	October 16, 2012	January 22, 2013	2012–13	TBA	TBA	ION

The Boston Globe praised Flashpoint for using emotion that "lingers on the psychic toll that such high-tension work can take." The pilot episode was watched on CBS by 8.23 million people, earning the No. 1 ranking for the hour. According to Flashpoint executive Bill Mustos in August 2008, the success of the show in the US was not due to the Writer's Guild strikes, but mainly because of the need of having a new kind of show on television. Flashpoint did well in its initial airings on Friday nights (in the time slot normally given to Numb3rs), building on the lead-in from that show, to the point that it drew more viewers on Friday nights than Swingtown, another new drama, did on the normally busier Thursday nights, which prompted CBS to move Flashpoint to Thursday nights in an attempt to further build its audience. On December 2, 2008, CBS announced that they would begin airing the second season of Flashpoint on January 9, 2009. A third season of Flashpoint was to have aired as a midseason replacement during CBS's 2009–2010 schedule; however, CBS announced it would air these episodes during the summer of 2009 beginning on July 17, 2009, instead of its previously announced 2010 timetable. On July 7, 2009, CBS rescinded its decision and the show aired midseason after all. These were the same episodes that CTV broadcast in Canada during the fall 2009 season. CBS began airing these episodes on June 4, 2010. The remainder of the third season was broadcast on CBS beginning May 6, 2011. On Metacritic, Flashpoint has a score of 51 out of 100, indicating "mixed or average reviews".

=== Accolades ===
Year	Award	Category	Recipient	Result	Ref.
2009	ACTRA Awards	Outstanding Performance – Female	Sarah Gadon	Nominated	
2009	Gemini Awards	Best Direction in a Dramatic Series	Kelly Makin	Won	
2009	Gemini Awards	Best Dramatic Series	Flashpoint	Won	
2009	Gemini Awards	Best Performance by an Actor in a Continuing Leading Dramatic Role	Enrico Colantoni	Won	
2009	Gemini Awards	Best Performance by an Actor in a Continuing Leading Dramatic Role	Hugh Dillon	Nominated	
2009	Gemini Awards	Best Performance by an Actress in a Continuing Leading Dramatic Role	Amy Jo Johnson	Nominated	
2009	Gemini Awards	Best Performance by an Actor in a Guest Role, Dramatic Series	Nicholas Campbell	Nominated	
2009	Gemini Awards	Best Performance by an Actor in a Guest Role, Dramatic Series	Henry Czerny	Won	
2009	Gemini Awards	Best Performance by an Actor in a Guest Role, Dramatic Series	Mpho Koaho	Nominated	
2009	Gemini Awards	Best Performance by an Actor in a Guest Role, Dramatic Series	Ron Lea	Nominated	
2009	Gemini Awards	Best Performance by an Actress in a Guest Role, Dramatic Series	Tatiana Maslany	Won	
2009	Gemini Awards	Best Writing in a Dramatic Series	Mark Ellis, Stephanie Morgenstern	Nominated	
2010	Gemini Awards	Best Direction in a Dramatic Series	David Frazee	Won	
2010	Gemini Awards	Best Direction in a Dramatic Series	Stephen Surjik	Nominated	
2010	Gemini Awards	Best Dramatic Series	Flashpoint	Nominated	
2010	Gemini Awards	Best Performance by an Actor in a Featured Supporting Role in a Dramatic Series	Sergio Di Zio	Nominated	
2010	Gemini Awards	Best Performance by an Actor in a Featured Supporting Role in a Dramatic Series	Mark Taylor	Nominated	
2010	Gemini Awards	Best Performance by an Actress in a Featured Supporting Role in a Dramatic Series	Jessica Steen	Nominated	
2010	Gemini Awards	Best Performance by an Actor in a Guest Role, Dramatic Series	Michael Riley	Won	
2010	Gemini Awards	Best Performance by an Actor in a Guest Role, Dramatic Series	Hugh Thompson	Nominated	
2010	Gemini Awards	Best Performance by an Actress in a Guest Role, Dramatic Series	Ona Grauer	Nominated	
2010	Gemini Awards	Best Performance by an Actress in a Guest Role, Dramatic Series	Laurence Leboeuf	Nominated	
2010	Gemini Awards	Best Writing in a Dramatic Series	Ian Weir	Won	
2011	Gemini Awards	Best Dramatic Series	Flashpoint	Nominated	
2011	Gemini Awards	Best Direction in a Dramatic Series	David Frazee	Nominated	
2011	Gemini Awards	Best Writing in a Dramatic Series	Mark Ellis, Stephanie Morgenstern	Won	
2011	Gemini Awards	Best Performance by an Actor in a Continuing Leading Dramatic Role	Enrico Colantoni	Nominated	
2011	Gemini Awards	Best Performance by an Actor in a Featured Supporting Role in a Dramatic Series	Sergio Di Zio	Won	
2011	Gemini Awards	Best Performance by an Actor in a Guest Role, Dramatic Series	Colin Cunningham	Nominated	
2011	Gemini Awards	Best Performance by an Actor in a Guest Role, Dramatic Series	Tim Rozon	Won	
2011	Gemini Awards	Best Performance by an Actor in a Guest Role, Dramatic Series	Jonathan Scarfe	Nominated	
2011	Gemini Awards	Best Performance by an Actress in a Guest Role, Dramatic Series	Liisa Repo-Martell	Nominated	
2011	Gemini Awards	Best Performance by an Actress in a Guest Role, Dramatic Series	Kristen Thomson	Nominated	
2012	WGC Canadian Screenwriting Awards	Best Television Drama	Larry Bambrick	Won	
2013	Canadian Screen Awards	Best Direction in a Dramatic Series	Jim Donovan	Won	
2013	Canadian Screen Awards	Best Dramatic Series	Flashpoint	Won	
2013	Canadian Screen Awards	Best Performance by an Actor in a Continuing Leading Dramatic Role	Enrico Colantoni	Won	
2013	Canadian Screen Awards	Best Performance by an Actor in a Featured Supporting Role in a Dramatic Program or Series	Michael Cram	Nominated	
2013	Canadian Screen Awards	Best Performance by an Actor in a Featured Supporting Role in a Dramatic Program or Series	Sergio Di Zio	Nominated	
2013	Canadian Screen Awards	Best Writing in a Dramatic Series	Aubrey Nealon	Won	
2014	Canadian Screen Awards	Best Dramatic Series	Flashpoint	Nominated	
2014	Canadian Screen Awards	Best Performance by an Actor in a Continuing Leading Dramatic Role	Hugh Dillon	Won	
2014	Canadian Screen Awards	Best Performance by an Actor in a Featured Supporting Role in a Dramatic Program or Series	Sergio Di Zio	Nominated	

== Home media and streaming ==
In DVD region 1, Phase 4 Films has released all five seasons on DVD in Canada, while in the United States, CBS DVD (distributed by Paramount Home Entertainment) has released the first four seasons. The final season was released in the United States on March 18, 2014. Phase 4 Films released Flashpoint: The Complete Series on DVD in Canada on November 5, 2013. The 19-disc set features all 75 episodes of the series as well as bonus features. In Region 2, the complete first season was released on DVD in the UK on April 13, 2009 by ITV DVD. In France, the first three seasons were released on DVD by Koba Films. In Region 3, STG Multimedia released the complete first season on DVD in Thailand on April 9, 2011. The complete second season was released on May 20, 2011. In Region 4, Hopscotch Entertainment has released the first three seasons on DVD in Australia.

Release name	Ep #	Region 1 (US)	Region 1 (Canada)	Region 2 (UK)	Region 4 (Australia)	DVD Special Features
Season One	13	October 13, 2009	October 13, 2009	August 25, 2010	April 16, 2009	Commentary: pilot episode; Behind the scenes; The Human Cost of Heroism; Note: Special features available in Region 1.
Season Two	18	November 19, 2010	May 25, 2010	N/A	March 4, 2010 (Part 1) April 15, 2010 (Part 2)	Stunts; Weapons; Photo gallery; Music video; Note: Special features available in Region 1.
Season Three	13	May 22, 2012	May 17, 2011	January 19, 2011	May 19, 2011	Set tour with Enrico Colantoni; Profile: Hugh Dillon; Behind the scenes; Note: Special features available in Region 1.
Season Four	18	October 16, 2012	May 15, 2012	December 14, 2012	August 1, 2018	The Music for Flashpoint; A day in the life on set of Flashpoint; Enrico Colantoni: Profile of Sgt. Greg Parker
Season Five	13	August 27, 2013	May 7, 2013	N/A	September 5, 2018	The Final Salute: Cast interview with Ben Mulroney
Flashpoint: The Complete Series		N/A	November 5, 2013	N/A	November 1, 2018 (as Flashpoint Complete Collection)	

== International distribution ==
Flashpoint was distributed by Alchemy Television and Tele München Group to all international markets outside of North America. In July 2008, it was announced that the two distributors had sold the series to TV networks in 50 countries outside Canada and the United States, including New Zealand (TV2), the United Kingdom (ITV3 and Universal Channel), France, Austria (ORF), Germany, Switzerland, Italy (RAI), Spain, Finland, Iceland, Sweden, Norway, the Netherlands, Belgium, Croatia, Australia (Nine Network), and several countries in Latin America.

The series has been broadcast in Quebec on the Canadian French-language network V (formerly known as TQS) on March 9, 2009.

In December 2008, 9 out of 13 episodes produced during the series' first season had been aired in North America; however, all 13 episodes had been aired by New Zealand's TV2 as of December 10, 2008. The Australian premiere occurred on January 11, 2009, when Nine Network took the unusual step of airing the second episode in isolation ahead of the season. This followed a cricket telecast in a relatively late Sunday night timeslot. Starting with the third season, the series later premiered on 13th Street in Australia in 2011 to 2012; however, it was then moved over to Universal Channel after that.

Further foreign debuts of Flashpoint occurred well after the series had ended. In Latin America, the series debuted in Mexico in TV Azteca in 2012. In Thailand, the series aired on Channel 5 on February 25, 2016.

== See also ==
- S.W.A.T. (1975 TV series) – A similar series following an American SWAT team, also set in an unidentified city strongly based on its Los Angeles filming location
  - S.W.A.T. (2017 TV series) – A remake of the 1975 series, following a Los Angeles Police Department SWAT team
