= Rideau brothers =

American criminals

Joseph "Joe Joe" Rideau (September 30, 1979 - October 28, 2001) and Christopher "Chris" Rideau (April 5, 1981- July 10, 2011), were well known criminals from New Orleans, Louisiana. Authorities said the brothers terrorized the streets of New Orleans and built a reputation as brazen gangsters. For years the duo was implicated in a host of crimes, but they were rarely convicted because of reluctant witnesses and missing evidence that doomed cases. In 2001 the brother's crime sprees would come to an end after a violent standoff in which the elder brother Joseph was killed. The wild incident made national headlines in the media. Christopher was sentenced to 10 years in prison for his role in the incident and was released from prison in 2010 with time off for good behavior. In 2011, he was viciously gunned down in New Orleans.

== Overview ==
Raised in the Algiers neighborhood both brothers began a life of crime at an early age. Both where in and out of jail institutions for a number of serious crimes such as rape, murder and robbery. Before his death Joseph was wanted on a string of armed robberies on the West Bank that police say were motivated by his need to feed a serious Heroin addiction. In a Times Picayune article the brothers were described as "legends of the streets who somehow, always stayed at least one telephone tip ahead of the law." Joseph cemented his reputation in 1997 when, according to police, he leaped from a third-floor balcony to dodge an arrest warrant for murder. His only conviction came in August 1997 when he pleaded guilty to simple robbery. He was sentenced to probation, but later served about one year in prison when his probation was revoked. Christopher, younger and even more flamboyant, found himself painted with the same brush. Since the start of 2001, the younger Rideau has been jailed three times for unauthorized use of a car, possession of a firearm by a felon and armed robbery but none of the cases was accepted for prosecution by the district attorney's office. The robbery spree began in July, police said, when the Burger King was held up. A month later, Rideau was pegged for a robbery of the Taco Bell. Already a prime target on the police radar screen, Rideau reached a dangerous level of violence on October police said, when he and an acquaintance robbed a gas station on de Gaulle, then shot two women during a stickup at a nearby apartment complex. One woman survived a gunshot wound to the leg; the other, a shot to the head.

=== 2001 Standoff ===
In October 2001, NOPD began a 28-hour search for Joseph Rideau, for an outstanding warrant. Joseph was finally spotted in front of the DeGaulle Manor Apartments October 27 in a car and a chase ensued in which dozens of shots were fired from the rear of the car. During the chase, officers of the Crescent City Connection Police Department joined the pursuit, and shots were fired at them. The police were unable to stop the car as they were out gunned by high-powered assault rifles which helped them escape to a getaway vehicle. Later that day authorities tracked down the gateway car in front of a home in Algiers. Upon entering the home, while some officers provided a shield for the other officers, the shielded officers shot tear gas canisters into the residence. After the canisters were deployed, the officers heard the sound of shots from an AK-47 assault rifle. Officers pulled back into safer positions. Around daybreak, the brothers emerged from the residence. Whiteness stated Joseph was armed with an AK-47 assault rifle with a scope and a.75-round banana clip. The rifle was identified at the trial. Both brothers armed with rifles. Joseph shielded himself from the police with a female hostage. According to police, Joseph held the assault rifle to the women's head and ignored orders to surrender. After a 12-hour standoff Joseph was killed by a sniper. Christopher later surrendered and was arrested for attempted murder, carjacking, kidnapping and armed robbery.
