= Curtain Call (Australian TV series) =

Australian variety TV series

- Genre: Variety
- Country of origin: Australia
- Original language: English

Production
- Running time: 60 minutes

Original release
- Network: ATN-7
- Release: 1960

Curtain Call is an Australian variety series which aired in Sydney on ATN-7 during 1960, which featured comedy and music. It was followed-up in 1961 with the popular Revue '61.

The show aired in an hour-long time-slot (running time excluding commercials is not known). It was not live, but recorded in advance on video-tape, which at the time was cutting-edge technology (prior to video-tape, stations used the more primitive kinescope system)

English comedian Digby Wolfe appeared in several episodes. English comedian Billy Baxter also appeared as the host several episodes. Popular pianist Winifred Atwell appeared as a guest in an episode. Others to have appeared in the series included Red Moore, Kathy Lloyd, Barry Linehan, and Terry Scanlon.

== Reception ==
Sydney Morning Herald said of the series "the programs which I have seen have been uniformly good, funny, fresh and inventive".

== Episode status ==
The archival status of the show is not known, given the wiping of the era. An incomplete episode of the series, under the title The George Shearing Show, is held by the National Film and Sound Archive. According to a contemporary news article, this episode aired 1 October 1960.
