= Tanvi Bhatia =

Indian television actress

Tanvi Bhatia is an Indian television actress who started her career as a child artist and later went on to play a lead role in Gunahon Ka Devta.

== Television ==
- Mitwa Phool Kamal Ke as Bela
- Gunahon Ka Devta as Arpita Avdhesh Singh Thakur/Pihu Avdhesh Singh Thakur
- Kehta Hai Dil as Kiran(Few episodes)
- Dharamveer as Rajkumari Sia
