= David Frazee =

Canadian cinematographer and television director

David Frazee is a Canadian cinematographer and television director. He has earned numerous Gemini Award nominations. His work includes cinematography for Intelligence, Da Vinci's Inquest and Da Vinci's City Hall. He won a Gemini Award for Best Direction for the Flashpoint episode "One Wrong Move".

== Filmography ==
=== Film ===
Year	Title	Role	Notes
1988	Empire of Ash	Camera assistant / Camera operator: additional photography / Apprentice editor	
1989	Empire of Ash III	Camera operator	
1990	Flesh Gordon Meets the Cosmic Cheerleaders	Gaffer	
1991	Ultimate Desires	Camera operator: second unit	
1992	A Balancing Act	Cinematographer	
1992	East... West... Home's Base	Cinematographer	
1993	Time Runner	Additional photography	
1994	Boulevard	Cinematographer	
1994	Ski School 2	Director of photography: second unit	
1995	Traveler	Cinematographer	
1996	Downhill Willie	Second unit director	
1996	Starlight	Director of photography	
1997	True Prince: Vladimir Malakhov	Cinematographer	
1997	Wounded	Director of photography: second unit	
1997	Air Bud	Director of photography: second unit	
1998	Rupert's Land	Camera operator: "B" camera	
1998	Hell Mountain	Director of photography	
2000	Dangerous Attraction	Cinematographer	
2000	Tokyo Girls	Director of photography	
2001	Suddenly Naked	Cinematographer	
2001	Kevin of the North	Camera operator: Alaska	
2002	Edge of Madness	Cinematographer	
2002	Canadiana Blaze	Cinematographer	
2004	Toreador	Cinematographer	
2005	Chaos	Camera operator: "A" camera, second unit	
2006	Everything's Gone Green	Cinematographer / Director of Photography	
2006	Klatsassin	Cinematographer / Director of photography	
2006	Let It Ride	Cinematographer	

=== Television ===
Year	Title	Director	Notes
1997	The Spirit	Camera operator	TV movie
1998–2005	Da Vinci's Inquest	Director / Director of photography	81 episodes
2001	Stolen Chance	Cinematographer	TV movie
2002	100 Days in the Jungle	Cinematographer	TV movie
2003	Cowboys and Indians: The J.J. Harper Story	Cinematographer	TV movie
2004	The Life	Cinematographer	TV movie
2004	Crazy Canucks	Cinematographer	TV movie
2005	Behind the Camera: The Unauthorized Story of Mork and Mindy	Cinematographer	TV movie
2005	Ladies' Night	Cinematographer	TV movie
2005–2006	Da Vinci's City Hall	Director / Director of photography	10 episodes
2005–2007	Intelligence	Director / Director of photography	18 episodes
2006	A Girl Like Me: The Gwen Arajuo Story	Cinematographer	
2006	Behind the Camera: The Unauthorized Story of Diff'rent Strokes	Cinematographer	
2007	The Haunting of Sorority Row	Camera operator	TV movie
2008	The Quality of Life	Cinematographer	TV movie
2008–2012	Flashpoint	Director / Creative producer	28 episodes
2009	Living Out Loud	Cinematographer	TV movie
2010	Shattered	Director / Cinematographer	3 episodes
2011	Endgame	Director / Executive producer	14 episodes
2012	The Firm	Director	Episode: "Chapter Ten"
2012–2015	Continuum	Director	7 episodes
2013	Vikings	Director	2 episodes
2013	Borealis (Survival Code)	Director	2 episodes
2013	Rogue	Director	Episode: "Fireball"
2013–2016	Motive	Director	8 episodes
2013–2017	Orphan Black	Director	8 episodes
2013	Heartland	Director	2 episodes
2013	Republic of Doyle	Director	2 episodes
2014–2015	Remedy	Director	2 episodes
2014	Reign	Director	Episode: "Slaughter of Innonence"
2015	Ash vs Evil Dead	Director	2 episodes
2015–2016	The Romeo Section	Director / Executive producer	28 episodes
2016	Lucifer	Director	Episode: "A Priest Walks Into A Bar"
2016	Van Helsing	Director	2 episodes
2017	Incorporated	Director	Episode: "Burning Platform"
2017	Somewhere Between	Director	4 episodes
2017	Frontier	Director	2 episodes
2018	The Bletchley Circle: San Francisco	Director	2 episodes
2018	Titans	Director	Episode: "Donna Troy"
2019–2020	Vikings	Director	5 episodes
2020	October Faction	Director	2 episodes
2021	Snowpiercer	Director	2 episodes
2022	Motherland: Fort Salem	Director	2 episodes
2022	Vikings: Valhalla	Director	2 episodes
2022–2023	Billy the Kid	Director	4 episodes
2022–2024	Reginald the Vampire	Director	3 episodes
2024	Allegiance	Director	3 episodes
2025	Murder in a Small Town	Director	2 episodes

=== Actor ===
Year	Title	Role	Notes
2012	Rookie Blue	Ted The Coroner	Episode: "Girls' Night Out"
