= Mark Ellis (actor) =

Canadian actor and screenwriter

- Ellis at the 2009 Banff World TV Festival
- Occupations: Actor, screenwriter
- Spouse: Stephanie Morgenstern

Mark Ellis is a Canadian actor and screenwriter. He was the co-showrunner and executive producer of the CBC series X Company.

He also co-created and executive produced Flashpoint. The series was awarded the Academy Board of Directors Tribute for Outstanding and Enduring Contribution to Canadian Television, in addition to a Canadian Screen Award and Gemini Award for Best Dramatic Series. Ellis and his spouse Stephanie Morgenstern have received Gemini and Writers Guild awards for their writing in the series.

He has appeared in television, film and theatre, including the Emmy Award-winning Dark Oracle. He co-wrote and starred in the Genie-nominated short film Remembrance.
