= Stephanie Morgenstern =

Canadian actress

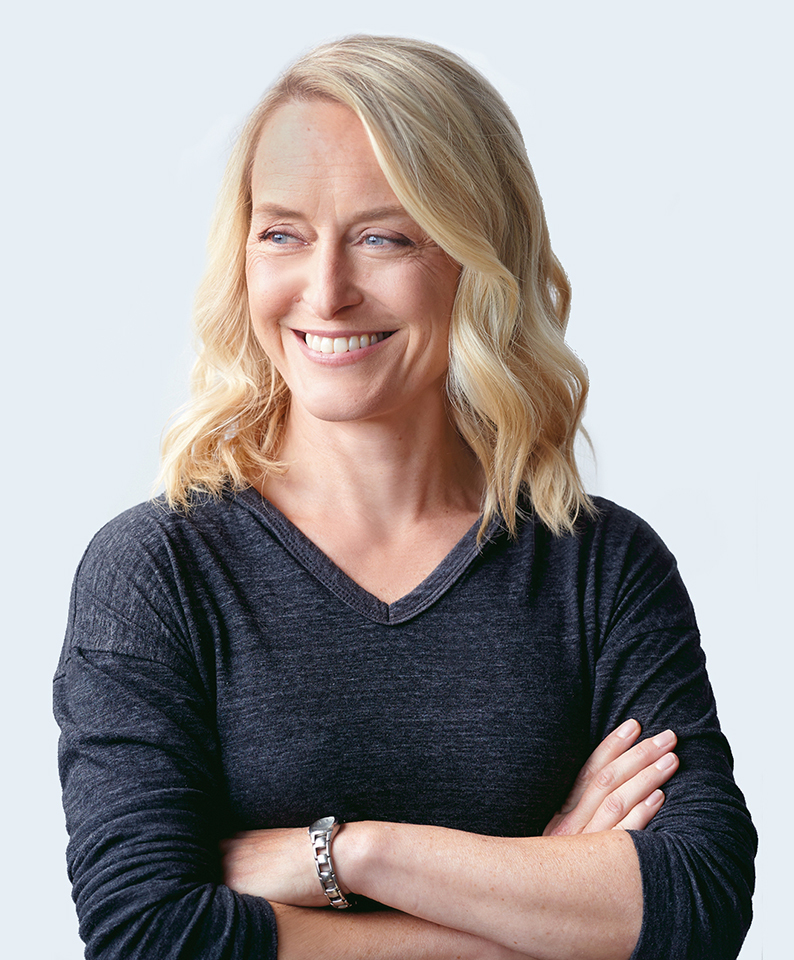
- Morgenstern in 2021
- Born: December 10, 1965 (age 60); Canada
- Occupations: Actress; filmmaker; screenwriter; director
- Years active: 1978–present
- Known for: Original English voice actress of Sailor Venus in Sailor Moon; Regina in Dino Crisis; Co-creator of Flashpoint
- Spouse: Mark Ellis
- Website: stephaniemorgenstern.com

Stephanie Morgenstern (born December 10, 1965) is a Canadian actress, filmmaker, and screenwriter for television and film. She has worked extensively on stage, film, and television in both English and French. Her most widely seen feature film credits have been The Sweet Hereafter, Maelström, Julie and Me (Revoir Julie) and Forbidden Love. Morgenstern is also widely recognized by anime fans as the voice of Sailor Venus in the DIC Entertainment English dub of Sailor Moon in the first few seasons as well as the movies. Additionally, she provided the voice of Regina in the Dino Crisis series, and Yin in Yin Yang Yo!.

== Life and career ==
Along with her writing partner and husband Mark Ellis, Morgenstern created Flashpoint, a Canadian TV police drama which premiered July 2008 on CTV and CBS, and ran for five years before the show ended by creative choice in 2012. The show was awarded the Academy Board of Directors Tribute for Outstanding and Enduring Contribution to Canadian Television, in addition to both a Gemini and Canadian Screen Award for Best Dramatic Series. Flashpoint has been sold to over 50 countries outside of Canada and the U.S. Most recently, they were showrunners on Allegiance (CBC/NBCUniversal), a police procedural set in Surrey, BC.

She and Mark Ellis were also co-creators and showrunners on X Company, a WWII espionage thriller set in France, Germany and Canada. Shot over three years in Budapest, it was also sold to many territories internationally, including France (TF1), UK (History), the United States (Ovation), Latin America (History), and Japan (Mystery). It was also a Canadian Screen Awards nominee for Best Dramatic Series.

Morgenstern has been twice nominated for Genie (Canadian Academy) Awards for directing the short film Remembrance, which she also co-wrote and co-starred in with her husband Mark Ellis, and co-directing (with her brother Mark Morgenstern) the short film Curtains, which she also wrote, an in which she played the lead role.

Morgenstern stated in a 2003 interview that she has synesthesia. She is also a practitioner of Krav Maga martial arts training.

== Filmography ==
=== Director and screenwriter credits ===
Year	Title	Role
1995	Curtains	Writer, actor, Co-Director
2001	Remembrance	Director, Co-Writer, Actor
2008–2012	Flashpoint	Co-Creator, Screenwriter, Executive Producer, Co-Showrunner
2015–2017	X Company	Co-Creator, Screenwriter, Executive Producer, Co-Showrunner, Director
2018	Killjoys Episode 408: It Takes a Pillage	Director
2019	Burden of Truth Episode 203: Guilt by Association, Episode 204: The Milk of Human Kindness	Director
2020	Hudson & Rex Episode 211: "In Pod We Trust"	Director
2020	Nurses Episode 109: Mirror Box	Director

=== Acting ===
Year	Title	Role	Notes
1978	Jacob Two-Two Meets the Hooded Fang	Narrator	
1985	Blue Line	Ilena	
1986	Toby McTeague	Sara	
1989	The Mountain and the Valley	Effie	
1989	Justine's Film (Le film de Justine)		
1990	Moody Beach	Waitress	
1990	Ding et Dong le film	Cheftaine	
1990	The Nutcracker Prince	Louise (voice)	
1993	Taking Liberty	Sarah	
1995	Butterbox Babies	Dorothy / Daisy	
1995	Curtains	Claire	Short film
1997	The Sweet Hereafter	Allison	Winner: Best Acting by an Ensemble (National Board of Review, USA)
1998	2 Seconds	Sugrun	
1998	Julie and Me (Revoir Julie)	Juliet	
1999	The Rememberer	Annie	Short film
2000	Sailor Moon R the Movie: Promise of the Rose	Mina - Sailor Venus (voice)	
2000	Shooter	Chris	Short film
2000	Believe	Mary Alice Stiles	
2000	Sailor Moon S the Movie: Hearts in Ice	Mina - Sailor Venus (voice)	
2000	Sailor Moon Super S the Movie: Black Dream Hole	Mina - Sailor Venus (voice)	
2000	Maelström	Claire Gunderson	
2000	Café Olé	Sharon	
2000	Passengers	Rachel	Short film
2001	Remembrance	Aurora Isaacs	Short film
2002	Blue Skies	Dresser	Short film
2003	Blizzard	Miss Ward	
2003	Cold Creek Manor	Local	
2007	Bonded Pairs	Rosemary	Short film

=== Television ===
Year	Title	Role	Notes
1983	Hangin' In	Nicole	Episode: "She Strips to Conquer"
1986	Spearfield's Daughter	Trudi	TV miniseries
1989	Friday the 13th: The Series	Rachel Horn	Episode: "Crippled Inside"
1989–1990	The Smoggies	Princess Lila / Emma (voice)	TV series
1991	Sweating Bullets	Desnee Paige	Episode: "Runaway"
1991	Rupert	Tiger Lily (voice)	Recurring role (4 episodes)
1992	Partners 'n Love	Angela	TV film
1992	Midnight Cob	Jiggs	TV series
1993	Kung Fu: The Legend Continues	Laura	Episode: "Disciple"
1994	Forever Knight	Young Katherine Barrington	Episode: "Forward Into the Past"
1994	Tales from the Cryptkeeper	June (voice)	Episodes: "Cold Blood, Warm Heart/The Spider and the Flies", "The Haunted Mine"
1995, 1998	Sailor Moon	Mina - Sailor Venus (voice)	Main role (54 episodes), DIC dub
1996	Blazing Dragons	Princess Flame (voice)	TV series
1997	Exhibit A: Secrets of Forensic Science	Maria Talbert	Episode: "Schemes and Dreams"
1997	Rupert	Tiger Lily (voice)	Episode: "Rupert and the Crystal Ball"
1998	Mind Games	Anna	TV film
1998	Mythic Warriors	Speaking Oak (voice)	Episode: "Jason and the Argonauts"
1998	Birdz	Steffy Storkowitz (voice)	TV series
1999	Our Guys: Outrage at Glen Ridge	Professor	TV film
1999	P.T. Barnum	Nancy (Fish)	TV film
1999	Power Stone	Ayame (voice)	TV series
2000	Wind at My Back	Lillian Day	Episode: "Faith Healer"
2001	La vie, la vie	Jennifer	Episode: "La dernière tentation"
2001	All Souls	Emily McKaye	Episode: "Pilot"
2003	Miss Spider's Sunny Patch Kids	Ladybug (voice)	TV film
2003	Missing	Victoria Feldon	Episode: "Victoria"
2004	Bliss	Penelope	Episode: "Penelope and Her Suitors"
2004	This Is Wonderland	Leslie Clark	Recurring role (9 episodes)
2004–2006	Atomic Betty	Megan	Recurring role (7 episodes)
2005	Riding the Bus with My Sister	Olivia	TV film
2005	Miss BG	Aunt Alice (voice)	TV series
2006	At the Hotel	Gerta	Episodes: "Welcome to the Rousseau", "Modern Solutions to Modern Problems", "Doesn't Anyone Want to Ask Me About My Dress?"
2006–2009	Yin Yang Yo!	Yin, Chung Pow Kitties (voice)	Main role, recurring role
2008	Degrassi: The Next Generation	Doc Rota	Episode: "Death or Glory: Part 1"
2008–2009	Flashpoint	Hostage, Female Officer	Episodes: "Scorpio" and "Haunting the Barn"

=== Video games ===
Year	Title	Role
1999	Dino Crisis	Regina (voice)
2000	Dino Crisis 2	Regina (voice)

Preceded by None	Voice of Sailor Venus; Eps. 29 - 82, Movies	Succeeded by Emilie-Claire Barlow
