= Aubrey Nealon =

Canadian film and television director

Aubrey Nealon (born 1971 in New Denver, British Columbia) is a Canadian film and television director, producer and writer, most noted as the creator and showrunner of the CTV drama series Cardinal.

Nealon began his career as a teen actor, with a minor role as oddball Finnish exchange student "Olaf" on the YTV/Nickelodeon teen soap opera Hillside (aka Fifteen in the U.S.). A graduate of the Vancouver Film School, Nealon directed the short films House Arrest, Abe's Manhood and In Memoriam before releasing his semi-autobiographical feature film debut A Simple Curve in 2005. The film was named to the Toronto International Film Festival's year-end Canada's Top Ten list for 2005, was a Leo Award nominee for Best Picture, Best Director and Best Screenplay in 2006, and received a Directors Guild of Canada nomination for Best Feature Film in 2006.

Following A Simple Curve he has worked predominantly in television, including writing and producing for Flashpoint, Rookie Blue, Saving Hope, Orphan Black, Frontier, Ten Days in the Valley and Snowpiercer. He won the Canadian Screen Award for Best Writing in a Dramatic Series at the 1st Canadian Screen Awards in 2013 for the Flashpoint episode "Day Game", and was a nominee in the same category at the 5th Canadian Screen Awards in 2017 for the Orphan Black episode "The Stigmata of Progress". At the 6th Canadian Screen Awards in 2018, he was a nominee for Best Writing in Drama Program or Limited Series for Cardinal.
