= Curtains (1995 film) =

- French: Rideau
- Directed by: Stephanie Morgenstern; Mark Morgenstern
- Written by: Stephanie Morgenstern
- Produced by: Stephanie Morgenstern; Mark Morgenstern
- Starring: Stephanie Morgenstern; Maxim Roy; Andrew Tarbet; Éric Bernier; Cary Lawrence; Neil Kroetsch; Glenn Roy; Ismael Silva
- Cinematography: Mark Morgenstern
- Edited by: Mark Morgenstern; Stephanie Morgenstern
- Production company: Filmo Bandito
- Distributed by: Ewola Cinema
- Release date: September 22, 1995
- Running time: 12 minutes
- Country: Canada
- Languages: English; French

Curtains (French: Rideau) is a Canadian short film, directed by Stephanie Morgenstern and Mark Morgenstern and released in 1995. The film was a Genie Award nominee for Best Theatrical Short Film at the 17th Genie Awards in 1996.

== Plot ==
An actress, having just discovered she's been dumped, questions everything around her in the 15 minutes before the curtain comes up and she must take her place on stage. In the process, we get a glance at what goes on behind the scenes in your average theatre production.
