= Canadian Screen Award for Best Dramatic Series =

Annual Canadian television award

- Country: Canada
- Presented by: Academy of Canadian Cinema & Television
- First award: 1986
- Currently held by: Heated Rivalry (2025)
- Website: academy.ca/awards

The Academy of Canadian Cinema and Television presents an annual award for Best Dramatic Series. Formerly presented as part of the Gemini Awards program, since 2013 the award has been presented as part of the expanded Canadian Screen Awards.

== 1980s ==
Year	Program	Producers	Network	Ref
1986; 1st Gemini Awards
1986; 1st Gemini Awards	Night Heat	Andras Hamori	CTV	
1986; 1st Gemini Awards	The Campbells	John Delmage	CTV	
1986; 1st Gemini Awards	Danger Bay	Paul Saltzman	CBC	
1987; 2nd Gemini Awards
1987; 2nd Gemini Awards	Night Heat	Stephen J. Roth, Larry Jacobson, Sonny Grosso, Andras Hamori	CTV	
1987; 2nd Gemini Awards	Red Serge	Neil Sutherland	CBC	
1987; 2nd Gemini Awards	Street Legal	Maryke McEwen	CBC	
1988; 3rd Gemini Awards
1988; 3rd Gemini Awards	Degrassi Junior High	Kit Hood, Linda Schuyler	CBC	
1988; 3rd Gemini Awards	He Shoots, He Scores	Claude Héroux	CBC	
1988; 3rd Gemini Awards	Night Heat	Stephen J. Roth, Larry Jacobson, Sonny Grosso, Andras Hamori, Jeff King	CTV	
1988; 3rd Gemini Awards	Street Legal	Maryke McEwen	CBC	
1989; 4th Gemini Awards
1989; 4th Gemini Awards	Degrassi Junior High	Kit Hood, Linda Schuyler	CBC	
1989; 4th Gemini Awards	9B	James Swan	CBC	
1989; 4th Gemini Awards	Danger Bay	Paul Quigley, Harold Lee Tichenor, Paul Saltzman	CBC	
1989; 4th Gemini Awards	Street Legal	Maryke McEwen, Brenda Greenberg	CBC	

== 1990s ==
Year	Program	Producers	Network	Ref
1990; 5th Gemini Awards
1990; 5th Gemini Awards	E.N.G.	R.B. Carney, Jennifer Black, Jeff King, Robert Lantos	CTV	
1990; 5th Gemini Awards	Danger Bay	Harold Lee Tichenor, Paul Saltzman, Paul Quigley	CBC	
1990; 5th Gemini Awards	Road to Avonlea	Trudy Grant, Kevin Sullivan	CBC	
1990; 5th Gemini Awards	Street Legal	Brenda Greenberg, David Pears, Duncan Lamb	CBC	
1991; 6th Gemini Awards
1991; 6th Gemini Awards	E.N.G.	R.B. Carney, Jennifer Black, Jeff King, Robert Lantos	CTV	
1991; 6th Gemini Awards	Degrassi High	Kit Hood, Linda Schuyler	CBC	
1991; 6th Gemini Awards	Mom P.I.	Jonathan Goodwill, Chris Haddock, Michael MacMillan	CBC	
1991; 6th Gemini Awards	Road to Avonlea	Trudy Grant, Kevin Sullivan	CBC	
1991; 6th Gemini Awards	Urban Angel	Jamie Brown, Paul E. Painter, Robin Spry	CBC	
1992; 7th Gemini Awards
1992; 7th Gemini Awards	E.N.G.	R.B. Carney, Jennifer Black, Jeff King, Robert Lantos	CTV	
1992; 7th Gemini Awards	Neon Rider	Justis Greene, Danny Virtue, Winston Rekert	CTV	
1992; 7th Gemini Awards	Road to Avonlea	Trudy Grant, Kevin Sullivan	CBC	
1992; 7th Gemini Awards	Street Legal	Brenda Greenberg, Nicholas Rose, Duncan Lamb	CTV	
1993; 8th Gemini Awards
1993; 8th Gemini Awards	E.N.G.	Jennifer Black, Greg Copeland, Robert Lantos	CTV	
1993; 8th Gemini Awards	Beyond Reality	Janet E. Cuddy, Jon Slan, Richard Borchiver	CTV	
1993; 8th Gemini Awards	Forever Knight	Richard Borchiver, Nicholas J. Gray, James D. Parriott, Lionel E. Siegel, Jon Slan	BBS	
1993; 8th Gemini Awards	North of 60	Tom Cox, Doug MacLeod, Robert Lantos, Barbara Samuels	CBC	
1993; 8th Gemini Awards	Street Legal	Brenda Greenberg, Nicholas Rose, Duncan Lamb	CBC	
1994; 9th Gemini Awards
1994; 9th Gemini Awards	Due South	Jeff King, Paul Haggis, Kathy Slevin	CTV	
1994; 9th Gemini Awards	Destiny Ridge	Andy Thomson, Larry Raskin, Bill Gray, Anne Marie La Traverse, Mary Kahn	Global	
1994; 9th Gemini Awards	E.N.G.	Jennifer Black, Robert Lantos, David Barlow	CTV	
1994; 9th Gemini Awards	Neon Rider	Winston Rekert, Danny Virtue, Michael MacMillan	YTV	
1994; 9th Gemini Awards	Road to Avonlea	Trudy Grant, Kevin Sullivan	CBC	
1994; 9th Gemini Awards	Street Legal	Chris Paton, Duncan Lamb, Nada Harcourt, Jan Dutton, Helen Kafka	CBC	
1995; 10th Gemini Awards
1995; 10th Gemini Awards	Due South	Jeff King, Kathy Slevin, Paul Haggis, George Bloomfield	CTV	
1995; 10th Gemini Awards	Highlander: The Series	Marla Ginsburg, William N. Panzer, Christian Charret, Nicolas Clermont, Ken Gord	CHCH-TV	
1995; 10th Gemini Awards	North of 60	Tom Cox, Doug MacLeod, Barbara Samuels, Peter Lauterman, Wayne Grigsby	CBC	
1995; 10th Gemini Awards	Road to Avonlea	Trudy Grant, Kevin Sullivan	CBC	
1995; 10th Gemini Awards	TekWar	John Calvert, Stephen Roloff, William Shatner	CTV	
1996; 11th Gemini Awards
1996; 11th Gemini Awards	Due South	Jeff King, Robert Wertheimer, George Bloomfield, Kathy Slevin	CTV	
1996; 11th Gemini Awards	Forever Knight	Jon Slan, Richard Borchiver, James D. Parriott	BBS	
1996; 11th Gemini Awards	North of 60	Doug MacLeod, Wayne Grigsby, Peter Lauterman, Tom Cox, Barbara Samuels	CBC	
1996; 11th Gemini Awards	Road to Avonlea	Trudy Grant, Kevin Sullivan, John Ryan	CBC	
1996; 11th Gemini Awards	Traders	David Shore, Mary Kahn, Seaton McLean, Alyson Feltes	Global	
1997; 12th Gemini Awards
1997; 12th Gemini Awards	Traders	Mary Kahn, Hart Hanson, Alyson Feltes, Seaton McLean	Global	
1997; 12th Gemini Awards	Black Harbour	Wayne Grigsby, Robert B. Carney, David MacLeod, Barbara Samuels, Michael Volpe	CBC	
1997; 12th Gemini Awards	Jake and the Kid	Patrick Loubert, Andy Thomson, Peter Lhotka, Arvi Liimatainen, Stephen Hogins	Global	
1997; 12th Gemini Awards	North of 60	Doug MacLeod, Barbara Samuels, Wayne Grigsby, Peter Lauterman, Tom Cox	CBC	
1997; 12th Gemini Awards	The Outer Limits	Jonathan Glassner, Pen Densham, James Nadler, Richard Barton Lewis, John Watson, Sam Egan, Brad Wright, Brent Karl Clackson	Global	
1998; 13th Gemini Awards
1998; 13th Gemini Awards	Traders	Sandie Pereira, Hart Hanson, Alyson Feltes	Global	
1998; 13th Gemini Awards	Cold Squad	Philip Keatley, Seaton McLean, Anne Marie La Traverse, Julia Keatley, Matt MacLeod	CTV	
1998; 13th Gemini Awards	Due South	Paul Gross, Peter Bray, Frank Siracusa, R.B. Carney, George Bloomfield	CTV	
1998; 13th Gemini Awards	Emily of New Moon	Marlene Matthews, Ronald A. Weinberg, Michael Donovan, Micheline Charest	CBC	
1998; 13th Gemini Awards	Once a Thief	Terence Chang, John Woo, William Laurin, Wendy Grean, Glenn Davis	CTV	
1999; 14th Gemini Awards
1999; 14th Gemini Awards	Da Vinci's Inquest	Chris Haddock, Laszlo Barna	CBC	
1999; 14th Gemini Awards	Armistead Maupin's More Tales of the City	Kevin Tierney, Suzanne Girard, Alan Poul, Tim Bevan	Bravo	
1999; 14th Gemini Awards	Foolish Heart	Ken Finkleman, Brian Dennis	CBC	
1999; 14th Gemini Awards	Nikita	Jamie Paul Rock, Jay Firestone	CTV	
1999; 14th Gemini Awards	Traders	Seaton McLean, Sandie Pereira, Peter Mitchell	Global	

== 2000s ==
Year	Program	Producers	Network	Ref
2000; 15th Gemini Awards
2000; 15th Gemini Awards	Da Vinci's Inquest	Tom Braidwood, Laszlo Barna, Lynn Barr, Chris Haddock	CBC	
2000; 15th Gemini Awards	Drop the Beat	Adrienne Mitchell, Christine Shipton, Janis Lundman	CBC	
2000; 15th Gemini Awards	The Outer Limits	John Watson, Brent Karl Clackson, Pen Densham, Sam Egan, Richard Barton Lewis	Global	
2000; 15th Gemini Awards	Stargate SG-1	Jonathan Glassner, N. John Smith, Robert C. Cooper, Michael Greenburg, Richard Dean Anderson, Brad Wright	CHEK-CHCH	
2000; 15th Gemini Awards	Twice in a Lifetime	Michael Prupas, Stephen Brackley, Barney Rosenzweig, Marilyn Stonehouse, Michael J. Maschio	CTV	
2001; 16th Gemini Awards
2001; 16th Gemini Awards	Da Vinci's Inquest	Laszlo Barna, Chris Haddock, Lynn Barr, Arvi Liimatainen	CBC	
2001; 16th Gemini Awards	The Associates	Brian Dennis, Anne Marie La Traverse, Steve Blackman, Greg Ball, Alyson Feltes, Maureen McKeon	CTV	
2001; 16th Gemini Awards	Blue Murder	Laszlo Barna, Norman Denver, Steve Lucas	Global	
2001; 16th Gemini Awards	Drop the Beat	Janis Lundman, Susan Alexander, Adrienne Mitchell, Suzanne Chapman	CBC	
2001; 16th Gemini Awards	The Outer Limits	John Watson, Richard Barton Lewis, Mark Stern, Brent Karl Clackson, Pen Densham, Sam Egan	Global	
2002; 17th Gemini Awards
2002; 17th Gemini Awards	Da Vinci's Inquest	Lynn Barr, Chris Haddock, Arvi Liimatainen, Laszlo Barna	CBC	
2002; 17th Gemini Awards	Bliss	Arnie Gelbart, Janis Lundman, Adrienne Mitchell, Ian Whitehead	Showcase	
2002; 17th Gemini Awards	Cold Squad	Peter Mitchell, Suzanne Chapman, Gigi Boyd, Steve Ord, Matt MacLeod, Julia Keatley, Gary Harvey	CTV	
2002; 17th Gemini Awards	Dice	Lorraine Richard, Greg Dummett, Gub Neal	TMN-MC	
2002; 17th Gemini Awards	Foreign Objects	Daniel Iron, Ken Finkleman, Niv Fichman	CBC	
2003; 18th Gemini Awards
2003; 18th Gemini Awards	The Eleventh Hour	Ilana Frank, Semi Chellas, Anne Marie La Traverse, Brian Dennis	CTV	
2003; 18th Gemini Awards	The Atwood Stories	Kim Todd, Francine Zuckerman, Christina Jennings, Lori Spring, Laura Harbin, Scott Garvie	W	
2003; 18th Gemini Awards	Blue Murder	Laszlo Barna, Steve Lucas, Norman Denver	Global	
2003; 18th Gemini Awards	Cold Squad	Peter Mitchell, Jon Pilatzke, Gigi Boyd, Steve Ord, Gary Harvey, Matt MacLeod, Julia Keatley	CTV	
2003; 18th Gemini Awards	Da Vinci's Inquest	Lynn Barr, Chris Haddock, Arvi Liimatainen, Laszlo Barna	CBC	
2004; 19th Gemini Awards
2004; 19th Gemini Awards	Da Vinci's Inquest	Chris Haddock, Arvi Liimatainen, Laszlo Barna	CBC	
2004; 19th Gemini Awards	Bliss	Arnie Gelbart, Janis Lundman, Ian Whitehead, Adrienne Mitchell	Showcase	
2004; 19th Gemini Awards	The Eleventh Hour	Semi Chellas, Ray Sager, David Wellington, Seaton McLean, Ilana Frank	CTV	
2004; 19th Gemini Awards	The Shields Stories	Christina Jennings, Scott Garvie, Kim Todd, Laura Harbin, Lori Spring	W	
2004; 19th Gemini Awards	Slings & Arrows	Sari Friedland, Niv Fichman, Daniel Iron	TMN-MC	
2004; 19th Gemini Awards	Snakes and Ladders	Wayne Grigsby, David MacLeod	CBC	
2005; 20th Gemini Awards
2005; 20th Gemini Awards	The Eleventh Hour	Semi Chellas, Ilana Frank, Daphne Park, Ray Sager, Peter R. Simpson, David Wellington	CTV	
2005; 20th Gemini Awards	Da Vinci's Inquest	Chris Haddock, Laszlo Barna, Laura Lightbown, Arvi Liimatainen	CBC	
2005; 20th Gemini Awards	Degrassi: The Next Generation	Linda Schuyler, Aaron Martin, Stephen Stohn	CTV	
2005; 20th Gemini Awards	Godiva's	Julia Keatley, Gigi Boyd, Michael MacLennan	Citytv	
2005; 20th Gemini Awards	ReGenesis	Christina Jennings, Tom Chehak, Scott Garvie, Laura Harbin, Shane Kinnear, Virginia Rankin	TMN-MC	
2005; 20th Gemini Awards	This Is Wonderland	Bernard Zukerman, Michael Prupas, Dani Romain, George F. Walker	CBC	
2006; 21st Gemini Awards
2006; 21st Gemini Awards	Slings & Arrows	Niv Fichman, Sari Friedland, Daniel Iron	TMN-MC	
2006; 21st Gemini Awards	Moccasin Flats	Laura Miliken, Jennifer Podemski	APTN	
2006; 21st Gemini Awards	ReGenesis	Christina Jennings, Tom Chehak, Scott Garvie, Avrum Jacobson, Shane Kinnear, Laurie McLarty, Jamie Paul Rock	TMN-MC	
2006; 21st Gemini Awards	Terminal City	Jayme Pfahl, Angus Fraser, Gordon Mark	TMN-MC	
2006; 21st Gemini Awards	This Is Wonderland	Dani Romain, Thom J. Pretak, Michael Prupas, George F. Walker, Bernard Zukerman	CBC	
2007; 22nd Gemini Awards
2007; 22nd Gemini Awards	Slings & Arrows	Niv Fichman, Sari Friedland	TMN-MC	
2007; 22nd Gemini Awards	Intelligence	Chris Haddock, Laura Lightbown, Arvi Liimatainen	CBC	
2007; 22nd Gemini Awards	Jozi-H	Alfons Adetuyi, Amos Adetuyi, Adeelah Carrim, Tony Dennis, Alyson Feltes, Marva Ollivierre, Stephen J. Turnbull, Mfundi Vundla	CBC	
2007; 22nd Gemini Awards	ReGenesis	Christina Jennings, Tom Chehak, Manny Danelon, Scott Garvie, Laura Harbin, Avrum Jacobson, Shane Kinnear	TMN-MC	
2007; 22nd Gemini Awards	Whistler	Danny Virtue, John Barbisan, Kelly Senecal, Noreen Halpern, Janet York, John Morayniss, Sam Feldman, Ian McDougall	CTV	
2008; 23rd Gemini Awards
2008; 23rd Gemini Awards	Intelligence	Chris Haddock, Arvi Liimatainen, Laura Lightbown	CBC	
2008; 23rd Gemini Awards	The Border	Peter Raymont, David Barlow, Brian Dennis, Janet Maclean	CBC	
2008; 23rd Gemini Awards	Durham County	Janis Lundman, Adrienne Mitchell, Michael Prupas	TMN-MC	
2008; 23rd Gemini Awards	Murdoch Mysteries	Christina Jennings, Cal Coons, Scott Garvie, Noel Hedges, Jan Peter Meyboom	Citytv	
2008; 23rd Gemini Awards	The Tudors	Sheila Hockin, Morgan O'Sullivan	CBC	
2009; 24th Gemini Awards
2009; 24th Gemini Awards	Flashpoint	Anne Marie La Traverse, Bill Mustos	CTV	
2009; 24th Gemini Awards	Being Erica	Jana Sinyor, Ivan Schneeberg, David Fortier, Aaron Martin	CBC	
2009; 24th Gemini Awards	The Border	Janet Maclean, Peter Raymont, David Barlow, Brian Dennis	CBC	
2009; 24th Gemini Awards	The Tudors	Sheila Hockin, Gary Howsam, Morgan O'Sullivan	CBC	
2009; 24th Gemini Awards	ZOS: Zone of Separation	Paul Gross, Frank Siracusa, Mario Philip Azzopardi, Andrea Raffaghello, Malcolm MacRury	TMN-MC	

== 2010s ==
Year	Program	Producers	Network	Ref
2010; 25th Gemini Awards
2010; 25th Gemini Awards	The Tudors	Morgan O'Sullivan, John Weber, Sheila Hockin	CBC	
2010; 25th Gemini Awards	Durham County	Laurie Finstad-Knizhnik, Michael Prupas, Adrienne Mitchell, Janis Lundman	TMN-MC	
2010; 25th Gemini Awards	Flashpoint	Anne Marie La Traverse, Bill Mustos	CTV	
2010; 25th Gemini Awards	Republic of Doyle	Rob Blackie, John Vatcher, Allan Hawco, Michael Levine	CBC	
2010; 25th Gemini Awards	Stargate Universe	John G. Lenic, Robert C. Cooper, Brad Wright, N. John Smith, Carl Binder	A	
2011; 26th Gemini Awards
2011; 26th Gemini Awards	The Borgias	Neil Jordan, James Flynn, Sheila Hockin, John Weber	Bravo/CTV	
2011; 26th Gemini Awards	Endgame	Michael Shepard, Avrum Jacobson, Harvey Kahn, Alexandra Raffé	Showcase	
2011; 26th Gemini Awards	Flashpoint	Anne Marie La Traverse, Bill Mustos	CTV	
2011; 26th Gemini Awards	Skins	Bryan Elsley, Laszlo Barna, Manny Danelon, George Faber, Matt Jones, Margaret O'Brien, Charles Pattinson, Michael Rosenberg	TMN-MC	
2011; 26th Gemini Awards	The Tudors	Michael Hirst, Sheila Hockin, Morgan O'Sullivan, John Weber	CBC	
2012; 1st Canadian Screen Awards
2012; 1st Canadian Screen Awards	Flashpoint	Stephanie Morgenstern, Bill Mustos, Anne Marie La Traverse, Mark Ellis	CTV	
2012; 1st Canadian Screen Awards	Arctic Air	Michael Chechik, Ian Weir, Gabriela Schonbach, Gary Harvey	CBC	
2012; 1st Canadian Screen Awards	Bomb Girls	Michael Prupas, Michael MacLennan, Adrienne Mitchell, Janis Lundman	Global	
2012; 1st Canadian Screen Awards	Continuum	Holly Redford, Matthew O'Connor, Jeff King, Lisa Richardson, Pat Williams, Tom Rowe, Simon Barry	Showcase	
2012; 1st Canadian Screen Awards	King	Bernard Zukerman, Greg Spottiswood	Showcase	
2013; 2nd Canadian Screen Awards
2013; 2nd Canadian Screen Awards	Orphan Black	Claire Welland, David Fortier, Graeme Manson, Ivan Schneeberg, John Fawcett, Karen Walton, Kerry Appleyard	Space	
2013; 2nd Canadian Screen Awards	Blackstone	Damon Vignale, Jesse Szymanski, Ron E. Scott	APTN, Showcase	
2013; 2nd Canadian Screen Awards	Bomb Girls	Adrienne Mitchell, Janis Lundman, Michael MacLennan, Michael Prupas	Global	
2013; 2nd Canadian Screen Awards	Flashpoint	Anne Marie La Traverse, Bill Mustos, Mark Ellis, Stephanie Morgenstern	CTV	
2013; 2nd Canadian Screen Awards	Motive	Daegan Fryklind, Daniel Cerone, Dennis Heaton, Erin Haskett, James Thorpe, John G. Lenic, Lindsay MacAdam, Louise Clark, Rob LaBelle, Rob Merilees	CTV	
2014; 3rd Canadian Screen Awards
2014; 3rd Canadian Screen Awards	Orphan Black	Kerry Appleyard, Andrea Boyd, John Fawcett, David Fortier, Alex Levine, Graeme Manson, Ivan Schneeberg, Karen Walton, Claire Welland	Space	
2014; 3rd Canadian Screen Awards	19-2	Luc Châtelain, Jocelyn Deschênes, Saralo MacGregor, Jesse McKeown, Carolyn Newman, Greg Phillips, Virginia Rankin, Bruce M. Smith	Bravo	
2014; 3rd Canadian Screen Awards	Continuum	Simon Barry, Lisa Richardson, Matthew O'Connor, Holly Redford, Tom Rowe, Pat Williams	Showcase	
2014; 3rd Canadian Screen Awards	Motive	Daniel Cerone, Louise Clark, Erin Haskett, Dennis Heaton, Rob LaBelle, Lindsay MacAdam, Rob Merilees, Derek Schreyer, James Thorpe	CTV	
2014; 3rd Canadian Screen Awards	Remedy	Greg Spottiswood, Bernard Zukerman	Global	
2015; 4th Canadian Screen Awards
2015; 4th Canadian Screen Awards	19-2	Jocelyn Deschênes, Virginia Rankin, Luc Châtelain, Bruce M. Smith, Jesse McKeown, Saralo MacGregor	Bravo	
2015; 4th Canadian Screen Awards	Blackstone	Ron E. Scott, Jesse Szymanski, Damon Vignale	APTN, Showcase	
2015; 4th Canadian Screen Awards	Motive	Daniel Cerone, Dennis Heaton, Louise Clark, Robert Merilees, Erin Haskett, Robert LaBelle, Lindsay Macadam, Brad Van Arragon, Kristin Lehman	CTV	
2015; 4th Canadian Screen Awards	Saving Hope	Ilana Frank, David Wellington, Adam Pettle, Morwyn Brebner, John Morayniss, Margaret O’Brien, Leslie Harrison	CTV	
2015; 4th Canadian Screen Awards	X Company	Ivan Schneeberg, David Fortier, Andrea Boyd, Mark Ellis, Stephanie Morgenstern, Bill Haber, Denis McGrath, Rosalie Carew, John Calvert	CBC	
2016; 5th Canadian Screen Awards
2016; 5th Canadian Screen Awards	Orphan Black	Ivan Schneeberg, David Fortier, John Fawcett, Graeme Manson, Claire Welland, Kerry Appleyard, Alex Levine, Peter Mohan, Tatiana Maslany	Space	
2016; 5th Canadian Screen Awards	19-2	Jocelyn Deschênes, Virginia Rankin, Bruce M. Smith, Josée Vallée, Luc Châtelain, Greg Phillips, Saralo MacGregor	Bravo	
2016; 5th Canadian Screen Awards	Blood and Water	Ira Levy, Peter Williamson, Nat Abraham, Michael McGuigan, Neil Bregman, Al Kratina, Dan Trotta, Diane Boehme	OMNI	
2016; 5th Canadian Screen Awards	This Life	Jocelyn Deschênes, Virginia Rankin, Joseph Kay, Richard Blaimert, Josée Vallée	CBC	
2016; 5th Canadian Screen Awards	Vikings	Sheila Hockin, John Weber, Michael Hirst, Morgan O'Sullivan, James Flynn, Alan Gasmer, Sherry Marsh, Bill Goddard	History	
2017; 6th Canadian Screen Awards
2017; 6th Canadian Screen Awards	Anne with an E	Moira Walley-Beckett, Miranda de Pencier	CBC	
2017; 6th Canadian Screen Awards	19-2	Jocelyn Deschênes, Luc Châtelain, Bruce M. Smith, Virginia Rankin, Josée Vallée, Greg Phillips, Saralo MacGregor	Bravo	
2017; 6th Canadian Screen Awards	Mary Kills People	Tassie Cameron, Amy Cameron, Jocelyn Hamilton, Tecca Crosby, Tara Armstrong, Holly Dale	Global	
2017; 6th Canadian Screen Awards	Pure	David MacLeod, Michael Amo, Ken Girotti, Brett Burlock, Peter Emerson	CBC	
2017; 6th Canadian Screen Awards	Vikings	Sheila Hockin, John Weber, Michael Hirst, Morgan O'Sullivan, James Flynn, Alan Gasmer, Sherry Marsh, Bill Goddard	History	
2018; 7th Canadian Screen Awards
2018; 7th Canadian Screen Awards	Anne with an E	Moira Walley-Beckett, Miranda de Pencier	CBC	
2018; 7th Canadian Screen Awards	Bad Blood	Mark Montefiore, Josée Vallée, Michael Konyves, Kim Coates, Paula J. Smith	Citytv	
2018; 7th Canadian Screen Awards	Blood and Water	Diane Boehme, Al Kratina, Ira Levy, Peter Williamson, Nat Abraham, Michael McGuigan, Steph Song, Yipeng Ben Lu, Paula J. Smith	OMNI	
2018; 7th Canadian Screen Awards	Frankie Drake Mysteries	Carol Hay, Jonathan Hackett, Christina Jennings, Scott Garvie, Cal Coons, Michelle Ricci, Greg Phillips, Saralo MacGregor	CBC	
2018; 7th Canadian Screen Awards	Vikings	Sheila Hockin, John Weber, Michael Hirst, Morgan O'Sullivan, James Flynn, Alan Gasmer, Sherry Marsh, Bill Goddard	History	
2019; 8th Canadian Screen Awards
2019; 8th Canadian Screen Awards	Cardinal	Jennifer Kawaja, Julia Sereny, Patrick Tarr, Daniel Grou, Jocelyn Hamilton, Armand Leo	CTV	
2019; 8th Canadian Screen Awards	Anne with an E	Moira Walley-Beckett, Miranda de Pencier	CBC	
2019; 8th Canadian Screen Awards	Coroner	Adrienne Mitchell, Morwyn Brebner, Jonas Prupas, Peter Emerson, Brett Burlock	CBC	
2019; 8th Canadian Screen Awards	Mary Kills People	Jocelyn Hamilton, Amy Cameron, Tassie Cameron, Marsha Greene, Tecca Crosby	Global	
2019; 8th Canadian Screen Awards	Vikings	Sheila Hockin, John Weber, Michael Hirst, Morgan O'Sullivan, James Flynn, Alan Gasmer, Sherry Marsh, Bill Goddard	History	

== 2020s ==
Year	Program	Producers	Network	Ref
2020; 9th Canadian Screen Awards
2020; 9th Canadian Screen Awards	Transplant	Jocelyn Deschênes, Bruno Dubé, Joseph Kay, Randy Lennox, Virginia Rankin, Jeremy Spry, Tara Woodbury	CTV	
2020; 9th Canadian Screen Awards	Burden of Truth	Ilana Frank, Linda Pope, Adam Pettle, Jocelyn Hamilton, Kyle Irving, Brad Simpson, Lisa Meeches	CBC	
2020; 9th Canadian Screen Awards	Cardinal: Until the Night	Jennifer Kawaja, Julia Sereny, Randy Lennox, Jocelyn Hamilton, Patrick Tarr, Nathan Morlando, Jessica Daniel	CTV	
2020; 9th Canadian Screen Awards	Departure	Christina Jennings, Scott Garvie, Malcolm MacRury, T.J. Scott, Vincent Shiao, Patrick Cassavetti	Global	
2020; 9th Canadian Screen Awards	Vikings	Sheila Hockin, John Weber, Michael Hirst, Morgan O’Sullivan, James Flynn, Alan Gasmer, Sherry Marsh, Bill Goddard	History	
2021; 10th Canadian Screen Awards
2021; 10th Canadian Screen Awards	Transplant	Jocelyn Deschênes, Bruno Dubé, Joseph Kay, Tara Woodbury, Virginia Rankin, Josée Vallée, Stefan Pleszczynski, Adam Barken	CTV	
2021; 10th Canadian Screen Awards	Coroner	Adrienne Mitchell, Morwyn Brebner, Jonas Prupas, Peter Emerson, Brett Burlock, Suzanne Colvin-Goulding	CBC	
2021; 10th Canadian Screen Awards	Moonshine	Sheri Elwood, Charles Bishop, Jocelyn Hamilton	CBC	
2021; 10th Canadian Screen Awards	The North Water	Niv Fichman, Kate Ogborn, Jamie Laurenson, Hakan Kousetta, Iain Canning, Emile Sherman, Andrew Haigh, Kevin Krikst, Fraser Ash	CBC	
2021; 10th Canadian Screen Awards	Vikings	Sheila Hockin, John Weber, Michael Hirst, Morgan O’Sullivan, James Flynn, Alan Gasmer, Sherry Marsh, Bill Goddard	History	
2022; 11th Canadian Screen Awards
2022; 11th Canadian Screen Awards	The Porter	Jennifer Kawaja, Ian Dimerman, Aml Ameen, Alfre Woodard, Bruno Dubé, Marsha Greene, Annmarie Morais, Charles Officer, R.T. Thorne, Arnold Pinnock, Bruce Ramsay, Elise Cousineau, Stephen Cochrane, Andrea Glinski, Daphne Park, Lisa Cichelly	CBC	
2022; 11th Canadian Screen Awards	Departure	Christina Jennings, Scott Garvie, Malcolm MacRury, Jackie May, T.J. Scott, Paul Donovan, Chris Philip, Karine Martin, Vincent Shiao, Nikolijne Troubetzkoy, Marsha Greene, Chris Moreton, Patrick Cassavetti, Teresa M. Ho, Julie Lacey	Global	
2022; 11th Canadian Screen Awards	Moonshine	Jocelyn Hamilton, Charles Bishop, Sheri Elwood, Marc Tetreault	CBC	
2022; 11th Canadian Screen Awards	SkyMed	Vanessa Piazza, Julie Puckrin, Ron Murphy	CBC	
2022; 11th Canadian Screen Awards	Transplant	Joseph Kay, Bruno Dubé, Jocelyn Deschênes, Josée Vallée, Rachel Langer, Stefan Pleszczynski, Sarah Timmins	CTV	
2023; 12th Canadian Screen Awards
2023; 12th Canadian Screen Awards	Little Bird	Jennifer Podemski, Hannah Matty Moscovitch, Christina Fon, Ernest Webb, Catherine Bainbridge, Linda Ludwick, Kim Todd, Nicholas Hirst, Zoe Leigh Hopkins, Elle-Máijá Tailfeathers, Jeremy Podeswa, Christian Vesper, Dante Di Loreto, Tanya Brunel, Jessica Dunn, Claire MacKinnon, Philippe Chabot, Lori Lozinski, Ellen Rutter	Crave, APTN	
2023; 12th Canadian Screen Awards	Essex County	Jeff Lemire, Eilis Kirwan, Christina Piovesan, Andrew Cividino	CBC	
2023; 12th Canadian Screen Awards	Plan B	Louis Morissette, Louis-Philippe Drolet, Mélanie Viau, Jean-François Asselin, Lynne Kamm, Melissa Malkin, Patrick J. Adams	CBC	
2023; 12th Canadian Screen Awards	Slasher: Ripper	Ian Carpenter, Aaron Martin, Adam MacDonald, Christina Jennings, Scott Garvie	Hollywood Suite	
2023; 12th Canadian Screen Awards	Transplant	Joseph Kay, Bruno Dubé, Jocelyn Deschênes, Josée Vallée, Rachel Langer, Stefan Pleszczynski, Sarah Timmins	CTV	
2024; 13th Canadian Screen Awards
2024; 13th Canadian Screen Awards	Law & Order Toronto: Criminal Intent	Erin Haskett, Tassie Cameron, Amy Cameron, David Valleau, Alex Patrick, Tex Antonucci, Wanda Chaffey	Citytv	
2024; 13th Canadian Screen Awards	Allegiance	Anar Ali, Mark Ellis, Stephanie Morgenstern, Erin Haskett, Nicole Mendes, David Valleau, Tex Antonucci, Brad Van Arragon	CBC	
2024; 13th Canadian Screen Awards	Bones of Crows	Marie Clements, Trish Dolman, Christine Haebler, Sam Grana	CBC	
2024; 13th Canadian Screen Awards	Potluck Ladies	Shazia Javed	Hollywood Suite	
2024; 13th Canadian Screen Awards	Sight Unseen	Virginia Rankin, Charles Cooper, Carolyn Newman, John Morayniss, Karen Troubetzkoy, Nikolijne Troubetzkoy, John Fawcett, Derek Schreyer	CTV	
2025; 14th Canadian Screen Awards
2025; 14th Canadian Screen Awards	Heated Rivalry	Jacob Tierney, Brendan Brady	Crave	
2025; 14th Canadian Screen Awards	Law & Order Toronto: Criminal Intent	Tassie Cameron, Erin Haskett, Amy Cameron, Alex Patrick, David Valleau, Tex Antonucci, Wanda Chaffey	Citytv	
2025; 14th Canadian Screen Awards	Plan B	Louis Morissette, Louis-Philippe Drolet, Mélanie Viau, Jacques Drolet, Jean-François Asselin, Céleste Parr	CBC Television	
2025; 14th Canadian Screen Awards	Saint-Pierre	Allan Hawco, Erin Sullivan, Janine Squires, Robina Lord-Stafford, John Vatcher, Perry Chafe	CBC Television	
2025; 14th Canadian Screen Awards	Wild Cards	Michael Konyves, Shawn Piller, Charles Cooper, Virginia Rankin, Tashi Bieler, James Genn	CBC Television	

== Multiple awards and nominations ==
Shows that received multiple awards
Awards	Show
5	Da Vinci's Inquest
4	E.N.G.
3	Due South
3	Orphan Black
2
2	Anne with an E
2	Degrassi Junior High
2	The Eleventh Hour
2	Flashpoint
2	Night Heat
2	Slings & Arrows
2	Traders
2	Transplant

Shows that received multiple nominations
Nominations	Show
7	Da Vinci's Inquest
7	Street Legal
6	Road to Avonlea
6	Vikings
5	E.N.G.
5	Flashpoint
4	19-2
4	Due South
4	North of 60
4	Traders
4	The Tudors
3	Anne with an E
3	Cold Squad
3	Danger Bay
3	The Eleventh Hour
3	Motive
3	Night Heat
3	Orphan Black
3	The Outer Limits
3	ReGenesis
3	Slings & Arrows
3	Transplant
2	Blackstone
2	Bliss
2	Blood and Water
2	Blue Murder
2	Bomb Girls
2	The Border
2	Cardinal
2	Continuum
2	Coroner
2	Degrassi Junior High
2	Departure
2	Drop the Beat
2	Durham County
2	Forever Knight
2	Mary Kills People
2	Moonshine
2	Neon Rider
2	This Is Wonderland
