= Outstanding Drama Series =

Outstanding Drama Series is a category for the following awards:

American

- Emmy Award: Primetime Emmy Award for Outstanding Drama Series
- Golden Globe Award: Golden Globe Award for Best Television Series – Drama
- Producers Guild of America Award: Norman Felton Award for Outstanding Producer of Episodic Television, Drama
- NAACP Image Award: NAACP Image Award for Outstanding Drama Series
- TCA Award: TCA Award for Outstanding Achievement in Drama
- Satellite Award: Satellite Award for Best Television Series – Drama
- Daytime Emmy Award: Daytime Emmy Award for Outstanding Drama Series
- Critics' Choice Television Award: Critics' Choice Television Award for Best Drama Series
- Favorite Network TV Drama
- GLAAD Media Award for Outstanding Drama Series

Australian

- Logie Award: Logie Award for Most Outstanding Drama Series
- Logie Award: Logie Award for Most Popular Australian Drama
- Penguin Award

Canadian

- Canadian Screen Awards: Best Dramatic Series
- Gemini Award: Gemini Award for Best Dramatic Series

European

- British Academy Television Award: British Academy Television Award for Best Drama Series
- National Television Awards: Best Drama Series (UK)
