= Stefan Pleszczynski =

Canadian film and TV director, producer and screenwriter

- Born: Eastern Townships, Quebec, Canada
- Education: Concordia University; Simon Fraser University
- Occupations: Film/television director, film producer and screenwriter
- Years active: 1994–present
- Spouse(s): Bernadette Gogula (?–present)

Stefan Pleszczynski (born in Eastern Townships, Quebec) is a Canadian film and television director, producer and screenwriter.

== Career ==
Pleszczynski is an alumnus of Concordia University and Simon Fraser University. While at Simon Fraser, he won two awards at the Canadian Student Film Festival in 1984 for his experimental student short film The Dragon.

He was a location manager on the films Squanto: A Warrior's Tale (1994) and Johnny Mnemonic (1995) prior to directing his first mid-length film, The Old Man Who Wanted to Climb to Heaven (L'Homme perché), in 1997.

Pleszczynski's television credits include Da Vinci's Inquest, Intelligence, The Worst Witch, Weirdsister College, Sophie, 18 to Life, Flashpoint, Motive, Supernatural, Transplant, Sight Unseen and the American-Canadian adaption of Being Human.

Beginning with the second season of Transplant, he was also a producer of the series.

He has also directed the television films Live Once, Die Twice (2006), Circle of Friends (2006) and A Life Interrupted (2007), and the 2004 feature film On the River of Lost and Found (L'Espérance).

== Personal life ==
He currently lives in Montreal and is married to Bernadette Gogula, who was a collaborator on both of Pleszczynski's theatrical films.

== Awards ==
Award	Date of ceremony	Category	Work	Result	Ref(s)
Canadian Screen Awards	2015	Best Direction in a Dramatic Series	Motive	Nominated	
Canadian Screen Awards	2022	Best Dramatic Series	Transplant with Jocelyn Deschênes, Bruno Dubé, Joseph Kay, Tara Woodbury, Virginia Rankin, Josée Vallée, Adam Barken	Won	
Canadian Screen Awards	2023	Best Dramatic Series	Transplant with Joseph Kay, Bruno Dubé, Jocelyn Deschênes, Josée Vallée, Rachel Langer, Sarah Timmins	Nominated	
Canadian Screen Awards	2024	Best Dramatic Series	Transplant with Joseph Kay, Bruno Dubé, Jocelyn Deschênes, Josée Vallée, Rachel Langer, Sarah Timmins	Nominated	
Canadian Student Film Festival	1984	Best Experimental Film	The Dragon	Won	
Canadian Student Film Festival	1984	Best Soundtrack	The Dragon with Simon Purcell	Won	
Directors Guild of Canada	2013	Best Direction in a TV Series	Flashpoint: "We Take Care of Our Own"	Nominated	
Directors Guild of Canada	2022	Best Direction in a Dramatic Series	Transplant: "Guardrail"	Nominated	
