= List of Motive episodes =

Motive is a Canadian police procedural drama television series that aired for four seasons on the CTV television network from February 3, 2013, to August 30, 2016. During the course of the series, 52 episodes of Motive aired.

== Series overview ==
Season	Episodes	Originally released	
Season	Episodes	First released	Last released
1	13	February 3, 2013	May 16, 2013
2	13	March 6, 2014	May 29, 2014
3	13	March 8, 2015	June 7, 2015
4	13	March 22, 2016	August 30, 2016

== Episodes ==
=== Season 1 (2013) ===
No. overall	No. in season	Title	Directed by	Written by	Original release date	Can. viewers (millions)
1	1	"Creeping Tom"	Bronwen Hughes	Daniel Cerone	February 3, 2013	1.23
Science teacher Glenn Martin (Joey McIntyre) is murdered in his Vancouver home by Tom Caron, a loner moonlighting as a thief who steals just for the thrill of it. Homicide Detectives Angie Flynn and Oscar Vega initially suspect Martin's adulterous wife Linda, but come to suspect that his death is more than just a crime of passion and set out to piece together the evidence.
2	2	"Crimes of Passion"	David Frazee	Dennis Heaton	February 10, 2013	N/A
High school student Tiffany Greenwood is killed by mayoral candidate David Jacobs (Noam Jenkins), who insinuates himself into the investigation in an attempt to frame Tiffany's boyfriend Kevin. Angie and Oscar set out to prove Kevin's innocence despite Jacobs' overzealousness only to learn the motive lies in a dark secret.
3	3	"Pushover"	Charles Martin Smith	Wil Zmak	February 17, 2013	1.01
Limousine driver Scott Hayward is killed by customs officer Ben Crewson (Scott Michael Campbell), who committed the crime in order to retrieve a sum of money from lawyer Randy Sprague (Vincent Gale). Angie and Oscar investigate the crime only to be drawn to a waitress who may hold a major piece of the puzzle.
4	4	"Against All Odds"	Bronwen Hughes	James Thorpe	March 3, 2013	0.93
High-powered lawyer Shawn Mitchell (Dylan Neal) is stabbed to death in his home by convenience store clerk Sarah Muller (Liane Balaban), who stole his wife's purse while fleeing the scene. Angie and Oscar attempt to determine if this was a burglary gone wrong while Sarah finds herself overwhelmed by feelings of guilt.
5	5	"Public Enemy"	Sturla Gunnarsson	Katherine Collins	March 10, 2013	N/A
Health guru Jack Bergin (Cameron Bancroft) is killed by clothing store clerk Chloe Myton (Molly Parker), who breaks into his home and electrocutes him with a stun gun. Angie and Oscar investigate only to learn that the victim didn't always practice what he preached.
6	6	"Detour"	Andy Mikita	Dennis Heaton	March 14, 2013	N/A
Mortgage broker Eric Chase (David Julian Hirsh) is killed by Alcoholics Anonymous member Barry Ketchum (Aidan Devine), who committed the crime in a drunken rage. Angie and Oscar initially suspect the victim's ex-wife, but start to question everything they know when their superiors refuse to divulge information regarding a suspect with a dark secret.
7	7	"Out of the Past"	Kelly Makin	Daegan Fryklind	March 21, 2013	1.20
News shop proprietor Hank Cousineau (Chance Kelly) is killed by pediatric surgeon Monika Harper, who is struggling to conceal a dark past. Angie and Oscar refuse to believe the crime was committed by a local gang and set out to find the killer as Monika struggles to keep secrets from catching up with her.
8	8	"Undertow"	Sturla Gunnarsson	Daegan Fryklind	March 28, 2013	1.06
Post-graduate student Taylor Hollis is brutally murdered by contractor Charles Stanwyck (John Pyper-Ferguson). Angie and Oscar initially suspect restaurateur Vijay Rand (Raoul Bhaneja) after learning that the victim was secretly dating his daughter, but soon realize the real motive lies in a conspiracy that is close to falling apart.
9	9	"Framed"	David Frazee	James Thorpe	April 4, 2013	1.01
Art enthusiast Julia Conrad (Hilary Jardine) dreams of having her own art gallery one day, but Marion Rieder (Mary Pat Gleason) kills her. Marion's son Owen (Nicholas Carella) reports to the police that his antique gun had been stolen. Angie learns that a bullet from that gun was what killed Julia. The gun may also have emitted a minor blast and the killer's hands might be burned. Owen becomes a suspect when it is learned he had asked Julia on a date but was rebuffed. He confesses, but Angie believes he is covering for someone. Marion pleads for Owen's release and Angie takes him home. It is then she notices Marion's burned hand. Julia had bought an original painting from Marion, even though it was ruined when Marion drew a cat onto it. Marion learned the painting was actually worth a lot of money and shot Julia when she refused to return it.
10	10	"Fallen Angel"	Andy Mikita	Wil Zmak	April 25, 2013	0.84
Noel Barnett (Tony Nardi) is the priest who has kept his St. Rock's Church from financial ruin. Unemployed chef Felix Hausman (Dustin Milligan) kills him. Felix's father and prison inmate Krzysztof Woz (Marcel Maillard) pilfered $2 million in diamonds a long time go. Felix has believed his father to be alive all this time, as he has received postcards from him. He learns that his father was actually dead, and the diamonds were once buried at his grave. Finding no diamonds, Felix kills Barrett who told him that he was the author of the postcards and that he found the diamonds years ago.
11	11	"Brute Force"	Charles Martin Smith	Dennis Heaton	May 2, 2013	N/A
Mark "The Machine" Mason was a boxer who takes care of his family, including his wheelchair-using brother Joey. Mark is now dead, stabbed to death by Joey, who tells Angie and Oscar that he found his dead brother on the gym floor. In the past, Mark never listened to Joey's plans to increase revenue for their boxing gym, even after Joey's accident. The investigation into Mark's death is hampered when Joey goes on television and blames a street kid who hangs around the gym for Mark's murder. Mark had occasionally given the kid money. The kid eventually overdoses. Maggie doesn't believe the kid is their killer. Angie eventually notices the handles on Joey's wheelchair had been switched. Traces of Mark's blood are found on one. Joey killed Mark for being a quitter and never supporting his ideas.
12	12	"Ruthless"	Stefan Pleszczynski	Katherine Collins	May 9, 2013	N/A
While trying to find a motive in the murder of an executive assistant, Angie and Oscar discover a link between the killer and the victim that could uncover an even more deadly secret.
13	13	"The One Who Got Away"	David Frazee	James Thorpe	May 16, 2013	0.84
A teenage boy's murder forces Angie to confront her past in order to catch the killer.

=== Season 2 (2014) ===
No. overall	No. in season	Title	Directed by	Written by	Original release date	Can. viewers (millions)
14	1	"Raw Deal"	David Frazee	Dennis Heaton	March 6, 2014	1.24
Angie and Oscar investigate a suspected suicide victim, Kevin Carpenter (Shawn Roberts), who may have had some unwelcome help ending his life. Kevin had been methodically looking for someone before his death, and finding out for whom he was searching will lead the detectives to the motive. Angie's focus is compromised when Sergeant Mark Cross (Warren Christie) joins the team as the new commander. She has problems with Cross' appointment. Someone else should have gotten the job, and she and Cross have a ten-year undisclosed history. She refuses to let his presence push her out from the department.
15	2	"They Made Me a Criminal"	Sturla Gunnarsson	Sarah Dodd	March 13, 2014	1.45
A seemingly straightforward case of self-defense during a home invasion turns out to be more complicated than originally thought when a mother (Jennifer Beals) goes to extreme lengths to protect her drug-addicted son. Meanwhile, tensions flare when Cross asserts his authority and Angie pushes back.
16	3	"Overboard"	Mairzee Almas	Katherine Collins	March 20, 2014	1.39
Damian Cutter (Niall Matter), a former special ops soldier in Afghanistan, steals the identity of a buddy still stationed there. He flies to Vancouver and avenges the death of his sister, whom he believed had been drowned by her husband, Kurt Taylor (Carlos Bernard), in St. Lucia some years prior. Taylor remarried, but was in love with another woman. Instead of killing Taylor, Cutter murders the other woman, the person Taylor most loved. Meanwhile, more of Angie's past relationship with Cross is revealed. He was married at the time of their affair.
17	4	"Deception"	David Frazee	James Thorpe	March 27, 2014	1.46
Coroner Dr. Matthews (Corbin Bernsen) is murdered by a construction worker named Diane (Erica Cerra). Her husband, Brad Hitchens, was in jail and Matthews was testifying in his case. Dr. Rogers takes his place in Hitchens' trial, only to learn Matthews actually lied about the evidence and was testifying to send the innocent Hitchens to jail for a crime he did not commit. Matthews had been taking the law into his own hands, after his granddaughter drowned and nothing had been done to those responsible for her. Meanwhile, Hitchens gets killed in prison.
18	5	"Dead End"	Andy Mikita	Derek Schreyer	April 3, 2014	1.28
Eighteen-year-old Emily Williams (AJ Michalka), a senior at Queen's Cross Academy, is killed by fellow student Janine Boxton (Alexia Fast), younger sister of Emily's ex-boyfriend, Aidan Boxton. The Boxtons were like a second family to Emily, with Janine trying to emulate her as much as possible. Rumors had circulated that Emily was having a sexual relationship with a married teacher, which led to her recent attitude change. She broke up with Aidan and decided not to attend college with him the following year. Her attitude change is shown to be from getting pregnant, ultimately leading to her murder. Meanwhile, two potential office relationships arise, one between Cross and prosecutor Samantha Turner, and the other between Officer Sung and Lucas, who is married.
19	6	"Bad Blonde"	Sturla Gunnarsson	Dennis Heaton	April 10, 2014	1.22
Bartender Jake Daley is killed by web design owner Heather Williamson. Jake and Heather had grown close after he stopped a guy from groping her. Heather's friend Gordon (Jason Dohring) did not like Jake. Gordon's wife, Kim, stated he did not like any of Heather's boyfriends. After Heather kills Jake, she calls Gordon with his cell phone to show a connection. This, combined with Gordon purchasing items to help her dispose of Jake's body, makes him the prime suspect. However, Heather killed Jake after thinking he cheated on her and he then broke up with her. Gordon had caused her to think that way, not realizing she would kill Jake.
20	7	"Pitfall"	Fred Gerber	Katherine Collins	April 17, 2014	1.31
Angie and Oscar are called away from his father's wedding to what appears to be a skydiving accident. However, as the investigation proceeds, they realize it was a homicide. The victim was drugged with high levels of opioids immediately before his death. Clues indicate a compassionate killer in this challenging case. Meanwhile, Angie tries to regain Oscar's trust by sharing a sensitive file about a case she worked on with Sergeant Cross ten years ago.
21	8	"Angels with Dirty Faces"	Andy Mikita	Daegan Frykland	April 24, 2014	1.26
Peter Ward (Paul Campbell) is the home-care nurse for Olivia Dent, a woman with an auto-immune kidney disease. Her son James was found nearly dead after he made a 9-1-1 call of being assaulted. He is declared brain dead, but is kept on life support at the hospital. Olivia and James have been estranged for some months, even though she provided him with a business, a rehearsal space, on which he could earn a living. Voice recognition proves that the 9-1-1 call was not made by James himself. A situation at the hospital points to Peter as the perpetrator. Angie and Oscar must figure out why Peter did not initially kill James before he made the call, if the motive was purely to inherit Olivia's estate instead of James. Meanwhile, Brian, separated from his wife Mary, turns to Officer Sung for support. Also, the professional divide between Angie and Mark that occurred ten years ago begins to reveal itself.
22	9	"Abandoned"	TJ Scott	Wil Zmak	May 1, 2014	1.19
When the owner (Jennifer Irwin) of a popular diner is killed in a kitchen explosion, Angie and Oscar discover her controlling personality put her at odds with many people, including her son. The team learns that a former employee had something the victim was determined to fight for, even at the cost of her life. Meanwhile, Angie is asked to be a character witness for Sergeant Cross. Unsure of what to do, she shares the real truth about their past with Oscar.
23	10	"Nobody Lives Forever"	Jeremiah Chechik	James Thorpe	May 8, 2014	1.13
John Rivera, an immigrant chair-holder at an equestrian center, is killed after marrying into a rich lifestyle. Although his father-in-law is pretentious and his wife Jennifer has an alibi, neither of them killed John. His other wife, Isabelle, an immigrant nanny, kills him when she learns of his second marriage. It is also revealed that John had planned to kill Isabelle to cover up that part of his life. Meanwhile, prosecutor Samantha Turner confronts Angie about testifying, and Oscar sets a staff sergeant straight regarding Angie.
24	11	"A Bullet for Joey"	Andy Mikita	Paul Redford	May 15, 2014	1.35
Bryce Kovack owns and operates a garage with his brothers Brent and Donnie. The Kovacks live in the family home, with their younger sister Erin, who just returned home from dental hygiene school. Joey Dunkamp, a real estate agent for high-end properties, is found shot dead in his car. It is determined that he was not shot in the car, when the detectives later find the primary crime scene to be his trendy new office. Dunkamp was killed when fired upon at close range, but Betty also finds two bruises from shots from blanks also fired at close range. Joey was the type of person who gave and enjoyed favors to get what he wanted, personally and professionally, often coming close to scamming people. Evidence eventually leads to Donnie Kovack, but the entire family must be investigated. Meanwhile, Samantha asks Cross to convince Angie to testify on his behalf, which he is unwilling to do. However, Angie reluctantly gets involved in the case through other means.
25	12	"Kiss of Death"	Sturla Gunnarsson	Dennis Heaton & Thomas Pound	May 22, 2014	1.21
A best-selling murder mystery author (Enuka Okuma) dies from a rare but extremely potent toxin. Angie and Oscar must sort out fans from enemies. The investigation takes a turn when a prime suspect ends up the second victim. Meanwhile, Samantha pushes Angie for the truth about her past with Cross, and Angie receives a pleasant surprise. Elsewhere, Lucas struggles with his marriage.
26	13	"For You I Die"	Stefan Pleszczynski	James Thorpe	May 29, 2014	1.17
Prosecutor Samantha Turner is the murder victim. All the evidence points to Cross, who was also in a relationship with her. Refusing to believe he could be a murderer, Angie supports him but not everyone, including Oscar, agrees with her. Bloom considers suspending Cross. An old case from Angie and Cross' past also resurfaces, which may force them to reveal the secret they have hidden all this time.

=== Season 3 (2015) ===
No. overall	No. in season	Title	Directed by	Written by	Original release date	Can. viewers (millions)
27	1	"6 Months Later"	David Frazee	Dennis Heaton	March 8, 2015	1.28
After six months away from the job, Angie returns to investigate a high-profile case involving the murder of a socialite (Jessica Lowndes). After the motive is discovered, Angie cannot let the case go that involves Neville Montgomery (Victor Garber).
28	2	"Calling the Shots"	Sturla Gunnarsson	Sarah Dodd	March 15, 2015	0.86
Angie deals with Brian being primary on a case of a call girl. Angie has help from a surprising party regarding Montgomery.
29	3	"Oblivion"	Jeremiah S. Chechik	Karen Hill	March 22, 2015	1.15
Angie and Oscar investigate two murders, during which he has to pass his weapons recertification.
30	4	"The Glass House"	David Frazee	Thomas Pound	March 29, 2015	1.46
The homicide of a man is compounded by the abduction of his daughter; Angie continues to secretly investigate the Neville Montgomery file.
31	5	"The Suicide Tree"	Sturla Gunnarsson	Matt MacLennan	April 5, 2015	N/A
The murder of an armed robber leads the team to an unlikely killer - an unassuming florist. The team comes together to support Dr. Rogers.
32	6	"Fallen"	Bronwen Hughes	Julie Puckrin	April 12, 2015	1.34
The team questions the grey zone between law and justice as they investigate the murder of a street artist by his own protégé.
33	7	"Pilot Error"	Stefan Pleszczynski	Sarah Dodd	April 19, 2015	1.28
A stalking case turns deadly while Oscar is being evasive towards Angie.
34	8	"Reversal of Fortune"	Sturla Gunnarsson	Damon Vignale	April 26, 2015	1.44
As Angie, Oscar and Brian hunt for the killer (C. Thomas Howell) of a free-spirited tarot card reader, Oscar gets some unsettling news from the doctor.
35	9	"Best Enemies"	Andy Mikita	Karen Hill	May 3, 2015	1.05
A sleazy photographer is the prime suspect in the murder of his assistant; each of the detectives are interviewed about Angie’s methods. Meanwhile the team is interrogated by Internal Affairs.
36	10	"Purgatory"	Allan Kroeker	Matt MacLennan	May 10, 2015	1.24
A horrific murder at a surgical clinic leaves the detectives with two dead bodies. Angie thinks someone may be following her. Montgomery's lawyer finds the mole, as Angie discovers she's being stalked.
37	11	"The Amateurs"	Stefan Pleszczynski	Dennis Heaton	May 24, 2015	1.21
Amid a crime spree, the detectives must find the link in three separate homicides to catch a killer.
38	12	"Frampton Comes Alive"	Mathias Herndl	Damon Vignale	May 31, 2015	1.04
Angie and Oscar have a prime suspect in the murder of an insurance adjuster, the victim's wife, only to learn that she may be a victim of foul play herself.
39	13	"A Problem Like Maria"	Andy Mikita	Story by : Sarah Dodd; Teleplay by : Sarah Dodd & Dennis Heaton	June 7, 2015	1.22
Angie, Oscar and Brian set out to prove that Neville Montgomery murdered Maria Snow.

=== Season 4 (2016) ===
No. overall	No. in season	Title	Directed by	Written by	Original release date	Can. viewers (millions)
40	1	"The Vanishing Policeman"	Andy Mikita	Sarah Dodd & Dennis Heaton	March 22, 2016	1.28
Angie and Oscar adjust to his new role as Staff Sergeant and their changed work dynamic. The suicide of an officer, whom Angie and Brian worked with on a crime scene, is revealed to be a homicide and turns the team's investigation into a hunt for a cop killer.
41	2	"The Dead Name"	Kristin Lehman	Sarah Dodd & Dennis Heaton	March 29, 2016	1.18
Detective Mitch Kennecki (Victor Zinck, Jr.) tries to impress Angie after getting a promotion because of his father. The team investigates the murder of the transgender wife of a football star.
42	3	"Index Case"	Charles Martin Smith	Matt MacLennan	April 5, 2016	1.02
Joined by new detective Paula Mazur (Karen LeBlanc), the team investigates a death in a spa. The case takes a turn when Dr. Rogers discovers the body is infected with a mysterious disease that forces her into quarantine.
43	4	"The Score"	Mathias Herndl	Damon Vignale	April 12, 2016	1.19
During the investigation of the murder of an ex-con who may have returned to a life of crime, Angie notices Paula trying to ignore personal issues. Brian finds himself attracted to one of the witnesses in the case and must decide if he is willing to cross a line. Cross gets caught up in the ongoing investigation while working undercover.
44	5	"The Scorpion and the Frog"	Andy Mikita	Jennica Harper	April 19, 2016	N/A
A gruesome murder resembling a case that Paula previously investigated brings into question the guilt of the convicted killer. When Angie and Paula can't agree on a suspect, Oscar must mediate without playing favourites.
45	6	"Interference"	Sturla Gunnarsson	Julie Puckrin	April 26, 2016	1.25
The team investigates the murder of a suburban mother. When they learn the victim's ill child has been abducted, Angie and Paula desperately try to find him. Paula shares big news with Angie. Brian coerces an informant to lie in order to bolster Dr. Rogers's case and cannot bring himself to tell Oscar.
46	7	"The Dead Hand"	David Frazee	Dennis Heaton	July 5, 2016	0.87
A woman armed with a bomb threatens the department while asking for her son to be released from prison. Although he confessed to the murder of his sister, Angie agrees to take another look at the case.
47	8	"Foreign Relations"	Andy Mikita	Sarah Dodd	July 12, 2016	0.82
Interpol agent Jack Stoker (Tommy Flanagan) is brought into the investigation of the murder of a British college student.
48	9	"Remains To Be Seen"	Sturla Gunnarsson	Matt MacLennan	July 19, 2016	0.95
A video game designer is murdered and the only evidence is a pool of blood and several motion capture recordings. After learning that Stoker will be staying with the department temporarily as a liaison agent, he and Angie help each other with their respective assignments.
49	10	"In Plain Sight"	Andy Mikita	Damon Vignale	July 26, 2016	0.91
A woman is found nail-gunned to death. Angie embraces her relationship with Jack. Vega's frustrations force him to look for other options.
50	11	"Natural Selection"	Mathias Herndl	Jennica Harper	August 2, 2016	0.75
Liz Kerr, a member of a medieval LARP group, is murdered. Growing up in foster care, she lives as a free spirit and is dating several men. Who would have a motive for murder? Expect the unexpected.
51	12	"Chronology of Pain"	Rachel Leiterman	Julie Puckrin	August 23, 2016	0.96
A judge, who was once Angie's professor, is murdered by her clerk. Flynn and Lucas unearth a for-profit prison kickback scandal. Meanwhile, in the wake of Vega's retirement, both detectives plan changes.
52	13	"We'll Always Have Homicide"	Andy Mikita	Sarah Dodd & Dennis Heaton	August 30, 2016	0.92
