= Transplant (TV series) =

2020 Canadian medical drama series

- Genre: Medical drama
- Created by: Joseph Kay
- Starring: Hamza Haq; Laurence Leboeuf; Ayisha Issa; Jim Watson; Sirena Gulamgaus; Torri Higginson; Grace Lynn Kung; Sugith Varughese; Linda E. Smith; Kenny Wong; John Hannah
- Country of origin: Canada
- Original language: English
- No. of seasons: 4
- No. of episodes: 49

Production
- Executive producers: Joseph Kay; Jocelyn Deschênes; Bruno Dube; Rachel Langer; Randy Lennox; Stefan Pleszczynski; Virginia Rankin; Jeremy Spry; Sarah Timmins; Tara Woodbury; Josee Vallee
- Running time: 40 minutes
- Production companies: Sphere Media; Bell Media; NBCUniversal International Studios

Original release
- Network: CTV
- Release: February 26, 2020 – January 19, 2024

Transplant is a Canadian medical drama television series created by Joseph Kay, which premiered on February 26, 2020, on CTV. The series centres on Bashir "Bash" Hamed, a doctor from Syria who comes to Canada as a refugee during the Syrian Civil War, (Note: 2011–2024) and is rebuilding his career as a medical resident in the emergency department at the fictional York Memorial Hospital in Toronto.

In June 2020, the series was renewed for a second season, which premiered on January 2, 2022, on CTV, then March 6 on NBC.

In February 2022, the series was renewed for a third season by CTV and NBC. Season 3 premiered on September 23, 2022. Season three consisted of 13 one-hour episodes, and aired in fall 2022 and winter 2023.

In March 2023, the series was renewed for a fourth season by CTV. In September, Kay announced that the fourth season would conclude the series, noting that he had always planned it as a four-season arc. The fourth season premiered on October 6, 2023, and consisted of 10 one-hour episodes.

== Premise ==
Transplant follows Dr. Bashir "Bash" Hamed, a Syrian Civil War refugee and the newest resident at York Memorial Hospital, as he navigates through numerous obstacles to resume a career in the high stakes world of emergency medicine.

== Cast and characters ==
- Hamza Haq as Dr. Bashir "Bash" Hamed, an emergency medicine resident at York Memorial Hospital. Due to issues around recognition of foreign credentials, he was unable to get a job with a hospital in the pilot, and instead works as a line cook at a Middle Eastern restaurant; however, he soon has an opportunity to prove his mettle when a serious accident occurs at the restaurant, and his training and experience in a war zone enables him to save lives, using emergency medical techniques that can be performed without conventional medical equipment, before the first responders arrive.
- Laurence Leboeuf as Dr. Magalie "Mags" Leblanc, a driven emergency medicine resident with health and personal issues, who is struggling to stay on top of them in the high-stress environment of a hospital emergency room.
- John Hannah as Dr. Jedediah "Jed" Bishop (seasons 1–2; guest season 4), the gruff but compassionate Chief of Emergency Medicine at York Memorial.
- Ayisha Issa as Dr. June Curtis, a gifted trauma surgery resident who is emotionally guarded and struggles to open up; in the second season, she applies for and wins the job of chief resident.
- Jim Watson as Dr. Theo Hunter, a pediatric emergency medicine fellow, later an attending physician from Sudbury who struggles with having to be away from his wife and kids while he completes his residency.
- Sirena Gulamgaus as Amira Hamed, Bash's sister, who is twelve during season 1, and fourteen by season 3, episode 2.
- Torri Higginson as Claire Malone, the head emergency nurse, later nurse practitioner, who is also in a romantic relationship with Jed.
- Grace Lynn Kung as Vivian Barnes (season 1), the hospital's social worker.
- Sugith Varughese as Dr. Aajay Singh, a general surgery attending physician.
- Linda E. Smith as Dr. Wendy Atwater (seasons 1–2), the attending physician who is the residents' immediate supervisor.
- Kenny Wong as Arnold Wong, an emergency nurse.
- Mariah Inger as Rhoda DaSilva, an emergency nurse.
- Eddie G. as Lou, a security guard at the hospital.
- Eli Shankji as Saleh, Bashir's friend, a Syrian refugee working with Doctors Without Borders in Lebanon.
- Fayçal Azzouz as Khaled (seasons 1–2), Bashir's friend, a Libyan refugee claimant in Canada.
- Gord Rand as Dr. Mark Novak (seasons 2–4), the acting Chief of Emergency Medicine at York Memorial following Jed's stroke.
- Nora Guerch as Rania (seasons 2–3), an old friend of Bash's from Syria whom he had believed for several years to be dead.
- Atticus Mitchell as Jake Cooper (season 2), a medical student supervised by Theo.
- Rekha Sharma as Dr. Neeta Devi (seasons 3–4), Bishop's replacement as chief of York Memorial's emergency department.
- Ali Momen as Dr. Karim Esfahani (seasons 3–4), Bashir's therapist.
- Marianne Farley as Dr. Elizabeth Bergeron (seasons 3–4), the attending physician who becomes supervisor of the ER department, and Theo's girlfriend.
- Mark Rendall as Elliot (season 4), the doctor who sponsored Bashir and Amira to Canada.

== Episodes ==
Season	Episodes	Originally released	
Season	Episodes	First released	Last released
1	13	February 26, 2020	May 27, 2020
2	13	January 3, 2022	April 5, 2022
3	13	September 23, 2022	February 3, 2023
4	10	October 6, 2023	January 19, 2024

=== Season 1 (2020) ===
- Note: Premiere date in table reflects CTV premiere date.

No. overall	No. in season	Title	Directed by	Written by	Original release date	Canadian viewers (millions)
1	1	"Prestare Cura"	Holly Dale	Joseph Kay	February 26, 2020	1.31
When Bashir Hamed finds himself at the site of a tragic accident, his medical training takes over as he works to save the wounded.
2	2	"Tell Me Who You Are"	Holly Dale	Story by : Sarah Glinski; Teleplay by : Joseph Kay	March 4, 2020	1.27
Bash's experience as a doctor in Syria informs his unconventional approach as he joins the staff at York Memorial.
3	3	"Your Secrets Can Kill You"	Holly Dale	Rachel Langer	March 11, 2020	1.19
As Bash's future at the hospital hangs in the balance, he diagnoses a young patient with a rare disease that could have been prevented; Mags is faced with a case she cannot solve, as June tries to keep her personal life private.
4	4	"Saleh"	Alain DesRochers	Jenn Engels	March 18, 2020	1.21
Dr. Bishop puts extra pressure on Bash, while Theo feels powerless when something happens to one of his daughters back home; a patient puts Mags' moral convictions to the test and June tries to improve her social skills.
5	5	"Eid"	Alain DesRochers	Nikolijne Troubetzkoy	March 25, 2020	1.41
Bash does his best to celebrate Eid with his sister Amira, but she wishes they could continue the traditions they had back home; Theo treats a teenage patient who wants to avoid telling his parents why he's in the hospital.
6	6	"Trigger Warning"	Alain DesRochers	Lynne Kamm	April 1, 2020	1.28
An incident at work causes Bash to second-guess himself; Mags is inspired by a firefighter devoted to her work, even if it means risking her life on a daily basis, and June must learn to work with others.
7	7	"Far From Home"	Stefan Pleszczynski	Joseph Kay & Anar Ali	April 8, 2020	1.50
Bash wants to make things right with Amira after their lives are turned upside down once again.
8	8	"Birth and Rebirth"	Stefan Pleszczynski	Joseph Kay & Sami Khan	April 15, 2020	1.60
Bash and Amira settle into a new environment; while at the hospital Bash helps a worried couple expecting their first child; Dr. Bishop puts Mags to the test by personally evaluating her performance in the emergency department.
9	9	"Under Pressure"	Stefan Pleszczynski	Tamara Moulin	April 29, 2020	1.47
Bash provides medical care to a friend who is reluctant about treatment, while Mags has her hands full with a young woman who seems to be withholding information; Dr. Bishop offers Mags an incredible opportunity.
10	10	"Collapse"	Érik Canuel	Nikolijne Troubetzkoy	May 6, 2020	1.70
When an explosion takes place near the hospital, Bash runs toward the danger; when a schoolgirl is brought into the hospital in cardiac arrest, Theo does everything he can to save her.
11	11	"Orphans"	Érik Canuel	Lynne Kamm	May 13, 2020	1.43
Bash finds himself connecting with an unlikely patient, while Mags strives to find balance in her life; Theo has a difficult discussion with his wife, Melissa; June attempts to connect with a closed-off teenage patient.
12	12	"Relapse"	Érik Canuel	Rachel Langer	May 20, 2020	1.59
When a young mother addicted to opioids nearly dies, Bash must figure out whether she's using again, or if something else is causing her deadly symptoms; Mags tries to help a patient who isn't healing properly, while June is blindsided by her father.
13	13	"The Only Way Out Is Through"	Érik Canuel	Joseph Kay	May 27, 2020	1.68
Bash and Mags race to save a woman with mysterious symptoms who was nearly killed by their team's medical error; Theo tries to help a gravely ill teen and his family deal with the possibility that medical hope has run out.

=== Season 2 (2022) ===
No. overall	No. in season	Title	Directed by	Written by	Original release date	Canadian viewers (millions)
14	1	"Guardrail"	Stefan Pleszczynski	Mark Ellis & Stephanie Morgenstern	January 3, 2022	1.16
Bash's life is upended when he is reunited with a woman from his past.
15	2	"Jasmine"	Stefan Pleszczynski	Joseph Kay	January 10, 2022	1.06
Rania's arrival triggers unwanted memories for Bash. Mags can't win her new boss' approval.
16	3	"Sever"	Daniel Grou	Adam Barken	January 24, 2022	1.11
June gets the job as Chief Resident and learns that it's not as easy as she thought. Bash and the others fight for Dr. Bishop, and Bash learns some news from his new boss.
17	4	"Contact"	Daniel Grou	Tamara Moulin	January 31, 2022	1.09
Dr Bishop returns and apologizes for his past; Theo juggles his own personal life as well as his work life. Mags assaults a rude patient.
18	5	"Roads"	Chloé Robichaud	Anusree Roy	February 7, 2022	1.14
Theo has to figure out what's ailing a patient. Bash's friend is detained by the CBSA
19	6	"Liberty"	Chloé Robichaud	Julie Puckrin	February 14, 2022	1.25
Bash has to defend a patient from the police. Bishop learns some troubling news about his job. Mags helps out another staff member at the hospital. Theo struggles with his divorce.
20	7	"Control"	Bosede Williams	Sami Khan	February 21, 2022	1.16
Bash faces a decision that means life or death for a patient. Bishop is still looking for his successor. Mags can't decide between two departments.
21	8	"Scars"	Stefan Pleszczynski	Carmine Pierre-Dufour	March 1, 2022	1.12
A crow brings back memories for Bash. Mags and Bash get served for medical malpractice. June learns more about her dad's condition. Theo helps a patient with an uncommon ailment.
22	9	"Between"	Kim Nguyen	Tamara Moulin	March 8, 2022	1.09
Mags loses a patient. Bishop continues to look for a replacement. One of Theo's patients helps to discover an ailment in another patient.
23	10	"Shadows"	Kim Nguyen	Rachel Langer	March 15, 2022	1.10
The power goes out in the hospital, and everyone scrambles to help the best they can. Bash performs an amputation in the dark. June's father dies. Mags visits her childhood doctor, and Theo helps a child with heatstroke.
24	11	"Locked"	Stefan Pleszczynski	Adam Barken	March 22, 2022	1.18
Bash and Amira go on a trip together.
25	12	"Saviours"	Stefan Pleszczynski	Rachel Langer	March 29, 2022	1.04
Bash saves a man who is hit by a car after storming off a bus. Dr. Bishop and Dr. Novak start accepting that they work together. Theo goes above and beyond for a patient.
26	13	"Free for What"	Stefan Pleszczynski	Joseph Kay	April 5, 2022	1.10
Tensions run high as Bash tries to convince Bishop not to resign. Mags makes a career-changing decision, and Theo is involved in an accident.

=== Season 3 (2022–23) ===
No. overall	No. in season	Title	Directed by	Written by	Original release date
27	1	"Fracture"	Stefan Pleszczynski	Joseph Kay	September 23, 2022
The new chief of the ED is on scene when a worker falls while working on wires. Bash disagrees with the new ED chief over a patient with DID. Theo returns to the ED after the helicopter crash he was involved in at the end of season 2, and Mags is still adjusting to her new position in cardiology.
28	2	"Baggage"	Stefan Pleszczynski	Rachel Langer	September 30, 2022
When Bash meets Mags' parents for the first time over dinner, Mags' dad chokes, only for Bash to save him using the Heimlich Manoeuvre. Theo helps a woman who is afraid of needles, and she later accuses him of assault. Claire is overseeing a new nurse, who is very ambitious when it comes to patient justice. Bash helps a man who is intersex and has ovarian cysts. The new medical director opens up a little more to her staff.
29	3	"Hospital Beige"	Stefan Pleszczynski	Shelley Eriksen	October 7, 2022
Bash struggles with Canadian sanctions against sending money to his friend Saleh in Syria. Bash also has to work with a patient who took a controlled dose of ketamine. June works with Dr. Singh in the Trauma OR while Dr. Novak is away. She also offers to send the money to Saleh for Bash. A patient of Theo's returns and is denied a kidney transplant.
30	4	"Multiple Choices"	Wiebke von Carolsfeld	Joseph Kay & Ahmad Meree	October 14, 2022
While starting his dual residency in trauma surgery, Bash must make some difficult decisions. Bash takes his Canadian Citizenship Test. Mags must determine whether her boss really cares about the results of their research or the fame from it. Theo and Arnold help a patient who has a swastika tattoo on his chest. Theo reaches out to the woman who claims he assaulted her. Mags has an arrhythmia in her heart.
31	5	"Nadir"	Kim Nguyen	Rachel Langer & Abul Malik	October 21, 2022
A patient of Bash's brings back some unwanted memories. Mags recovers from her arrhythmia and requests Dr. Devi let her return to work as an ER doctor. Theo helps a patient's father deal with his son's condition. June gets answers about Shay's whereabouts. Bash asks for help.
32	6	"Audition"	Sharon Lewis	Tamara Moulin	October 28, 2022
Amira auditions for a school and forges Bashir's signature to do so. A diabetic patient's son gets crushed between two vehicles after storming out of the hospital, and it's up to Bash and Mags to save him. Theo apologises for the crash. Amira runs away.
33	7	"Work to Rule"	Sharon Lewis	Rachel Langer & Kinana Issa	November 11, 2022
Struggling with the burden of increased patient services from Dr. Devi's changes, the nurses begin work to rule job action. Bash reels from Amira's decision to run away, reluctantly allowing her to stay with Rania. Mags treats a highly sensitive patient.
34	8	"And So it Goes"	Éric Tessier	Laura Good	November 18, 2022
Bash attends his citizenship interview, where he finds himself recalling his painful past in Syria as his life is scrutinized. Theo needs Bash's help with a young patient who fears deportation if social services discover his family is undocumented. Mags helps a recovering addict who swallowed her keys.
35	9	"Rumination"	Éric Tessier	Tamara Moulin	December 2, 2022
Bash's psychiatrist suggests an unexpected form of therapy. Mags gets evicted and meets an old patient who holds a grudge. Theo makes some questionable choices with a patient's mother. June's personal and professional worlds collide.
36	10	"Unstuck in Time"	Wiebke von Carolsfeld	Carmine Pierre-Dufour	January 13, 2023
Bash and Amira finally become Canadian citizens, but Amira's invitation for Mags to accompany them on a trip to New York strains Bash and Mags' relationship when Mags reproaches his self-sabotaging insecurity. Theo struggles with decisions on treating an activist patient. Bash tries saving a couple whose wedding was waylaid by gunfire but disagrees with Dr. Novak's decisions. Mags' demanding teen patient needs birth control and June struggles with an old habit.
37	11	"A Sort of Homecoming"	Peter Stebbings	Joseph Kay	January 20, 2023
A software glitch takes down the emergency department; Bash explores a new terrain by working at a refugee camp in Lebanon; Mags searches for a new cardiologist; June is fed up with her bosses; Theo attempts a stable dating life.
38	12	"Tariq"	Stefan Pleszczynski	Joseph Kay & Rachel Langer	January 27, 2023
In Lebanon, Bash assists with a cholera outbreak and an individual patients, before meeting his old friend Tariq, who had once betrayed and caused Bash to be arrested and detained in Syria. Mags finds a cardiologist who suits her needs for treatment. June is asked to oversee the euthanasia of a doctor with a terminal condition. Theo deals with Dr. Bergeron being promoted over him and her ambivalence with continuing her relationship with him while intending to stay married to her estranged husband.
39	13	"The Luxury of Memory"	Stefan Pleszczynski	Joseph Kay & Rachel Langer	February 3, 2023
Bash returns to Canada and decides not to continue his surgical residency. June decides to support Dr. Devi for Mags, which brings her in conflict with Dr. Novak. Theo witnesses a devastating event and is warned that he may lose his medical licence for violating a previous patient's privacy against her wishes. In the past, Bash makes the decision to board a smuggler's boat with Amira in hopes of a future away from refugee camps.

=== Season 4 (2023–24) ===
No. overall	No. in season	Title	Directed by	Written by	Original release date
40	1	"Crete"	Stefan Pleszczynski	Joseph Kay & Rachel Langer	October 6, 2023
Bash and Mags learn they will be competing for the sole ER fellowship position when Dr. Devi decides to hire only one graduating resident to allocate funds for more nurses. June, now a fully qualified doctor, sees her mentor in a new light, while struggling with authority in the trauma OR. Theo sees patients virtually while suspended from the hospital, but longs for action. In the past, Bashir and Amira are detained at a refugee hospital in Crete, where Elliot, a Canadian doctor, suggests they immigrate to Canada.
41	2	"Sinkhole"	Stefan Pleszczynski	Joseph Kay & Kinana Issa	October 13, 2023
Bash jumps into a sinkhole to save a trapped pedestrian. While attempting to contain a potential outbreak at the hospital, Mags faces the possibly of an impending heart transplant for herself. June clashes with Novak in the trauma OR. Theo does whatever it takes to help a boxer with severe chest pain. Claire is having trouble adjusting after a past assault.
42	3	"Home"	Stefan Pleszczynski	Joseph Kay & Rachel Langer	October 20, 2023
Bash tries to reconnect with Elliot, after parting from his family abruptly years earlier. Bash and Mags fall into friendly competition at work in hopes of proving to Dr. Devi who should be hired for the fellowship. June tries group therapy for her self-harm issues. Theo faces a tribunal in hopes of getting his job back.
43	4	"Decisions"	Chloé Robichaud	Joseph Kay & Rachel Langer	October 27, 2023
Devi decides between Bash and Mags. Bash helps a young single father with nowhere else to turn, but is forced to confront the consequences of his impulsive actions. June and Novak take different approaches with a resident. Theo treats a teen patient with a connection close to home. Mags receives news that a donor heart is available and a perfect match.
44	5	"Heart"	Jeanne Leblanc	Rachel Langer & Ahmad Meree	November 3, 2023
After Mags reveals she will have a heart transplant, Bash finds himself losing track of his memory at work. June treats a patient whose phobia prevents him from surgery. Theo clashes with a protective family doctor while trying to help a returning young patient. Claire looks for help but finds Devi stretched thin.
45	6	"Fever Dream"	Caroline Labrèche	Joseph Kay & Rachel Langer	November 17, 2023
Mags undergoes transplant surgery and copes with the aftermath aided by her family and Bash. Bash balances personal and professional stress. June confronts Novak's self-sabotaging behaviour, while admitting she wants stability to start a family of her own. Theo navigates a visit from his father and thwarts Liz's attempt to meet his family.
46	7	"Torn"	Samir Rehem	Joseph Kay & Rachel Langer	November 24, 2023
Bash turns down a promising position at another hospital, while assisting a doctor in a remote location. Mags returns to York Memorial and confronts Claire about her mental health challenges alongside Devi and other colleagues. Theo is frustrated with Devi's lack of trust in him as he fights to help a patient.
47	8	"All I Have Is How I Feel"	Stefan Pleszczynski	Joseph Kay & Rachel Langer	January 5, 2024
June accepts a job offer in Cleveland, but Mags wonders if June is running away from personal issues. When Liz calls out Theo for breaking rules again to help patients, Theo is confronted with the idea he should reconsider becoming a family physician. As his residency is ending, Bash contemplates opening a clinic instead of looking for a stable position. He and Mags support each other while treating a couple glued together, but must face the fact Mags' body is rejecting her heart transplant.
48	9	"Who Is Mags?"	Stefan Pleszczynski	Joseph Kay & Rachel Langer	January 12, 2024
The loss of Mags affects her friends at York Memorial and they are reunited with Dr. Bishop at her funeral. Bash keeps recalling the day he met Mags and is consoled by Dr. Bishop after Bash confesses he felt he didn't deserve the relationship he had with Mags. June recruits Novak to help a patient who was injured in an accident after trying to abandon his infant daughter at the hospital, but is furious that Novak has finally agreed to become co-chief of the trauma OR as she still intends to go to Cleveland. Theo admits to his father his fears that he's in the wrong place in his life again. Claire renews her relationship with Bishop. Dr. Devi offers Bash an opportunity to stay at York Memorial.
49	10	"Never Too Late to Start Again"	Stefan Pleszczynski	Joseph Kay & Rachel Langer	January 19, 2024
The ER department responds to a gas leak, in the midst of the staff making decisions about their futures. Dr. Devi fights to remain as the head of the ER. After working together on a patient with uterine fibroids, Novak makes a case for June to stay and work with him in the trauma OR. Theo chooses to return to family medicine and move forward in his relationship with Liz. Inspired by Amira and his memory of Mags, Bashir decides to leave York Memorial and open a clinic dedicated to community medicine and public health.

== Production ==
Produced by Sphere Media, the series entered production in June 2019.

The series is primarily filmed in Montreal, with some limited location shooting in Toronto for establishing shots and other scenes which require a clear Toronto geographic marker.

Production on the second season was delayed by the COVID-19 pandemic in Canada, but commenced in February 2021.

== International broadcast ==
In May 2020, NBC acquired the U.S. broadcast rights for the series alongside another imported Canadian medical drama series Nurses from Global, with it set for December premiere; it premiered on September 1, filling a timeslot usually held by its own medical drama New Amsterdam (whose next season was postponed due to the COVID-19 pandemic). On December 11, 2020, NBC picked up the second season, which premiered on March 6, 2022. In July 2023, NBC originally announced season 3 would premiere on October 5, 2023, moving to Thursdays at 9 p.m. to fill the timeslot of Law & Order: Special Victims Unit. Law & Order: Organized Crime's fourth season was pushed back to mid-season of the 2023–24 season due to the 2023 Writers Guild of America strike and the 2023 SAG-AFTRA strike delaying certain productions in Hollywood, with the original Law & Order and SVU airing repeat episodes on Thursdays at 8 p.m. However, on August 28, it was announced that NBC pushed back the premiere date to October 12, delayed by a week as part of schedule changes for the fall lineup.

In New Zealand, the series is available for streaming on TVNZ OnDemand. In French Canada, the series airs on Vrak, simultaneously with its broadcast on CTV, and later on Noovo.

In November 2020, Sky Witness acquired the UK rights to the drama after striking a deal with international distributor NBC Universal Global Distribution.

In Brazil, the series is available for streaming on Globoplay.

In Malaysia, the series aired on PRIMEtime.

In Australia, the series aired on Nine Network, and is available to stream on 9Now.

In Brunei, the series aired on RTB Aneka

In Spain, the series is airing on Nova, female channel of Atresmedia.

== Reception ==
=== Critical response ===
John Doyle of The Globe and Mail wrote that the show's positioning of Bash as an immigrant struggling for acceptance in his adopted country set the show apart from other medical dramas: "The plot device that kick-starts the series—and Episode 1 sure comes with a kick—might seem ludicrous, but it gets your attention and signals what themes in Transplant are about to blossom. It's about the terror and frustrations that immigrants experience, trying to use their skills in a new country. Much is made of Bashir's knowledge and know-how being heightened by his experience working in a war zone with few resources. He can intuit medical problems and injuries faster than most of his colleagues. This does not, however, make him either distinctly heroic or arrogant. Given his situation, he's actually an extremely vulnerable man. He's not the irascible Dr. House, nor is he the spookily wise young virtuoso at the heart of The Good Doctor." He praised the series and Haq's lead performance in particular, ultimately concluding that "There are numerous medical dramas that move with a breathless, hectic pace and then stop for some romance or heart-warming moments. Transplant has some of that, but there is an astutely Canadian spin on the familiar. It gives grim articulation to the issues of immigration and the harried, under pressure immigrant experience. It's not entirely original, but certainly superior to the usual and disarmingly different."

In his year-end review of television in 2020, Doyle named Haq and Leboeuf as having given two of the year's best performances in Canadian television.

For etalk, Christine Estima also favourably reviewed many aspects of the show, giving special praise to its choice to avoid positioning its two female doctors, June and Magalie, as competitive rivals, instead presenting them simply as doctors who respect and support each other even if they don't always agree.

In advance of the show's American premiere, John Anderson of The Wall Street Journal reviewed it positively, calling it the best medical show currently airing on American television and potentially one of the better dramas ever aired by NBC in its history. The Hollywood Reporter observed that it was "not a hugely innovative or adventurous medical drama" and had a "heavy reliance on that House trope of a loved one bringing in a patient, only to have the loved one be the one with the actual medical mystery", but that Hamed was "an interesting main character" and Haq was a "solid leading man, giving Bashir a frazzled soulfulness, but never making him saintly". In conclusion, it was felt that "in a fall in which the broadcast drama slate is populated mostly by mediocre acquisitions and dismal holdovers from last midseason, there's value to an above average new show like Transplant."

The industry trade magazine Playback named Haq as Canadian television's breakout star of 2020.

=== Awards and nominations ===
Awards and nominations received by Transplant
Award	Year	Category	Nominee(s)	Result	Ref.
Canadian Screen Awards	2021	Best Dramatic Series	Transplant	Won	
Canadian Screen Awards	2021	Best Actor in a Drama Series	Hamza Haq	Won	
Canadian Screen Awards	2021	Best Makeup	Bruno Gatien, Marlène Rouleau, Mariane Simard for "Birth and Rebirth"	Nominated	
Canadian Screen Awards	2021	Best Photography in a Drama Program or Series	Pierre Gill for "Pilot"	Nominated	
Canadian Screen Awards	2021	Best Direction in a Drama Series	Holly Dale for "Pilot"	Won	
Canadian Screen Awards	2021	Best Writing in a Drama Series	Joseph Kay for "Pilot"	Won	
Canadian Screen Awards	2022	Best Dramatic Series	Transplant	Won	
Canadian Screen Awards	2022	Best Actor in a Drama Series	Hamza Haq	Won	
Canadian Screen Awards	2022	Best Actress in a Drama Series	Laurence Leboeuf	Won	
Canadian Screen Awards	2022	Best Supporting Actress in a Drama Series	Ayisha Issa	Won	
Canadian Screen Awards	2022	Best Casting in a Television Series, Fiction	Andrea Kenyon, Randi Wells, Jason Knight, John Buchan	Won	
Canadian Screen Awards	2022	Best Makeup	Bruno Gatien, Julie Brisebois — "Guardrail"	Nominated	
Canadian Screen Awards	2022	Photography in a Drama Program or Series	Pierre Gill — "Guardrail"	Won	
Canadian Screen Awards	2022	Editing in a Dramatic Program or Series	Annie Ilkow — "Contact"	Won	
Canadian Screen Awards	2022	Writing in a Drama Series	Joseph Kay — "Free for What"	Won	
Canadian Screen Awards	2022	Audience Choice Award	Transplant	Nominated	
Canadian Screen Awards	2023	Best Drama Series	Joseph Kay, Bruno Dubé, Jocelyn Deschênes, Josée Vallée, Rachel Langer, Stefan Pleszczynski, Sarah Timmins	Nominated	
Canadian Screen Awards	2023	Best Leading Performance in a Drama Series	Hamza Haq	Won	
Canadian Screen Awards	2023	Best Leading Performance in a Drama Series	Laurence Leboeuf	Nominated	
Canadian Screen Awards	2023	Best Casting, Fiction	Andrea Kenyon, Randi Wells, Jason Knight, John Buchan	Won	
Canadian Screen Awards	2023	Editing in a Dramatic Program or Series	Annie Ilkow — "Rumination"	Nominated	
Canadian Screen Awards	2023	Best Sound in a Fiction Program or Series	Mario Auclair, Sylvain Brassard, Christian Rivest, Guy Pelletier, Claude Champagne, Guy Francoeur, Gaël Poisson-Lemay, Simon Pelletier, Simon-Pierre Fortin Leclerc — "Rumination"	Won	
Canadian Screen Awards	2023	Best Writing in a Drama Series	Joseph Kay, Rachel Langer — "Tariq"	Nominated	
Canadian Screen Awards	2023	Best Writing in a Drama Series	Carmine Pierre-Dufour — "Unstuck in Time"	Nominated	
Canadian Screen Awards	2023	Audience Choice Award		Nominated	
Canadian Screen Awards	2024	Best Drama Series	Joseph Kay, Bruno Dubé, Jocelyn Deschênes, Josée Vallée, Rachel Langer, Stefan Pleszczynski, Sarah Timmins	Nominated	
Canadian Screen Awards	2024	Best Leading Performance in a Drama Series	Hamza Haq	Nominated	
Canadian Screen Awards	2024	Best Leading Performance in a Drama Series	Laurence Leboeuf	Nominated	
Canadian Screen Awards	2024	Best Supporting Performance in a Drama Program or Series	Ayisha Issa	Nominated	
Canadian Screen Awards	2024	Best Performance in a Guest Role in a Drama Series	Daniel Maslany	Won	
Canadian Screen Awards	2024	Best Makeup	Julie Brisebois, Bruno Gatien — "Crete"	Nominated	
Canadian Screen Awards	2024	Best Production Design/Art Direction in a Fiction Program or Series	André Guimond — "Sinkhole"	Nominated	
Canadian Screen Awards	2024	Best Visual Effects	Sébastien Chartier — "Crete"	Won	
Canadian Screen Awards	2024	Best Writing in a Drama Series	Joseph Kay, Rachel Langer — "Who Is Mags?"	Won	
Writers Guild of Canada	2021	Best Writing in a Drama Series	Lynne Kamm for "Triggering Warning"	Nominated	
Writers Guild of Canada	2021	Best Writing in a Drama Series	Joseph Kay for "Pilot"	Nominated	
Writers Guild of Canada	2021	Best Writing in a Drama Series	Tamara Moulin for "Under Pressure"	Nominated	
