= Louise Clark =

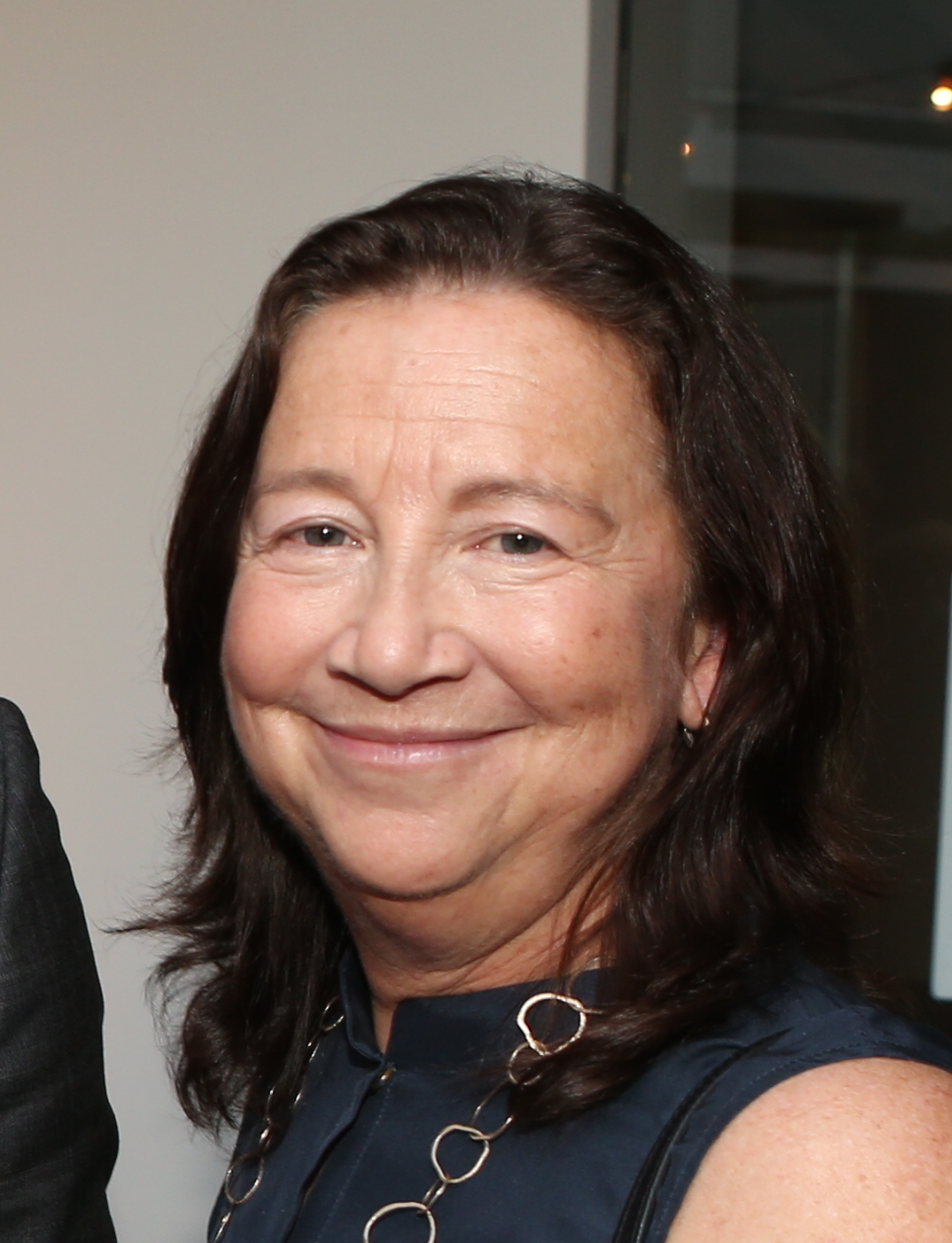
Louise Clark in 2014

Louise Clark is a Canadian businesswoman, producer, and broadcast executive. Her most notable work is attributed with the Canadian television show Corner Gas. She has worked on "television drama and comedy shows, feature films, movies-of-the-week, and documentaries."

== Career ==
Clark joined CTV in 1998. Prior to joining the network, she had served as head of the Ontario Film Development Corporation, had worked for the National Film Board, and was codirector with Jackie Burroughs, John Frizzell, John Walker and Aerlyn Weissman of the 1987 feature film A Winter Tan.

Clark assumed the position of producer; her most renowned work is on five seasons of the number one comedy Corner Gas. This popular Canadian TV show has six season and has won various awards, including nine Canadian Comedy Awards, and six Gemini Awards. Her production on this hit television show changed her life in a drastic way; it provided more freedom and more trust from the CTV executives. In turn this led to the production of three seasons of the critically acclaimed Robson Arms (2005–2008), as well as production on Flashpoint (2008–2009) and The Listener (2009-2014). With these four popular Canadian shows under her belt Clark decided to leave CTV on August 15, 2008.

After she traveled around Europe she began her own company called Lark Productions, established in 2010 in Vancouver, BC. Since the initial start-up the company has produced four seasons of the television show Motive, two seasons of The Real Housewives of Vancouver, and two seasons of Mom's a Medium.

== Television shows ==
Corner Gas (2004–2009) Producer
Robson Arms (2005) Producer
Flashpoint (2008) Producer
The Listener (2008) Producer
Defying Gravity (2008) Producer
Motive (2013–present) Executive Producer
Mom's a Medium (2013–present) Executive Producer
The Real Housewives of Vancouver (2012–present) Executive Producer
Emergency Room: Life + Death at VGH (2014) Executive Producer
High Moon (2014–present) Executive Producer
Gastown Gamble (2012) Executive Producer
