= Joseph Kay (writer) =

Canadian television writer and producer

Joseph Kay is a Canadian television writer and producer, most noted as a four-time Canadian Screen Award winner for his work on Transplant. He was the winner of the award for Best Writing in a Drama Series at the 9th Canadian Screen Awards in 2021 for the series pilot, and at the 10th Canadian Screen Awards in 2022 for the episode "Free for What".

Originally from Winnipeg, Manitoba, Kay first moved to Toronto, Ontario, to attend law school at Osgoode Hall. After deciding he did not want to be a lawyer he switched to studying television writing at the Canadian Film Centre, and got his first job as a writer on the television series This Is Wonderland.

He has since been a writer and producer on the television series The Line, Living in Your Car, Bomb Girls, This Life and Ransom, and has written episodes of Frontier and Republic of Doyle. Most recently, she signed an overall deal with Netflix.
