= Motive (TV series) =

Canadian police procedural crime drama television series

- Genre: Police procedural Drama
- Created by: Daniel Cerone
- Developed by: James Thorpe
- Starring: Kristin Lehman; Louis Ferreira; Brendan Penny; Lauren Holly; Roger Cross; Warren Christie; Cameron Bright
- Country of origin: Canada
- Original language: English
- No. of seasons: 4
- No. of episodes: 52 (list of episodes)

Production
- Executive producers: Daniel Cerone; Erin Haskett; James Thorpe; Lindsay Macadam; Louise Clark; Rob LaBelle; Rob Merilees; Dennis Heaton
- Production locations: Vancouver, British Columbia, Canada
- Running time: 40–44 minutes
- Production companies: Lark Productions; Foundation Features; Bell Media

Original release
- Network: CTV
- Release: February 3, 2013 – August 30, 2016

Motive is a Canadian police procedural television series that aired for four seasons on CTV from February 3, 2013, to August 30, 2016. The series premiere had 1.23 million viewers, making it the number one Canadian series premiere of the 2012–13 season.

== Premise ==
Motive is a police procedural drama set in Vancouver, British Columbia, following the investigations of working class single mother Detective Angie Flynn (Kristin Lehman). Each episode reveals the killer and the victim at the beginning; the rest of the episode details the ongoing investigation, the killer's efforts to cover up the crime, and, via flashbacks, the events leading to the crime. This format is similar to that of the TV series Columbo.

== Episodes ==
Season	Episodes	Originally released	
Season	Episodes	First released	Last released
1	13	February 3, 2013	May 16, 2013
2	13	March 6, 2014	May 29, 2014
3	13	March 8, 2015	June 7, 2015
4	13	March 22, 2016	August 30, 2016

== Cast and characters ==
=== Main ===
- Kristin Lehman as Detective Angelika "Angie" Flynn, a feisty Vancouver detective who investigates the motives of killers.
- Louis Ferreira as Detective and later Staff Sergeant Oscar Vega, Flynn's former partner and close friend.
- Brendan Penny as Detective Brian Lucas, originally a rookie detective, by the third season he has come into his own.
- Lauren Holly as Dr. Betty Rogers, the lead medical examiner.
- Valerie Tian as Officer Wendy Sung (season 2), the department's rookie uniformed officer.
- Roger Cross as Staff Sergeant Boyd Bloom (main cast season 1, recurring seasons 2–3), later Superintendent of Investigation.
- Warren Christie as Sergeant Mark Cross (main cast seasons 2–3, recurring season 4), Bloom's replacement as team Commander. Cross and Flynn had an affair ten years previously while he was married, which is revealed during an investigation of a case they worked on at the time.

=== Recurring ===
- Cameron Bright as Manny Flynn (seasons 1–2 and 4), Angie's teenage son who later leaves to attend school in order to become a chef.
- Laura Mennell as Samantha Turner (season 2), an attorney and Mark's love interest.
- Victor Garber as Neville Montgomery (season 3), a wealthy businessman.
- Richard de Klerk as Robert Montgomery (season 3), Neville's son who works for him.
- Luisa D'Oliveira as Maria Snow/Sonia Desesso (season 3), who also works for Neville and is engaged to Robert.
- Francis X. McCarthy as Henry Guenther (season 3), Neville's attorney.
- David Lewis as Sergeant Gavin Saunders (seasons 3–4), part of the Internal Affairs department.
- Marci T. House as Police Chief Jennifer Wells (season 4), who is constantly at odds with Oscar as head of Homicide.
- Victor Zinck Jr. as Detective Mitch Kennecki (season 4), who is briefly assigned as Angie's partner.
- Karen LeBlanc as Detective Paula Mazur (season 4), Angie's partner following Kennecki's dismissal from Homicide.
- Tommy Flanagan as Agent Jack Stoker (season 4), a London-based Interpol agent and Angie's love interest.
- Jaime Callica as Club Guy (season 1) and as Shawn Bailey (season 4)

== Production ==
On May 31, 2012, CTV ordered 13 episodes from Foundation Features and Lark Productions, to be filmed in Vancouver, British Columbia, from September 17, 2012, to February 26, 2013. The series premiere aired following CTV's broadcast of Super Bowl XLVIII.

On May 21, 2014, CTV ordered a third season of Motive, which premiered on March 8, 2015.

On October 5, 2015, CTV announced that Motive had begun production on the fourth and final season, with star Kristin Lehman directing one of the 13 episodes. Following the events of the third season, Detective Flynn finds herself without a car in the fourth. On April 5, 2016, CTV announced it has partnered with Chevrolet for the final season. Flynn decides on a 2015 Camaro.

== US broadcast ==
Starting in 2013, the series aired for two seasons on ABC in the United States. Following poor second season ratings, ABC did not include Motive on its 2015 summer schedule. In 2016, USA Network picked up Motive for its spring schedule. The third season premiered on April 1, 2016, and concluded on June 26, 2016. The fourth season began airing the following week on July 3, 2016, and concluded on September 25, 2016.

== Ratings ==
Viewership and ratings per season of Motive
Season	Timeslot (ET)	Episodes	First aired		Last aired		TV season	Avg. viewers (millions)
Season	Timeslot (ET)	Episodes	Date	Viewers (millions)	Date	Viewers (millions)	TV season	Avg. viewers (millions)
1	Sunday 8:00 pm (1–5); Thursday 9:00 pm (6–13)	13	February 3, 2013	1.23	May 20, 2013	0.84	2012–13	1.10
2	Thursday 10:00 pm	13	March 6, 2014	1.24	May 29, 2014	1.17	2013–14	1.30
3	Sunday 10:00 pm	13	March 8, 2015	1.28	June 7, 2015	1.22	2014–15	1.24
4	Tuesday 10:00 pm	13	March 22, 2016	1.28	August 30, 2016	0.92	2015–16	TBD
