= Never Saw It Coming =

- Poster
- Directed by: Gail Harvey
- Written by: Linwood Barclay
- Based on: Never Saw It Coming by Linwood Barclay
- Produced by: Marina Cordoni
- Starring: Emily Hampshire; Eric Roberts; Katie Boland; Shaun Benson; Tamara Podemski; Nick Serino
- Release date: December 1, 2017 (Whistler Film Festival)
- Running time: 83 minutes
- Country: Canada
- Language: English

Never Saw It Coming is a 2017 Canadian thriller film directed by Gail Harvey and starring Emily Hampshire, Eric Roberts, Katie Boland, Shaun Benson, Tamara Podemski and Nick Serino. It is based on the 2013 novel by Linwood Barclay, who also wrote the screenplay.

== Cast ==
- Emily Hampshire as Keisha Ceylon
- Eric Roberts as Wendell Garfield
- Katie Boland as Melissa Garfield
- Shaun Benson as Kirk Nicholson
- Nick Serino as Justin Taggart
- Tamara Podemski as Rona Wedmore
- Maria del Mar as Marcia Taggart
- Jeff Clarke as Dwayne Taggart
- Diane D'Aquila as Ellie Garfield
- Keegan Hedley as Matthew Ceylon

== Production ==
Principal photography began in Greater Sudbury in March 2017. Filming officially wrapped in April that same year.

== Release ==
The film made its world premiere at the Whistler Film Festival on December 1, 2017.

== Reception ==
Barry Hertz of The Globe and Mail awarded the film one and a half stars out of four and wrote, "Perhaps director Gail Harvey is the true author of this misfortune, with its rushed scenes and staging that only highlights, rather than deflects, the film's made-for-TV budget."

Norman Wilner of Now gave the film a positive review and wrote, "Adapted by Linwood Barclay from his own novel, it’s a Fargo-like swirl of misunderstandings, betrayals and reversals of fortune, with a streak of bitter humour underneath the mayhem."
