= The Lesser Blessed =

The Lesser Blessed may refer to:

- The Lesser Blessed (novel), a 1996 novel by Richard Van Camp
- The Lesser Blessed (film), a 2012 Canadian film, based on the novel
