= Adam Butcher =

Canadian actor (born 1988)

- Born: October 20, 1988 (age 37); Cambridge, Ontario, Canada
- Occupation: Actor
- Years active: 2001–present
- Website: www.adam-butcher.com

Adam Butcher (born October 20, 1988) is a Canadian actor. Butcher has an older sister, actress Mandy Butcher.

== Career ==
In 2004, Butcher starred as a teenage long-distance runner in the drama film Saint Ralph. His guest appeared on the Disney Original show Life with Derek in the episode "Show-Off-Tune", originally aired August 11, 2007, the episode "Allergy Season", originally aired June 16, 2008, and the episode "Just Friends," appearing as the character of Noel.

In 2009, he appeared in Flashpoint in the episode "The Farm". He portrayed the main character in the 2010 film Dog Pound.

Butcher has also appeared in an episode of Falling Skies, a 2011 alien invasion TV series produced by Steven Spielberg and in three Republic of Doyle episodes as a boy named Dylan. In 2012, he played Darcy in the film adaptation of The Lesser Blessed.

He had a small role in the season 1 episode 1 of Bomb Girls as Pvt. Lewis Pine, who briefly courts Gladys Witham (and asks her to marry him) before shipping out overseas. His letters to Gladys show up in later episodes that causes grief between her and her "actual" fiancé James.

In 2014, he appeared in the Rookie Blue season 5 episode "Blink", as well as the web series Long Story, Short opposite Katie Boland.

He starred as Officer Jesse Calvert in the Canadian television show Played in 2013 and also appeared in the 2014 film Debug, which was written and directed by British-born Canadian actor David Hewlett.

== Filmography ==
=== Film ===
Year	Title	Role	Notes
2004	Saint Ralph	Ralph Walker	
2010	Dog Pound	Butch	
2011	The Bend	Jason Campbell	
2012	Mirror Mirror	Servant #2	
2012	The Lesser Blessed	Darcy McManus	
2014	Wolves	Deke	
2014	Debug	James	
2015	Regression	Brody	
2016	ARQ	Cuz	
2016	Unless	Ring Leader	
2021	We're All in This Together	Gord	

=== Television ===
Year	Title	Role	Notes
2001	Super Rupert	Rupert Patterson	6 episodes
2003	The Pentagon Papers	Robert Ellsberg - Older	TV movie
2005	Terry	Chad	TV movie
2005	Terminal City	Nicky Sampson	Main role
2006	Heyday!	Terry Fleming	TV movie
2006	ReGenesis	Jackson	Episode: "The Wild and the Innocent"
2006	Angela's Eyes	Mike	Episode: "Eyes of the Father"
2007	Across the River to Motor City	Dom	Episode: "Treat Her Right"
2007–2008	Life with Derek	Noel	3 episodes
2009	Hellhounds	Nikandros	TV movie
2009	Overruled!		Episode: "Role Play"
2009	Flashpoint	Danny	Episode: "The Farm"
2010	The Bridge	Ron Archibault	Episode: "God Bless the Child"
2010	Unnatural History	Gunnar Erickson	Episode: "Thor's Slammer"
2011	Republic of Doyle	Dylan	4 episodes
2011	Falling Skies	Farley	Episode: "Live and Learn"
2011	Combat Hospital	PFC Avery Jenkins	Episode: "It's My Party"
2012	Bomb Girls	Pvt. Lewis Pine	Episode: "Jumping Tracks"
2012	The Listener	Ben	Episode: "She Sells Sanctuary"
2013	Cracked	Jeremy	Episode: "White Knight"
2013	Played	Officer Jesse Calvert	Main role
2013	Long Story, Short	Andrew	5 episodes
2013	Murdoch Mysteries	Jake Barker	Episode: "Murdoch in Ladies Wear"
2014	Rookie Blue	Zack	Episode: "Blink"
2015	First Response	Dermot hayes	TV movie
2017	Reign	Injured Guardsman / Peasant	Episode: "A Grain of Deception"
2017	The Strain	Terkel	Episode: "Extraction"
2019	Coroner	Officer Dowell	Episode: "Confetti Heart"
2020	Trickster	Cop	Episode #1.3
2022	Murdoch Mysteries	Norman Bean / Edgar Rice Burroughs	Episode: "The Write Stuff"

== Awards and nominations ==
He was nominated for a Genie Award for Best Actor at the 26th Genie Awards in 2006 for Saint Ralph.
