= We're All In This Together =

We're All In This Together, a common expression of solidarity, may refer to:

== Music ==
- We're All In This Together, a 2017 album by Walter Trout
- "We're All in This Together" (High School Musical song), 2006
- "We're All In This Together", a Ben Lee song from the album Awake Is the New Sleep, 2005
- "We're All In This Together, a song by Old Crow Medicine Show from their self titled album, 2004

== Other uses ==
- The I Heart Revolution: We're All in This Together, a documentary film by Hillsong United
- We're All In This Together, a 2005 collection of short stories and a novella by Owen King
- "We're All In This Together", a catchphrase of Red Green
- We're All in This Together (film), a 2021 comedy-drama film directed by Katie Boland

== See also ==
- We're All Alone in This Together, a 2021 studio album by Dave
