= Anita Doron =

Canadian film director and writer

- Born: June 3, 1974 (age 52); Berehove, Ukrainian SSR, Soviet Union
- Occupations: Screenwriter, film director, film producer
- Children: 1

Anita Doron (born June 3, 1974) is a Hungarian-Canadian film director, screenwriter, producer, cinematographer, author, and a 2010 TED Fellow. Doron is best known for her 2012 film adaptation of the 1996 novel The Lesser Blessed, written by Canadian author Richard Van Camp.

== Early life ==
Doron was born in Transcarpathia, a region of the former USSR. Her family members were high altitude mountaineers and they often spent summers in the mountainous regions of Georgia and Armenia. Her mother is Jewish and her grandparents were Holocaust survivors. On her TED personal profile, Doron discloses that her parents' ideologies influenced her own way of life early on. She states: "My mother rejected the official truth handed down by the government and my father refused the reality accepted by the middle class, leading me to seek and witness alternative truths from an early age".

Before filmmaking, Doron's initial creative outlet was poetry. She wrote her first poem after a family trip to the Black Sea when she was five years old. Her short poem about the sea made a strong impression on her mother, which encouraged Doron to continue composing poetry. Doron joined a young poets' group led by a local author and her poems were published at local and regional levels. Doron became "one of the youngest published poets in the former USSR". In an interview with TED Blog, Doron explains that one of her published poems was criticized because readers did not believe that a child composed it. She eventually stopped composing poems to focus on filmmaking. She told a reporter: "I don't write poetry anymore but, to me, filmmaking is poetry."

Doron considers her shift from poetry writing to filmmaking a "natural transition". While her poetry style was very visual to begin with, she had been experimenting with images from an early age because her father was an amateur photographer. Doron made her first film when she was 12 years old with the help of a friend and the friend's father's Super 8 camera. Doron's subject was the man-made "Verke" river that ran through the city she was born in. This river was so polluted by toxic waste that the residents of the city were no longer able to swim in it. Doron and her friend attempted to document how it was being polluted, as well as, the community's thoughts on the subject, but the only people who cooperated with the teens were drunks roaming the banks of the river. Doron was eventually summoned to the city's deputy mayor's office where she was advised to abandon her project or her parents would lose their jobs. However, her mother and father supported her project and urged her to complete it. She eventually had the prints developed, but when they returned from the lab, the negatives were clear. In a blog post on her personal website, Doron explains that she does not think that her film was ruined by the "office of the deputy mayor," but because of problems she had with the exposure. Nevertheless, this experience impacted Doron because she realized that her project had frightened those in positions of power. She states: "There was no turning back after that, because I saw how powerful filmmaking can be". Her family was given a permission to migrate to Israel due to the fact they were Jewish. She settled there for a short time before moving to Toronto.

== Education and personal life ==
At Ryerson University, Doron studied film and enrolled in courses such as film theory, cinematography, scriptwriting, producing, and directing. In her last year, she obtained an internship with Serendipity Point Films. During her internship, she worked as an Art Department research assistant on Atom Egoyan's 2002 film Ararat.

In university, Doron was awarded two Norman Jewison Filmmaker Awards for her class assignments. One of the projects was her thesis film Simulacrum, which she wrote and directed. This short film also won Best Student Film at the International Festival of Cinema and Technology in 2002 and was part of the Official Selection at Sprockets Toronto International Film Festival For Children, Cleveland International Film Festival, and Leeds Underground Film Festival.

Doron has one son, who was born in 2011.

== Career ==
=== Film ===
Following her graduation from Ryerson University in 2001, Doron produced her first short film Not a Fish Story (2002). She wrote, as well as, directed the short and garnered the funds to produce it from the Ontario Arts Council. The short was screened at the Toronto International Film Festival, Les Rendez-Vous Du Cinema Québécois, Taos Talking Pictures, Women's Film Festival in Vermont, and the Sherbrook Short Film Festival. Not a Fish Story was also nominated for the Best Short 2003 Banff Rookie Award and won third place in the Best Comedy category at ZoieFest 2003.

In 2004, Doron directed her second short film Elliot Smelliot (2003). The short film was financed by the Ontario Media Development Corporation and was an official selection at multiple film festivals including the Toronto International Film Festival, Cinefest Sudbury, and the Vancouver International Film Festival.

Between 2005 and 2009, Doron directed multiple music videos in collaboration with TWOTHREEFIVEFILMS, a film production company based in Toronto. In 2005, she directed the music videos for Canadian singer-songwriter Sarah Harmer's 2005 singles "I Am Aglow" and "Oleander". In 2006, she directed music videos for The Miniatures' "Actors and Soldiers" and Theresa Sokyrka's "Waiting Song" and "Sandy Eyes". A year later she directed Prairie Oyster's "One Kiss". Lastly, in 2009, she directed and crafted the illustrations for Octoberman's "Trapped in the New Scene". In a blog post, Doron explained that the illustrations were based on a fairy-tale she had written in her childhood about aliens. The subsequent animation of these images was executed by animators at Pixalite.

In 2006, Doron released her first feature film The End of Silence. Acting as screenwriter, director, and cinematographer, she shot the film in a "guerilla style" over the course of 52 days with a very small crew and budget. Doron wrote the script based on the story of one of her friends, "a former ballerina at the Kirov Ballet, American Ballet Theatre, and Broadway". Casting Sarah Harmer in a key supporting role, Doron cites this film as "the beginning of [her] love for non-traditional feature filmmaking with non professional actors". The End of Silence was screened at multiple film festivals including the Kingston Film Festival, Flint Festival, NXNE Film and Music Festival, and the Focus Niagara Film Festival. The film also won many awards in 2006, such as Best Feature at the Canadian Filmmakers Festival, Best Foreign Film at the Tahoe/Reno Film Festival, and Best in Show at the Female Eye Film Festival.

The Canadian Film Centre Media Lab recruited Doron in 2007 to work on Late Fragment, a project developed within the institution's Interactive Narrative Feature Program. This project was co-produced by the Canadian Film Centre (CFC) and the National Film Board of Canada (NFB) and was led by Ana Serrano from the CFC and Anita Lee from the NFB. Working in collaboration with two other filmmakers (Daryl Cloran and Mateo Guez), Doron wrote and directed one of the three parts of Late Fragment. Late Fragment is cited as "North America's first interactive feature film". The three filmmakers drew inspiration for the story by attending "a restorative justice process in Montreal". After deliberating, they reconvened at a later date to present their ideas and establish connections between the various storylines. Late Fragment was screened at the Toronto International Film Festival and the Future of Cinema Salon during the 2008 Cannes Film Festival.

In 2009, Doron worked on three short documentaries in collaboration with City Sonic. The productions she directed were Tony Dekker (Great Lake Swimmers) at the Subway, Sebastian Grainger at El Mocambo and Damian Abraham (Fucked Up) at Rotate This. Tony Dekker (Great Lake Swimmers) at the Subway premiered worldwide at the Toronto International Film Festival.

The following year, Doron released her second feature film Europa, East (2010). Doron was credited as the producer, writer, director, and cinematographer. Like The End of Silence, Europa, East was another film shot using guerilla tactics. Doron cast her cousin in the lead role and saw this film as an opportunity to experiment "on tiny Arts Council funding". The film premiered at the International Film Festival Rotterdam in 2010.

In 2012, Doron completed The Lesser Blessed. After reading the Richard Van Camp novel, Doron chose to write the screenplay for The Lesser Blessed because she was interested in the idea of a person alienated and living on the margins of society. Doron had begun adapting a screenplay for the book in 2008, and in preparation for the film, she travelled to the Northwest Territories to research the habits and lives of the First Nations people living there. Doron visited Van Camp's hometown, Fort Smith, and stayed there for a month to write the screenplay. After completing the screenplay, Doron had trouble finding a company to fund the project. In an interview with TED Blog she explains:

People would question, 'Why are you making a story about a First Nations kid?" And I would say, "Why wouldn't I?" I love the story, I understand the world and I think it's one of the most original characters in Canadian literature I've come across. He happens to be Native. I identify with him because of who he is.

The project was eventually funded by Telefilm Canada through the Canada Feature Film Fund in 2012. After receiving funding for the project, Doron returned to Fort Smith for the casting process. Van Camp's hometown was the last stop on a five-day trip where Doron visited various Native communities in search of the boy who would play Larry Sole, the main character. Doron finally cast Joel Evans in the lead role. She states:

On the very last day, as we were leaving and I was considering some kids for call-back, I saw this kid in the hallway cracking jokes and looking exactly the way I had envisioned this character in my head for six years. He didn't bother coming to the audition because he had a math test and better things to do.

The film premiered at the 2012 Toronto International Film Festival. In 2015, it was announced that Doron would be adapting the screenplay for the 2017 animated feature The Breadwinner.

=== TED fellowship ===
Doron was a TED fellowship recipient in 2010. During her year-long mandate, she worked on a film called Talk Derby to Me with other TED fellows, including Jessica Green. After her mandate, she participated in a conference in Berlin for the TEDBerlin Salon in 2014. Doron's portion of the conference took place at Wiesenburg, an abandoned asylum. There, she set up an "experiential installation about memory, dislocation, and the fuzziness of one's defined inner borders". She also helped to organize independent events for TEDx in Belo Horizonte, Brazil.

=== Literary works ===
Doron released a graphic novella in 2012 entitled Lola Grimm and the Humanity Machine. Since 2014, she has been writing a science fiction graphic novel named Noli Timere in collaboration with Jessica Green, a former TED Fellow.

== Filmography ==
=== Feature films ===
Year	Film	Role
2002	Ararat	Research Assistant
2006	The End of Silence	Writer, Director, Cinematographer
2007	Late Fragment	Writer, Director
2010	Europa, East	Producer, Writer, Director, Cinematographer
2011	Mystico Fantástico!	Writer, Director, Cinematographer
2012	The Lesser Blessed	Writer, Director
2017	The Breadwinner	Writer
2023	Olivia y los misterios	Writer
2025	Maya & Samar	Director

=== Short films ===
Year	Film	Role
2001	Simulacrum	Writer, Director
2002	Not a Fish Story	Producer, Writer, Director
2004	Elliott, Smelliott	Director
2009	Tony Dekker (Great Lake Swimmers) at Spadina Subway Station Sebastian Grainger at the El Mocambo Damian Abraham (Fucked Up) at Rotate This	Director
2010	The Impresario	Writer, Director, Editor
2011	C'est Mimi!	Producer, Director, Cinematographer
2011	Seven Sins: Lust	Writer, Director
2012	Durga	Cinematographer

=== Music videography ===
Year	Artist	Video	Role
2005	Sarah Harmer	"I Am Aglow" "Oleander"	Director
2006	The Miniatures	"Actors and Soldiers"	Director
2006	Theresa Sokyrka	"Waiting Song" "Sandy Eyes"	Director
2007	Prairie Oyster	"One Kiss"	Director
2009	Octoberman	"Trapped in the New Scene"	Director and Illustrations

== Awards and nominations ==
In 2003, Doron was placed at number 7 on Wendy Banks' "Top 10 Canadians to Look Out For" in Now Magazine. In 2005, she won the Kodak New Vision Fellowship. Over the course of this program, Doron was mentored in the creative and business aspects of filmmaking by the renowned Canadian filmmaker Deepa Mehta and the co-president of Maple Pictures Corp., Laurie May. This fellowship was meant to prepare her for the Toronto International Film Festival.

In 2012, along with six other female Canadian filmmakers, Doron was honored for her "contribution to Canada's cinematographic heritage". The following year she garnered a Canadian Screen Award nomination for Best Adapted Screenplay at the 1st Canadian Screen Awards for The Lesser Blessed. However, she lost to Salman Rushdie.
