= Tamara Podemski =

Canadian actress (born 1977)

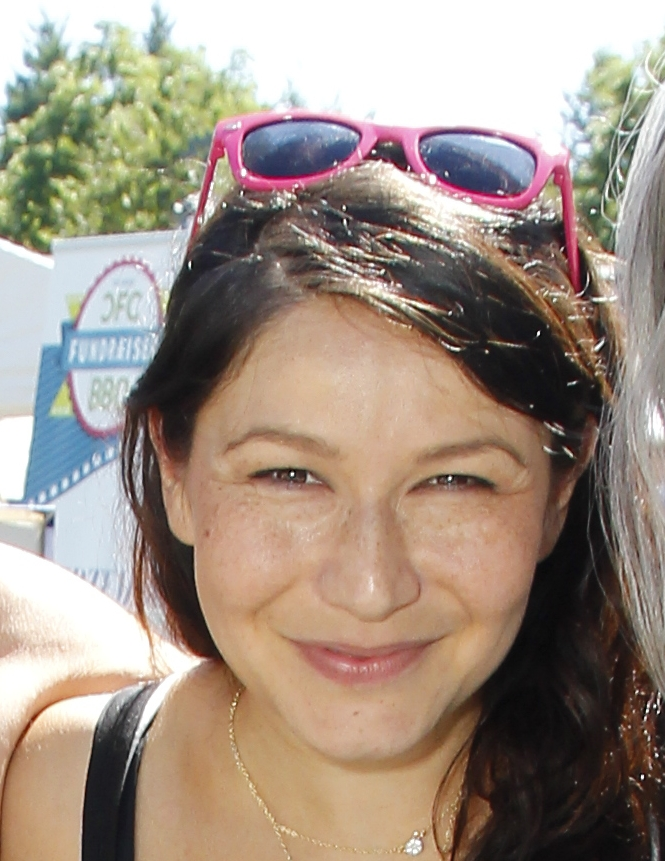
- Podemski in 2014
- Born: October 16, 1977 (age 48); Toronto, Ontario, Canada
- Occupation: Actress
- Years active: 1994–present
- Spouse: Jamie Thomas King
- Relatives: Jennifer Podemski (sister); Sarah Podemski (sister)

Tamara Podemski (born October 16, 1977) is a Canadian film and television actress and writer. She is known for her supporting role as Alison Trent in the television series Coroner, for which she won the Canadian Screen Award for Best Supporting Actress in a Drama Series at the 9th Canadian Screen Awards in 2021.

== Early life ==
Podemski was raised in Toronto where she attended Claude Watson School for the Performing Arts.

Her father is an Israeli Jew from Kfar Saba, and her mother is an Anishinaabe from the Muscowpetung band of First Nations people in Saskatchewan. Her paternal grandparents were from Poland, and moved to Canada after World War II. Her sisters, Jennifer Podemski and Sarah Podemski are also actors. All three sisters appear together in the FX series Reservation Dogs.

== Career ==
Podemski was a Canadian Screen Award nominee for Best Writing in a Factual Program or Series at the 8th Canadian Screen Awards in 2020, for her work on her sister's documentary series Future History.

She won a special jury award for dramatic performance at the 2006 Sundance Film Festival, and was an Independent Spirit Award nominee for Best Supporting Female at the 23rd Independent Spirit Awards in 2007, for her performance in the film Four Sheets to the Wind.

== Personal life ==
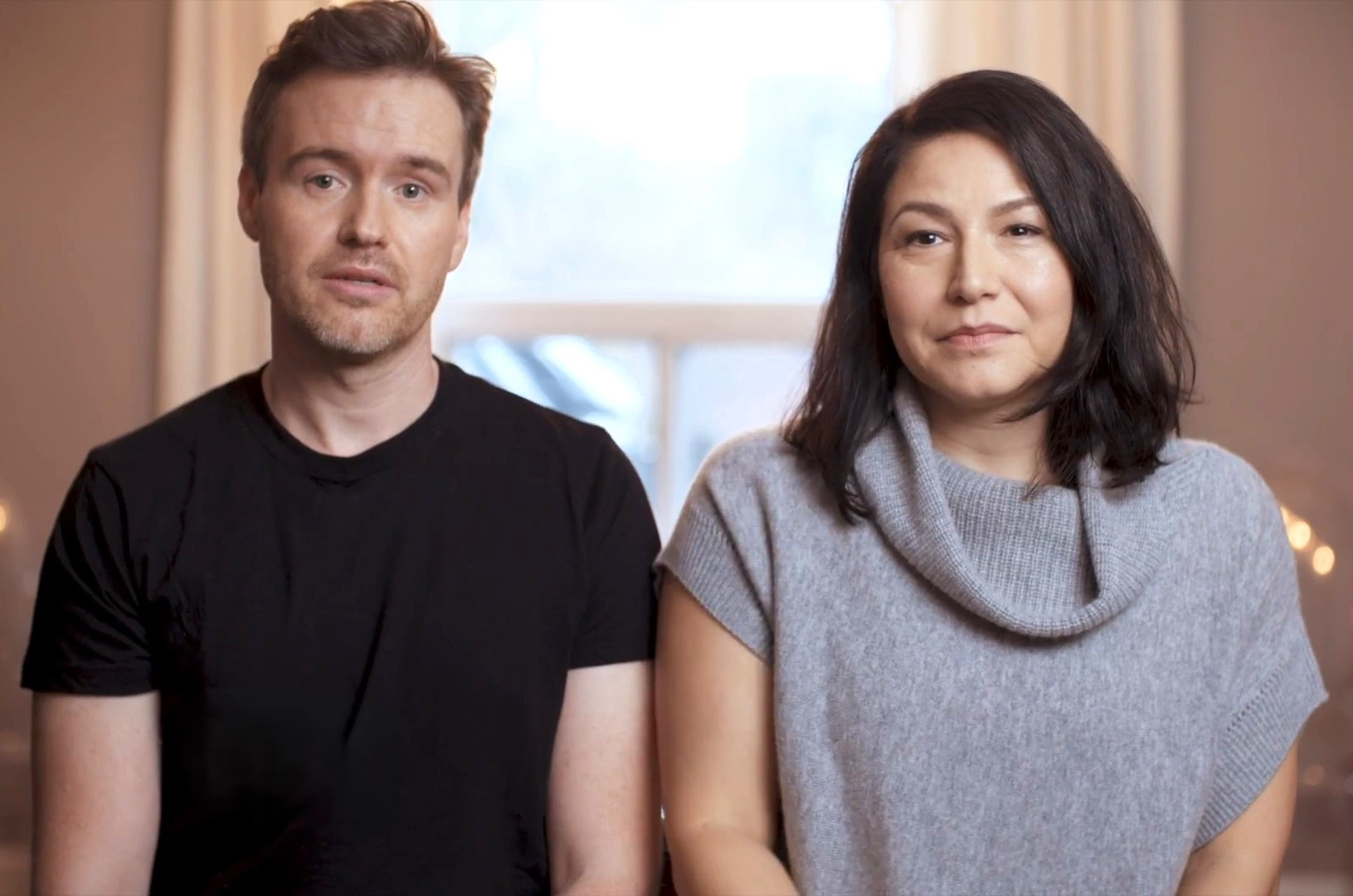
Jamie Thomas King with Podemski in 2019

She is married to British actor Jamie Thomas King, with whom she launched the Blackbird Productions studio. The studio's first release, a short film titled The Light Before the Sun, premiered in 2024.

In 2016, Podemski gave birth to their second child Benjamin, who died just five days after birth, in Bath. A coroner's investigation later determined that the death was due to brain damage caused when a hospital delayed Podemski's caesarean section. In September 2024, King announced that he was writing a screenplay adaptation of James Titcombe's book Joshua's Story: Uncovering the Morecambe Bay NHS Scandal, about Titcombe's own experience having a child die in infancy due to failures in the management of the National Health Service, which is planned for future release through Blackbird.

== Filmography ==
=== Film ===
Year	Title	Role	Notes
1994	Dance Me Outside	Little Margaret	
2000	Johnny Greyeyes	Rox	
2007	Four Sheets to the Wind	Miri Smallhill	
2012	The Lesser Blessed	Verna Sole	
2018	Never Saw It Coming	Detective Rona Wedmore	
2019	Guest of Honour	Detective Grove	
2023	Fancy Dance	Ricky	
2024	The Light Before the Sun	Amanda Wolf	Short film; also writer and producer
2025	Youngblood	Ms. McGill	
2025	Blood Lines	Pehmee	
TBA	The Temple		

=== Television ===
Year	Title	Role	Notes
1994	The Rez	Lucy Pegahmagabow	
1996-97	Ready or Not	Carla Slovinsky	
2003	Another Country	Jane Crowe	
2006	Indian Summer: The Oka Crisis	Deborah 'Chicky' Etienne	
2007	Rabbit Fall	Gabrielle	
2008	New Amsterdam	Young Lenape Woman	
2010	Making a Scene	The A.D.	
2012	Heartland	April	
2013	Cracked	Kaya Grey	
2019	Holly Hobbie	Dr. Manning	
2019–2022	Coroner	Alison Trent	
2020	Run	Babe Cloud	
2020	Unsettled	Tara	
2022–2024	Outer Range	Deputy Sheriff Joy	
2022	Ghosts	Psychiatrist Dr. Long	
2022	Reservation Dogs	Teenie	
2023	Essex County	Joy	
2023	Monster High	Coach Thunderbird	(voice)
2024	The Legend of Vox Machina	Uvenda	(voice)
2025	Murderbot	Bharadwaj	
2025–2026	Saint-Pierre	Natasha Bourge	
2026	The Borderline	Erica Ross	
