= ARQ (film) =

2016 film

- Digital release poster
- Directed by: Tony Elliott
- Written by: Tony Elliott
- Produced by: John Finemore; Kyle Franke; Mason Novick; Nick Spicer
- Starring: Robbie Amell; Rachael Taylor; Shaun Benson; Gray Powell; Jacob Neayem; Adam Butcher
- Cinematography: Daniel Grant
- Edited by: Kye Meechan
- Music by: Keegan Jessamy; Bryce Mitchell
- Production companies: Lost City; XYZ Films; MXN Entertainment
- Distributed by: Netflix
- Release dates: 9 September 2016 (TIFF); 16 September 2016 (Worldwide)
- Running time: 88 minutes
- Countries: United States; Canada
- Language: English
- Budget: under $2 million

ARQ is a 2016 American-Canadian science fiction action film directed by Tony Elliott. It was selected to be screened in the Discovery section at the 2016 Toronto International Film Festival. The film was released on Netflix worldwide on September 16, 2016. Robbie Amell plays an engineer whose invention causes a time loop during a home invasion. He attempts to save his former lover, played by Rachael Taylor, while learning who has targeted him and why.

== Plot ==
Renton wakes up beside his former lover, Hannah. Three men break into his bedroom and, when Renton breaks his neck while escaping, he wakes with a start where he was just a moment earlier. The men break in once again and bind him and Hannah to chairs in another room. Their leader, 'Father', says he represents a rebel group known as the Bloc and demands Renton surrender money or "scrips" that he had stolen from their rival organization, the Torus Corporation.

Father and the two other men, Sonny and Brother, leave to eat in another room and Renton is able to cut himself and Hannah loose. He explains that he built the ARQ, a working perpetual motion machine, while working for Torus and then stole the machine. Hannah urges him to comply with the men, but he tries to escape and dies. He wakes with a start back in bed with Hannah, only to relive the same scenario. This time, after freeing the two of them, he asks Hannah to help poison the intruders with cyanide gas. The plan fails when Hannah reveals that she is a member of the Bloc. Renton surrenders the scrips and then Sonny shoots him.

In the next iteration, Renton questions Hannah about her past before freeing her. She admits that she grew to resent him after he abandoned her to Torus, who tortured her. Though he does not trust Hannah, Renton and Hannah work out a deal where they will split the scrips after using the cyanide gas to force Father and his group to stand down. Once they have the three men captured, though, Renton reneges on the deal, demanding that Hannah abandon the Bloc and come with him. Hannah accidentally shoots Renton in an ensuing scuffle. When Renton and Hannah wake up together, she can now recall the previous iteration. Renton theorizes that the ARQ is causing a time loop. He also realizes that the ARQ does not function as a perpetual motion machine, but in fact generates the time loop as a way to continue using the energy from the gasoline used to catalyze the process, making it seem as if it is generating endless energy. Eventually, Sonny reveals himself as a Torus mercenary and kills everyone.

Renton and Hannah agree in the next iteration that they must keep the ARQ from Torus. They convince Father to help them stop Sonny but, once they do, Brother shoots Renton, not realizing that Sonny works for Torus. In the next iteration, Sonny becomes aware of the time loop and immediately kills Father and Brother. When Sonny overpowers them, Renton sacrifices himself to prevent Sonny from acquiring the ARQ.

In the next iteration, Sonny saves Cuz, another mercenary who was fatally electrocuted by the ARQ at the start of every previous loop, then kills Father and Brother. Renton and Hannah poison Sonny and Cuz with the cyanide. Before dying, Sonny sets a trap that kills Hannah, prompting Renton to allow the next iteration to begin. Everyone is now aware of the time loop, and Sonny and Cuz take everyone hostage. After Sonny forces Renton to disable the machine, Father and Brother die in the confusion of a blackout. Renton and Hannah briefly escape and realize the time loop is localized to the house. Renton decides to go back inside to destroy the machine and Hannah goes back with him.

After they kill Cuz, who turns out to have been Hannah's torturer, Sonny restarts the ARQ, only to be killed himself. An interrupted video message and the ARQ's logs reveal a second, outer time loop: after every nine time loops, all of their memories are reset due to the ARQ restarting. They have unknowingly repeated the same nine loops thousands of times. Realizing they are on their ninth loop, Renton and Hannah leave a desperate message to themselves, hoping future iterations can get the ARQ to the Bloc before Torus's reinforcements arrive. After a robot breaks through and kills them, Hannah wakes with a gasp.

== Cast ==
- Robbie Amell as Renton
- Rachael Taylor as Hannah / Mother
- Shaun Benson as Sonny
- Gray Powell as Grimm / Father
- Jacob Neayem as Brother
- Adam Butcher as Cuz
- Tantoo Cardinal as The Pope
- Nicolas Van Burek as News Anchor
- Jamie Spilchuk as Mobius Common

== Production ==
The concept dates back to 2008, prior to writer-director Tony Elliot's work on the television series Orphan Black; the show's creators hired him based on his unproduced script. The script had been optioned but remained in development hell for years. After the rights reverted to Elliott, Netflix contacted his producer and offered to produce it. In January 2016, it was announced that Netflix would produce and distribute the film. Mason Novick, John Finemore, Kyle Franke, and Nick Spicer produced the film under their Lost City and XYZ Films banner. That same month, it was announced that Robbie Amell and Rachael Taylor had been cast in the film. Shooting took place in Toronto over 19 days. Elliott quoted the budget at "under $2 million".

== Release ==
The film had its world premiere at the Toronto International Film Festival on September 9, 2016. The film was released on September 16, 2016.

== Reception ==
John DeFore of The Hollywood Reporter called it a "tricky little time twister that makes the most of its limited resources", comparing it to Groundhog Day and Edge of Tomorrow in its concept. DeFore wrote that the film throws many new wrinkles into its looping plot, causing viewers to eventually stop trying to predict characters' actions. Of the film's climax, DeFore said, "Amazingly, given how many time-travel pix collapse in a tangle of logic around this point, ARQ knows how to wrap its paradoxes up in a way we can hardly criticize."

On Rotten Tomatoes, ARQ holds a 43% rating with critics, from seven reviews.

== See also ==
- List of films featuring time loops
