= Gail Harvey =

Canadian film and television director

Gail Harvey is a Canadian film and television director based in Toronto, Ontario. She is most noted as director of the television film No One Would Tell, for which she won the Canadian Screen Award for Best Direction in a TV Movie at the 8th Canadian Screen Awards in 2020.

She began her career as a photojournalist with United Press International, becoming noted when she accompanied Terry Fox on the Marathon of Hope and took many of the best-known photographs of Fox. After directing the short documentary film Uphill in a Wheelchair: The Wayne Pronger Story in 1987, she enrolled at the Canadian Film Centre in 1988; the following year she released her student film Exposed, a short film written by her CFC classmate Edwina Follows.

She released her debut feature film, The Shower, in 1992.

She subsequently directed the films Cold Sweat, Striking Poses, Looking Is the Original Sin and Never Saw It Coming.

She has worked predominantly in television, directing episodes of television series such as Liberty Street, Train 48, Paradise Falls, ReGenesis, The Best Years, The Line, Bloodletting & Miraculous Cures, Republic of Doyle, Murdoch Mysteries, Lost Girl, Heartland, Carter, Family Law, Pretty Hard Cases and Sullivan's Crossing.

From her marriage to journalist Kevin Boland, she is the mother of actress Katie Boland.
