= Maria del Mar (actress) =

Canadian television actress

- Born: Maria del Mar del Castillo
- Education: Carleton University
- Occupation: Actress
- Years active: 1987–present
- Known for: Street Legal, Blue Murder

Maria del Mar del Castillo (Spanish: [maˈɾi.a ðel ˈmaɾ ðel kasˈtiʝo]) is a Canadian television actress.

== Biography ==
Maria del Mar played in recurring roles on series like Street Legal, TekWar, Mercy Point, Relativity, Blue Murder, Terminal City and Murdoch Mysteries.

She was married to screenwriter Guy Mullally, who met on the set of Street Legal. The marriage had two children, a girl named Paloma and a boy named Gabriel.

Her performance in A Touch of Grey (2009) earned her a Canadian Comedy Award in the 13th ceremony for the best female performance in a feature and nominated in 2001 to Gemini Award in the 16th edition for best performance by an actress in a continuing leading dramatic role for Blue Murder.

== Filmography ==
Film
Year	Title	Role	Notes	Ref.
1988	Kamilla and the Thief	Petra		
1994	Cold Sweat	Joanne		
1994	Eclipse	Sarah		
2000	Price of Glory	Rita Ortega		
2001	Diary of a Sex Addict	Vita	Video	
2003	The Dog Walker	Narrator	Short film	
2004	The Skulls III	Det. Valdez	Video	
2005	My Last Confession	Margaret Riley	Short film	
2006	Jekyll + Hyde	Prof. Poole		
2007	14 Days in Paradise	Barbara		
2009	A Touch of Grey	Barb		
2010	Drop Zone: Fiji			
2012	C.E.O.	Juliette	Short film	
2012	Looking Is the Original Sin	Helene	Completed	
2013	Blackline: The Beirut Contract	Autumn	Post-production	
2014	Devil's Mile	Cally		
2015	No Deposit	Maureen Ryan		

Television
Year	Title	Role	Notes	Ref.
1987	The Disney Sunday Movie	Uncredited	Episode: "The Liberators"	
1988	Diamonds		Episode: "By the Book"	
1988	The Child Saver	Lola	TV film	
1988	Night Heat	Leoni Drake	Episode: "Goodbodies"	
1989	My Secret Identity	Patricia	Episode: "The Video Connection"	
1989	War of the Worlds	Estelle	Episode: "He Feedeth Among the Lilies"	
1989	Street Legal	Isabel Margues	Episode: "Brotherhoods"	
1989-1991	E.N.G.	Martha Antonelli	Recurring role (9 episodes)	
1990	The Kids in the Hall	Miriam	Episode 1.18	
1991-1994	Street Legal	Laura Crosby	Main role (48 episodes)	
1992	Revolver	Dancer	TV film	
1992	Forever Knight	Magda	Episode: "For I Have Sinned"	
1993	Secret Service	Meehan	Episode: "Murder for Hire/Don't Bank on It"	
1993	Matrix	Miss Lumley	Episode: "Marked Man"	
1994	Monster Force	Additional Voices	13 episodes	
1995	Kung Fu: The Legend Continues	Melanie Parker	Episode: "Chinatown Murder Mystery: The Case of the Poisoned Hand"	
1995	Tails You Live, Heads You're Dead	Melanie Quint	TV film	
1995-1996	TekWar	Lt. Sam Houston	Main role (13 episodes)	
1996	Moonshine Highway	Ethel Miller	TV film	
1996	Relativity	Julia Cordoza	Episode: "Just One More Thing"	
1996	Unlikely Angel	Allison	TV film	
1997	Frasier	Leslie Wellman	Episode: "Three Dates and a Breakup"	
1997	The Practice	A.D.A. Cindy Lichtman	Episode: "The Civil Right"	
1998	The Outer Limits	Jennifer Rigny	Episode: "Black Box"	
1998-1999	Mercy Point	Dr. Haylen Breslauer	Main role (8 episodes)	
1999	The Crow: Stairway to Heaven	D.A. Shaw	Episode: "The People vs. Eric Draven"	
1999	Little Men	Bandit	Episode: "Three Angry Women"	
2001	RoboCop: Prime Directives	Sara Cable	TV miniseries	
2001-2002	Blue Murder	Insp. Victoria Castillo	Lead role (26 episodes)	
2002	Monk	Monica Waters	Episode: "Mr. Monk and the Other Woman"	
2002	Doc		Episode: "On Pins and Needles"	
2002	The Christmas Shoes	Kate Layton	TV film	
2003	The Pentagon Papers	Carol Ellsberg	TV film	
2004	24	Rachel Forrester	Recurring role (3 episodes)	
2004	JAG	Alicia Montes	Episodes: "Retrial", "The Four Percent Solution"	
2005	Terminal City	Katie Sampson	Lead role (10 episodes)	
2006	For the Love of a Child	Annie	TV film	
2006	Engaged to Kill	Abby Lord	TV film	
2008	Murdoch Mysteries	Sarah Pensell	Episodes: "Elementary, My Dear Murdoch", "Bad Medicine"	
2010	Bloodletting & Miraculous Cures	Dr. Miniadis	Episodes: "Code Clock", "Family Practice"	
2011	Lost Girl	Donna	Episode: "Fae Gone Wild"	
2012	King	Abigail Faulkner	Episode: "Justice Calvin Faulkner"	
2012	Flashpoint	Wendy Travis	Episode: "Eyes In"	
2012	Transporter: The Series	Blanche Xavier	Episode: "Dead Drop"	
2013	Holidaze	Jen	TV film	
2014	Hannibal	Marion Vega	Episode: "Hassun"	
2020	Hudson & Rex	Veronica Kaatchi	Episode: "Art of Darkness. S1 E10"	

== Awards and nominations ==
=== Gemini Awards ===
Year	Category	Work	Result
2001	Best Performance by an Actress in a Continuing Leading Dramatic Role	Blue Murder	Nominated

=== ACTRA Toronto Awards ===
Year	Category	Work	Result
2007	Outstanding Performance – Female	Terminal City	Won

=== Canadian Comedy Awards ===
Year	Category	Work	Result
2011	Best Female Performance in a Feature	A Touch of Grey	Won
