= Videoville Showtime =

Canadian film distribution company

Videoville Showtime Inc.
- Logo used since 2022
- Formerly: Video-Ville Showtime Inc.
- Type: Private
- Industry: Motion pictures
- Founded: May 27, 1983; 43 years ago
- Founder: Ernie Grivakis
- Headquarters: 407 McGill St; Montreal, Quebec, Canada
- Area served: Canada; Australia; New Zealand
- Key people: Ernie Grivakis (CEO); Harry Grivakis (SVP); Javi Hernandez (Executive Vice President)
- Products: Theatrical, DVD, Blu-ray, Ultra HD Blu-ray, VOD, SVOD, TV
- Services: Motion Picture distribution
- Number of employees: 30
- Website: https://vvsfilms.com/

Videoville Showtime Inc., doing business as VVS Films, is a Canadian motion picture distribution company founded by Ernie Grivakis. The company was formed in Montreal, Quebec on May 27, 1983 and operates its theatrical sales & marketing office out of Toronto, Ontario.

== Films ==
=== Canada ===
Release date	Title	Genre	Notes
January 21, 2011	The Company Men	Drama	
July 29, 2011	Jock the Hero Dog	Animated, Comedy	
March 9, 2012	Friends with Kids	Romantic Comedy	
August 10, 2012	Freelancers	Action	
September 21, 2012	End of Watch	Action, Thriller	
October 16, 2012	Rites of Passage	Thriller	
December 7, 2012	Playing for Keeps	Romantic Comedy	
January 4, 2013	Texas Chainsaw 3D	Slasher, Horror	
January 11, 2013	A Haunted House	Satirical, Horror, Comedy	
March 19, 2013	Empire State	Crime, Drama	
March 22, 2013	Olympus Has Fallen	Political, Action, Thriller	
March 22, 2013	Spring Breakers	Comedy, Crime	
June 14, 2013	Vehicle 19	Action, Thriller	
October 11, 2013	Machete Kills	Action, Exploitation	
November 27, 2013	Homefront	Action, Thriller	
December 6, 2013	Out of the Furnace	Crime, Drama	
January 27, 2014	That Awkward Moment	Comedy, Drama	
March 28, 2014	Sabotage	Action, Thriller	
March 28, 2014	A Haunted House 2	Satirical, Horror, Comedy	
April 25, 2014	Brick Mansions	Action	
May 9, 2014	Chef	Road, Comedy, Drama	
July 25, 2014	And So It Goes	Comedy, Drama	
August 22, 2014	Are You Here	Comedy, Drama	
August 27, 2014	The November Man	Spy, Action, Thriller	
September 26, 2014	Good People	Action, Thriller	
October 31, 2014	Horns	Horror, Comedy	
March 30, 2015	Wild Card	Action, Thriller	
April 13, 2015	Escobar: Paradise Lost	Romantic Thriller	
June 29, 2015	Last Knights	Action, Drama	
July 13, 2015	Maggie Moore(s)	Black Comedy, Mystery	
October 26, 2015	Z for Zachariah	Apocalyptic, Science Fiction	
November 23, 2015	No Escape	Action, Thriller	
November 30, 2015	Mississippi Grind	Comedy, Drama	
December 21, 2015	Sleeping with Other People	Romantic Comedy	
January 22, 2016	Dirty Grandpa	Comedy	
April 8, 2016	Demolition	Comedy, Drama	
August 12, 2016	Hell or High Water	neo-Western, Crime, Drama	
November 18, 2016	The Edge of Seventeen	Coming-of-age, Comedy, Drama	
June 16, 2017	All Eyez on Me	Biography, Drama	
August 4, 2017	Wind River	neo-Western, Crime	
August 18, 2017	The Hitman's Bodyguard	Action, Comedy	
December 8, 2017	I, Tonya	Biography, Sports	
January 19, 2018	Den of Thieves	Heist, Action, Crime, Drama	
February 2, 2018	Braven	Action, Thriller	
April 20, 2018	I Feel Pretty	Comedy	
May 11, 2018	Terminal	Neo Noir, Thriller	
June 15, 2018	Gotti	Biography, Crime	
June 29, 2018	Escape Plan 2: Hades	Prison, Action, Thriller	
August 17, 2018	Mile 22	Espionage, Action, Thriller, Spy	
August 24, 2018	The Happytime Murders	Puppet, Cop, Buddy, Comedy	
October 12, 2018	Beautiful Boy	Biographical, Drama	
October 19, 2018	Mid90s	Coming-of-age, Comedy, Drama	
October 26, 2018	Hunter Killer	Action, Thriller	
April 12, 2019	Hellboy	Superhero, Dark Fantasy	
April 12, 2019	After	Romantic Drama	
May 3, 2019	UglyDolls	Musical, Comedy, Adventure	
July 2, 2019	Escape Plan: The Extractors	Prison, Action, Thriller	
August 16, 2019	47 Meters Down: Uncaged	Survival, Horror	
August 23, 2019	Angel Has Fallen	Political, Action, Thriller	
September 20, 2019	Rambo: Last Blood	Vigilante, Action	
October 18, 2019	The Lighthouse	Psychological Horror	
November 8, 2019	21 Bridges	Action, Thriller	
January 24, 2020	The Gentlemen	Action, Comedy	
January 24, 2020	Color Out of Space	Science Fiction, Horror	
August 28, 2020	Bill & Ted Face the Music	Science Fiction, Comedy	
August 28, 2020	Rogue	Action, Thriller, Horror	
October 9, 2020	The War with Grandpa	Family, Comedy	
October 16, 2020	Honest Thief	Action, Thriller	
October 23, 2020	After We Collided	Romantic Drama	
November 20, 2020	Jiu Jitsu	Science Fiction, Martial Arts	
February 12, 2021	Willy's Wonderland	Action, Comedy, Horror	
March 5, 2021	Boss Level	Science Fiction, Action	
April 16, 2021	Vanquish	Action, Thriller	
May 7, 2021	Wrath of Man	Action, Thriller	
June 11, 2021	The Misfits	Heist, Action	
June 16, 2021	Hitman's Wife's Bodyguard	Action, Comedy	
June 25, 2021	The Ice Road	Action, Thriller	
August 20, 2021	The Protégé	Action, Thriller	
September 10, 2021	The Card Counter	Crime, Drama	
September 30, 2021	After We Fell	Romantic Drama	
January 21, 2022	The Tiger Rising	Family, Drama	
March 18, 2022	X	Slasher, Horror	
May 20, 2022	Men	Horror, Fantasy, Thriller	
August 12, 2022	Fall	Survival, Psychological Thriller	
September 7, 2022	After Ever Happy	Romantic Drama	
September 8, 2022	Medieval	Historical, Drama	
September 16, 2022	Pearl	Period, Horror	
March 31, 2023	Spinning Gold	Biography, Drama	
April 7, 2023	One True Loves	Romantic Comedy, Drama	
April 28, 2023	The Black Demon	Science Fiction, Thriller, Horror	
May 26, 2023	Kandahar	Spy, Action, Thriller	
July 28, 2023	Talk to Me	Supernatural, Horror	
August 18, 2023	Haunting of the Queen Mary	Horror	
September 1, 2023	The Good Mother	Crime, Thriller	
October 6, 2023	Dicks: The Musical	Musical, Comedy	
October 6, 2023	She Came to Me	Romantic Comedy	
October 6, 2023	Cat Person	Comedy, Drama, Thriller	
September 13, 2023	After Everything	Romantic Drama	
December 1, 2023	Silent Night	Vigilante, Action, Thriller	
December 8, 2023	Fast Charlie	Action, Thriller	
January 5, 2024	He Went That Way	Crime, Drama	
January 12, 2024	The Beekeeper	Action, Thriller	
February 27, 2024	The Bricklayer	Action, Thriller, Spy	
March 8, 2024	Love Lies Bleeding	Romantic Thriller	
March 15, 2024	One Life	Biography, Drama	
March 19, 2024	Land of Bad	Action, Thriller	
April 26, 2024	Boy Kills World	Dystopian, Action, Comedy, Thriller	
April 26, 2024	Breathe	Science Fiction, Thriller	
April 26, 2024	The King Tide	Drama, Thriller, Horror	
May 3, 2024	I Saw the TV Glow	Psychological Horror, Drama	
May 24, 2024	Hit Man	Biography, Romantic Comedy	
June 4, 2024	Blood for Dust	Action, Thriller, Crime	
June 21, 2024	Thelma	Comedy, Drama	
June 28, 2024	A Sacrifice	Psychological Thriller, Drama	
July 5, 2024	MaXXXine	Horror	
August 16, 2024	My Penguin Friend	Family, Adventure	
August 23, 2024	Strange Darling	Thriller	
September 13, 2024	Subservience	Science Fiction, Thriller	
September 20, 2024	A Different Man	Black Comedy, Psychological, Thriller	
October 8, 2024	Hellboy: The Crooked Man	Superhero, Horror	
October 18, 2024	Woman of the Hour	Crime, Thriller	
November 1, 2024	Here	Drama	
November 1, 2024	Hitpig!	Animated, Comedy	
November 1, 2024	Absolution	Action, Crime, Thriller	
November 8, 2024	Heretic	Psychological Horror	
November 8, 2024	Elevation	Post-apocalyptic, Action, Thriller	
December 6, 2024	Y2K	Disaster, Comedy, Horror	
December 6, 2024	Werewolves	Action, Horror	
December 13, 2024	Dirty Angels	Action, Thriller	
January 1, 2025	Beating Hearts	Crime, Romance	
January 10, 2025	Den of Thieves 2: Pantera	Heist, Action, Crime, Drama	
January 10, 2025	Young Werther	Romantic Comedy	
February 21, 2025	Old Guy	Action, Comedy	
March 14, 2025	Opus	Thriller	
March 28, 2025	Death of a Unicorn	Comedy, Horror	
April 18, 2025	The Wedding Banquet	Romantic Comedy	
May 16, 2025	Friendship	Comedy	
June 6, 2025	The Ritual	Horror	
June 13, 2025	Materialists	Romantic Comedy	
June 27, 2025	Sorry, Baby	Comedy, Drama	
July 18, 2025	Eddington	neo-Western, Comedy	
July 18, 2025	Guns Up	Action, Comedy	
July 24, 2025	Ick	Science Fiction, Comedy, Horror	
July 25, 2025	The Home	Horror, Thriller	
August 15, 2025	Red Sonja	Sword and Sorcery, Fantasy	
August 29, 2025	The Toxic Avenger	Superhero, Comedy	
September 5, 2025	Bad Man	Action, Comedy	
October 3, 2025	The Smashing Machine	Sports, Drama	
October 3, 2025	Coyotes	Comedy, Horror, Thriller	
October 17, 2025	If I Had Legs I'd Kick You	Comedy, Drama	
October 17, 2025	The Astronaut	Science Fiction, Horror	
December 12, 2025	Silent Night, Deadly Night	Slasher	
December 12, 2025	Not Without Hope	Thriller	
January 23, 2026	Return to Silent Hill	Horror	
February 6, 2026	The Moment	Mockumentary, Comedy	
February 20, 2026	How to Make a Killing	Comedy, Thriller	
March 13, 2026	undertone	Horror	
March 20, 2026	Wardriver	Crime, Thriller	
April 3, 2026	The Drama	Comedy, Drama	
April 21, 2026	Maya & Samar	Romance, Drama	
April 24, 2026	Fuze	Crime, Thriller	
April 24, 2026	Mother Mary	Drama, Thriller	
May 8, 2026	At the Place of Ghosts	Thriller	
May 19, 2026	Wardriver	Crime, Thriller	
May 26, 2026	Brothers Under Fire	Action, Thriller	
June 23, 2026	Neglected	Action, Thriller	
July 3, 2026	The Invite	Comedy	
July 24, 2026	The Outer Threat	Thriller	
August 21, 2026	The Magic Faraway Tree	Fantasy, Adventure	
August 28, 2026	Coyote vs. Acme	Animated, Comedy	
August 28, 2026	Idiots	Comedy	
September 2, 2026	Fall 2: Deadpoint	Thriller	
September 4, 2026	By Any Means	Crime, Thriller	
September 4, 2026	Onslaught	Sci-Fi, Action, Thriller	
September 11, 2026	Runner	Action, Thriller	
September 18, 2026	Shaun the Sheep: The Beast of Mossy Bottom	Animated, Comedy	
October 16, 2026	You Can See Everything	Documentary	
October 23, 2026	A Talent for Murder	Thriller	
October 23, 2026	Wildwood	Animated, Fantasy	
October 30, 2026	Crawlers	Horror	
November 13, 2026	Victorian Psycho	Horror, Thriller	
November 27, 2026	Josephine	Drama, Thriller	
December 11, 2026	Ink	Biography, Drama	
TBA	Black Box	Sci-Fi, Horror	
TBA	Slayground	Action, Thriller	

=== Australia and New Zealand ===
Release date	Title	Genre	Notes
December 7, 2023	Dicks: The Musical	Musical, Comedy	
January 1, 2024	Dream Scenario	Comedy, Drama	
March 14, 2024	Love Lies Bleeding	Romance, Crime, Thriller	
May 2, 2024	Boy Kills World	Action, Comedy	
August 22, 2024	Strange Darling	Thriller	
October 31, 2024	Here	Drama	
March 28, 2025	Death of a Unicorn	Fantasy, Comedy	
August 14, 2025	The Home	Horror, Thriller	
September 4, 2025	Sorry, Baby	Comedy, Drama	
September 10, 2025	Guns Up	Action, Comedy	
October 2, 2025	The Smashing Machine	Biographical, Drama	
October 16, 2025	Roofman	Biographical, Crime, Comedy, Drama	
February 5, 2026	If I Had Legs I'd Kick You	Comedy, Drama	
February 19, 2026	Fackham Hall	Period, Comedy	
March 26, 2026	The Magic Faraway Tree	Fantasy, Adventure	
April 2, 2026	The Drama	Comedy, Drama	
April 16, 2026	Fuze	Crime, Thriller	
May 14, 2026	Mother Mary	Drama, Thriller	
June 11, 2026	Tuner	Crime, Thriller	
July 9, 2026	The Invite	Comedy, Drama	
August 20, 2026	Spa Weekend	Comedy	
August 27, 2026	I Want Your Sex	Comedy, Thriller	
September 3, 2026	By Any Means	Crime, Thriller	
September 10, 2026	Runner	Action, Thriller	
October 29, 2026	Crawlers	Horror	
TBA	Bunker	Thriller	

== Distribution ==
It has direct, full-service distribution across all media in both English and French speaking Canada. In 2023, the company expanded its distribution territory to Australia and New Zealand with the Nicolas Cage-starring Dream Scenario.
