= Jane's House =

- Genre: Drama
- Based on: Jane's House by Robert Kimmel Smith
- Screenplay by: Eric Roth
- Directed by: Glenn Jordan
- Starring: James Woods; Anne Archer; Melissa Lahlitah Crider
- Theme music composer: David Shire
- Country of origin: United States
- Original language: English

Production
- Executive producers: Michael Phillips; Aaron Spelling; E. Duke Vincent
- Producers: Glenn Jordan; Christopher Morgan
- Production location: Vancouver
- Cinematography: Ron Orieux
- Editor: John A. Martinelli
- Running time: 90 minutes
- Production companies: Michael Phillips Productions; Spelling Entertainment

Original release
- Network: CBS
- Release: January 2, 1994

Jane's House is a 1994 American television drama film starring James Woods, Anne Archer, and Melissa Lahlitah Crider. It was directed by Glenn Jordan, who had previously worked with Woods on the 1986 TV movie Promise and the 1991 TV movie The Boys. The film first aired on the CBS network on January 2, 1994.

The film was based on the 1982 novel of the same name by Robert Kimmel Smith. The book is an American Library Association Best Book for Young Adults and a nationwide best-seller.

== Background ==
The film stars James Woods as Paul Clark, Anne Archer as Mary Parker and Melissa Lahlitah Crider as Hilary Clark. Others in the film included Graham Beckel as Charlie, Diane D'Aquila as Marion, Keegan MacIntosh as Bobby and Barry Bonds as himself.

The film was filmed in Vancouver, British Columbia, Canada.

Unlike many TV movies, Jane's House was never released on VHS or DVD, leaving the film to be available unofficially only, recorded from a television showing.

After meeting each other during the film project, Woods announced his engagement to 23-year-old actress Melissa Lahlitah Crider in 1997, but their wedding was later called off, and they broke up in 2000.

== Plot ==
Paul Clark and his children, Hilary and Bobby, are really down-hearted after the death of Jane, Paul's wife. After seventeen years of happy suburban marriage, Paul loses Jane to a heart attack, and is left alone to raise their two children. Paul also runs a couple of sporting-goods stores with his younger brother Charlie. Hilary needs advice on birth control, Bobby blames himself for his mother's having gone away, and Paul sleepwalks through his loss. This is until Mary Parker enters his life. A former tennis star who is now an agent and promoter of active athletes, something about Paul's courtliness attracts Mary, who never had time for childhood or marriage. She sends him Barry Bonds, the San Francisco Giants MVP outfielder, to sign baseballs at the sporting-goods store, and in return Paul sends her a pair of shoes. Soon they meet for coffee, listen to Mozart and have dinner, where they soon decide to live together. This appears to be very difficult as their characters are totally different, and so are their lifestyles. Mary is continuously reminded of the deceased Jane, where the children do not take well to their new stepmother. The film focuses on the struggle to make a new life after the experience of death and grief.

== Cast ==
- James Woods as Paul Clark
- Anne Archer as Mary Parker
- Melissa Lahlitah Crider as Hilary Clark
- Graham Beckel as Charlie
- Diane D'Aquila as Marion
- Keegan MacIntosh as Bobby Clark
- Barry Bonds as himself
- Jeff Irvine as Paressi
- Carrie Cain-Sparks as Gemma
- Eric Keenleyside as Frank
- Terence Kelly as the Judge
- Fred Henderson as the Tailored Man
- Austin Basile as Peter
- Debbie Podowski as Woman #1
- Donna Yamamoto as Woman #2
- Lossen Chambers as Mary's Assistant
- Gabrielle Miller as the Girl
- Mike McCormack as the Football Player
- Robyn Driscoll as the Limo Driver
- Diana Stevan (uncredited)

== Reception ==
Upon release, New York Magazine gave the film a favorable review and wrote, "In the agreeable "Jane's House", what's so agreeable may be all those elements of the routine TV movie of the week that this one omits. There is neither stalking nor incest, not a single traumatic secret, nobody dies on-camera, and absolutely nothing is explained, sanctioned or abhorred by a lawyer of therapist. "Jane's House" aspires to a troubled, Laurie Colwin sort of sweetness, and achieves it. None of the story would be remarkable except for the quiet performance of James Woods. After so much raw meat, this is vegetarian James Woods: baffled, decent, tentative, nostalgic, romantic, domestic. As his suffering was sotto voce, almost parenthetical, so his brand-new love is a hum, not a crescendo. Instead of raging, he accommodates. All the competitive edges belong to Anne Archer. In an odd (and affecting) reversal of traditional roles, once they all move out of their suburban memory palace, Woods will be the wife in his second marriage. I'm not saying "Jane's House" has anything so radical in mind. But in the hesitations of his portrayal, Woods leaves us room to imagine all kinds of things. For once, we aren't bullied."

Upon the film's original broadcast, the Observer-Reporter gave the film three out of five stars, also writing a review under the headline "Woods, Archer outstanding in 'Jane's House'." The review stated, "Two exceptional performances raise the soap opera plot to a higher level. The "Jane" of the title is James Woods' dead wife, who apparently was a "one of a kind" person who could do it all. Woods meets Ann Archer, a woman with a lot to offer, and they marry. But it's an uphill climb for Archer to befriend Jane's two children and to overcome the dead woman's indelible image. The writing is never mawkish, and the two leads are so good they almost make you forget you've seen this story a hundred times before."

Chicago Sun-Times gave the film three out of five stars upon release, stating "James Woods softens his image in "Jane's House," a three star love story airing from 8 to 10p.m. Sunday on Channel 2. The intense actor takes a gentler approach to his role as a Long Island sporting goods retailer, still mourning his wife a year after her death."
