= Looking Is the Original Sin =

- Directed by: Gail Harvey
- Written by: Gail Harvey
- Starring: Maria del Mar; Katie Boland
- Release date: November 22, 2013
- Running time: 83 minutes
- Country: Canada
- Language: English

Looking Is the Original Sin is a 2013 Canadian drama film written and directed by Gail Harvey and starring Maria del Mar and Katie Boland. It is based on the life of American photographer Diane Arbus.

== Cast ==
- Katie Boland as Anna
- Maria del Mar as Helene
- Kent Staines as Brent
- Jayne Eastwood as Janet

== Release ==
The film was released on November 22, 2013.

== Reception ==
Linda Barnard of the Toronto Star awarded the film two stars.
