= Shaun Benson =

Canadian actor

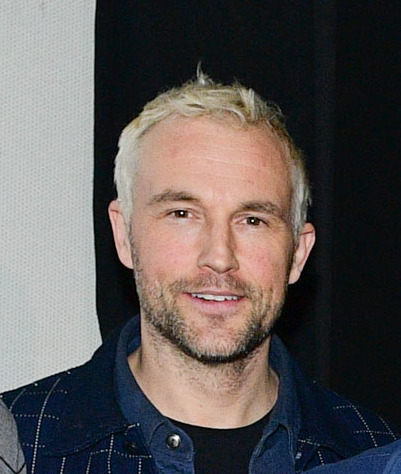
- Benson at National Canadian Film Day 2018
- Born: January 16, 1976 (age 50); Guelph, Ontario, Canada
- Occupations: Actor, director
- Years active: 1990s–present

Shaun Benson (born January 16, 1976) is a Canadian actor and director. He acted in several theatre productions in the 1990s before embarking on his film and television career.

In 2002, Benson appeared alongside Harrison Ford in the American submarine film K-19: The Widowmaker and has since starred in various films including ARQ (2016), Never Saw It Coming (2017) and I Still See You (2018). He portrayed Dr. Steven Webber in the American daytime TV soap opera General Hospital in 2004 and 2005. More recently, he appeared as Gary Yolen in the first season of the horror anthology series Channel Zero (2016) and Topher Brooks in the Netflix series Tiny Pretty Things (2020).

He has trained in the Meisner technique of acting and teaches Meisner acting classes.

== Early life ==
Benson was born in Guelph, Ontario. He is the son of Eugene Benson, an English professor and a prolific novelist, playwright and librettist. He later graduated from the University of Western Ontario with a bachelor of science in chemistry and biochemistry, before studying acting at the George Brown College Theater School in Toronto.

While at university he began training in karate. He holds a 5th Degree Black Belt and his Renshi Teaching Certificate in Legacy Shorin Ryu under Hanshi Gary Legacy and Kyoshi Randy Dauphin and a Brown Belt in Brazilian Jiu Jitsu from Toronto BJJ under Jorge Britto with his time in Los Angeles spent training with Jean-Jacques Machado.

== Career ==
=== Acting ===
Benson's early roles as an actor included theatrical productions of John Palmer's Singapore, Fabrizio Filippo's Waiting for Lewis, William Shakespeare's Love's Labour's Lost, and Robin Fulford's Steel Kiss.

In 2000, he appeared in a Molson Canadian commercial as a Canadian office worker who unleashes a torrent of hockey-style violence on an American coworker taunting him with Canadian stereotypes. In 2001, he was cast in a lead role in the television drama series The Associates.

In 2002, following the cancellation of The Associates, he was cast in the legal drama series Just Cause, which ran for one season.

He played the recurring role of Dr. Steven Lars Webber on the soap opera General Hospital from 2004 to 2005, which attracted him considerable attention compared to his previous roles. Since his time on General Hospital, Benson has guest starred in numerous television series, including Cold Case, The Unit, and Being Erica. In 2008, he appeared in the Proud Family film Oscar Proud.

In 2012, he starred in the IMAX 3D documentary film Flight of the Butterflies and in French comedy Populaire.

In the 2015 made-for-TV movie Kept Woman, he played an eccentric professor, Simon, who kidnaps his neighbor Jessica, played by Courtney Ford. Also in 2015, he starred in the Starz television series The Girlfriend Experience.

In 2016, Benson appeared in the Netflix time loop thriller ARQ as Sonny, as well as Season 2 of the series Gangland Undercover as Crowbar. He subsequently appeared in the SyFy series Channel Zero as the town sheriff, Gary Yolen.

Between 2017 and 2021, he appeared in many prestige projects including The Boys on Amazon as Ezekiel, Tiny Pretty Things on Netflix as Brooks, Code 8 as Dixon, as well as independent and TV film work for Lifetime, SyFy, etc.

Benson has trained as an actor using the Meisner technique and teaches Meisner acting classes in Toronto.

=== Directing ===
In 2013, Benson directed Stop/Kiss by Diana Son for the Toronto Fringe Festival. The play won best of festival and garnered and extended run.

He directed the 2015 independent film Barn Wedding, which won the HMV People's Pick For Best Flick award at the 2015 Canadian Film Fest.

In 2021, he co-wrote, co-directed and starred, with Karen Knox, in Borderline which had its World Premiere in the UK at Crystal Palace International Film Festival and its North American Premiere at Dances With Films at the Chinese Theatre.

== Filmography ==
=== Film ===
| Year | Title | Role | Notes |
|---|---|---|---|
| 2002 | K-19: The Widowmaker | Leonid Pashinski | |
| 2007 | The Metrosexual | Eric Bremer | |
| 2008 | Prank | Erik | |
| 2012 | Populaire | Bob Taylor | |
| 2013 | The Beautiful Risk | William | Also known as Le Beau Risque |
| 2013 | Home Sweet Home | Sheriff Sanders | |
| 2015 | Barn Wedding | Derrick | |
| 2015 | Unearthing | Sheriff Brian Wrigley | |
| 2016 | ARQ | Sonny | |
| 2016 | Edge of Winter | Ted | |
| 2016 | Interlude City of a Dead Woman | Theodrick | |
| 2017 | Trench 11 | Kapitan Müller | |
| 2018 | Never Saw It Coming | Kirk Nicholson | |
| 2018 | 22 Chaser | Elvis | |
| 2018 | I Still See You | Mr. Calder | |
| 2019 | Togo | Gunnar Kaasen | |
| 2019 | Queen of the Morning Calm | Ian | |
| 2019 | Code 8 | Dixon | |
| 2019 | Boys vs. Girls | Gary | |
| 2020 | Fatman | Lex | |
| 2021 | Banned | Frank | |
| 2022 | Slash/Back | Officer Lefebvre | |
| 2022 | Trader | Bob the Broker | Voice part |
| 2023 | Home Free | Vincent | |
| 2023 | Good Wife's Guide to Murder | Benjamin Diggs | |
| 2024 | Yuppie | Joe Dickinson | |

=== Television ===
| Year | Title | Role | Notes |
|---|---|---|---|
| 2001–2002 | The Associates | Jonah Gleason | Recurring role |
| 2002–2003 | Just Cause | Patrick Heller | Main role |
| 2004–2005 | General Hospital | Dr. Steven Webber | Recurring role |
| 2006 | Cold Case | Truck Sugar | Episode: "The Red and the Blue" |
| 2007 | The Unit | Interrogater #1 | Episode: "Sub-Conscious" |
| 2009 | Tornado Valley | Bobby | Television film |
| 2010 | Being Erica | Will Appleyard | 3 episodes |
| 2010 | Wedding for One | Jeff Doyle | Television film |
| 2011 | Against the Wall | Mike Fletcher | Episode: "Obsessed and Unwanted" |
| 2011 | Flashpoint | Geoff Daikin | Episode: "Grounded" |
| 2011 | Stay with Me | Davis Sakeris | Television film |
| 2012 | The Listener | Jack Newman | Episode: "The Bank Job" |
| 2012 | Haven | Robert Taylor | Episode: "Reunion" |
| 2012 | Republic of Doyle | Eric Langtson / Eric Howlett | 2 episodes |
| 2013 | Played | Charlie Mulcair | Episode: "Revenge" |
| 2013 | Cracked | Damian Tremblay | Episode: "The Hold Out" |
| 2013 | Heartland | Adrian Gilson | 3 episodes |
| 2013 | Lucky 7 | Phil | Episode: "Cable Guy" |
| 2014 | Darknet | Desmond | Episode: "Darknet 3" |
| 2014 | Defiance: The Lost Ones | Lenny | Recurring role; 5 episodes |
| 2014 | Working the Engels | Ken | Episode: "Jenna vs. The Momfia" |
| 2014 | That's My DJ | Mark | Television miniseries; 3 episodes (2014, 2017) |
| 2015 | Saving Hope | Lane Berkley | Recurring role; 6 episodes |
| 2015 | Kept Woman | Simon | Television film |
| 2016 | Inhuman Condition | William "Will" Bader | Recurring role; 10 episodes |
| 2016 | The Girlfriend Experience | Ryan | 4 episodes |
| 2016 | Gangland Undercover | Crowbar | Season 2; 8 episodes |
| 2016 | Channel Zero: Candle Cove | Gary Yolen | Main role |
| 2017 | Frontier | Monaghan | Episode: "Mutiny" |
| 2018 | Killjoys | The Hunter | Episode: "Baby, Face Killer" |
| 2018 | Prescription for Danger | Dr. Mark Laurie | Television film |
| 2019 | Ransom | Dr. Dolan Kendrick | Episode: "Story for Another Day" |
| 2019 | Frankie Drake Mysteries | James Barton | Episode: "No Friends Like Old Friends" |
| 2019, 2024 | The Boys | Ezekiel | 5 episodes |
| 2020 | Tiny Pretty Things | Topher Brooks | 8 episodes |
| 2021 | Murdoch Mysteries | Anthony Quivell / Owen McCall | Episode: "Love or Money" |
| 2022–2024 | Billy the Kid | John Riley | Recurring role; 11 episodes |
| 2023 | Mayans M.C. | McKenzie | 2 episodes |
| 2023 | Slasher | Alistair Simcoe | 5 episodes |
| 2023 | Hudson & Rex | Tom McGimsie | Episode: "Working for the Weekend" |
