= Grimm's Snow White =

2012 American fantasy film

- Directed by: Rachel Lee Goldenberg
- Screenplay by: Naomi Selfman
- Based on: Snow White by Brothers Grimm
- Produced by: David Michael Latt; David Rimawi; Paul Bales
- Starring: Jane March; Eliza Bennett; Jamie Thomas King; Otto Jankovich; Ben Maddox; Sebastian Wimmer; Alan Burgon; Frauke Steiner; Sabine Kranzelbinder; Eric Lomas; Klara Steinhauser; Eberghard Wagner; Bernhard Georg Rusch; Lukas Johne
- Cinematography: Alex Yellen
- Music by: Chris Ridenhour
- Production company: The Asylum
- Distributed by: The Asylum
- Release date: February 14, 2012
- Running time: 90 minutes
- Country: United States
- Language: English

Grimm's Snow White is a 2012 American fantasy film produced by The Asylum and directed by Rachel Lee Goldenberg. Loosely based on the Brothers Grimm fairy tale Snow White, the film stars Jane March, Eliza Bennett and Jamie Thomas King.

== Plot ==
Long ago, a meteor crashed into Earth where it burned eternally and became known as the Viridian Flame and the ultimate source of power. The flame begat two races; dragons, the defenders of the flame, and elves, the guardians of the flame. The elves each carried a stone which holds the power of the flame and gives them power, but most of the elves integrated into the human kingdoms to live normal lives. The humans however, began enslaving the elves for their power which caused unrest in the kingdoms leaving many to look toward the prophecy of “the mighty luminary” who will unite the land and bring peace for 1000 years.

Many years later, the story of the Viridian Flame has become a myth in the neighboring kingdoms of military powerhouse Whitevale and Northfalia, which according to legend has the Viridian Flame somewhere on its land. Princess Snow White of Whitevale has just returned to her kingdom upon the death of her father, having spent the last several years at a convent. Her father just signed a peace treaty between the kingdoms and Prince Alexander of Northfalia is coming to pay his respects to the King, where he meets Snow White. Snow White's stepmother, Queen Gwendolyn, has several elven stones she uses to draw power from and consult her magic mirror, who tells her that Snow White's beauty has usurped her own. Furious, Gwendolyn has her Huntsman Beasley (who she is having an affair with and who helped her arrange the king's death) take Snow White into the woods with a guard and bring back her heart. In the woods, they are attacked by a dragon before Beasley can kill Snow White, and he brings back the guard's heart instead after he is killed by the dragon. Gwendolyn feeds the heart to her dogs and informs Prince Alexander of her death after he asks for Snow White's hand in marriage.

In the woods, Snow White is wounded and saved by an elf, Runt, who brings her back to his dwelling in the woods where their leader elf, Orlando, adamantly opposes her being there. At the castle, Gwendolyn starts plotting to marry Alexander so she can find the Viridian Flame but her mirror informs her that Snow White still lives. Gwendolyn feeds Huntsman Beasley to her dogs for his betrayal. She sends men into the forest to find and interrogate some elves for Snow White's location. When that proves unsuccessful, she sends her pack of massive dogs into the woods to hunt Snow White down.

Prince Alexander also searches the forest and saves Snow White from the dogs and defeats a dragon while she escapes. Alexander searches for Snow White afterwards at Orlando's home nearby but Orlando has her hidden and he turns the Prince away. Orlando worries of what Gwendolyn is plotting and asks the Dark Elves, guardians of the Viridian Flame, to help them wage war against Whitevale but they refuse. Snow White and Runt attempt to the infiltrate the castle so she can speak with Alexander but she in unsuccessful and Runt is captured by the Queen's men. Gwendolyn then uses elf magic to transform herself into a crone and make a poison ring. She visits the market, where she encounters Snow White and gives her the ring which causes her to fall into a death like sleep.

At the castle, Alexander finds a stable boy who is wearing Snow White's ring and he takes it. The elves think Snow White has been killed and preparing a funeral pyre when Alexander arrives and replaces the ring Gwendolyn gave her with her own ring which breaks the spell. Alexander's Advisor Hugh betrays him and tells Gwendolyn of her plan's failure and she attacks with her army. With the elves, Alexander and Snow White fight back and are eventually assisted by the Dark Elves. Gwendolyns army overpowers the elves, and she attempts a quick forced marriage between herself and Alexander. Snow White manages to break free and decapitate Gwendolyn before the ceremony can be finished. The kingdoms are united when Snow White and Alexander marry and peace is restored.

== Cast ==
- Eliza Bennett as Snow White
- Jane March as Queen Gwendolyn
- Jamie Thomas King as Prince Alexander
- Eberhard Wagner as the King
- Otto Jankovich as Hugh, The Advisor
- Ben Maddox as Huntsman Beasley
- Sebastian Wimmer as Runt
- Alan Burgon as Orlando
- Frauke Steiner as Mara
- Sabine Kranzelbinder as Isabella
- Eric Lomas as Cyrus
- Klara Steinhauser as Allura
- Bernhard Georg Rusch as Wally, Stable Boy
- Lukas Johne as Dungeon Master
- Mac Salamon as Captain
- Thomas Nash as Hunter Aberle
- Alexander T. T. Mueller as Priest
- Magdalena Hall as Servant
- Mathias Hacker as Harry, Human Prisoner
- Stefan Fent as Queen's Guard Solis
- Benjamin Kornfeld as Queen's Guard Berkley
- Marcus Schramm as Queen's Guard Savage
- Stefan Kurt Reiter as Queen's Guard Rolins
- David Heissig as Wood Elf
- Sonja Chan as Dark Elf #1
- Lucius Wolter as Dark Elf #2
- David Szalai as Dark Elf #3
- Sarah Xiao Mingruber as Dark Elf #4
- Enis Bunjaku as Elf

== Production ==
The film was shot on location in and around Vienna, Austria.

== Release ==
Grimm's Snow White was released on video-on-demand, DVD, and Blu-ray on February 14, 2012.

== Reception ==
Grantland said in an editorial on The Asylum that "Grimm’s Snow White, it turns out, does well enough. The story is adequate, the set design is strong, and star Jane March gives a commendably icy performance. Those virtues coexist alongside Prince Alexander fighting giant, terribly rendered CGI dogs, but they’re virtues nonetheless."

== See also ==
- Mirror Mirror, another 2012 film based on the tale of Snow White.
- Snow White and the Huntsman, another 2012 film based on the tale of Snow White.
- Blancanieves, a Spanish film also released on 2012 based on the tale of Snow White.
- Snow White: A Deadly Summer, an horror film also released on 2012 inspired by the tale of Snow White.
- List of films about witchcraft
