= Jamie Thomas King =

British actor (born 1981)

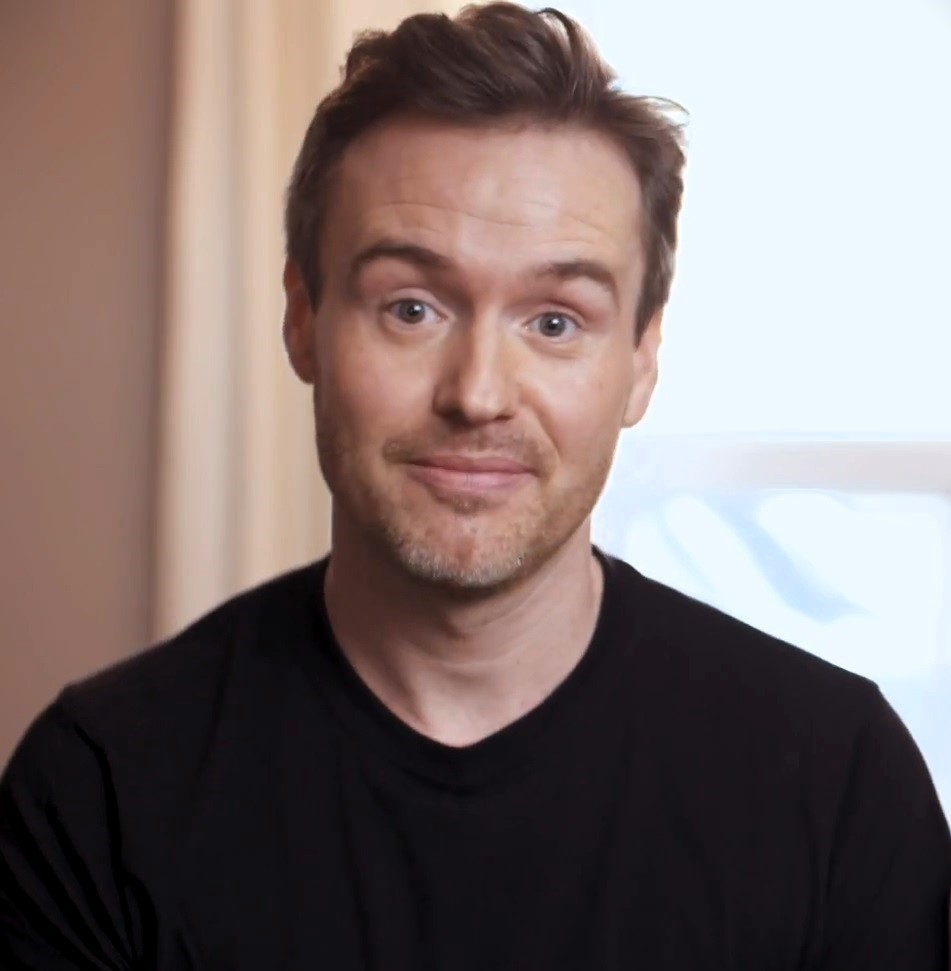
- King in 2019
- Born: 9 July 1981 (age 45); London, England
- Education: London Academy of Music and Dramatic Art
- Occupation: Actor
- Years active: 2002–present
- Spouse: Tamara Podemski

Thomas Edward James King (born 9 July 1981), known professionally as Jamie Thomas King, is an English actor, best known for playing poet Thomas Wyatt in the television series The Tudors.

== Early life ==
King was born in London and is the son of American screenwriter Laura Lamson and English television director Christopher King. He was educated at Dulwich College, Fine Arts College and the London Academy of Music and Dramatic Art.

== Career ==
King began his acting career in the theatre in the Royal National Theatre's production of Alan Bennett's The History Boys. He has acted extensively in American and European film and television productions. He is best known for playing poet Thomas Wyatt in the television series The Tudors.

In 2024, he starred in the short film The Light Before the Sun, which marked both the debut release from his Blackbird Productions studio and his first credit as a screenwriter. In 2026, he received a Canadian Screen Award nomination for Best Performance in a Live Action Short Drama at the 14th Canadian Screen Awards for the film.

== Personal life ==
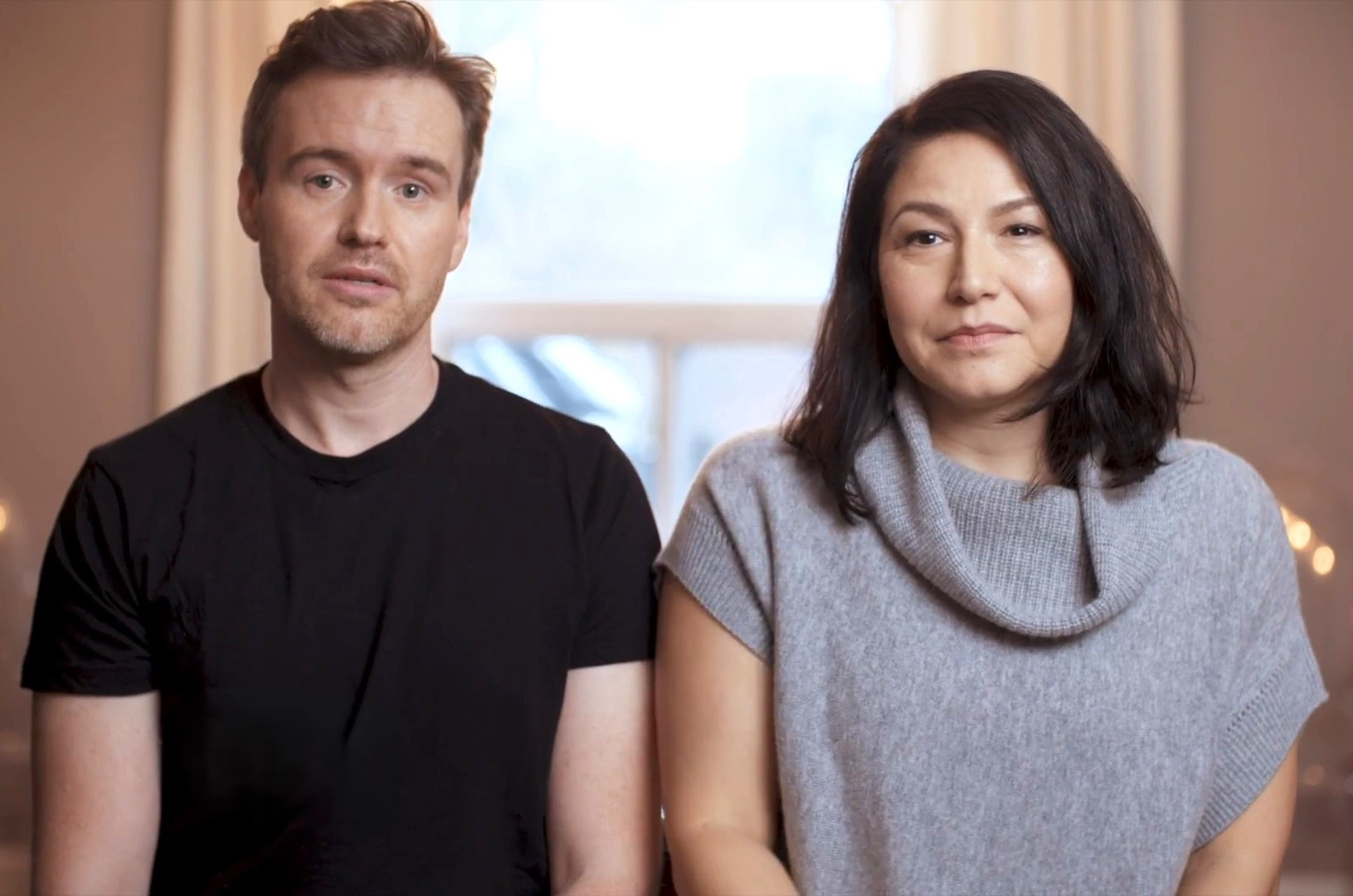
King and Tamara Podemski in 2019

He is married to Canadian actress Tamara Podemski, with whom he launched the Blackbird Productions studio.

In 2016, Podemski gave birth to their second child Benjamin, who died just five days after birth, in Bath. A coroner's investigation later determined that the death was due to brain damage caused when a hospital delayed Podemski's caesarean section. The experience later inspired him to write a screenplay adaptation of James Titcombe's book Joshua's Story: Uncovering the Morecambe Bay NHS Scandal, about Titcombe's own experience having a child die in infancy due to failures in the management of the National Health Service, which is planned for future release through Blackbird.

== Filmography ==
=== Film ===
Year	Title	Role	Notes
2005	The River King	Harry McKenna	
2006	Tristan & Isolde	Anwick	
2006	Vampire Diary	Adam	
2011	Like Crazy	Elliot	
2011	The Legend of Hell's Gate: An American Conspiracy	John Henry 'Doc' Holliday	
2011	Tinker Tailor Soldier Spy	Kaspar	
2012	Grimm's Snow White	Prince Alexander	Video
2012	Storage 24	Chris	
2012	Tower Block	Ryan	
2014	Mr. Turner	David Robert	
2022	A Match for the Prince	Prince Maximillian "Max" Lucien Adalwolf	Movie
2024	The Light Before the Sun	Daniel Wolf	Short film; also writer

=== Television ===
Year	Title	Role	Notes
2001	Shades	Josh MacIntyre	"1.6"
2003	Bad Girls	Tony	Recurring role
2003	Midsomer Murders	Steven Curtis	"The Green Man"
2004	Casualty	Jamie Canning	"A Life Lost"
2007–08	The Tudors	Thomas Wyatt	Recurring role (series 1–2)
2008	The Cleaner	Chris	"The Eleventh Hour"
2008	Lost City Raiders	Thomas Kubiak	TV film
2008	CSI: Miami	Dennis Chilton	"Power Trip"
2009	Private Practice	Brandon Henry	"What Women Want"
2009	Mad Men	Guy Mackendrick	"Guy Walks Into an Advertising Agency"
2010	Day One	Hugh	TV film
2011	Marchlands	Paul Bowen	TV miniseries
2013	Call the Midwife	Douglas Roberts	"2.4"
2013	Air Force One Is Down	Steven Featherstone	TV miniseries
2014	Gunpowder 5/11: The Greatest Terror Plot	Thomas Wintour	TV documentary
2017	Murdoch Mysteries	Dr. Bertram Lennox	"The Canadian Patient" (S11 ep4)
2018	The Originals	August Muller	"5.5"
2022	Murdoch Mysteries	Ernest Castle/King George V	"Honeymoon in Hampshire" (S16 ep9)
