= Amy Jones (writer) =

Canadian writer

Amy Jones is a Canadian writer, whose debut novel We're All in This Together was a shortlisted finalist for the Stephen Leacock Memorial Medal for Humour in 2017.

Jones was a finalist for the Bronwen Wallace Memorial Award for emerging writers in 2005, and won the CBC Literary Award for Short Fiction in 2006. Her debut short story collection, What Boys Like, won the 2008 Metcalf-Rooke Award and was a finalist for the 2010 ReLit Award for short fiction.

in 2020, filming began on the screen adaptation of We're All in This Together, directed by and starring Katie Boland who also wrote the screenplay. The film also stars Martha Burns and Alisha Newton.

Originally from Halifax, Nova Scotia, Jones was based in Thunder Bay, Ontario, for several years as a creative writing instructor at Lakehead University. She currently resides in Toronto.

Her second novel, Every Little Piece of Me, was published in 2019.
