= Diane D'Aquila =

American-Canadian actress (born 1952)

- Born: October 23, 1952 (age 73); Cedar Rapids, Iowa, U.S.
- Occupation: Actress
- Spouse: C. David Johnson (m. 1987–1992)

Diane D'Aquila (born October 23, 1952) is an American-Canadian actress. She has appeared in both television and film roles, but is best known for her stage appearances at the Stratford Festival.

== Early life ==
Born in Cedar Rapids, Iowa, D'Aquila was raised in Minneapolis. She spent much of her adult life and career in Canada and holds dual citizenship.

== Career ==
D'Aquila originated the role of Elizabeth I of England in Timothy Findley's play, Elizabeth Rex. She won both an ACTRA Award and a Gemini Award in 2005 for her performance in the play's television adaptation.

In 2009, she played Mary Mercer in Soulpepper's revival of David French's Of the Fields, Lately. She appeared on television and films including such appearances in Alfred Hitchcock Presents, Street Legal, Used People, The Ray Bradbury Theater, Hangin' In, Jane's House, The Long Island Incident, 72 Hours: True Crime, Milk and Honey and Slings and Arrows.

She has done voice-overs in animation including Little Bear as Grandmother Bear, Franklin as Miss Lynx, Bob and Margaret, Bad Dog, Ultraforce, The Busy World of Richard Scarry, Medabots, Roboroach, Rescue Heroes, Rolie Polie Olie, Freaky Stories, Ned's Newt, Angela Anaconda, Monster Force, Flash Gordon, George Shrinks, Timothy Goes to School, Blaster's Universe, Flying Rhino Junior High, The Adventures of Sam & Max: Freelance Police, Pippi Longstocking, Dumb Bunnies, Highlander: The Animated Series, World of Quest, The Seventh Portal, Chilly Beach, Wilbur, The Berenstain Bears, Tales from the Cryptkeeper, The Neverending Story, Corduroy, Pandalian, Busytown Mysteries, Kaput & Zosky, Jane and the Dragon, The Avengers: United They Stand, Silver Surfer and Cyberchase.

In 2017, D'Aquila portrayed the title role in King Lear at Toronto's Shakespeare in High Park, one of relatively few women ever to have performed the traditionally male role.

== Personal life ==
D'Aquila was married to Canadian actor C. David Johnson from 1987 to 1992.

== Filmography ==
=== Film ===
Year	Title	Role	Notes
1981	The Last Chase	Santana	
1987	A Winter Tan	Edith	
1988	Milk and Honey	David's Teacher	
1990	Thick as Thieves	Doris	
1991	Married to It	Madeleine Rothenberg	
1992	Used People	Rose	
1998	Striking Poses	Valerie	
2009	Caesar and Cleopatra	Ftatateeta	
2010	Good Neighbours	Miss Van Ilen	
2011	Take This Waltz	Harriet	
2018	Never Saw It Coming	Ellie Garfield	

=== Television ===
Year	Title	Role	Notes
1977	For the Record	Maria	Episode: "Maria"
1978	Performance	Brooke	Episode: "Brooke"
1983	Hangin' In	Freda	Episode: "The Actress and the Bishops"
1987	Alfred Hitchcock Presents	Ellen Powell	Episode: "World's Oldest Motive"
1987	Echoes in the Darkness	Pat Schnure	2 episodes
1988	The Ann Jillian Story	Dr. Francine Caldwell	Television film
1988	The Ray Bradbury Theater	Clarisse	Episode: "Skeleton"
1988	9B	Stella Wevers	Episode: "Relationships"
1989	Sorry, Wrong Number	Sally Dutch	Television film
1990	My Secret Identity	Sarah Wilson	Episode: "Misfire"
1990	Street Legal	Noreen Masters	Episode: "The Psychic"
1992	Last Wish	Maryanne	Television film
1992	Black Death	Nurse Daniels	Television film
1992	Heritage Minutes	Agnes Macphail	Episode: "Agnes Macphail"
1993	E.N.G.	Marcia Stanfield	Episode: "The Big Sleepover"
1993–97	The Busy World of Richard Scarry	Voice	36 episodes
1994	Jane's House	Marion	Television film
1994	Mary Silliman's War	Abby Nash	Television film
1994	The Forget-Me-Not Murders	Alexis	Television film
1995	A Family Divided	Inez Frank	Television film
1995	The Possession of Michael D.	Charlotte	Television film
1995–2001	Little Bear	Grandmother Bear (voice)	17 episodes
1995	Ultraforce	Ruth Green	Episode: "Prime Time"
1996	Beyond the Call	Angela	Television film
1997	The Last Don	Sophia Ballazzo	2 episodes
1997	Freaky Stories	Narrator	Episode: "Not the Waltons"
1998	The Long Island Incident	Dr. Ellen Lipsky	Television film
1998	Franklin	Miss Lynx	Episode: "Franklin Takes a Trip/Franklin's Bicycle Helmet"
1999	Family of Cops 3	Orientation Cop	Television film
1999	Traders	Michaela	Episode: "Every Secret Thing"
2001	George Shrinks	Edna Bellbottom (voice)	Episode: "The More Things Change"
2002	Two Against Time	Dr. Wilmer	Television film
2003–05	72 Hours: True Crime	Narrator	21 episodes
2004	Elizabeth Rex	Queen Elizabeth	Television film
2005–06	Slings & Arrows	Minister of Culture	3 episodes
2007	Booky and the Secret Santa	Mrs. Eaton	Television film
2014	Saving Hope	Ida	Episode: "En Bloc"
2017	Alias Grace	Mrs. Quenell	3 episodes
2019	Diggstown	Eleanor Thompson	Episode: "Delroy Nelson"

=== Video games ===
Year	Title	Role	Notes
1999	Little Bear Preschool Thinking Adventures	Grandmother Bear	
1999	Little Bear: Kindergarten Thinking Adventures	Grandmother Bear	
