= Dog Pound (film) =

2010 film by Kim Chapiron

- French theatrical poster
- Directed by: Kim Chapiron
- Written by: Kim Chapiron; Jeremie Delon
- Produced by: Georges Bermann
- Starring: Adam Butcher; Shane Kippel; Mateo Morales
- Cinematography: Andre Chemetoff
- Edited by: Benjamin Weill
- Production companies: Partizan Films; Canal+ Téléfilm Canada
- Distributed by: Alliance Films
- Release dates: 24 April 2010 (Tribeca); 7 September 2010 (Canada; DVD & Blu-Ray)
- Running time: 91 minutes
- Country: Canada
- Languages: English; French

Dog Pound is a 2010 Canadian direct-to-video psychological thriller film directed and co-written by Kim Chapiron. It is a Canadian remake of the 1979 British borstal film Scum. This is Chapiron's only film to go direct-to-video. It has since found a cult following.

== Plot ==
Butch, Davis and Angel are teenagers who have been sentenced to Enola Vale juvenile detention center in Montana. Correctional officer Sands does their initial intake, focusing on Butch, who has been imprisoned for attacking and blinding a correctional officer at another facility.

Goodyear, a tough but fair officer, urges the new inmates to follow the rules and quietly serve their time so they can earn a second chance on the outside. At first, Butch attempts to conform to the rules, but soon he and his friends are attacked by the chief bully Banks and his thugs, Eckersley and Loony.

Refusing to reveal the names of his attackers, Butch is sent to solitary confinement. Meanwhile, Banks offers Davis what he thinks is cocaine, but turns out to be poison as the trio of bullies taunt him further. Once out, Butch immediately exacts revenge on Banks, Eckersley, and Loony. Butch saves the worst for Banks, who is savagely beaten. The beatings establish his rank among the inmates and offers temporary protection to his friends, Davis and Angel.

During a routine painting job, Angel and Goodyear get into a physical altercation; Angel is thrown against the wall by Goodyear - striking his head against some pipes and later dies at the hospital. Butch, who was a witness to the altercation, is placed in solitary confinement while an investigation takes place.

Without Butch's protection, Davis is raped by Loony and Eckersley. Davis tries to contact his mother during the night, but an officer denies his request, telling him he'll have to wait until morning. Feeling helpless, Davis goes back to his bunk, committing suicide by slitting his wrists.

The deaths of both Angel and Davis result in their dormitory going on a hunger strike during breakfast. After a stare-down in the cafeteria where tempers flare, Butch loses control, throws a chair and instigates a full blown prison riot where he brutally attacks Loony. The detention officers are overwhelmed and return to the cafeteria in riot gear, using tear gas and plastic bullets in an attempt to end the riot.

During the riot, Butch tries to escape the building. However, he is caught by the detention officers who cripple his right-leg with a baton. Butch screams in agony as they drag him back inside the building.

== Cast ==
- Adam Butcher as Butch
- Shane Kippel as Davis
- Mateo Morales as Angel Ortiz
- Slim Twig as Max
- Taylor Poulin as Banks
- Dewshane Williams as Frank
- Lawrence Bayne as Officer Goodyear
- Trent McMullen as Officer Sands
- Jeff McEnery as Loony
- Bryan Murphy as Eckersley

== Release ==
Dog Pound premiered at the Tribeca Film Festival on 24 April 2010. It was released in Canada on 7 September 2010. It was also released in France, the United States, Mexico, Switzerland (French speaking region only), Spain, and the United Kingdom.

== Critical reception ==
On the review aggregator website Rotten Tomatoes, 63% of 27 critics' reviews are positive, with an average rating of 6.2/10. Metacritic, which uses a weighted average, assigned the film a score of 57 out of 100, based on 8 critics, indicating "mixed or average" reviews.

Writing for CinemaBlend, reviewer Perri Nemiroff described the film as "intense" and not suited to the tastes of all viewers.

== Awards ==
Dog Pound is French director Chapiron's first English-language feature, and the film earned him an award as Best New Narrative Filmmaker at the 2010 Tribeca Film Festival.
