= Maya & Samar =

- Theatrical release poster
- Directed by: Anita Doron
- Written by: Tamara Faith Berger
- Produced by: Robert Lantos; Julia Rosenberg; Laura Lanktree
- Starring: Nicolette Pearse; Amanda Babaei Vieira; Brenna Coates; Antonis Giannakos; Aris Athanasopoulos
- Cinematography: Christina Moumouri
- Edited by: Mikaela Bodin
- Music by: Katie Stelmanis
- Production companies: Serendipity Point Films; January Media; Filmiki; Hellenic Film and Audiovisual Center; Telefilm Canada; Ontario Creates; CBC Films; Crave; VVS Films; Distant Horizon
- Distributed by: VVS Films
- Release dates: November 4, 2025 (Thessaloniki); March 20, 2026 (Canada)
- Running time: 95 minutes
- Countries: Canada; Greece
- Language: English

Maya & Samar is a 2025 romantic drama film directed by Anita Doron, with the script being written by Tamara Faith Berger. A Canadian-Greek co-production, the film, set in Athens, follows Maya and Samar, who, after meeting, have an affair that causes things to spiral out of control, exposing their cultures.

The film premiered at the Thessaloniki International Film Festival on November 4, 2025, and was released in Canada on March 20, 2026.

== Synopsis ==
After Maya, a journalist at an indie website, and Samar, a queer Afghan who arrived in Greece after escaping from the Taliban, meet together, their life spirals out of control which exposes their cultures.

== Cast ==
- Nicolette Pearse as Maya
- Amanda Babaei Vieira as Samar
- Brenna Coates as Rebecca
- Antonis Giannakos as Yan
- Aris Athanasopoulos as Alex

== Production ==
Anita Doron directed the romantic drama film, with Tamara Faith Berger writing the script. It is a Canadian-Greek co-production. Principal photography began in Athens and Toronto in September 2024, and wrapped the next month, with Christina Moumouri serving as the cinematographer. Robert Lantos produced the film under his Serendipity Point Films production company, and Julia Rosenberg under her January Media production company. Laura Lanktree, Steve Solomos, and Nikolas Alavanos co-produced the film, with the latter producing under his Filmiki production company. Anant Singh served as an executive producer under his Distant Horizon production company. Harry Grivakis, Ernie Grivakis, Javi Hernandez, and Claire Peace-McConnell served as co-executive producers under the VVS Films banner. Konstantinos Skourletis designed the costumes for the film. Katie Stelmanis composed the score for the film. Mikaela Bodin edited the film. The film was produced in association with Telefilm Canada, Greek Film Centre, Distant Horizon, Bell Media, CBC, Ontario Creates, and the Harold Greenberg Fund, with the support of EKOME.

== Release ==
The film premiered at the Thessaloniki International Film Festival on November 4, 2025. The film was released in Canada on March 20, 2026. VVS Films distributed the film in Canada, while Distant Horizon handled the international sales. Quiver Distribution acquired American distribution rights, setting a VOD release date for September 4, 2026.

=== MPA rating ===
The film was rated NC-17 by the Motion Picture Association for "sexual content/graphic nudity", and was featured on the 7/16/2025 MPA/CARA rating bulletin. The director of the film disagreed with the decision from the MPA to give the film an NC-17, despite the film being a love story.
