= The Lesser Blessed (film) =

- Directed by: Anita Doron
- Written by: Anita Doron (screenplay); Richard Van Camp (novel)
- Produced by: Christina Piovesan
- Starring: Joel Evans; Chloe Rose; Kiowa Gordon; Benjamin Bratt; Tamara Podemski
- Cinematography: Brendan Steacy
- Edited by: Geoff Ashenhurst
- Music by: Paul Intson
- Distributed by: Monterey Media (USA); E1 Films (Canada)
- Release date: 2012
- Running time: 86 minutes
- Country: Canada
- Language: English
- Budget: C$2.2 million

The Lesser Blessed is a Canadian drama film, released in 2012. The film was written and directed by Anita Doron and is based on the novel of the same name by Richard Van Camp, the film stars Joel Evans as Larry Sole, a young Tłı̨chǫ teenager living in the Northwest Territories. The film's cast also includes Chloe Rose, Kiowa Gordon, Benjamin Bratt, Dylan Cook and Tamara Podemski. Despite being set in the Northwest Territories, the film was shot in Sudbury, Ontario.

The film premiered at the imagineNATIVE Film + Media Arts Festival in 2012 to critical acclaim. Doron garnered a Canadian Screen Award nomination for Best Adapted Screenplay at the 1st Canadian Screen Awards. The film later screened at the Toronto International Film Festival in 2012.

== Plot ==
The film follows a shy teenager living in a remote community in the Northwest Territories of Canada, while dealing with life as a high school student. The film explores several teen-focused issues, such as alienation and the search for one's own identity, but in this case from the perspective of a Dogrib Indian who struggles between his Native ancestry and finding his place in to the modern world.

== Cast ==
- Benjamin Bratt as Jed
- Joel Evans as Larry Sole
- Kiowa Gordon as Johnny Beck
- Chloe Rose as Juliet Hope
- Adam Butcher as Darcy McManus
- Krista Bridges as Auntie
- Tamara Podemski as Verna Sole
- Spencer Van Wyck as Kevin Garner
- Dylan Cook as Mustache Sammy
- Jacob Neayem as Clarence Jerome

== Release ==
In February 2013, Monterey Media brought the United States distribution rights from Entertainment One. The film was released in Toronto on May 31, 2013, and in Montréal, Winnipeg, Edmonton and Ottawa the week after. The film was released in the United States on home entertainment (DVD and Video on Demand) on June 25, 2013.

== Accolades ==
Doron garnered a Canadian Screen Award nomination for Best Adapted Screenplay at the 1st Canadian Screen Awards. Kiowa Gordon won best supporting actor at American Indian Film Festival for his role in the film.
