= The Light Before the Sun =

2024 Canadian short film directed by Michael Greyeyes

- Directed by: Michael Greyeyes
- Written by: Rob Baker; Jamie Thomas King; Tamara Podemski
- Produced by: Tamara Podemski
- Starring: Jamie Thomas King; Rick Roberts; Tamara Podemski
- Cinematography: Guy Godfree
- Edited by: Christopher John Malanchen
- Music by: Deanna H. Choi
- Production company: Blackbird Productions
- Release date: October 26, 2024 (Hamilton)
- Running time: 33 minutes
- Country: Canada
- Language: English

The Light Before the Sun is a Canadian short drama film, directed by Michael Greyeyes and released in 2024. The film stars Jamie Thomas King as Daniel Wolf, a self-help guru who returns home from an international book tour to an empty house because his wife Amanda (Tamara Podemski) is away, and is drawn into his own self-destructive patterns when his estranged friend Freddie (Rick Roberts) arrives for a visit.

The cast also includes Jennifer Podemski, Karen LeBlanc, Tony Nappo and Tattiawna Jones in supporting roles.

The film was written by King and Tamara Podemski with Rob Baker, and was produced as the first film by Blackbird Productions, King's and Podemski's new production firm.

It premiered in October 2024 at the Hamilton Film Festival.

== Awards ==
Award	Date of ceremony	Category	Recipient	Result	Ref.
ACTRA Toronto Awards	2025	Outstanding Performance, Male	Rick Roberts	Won	
Canadian Screen Awards	2026	Best Performance in a Live Action Short Drama	Jamie Thomas King	Nominated	
