= Terminal City (TV series) =

- Created by: Angus Fraser
- Starring: Maria del Mar; Gil Bellows; Paul Soles; Jane McLean; Bill Mondy; Michael Eklund; Katie Boland; Adam Butcher; Ross Birchall; Nico McEown; Nakul Kapoor; Andrew McIlroy
- Country of origin: Canada
- No. of episodes: 10

Production
- Executive producers: Angus Fraser; Jayme Pfahl; Gordon Mark (producer); Harold Lee Tichenor (consulting)
- Production location: Victoria, British Columbia
- Running time: 50 minutes

Original release
- Network: The Movie Network; Movie Central
- Release: October 17 – December 19, 2005

Terminal City is a Canadian miniseries about a woman (Maria del Mar) diagnosed with breast cancer. She's brought in to star on a failing reality television show, turning it into a hit as her life and body begin to change.

Created by Angus Fraser, Terminal City is a daring blend of comedy and drama inspired by Fraser’s near-death experience and his mother’s battle with cancer. Filmed in Victoria, the series weaves themes of breast cancer and reality TV, focusing on life and humor in the face of mortality. Maria del Mar’s unfiltered audition secured her the lead role, which she found emotionally challenging as the demands of her character pushed her into intense and vulnerable territory. Gil Bellows described his portrayal of her husband as a deeply resonant exploration of love and loss.

Terminal City has received widespread acclaim for its bold storytelling, emotional depth, and nuanced performances. Critics have praised its ability to tackle complex themes such as cancer, family, and mortality with a mix of sharp humor and raw honesty. Maria del Mar's portrayal of Katie Sampson has been universally celebrated for its charisma and authenticity, while Gil Bellows' performance as her supportive husband has been noted for its depth and emotional resonance. The series is lauded for its unique blend of absurdist humor, poignant family dynamics, and incisive commentary on reality TV, making it a standout in contemporary drama.

The show has also been recognized with numerous accolades. It won several Leo Awards, including Best Dramatic Series, Best Screenwriting, and Best Direction. At the Gemini Awards, Gil Bellows received a nomination for Best Performance in a Leading Role, while Paul Soles won Best Supporting Actor. Maria del Mar earned the ACTRA Award for Outstanding Female Performance.

== Premise ==
Fraser's plot follows a family woman who finds she has cancer and becomes the star of a reality show simultaneously.

== Cast ==
- Maria del Mar - Katie
- Gil Bellows - Ari
- Paul Soles - Saul
- Jane McLean - Jane
- Nakul Kapoor - Yash
- Katie Boland - Sarah
- Adam Butcher - Nicky
- Nico McEown - Eli
- Bill Mondy - Frank
- Michael Eklund - Henry
- Ross Birchall - Kristov
- Andrew McIlroy - Brendan

== Production ==
Angus Fraser, a native of Vancouver, was the director-creator, with Rachel Talalay also brought in as a director. As the writer, Fraser was partly inspired by his mother's cancer diagnosis and later recovery, and his own near-death experience when he was stabbed in the heart while working as a bouncer. Originally conceived as a feature film, Terminal City was filmed in Victoria, British Columbia in 76 days.

Fraser combined drama and comedy through the themes of breast cancer and reality tv, he explains "we're watchers of TV and we're victimized by cancer. But this show is about laughter before it's about breast cancer. And it's about life before it's about death. Because death animates our lives, right? We're all going to die, and I think the more you accept that, the richer your life is."

Actor Gil Bellows explained what Fraser "does extremely well is he takes moments that I think lesser writers would turn into a joke, and makes them serious. And he takes moments where they'd go serious, and goes for the joke. So you're being hit with these experiences and responses that are surprising/ I think that's what boundary-pushing subjects do, they surprise you."

Fraser had a hard time finding someone to play Katie. Maria del Mar auditioned after spending the day in the hospital with her child and an attempt to stop smoking. Fraser explained that "she'd had a crisis with her kid that night and she was trying to quit smoking so she was chewing Nicorettes, I told her to take the gum out of her mouth. And she said, 'I can't. I'm addicted to cigarettes and I can barely hang in there.' Well, she finally took it out and then she went on this hysterical monologue, this jag, about heroin addiction [not hers] cigarette addiction, and babies with large heads." The emotion that she put into it won her the part.

On working on Terminal City del Mar said "this show, more so than any other show I've ever worked on before, has the freedom to be more in your face, because we're not saddled with all kinds of network restrictions." Later in series del Mar's character lost 15 pounds and said "I'm exhausted most of the time physically. I've never been a method actor but there's no avoiding the emotional territory playing a character like this."

Bellows believes that his part as Ari, Katie's husband, was "as good and complex a role as I ever had", on the part he said "it really spoke to me, I have children, I'm the grandson of a Holocaust survivor. These shows will get people to talk about the stuff that usually sits in the back of your head spinning before you go to sleep: What's going to happen if I lose you, or what happens if I go." Bellows explained that as they were shooting tragic moments "they're heavy scenes, and you're shaking, you're fighting the tears. You go outside and you'll see crew members in the same place, feeling the same way. One of them will talk about a spouse or relative."

== Critical reviews ==
Andrew Johnston of Timeout gave it five stars, found it compelling, and said the show "prominently counts reality TV among its subjects, but its chief concerns—marriage, family and mortality—are timeless ones that are given fresh urgency by the way screenwriter Angus Fraser approaches them from odd angles." He added that the final result is "in a wry yet raw and understated drama unlike anything else presently airing."

In her review published in The Ottawa Citizen, Allison Cunningham highlights Terminal City as a bold and emotionally charged drama driven by exceptional performances from Maria del Mar and Gil Bellows. Del Mar captivates as Katie Sampson, a woman facing a cancer diagnosis with humor, strength, and vulnerability, making even the audacious premise of flashing her tumored breast on live TV feel authentic. Bellows delivers a stunning performance as her husband Saul, balancing the weight of his family’s struggles while teetering on the edge of personal collapse. Together, their nuanced portrayals anchor the series, making it a compelling exploration of resilience and human connection.

In his review appearing in The Vancouver Sun, Alex Strachan hails Terminal City as a standout Canadian drama that transcends typical television fare. He commends the series for its intelligent and authentic portrayal of a mother’s battle with breast cancer, avoiding clichés or sensationalism. Strachan praises creator Angus Fraser’s ability to craft relatable, fictional characters that feel more real than dramatized biographies. Highlighting the contributions of directors like Rachel Talalay and Lynne Stopkewich, he underscores their role in elevating the show’s artistic quality. For Strachan, Terminal City exemplifies the potential of Canadian TV to produce original, meaningful, and enduring drama.

Kevin McDonough, in his review for The York Dispatch, commends Terminal City for its daring blend of sharp humor and emotional honesty. He highlights the standout performances, particularly Maria del Mar’s nuanced portrayal of Katie, and praises the series for its ability to balance dark themes with moments of whimsy. Unlike similar shows, Terminal City avoids smugness, offering a refreshingly genuine and engaging take on complex family dynamics and personal challenges.

In his review for The Sentinel, Frazier Moore celebrates Terminal City as a deeply human and darkly humorous drama. He highlights Maria del Mar’s commanding performance as Katie Sampson, praising her ability to convey strength and wit amidst life’s cruel ironies. Moore notes the show’s unique charm in finding humor in adversity, balancing its emotional depth with sharp, relatable moments. Gil Bellows also earns praise for his nuanced portrayal of Katie’s supportive husband, making Terminal City a standout blend of humor, humanity, and heartbreak.

In his review for The Boston Globe, Matthew Gilbert praises Terminal City for its bold mix of humor and emotional depth in tackling the weighty subject of cancer. He commends the show’s ability to balance absurdist moments, like Katie Sampson’s backyard golf outbursts, with poignant family dynamics and sharp satire on reality TV culture. Maria del Mar and Gil Bellows shine as Katie and Ari, portraying a loving, quirky couple whose bond anchors the series. Gilbert highlights the nuanced portrayal of the Sampson family’s psychological chaos and the show’s gradual exploration of Katie’s reality TV involvement, calling it a droll, touching, and refreshingly unconventional drama.

== Broadcasters ==
- In Canada, Terminal City originally aired its first run episodes on The Movie Network and Movie Central in 2005, later being rerun on Citytv.
- In the United States, Sundance Channel picked up the series and began airing the series in March 2008.

== Partial accolades ==
=== Leo Awards ===
- Best Dramatic Series - Winner
- Best Direction Dramatic Series - Winner - Rachel Talalay - For Episode 8
- Best Screenwriting Dramatic Series - Winner - Angus Fraser - For Episode 8
- Best Picture Editing Dramatic Series - Winner - Stein Myhrstad - For Episode 10
- Best Musical Score Dramatic Series - Winner - Schaun Tozer and Ben Mink - For Episode 1
- Best Overall Sound Dramatic Series - Winner - Chris Duesterdiek, Dean Giammarco, and Bill Sheppard - For Episode 6
- Best Guest Performance by a Female Dramatic Series - Nominee - Kathleen Duborg - For Episode 3
- Best Costume Design Dramatic Series - Nominee - Vicky Mulholland - For Episode 8

=== Gemini Awards ===
- Best Dramatic Series - Nominee
- Best Performance by an Actor in a Continuing Leading Dramatic Role - Nominee - Gil Bellows
- Best Performance by an Actor in a Featured Supporting Role in a Dramatic Series - Winner - Paul Soles
- Best Writing in a Dramatic Series - Nominee - Angus Fraser

=== ACTRA Award ===
- Outstanding Female Performance - Winner - Maria del Mar

=== Directors Guild of Canada Awards ===
- Outstanding Achievement In Direction - Television Series - Winner - Kari Skogland - Episode 5
