= Cold Sweat (1993 film) =

- Video poster
- Directed by: Gail Harvey
- Written by: Richard Beattie
- Produced by: Ilana Frank
- Starring: Ben Cross; Adam Baldwin; Shannon Tweed; Dave Thomas
- Cinematography: Vic Sarin
- Edited by: Nick Rotundo
- Music by: Paul Zaza
- Distributed by: Skouras Pictures
- Release date: 1993
- Running time: 93 minutes
- Countries: Canada; United States
- Language: English

Cold Sweat is a 1993 thriller film about a man who lives a double life as a hitman. The film was directed by Gail Harvey, and stars Ben Cross, Adam Baldwin, and Shannon Tweed.

== Reception ==
Adam Sandler of Variety wrote that "Director Gail Harvey does the best she can with her material, but in the process, Cold Sweat is revealed as what it is: a low-budget film designed primarily for production-cost recoupment in foreign territories and homevideo."
