= Octoberman =

- Origin: Vancouver, British Columbia, Canada
- Genre: Indie rock
- Years active: 2005–present
- Label: White Whale Records
- Members: Marc Morrissette; Tavo Diez de Bonilla; Marshall Bureau
- Website: octoberman.ca

Octoberman is a Canadian indie rock music group based in Vancouver, British Columbia. Fronted by singer-songwriter Marc Morrissette, the band also includes Tavo Diez de Bonilla on bass, Marshall Bureau on drums, as well as contributions from a number of frequent guest musicians.

== History ==
Octoberman was formed in 2005 by Marc Morrissette when he returned home to Vancouver after taking time off from his earlier band, Kids These Days, to travel in Asia and Europe. He released the first Octoberman album, 2005's These Trails Are Old and New, as a solo artist, which contained songs about his travels. He subsequently expanded the project into a full band for their second album, 2007's Run from Safety. By then he was no longer with Kids These Days.

Octoberman's third album, Fortresses, was released in September 2009, and moved away from the band's earlier folk-related music toward a more indie rock sound. A video was released to promote the album's song "Thirty Reasons". Single "Trapped In The New Scene", was prominently featured in Season 6, Episode 20 of Grey's Anatomy.

The group's fourth album Waiting in the Well, produced by Jim Guthrie and Marc Morrissette, was released in March 2012 on Saved By Records.

Octoberman's fifth album What More What More was released in August 2014 on Ishmalia Records. Mixed by Andy Magoffin at Preston, Ontario's House of Miracles, the 12-song collection found songwriter Marc Morrissette ruminating about death, "the loss of loved ones, friendships, or simply the world as he knows it."

Octoberman returned after a nine year break with There You Were, their sixth album which was written and recorded after the sudden death of Morrissette's mother and was released in April 2023 on Ishmalia Records. With production courtesy of Chris Stringer (Bruce Cockburn, Great Lake Swimmers, The Weather Station), Morrissette (vocals, guitar, piano) was once again backed by Marshall Bureau (drums), Tavo Diez de Bonilla (bass), and J.J. Ipsen (keyboards, guitar). Further contributions come from Stringer (synths, guitar, percussion), Rebecca Hennessey (trumpet), Kate Rogers and Annelise Noronha (background vocals). It was described as "an emotional album that is filled with indie folk rock and alterna-pop with a fuller band sound vibe."

In 2025, Octoberman celebrated their twentieth anniversary with Chutes, their seventh full-length album. The band around singer-songwriter Marc Morrissette was described as sounding more grounded than ever—understated but richly textured, intimate yet expansive. The twelve tracks were recorded live to tape, with half the material coming from rediscovered demos and the other half from new sketches on aging, endings, and new beginnings. While they flow between perspectives they are unified by a thread of curiosity and compassion.

Guest musicians have included Jim Guthrie (guitar, keyboards, vocals), Dave Mackinnon (piano), Francois Turenne (guitar), Andy Magoffin (horns), Randy Lee (violin), Anju Singh (violin, viola), Shaun Brodie (trumpet), Jessica Wilkin (piano), Sarah Hallman (background vocals), Peter Doig (guitar), Kris Hooper (lap steel), Jason Starnes (keyboards), Mike Morrissette (vocals), Chris Stringer (synth, guitar, percussion), Kate Rogers (background vocals), Annelise Noronha (background vocals), Rebecca Hennessy (trumpet), and Ryder Havdale (vocals). Former members include C.L. McLaughlin on guitars and background vocals, Leah Abramson on background vocals, Graham Christofferson on bass and Rob Josephson on drums. Regular members are Marc Morrissette (vocals, guitar), Marshall Bureau (drums), Tavo Diez de Bonilla (bass), Annelise Noronha (guitar, keyboards, background vocals), and J.J. Ipsen (guitar, keyboards).

== Discography ==
- These Trails Are Old and New (2005)
- Laguardia (2006, EP)
- Run from Safety (2007)
- Fortresses (2009)
- Sweater (2011, EP)
- Waiting in the Well (2012)
- What More What More (2014)
- There You Were (2023)
- Chutes (2025)
