= Katie Boland =

Canadian actress

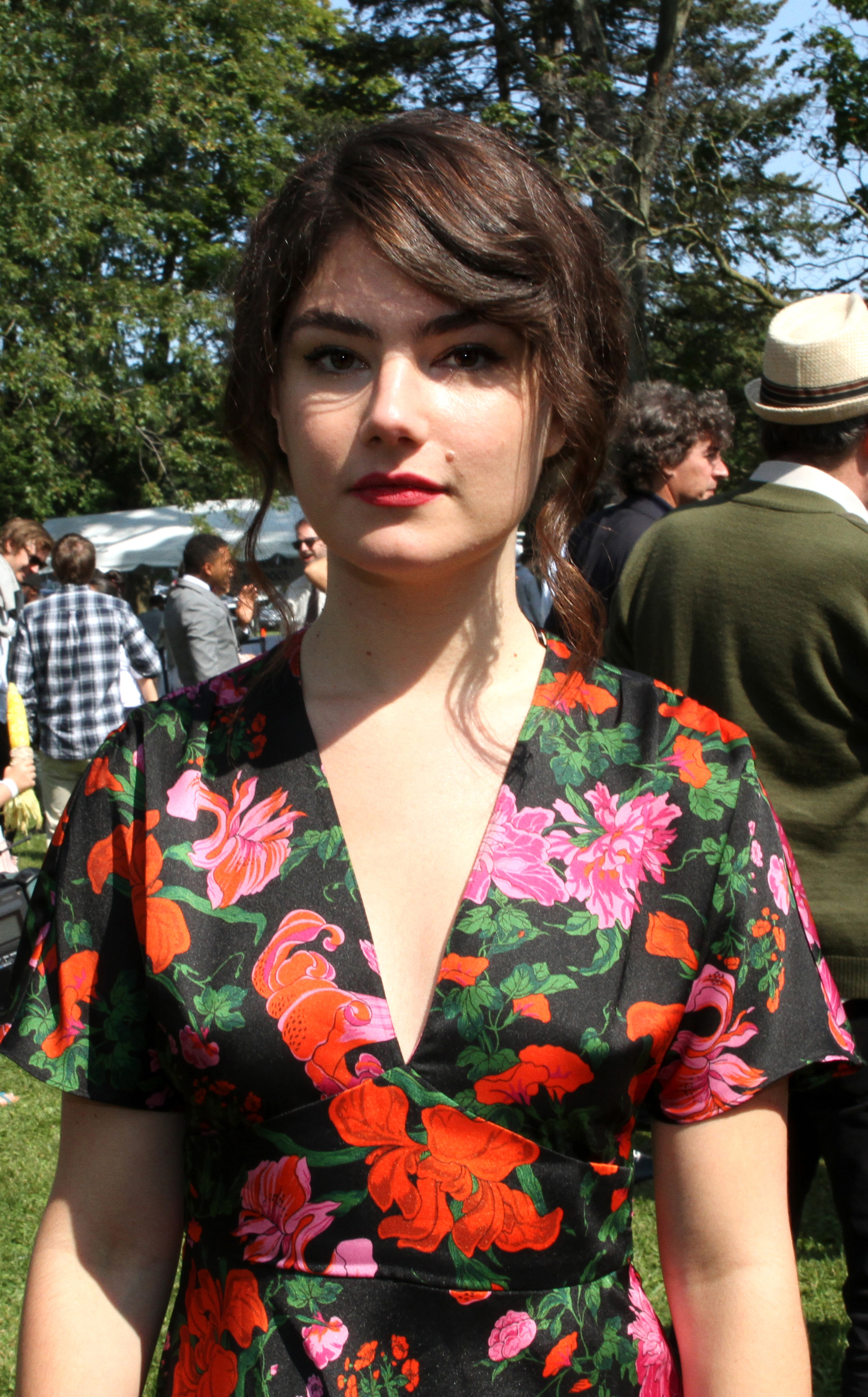
- Boland in 2017
- Born: Katherine Lenora Boland; 1987 or 1988 (age 38–39); Toronto, Ontario, Canada
- Occupations: Actress, writer, director, producer
- Years active: 1995–present
- Website: www.katieboland.com

Katie Boland (born 1987 or 1988) is a Canadian actress, writer, director, and producer. She began her career as a child actress in film and television and has since branched out into adult roles, in addition to writing, directing, and producing her own projects.

== Early life ==
Boland was born and raised in Toronto, and began her career as a child actor and her first role was in the CBS miniseries The Third Twin (1997), opposite Kelly McGillis and Jason Gedrick.

== Career ==
In her youth, Boland became well known for her roles in the Canadian children's television shows Noddy and The Zack Files. Since subsequently starred in the drama miniseries Terminal City (2005). In 2007, Boland starred as Christine in the Hallmark Channel original film The Note; she also starred in its 2009 sequel Taking a Chance on Love.

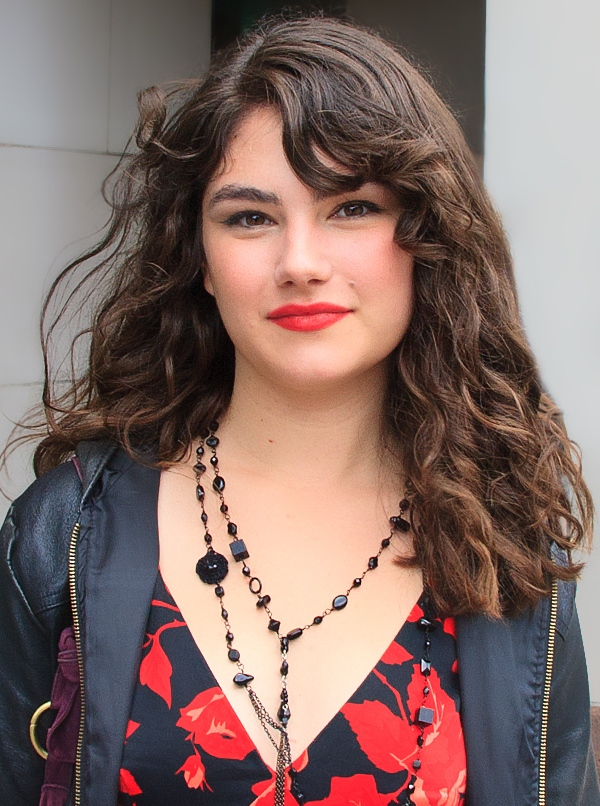
Boland at the 2010 Toronto International Film Festival

In 2008, Boland appeared in Atom Egoyan's Adoration, and in 2009, she was chosen by Elle as one of three Canadians to watch. The following year, she played a supporting role in Michael Goldbach's Daydream Nation (2010). In 2012, she was featured in the Paul Thomas Anderson film The Master.

In 2013, Boland wrote, produced, and starred in the Hulu web series Long Story, Short, co-created with her mother Gail Harvey, who also directed it. The series was filmed in the house where she grew up and was based on her personal essays "The Summer I Lost My Mind". For her role in the series, Boland won a Canadian Screen Award in 2014. She also won the Best Actress award at the inaugural Vancouver Web Series Festival, among other nominations, for her performance in Long Story, Short. Later that same year, she was chosen as one of Playback's annual "10 To Watch".

From 2013 to 2015, Boland starred in the recurring role of Clarissa on the hit CW series Reign. In 2015, Boland played a supporting role in Born To Be Blue (2015), alongside Ethan Hawke, which premiered at the Toronto International Film Festival, and also starred as part of an ensemble cast in the film People Hold On, which was nominated for a Canadian Screen Award.

In 2017, she starred in the low-budget thriller film Cardinals opposite Sheila McCarthy, Grace Glowicki, and Noah Reid. The film premiered in the Discovery section of the 2017 Toronto International Film Festival.

In 2016, Boland was awarded a grant by bravoFACT to direct and star in a short film, which she also wrote, titled Lolz-Ita. The film is about the life of a naïve but internet savvy 22-year-old who becomes a celebrity on Instagram. Gail Harvey (her mother) and Lauren Collins co-produced the film alongside Boland. In 2017, it was announced that Lolz-Ita would screen at the TIFF Bell Lightbox as part of the Toronto International Film Festival's Share Her Journey campaign to "champion female storytellers". The film was also selected to screen at the 24th annual Austin Film Festival.

In 2020, production began on Boland's full-length directorial debut, We're All in This Together. Based on the novel of the same name by Amy Jones, the film also stars Boland as twins Finn and Nicki Parker alongside Martha Burns and Alisha Newton. Boland wrote the screenplay adaptation. The film was released on 6 July 2021.

In addition to acting, screenwriting, and directing, Boland has written a novel and works as an occasional journalist for the various media publications, including the Toronto Star, BlogTO, SheDoesTheCity, and TChad Quarterly. Boland's written work focuses mainly on women's issues and relationships.

== Personal life ==
Boland's mother is award-winning Canadian director Gail Harvey. Together, they own a production company, Straight Shooters. Her father is journalist Kevin Boland and her brother, who goes by the stage name Spark Houston, is a rapper.

The documentary Paper Promises (2010) is about her grandfather Larry Harvey, a Country musician, and was directed by her uncle Shane Harvey.

== Filmography ==
=== Film ===
Year	Title	Role	Notes
1999	Judgment Day: The Ellie Nesler Story	Young Ellie Nesler	
1999	Striking Poses	Motel Girl	Video
1999	The Life Before This	Jake's Daughter	
2003	Guest Room		Short film
2004	Some Things That Stay	Tamara Anderson	
2006	Mount Pleasant	Nadia	
2008	Adoration	Hannah	
2008	Growing Op	Hope	
2009	Dancing Trees	Martha Rooney	
2009	Fateful	Nomi	Short film
2010	The Making of Plus One	Starlet	
2010	Die	Melody Chambers	
2010	Daydream Nation	Jenny	
2010	Pooka	Abigail "Pooka" Cooke	Short film
2012	Where Are the Dolls		Short film
2012	The Master	Young Woman	
2012	Looking Is the Original Sin	Anna	
2012	Close Your Eyes	Claire	Short film
2013	Sex After Kids	Markee	
2013	Ferocious	Tess	
2013	The Spirit Game	Maggie Fox	Short film
2013	Gerontophilia	Désirée	
2013	Method	Barista / A.D.	Short film
2013	A Subsequent Life	Sophie	Short film
2014	Fall	Chelsea	
2014	Given Your History	Alanna	Short film
2014	The Date		Short film
2014	Throwing Cotton	Shona	Short film
2015	The Babysitter	Martha	Short film
2015	Street Meet	Linda	Short film
2015	Hunter's Moon	Betty	
2015	Dennis	Jackie	Short film
2015	The Craft: Based on the Life & Work of H.P. Lovecraft	Sonia Greene	Short film
2015	Born to Be Blue	Sarah	
2015	People Hold On	Alycia	
2016	Joseph and Mary	Rebekah	
2016	Renaissance	Alex	
2017	Love of My Life	Zoe	
2017	South of Hope Street		
2017	Cardinals	Eleanor Walker	
2017	Lolz-Ita	Lolz-Ita	Short film, also wrote and directed
2021	We're All in This Together	Nicki/Finn	Directed/starred/adapted

=== Television ===
Year	Title	Role	Notes
1995	Lollo rosso		
1997	The Third Twin	Bold Twin	TV film
1998–1999	Noddy	Kate Tomten	Main cast
1999	God's New Plan	Lindsay Hutton	TV film
2000	In a Heartbeat	Amy	"Thing That Go Bump in the Night" & "A Night to Remember"
2000	One True Love	Laura	TV film
2000-2002	The Zack Files	Gwendolyn "Gwen" Killerby	Main role
2002	Guilty Hearts	Elly Moran	TV film
2002	Salem Witch Trials	Annie Putnam	TV film
2005	Shania: A Life in Eight Albums	Jill (13–24 years)	TV film
2005	The Stranger I Married	Tracy Evenshen	TV film
2005	Terminal City	Sarah Sampson	Main role
2006	Four Extraordinary Women	Mary	TV film
2007	The Note	Christine	TV film
2009	Taking a Chance on Love	Christine	TV film
2011	Murdoch Mysteries	Sister Theresa	"Voices"
2011	Lost Girl	Bianca	"It's Better to Burn Out Than Fade Away"
2012	The Listener	Fawn	"She Sells Sanctuary"
2013	Long Story, Short	Kristen Harvey	
2013	Cold Spring	Erin Potts	TV film
2013	Off2Kali Comedy	Kathleen	"Bisexual Date"
2014	Darknet	Kim	"Darknet 4"
2013-2015	Reign	Clarissa de Medici	Recurring; 9 episodes
2015	Motive	Nika Reid	"Best Enemies"
2015	Christmas Incorporated	Rebekah	TV film
2018	My Daughter Was Stolen	Kayla	TV film
2020	Private Eyes	Sabrina Campbell	Episode: Family Plot
