= Richard Van Camp =

Canadian author

Richard Van Camp ONWT
- Born: October 8, 1971 (age 54)
- Occupations: Writer, professor
- Writing career
- Language: English
- Notable work: The Lesser Blessed (1996)
- Website: richardvancamp.com

Richard Van Camp ONWT (born September 8, 1971) is a Dogrib Tłı̨chǫ writer of the Dene nation from Fort Smith, Northwest Territories, Canada. He is best known for his 1996 novel The Lesser Blessed, which was adapted into a film by director Anita Doron in 2012.

== Life and work ==
Van Camp attended the En'owkin International School of Writing and University of Victoria's Creative Writing BFA Program, and received a Master's Degree in Creative Writing at the University of British Columbia. He teaches creative writing with an aboriginal focus at the University of British Columbia in Vancouver and teaches creative writing and storytelling at the Emily Carr Institute. Van Camp works with Musqueam First Nations youth with the Musqueaum Youth Project.

Van Camp began his career as an intern on the writing staff of the television series North of 60, produced by the CBC. He was also a CBC script and cultural consultant for four seasons. He has published several short story collections. Most of his work is set in the community of Fort Simmer, a fictionalization of his hometown. He has also published children's books, poetry and educational graphic novels. He worked with the Healthy Aboriginal Network to create and edit graphic novels. Van Camp's writing has been influenced by the tradition of oral storytelling. He has stated:

"I need oral storytelling in my life as a listener because I'm always filtering the pauses, the slang, the rockabilly of pacing, the delivery. When I listen to a master storyteller or someone just sharing a story, I'm studying how they're talking and how they're standing, and what the pitch is in their voice. I can sometimes take their techniques and put them into a story."

Van Camp was the first Dogrib writer to publish a novel. At 24 he published The Lesser Blessed, which was later adapted for film and released in 2012. One of Van Camp's short stories, "Dogrib Midnight Runners", was re-imagined as a film directed by Zoe Leigh Hopkins called Mohawk Midnight Runners. The film was released in 2013 through Big Soul Productions. The story appears in Van Camp's short story collection The Moon of Letting Go (2009). In 2018, his novella When We Play Our Drums, They Sing was published alongside Monique Gray Smith's Lucy & Lola in the compilation The Journey Forward. The book was named as a shortlisted finalist for the Burt Award for First Nations, Métis and Inuit Literature. His short fiction collection, Moccasin Square Gardens, was published in 2019.

In June 2014 Van Camp was announced as a juror for the NSK Neustadt Prize for Children's Literature. His finalist nominee was Little You artist Julie Flett. Van Camp was the 2017 Edmonton Metro Libraries writer in residence.

Van Camp was awarded the R. Ross Arnett Award for Children's Literature for his children's book Little You. He was also the winner of the 2013 and 2020 Georges Bugnet Award for Fiction for his short story collections Godless but Loyal to Heaven and Moccasin Square Gardens, respective. Van Camp was shortlisted for the ReLit Award for Short Fiction in 2010 for The Moon of Letting Go, in 2016 for Night Moves, and in 2020 for Moccasin Square Gardens.

== Personal life ==
Van Camp is half Dogrib through his mother and half white through his father. As of 2023, Van Camp was based in Edmonton, Canada with his wife and child.

== Awards and honours ==
=== Literary awards ===
- 2013 Georges Bugnet Award for Fiction, Godless but Loyal to Heaven
- 2015 R. Ross Arnett Award for Children's Literature, Little You
- 2020 Georges Bugnet Award for Fiction, Moccasin Square Gardens

=== Honours ===
- 2022 Member of the Order of the Northwest Territories

== Works ==
=== Novels ===
- The Lesser Blessed (Douglas & McIntyre, 1996)
- Whistle (Pearson Canada, 2015)
- Beast (Douglas & McIntyre, 2024)

=== Novella ===
- When We Play Our Drums, They Sing! (2018)

=== Short story collections ===
- Angel Wing Splash Pattern (Kegedonce Press, 2002)
- Godless but Loyal to Heaven (Enfield & Wizenty, 2013)
- The Moon of Letting Go (Enfield & Wizenty, 2009)
- Night Moves (Enfield & Wizenty, 2015)
- Moccasin Square Gardens (Douglas & McIntyre, 2019)

=== Short Stories ===
- "Scariest. Story. Ever." in Never Whistle at Night: An Indigenous Dark Fiction Anthology (2023)

=== Children's literature ===
- A Man Called Raven (Lee & Low Books, 1997)
- What's the Most Beautiful Thing You Know About Horses? (Children's Book Press, 2003)
- Welcome Song for Baby (Orca Books, 2007)
- Blessing Wendy (Orca Books, 2008)
- Nighty Night (McKellar & Martin, 2012)
- Little You (Orca Books, 2013)
- We Sang You Home (Orca Books, 2016)
- Kiss by Kiss (Orca Books, 2018)
- May We Have Enough to Share (Orca Books, 2019)

=== Graphic novels ===
- Path of the Warrior (Healthy Aboriginal Network, 2010)
- Kiss Me Deadly (Healthy Aboriginal Network, 2011)
- Three Feathers (Portage & Main Press, 2015)
- A Blanket of Butterflies (Portage & Main Press, 2015)
- The Blue Raven (Pearson Canada, 2015)
- Spirit (South Slave Divisional Education Council, 2015)
- Roth (Renegade Arts Entertainment, 2024)
