= Striking Poses =

- Directed by: Gail Harvey
- Written by: Michael Stokes
- Produced by: Bora Bulajic
- Starring: Shannen Doherty; Joseph Griffin; Colm Feore
- Cinematography: Ludek Bogner
- Edited by: Marvin Lawrence
- Music by: Varouje
- Production companies: World International Network, LLC; Frontline Entertainment
- Distributed by: Avalanche Home Entertainment (Home video); Multicom Entertainment Group (International)
- Release date: April 27, 1999
- Running time: 93 minutes
- Country: United States
- Language: English

Striking Poses is a 1999 American direct-to-video thriller film directed by Gail Harvey and starring Shannen Doherty as a paparazzo photographer who becomes a photography victim herself, of a dangerous stalker.

== Plot ==
A woman tries to bury a blood-stained shirt before checking into a motel under a fake ID, 'Julie Summerfield'. She is located by two detectives who reveal her true identity, Gage Sullivan. Gage reveals she is a freelance photographer who became a paparazzo because it pays well and she is good at it. Soon, she starts being harassed by an unknown person who photographs her. Furthermore, he breaks into her house and leaves traces of his presence to scare her. Gage calls the police, but they do not believe her. She decides to focus on her job, cheating her way into a private health club where she catches soap opera star April Indigo snorting cocaine. Her assistant, Casey Roper, helps her leave the party, but her stalker follows her and takes photographs of her.

Gage hires security consultant Nick Angel to help her change her identity, hoping to get rid of her stalker. After helping her change her name to Julie Summerfield, she finds out that one of his old friends, now murdered, was one of her photography victims years earlier. As they prepare the next day to create a new life, they are bothered by Murray "Badger" Buck, a hit man who makes an impression with his psychotic behavior. That night, she and Nick break into the library to learn more about Julie Summerfield, and when they return home, Gage finds one of the stalker's trademarks at her door. Inside, they cannot find the stalker or her assistant, who should have been in the house. The next morning, Gage receives pictures of Casey being mutilated and murdered. Devastated, she visits Badger, asking him to kill her stalker. He asks for $150,000 and orders her to find a place far away from people, where the deed can be done, as well as advising her to keep Nick out of it.

Meanwhile, Nick breaks into Badger's apartment, where he finds out that Badger is Gage's stalker and Casey's killer. He immediately sets out to the abandoned house, where Gage is being scared by Badger's behavior. As Nick enters the house, Badger feels betrayed by Gage and shoots Nick. He then orders Gage to take care of his bloody clothes, and check into a motel. Back in present time, the detectives work with Gage to locate Badger. They retrieve his location, where she finds out that Nick, Casey and Badger worked together as con artists who planned everything. The detectives and Gage decide to take revenge by conning them themselves. Gage goes over to Badger's place, claiming that she received photographs of Nick's murder. As she learns through listening wire that the three con artists are turning on each other, she meets with Badger again, telling him that the person who took pictures of Nick's murder is demanding $250,000.

On the night of the money exchange, Linus poses as the threatener. Gage uses loose blanks to shoot and "kill" Linus, which she does to scare off Badger, whom she orders to leave the money and get away. With her money back, she starts to celebrate, until she finds out that Linus is unresponsive. Worried about having killed him, she takes the money and gets away. Badger, meanwhile, reveals himself to be an associate of Valerie, to whom he returns with all the money. Valerie then blows up his car and turns to Casey and Nick, who shoot and kill Valerie. Casey eventually kills Nick, and tries to murder Gage, but instead accidentally sets herself on fire. Gage is able to flee from a burning building, but does not inform the authorities, thus faking her own death. She uses the identity of 'Margaret Mudge' and enjoys her newly found wealth, acquired by the conned money, as well as her own heritage.

== Rating ==
It is rated R for violence and profanity.

== Cast ==
- Shannen Doherty as Gage Renee Sullivan/Julie Summerfield/Margaret Mudge
- Joseph Griffin as Nick Angel
- Tamara Gorski as Casey Roper
- Aidan Devine as Murray "Badger" Buck (the stalker)
- Colm Feore as Detective Linus Stahl
- Diane D'Aquila as Detective Valerie Button
- Janet-Laine Green as April Indigo
