= We're All in This Together (film) =

- Theatrical release poster
- Directed by: Katie Boland
- Written by: Katie Boland
- Based on: We're All in This Together by Amy Jones
- Produced by: Katie Boland; Paula Brancati
- Starring: Katie Boland; Martha Burns
- Cinematography: Colin Hoult
- Edited by: Jim Munro; Gabi Arno
- Music by: Michael Boland; Nathaniel Smith
- Release date: 2021
- Running time: 86 minutes
- Country: Canada
- Language: English

We're All in This Together is a 2021 Canadian comedy-drama film, written, produced, and directed by Katie Boland. An adaptation of the novel by Amy Jones, the film stars Boland in a dual role as Finn and Nicki Parker, estranged twin sisters who are forced into a media circus when their mother Kate (Martha Burns) goes viral on the internet with a video of her going over a waterfall in a barrel, and have to learn to set aside their differences in order to act like a proper family.

The film's cast also includes Alisha Newton, Adam Butcher, Madison Cheeatow, Jenny Raven, Jenna Warren, Nicole Stamp, Daniel Jun, Matilda Davidson, Matt Alfano and Sheldon Davis.

The film was shot in 2020 in Hamilton, Ontario.

The film was screened at various film festivals in the United States, before having its Canadian premiere at the 2021 Whistler Film Festival.
