= The Lesser Blessed (novel) =

1996 novel by Richard Van Camp

- Author: Richard Van Camp
- Genre: Canadian Literature, First Nations
- Publisher: Douglas & McIntyre
- Publication date: 1996
- Publication place: Canada
- Media type: Print (Paperback)
- Pages: 119 p. (Douglas & McIntyre) softcover edition)
- ISBN: 1-55054-525-6 (Douglas & McIntyre)

The Lesser Blessed is a novel by Canadian writer Richard Van Camp, first published in 1996 by Douglas & McIntyre.

== Plot ==
Larry Sole, a Tłı̨chǫ teenager from the fictional Fort Simmer, befriends newcomer Johnny Beck. The two become friends though Larry is jealous of Johnny's relationship with Juliet Hope, his crush. Larry eventually opens up to Johnny about his rapist father and the abuse he suffered under him while living in Fort Rae.

Darcy is Larry's arch-nemesis in the movie. Darcy and Larry have a past that goes a lot deeper than Fort Simmer, where they live now. Darcy knows Larry from Fort Rae, where Larry and his mom have relocated. Darcy knows the secrets of why Larry had to move from Fort Rae, and he uses this information to torment Larry throughout. Larry lets Darcy treat him like crap to not upset him into spilling the secrets he holds from the incident in Fort Rae. Darcy is also a friend and possible love interest of Larry's Crush Juliet, another of Darcy's disdain for Larry.

== Reception ==
The novel received positive notices from Quill & Quire calling Van Camp "a writer to watch" and praising the novel for its "awful, unavoidable truth."

== Adaptation ==
In 2012 filmmaker Anita Doron adapted the novel into a film starring Benjamin Bratt, Kiowa Gordon and Joel Evans.
