= Edward Glen =

Canadian actor

- Born: Canada
- Other name: Eddie Glen
- Occupation: Actor
- Years active: 1985–present

Edward Glen, sometimes credited as Eddie Glen, is a Canadian actor. He has appeared in and provided voices in films, television shows and video games. He is best known for voicing Thomas the Tank Engine in the 2000 film Thomas and the Magic Railroad. Since 1998, he has been the voiceover of YTV.

== Career ==
Glen began his acting career in 1985 in various theatre productions in Canada and in the United Kingdom, where he still continues to act in theatre to this day.

Outside of acting in theatre, he also works extensively as a voice actor in various anime and animated television shows and films, such as Odin: Photon Sailer Starlight, Dangaioh, Hyper Combat Unit Dangaioh, Gunnm, Patlabor: The Movie and its sequel, Blazing Dragons, Flying Rhino Junior High, Undergrads, Angela Anaconda, Rescue Heroes, Rescue Heroes: The Movie and RoboRoach.

In 2000, Glen became the voice of Thomas the Tank Engine in Britt Allcroft's children's fantasy film Thomas and the Magic Railroad, replacing John Bellis in the final cut of the film.

Glen has also made live action appearances in several television shows and television films, such as Twice in a Lifetime, Daydream Believers: The Monkees' Story, Earth: Final Conflict, Street Time, Skatoony, and The Frim.

== Filmography ==
=== Live-action ===
==== Film ====
Year	Title	Role	Notes
2000	Thomas and the Magic Railroad	Thomas the Tank Engine (voice)	

==== Television ====
Year	Title	Role	Notes
1999	Twice in a Lifetime	Window Washer	Episode: "What She Did for Love"
1999	Sealed with a Kiss	Ziggy the Doorman	Television film
2000	Earth: Final Conflict	Missioner #2	Episode: "The Fields"
2000	Daydream Believers: The Monkees' Story	Producer	Television film
2003	Street Time	DEA Technician	Episode: "Going Home"
2012	The Firm	Duty Captain	Episode: "Chapter Eleven"
2020	Murdoch Mysteries	Mr. Madison	Episode: "Crabtree a la Carte"
2020	Odd Squad	Conductor	Episode: "Train of Thoughts"

=== Voice roles ===
==== Film ====
Year	Title	Role	Notes
1996	The Prince and the Pauper	Additional voices	Direct-to-video
1996	An Angel for Christmas	Additional voices	Direct-to-video
2003	Rescue Heroes: The Movie	Al Pine	
2013	Emma's Wings: A Bella Sara Tale	Colm	

==== Anime ====
Year	Title	Role	Notes
1992	Odin: Photon Sailer Starlight	Akira Tsukaba	English dub
1993	Dangaioh	Rol Kran	English dub
1994	Hyper Combat Unit Dangaioh	Roll	English dub
1994	Gunnm	Yugo	English dub
1995	Patlabor: The Movie	Shige	English dub
1995	Patlabor 2: The Movie	Shige	English dub
1995	Karasu tengu Kabuto: Ôgon no me no kemono	Kabuto	English dub
1999	Power Stone	Ryoma, Pus	22 episodes
2002–2003	Beyblade	Wyatt Smithwright, Romero, Mystel	32 episodes

==== Animation ====
Year	Title	Role	Notes
1994	The Legend of the Hawaiian Slammers	Additional voices	Television short
1996–1998	Blazing Dragons	Flicker	26 episodes
1998	Flying Rhino Junior High	Fred, Johnny	26 episodes
1999	Mythic Warriors: Guardians of the Legend	Ictinus, Village Boy	Episode: "Theseus and the Minotaur"
1999–2002	Rescue Heroes	Al Pine	40 episodes
2001	Undergrads	Additional voices	3 episodes
2002	Angela Anaconda	Gordy Rhinehart	2 episodes
2002–2004	RoboRoach	Additional voices	7 episodes
2010	Skatoony	Maurice	Unknown episodes
2016–2017	Cirque du Soleil: Luna Petunia	Donnie Doohickey	22 episodes
2020, 2024	Elinor Wonders Why	Mr. Antelope	2 episodes
2023-2025	Thomas & Friends: All Engines Go	Toby the Tram Engine	US dub
2024	Barney's World	Grady	Episode: "Mel's Greatest Treasure"

==== Video games ====
Year	Title	Role	Notes
1999	The Misadventures of Tron Bonne	Birdbots	
2000	Mega Man Legends 2	Birdbots	
2007	Company of Heroes: Opposing Fronts	Alec Dillingham	
2022	Saints Row	Sanyo lleso Pedestrains	

== Theatre ==
- Lil Red Robin Hood - Marvin
- Grease - Teen Angel, Vince Fontaine
- The Wizard of Oz - Randy, Wizard
- Jukebox Hero: The Musical - Harvey, Hal, Ed
- A Christmas Carol - Bob Cratchit
- One for the Pot - Hickory Wood
- Marathon of Hope: The Musical - Bill Vigors
- It Runs in the Family - Dr. Hubert Bonney
- Darling of the Day - Bert
- Peter Pan: The Panto - Smee
- The Pirates of Penzance - Seargent of Police
- Spamalot - Sir Robin
- Cinderella - Buttons, Wayne
- Les Misérables - Thenardier
- Man of La Mancha - Sancho
- Wakowski Brothers - Conard
- The Little Mermaid - SpongeBob Triangle Pants
- Snow White - Fool, Court Jester
- Bloodless - William Hare
- The 39 Steps - Clown
- Beauty and the Beast - Burt, Spork
- Guys and Dolls - Nathan Detroit
- The Rocky Horror Show - Dr. Scott, Eddie
- Myths and Hymns - Ensemble
- The Music Man - Marcellus Washburn
- Moby Dick - Flask
- A Few Good Men - Sam Weinberg
- Evangeline - Ensemble
- Dads - Joey
- Aladdin - Beans
- Man of La Mancha - Sancho Panza
- Triple Espresso -
- Little Me - Noble
- You're a Good Man Charlie Brown - Charlie Brown
- I Love you, You're Perfect, Now Change - Lead
- A Bedroll of Foreigners - Heinz
- The Amazing Mr. Blunden - Jamie
- Forever Plaid - Sparky
- Little Shop of Horrors - Seymour
- The Bends - 3 Handler
- Kidnapped - Ransom, David
- Jacob Two Two - Noah, Fearless
