= Tank Overhaul =

- Created by: Christopher Gagosz; John Moores
- Narrated by: Andrew Pifko
- Country of origin: Canada
- No. of seasons: 2
- No. of episodes: 8

Production
- Executive producer: Stephen Ellis
- Running time: 60 minutes

Original release
- Network: American Heroes Channel
- Release: February 6 – April 2, 2009

Tank Overhaul is a Canadian documentary television program broadcast on the Military Channel (now American Heroes Channel) starting in 2007. Episodes are filmed at the Isle of Wight Military Museum as well as other organizations specializing in military history vehicle restoration and preservation.

Canadian actor Andrew Pifko narrated the eight episodes of the show.

== Episodes ==
=== Season 1: 2007 ===
Title	Military Channel Original Airdate	Episode #
"A34 Comet"	February 6, 2007	1
Isle of Wight Military Museum Managing Director Dave Arnold and his team of restorers take on the task of refurbishing a 1944-era World War II British Comet tank rescued from an army ordnance firing range. Hoping to have it ready for the museum's 2006 Tank fest, they have only 4 months in which to complete their task.
“PzKpfw V Panther"	February 13, 2007	2
Tank restorer Jacques Littlefield labors to add a rare German PzKpfw V Panther tank to his collection of over 300 military vehicles. Recovered from a riverbed in Poland, the badly mangled hulk presents an incredible challenge to his crew of experts, but also offers clues to the events on the fateful day of its destruction back in World War II.
"The M4 Sherman"	February 20, 2007	3
The Isle of Wight team attempts to pull off an unrivaled feat of military restoration as they endeavor to make one good tank out of two destroyed ones. Their ambitious undertaking involves rebuilding the damaged front quarter of a US Army M4 Sherman by welding on an intact hull section cut from a donor Sherman. The program also examines the strengths and weaknesses of the Sherman design, which while being the most numerous World War II tank type fielded was both praised and reviled.
"M18 Hellcat"	February 27, 2007	4
Karl Smith and his military restoration experts at the Tank Workshop in Tooele, Utah race against time to get a US M18 Hellcat tank destroyer up and running for a VE-Day celebration being hosted at their facility, which boasts the largest World War II vehicle collection in the US. Their secret ambition is to surprise a special guest invitee to the occasion, a US veteran who was the tank's crew commander over sixty years ago.

=== Season 2: 2009 ===
Title	Military Channel Original Airdate	Episode #
"The Centurion"	March 18, 2009	1
Featuring restoration of an A41 Centurion Tank. Fast, smart, deadly, the British designed Centurion is one of the greatest tanks of all time. A champion in Korea against the Chinese People's Volunteer Army, afterwards virtually every army in NATO wanted one. The Centurion is so adaptable that armies in South Africa and Israel are still using it. Even today, Centurion innovations live on in modern tanks. In this episode, we will meet two crews working on Centurions. The first crew volunteers at the vast Imperial War Museum Duxford in England. They have all the time, spare parts and manpower they need. The second crew toils in a small museum in Oshawa, Canada. Relying on volunteer energy and minuscule budgets, they're aiming to get their Centurion finished in 10 years.
"The Elephant"	March 14, 2009	2
Featuring a cosmetic restoration of a Panzerjäger Tiger (P) Elefant.One of the largest heaviest tank destroyers ever built, the Elephant was brilliant on paper and terrifying to behold. But in 1943, the Germans sent it into battle without having ever tested it. Under fire, the massive monster turned out to be a sitting duck for courageous Soviet fighters who learned they could disable it with a simple Molotov cocktail. The Elephant is possibly the rarest surviving tank from World War 2. Only 90 were ever built and now only two are thought to exist. At the US Army Ordnance Museum, you will see a crack team restore a rusted beat up machine that has been left on the sidelines since 1944.
"The M-24 Chaffee"	March 26, 2009	3
Featuring restoration of an M-24 Chaffee Tank. In this episode, you'll meet Joe Garbarino, CEO of Marin Sanitation, a massive garbage and recycling business in San Rafael California. Joe's true passion is his collection of military vehicles. And one of his pride and joys is the M-24 Chaffee. Fast, dependable, armed with an excellent 75 mm gun, some historians say this was the best light tank of World War 2. Every year on July 4, Joe and his team join a local Independence Day parade. But this year, somewhere inside its massive hull, the M-24 has sprung a leak - and the leak might keep it out of the parade.
"The BMP"	April 2, 2009	4
Featuring restoration of a Soviet BMP. Unveiled in the mid-1960s, the Soviet BMP was the world's very first infantry fighting vehicle – a brand new concept for the modern nuclear battlefield. The BMP was designed to protect soldiers from radioactive fallout and allow them to fight from within the vehicle. But the BMP never fought a nuclear war. Instead it fought conventional wars in the Middle East where it was outclassed by its vastly superior American counterpart, the M2 Bradley. Greg Taylor is one of the world's most experienced tank restorations experts. He's spent years trying to get a BMP brought into his backyard in the Nevada desert. But he's got an impossible mission on his hands – rebuild a Cold War vehicle without enough money or time and with only part-time help from his friends on weekends. The brutal mission pushes Greg to his breaking point.
