= Ice Cold Cash =

Canadian game show

- Genre: Game show
- Written by: Aaron Brophy; Mo Kopstik; Cynthia Reynolds
- Directed by: Robert Klint
- Presented by: Joseph Motiki
- Country of origin: Canada
- Original language: English
- No. of seasons: 1
- No. of episodes: 28

Production
- Executive producer: Mike Sheerin
- Producer: Derek Miller
- Production locations: Toronto, Ontario, Canada
- Camera setup: Multi-camera
- Running time: 22 minutes
- Production companies: Shaw Media; Architect Films

Original release
- Network: Food Network Canada
- Release: February 10 – June 6, 2012

Ice Cold Cash is a Canadian game show hosted by Joseph Motiki that ran from February 10 to June 6, 2012 for 28 episodes on Food Network Canada.

Reruns of the show on GameTV around 2017, and aired on Dabl in the United States from 2020 to 2023.

A French-Canadian adaptation of the show called Fric-o-frigo aired on Zeste originally hosted by Pascal Morrissette, and later Isabelle Gauthier.

== Overview ==
Host Joseph Motiki dresses as an ice cream seller and pedals around in an ice cream cart. The general public approaches the cart as if to get ice cream or a frozen treat, only to be told he has nothing in stock. Motiki explains that he only has cash and that there are ten questions that may be food, drink, or culinary related. The first question is for $10 and every question thereafter doubles. When contestants reach $160, they can't leave with anything less.

There were two segments in the show. The first one was where people were given a kitchen gadget or a food and asked if they knew what the kitchen gadget or food was. The correct response would get them $20. A second segment is a game of charades where one person acts out the item given to them to by Motiki.

The ice cream cart was built by Great Lake Scenic Studios.

== Production ==
According to former contestants Stella and Nancy (who were featured in the 11th episode), they say the beginning of them wanting ice cream and being surprised about being filmed was staged as they had been picked for casting beforehand. They also said that even if they were sure about an answer, they were advised to still discuss amongst each other to fill in air time, as well as having to do retakes if they was any noise interference from passing cars or planes.

And similar to Cash Cab, the money given to them was only for show, and they later received a cheque in the mail a week after taping.

== Episodes ==
No.	Title	Original release date
1	"Brotherly Love"	February 10, 2012
Brothers Jonathan and Michael fight for trivia supremacy.
2	"Cheesy Friends"	February 17, 2012
Julianna worked in a cheese store but her partners feel she's more reliable for crab questions.
3	"Play or Quit?"	February 24, 2012
In less than five minutes, best friends Teleka and Kanza go through many emotions with Joe.
4	"Parents and Daughters"	March 2, 2012
Melissa is impressed with her mother's knowledge of French word origins; a father-daughter team.
5	"A Scared Ice Cream Man"	March 9, 2012
Joe meets Deborah and Symone and husband and wife team Dennis and Karen.
6	"Ice Screamer"	March 16, 2012
Joanne is confident in her answers but her daughter isn't; Mike thinks that pounding his forehead with his fists will help generate the right answers; Linda and Vanessa jump the gun with their answers.
7	"Models are Smart"	March 23, 2012
Jen and Jess start their pursuit unclear of what's going on; Tara and John are a confident father-daughter team; David and Mike are models trying to prove that not all models are dumb.
8	"Best Friends Forever"	March 30, 2012
Hailey and Sarah's stress levels rise as the winnings get bigger; Laura and Tracey get the crowd excited with their contagious excitement; Sheldon and Julia don't drink bourbon so they must answer with a guess.
9	"Coffee and Ice Cream"	April 4, 2012
Suzanne and Dale have a vast knowledge of coffee and ice cream; Melissa and Rebecca refuse to work as a team; Rick and Barry are jokers.
10	"Human Coat Hanger"	April 4, 2012
Angela, Flo and Stephanie have an impressive knowledge of Japanese words; Hani and Brianna are confused as to how long newlyweds should keep their frozen wedding cakes; Ruth is a brainy cheerleader.
11	"Bouillabaisse"	April 11, 2012
Friends get culinary hints from algae; wine lovers are quizzed on wine regions.
12	"Tricked Out Bikes"	April 11, 2012
Garlic spreads test; bike trick experts; will rock, paper, scissors help a couple win?
13	"P'orange"	April 18, 2012
Joe asks Adam and Shannon what they are putting in their obscure drinks.
14	"Turkey Stuffing"	April 18, 2012
Something gross in a typical candy bar; Ryan and Pina's French culinary vocabulary; What happens to over-whipped whip cream; Joe turns turkey stuffing into an interpretive dance.
15	"Cuisine"	April 25, 2012
John and Raquel show off their knowledge of culinary history; Shannon worries about a question about ostrich ferns; Laura answers a challenging question.
16	"Singing Sisters"	April 25, 2012
Akim and Thanuya make a comeback with their questions; Krista, Jennifer and Leanne answer in sync; Keith and Sylvia get stumped.
17	"Chili Dog"	May 2, 2012
Jen and Liz learn a lesson about making steak tartare; Zovidar and Rudy spend a lot of time arguing; Joe tries to cajole Vicky; people act out a charade for a chili dog.
18	"Head Cheese"	May 2, 2012
Fiorella and Adam think about reuben sandwich ingredients; Lilah saves the day despite Dan being unable to spell; Nina and Carol learn how navel oranges got their names.
19	"Chocolate Milkshake"	May 9, 2012
Six-year-old twins and their mom are challenged with food trivia; Barb and Andrew get a spelling challenge; Dave gets a sauce question.
20	"Cockaleekie"	May 9, 2012
Fernando and Molly get and array of international questions; Max and Melissa learn about a vegetable; Mike and Aaron learn how to quiet a noisy dog.
21	"Hors D'Oeuvres"	May 16, 2012
Joanne and Anjana are friends who can handle what's thrown at them; Mack and Mark win enough to afford an afternoon of pints; Ally impresses with her Spanish translations.
22	"Devil's Food"	May 16, 2012
Tara and Lilly work hard to come up with some answers; Marla and Michael have an impressive degree of knowledge; David and Aaron are knowledgeable in Greek and Italian.
23	"Melon Cutter"	May 23, 2012
Geri and Sunny breeze through a variety of questions; Ravi and Yvonne know their lettuce; Laura and Tamara know all about goulash; everyone is stumped by a melon cutter.
24	"Fish and Chips"	May 23, 2012
Sandy and Priscilla know how to convert sugar to alcohol; Matt has knowledge of German knives; Jackie is confident.
25	"Cooking Time"	May 30, 2012
Chris and Meagan are smart and go far; Sarah and Nadia can't stop talking; Laura, Jim and Jay can sing.
26	"Fuzzy Navel"	May 30, 2012
Marc and Kristen give some winning answers on raw meat dishes; Rachel and Grace answer questions about Japanese fare; Adrian and Jessica know their grapes, sauces and caviar.
27	"Meat Man Dance"	June 6, 2012
Nathalie and Nicky mix French Canadian and British answers; Ella and Kim might get stumped; Lauren and Stewart do the Meat Man Dance.
28	"Popcorn and Gravy"	June 6, 2012
Kristy and Amy are twins with some friction; Vittorio and Rob get the crowd going; Chris and Demetra use a special flavouring tool.
