= Joseph Motiki =

Canadian actor and television host (born 1972)

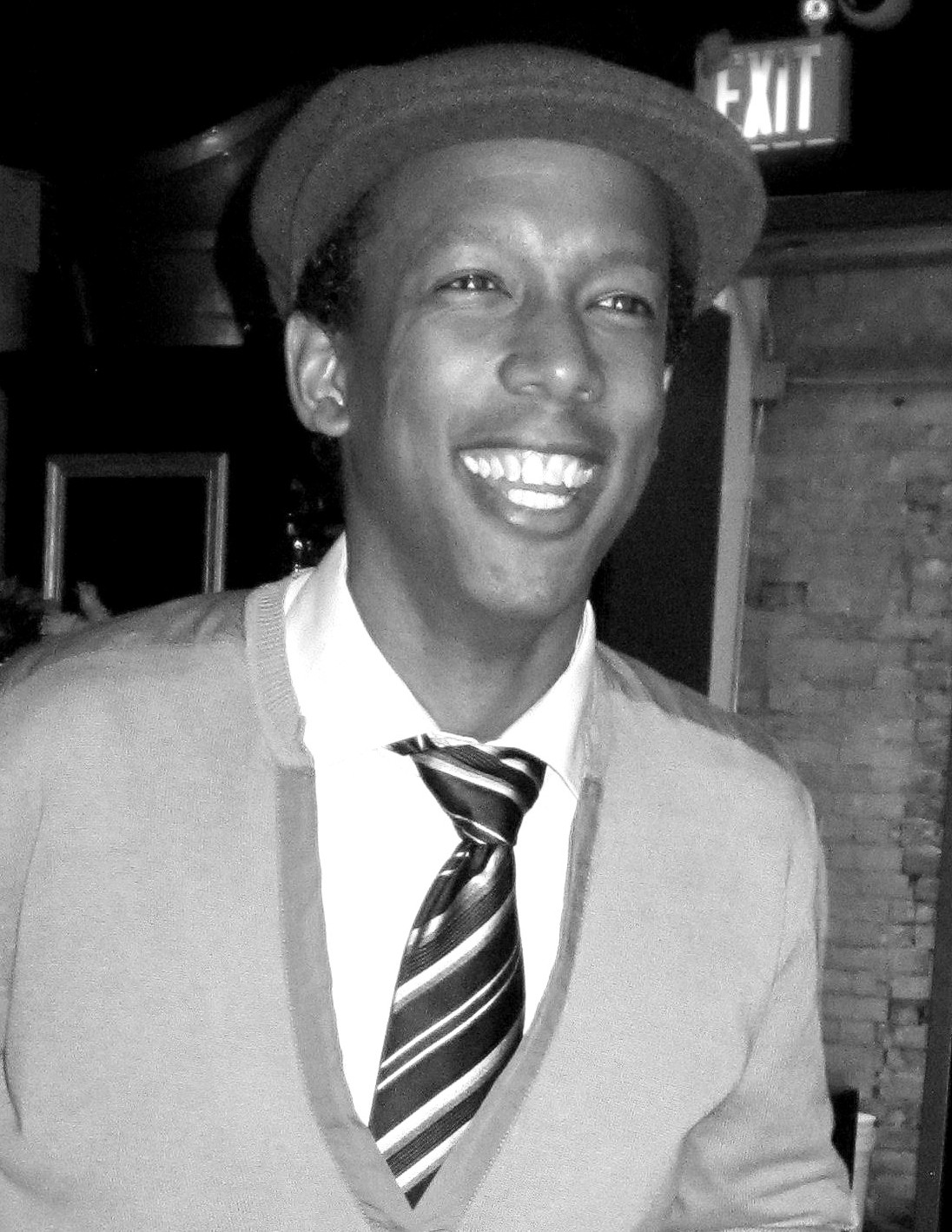
- Motiki in 2011
- Born: Joseph Frederick Motiki; July 31, 1972 (age 54); Toronto, Ontario, Canada
- Other name: Joe Motiki
- Education: Ryerson University
- Occupations: Television host; actor; performer
- Years active: 1994–present
- Website: www.joe4life.com

Joseph Frederick Motiki (born July 31, 1972) is a Canadian actor and television host. He is best known for hosting the TVOntario children's block The TVOKids Crawlspace and the Food Network game show Ice Cold Cash.

== Early life ==
Joseph Motiki was born in Toronto, Ontario after his parents emigrated from their native South Africa to live in Canada. He grew up in the Borough of East York and attended high school at East York Collegiate Institute. He was an honours student who was active in athletics, and was president of the student government. Motiki enrolled at Ryerson University and graduated from their Radio and Television Arts program.

== Career ==
While attending school, he beat out 350 people to become the host of What, a late night phone-in show for a youth audience on TVOntario. The pilot episode aired on May 30, 1994, and the show was broadcast live on Tuesday nights starting September 27, 1994, for one season. Dealing with issues related to current events and popular culture, What was nominated for the 1995 Gemini Award for Best Youth Program in Canada.

In March 1995, Motiki became co-host of The TVOKids Crawlspace, TVOntario's after school block of children's programs, alongside Patty Sullivan and Kevin Brauch. Three months later Motiki officially replaced Brauch, who left to host other shows on TVO. Patty and Joe appeared in live interstitial breaks between shows such as Art Attack, Arthur, Bill Nye the Science Guy, and The Magic School Bus. During these segments they would read viewer mail, promote TV shows, and perform a wide array of original characters. Motiki spent four years on TVOKids, appearing at live events in Ontario and helping the show achieve its highest ratings ever or since. He left The Crawlspace on May 30, 1999.

Pursuing new projects, Motiki continued to host various programs and live events. He also started voice acting in several animated television series. His first was Crashbox on HBO, playing the digitally enhanced stop-motion character Professor Rocket, both on the show and in a cycle of shorts entitled Who Knew?. He then provided the voice of Rocky Canyon for the TV series Rescue Heroes, subsequently voicing Rocky Canyon for the Fisher-Price action figures and the 2003 film Rescue Heroes: The Movie. He also voiced Metabee in the TV series Medabots.

In 2002 Motiki hosted the first two seasons of an updated version of the teen quiz show Reach for the Top, which was a high school competition for the provincial SchoolReach trivia championship. That same year Motiki became host of POV Sports on CBC, a showcase for athletes and sports both professional and amateur. During his two seasons on POV Sports, Motiki travelled across North America to cover stories and events, including the Gravity Games, the 91st Grey Cup, the historic 2003 Heritage Classic from Commonwealth Stadium, and X Games IX in Los Angeles, California. He also worked with CBC Sports on the 90th Grey Cup broadcast, the 2003 Canada Games in New Brunswick, and the IAAF World Youth Championships in Athletics from Sherbrooke, Quebec where he interviewed current 100m and 200m world record holder Usain Bolt.

Sports From The Edge is a documentary that Motiki hosted in 2004, produced by Keith MacNeill of CBC North. The documentary follows native athlete Steve Amarualik from his training in Resolute Bay, Nunavut, to his performance at the 2004 Arctic Winter Games in Fort McMurray, Alberta; it was honoured at the prestigious Columbus International Film Festival. He travelled to Asia, Australia, and Europe to host the travel show Get Outta Town on Encore with Barbara Mamabolo, a TV series about how young people live around the world. Motiki also served three times as host of the provincial Junior and Senior Championships of the Spelling Bee of Canada in 2006 and served three times as host of the Miss World Canada event. From 2007 to 2008 he hosted the YTV game show Game Gurus.

Motiki played constituency assistant Trevor Jones in the comedy series She's the Mayor for VisionTV, with Janet-Laine Green, Scott Wentworth, Denis Akiyama, Tonya Williams, and Colin Mochrie. The series, about a retired school principal who becomes mayor of the fictional town of Fairfax, was Vision's first original production and the broadcaster's second-most watched TV series during its run. He also appeared in TV shows such as Degrassi: The Next Generation and Wingin' It; films such as Blindness and Phantom Punch; and voiced characters for several animated TV series, such as Life's a Zoo.tv, which won the 2009 Gemini Award for Best Animated Series, and Rescue Heroes.

He has made numerous appearances on projects across various platforms. He played himself on the Canadian web series The Casting Room with its creator Naomi Snieckus, and was a guest on the online podcast Deekast with Derek Veenhof, where he discussed numerous subjects including his career beginnings at TVOntario.

In 2012, Motiki hosted the Food Network production Ice Cold Cash where he pretended to be an ice cream vendor who would surprise customers with questions about food and award them cash prizes for correct answers. He was the in-stadium Athletics host for both the 2015 Pan American Games and 2015 Parapan American Games; events were held at York Lions Stadium, which was known as CIBC Athletics Stadium during the Games.

In 2016, he hosted the live show CSP Live from the producers of Canada's Smartest Person. The Facebook-exclusive broadcast gives viewers the opportunity to compete interactively in challenges based on the theory of multiple intelligences presented them by Motiki.

== Filmography ==
=== Film ===
Film
Year	Title	Role	Notes
2003	Rescue Heroes: The Movie	Rocky Canyon	Voice
2006	Lie	Detective McCoy	Short
2008	Blindness	Guard	
2008	Phantom Punch	Announcer Trent Mays	
2015	Hellions	—N/a	Sound Department - loop group
2019	PAW Patrol: Ready Race Rescue	The Whoosh	Voice
2020	PAW Patrol: Jet to the Rescue	Dad	Voice
2022	Blue's Big City Adventure	Adult Bird	Voice

=== Television ===
Television
Year	Title	Role	Notes
1994–1995	What	Host	1995 Gemini nomination for Best Youth Program in Canada
1995–1999	The TVOKids Crawlspace	Host	
1999	Crashbox	Professor Rocket	"Psycho Math" show and segment Who Knew
1999–2000	Medabots	Metabee	Voice; English version
1999–2002	Rescue Heroes	Rocky Canyon	Voice; 40 episodes
2000	The 7th Portal	Ozubo Mondumo/Conjure Man	Voice
2000	Quints	Cameraman	TV film
2000	The Other Me	VJ	TV film
2001	Blue Murder	Delroy Livingston	Season 1, episode 11: "Remington Park"
2002	The Scream Team	Customs Ghost	TV film
2002	90th Grey Cup Pre-Game Show	Reporter	
2002–2003	POV Sports	Host	
2002–2003	Reach for the Top	Host	
2003	World Youth Championships in Athletics	Host	
2004	Degrassi: The Next Generation	Himself	Season 4, episode 1: "Time Stands Still: Part 1"
2004	Wild Card	Max	Season 2, episode 10: "Bada Bing, Bada Busiek"
2004	Totally Spies!	Boogie Gus	Voice; Season 3, episode 6: "Forward to the Past"
2004–2006	The Spelling Bee	Host	
2005	Spider Riders	Shadow	Voice; English version
2005	Get Outta Town	Host	Season 1, episode 9: "Sydney, Australia"; Season 1 episode 10: "Shanghai, China"
2006	Instant Star	Courier	Season 2, episode 13: "Date With the Night"
2006	6teen	Tad	Voice; Season 2, episode 13: "Waiting to Ex-sale"
2007	Magi-Nation	Ugger	
2007	Fire Serpent	Lieutenant	TV film
2007	Urban Vermin	Madman	
2008	Gotta Catch Santa Claus	Twins	TV film
2008–2009	Life's a Zoo	Dr. D	
2009	The Amazing Spiez!	Boogie Gus	Season 1, episode 9: "Operation Gus Jr."
2009–2012	Bakugan Battle Brawlers	Ingram/Akwimos/Druman/Announcer/additional voices	61 episodes
2010	Pirates: Adventures in Art	Leo	
2010–2011	Turbo Dogs	Five	Season 1, episode 37: "The Muffled Up Mess"; Season 1 episode 47: "Best Buds Forever"
2010–2011	Beyblade: Metal Fusion	Dan Sado and Egyptian DJ	5 episodes
2011	She's the Mayor	Trevor Jones	13 episodes
2011	Wingin' It	Angel Tech Officer	Season 2, episode 21: "Friday Night Ever"
2011	The Cat in the Hat Knows a Lot About That!	Benny/Big Bruce/King Cecil/Quimby/Melvin/Tommy Toad	4 episodes
2011	The Casting Room	Himself	Season 2, episode 2: "Joseph Motiki"
2012	Ice Cold Cash	Host	
2012	Super Why!	Additional voice	Season 2, episode 13: "Zora's Art Adventure"
2014	Lucky Duck	Male dolphins	TV film
2014	Marcus Level	Gorbar	52 episodes
2015	Total Drama Presents: The Ridonculous Race	Ryan	Voice; 23 episodes
2016	American Gothic	I.T. expert Marc Stone	Season 1, Episode 5: "The Artist in His Museum"
2016	Murdoch Mysteries	Colin Dunn	Season 10, episode 2: "Great Balls of Fire: Part 2"
2016	Atomic Puppet	Chief Kevlar	
2016	CSP Live	Host	Live; streamed every Wednesday on Facebook
2016–2019	Odd Squad	Mr. Lightning	5 episodes
2017	People of Earth	Radiometer Operator	Season 2, episode 8: "Alien Experiencer Expo"
2017–2019	Hotel Transylvania: The Series	Pedro / Additional voices	Voice
2017–2019	Top Wing	Oscar	Voice
2018	Miss Persona	Mayor Joe	
2019–2022	Charlie's Colorforms City	A Clumsy Silly Face/An Athletic Silly Face/Octo-Bocto	Voice; 12 episodes
2020	Coroner	Medic	Season 2, episode 7: "Monster in the House"
2020	Ollie's Pack		Voice; 2 episodes
2020	Corn & Peg	Handyhoof Hal	Voice; 6 episodes
2020–2021	Hero Elementary	Mr. Scoop	2 episodes
2020–2021	Clifford the Big Red Dog	Mr. Morgan	Voice; 6 episodes
2021	Odd Squad	Mr. Lightning	Season 3, episode 20: "End of the Road"
2021	PAW Patrol	Otis Goodway	Voice; Season 8, episode 9: "Pups Save the Treasure Cruise/Pups Save Rocket Ryder"
2022	Transformers: BotBots	Spud Muffin	Voice; Episode 1: "Mall Than Meets the Eye / (Never) Be Yourself"
2022–2023	Rosie's Rules	Calvin, Dennis, Trixie	Voice; 5 episodes
2023	Work It Out Wombats!	Mr. E	Voice; 13 episodes
2024	Lyla in the Loop	Louis	Voice
