= Game Gurus =

Canadian game show

Game Gurus is a Canadian game show that aired on YTV for one season from 2006 to 2007 where two families play variations of various board games. The TV series was taped in Mississauga, Ontario and hosted by Joseph Motiki.

== Game structure ==
The first two rounds consist of a variation of board games such as Jenga or Scrabble. A Whack-A-Mole machine is sometimes brought out, or a round begins with families having to identify artwork or playing pieces from certain board games.

The third and fourth rounds consist of various trivia questions about board games. The fourth and final round awards double the points for correct answers.

The "Galaxy" bonus round is when one member from the winning family is brought into a greenscreen room, while the other family members have to direct him/her around an oversized game board to complete their objective within the time limit, in order to accumulate enough points to earn an opportunity to win a chance at the grand prize vacation. Variations of these bonus round games include Perfection and Battleship. If the family gets a certain number of points, the family will win an MP3 player.

The grand prize was an all expenses paid trip for four to Orlando, Florida, valued at $10,000; the family will win this if they win both the semifinals and finals.
