= Norm Spencer =

Canadian actor (1958–2020)

- Born: Norman Spencer; 23 February 1958
- Died: 31 August 2020 (aged 62)
- Occupation: Actor
- Years active: 1989–2010

Norman Spencer (23 February 1958 – 31 August 2020) was a Canadian voice and television actor known for his work on Saturday-morning cartoons of the 1990s. He performed several roles for Marvel Comics characters, including Cyclops in X-Men: The Animated Series, Spider-Man, and the Marvel vs. Capcom video game series.

Before moving into full-time commercial voice work, Spencer was a creative writer in radio, most notably at CFNY-FM in Toronto, Ontario.

Spencer died on 31 August 2020, at the age of 62.

== Filmography ==
=== Film ===
Year	Title	Role	Notes
1989	Babar: The Movie	Additional voices	
2000	Bait	Bound Guard	
2003	Rescue Heroes: The Movie	Billy Blazes	

=== Television ===
Year	Title	Role	Notes
1990	E.N.G.	Policeman	Episode: "Catch a Falling Star"
1990–1991	Top Cops	John Horninek, Dick Tracy	2 episodes
1991	Katts and Dog	Additional voices	Episode: "Club Dead"
1994	Forever Knight	Man	Episode: "Killer Instinct"
1996	Due South	Agent Shorren	Episode: "Red, White or Blue"
1996	Trilogy of Terror II	Officer	Television film
1999	Relic Hunter	Delivery Man	Episode: "Flag Day"
1999	Earth: Final Conflict	SWAT Team Leader	Episode: "Second Chances"
2006	Cradle of Lies	Arthur Whitney	Television film
2009	Cra$h & Burn	Mr. Forester	Episode: "Trust"
2009–2010	Majority Rules!	Reporter, Moderator	Recurring role; 7 episodes
2010	The Latest Buzz	Boss Man	Episode: "The You're Toast Issue"

=== Television (animated) ===
Year	Title	Role	Notes
1990	Piggsburg Pigs!	Puff	Credited as Norman Spencer
1992–1997	X-Men: The Animated Series	Cyclops / Scott Summers	Main cast
1994–1996	The Busy World of Richard Scarry	Additional voices	
1995	Spider-Man: The Animated Series	Cyclops / Scott Summers	2 episodes
1995	Ultraforce	Grenade	Episode: "Prime Time"
1998	Silver Surfer	Drax the Destroyer	3 episodes
1998–1999	Dumb Bunnies	Sly Fox	Recurring role; 12 episodes
1998–2000	Mythic Warriors	Hades	2 episodes
1999–2002	Rescue Heroes	Billy Blazes	Main cast
1999	Sherlock Holmes in the 22nd Century	Trevor Bennett	Episode: "The Adventure of the Creeping Man"
2007	Grossology	Granite McChin	Episode: "Lights Out"
2008	Chilly Beach: The Canadian President	Reporter	Television film

=== Video games ===
Year	Title	Role	Notes
1994	X-Men: Children of the Atom	Cyclops / Scott Summers	Credited as Norman Spencer
1996	X-Men vs. Street Fighter	Cyclops / Scott Summers	Credited as Norman Spencer
1997	Marvel Super Heroes vs. Street Fighter	Cyclops / Scott Summers	
2000	Marvel vs. Capcom 2: New Age of Heroes	Cyclops / Scott Summers	
