= Lyla in the Loop =

Animated children's television series for PBS Kids

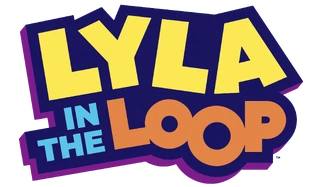
- Genre: Educational; Comedy
- Created by: Dave Peth
- Based on: Philadelphia
- Directed by: Huy Tran
- Voices of: Liyou Abere; Izzy Woodbury; Elijah Lindo; Eden Cupid; Shechinah Mpumlwana; Morrissa Nicole; Joseph Motiki; Isaac Ng; Lynea Perez; Kari Wong
- Theme music composer: Divinity Roxx; Ernest Stuart; Dave Peth
- Opening theme: "Lyla in the Loop Theme"
- Ending theme: "Lyla in the Loop Theme" (instrumental)
- Composer: Pop Sound
- Countries of origin: United States; Canada
- Original language: English
- No. of seasons: 1
- No. of episodes: 40 (79 segments)

Production
- Executive producers: Dave Peth; Fracaswell Hyman; Luis Lopez; Juan Lopez
- Producer: Jensenne Roculan
- Running time: 24 minutes (12 minutes per segment)
- Production companies: Pipeline Studios; Mighty Picnic

Original release
- Network: PBS Kids
- Release: February 5, 2024 – present

Lyla in the Loop (stylized in all caps) is a children's animated television series created by Dave Peth. It revolves around the adventures of Lyla Loops, a seven-year-old Jamaican-American girl, and her family - her sidekick Stu, younger brother Luke, twin sisters Liana and Louisa, and parents Lydia and Louis. Episodes of Lyla in the Loop revolve around the Loops family using creative thinking and problem solving.

The show was greenlit in 2020, and production began in 2023. Peth based the show on the city of Philadelphia. Lyla in the Loop is produced by Mighty Picnic and Pipeline Studios using 2D software and premiered on February 5, 2024, on PBS Kids. The series also has a podcast called Lyla's Loopcast which premiered on May 8, 2025. On May 27, 2026, it was announced that the series was renewed for a second season, which will air in 2027.

== Premise ==
The series centers on Lyla Loops (a 7-year-old young Jamaican-American girl), her sidekick Stu (a fuzzy blue hyrax-like alien), and the rest of the Loops family. The other Loops family members include Luke Loops (Lyla's 5-year-old younger brother), Liana Loops and Louisa Loops (Lyla's 12-year older twin sisters), Lydia Loops (Lyla's mother and Louis' wife) and Louis Loops (Lyla's father and Lydia's husband).

Lyla's family runs a local diner named Loops Lunch. According to Lyla, each adventure will introduce and explore foundational computational thinking concepts, leading to some comedic disasters and creative solutions, while helping others in their community.

== Characters ==
=== Main ===
- Lyla Loops (voiced by Liyou Abere): Lyla is a young Jamaican-American girl. She is 7 years old. She lives with her younger brother Luke, her sidekick Stu, her older sisters Liana and Louisa, her mother Lydia and her father Louis. Her cousins are Kamaal and Nia. Her friends are Everett, Ale, and Joey.
- Stu (short for "Something Truly Unique"; vocal effects provided by Izzy Woodbury): Stu is a fuzzy blue hyrax-like alien and Lyla's sidekick whom Lyla met in the episode "When We Met Stu".
- Luke Loops (voiced by Elijah Lindo): Luke is Lyla's younger brother. He is 5 years old.
- Liana Loops (voiced by Eden Cupid): Liana is Lyla's older twin sister. She is 12 years old.
- Louisa Loops (voiced by Shechinah Mpumlwana): Louisa is Lyla's other older twin sister. She has the same age as Liana (12 years old).
- Lydia Loops (voiced by Morrissa Nicole): Lydia is Lyla's mother and Louis' wife. She is 40 years old.
- Louis Loops (voiced by Joseph Motiki): Louis is Lyla's father and Lydia's husband. He is 38 years old.

=== Recurring ===
- Everett Phan (also called "Ev" for short, voiced by Isaac Ng): Everett is Lyla's best friend of Vietnamese descent. He is 7 years old.
- Thi Phan (also called "Miss Thi" in "The Case of the Mysterious Cake" and "Runaway Tarantula", voiced by Tea Nguyen): Thi is Everett's mother. She has the same age as Lydia (40 years old), and lives across the hall. She works at Phan's Hardware Store. She calls Everett "Evvy".
- Kibbles Phan: Kibbles is Everett and Thi's pet cat. She lives with Everett and Thi.
- Zakiya (voiced by Ajanae Stephenson): Zakiya is a friend of Lyla who first appears in "Lemonade Champs".
- Alejandra "Ale" Alvarez (voiced by Lynea Perez): Ale is Lyla and Everett's new friend of Hispanic descent. She is 7 years old.
- Carlos Alvarez (voiced by Juan Romero): Carlos is Ale's older brother who likes to tap dance.
- Santiago Alvarez (also called "Papi", voiced by Carlos Jimenez-Rauda): Santiago is Ale's father.
- Jia (voiced by Kari Wong): Jia is a woman who works as an employee at Loops Lunch. She first appears in "Stu’s Up".
- Emmaline (also known as Miss Emmaline, voiced by Yanna McIntosh): Emmaline is Lyla and Stu's friend.
- Bidzill (voiced by Leo Hynes): Bidzill is a skateboarder.
- Mr. Ramsey (voiced by Chris James): Mr. Ramsey is Lyla, Liana, and Louisa’s art teacher.
- Ms. Mercedes (voiced by Alethea Bakogeorge): Ms. Mercedes is Lyla, Everett, Joey, and Ale’s teacher who works at the Makers Lab.
- Joey (voiced by Asher Waxman): Joey is Lyla, Everett, and Ale’s friend who made his appearance in "3, 2, 1 Liftoff!".
- Kamaal (voiced by Liam Quiriing-Nkindi): Kamaal is Lyla, Liana, Louisa, and Luke’s cousin.
- Nia (voiced by Savannah Noelle): Nia is Lyla, Liana, Louisa, and Luke’s other cousin.
- Mr. Rivera (voiced by Diego Matamoros): Mr. Rivera is a grocery store worker.
- Jess (known as "Ms. Jess", voiced by Niqa Bailey): Jess is Idris’s aunt and Luke’s friend.
- Idris (voiced by Baeyen Hoffman): Idris is Jess’s nephew and Luke’s friend who appears in "Luke’s Puppy" and "Soccer Practice Practice".
- Aradhana (voiced by Eman Ayaz): Aradhana appears in "The Puddle".
- Rita (known as Auntie Rita, voiced by Yanna McIntosh): Rita is Lyla, Luke, Liana, and Louisa’s aunt who first appeared in "Handle with Care", whom the Loops had bulla cakes.
- Old Man (voiced by Izzy Woodbury): Old Man appears in "The Waffle Man".
- Yoon Phan (voiced by Frank Chung): Yoon is Sabrina’s crush and Everett's former father.
- Sabrina (voiced by Natalie Toriel): Sabrina is Yoon’s crush.
- Benito (voiced by Josiah Hughes)
- Ms. Lucille

== Development ==
The series was greenlit in October 2020, under the working title of Liza Loops, and was developed as part of a $24 million grant from the U.S. Department of Education.

However, on January 16, 2023, during the Television Critics Association Press Tour, it was announced that PBS Kids would begin its production on the series, now titled Lyla in the Loop.

== Episodes ==
=== Series overview ===
Season	Segments	Episodes	Originally released	
Season	Segments	Episodes	First released	Last released
1	79	40	February 5, 2024	June 10, 2026

=== Season 1 (2024–26) ===
No.	Title	Written by	Storyboard by	Original release date	Prod. code
1	"Piece of Cake"	Dave Peth and Tim McKeon	Kelly Erwin	February 5, 2024	101
1	"Kibbles and Coins"	Fracaswell Hyman	Albert Rodríguez	February 5, 2024	101
When Lyla's mistake causes Stu to make a mess, she and Luke need to figure out how to get everything back in order for their older sisters Liana and Louisa's birthday before it gets ruined. Lyla loses Everett's coin and tries to get it back before he comes home. Note: This episode was dedicated to Loan Ngoc Chau.
2	"The Mystery Puzzle"	Fracaswell Hyman	Lev Voloshin	February 6, 2024	102
2	"The Stu Express"	Dave Peth	Austen Payne and Carles Puig	February 6, 2024	102
Liana recruits Lyla to help put together a puzzle with over 1000 pieces in order to win a prize. Lyla and Luke make their dream of driving a train come true by constructing one they can ride in using household materials.
3	"Every Sand-Which Way"	Carleton Carter	Kelly Erwin	February 7, 2024	103
3	"Growing Up"	Joon Chung	Albert Rodríguez, Austen Payne, Lee Bird and Troy Sullivan	February 7, 2024	103
Lyla is coming up with a sandwich special for Loops Lunch, but when her siblings contribute their ideas, Lyla will need to lead the project before it crumbles. Lydia remembers her mother's vegetable garden. Lyla wants to carry on this tradition, so she and Lydia build their very own garden behind Loops Lunch.
4	"Carnival for Luke"	Astride Noel	Kelly Erwin	February 8, 2024	105
4	"Rap Report"	Genie Deez	Cassandra Parker	February 8, 2024	105
Lyla, Everett, Liana and Louisa build makeshift carnival games for Luke using household and recycled materials. Louisa seeks help from Lyla, Luke and Stu to create a beat for her school presentation on Dr. Mae Jemison.
5	"Lemonade Champs"	Laurie Rabin	Austen Payne	February 9, 2024	106
5	"Double Dutch Dilemma"	Llacey Simmons	Camilo Román	February 9, 2024	106
Lyla and Everett make a lemonade stand to raise money for the animal shelter. Lyla and Everett tackle learning Double Dutch to become a part of a neighborhood crew.
6	"The Waffle Man"	Utkarsh Rajawat	Kelly Erwin	February 12, 2024	107
6	"Loopa-palooza"	Fracaswell Hyman	Cassandra Parker	February 12, 2024	107
Lyla and Everett design a waffle costume for Stu, but they'll need to change it to withstand elements like wind and pigeons. Lyla creates an original game to reignite everyone's interest in family game night.
7	"How to Hamster"	Ruth Morrison	Andrea Mercado	February 13, 2024	110
7	"A Bad Case of the Beeps"	Crescent Imani Novell	Camilo Román	February 13, 2024	110
Luke is determined to have the best weekend ever with his class hamster. When Stu mysteriously starts beeping, Lyla and her family embark on a fun and inquisitive journey to figure out the meaning of the beeps and how to make them stop.
8	"Operation: Rise and Shine"	Dave Peth	Lev Voloshin	February 14, 2024	104
8	"The Carrot Cake Dance"	Roxana Altamirano	Austen Payne, Lee Bird and Carles Puig	February 14, 2024	104
Lyla and her siblings embark on a mission to “debug” their morning routine so they never miss the bus again. Lyla wants to learn a popular clap and dance sequence that everyone in her family knows how to do but feels frustrated when she can't get it right.
9	"Loopstastic Mess Vacuum Test"	Jehan Madhani	Andrea Mercado	February 15, 2024	108
9	"How the Cookie Crumbled"	Trina Sanyal	Camilo Román	February 15, 2024	108
When the Loops vacuum breaks, Luke, Lyla and Everett test vacuums to pick the best one. When the Loops don't have the right ingredients to make cookies, the kids set out to make them using substituted ingredients.
10	"Un-Make a Mess"	Leanna Dindal	Kelly Erwin	February 19, 2024	109
10	"Hide and Go Stu"	Andrew Blanchette	Cassandra Parker	February 19, 2024	109
Lyla and Luke clean their room with a little “help” from Stu. Lyla, Luke, Everett and Stu play hide and seek in the apartment until they lose Stu.
11	"The Case of the Mysterious Cake"	Amy Keating Rogers	Kelly Erwin	February 20, 2024	111
11	"Kibbles and Tricks"	Ian Keteku	Cassandra Parker	February 20, 2024	111
Lyla bakes a delicious cake without a recipe and needs to recreate it by figuring out the right ingredients. Everett teaches his cat new tricks using sounds and symbols.
12	"The Four Little Pigs and Brucey"	Kermit Frazier	Andrea Mercado	February 21, 2024	112
12	"Handle with Care"	Venessa M. Diaz	Camilo Román	February 21, 2024	112
Lyla and Luke playfully create and act out variations on a fairy tale. Lyla, Louis and Stu explore the neighborhood to track down a lost package.
13	"Sanitation Situation"	Pilot Viruet	Kelly Erwin	February 26, 2024	113
13	"Stu Rides the Bus"	Dave Peth	Cassandra Parker	February 26, 2024	113
When the neighborhood garbage truck malfunctions, Lyla, Lydia and Stu step in to save the day. Lyla and Louisa take a ride on the city bus and accidentally lose Stu in the process.
14	"When Luke Became Stu"	Monique D. Hall	Andrea Mercado	February 27, 2024	114
14	"Secret Surprise Party"	Carleton Carter	Camilo Román	February 27, 2024	114
After feeling left out, Luke wants to swap places with Stu, but being Stu isn't easy. Lyla and her siblings throw their parents a surprise party, and to keep it a secret, they come up with signals their parents won't pick up on.
15	"Finding a New Friend"	Marty Johnson	Andrea Mercado	August 5, 2024	116
15	"Lyla Bugs Out"	Fracaswell Hyman	Camilo Román	August 5, 2024	116
Lyla, Liana and Louisa return a forgotten tote bag by using the items inside it as clues to figure out who it belongs to and their location. Lyla feels jealous after Ale creates a project that gets her a lot of positive attention.
16	"Stu's Up"	Jennifer Cho Suhr	Kelly Erwin	August 6, 2024	117
16	"Roll n' Scoot"	Kris Marvin Hughes	Cassandra Parker	August 6, 2024	117
Lyla and Louis train Stu to help at Loops Lunch. Lyla and Luke teach Stu how to ride a scooter so he can join them for the Roll N' Scoot community event.
17	"Moon Rock Cove"	Written by: Joon Chung; Story by: Crescent Imani Novell	Andrea Mercado	August 7, 2024	118
17	"Rainbow Collection"	Fracaswell Hyman	Camilo Román	August 7, 2024	118
Liana and Louisa compete to see who's the outdoorsiest twin, but sour the family camping trip in the process. The Loops are bored on their camping trip until Lyla comes up with a game to get everyone excited about being in nature again.
18	"2 on 2 Plus Stu"	Carin Greenberg Baker	Kelly Erwin	August 12, 2024	119
18	"The Stu-Mobile"	Andrew Blanchette	Cassandra Parker	August 12, 2024	119
Lyla and Everett recruit Stu to play basketball against their moms, but they'll need to teach Stu to win. Lyla and Luke restore their old toy car to make it special for Stu.
19	"Lyla's Lucky Strike"	Kris Marvin Hughes	Kelly Erwin	August 13, 2024	121
19	"Lyla Out of the Loop"	Monique D. Hall	Cassandra Parker	August 13, 2024	121
Lyla bowls a strike her first time bowling but feels frustrated when she realizes bowling isn't as easy as she thought it was. When Lyla feels left out from Everett and Ale's thriving friendship, she plans ways to get herself back in.
20	"Uh-Oh!"	Fracaswell Hyman	Andrea Mercado	August 14, 2024	122
20	"The Puddle"	Dave Peth	Camilo Román	August 14, 2024	122
Lyla feels guilty when she causes a group project to break and doesn't take responsibility. Lyla's glider toy is stuck in a big puddle. Lyla, Everett, and Stu try different ways to get it out without getting wet.
21	"Too Many Pumpkins"	Sam Bissonnette and Fracaswell Hyman	Andrea Mercado	October 7, 2024	120
21	"The Maybe-Sitters"	Llacey Simmons	Camilo Román	October 7, 2024	120
When Lyla asks customers for their leftover pumpkins, she gets way too many and the Loops find creative ways to make use of every last one. Lyla and Luke put Liana and Louisa through a babysitting test to see if they're ready to be babysitters.
22	"Happy New Year, Lyla!"	Astride Noel	Kelly Erwin	December 2, 2024	115
22	"Everett's Summer Sale"	Jonathan Hernandez	Cassandra Parker	December 2, 2024	115
When family and friends want their own fancy pin, Lyla and Everett need to figure out how to make the pins for everyone in time for the New Year's Eve party. Lyla and Everett clash as they make a fun unboxing video for Phan Hardware's Summer Sale.
23	"Lyla Gets a Grip"	Joon Chung	Kelly Erwin	February 3, 2025	123
23	"Rappin' Riddles"	Fracaswell Hyman	Cassandra Parker	February 3, 2025	123
With the help of Everett and Ale, Lyla overcomes her fear of rock-climbing. Liana and Louisa enlist Lyla and Everett's help to improve their riddle game about everyday objects made by Black inventors.
24	"The Artist Formerly Known as Liana"	Kermit Frazier	Andrea Mercado	February 4, 2025	124
24	"Jamaica Day"	Andrew Blanchette	Camilo Román	February 4, 2025	124
Liana accidentally submits art that Stu made and she feels guilty taking the credit for Stu's work. Lyla and Luke perform an "Anansi" folktale puppet show for a Jamaica Day celebration in the neighborhood.
25	"Runaway Tarantula"	Genie Deez	Kelly Erwin	February 5, 2025	125
25	"Rainy Day, Indoor Play"	Ernesto Javier Martínez	Cassandra Parker	February 5, 2025	125
Ale wants to show the Loops her pet tarantula, but it keeps escaping, so Lyla and Ale make an escape-proof container. Lyla and her siblings are stuck inside because of rain and escape boredom by recreating park activities indoors.
26	"Miss Emmaline's Magic Trunk"	Fracaswell Hyman	Andrea Mercado	February 6, 2025	126
26	"Luke's Puppy"	Nick "Rocket" Rodriguez	Camilo Román	February 6, 2025	126
Lyla figures out how to do a magic trick with clues from her neighbor, Miss Emmaline. Luke finds a puppy and has to figure out what the puppy wants by watching and listening to it.
27	"Happy Stu Day"	Monique D. Hall	Kelly Erwin	May 19, 2025	127
27	"Judge Lyla"	Rene Rawis	Cassandra Parker	May 19, 2025	127
The Loops crew prep a Stu Day party, but Stu can't help but help people. Liana finds crumbs on Louisa's pillow and says she took the last cookie, but Louisa denies it. The twins get evidence and argue their case in front of Judge Lyla.
28	"Crack You Up"	Darnell Lamont Walker	Andrea Mercado	May 20, 2025	128
28	"Power Out Cookout"	Senibo Myers	Camilo Román	May 20, 2025	128
The Loops have fun playing practical jokes on everyone in their family. A blackout moves Loops Lunch outside causing many problems, but through teamwork, the Loops find ways to keep Loops Lunch running and customers happy.
29	"Soccer Practice Practice"	Marty Johnson	Kelly Erwin	May 21, 2025	129
29	"Sibling Swap"	Venessa M. Diaz	Cassandra Parker	May 21, 2025	129
Lyla and Everett coach Luke, Stu, and Idris in soccer drills before their first practice. Liana and Louisa are tired of living with each other and decide to switch rooms with Lyla and Luke, but living with new roommates isn't easy.
30	"Dr. Luke Loops"	Sherri Stoner	Andrea Mercado	May 22, 2025	130
30	"Let's Roll!"	Ruth Morrison	Camilo Román	May 22, 2025	130
After Luke gets a check-up, he plays doctor with Stu as a nurse and Lyla pretends to be different patients. Lyla, Everett, Luke, and Stu build a track to get a tennis ball down to the lobby using materials from home.
31	"Cub Chuck Hustle"	Jehan Madhani	Kelly Erwin	November 10, 2025	131
31	"Lyla the Lefty"	Andrew Blanchette	Cassandra Parker	November 10, 2025	131
Lyla has to help a friend, a neighbor, and her community to earn a Helper Patch, but she rushes each task. After hurting her right wrist, Lyla struggles to adapt to using her left hand, but she finds clever solutions.
32	"Oaty Zappers On Ice"	Kris Marvin Hughes	Andrea Mercado	November 11, 2025	132
32	"The California Loops"	Monique D. Hall	Camilo Román	November 11, 2025	132
The Loops family go on a scavenger hunt around the supermarket to solve clues to get tickets to "Oaty Zappers On Ice!" Lyla tries to act older so she can spend time with her older cousin, Khamaal, when he visits.
33	"Blast Off" "3, 2, 1 Liftoff!"	Bex Tobin Fine and Izzy Woodbury	Kelly Erwin	November 12, 2025	133
33	"Sister Secrets"	Natalie Engel	Cassandra Parker	November 12, 2025	133
Lyla builds a spaceship with a new friend and learns people can be different from her. Lyla learns her sisters can predict what the other wants by observing one another, so she tries to do the same with Luke.
34	"Everett's Swim Lesson"	Darnell Lamont Walker	Andrea Mercado	November 13, 2025	134
34	"Miss Emmaline's New Beginning"	Fracaswell Hyman	Camilo Román	November 13, 2025	134
Everett faces his fear of water by taking a swimming lesson from Jia. Lyla doesn't want Miss Emmaline to move, so she recruits Everett and Luke to help replicate services offered in her new living community in the apartment building.
35	"When We Met Stu"	Dave Peth	Kelly Erwin and Camilo Román	November 14, 2025	140
The Loops pack holiday cookies and Stu helps deliver them. While he's away, the Loops tell stories of when they first met Stu. When Stu doesn't come back from his delivery, Lyla and her family need to figure out a way to get Stu back home.
36	"Lyla Can't Sleep"	Senibo Myers	Kelly Erwin	February 16, 2026	137
36	"Hairdos and Hair Don'ts"	Monique D. Hall	Cassandra Parker	February 16, 2026	137
Lyla can't fall asleep and tries to figure out what's wrong with her sleep routine. Lyla tries to do her own hairstyle with Stu's help, but it's a disaster and Lydia shows Lyla and Stu the steps to style her hair.
37	"Stu Needs a Bath"	Jehan Madhani	Kelly Erwin	February 17, 2026	135
37	"Callaloops"	Fracaswell Hyman	Cassandra Parker	February 17, 2026	135
Stu doesn't like baths, so Lyla and Luke find a way to clean and dry Stu. Through trial and error, Lyla and Ale find a solution to protect the callaloo plants from stink bugs.
38	"Find Mom's Phone!"	Fracaswell Hyman	Andrea Mercado	June 8, 2026	136
38	"Clean Sweep"	Kris Marvin Hughes	Camilo Román	June 8, 2026	136
Lyla has to backtrack her hike at Moon Rock Cove to find Lydia's missing phone. The Loops kids divide up the kitchen cleaning chores between easy and hard so everyone has an equal amount of work.
39	"Da Get Pep Band!"	Written by: Fracaswell Hyman; Story by: Genie Deez and Fracaswell Hyman	Andrea Mercado	June 9, 2026	138
39	"Lyla's Snackateria"	Joon Chung	Camilo Román	June 9, 2026	138
Lyla and Everett struggle to play Hot Cross Buns at the same tempo, and they learn how to read music. Lyla's upset after Luke doesn't follow her snack recipe, his snack becomes popular, and she realizes that new ideas are good too.
40	"Treasure Hunters"	Jehan Madhani	Kelly Erwin and Troy Sullivan	June 10, 2026	139
40	"Super Stu"	Ruth Morrison	Cassandra Parker	June 10, 2026	139
Lyla, Luke, and Everett look for buried car keys at the beach. Lyla and Everett take Stu to the park to find inspiration for their comic, "Super Stu," and realize that Stu can't solve problems on his own and needs their help.

== Soundtrack ==
The theme song in the show is performed by students at Fanny Jackson Coppin School in Philadelphia.

Original songs are performed by the characters in some episodes.

== Broadcast ==
Lyla in the Loop premiered on February 5, 2024, on PBS Kids.

Each episode features two 11-minute stories, plus interstitial content. The interstitial content in between the two 11-minute stories in each episode feature Lyla and her family doing either steps to play or do something or singing a song.
