= Pirates: Adventures in Art =

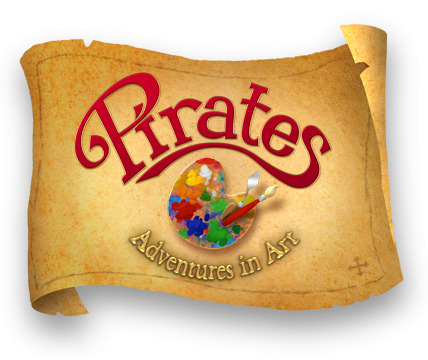
- Written by: Jed Mackay
- Directed by: William Gordon
- Voices of: Carlos Díaz; Tajja Isen; Joseph Motiki; Jayne Eastwood; James Rankin
- Opening theme: "Pirates: Adventures in Art" by Great Big Sea
- Ending theme: "Pirates: Adventures in Art" (Instrumental)
- Country of origin: Canada
- Original languages: English; French
- No. of seasons: 2
- No. of episodes: 44

Production
- Running time: 12 minutes
- Production companies: Halifax Film Company (Note: As Privateer Productions Incorporated for season 1 and Privateer Productions II Incorporated for season 2); Decode Entertainment (Distributor)

Original release
- Network: CBC Television
- Release: December 18, 2010 – October 15, 2011

Pirates: Adventures in Art (French: Pirates : Chercheurs d'art) is a Canadian CGI-animated children's television series which aired on CBC Television in Canada from December 18, 2010 to October 15, 2011. The show, produced by DHX Media, was creative-produced and executive-story edited by Jed MacKay, produced by Katrina Walsh and directed by William Gordon.

The show tells the story of four pirates: captain Leo, Fresco the gecko, Skelly the skeleton and Princess Cleo, who sail the seas in search of art, always dodging the evil, art-hating queen Conformia. Along the way, Princess Cleo of her former palace home, who has a knack for artwork, joins the trio and aids them in their quests. The show's theme song was performed by Canadian band Great Big Sea. 44 episodes were produced.

In Latin America, the show launched on February 27, 2012 on Discovery Kids and Boomerang in Spanish as Los piratas y sus aventuras coloridas and in Portuguese as Os piratas e suas aventuras coloridas (Brazil). It also aired in Israel on Israeli Educational Television with the title of הרפתקאות הפיראטים - מסעות בעולם האומנות and reduced as הרפתקאות הפיראטים, in Portugal on Canal Panda with the title of Os piratas e as suas aventuras coloridas, in Germany on Super RTL with the title of Cleo und die Kunstpiraten and in Spain on SerieStation with the title of Piratas: Los aventureros del Arte. In the United States, the show aired on Qubo from 2019 through the network's closure in 2021.

== Cast ==
- Joseph Motiki as Leo
- Tajja Isen as Cleo
- Carlos Díaz as Fresco de Gecko
- Jayne Eastwood as Queen Conformia
- James Rankin as Krank and Skelly

== Episodes ==
=== Season 1 (2010–11) ===
1. Cleo's Clue
2. Landscape Escape
3. Go Fly a Kite
4. The Tricky Tower
5. The Adventure of Wildfang Island
6. The Adventure of Dragon Boat
7. A Balancing Act
8. Collage
9. Cap'n Cubism
10. The Great Golden Gecko
11. Hide in Plain Sight
12. Yo Ho Shadow
13. Portrait of a Queen
14. A Yucky Uck Adventure
15. The Grape Escape
16. Mission Tradition

=== Season 2 (2011) ===
1. Say It with Symbols
2. Colour Me Purple
3. Marooned!
4. The Adventures of Wango Mango
5. All in Good Lime
6. All's Well that Ends Wall
7. Cleopatra's Crown
8. Veni Vidi Da Vinci!
9. Shutterbug
10. A Matter of Perspective
11. The Next Top Pirate
12. Queen Conformia's Mine
13. The Golden Gorgon
14. The Phantom of Crazy Castle
15. The Goblet
16. The Wrong Impression
17. The Ones that Got Away
18. Diorama Rama
19. Farm Folk Frenzy
20. The Artless Festival
21. Totally Totem
22. The Golden Tapestry
23. Weave Got You Covered
24. Fresco's Fresco
25. The Curse of the Zeus Temple
26. The Wild Brushman
27. Pop! Go the Pirates
28. A Lotta Terracotta
