= Transformers: BotBots =

Animated television series

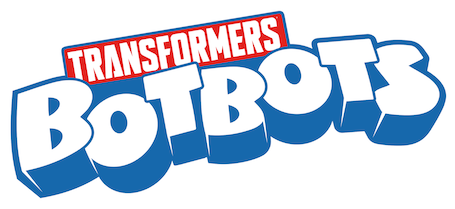
- Genre: Comedy; Science fiction; Action-adventure
- Created by: Steve Trenbirth
- Based on: Transformers by Hasbro
- Developed by: Kevin Burke; Chris "Doc" Wyatt
- Directed by: Paul O'Flanagan
- Voices of: Louisa Zhu; James Hartnett; Christian Potenza; Mark Little; Deven Mack; Lisa Norton; Joseph Motiki; Josette Jorge
- Music by: The Wilders Music Group Inc. (Note: A team of music composers consisting of Igor Correia and Jeff Milutinovic)
- Countries of origin: Canada; Ireland; United States
- Original language: English
- No. of seasons: 1
- No. of episodes: 10 (20 segments)

Production
- Executive producers: Olivier Dumont; Randi Yaffa; Kevin Burke; Chris "Doc" Wyatt
- Producers: Peter Lewis; Jon Wigfield; Tristan Homer (creative producer)
- Running time: 22 minutes
- Production companies: Hasbro; Entertainment One; Boulder Media

Original release
- Network: Netflix
- Release: March 25, 2022

Transformers: BotBots is an animated television series based on Hasbro's collectable toy line of the same name, which is a spin-off of the wider Transformers franchise by Hasbro, and produced by Entertainment One and Boulder Media. The first season debuted on Netflix on March 25, 2022. This was the last series to be produced between Entertainment One and Boulder Media, before Hasbro sold Boulder Media to the Australian media company Princess Pictures on November 1, 2022.

== Premise ==
A shopping mall is struck by a mysterious Energon cloud, turning the various objects (including non-electronics) into tiny transformable robots called BotBots. Among them, a group of items that were separated from their stores of origin awoke inside the lost-and-found, dubbing themselves the Lost Bots. Led by Burgertron, the leader of the Hunger Hubs, the Lost Bots dream to one day return to their original tribes, but after accidentally being spotted by the mall security guard (thus revealing the BotBots' existence to a human), they are treated as pariahs of the mall and set out to redeem themselves while discovering their own bonds and keeping away from many flesh beings.

As Burgertron leaves for his squad, the Lost Bots want to join him to find their squads. When Dave comes out of the bathroom, Burgertron teaches the Lost Bots "The Sacred Rule of the Mall": BotBots must never reveal their bot forms in front of the humans. Burgertron and the Lost Bots ride a mall train to avoid being seen by the Mall Guard. They soon ride the escalator and successfully arrived at the food court, which unfortunately alerted Dave. When Dave looks in the train, he sees Bonz-Eye, Dimlit, Kikmee and Clogstopper in disguise form. And when he sees Burgertron in disguise form, he attempts to eat him. However, Dimit changes back to bot form and jumps to save Burgertron, which unfortunately causes Dave to see Burgertron and Dimlit in their bot forms and see them disappear along with Bonz-Eye, Clogstopper and Kikmee, leading Dave to discover that BotBots exist. Spud Muffin, Ulf the Orange and the other BotBots later appear out of nowhere, furiated that Burgertron and the Lost Bots broke The Sacred Rule of the Mall, which caused Burgertron to be cast out of the Hunger Hubs, become a Lost Bot and be shunned by the other BotBots along with the Lost Bots. However, the Lost Bots weren't upset, they only cared about the other squads in the mall. Burgertron soon becomes the leader of the Lost Bots to attempt to reconcile the other BotBots.

== Characters ==
=== Lost Bots ===
- Burgertron (voiced by James Hartnett) – the leader of the Lost Bots and a former leader of the Hunger Hubs. Burgertron is egotistical and constantly thinks of himself as a superhero-type character, despite his shortcomings. He became a Lost Bot after he and Dimlit were caught by Dave, leaving him to be shunned by the others. A large portion of Season 1 revolves around him trying to get reaccepted, though after Spud Muffin's deceptions were revealed he stayed with the Lost Bots, which were made an official squad. He transforms into a hamburger.
- Dimlit (voiced by Deven Mack) – one of the first 4 Lost Bots who wants to join the Shed Heads. Dimlit is shy, nervous, and very reserved and easy-going, though he always pulls through when it counts. Much like Clogstopper, he is typically short on intellect, and with nothing to fear about his life prior to leaving the Lost & Found is generally very paranoid. He falls in love with another BotBot named Jacqueline in "Dimlit In Love", and transforms into a flashlight.
- Bonz-Eye (voiced by Louisa Zhu) – one of the first 4 Lost Bots who doesn't come from any squad in the mall. Bonz-Eye is very bold and calm, but far more level-headed than her compatriots. She is an expert swordsman and material artist. She was also revealed to be lesbian, Japanese and the only one of her kind so she does not have her very own squad. She is also the Lone Wolf as she alter ego name. Unlike the other females, she is the only one that doesn't have eyelashes. She sometimes likes to meditate. She transforms into a potted bonsai tree.
- Clogstopper (voiced by Christian Potenza) – one of the first 4 Lost Bots who wants to join the Custodial Crew. Clogstopper is idiotic, goofy, awkward, and prone to making very relaxed, funny and goofy decisions and unintentional comedies that usually cause odd problems for his groups. He hopes to go to the Custodial Crew as his own dream, Additionally, he is very funny compared to the others in his favorite comedy, he even uses a hand puppet sometimes. Clogstopper is also interest in Fottle Barts. He transforms into a plunger.
- Kikmee (voiced by Lisa Norton) – one of the first 4 Lost Bots who wants to join the Jock Squad. Kikmee is the most energetic and excitable of the group and is comparatively hyperactive, always gets very excited and gigglish, and loves sports as well as winning. She hopes to join the Jockey Squad. She transforms into a soccer ball. Kikmee was a member of the Playroom Posse in the actual toyline, following her original planned release for the range. Her gender was also changed, with her original toy bio using male pronouns. She loves seeing Batsby from the Jock Squad too.

=== Hunger Hubs ===
- Spud Muffin (voiced by Joseph Motiki) – a former friend of Burgertron's. Spud actively sought to get rid of him on a permanent basis, and sabotaged the Lost Bots several times at their last chances at redemption and trouble, before being exposed for his crimes and exiled to the Dark Side of the Mall at the Season 1 finale. He transforms into a box of French fries.
- Fottle Barts (voiced by Lisa Norton)- A member of the Hunger Hubs, she is the best friend of Ulf the Orange and always a nice and handy pal. Barts is also interested in Clogstopper. She transforms into a red-colored ketchup bottle.
- Angry Cheese (also voiced by James Hartnett)
- Hawt Diggity
- Ulf the Orange (voiced by Josette Jorge) – the love interest of both Burgertron (boyfriend) and Spud Muffin. She constantly shot down the former until Spud Muffin was exposed and exiled in the Season 1 finale, finally understanding his motives. She also gets angry or selfish sometimes at any risk or trouble in the mall. She is also a kind friend of Fottle Barts too. She transforms into an orange flavored juice box, and is based on a BotBot in the sixth wave of toys.
- Brock O'Lonely (voiced by Devon Hyland) – the DJ
- Tappy Takeout

=== Jock Squad ===
- Batsby (voiced by Sarah Hiller) – one of the two leaders of the Jock Squad, she is the handy friend of Dinger and transforms into a Baseball bat.
- Kidd Klobber – The boxer of the squad
- Laceface (voiced by Louisa Zhu) – A member of the Jock Squad, she is very brashed and cool to get many faces at once, she transforms into a football.
- Pucksie
- The In-Sole
- Dinger (voiced by Deven Mack) – a member of the Jock Squad. He is both brash and bold and always too much confident as well, and transforms into a baseball.

=== Shed Heads ===
- Cuddletooth
- Nail Byter
- Drilit Yaself
- Sandy Man

=== Sugar Shocks ===
- Frostferatu (voiced by Deven Mack) – a member of the Sugar Shocks. He believes he has hypnotism powers and is a vampire bot, plus he loves hanging out with the lost bots, he transforms into a cupcake.
- Sprinkleberry D'uhnut (voiced by Deven Mack) – a member of the Sugar Shocks. He normally stands around and is typically seen usually, he cannot say any words like the other bots, he only says "BotBots" but says "Lost Bots" at the season finale. He transforms into a donut with sprinkles.
- Lolly Licks (voiced by Lisa Norton) – is a member of the Sugar Shocks in the Ruckus Rally. She poses like the reference of Sailor Moon, she is the only bot to have a single eye, She is also a kind friend of Lady Macaron and Burgertron too, She even is selfish sometimes. and transforms into a lollipop.
- Sweet Cheat (voiced by Joseph Motiki)
- Wishy-Waffley (voiced by Cory Doran)
- Lady Macaron (voiced by Julie Lemieux) – a member of the Sugar Shocks. Macaron is known for being aristocratic and French, but is nice deep down if not a little rebellious at any time. She is a very close friend of Bonz-eye a.k.a. the "Lone Wolf", during her adventure from the Dark Side of the Mall and the lost bots. She transforms into a macaron, and unlike most of the other BotBots, is not based on any of the toys.
- Freezewich

=== Gamer Geeks ===
- Game Over (voiced by Josette Jorge) – a member of the Gamer Geeks. Game Over is one of the technology specialists amongst her squad, and she is one of the BotBots who covers up the tracks of their fellow beings at a very perfect operation to prevent their existence from being revealed. Game Over was characterized as a male member of the Lost Bots in the original toyline and transforms into a game controller.
- Fomo (voiced by Cory Doran) – a member of the Gamer Geeks. Fomo is one of the technology specialists in his squad, and he provides live footage through his lenses and a series of drones and soon becomes nice friends with the Lost Bots. Fomo was characterized as a female member of the Techie Team in the original toyline and transforms into a camera.
- Snorg (voiced by JJ Gerber) – a member of the Gamer Geeks who loves karaoke and refers to himself in the third person besides Pop N. Lock. He transforms into a cassette player in the original toyline and a karaoke machine in the netflix show.
- Pop N. Lock
- Steer'd Wrong (voiced by Josette Jorge)
- Chitter Click (voiced by Joseph Motiki)
- Ring-A-Ling (voiced by Ana Sani) – Dave's company phone which turned out to be a BotBot that controls everything on herself. She is one of the few that's not based on one of the toys.

=== Custodial Crew ===
- King Toots
- Sgt. Scrubforce (voiced by Joseph Motiki) – is the leader of the Custodial Crew and the army leader. He transforms into a bucket with a mop.
- Caution (voiced by Christian Potenza) – is a member of the custodial crew, he is even a nice person to all the bot bots, he transforms into a slip hazard sign.
- Handy
- Lady Loofa (voiced by Jacqueline Pillon) – a member of the Custodial Crew, she is confident and transforms into a sponge.
- Vomit Comet (voiced by Martin Roach) – a member of the Custodial Crew. He is one of the more level-headed BotBots, though he also likes causing mischief. He transforms into a vomit pile.
- Loose Deuce

=== Fashion Forwards ===
- Ol' Tic Toc (voiced by Martin Roach)
- Jacqueline (voiced by Julie Lemieux) – a shy BotBot from the Fashion Forwards and Dimlit's girlfriend. She transforms into a mannequin head, and unlike most of the other BotBots, is not based on any of the toys. She always gets calm and pleasant to see the Lost Bots as well.

=== Spoiled Rottens ===
- Disgusto Desserto (voiced by Kyle Dooley)

=== Arcade Renegades ===
- 24K-Bit (voiced by Kyle Dooley) – an arcaded token
- Knotzel (voiced by Sarah Hillier) – a pretzel

=== Science Alliance ===
- Dr. Flaskenstein (voiced by Julie Lemieux) – the leader
- Face Ace (voiced by Paloma Nuñez) – a member of the Science Alliance. She transforms into a pair of safety goggles.
- Starscope (voiced by Sean Jordan) – a member of the Science Alliance. He serves as the team's observer and a rapper and singer. Starscope was characterized as a female in the original toyline and transforms into a telescope.
- Eye-Goon (voiced by Chris Locke)

=== Pet Mob ===
- Anty Farmwell (voiced by Julie Lemieux) is a caretaker of her ants, she is seen with Dinger and Batsby, and she transforms into an ant farm

=== Top secret squad ===
- Agent Smartlit (voiced by Raven Dauda) – an agent in need of the lost bots and transforms into a flashlight because she is the same appearance like Dimlit.

=== Other notable BotBots ===
- Playgor Cardquest (voiced by Brandon Hackett) – a member of an unknown squad. He is known to the other BotBots for his troubador-styled singing, which often annoys those around him. He transforms into a stack of trading cards, despite his toy being released in wave 6 among the Gamer Geeks he has never been seen around them in the cartoon.

=== Humans ===
- Dave (voiced by Mark Little) – the mall security guard who is aware of the BotBots. He only saw three BotBots in robot form: Burgertron and Dimlit in the series premiere and Spud Muffin in the season 1 finale. He is known for being severely incompetent and easily fooled, though the BotBots refer to him as a dangerous threat. He also looks after the lost bots in their object form with nothing at risk that he carries a flashlight.
- Dave's mom – Dave's mother. She is the only person Dave frequently talks to, and she is constantly disappointed at her son.
- Randall – Dave's boss at the mall.
- Agent Wagner (voiced by Raven Dauda) – an agent from Sector Seven sent to deal with the mysterious occurrences at the mall and meets Dave for a talk in the Goldrush Games.

== Episodes ==
No.	Title	Written by	Storyboard by	Original release date
1a	"Mall Than Meets The Eye"	Kevin Burke & Chris "Doc" Wyatt	Estrela Lourenco	March 25, 2022
Dave interrupts a BotBots party at the mall, leading Burgertron to fall turn into the Lost and Found where he meets four new BotBots called "The Lost Bots." Burgertron introduces them to various BotBots squads in the mall, and the Lost Bots express a desire to find their own squads. Burgertron teaches them the "Sacred Rule of the Mall" – never reveal their bot forms to humans. Despite their efforts to avoid detection, Dave discovers the BotBots and attempts to expose them. Burgertron is cast out of his squad for breaking the rule, becoming a Lost Bot, and the other BotBots are furious. The Lost Bots, however, are focused on reconciling with other squads. As Dave plans to expose the BotBots, Burgertron becomes the leader of the Lost Bots in an attempt to bring unity among the BotBots.
1b	"(Never) Be Yourself"	Kevin Burke & Chris "Doc" Wyatt	Francesco Cipolla	March 25, 2022
The Lost Bots make viral videos they hope will get them lots of likes.
2a	"Escape from Snackatraz"	Alan Denton & Greg Hahn	Estrela Lourenco	March 25, 2022
A vampire-cupcake bot called Frostferatu needs help escaping from a snack machine before Dave shows up.
2b	"I, Cheeseburger"	Kevin Burke & Chris "Doc" Wyatt	Francesco Cipolla	March 25, 2022
Burgertron hopes to bring his musical, "I, Cheeseburger" to the big stage... In the food court.
3a	"Phoning It In"	Taneka Stotts	Estrela Lourenco	March 25, 2022
The Lost Bots have to delete photos off Dave's phone that could blow their cover.
3b	"The Lost Bots and the Claw Crusade"	Alan Denton & Greg Hahn	Francesco Cipolla	March 25, 2022
Kikmee tries to win a toy snake from a claw machine while Burgertron and Dimlit seek a souvenir cup.
4a	"Live and Let LARP"	Kevin Burke & Chris "Doc" Wyatt	Estrela Lourenco & Francesco Cipolla	March 25, 2022
Burgertron thinks he's too cool to join the Lost Bot's live-action role-playing game.
4b	"Lone Bot and Carb"	Hanah Lee Cook	Jamie Kerr & Adeola Lawal	March 25, 2022
Bonz-Eye isn't sure which squad she belongs to.
5a	"Dimlit In Love"	Hanah Lee Cook	Estrela Lourenco & Francesco Cipolla	March 25, 2022
5b	"On the Bot Prom Dance Floor"	Kevin Burke & Chris "Doc" Wyatt	Jean Texier	March 25, 2022
6a	"The Ruckus Rally"	Kevin Burke & Chris "Doc" Wyatt	Estrela Lourenco & Francesco Cipolla	March 25, 2022
6b	"Crime and Bun-ishment"	Alan Denton & Greg Hahn	Jean Texier, Jamie Kerr & Adeola Lawal	March 25, 2022
7a	"Spirit of Halloween"	Hanah Lee Cook	Estrela Lourenco & Francesco Cipolla	March 25, 2022
7b	"Rage Against the Karaoke Machine"	Merrill Hagan	Jean Texier, Jamie Kerr & Adeola Lawal	March 25, 2022
8a	"Scanned Out"	Rose Bueno	Estrela Lourenco & Francesco Cipolla	March 25, 2022
8b	"The Science Alliance"	Alan Denton & Greg Hahn	Jean Texier	March 25, 2022
9a	"Agent Smartlit"	Jacquie Menville	Estrela Lourenco & Francesco Cipolla	March 25, 2022
9b	"Shopping Brawl"	Kevin Burke & Chris "Doc" Wyatt	Jean Texier, Jamie Kerr & Adeola Lawal	March 25, 2022
10	"The Goldrush Games"	Katie Kaniewski ("Part the First"); Kevin Burke & Chris "Doc" Wyatt ("Part the Second")	Estrela Lourenco & Francesco Cipolla ("Part the First"); Jean Texier, Jamie Kerr & Adeola Lawal ("Part the Second")	March 25, 2022
A mysterious bot called the Game's Master arrives and announces the Goldrush to show who's the best in the mall. Burgertron, seeing an opportunity to get accepted back in his squad, allows himself and the Lost Bots to join but in exchange for an exile to the dark side of the mall if they do not get first place. The Lost Bots were proven professional in the games, allowing them to get in the top rankings. Spud allows Burgertron back in the Hunger Hubs in hopes the Lost Bots would lose, which was succeeded. Burgertron, however, got suspicious of Spud and exposed the Games Master as Brock, whom Spud forced to rig the games and made him look like he was on vacation until Spud gave different locations spots. Burgertron reveals that the everything Goldrush Games was nothing more than a sham that Spud planned to get himself and the Lost Bots exiled, much to the others shocked and horror. Spud, exposed, goes insane and admits his actions in front of everyone, revealing that he was the one that got Burgertron in the Lost and Found and been trying to get rid of him from the start because of his envy of not being the leader of the Hunger Hubs he believe he should be, making him also responsible for the other events that got him and the Lost Bots involved and trying to prevent them from redeeming themselves. All of sudden Dave came by and finds Spud, who left himself exposed while he was ranting crazily without even noticing his surroundings just as the other bots, including Burgertron, were able to disguise and hide in the nick of time. Dave tells Spud to thank Burgertron for getting his job and says he's done trying to prove the bots' existence since no one he told believed him anyway. Breaking the sacred rule of the mall, the bots, furious and disgusted at Spud's actions and behavior, attempted to have him banned from the mall forever but Burgertron and the Lost Bots prevented that because he believes that Spud should be given a chance for redemption just like he was given the chance to redeem himself. In order for that to happen, Spud will be living in the dark side of the mall until he's proven worthy of rejoining the bots again. With the truth finally reveal and Spud no long sabotaging any of their chances at redemption, the bots reconcile with Burgertron and finally accepts the Lost Bots as officially part of their society as an official squad. Meanwhile, Dave meets an agent from Sector 7 to learn about the bots and the energon cloud.
