= Deborah Odell =

Canadian actress and singer (born 1973)

Deborah O'Dell
- Occupations: Actress, singer
- Years active: 1997–2012 (retired from acting)

Deborah Lee O'Dell is a Canadian actress and singer. She has appeared in various films and TV series.

== Career ==
Deborah made her acting debut in the 1997 fantasy film A Simple Wish, which featured Mara Wilson and Martin Short.

Deborah has made various television appearances including F/X: The Series, Earth: Final Conflict, and Mythic Warriors.

She voiced Ariel Flyer in the animated series, Rescue Heroes, taking over for Lisa Messinger, who previously voiced Ariel Flyer for the first season.

== Filmography ==
=== Film ===
Year	Title	Role	Notes
1997	A Simple Wish	Jeri	
2001	Protection	Laura	
2002	Deceived	Kara Walsh	Direct-to-video
2002	Interstate 60	Valerie McCabe	
2002	Fancy Dancing	Charity	
2002	You Stupid Man	Audrey	
2003	Alien Tracker		Direct-to-video
2003	Rescue Heroes: The Movie	Ariel Flyer (voice)	Direct-to-video
2004	Godsend	Tanya	
2006	The Last Sect	Anna	
2007	Final Draft	Sam	
2007	Your Beautiful Cul de Sac Home	Housecoat Lady	
2008	Time Bomb	Jane	
2009	Horsemen	Ms. Bradshaw	

=== Television ===
Year	Title	Role	Notes
1997	F/X: The Series	Yvonne Cherico	Episode: "Reunion"
1998	F/X: The Series	Deanna Elliott	Episode: "Stand-Off"
1998	Mr. Music	Cathy the English Reporter	Television film
1998	Eerie, Indiana: The Other Dimension	Mrs. Taylor	15 episodes
1998	Brats of the Lost Nebula	Lavana (voice)	TV series
1999	Rescue Heroes	Ariel Flyer (voice)	TV series
1999	Coming Unglued	Female Council Member	Television film
1999	Total Recall 2070	Bayliss	3 episodes
1999	La Femme Nikita	Ellen	Episode: "I Remember Paris"
1999	Thrill Seekers	Jen	Television film
1999	Earth: Final Conflict	Dr. Catharine Cox	Episode: "Bliss"
1999	Mythic Warriors	Deianira (voice)	Episode: "Hercules and the Golden Apples"
2000	Mythic Warriors	Deianira (voice)	Episode: "Hercules and the Titans: The Last Battle"
2000	Higher Ground	Hannah Barnes	5 episodes
2000	Psi Factor	Serena Wilson	Episode: "Force Majeure"
2001	Dangerous Child	Marcia	Television film
2001	Relic Hunter	Agent Kouri	Episode: "Mr. Right"
2001	Earth: Final Conflict	Melissa Donovan	Episode: "Subterra"
2001	Leap Years	Amanda Dooling	4 episodes
2001	Martin the Warrior: A Tale of Redwall	Pallum (voice)	TV series
2001	Mutant X	Lisa Valentine	Episode: "Crime of the New Century"
2002	Doc	Valerie Thornton	Episode: "Queen of Denial"
2002	Guilt by Association	Helen	Television film
2002	Tracker	Dr. Collen Hampton	Episode: "Back Into the Breach"
2002	Just a Walk in the Park	Mrs. Preston	Television film
2002	Ace Lightning	Sparx	TV series
2002	Adventure Inc.	Claire Morgan / Mayor Teri Landau	Episode: "The Fate of the Liverpool Flyer"
2003	Jasper, Texas	Woman Reporter	Television film
2003	Street Time	Debbie Waxman	Episode: "Sex, Lies and a Truckload of Dates"
2003	Mutant X	Kristen Greg	Episode: "Wages of Sin"
2003	An American in Canada	Misty Hayes	Episode: "Play Misty for Me"
2004	Starhunter	Kate	Episode: "Kate"
2004	She's Too Young	Ginnie Gensler	Television film
2004	While I Was Gone	Sylvia Mayhew	Television film
2004	Kevin Hill	Randi Rice	Episode: "Gods and Monsters"
2005	Tilt	Mindy	Episode: "Shuffle Up and Deal"
2005	Queer as Folk	Claire Daniels	Episode: "5.6"
2005	Wild Card	Elyse	Episode: "Zoe's Phony Matrimony"
2005	Missing	Marsha Flowers	Episode: "Last Night"
2005	Mayday	Rachel Seymour	Television film
2006	At the Hotel	Publisher	Episode: "I F***** Lou Reed"; Episode: "Modern Solutions to Modern Problems"
2006	Puppets Who Kill	Prof. Lucia DeLamamamour	Episode: "Bill's Wedding"
2006	Drive Time Murders	Yvonne Rankin	Television film
2006	Gospel of Deceit	Lori Fusaro	Television film
2007	The Dead Zone	Dr. Nina Jorgenson	Episode: "Ego"
2007	The Best Years	Prof. Elizabeth Grant	5 episodes
2007	All the Good Ones Are Married	Lauren	Television film
2007	The Dresden Files	Whitney Timmons	Episode: "Birds of a Feather"
2008	The Dresden Files	Whitney Timmons	Episode: "Pilot: Storm Front"
2008	Left Coast	Betty	Television film
2008	MVP	Evelyn McBride	10 episodes
2010	Nikita	Rosalee Zoman	Episode: "All the Way"
2011	Alphas	Bonita	Episode: "Cause and Effect"
2011	Certain Prey	Redhead Lawyer	Television film
2012	Lost Girl	Awero	Episode: "Into the Dark"
2012	Murdoch Mysteries	Hannah Beaumont	Episode: "Staircase to Heaven"
