= Rescue Heroes =

Franchise

Rescue Heroes are a line of action figures targeted towards preschool-age children, released by Fisher-Price. The line was first introduced in 1997, depicting various rescue personnel, such as firefighters, police officers, and construction workers, which included interchangeable tool packs that attached to the back of figures and featured various electronic or mechanical gimmicks. In 1999 an animated television series of the same name debuted. A film titled Rescue Heroes: The Movie was released in 2003.

== Television series ==
On October 2, 1999, an animated television series based on the toy line debuted. The TV series, titled Rescue Heroes, ran for three seasons, concluding on December 18, 2002.

The TV series, which is about a group of rescue personnel that travel the world while saving lives from both natural and man-made disasters, strives to teach proper safety techniques and how to deal with various issues. At the end of most episodes the Rescue Heroes would give safety tips and discuss how to handle the conflict presented in the episode. The episode would then usually conclude with the motto "Think like a Rescue Hero, think safe."

Episodes of the television show were often included on VHS as a free bonus with the purchase of the toys.

== Hiatus and return ==
In 2007, Fisher-Price stopped producing Rescue Heroes products and updating the Rescue Heroes website. However, from 2010 to 2013, Fisher-Price produced a new collection of figurines under the title "Hero World", a line shared with other licensed characters. Among the collection were preexisting characters such as Billy Blazes and Jake Justice.

In 2019, Fisher-Price relaunched the Rescue Heroes brand, now exclusive to Walmart stores in the United States. This included figurines and various vehicles, such as a fire tracker and hover pack. Fisher-Price also released a reboot of the original TV series to YouTube.

== Interactive games ==
Rescue Heroes has spawned numerous interactive formats of entertainment, including PC, Sony PlayStation, Game Boy Color, Game Boy Advance, Pixter, Radica Play TV, and Smart Cycle.

=== PC ===
- Rescue Heroes: Hurricane Havoc (1999)
- Rescue Heroes: Meteor Madness (2001)
- Rescue Heroes: Tremor Trouble (2002)
- Rescue Heroes: Lava Landslide (2003)
- Rescue Heroes: Mission Select (2003)

=== Sony PlayStation ===
- Rescue Heroes: Molten Menace (2000)

=== Game Boy Color ===
- Rescue Heroes: Fire Frenzy (2000)

=== Game Boy Advance ===
- Rescue Heroes: Billy Blazes (2003)

=== Pixter ===
- Rescue Heroes Mission Masters (black and white) (2002)
- Rescue Heroes Mission Masters (color) (2003)

=== Radica Play TV ===
- Rescue Heroes

=== Smart Cycle ===
- Rescue Heroes
