= Rescue Heroes (TV series) =

Television series

- Also known as: Rescue Heroes: Global Response Team; Rescue Heroes: GRT
- Created by: Fisher-Price
- Starring: Norm Spencer; Lenore Zann; Martin Roach; Joseph Motiki; Lisa Messinger; Deborah Odell; Rod Wilson
- Countries of origin: Canada; Taiwan (season 1)
- Original language: English
- No. of seasons: 3
- No. of episodes: 39 (59 segments)

Production
- Executive producers: Michael Hirsh; Patrick Loubert; Clive A. Smith; James Wang
- Running time: 22 minutes
- Production companies: Nelvana Limited; Hong Guang Animation (Su Zhou) Co., Ltd. (season 1); CBS Productions (season 1)

Original release
- Network: CBS (United States, season 1); Teletoon (Canada)
- Release: October 2, 1999 – December 18, 2002

Rescue Heroes (later known as Rescue Heroes: Global Response Team) is an animated adventure television series produced by Nelvana. Based on the Fisher-Price toy line of the same name, the television series tracks the adventures of a team of emergency responders who rescue people from various disasters.

The series premiered in Canada on Teletoon on October 2, 1999, and ran for three seasons until December 18, 2002. On November 18, 2003, a film titled Rescue Heroes: The Movie was released, making it the final episode for the series.

== Overview ==
Rescue Heroes focuses on a group of rescue personnel who aim to save lives around the world from both natural and man-made disasters.

The headquarters, also known as the Mountain Action Command Center, is where team leader Billy Blazes, along with team members Wendy Waters, Jake Justice, Jack Hammer, Ariel Flyer, and Rocky Canyon, reside. Calls for help come into the command center through Warren Waters, the director and chief dispatcher of the Rescue Heroes as well as Wendy's father.

The television series aims to show how to handle emergency situations, as well as how to deal with personal issues, such as disagreements. At the end of most episodes the Rescue Heroes would give safety tips and discuss how to handle the conflict presented in the episode. The episode would then usually conclude with the motto "Think like a Rescue Hero, think safe."

== Characters ==
=== Main ===
- Billy Blazes (voiced by Norm Spencer), a Canadian firefighter hailing from Quebec, is the leader of the Rescue Heroes who helped choose the other members of the team. He has a younger brother named Bobby, as well as a father. Billy had an uneasy relationship with his father. This was because Bobby chose to become a firefighter like Billy, instead of being a construction worker like their father. It was revealed in the episode "Flashback to Danger" that Billy was chosen to be a Rescue Hero after saving a group of children trapped in a carnival ride that was set ablaze.
- Wendy Waters (voiced by Lenore Zann), a firefighter, is effectively the second-in-command. Her father, Warren, is a Rescue Hero who works on-board the command space station. It was through a news report about a factory being set ablaze that lead to her being chosen to try out for the Rescue Heroes.
- Jake Justice (voiced by Martin Roach), a police officer, was chosen to try out for the Rescue Heroes when he caught a wanted criminal after a televised car chase that made national headlines. It is revealed in the revival that he has a daughter named Sky Justice.
- Richmond "Rocky" Canyon (voiced by Joseph Motiki), a mountain climbing specialist, is the youngest member of the Rescue Heroes. When Billy had once considered quitting the Rescue Heroes it was ultimately Rocky, through an audition video, who convinced him to stay, cementing Billy's decision to hire Rocky. The episode "Twister" revealed that his hometown is in Oklahoma, and that his father is deceased.
- Ariel Flyer (voiced by Lisa Messinger in season one and Deborah Odell in seasons two and three), a bilingual flight and wildlife specialist, was once a stunt pilot who had a rival named Avery Ator. However, Avery's lack of concern for safety has led to Ariel rescuing him on two occasions.
- Jack Hammer (voiced by Rod Wilson), a construction worker hailing from Texas, was originally a contractor hired to build the Rescue Heroes' base of operations, but had saved a fellow construction worker in a crane accident. Because of this, he was given the opportunity to try out for the Rescue Heroes. Jack has a strong-willed younger sister named Jill, who is a member of the Texas Fire Brigade, and with whom Jack has a complicated relationship that's both loving and fractious.

=== Secondary ===
- Aiden Assist (voiced by Scott McCord), a paraplegic paramedic.
- Al Pine (voiced by Edward Glen), an arctic rescue specialist, with his St. Bernard, Windchill.
- Ben Choppin (voiced by Robert Bockstael), a lumberjack.
- Bill Barker (voiced by Kent Sheridan), a ground patrol specialist and K-9 unit. Buster's caretaker.
- Bob Buoy (voiced by Dorian Harewood), a scuba diver and submarine operator.
- Bob Sled (voiced by Andrew Sabiston), an arctic rescue specialist and snowmobile operator.
- Brandon Irons (voiced by Richard McMillan), a cowboy.
- Buster, a German Shepherd K9-Unit dog who works alongside Bill Barker.
- Captain Cuffs (voiced by Colin O'Meara), a police officer.
- Cliff Hanger (voiced by Adrian Hough), a birdwing operator and hang glider.
- Gil Gripper (voiced by Paul Essiembre), a scuba diver and a jet ski operator.
- Hal E. Copter (voiced by Tony Daniels), a heli-pack operator.
- Kenny Ride (voiced by Richard Yearwood), a bicycle police officer.
- Matt Medic (voiced by Andrew Pifko), a physician.
- Maureen Biologist (voiced by Jane Luk), an ocean rescue specialist and safety diver.
- Nemo, a dolphin who helps Gil with water rescues
- Pat Pending (voiced by Donald Burda), a chief equipment designer of the Rescue Heroes.
- Perry Chute (voiced by David Sparrow), a parachuter.
- Radar, a bat who helps Rock Miner with underground rescues
- Rip Rockefeller (voiced by Cathal J. Dodd), a construction worker and mountaineer.
- Rock Miner (voiced by Peter Cugno), a safety spelunker and Radar's caretaker.
- Roger Houston (voiced by Christopher Earle), an astronaut and communications officer.
- Sam Sparks (voiced by Vince Corazza), a firefighter.
- Sandy Beach (voiced by Jesse Collins), a lifeguard and a surfing specialist.
- Sergeant Siren (voiced by Dean McDermott), is a police sergeant.
- Seymour Wilde (voiced by Cedric Smith), an animal wrangler.
- Warren Waters (voiced by John Bourgeois), a director and a chief dispatcher; also the father of Wendy Waters.
- Willy Stop (voiced by Paul Haddad), a traffic officer and crowd control specialist.

== Episodes ==
=== Series overview ===
Season	Episodes	Originally released	
Season	Episodes	First released	Last released
Pilot		April 7, 1998	
1	13	October 2, 1999	January 29, 2000
2	13	July 21, 2001	November 28, 2001
3	13	September 11, 2002	December 18, 2002

=== Pilot (1998) ===
Title	Original release date
Lava Alarm	April 7, 1998
A volcano is about to erupt off the coast at Paradise Point. Professor Noah Lott, a naturalist, and his wife are camped close to the volcano while their kids are also exploring, far from safety. It is up to the Rescue Heroes to save the family before it is too late. Note: This episode never aired on television and was only released on VHS and DVD.

=== Season 1 (1999–2000) ===
No. overall	No. in season	Title	Original release date
1	1	"Peril on the Peaks"	October 2, 1999
During a fire rescue, Rocky Canyon is overly zealous and takes matters into his own hands, ignoring the team plan, and inadvertently putting the others at risk. The Rescue Heroes express the importance and safety of sticking to the plan, and of being a team player. Later, the Rescue Heroes are called in to rescue mountain climbers faced with a fierce, unexpected storm, and subsequent avalanche. Rocky relies on the team plan, and the Rescue Heroes successfully come to the aid of the mountain climbers.
2	2	"El Niño"	October 9, 1999
On a remote South American island, unexpected torrential rains cause a volcano filled with water to burst, sending a mudslide heading toward the town below. As the Rescue Heroes come to the town's aid, Jake Justice is faced with an elderly man who insists on relying on an ancient legend to save them.
3	3	"Tidal Wave"	October 16, 1999
An earthquake off the coast of South America creates an enormous tidal wave threatening oceanographers in the area, an oil derrick home to several workers, and the entire population of Chile. Wendy Waters, with the assistance of Gil Gripper, must strategically place a detonation device beneath the ocean's surface to help stop the tidal wave before it wipes out the entire area. Unfortunately, she is ill at ease with underwater rescues because of a scuba diving incident in her past. For the sake of the rescue, Wendy faces her fear by trusting the training of Gil, so that she can deal with the situation at hand.
4	4	"Twister"	October 23, 1999
During a tornado which sweeps across his hometown, Rocky Canyon is desperate to protect a hot rod, which has sentimental value, from the devastation of the twister. Unfortunately, his childhood nemesis, who continues to antagonize him at every opportunity, is in need of rescuing as well.
5	5	"Electrical Storm"	November 6, 1999
An electrical storm throws a town into mayhem as the lightning knocks out power and phone lines, causing fires to erupt, as well as explosions on volatile power plants. During their rescues, the Rescue Heroes are faced with multiple issues that must be overcome, and they are reminded that they must persevere.
6	6	"Meteor"	November 13, 1999
After Wendy has a close call and gets injured during a train rescue in Finland, she obliges the wishes of her father, Warren Waters, to recuperate in the Space Command Center (aka "The Hexagon") so that they can spend some time together. During her time there, a meteor shower strikes The Hexagon on its way to Earth, and, as the other Rescue Heroes tend to the devastation on Earth, Wendy works alongside her father to tend to the damage aboard The Hexagon. Warren suggests that Wendy transfer to The Hexagon, where she can enter the Space Training Program and be closer to him. Wendy would rather be stationed on Earth, battling fires and other disasters to help rescue those in need, so she is faced with the difficult task of telling her father that she wants something different for herself than what he wants for her.
7	7	"Arctic Spill"	November 20, 1999
The hull of an oil tanker takes a beating from the barrage of massive icebergs in the Arctic until it is ripped apart, causing a major oil spill. The Rescue Heroes utilize the expertise of Jack Hammer to do an underwater construction and repair. The task proves more difficult and time-consuming than Jack had anticipated, and he learns that it is more harmful than helpful to push himself too hard to get a job done when it can still be accomplished with the help of others.
8	8	"When it Rains, it Pours"	December 4, 1999
When the media hear about Ariel's heroic rescue of a trapped hiker during a forest fire, she is approached by a National Safety Council to become a Spokesperson for Safety. Ariel agrees, since she would love to educate others on safety. Unfortunately, the seminars would take her away from being a Rescue Hero. During a flash flood, it becomes apparent to Ariel that her skills are desperately needed, and that being a Rescue Hero is where she can provide the most help.
9	9	"Cave In"	December 11, 1999
Rocky's former professor becomes trapped in a tunnel.
10	10	"The Fire of Field 13"	December 18, 1999
The Rescue Heroes are called in to assist local firefighters with a massive forest fire that is heading directly for several natural gas wells. Billy Blazes comes to the aide of his brother, Bobby, who has a difficult time controlling his anger when it comes to handling the fire, therefore putting himself and others in danger.
11	11	"Four Alarm Fire and Brimstone"	January 15, 2000
A neighborhood kid accidentally sets fire to Jake's former "little brother" Nick's house. Jake and the Rescue Heroes are called to assist local authorities. The house is damaged and will take time to repair, so Jake offers the Mountain Action Command Center as a temporary home to the family. When Nick accidentally stows away on the Hyperjet, he inadvertently causes serious complications during a rescue mission on an active volcano.
12–13	12–13	"Storm of the Century"	January 22, 2000 (Part 1) January 29, 2000 (Part 2)
Part 1: A huge cold air mass occurs, causing storms throughout North America. Billy encounters his father when he is called on a rescue mission in his hometown, Quebec. Later, Billy and his father are stuck in the Hyperjet and must put their differences behind them so they can find a way to get out of the situation. Part 2: Billy's father comes to accept the choice Billy has made in his life to help others. They work together and try to get the Hyperjet repaired and take off.

=== Global Response Team ===
==== Season 2 (2001) ====
- Starting with this season, the show is now known as Rescue Heroes: Global Response Team.

No. overall	No. in season	Title	Original release date
14a	1a	"Wildfire"	July 21, 2001
A wildfire in an African Wildlife Reserve threatens to destroy the entire area.
14b	1b	"White Wall of Terror"	July 21, 2001
Rocky's day on the slopes of Colorado turns into a rescue mission when two teens are buried underneath an avalanche. He, along with Al Pine, will have to face an unstable mountain in order to save the two teenagers.
15a	2a	"Rock Star on the Rocks"	July 28, 2001
The Rescue Heroes battle a fierce storm and wild animals to rescue a rock star and her dad, whose plane has crashed in a remote mountain area.
15b	2b	"Last Stop – Disaster"	July 28, 2001
The Rescue Heroes must save passengers on a runaway Japanese Bullet Train.
16a	3a	"Houston, We Have a Problem"	August 4, 2001
Roger Houston feels more like a benchwarmer instead of a Rescue Hero as he watches yet another rescue from space. This will change when an out-of-control satellite threatens to hit earth and inflict disaster.
16b	3b	"Trapped Beneath the Sea"	August 4, 2001
While Rocky is trying to solve a puzzle as part of his training, a submarine and a cruise ship collide at sea. The Rescue Heroes are called in to get the sailors out from the submarine trapped on the ocean's floor and put out the fire on the sinking cruise ship.
17a	4a	"Underwater Nightmare"	August 11, 2001
A boy will have to face his fear of swimming when a marine zoo starts to collapse after an underwater volcano becomes active. The Rescue Heroes will have to save both human and aquatic life before the disaster hits.
17b	4b	"Eye of the Storm"	August 11, 2001
A boy who idolizes the Rescue Heroes learns that heroes come in all shapes and sizes. His father, the town sheriff, will assist Billy when his son needs to be rescued during a hurricane. His father learns a lesson as well: that the Rescue Heroes are not what he originally perceived.
18a	5a	"High Anxiety"	August 18, 2001
Wendy's competitive nature gets the best of her and she jeopardizes a rescue when she tries to prove to Billy that she can do anything he can. Note: "High Anxiety" was originally aired as "Terror in the Tower". However, after the 9/11 attacks, it was changed to "High Anxiety".
18b	5b	"Canyon Catastrophe"	August 18, 2001
Three teen mountain bikers get more than they bargained for when they decide to ride trails that are off limits in the Grand Canyon. A boy, who was deemed chicken by the teens, will assist the Rescue Heroes in rescuing the teens.
19a	6a	"Mayhem in the Mist"	August 25, 2001
Chaos occurs when fog causes a pileup in England. An injury makes Billy realize that being a good leader also means knowing when to hand over the reins.
19b	6b	"Sibling Blowout"	August 25, 2001
Jack is having problems dealing with his sister, Jill, after he learns that she became a firefighter. It isn't until they work as a team to cap one that he understands her passion.
20	7	"Smokejumpers"	September 1, 2001
A raging forest fire threatens to consume a national forest and a nearby town.
21a	8a	"Edge of Disaster"	September 26, 2001
Rocky gets a chance to prove he is more than just a rookie when he leads a rescue expedition on the world's most dangerous peak.
21b	8b	"Flood of Fear"	September 26, 2001
Jake and Jack become at odds when Jack's joking becomes too much for Jake. However, after Jake sees how Jack uses humor to defuse a situation during a flood in a small town, he begins to appreciate Jack's humor.
22a	9a	"Summertime Twister"	October 24, 2001
A twister hits a campground, putting people in danger, including one girl's younger sister.
22b	9b	"The Chilling Championship"	October 24, 2001
The Rescue Heroes must save a team of high school basketball players when their bus plunges into an icy river.
23	10	"Flashback to Danger"	November 7, 2001
When Rocky's mistake during a rescue almost costs a life, he decides to quit the Rescue Heroes. In an effort to make him stay, Billy tells Rocky the story about the only other Rescue Hero that decided to quit.
24a	11a	"Tidal Wave of Pride"	November 14, 2001
A tidal wave threatens the lives of a seaside community during an "extreme sports" weekend.
24b	11b	"A Whale of an Adventure"	November 14, 2001
Bill Barker does not want to do circus training; he would rather stick to strength training. However, he learns that circus training is just as important as strength training during a water rescue.
25a	12a	"Shake Up in the Jungle"	November 21, 2001
A group of students, along with their professor, get trapped in the Venezuelan jungle after an earthquake.
25b	12b	"Lights, Camera, – Destruction!"	November 21, 2001
A Hollywood star tries to emulate the Rescue Heroes in order to prepare for a role in his upcoming film. When the Rescue Heroes are called to help local authorities handle a mudslide, the actor interferes with the mission.
26a	13a	"Rescue Robots"	November 28, 2001
When Pat Pending unveils the new Rescue Robot, Billy does not approve. Later, Billy becomes trapped in a cave and only the Rescue Robot can save him.
26b	13b	"Race to the Finish"	November 28, 2001
Al Pine and Bill Barker compete in a dog sled race. When a man in the race tries to cheat in order to win, he discovers that cheating does not always end with desirable results.

==== Season 3 (2002) ====
No. overall	No. in season	Title	Original release date
27	1	"Heroes"	September 11, 2002
The Rescue Heroes attend a conference where they honor various rescue teams that they have encountered. Meanwhile, Billy is nervous about his turn and anything that can go wrong does go wrong.
28a	2a	"Ultimate Ride"	September 18, 2002
When Pat introduces the new ultimate robot vehicle, Jake has difficulty trying to operate it. Because of this, he decides to give up trying and stick to using his motorcycle. However, when Jack is injured during a rescue and is unable to operate the ultimate robot vehicle, he has no choice but to use it in order to complete the mission.
28b	2b	"The Newest Rescue Hero"	September 18, 2002
Jack thinks he's doing his sister, Jill, a favor when he gets her a spot on the Rescue Heroes.
29a	3a	"Blackout"	September 25, 2002
When a city is plunged into darkness, Billy calls out the Night Force. Billy, Jake, and Sam Sparks descend into a subway system to rescue trapped passengers; meanwhile Aidan Assist, Sergeant Siren, and Willy Stop help land a crippled plane on a city street.
29b	3b	"Fire Down Under"	September 25, 2002
A series of wildfires rage out of control in New South Wales, Australia, forcing people to evacuate their homes while threatening to destroy wildlife and their habitats.
30a	4a	"Up, Up and Uh-Oh"	October 2, 2002
When Avery Ator neglects to perform routine maintenance on his biplane, the flaps get stuck during an airshow. Ariel, along with the other Rescue Heroes, must rescue him before his plane crashes.
30b	4b	"Fiery Differences"	October 2, 2002
Two neighbors embroiled in an argument don't realize that their entire town could go up in flames if a forest fire hits a nearby gas station.
31a	5a	"On Thin Ice"	October 23, 2002
After a massive snowfall, the Rescue Heroes must evacuate residents of a Seniors' Center before the building collapses. Later, Al discovers that his niece and nephew have gone missing. Al, along with the other Rescue Heroes, will have to rescue them, as well as their horse, from a frozen lake.
31b	5b	"Peril in Peru"	October 23, 2002
Ariel and Rock Miner must rescue a trapped archeologist in a booby-trapped tomb.
32	6	"In the Driver's Seat"	October 30, 2002
A car crash and an explosion cause fiery oil to run into a sewer, causing the faucets and hoses to shoot fire.
33a	7a	"For Better or Curse"	November 6, 2002
When the Rescue Heroes have to go underwater to save an eccentric treasure hunter trapped in a sunken pirate's ship, Rocky is convinced that it is an ancient curse that is making the rescue difficult.
33b	7b	"Bat's Life"	November 6, 2002
When an oil drill accidentally pierces a salt vein in a seabed, seawater dissolves through and floods nearby stalactite caves while trapping a mother and daughter inside.
34a	8a	"The Royal Rescue Hero"	November 13, 2002
After saving a princess, Rocky is asked to be a safety officer for the kingdom.
34b	8b	"Foul Weather Friends"	November 13, 2002
Two boys wander off into a forest where a hurricane occurs.
35	9	"Quake Me When It's Over"	November 20, 2002
Wendy is sent back in time to the 1906 San Francisco earthquake and must perform rescues without any modern equipment.
36a	10a	"Rock and a Hard Place"	November 27, 2002
A rock climber feels that he has no need for any weather training. When he does a solo mountain climb, he gets caught in a deadly storm and Rocky must get to him before the elements do.
36b	10b	"Cruise into Danger"	November 27, 2002
A floating high school encounters a deadly cyclone and other hazards while cruising the South Seas. A doubtful boy will realize that he has something important to contribute when faced with a deadly challenge.
37a	11a	"Not on This Planet"	December 4, 2002
A spaceship that a group of students are studying accidentally lifts off, sending them into orbit. They will have to put their differences aside and work as a team to make it back to Earth.
37b	11b	"Tunnel Vision"	December 4, 2002
When a semi-truck carrying explosive material explodes in an underwater tunnel, the Rescue Heroes are called into action.
38	12	"Alone for the Holidays"	December 11, 2002
Rocky feels sorry for himself when he learns that he has drawn "Holiday Duty". A rescue and journey with an Eskimo woman and her son will help him find the true meaning of the holidays.
39a	13a	"Going with the Wind"	December 18, 2002
When the Santa Ana winds travel across Catalina Island, havoc occurs. Perry Chute and Rip Rockefeller go after a stray hang glider, Ariel and Rocky rescue a stray windsurfer, and Gil Gripper helps two boys aboard their catamaran.
39b	13b	"A Bridge too Frail"	December 18, 2002
A rockslide sets off a sequence of events near the El Chorro Gorge in Spain. Rocky is appointed team leader; however, his unorthodox decisions lead some of the other Rescue Heroes to question if he's the right person for the job.

== Broadcast and home media ==
Rescue Heroes premiered in Canada on Teletoon on October 2, 1999, until its final episode (as a film) aired on November 18, 2003. It ran for three seasons. In the United States, the series aired on both CBS, as part of the CBS Kidshow from October 2, 1999 to September 9, 2000; and Kids' WB, from 2001 to 2003. Occasionally, it aired on Toonzai/Vortexx in the early 2010s. Repeats aired on Qubo in 2009 until it ceased in 2021. Reruns were also formerly shown on Disney XD Canada until the channel's shutdown in 2025

In the 2000s, Fisher-Price released all volumes on VHS with the episode "Lava Alarm", Fisher-Price released volumes on DVD under the title "Adventure Collection".

As of 2023, the series is currently streaming free on NBC's Peacock service and Pluto TV.

Reruns are currently shown on Boomerang Canada.

== Revival series ==
Rescue Heroes
- Created by: Fisher-Price
- Written by: Derek Pietras
- Starring: Jason Paquettee; Wellington Saygbay; Patrick Pedraza; Giorgio Cavalli; Peter Kim; Stephanie McKeon Riabko; Nzinga Blake; Katherin Kennard
- Country of origin: United States
- Original language: English
- No. of seasons: 1
- No. of episodes: 14

Production
- Running time: 5 minutes
- Production company: Fisher-Price

Original release
- Network: YouTube
- Release: April 16, 2019

On April 16, 2019, Fisher-Price revived the Rescue Heroes series exclusively for YouTube. Each five minute episode aired on Fisher-Price's YouTube channel.

The revival introduced several new characters while maintaining two characters from the original TV show – Billy Blazes and Rocky Canyon.

=== Characters ===
- Billy Blazes (Jason Paquettee) – The team leader of the Rescue Heroes. Billy hails from Quebec.
- Carlos Kitbash (Patrick Pedraza) – A rescue cadet, who is also a mechanic, that hails from Cuba.
- Forrest Fuego (Giorgio Cavalli) – A fire rescue cadet hailing from Colombia. His favorite sport is soccer.
- Reed Vitals (Peter Kim) – A medical rescue cadet hailing from South Korea.
- Richmond "Rocky" Canyon (Wellington Saygbay) – No longer the rookie, Rocky, a mountain climbing specialist, is now a Mountain Rescue Hero.
- Sandy O'Shin (Stephanie McKeon Riabko) – A water rescue cadet hailing from Ireland.
- Sky Justice (Nzinga Blake) – An air rescue cadet hailing from Nigeria; she is the daughter of former Rescue Heroes member Jake Justice.
- Al Valanche (John Doe)– A seasoned snowboarder hailing from France. He has a pet lynx named Claws.
- A.R.I.N (Katherin Kennard) – The artificial intelligence of the Rescue Heroes who gives them their missions.

=== Episodes ===
No.	Title	Original release date
1	"Earthquake in Africa"	April 16, 2019
An earthquake has rocked southern Africa, derailing a train on a bridge and leaving passengers stranded. The Rescue Heroes use teamwork and a transforming firetruck to save the day.
2	"Sub Down Under"	April 16, 2019
Scientists on a submarine near the Great Barrier Reef lose power and become trapped underwater. Sandy O'Shin, Reed Vitals, and Carlos Kitbash come to the rescue, saving both the scientists and the endangered coral reef.
3	"Tornado of Fire"	April 16, 2019
The Rescue Heroes are called to put out a wildfire that is swirling through the countryside. Forrest Fuego uses his advanced knowledge of forest fires to create a firebreak and Rocky learns the value of teamwork.
4	"The Great Big Wave"	April 16, 2019
The Rescue Heroes leap into action when they learn that a city in Sri Lanka has been hit with a tsunami. Sky learns to take the lead and Sandy helps some baby sea turtles get back home.
5	"Facing Your Fears"	April 16, 2019
The Rescue Heroes are off to Colombia to help a town in need. Forrest has a fear of water. Later, he learns how to face his fears and manages to swim safely in the ocean, rescuing those in need.
6	"Calm Under Pressure"	April 16, 2019
The Rescue Heroes go to England to help people in need. Carlos uses his new invention M.A.N.N.I.E. to help save people and learns how to stay calm when he is frustrated.
7	"Lava on the Loose!"	April 16, 2019
The Rescue Heroes are off to Costa Rica to help people in need. Both Carlos and Sky learn the importance of sharing and getting along with the team.
8	"Tornado Alley!"	April 16, 2019
Billy and the Rescue Heroes are called to the midwestern United States to help as a tornado creates a path of destruction through a major city. Sandy learns that she has valuable skills on the land as well as the sea.
9	"The Iceberg and Oil Spill"	April 16, 2019
The Rescue Heroes respond to a sinking oil tanker which has created a massive oil spill in an Arctic waterway. They must rescue sailors, clean up the oil, and help save some feathery friends along the way.
10	"Billy Blazes Gets Sick!"	April 16, 2019
The Rescue Heroes are off to The Great Wall of China. Billy learns it is just as important to take care of yourself as it is for you to take care of others.
11	"The Maze!"	April 16, 2019
The Rescue Heroes explore an ancient maze, which is filled with tunnels, in order to rescue archeologists. Meanwhile, Sky learns how to overcome a personal obstacle of her own.
12	"Rescue in the Desert"	April 16, 2019
The Rescue Heroes are called to the Sahara Desert to rescue a group of athletes. Reed learns to speak up more so he can help his team be the best they can be.
13	"Learning to Make Friends"	April 16, 2019
The Rescue Heroes are called to help save a group of hikers who are stuck in the snowy French Alps. The team meets a search and rescue expert named Al Valanche and his pet lynx, Claws. They learn the value of making new friends and listening to others.
14	"Recycling Matters!"	April 16, 2019
The newest Rescue Heroes, Al Valanche and Claws, join the team on a mission to the North Sea where an island of garbage is threatening aquatic animals. Sandy takes the lead and helps the team learn about the dangers of single-use plastics and the importance of recycling.
