= Martin Roach =

Canadian actor (born 1962)

- Born: Martin Jamie Roach; July 15, 1962 (age 64); Winnipeg, Manitoba, Canada
- Education: University of Windsor
- Occupation: Actor
- Years active: 1995–present
- Known for: Aaron Stone; Yin Yang Yo! Inspector Gadget; See; The Expanse

Martin Jamie Roach (born July 15, 1962) is a Canadian actor. He is best known for his live-action roles as T. Abner Hall in the Disney XD television series Aaron Stone (2009–2010), Mike in the science-fiction television series Falling Skies (2011), Admiral Michael Souther in the television series The Expanse (2015–2018), King Oberon in the fantasy television series The Other Kingdom (2016), Pastor Evan Miller in The Wedding Planners (2020), and Captain Gosset in the Apple TV+ television series See (2021–2022).

His roles on film include Robert P. Haskell in the science-fiction film Cube Zero (2004), Brewster Fuller in the drama film The Shape of Water (2017), Sheriff Paul Greenleaf in the holiday romantic comedy film Christmas Inheritance, Officer Dave Poveda in the holiday comedy film The Christmas Chronicles (2018), Richard in the thriller film The Oak Room (2020), and Marty in the comedy film The Man from Toronto (2022).

His voice roles include Jake Justice in Rescue Heroes, Dr. Claw in the 2015 animated series Inspector Gadget (2015–2018), Pastor Jerome Jeffries in the Far Cry franchise, Captain Omar Maalsuwda in The Sojourn, Yo in Yin Yang Yo!, and Spike (Note: Previously voiced by Cathy Weseluck in My Little Pony: Friendship Is Magic and Tabitha St. Germain in My Little Pony: Pony Life) in My Little Pony: Make Your Mark (2023).

== Early life ==
Roach was born in Winnipeg, the youngest of four children to Merle, a social worker who also ran a neighbourhood daycare and Winston Roach, a church leader who were both Jamaican immigrants. They moved to Toronto in 1969 where he grew up in the Riverdale neighbourhood.

== Career ==
For animation, he voiced Jake Justice in Rescue Heroes, Sparkie in the US version of Mike the Knight and Agram in Magi-Nation. From 2015 to 2018, he provided the voice of the main antagonist Dr. Claw in the animated reboot series Inspector Gadget. Roach has also lent in the voice of Pastor Jerome Jeffries in the PlayStation 4 video game Far Cry 5.

In 2022, he played Marty in the action comedy film The Man from Toronto, starring Kevin Hart, Woody Harrelson, and Kaley Cuoco.

== Filmography ==
=== Film ===
Year	Title	Role	Notes
1996	Extreme Measures	E.R. Doctor	
1999	Pushing Tin	Pilot Voice (voice)	
2000	Bait	Cop	
2001	Blue Hill Avenue	Uncle Pee Wee	
2001	Don't Say a Word	Transit Cop	
2002	Paid in Full	D.C. #2	
2003	Rescue Heroes: The Movie	Jake Justice (voice)	
2004	Highwaymen	Detective	
2004	Cube Zero	Robert P. Haskell	
2005	Fever Pitch	Husband	
2007	Bottom Feeder	Otis	
2007	Diary of the Dead	Stranger	
2008	Kit Kittredge: An American Girl	Hobo Doctor	
2010	Lullaby for Pi	The Father	
2011	Dream House	Tommy	
2013	Kick-Ass 2	Mother Russia Cop	
2015	No Stranger Than Love	Sheriff Deputy	
2015	Spotlight	Cop in Coffee Shop	
2015	Beeba Boys	Jeet Prosecutor	
2016	Only I...	Jim	
2017	High-Rise Rescue	Chief Connors	
2017	The Shape of Water	Brewster Fuller	
2017	Christmas Inheritance	Sheriff Paul Greenleaf	
2018	Every Day	Reverend Poole	
2018	Little Italy	Officer Hardaz	
2018	The Christmas Chronicles	Officer Dave Poveda	
2019	The Prodigy	Dr. Kagan	
2019	Shazam!	Bill Parker	
2019	Disappearance at Clifton Hill	Canadian Border Agent	
2019	Code 8	Captain Milltown	
2020	The Oak Room	Richard	
2021	All My Puny Sorrows	Psychiatrist Johns	
2022	The Man from Toronto	Marty	
2024	Humane	Tony	
2024	You Gotta Believe	Sam Knight	

=== Television ===
Year	Title	Role	Notes
1996	Goosebumps	Mr. Finley	Episode: "You Can't Scare Me!"
1996	PSI Factor: Chronicles of the Paranormal	Technician	Episode: "Reptilian Revenge/Ghostly Voices"
1997	Riverdale	Jerome "Tiny" Sheffield	Unknown episodes
1997	Goosebumps	Man in Black #2	Episode: "Don't Go to Sleep"
1998	The Wall	Calvin	Television movie
1998	Universal Soldier III: Unfinished Business	Orderly	Television movie
1999	Total Recall 2070	Dr. Levy	Episode: "Brain Fever"
1999	Mythic Warriors	Lycopheus (voice)	Episode: "Androcles and the Lion"
1999–2000	The Avengers: United They Stand	Samuel "Sam" Wilson / Falcon (voice)	13 episodes
1999–2000	Rescue Heroes	Jake Justice (voice)	40 episodes
2000	Dirty Pictures	Ed	Television movie
2000	Hendrix	Black Panther	Television movie
2000	The Last Debate	Room Service Waiter	Television movie
2000	Code Name: Eternity	Nolan	Episode: "Project Midas"
2000	Twice in a Lifetime	Dwight White	Episode: "Used Hearts"
2000–2002	Soul Food	Gino / Butter	Episodes: "Truth Be Told" and "Empty Spaces"
2001	Blackout	Police Officer	Television movie
2001	Bojangles	Percy	Television movie
2001	Doc	Blind Man	Episode: "Blind Alley"
2001	Paradise Falls	Trevor Harman / Ravenheart	7 episodes
2001	Our Hero	Tommy	Episode: "The Birthday Issue"
2002	An American in Canada	Matt Dawson	Episode: "Pilot"
2002	Cadet Kelly	Drill Instructor	Television movie
2003	Sue Thomas: F.B.Eye	Curtis Sanford	Episode: "Dirty Bomb"
2003	The Pentagon Papers	Sergeant Watson	Television movie
2003	Mutant X	Owen Taylor	Episode: "Reawakening"
2003	Street Time	Alfa Goodman	Episode: "Even"
2003	1-800-Missing	Agent Avery Nash	3 episodes
2003	Slings & Arrows	Horatio	Episodes: "Madness in Great Ones" and "Playing the Swan"
2003–2004	Knights of the Zodiac	Grand Pope (voice)	39 episodes English version
2004	Redemption: The Stan Tookie Williams Story	Guard Morales	Television movie
2004–2005	Puppets Who Kill	Defence Lawyer / Jones	Episodes: "Bill Sues" and "The CBC Is Killing Again"
2004–2010	Franny's Feet	Joey the Dogsled, Additional Voices (voice)	6 episodes
2005	The Eleventh Hour	Detective Glen Madison	Episode: "The Miracle Worker"
2005	Slam Dunk	Takenori Akagi (voice)	English version
2005	Time Warp Trio	York, Cooky, Ngombo (voice)	Episode: "Jinga All the Way"
2005	Mayday	Carl Fessell	Television movie
2006	Cradle of Lies	Detective Buck	Television movie
2006	Z-Squad	Bakoo (voice)	Unknown episodes
2006	Bigfoot Presents: Meteor and the Mighty Monster Trucks	Big Wheelie (voice)	Episode: "Race Relations"
2006–2009	Yin Yang Yo!	Master Yo (voice)	52 episodes
2007–2010	Magi-Nation	Agram, Gorath (voice)	52 episodes
2007	Cyberchase	Walter the Walrus, Professor Bob de Bob Bobsen (voice)	3 episodes
2008	A Raisin in the Sun	Walter Lee, Sr.	Television movie
2008	Roxy Hunter and the Horrific Halloween	Pierre	Television movie
2009	Before You Say I Do	Paramedic #1	Television movie
2009	Everything She Ever Wanted	Mark Edwards	Television miniseries
2009–2010	Aaron Stone	T. Abner Hall	20 episodes
2009–2011	Poppets Town	Alli (voice)	26 episodes
2010	Harriet the Spy: Blog Wars	Alfred Cooper	Television movie
2010	Doodlebops Rockin' Road Show	Head T-Rex, Professor Poochini (voices)	Episode: "Don't Forget to Ask/Bop Bop's New Tricks"
2010	Dan for Mayor	Mr. Swifty	Episode: "Revenge Is Swifty"
2010	Covert Affairs	Commanding Officer	Episode: "Pilot"
2010	Unnatural History	Executor	Episode: "Fountain of Truth"
2010	Connor Undercover	Vice-Principal Grimsby	Episodes: "Cover Story" and "Password Protect"
2011	Good Dog	Gerry Davis	Episode: "Jack Nicholson"
2011	XIII: The Series		Episode: "Hunting Party"
2011	Jimmy Two-Shoes	Slugmeister (voice)	Episode: "Good Old Jimmy/Slime, Slimy, Slimiest"
2011	Falling Skies	Mike Thompson	5 episodes
2011	Against the Wall	Nick	Episode: "The Fifth Body"
2011	Combat Hospital	Lieutenant Cliffgood	Episode: "Do No Harm"
2011	Silent Witness	Detective Tally	Television movie
2011	12 Dates of Christmas	Dr. Kirschner	Television movie
2011	Producing Parker	Dr. William Perry	Episode: "Lying Cheating Dirty Dogs"
2011–2013	Mike the Knight	Sparkie (voice)	US version
2011–2013	Crash Canyon	Reggie Manderbelt, The Widow (voice)	26 episodes
2012	Baby's First Christmas	NYPD Mountie	Television movie
2013	Hemlock Grove	Guard	Episodes: "Hello, Handsome" and "What Peter Can Live Without"
2013	Air Crash Investigation	Captain Negasa	Episode: "Heading to Disaster"
2013	The Listener	Armoured Van Driver	Episode: "The Blue Line"
2013	Oh Christmas Tree!	Malcolm	Television movie
2013	Sidekick	Superintendent (voice)	Episode: "Those Who Can't Teach/Graduation Daze"
2014	Sorority Surrogate	Channing	Television movie
2014	How to Build a Better Boy	Coach Voss	Television movie
2015	Rogue	Tyson Ballard	Episode: "The Chandelier Man"
2015	Beauty and the Beast	Lieutenant Tran	Episode: "Sins of the Fathers"
2015–2017	Odd Squad	Fladam	4 episodes
2015–2018	The Expanse	Admiral Michael Souther	9 episodes
2015–2018	Inspector Gadget	Dr. Claw, Salesman, Mama Claw, MAD Henchman #3 (1), MAD Agent #1 (1), HQ Agent (3), Additional Voices (voices)	52 episodes
2016	Man Seeking Woman	Ramirez	Episode: "Fuse"
2016	The Other Kingdom	King Oberon	12 episodes
2016	Fangbone!	Stoneback (voice)	Episode: "The Back of Stone"
2016	Terrific Trucks	Tork (voice)	12 episodes
2016	Suits	Parole Board Chairman	Episode: "The Hand That Feeds You"
2016	The Strain	James	Episode: "Gone But Not Forgotten"
2016	Four in the Morning	Doug Wilson	Episodes: "Blow" and "Four Christs"
2016	Terrific Trucks Save Christmas	Tork (voice)	Television movie
2016	Eyewitness	FBI Agent	Episode: "They Lied"
2016–2017	Atomic Puppet	Robo Ron (voice)	29 episodes
2017	Conviction	Detective John Moore	Episode: "Not Okay"
2017	Incorporated	Lionel	Episodes: "Executables" and "Golden Parachute"
2017	Saving Hope	Eric Hawes	Episode: "Gutted"
2017	Good Witch	Delivery Guy	Episode: "Day After Day"
2017	Dino Dana	Dr. Webster	Episode: "Get That Incisivosaurus - Dino Sight"
2017	Salvation	Griff	Episode: "Chip Off the Ol'Block"
2017–2018	Hotel Transylvania: The Series	Various male character voices (voice)	2 episodes
2017–2018	Wishfart	Fireball Cat (voice)	40 episodes
2017–2020	The Magic School Bus Rides Again	Mr. Ruhle (voice)	Recurring cast
2018	Falling Water	Lieutenant Robert Sutton	Episode: "Love Is a Dreamer"
2018	Designated Survivor	Defense Secretary Nick Wooster	Episodes: "Fallout" and "Overkill"
2018	Max Voltage	Additional Voices	Unknown episodes
2018	Private Eyes	Julian Barrington	Episode: "Finding Leroy"
2018	Cupcake & Dino: General Services	Additional Voices (voice)	Episode: "The Manly Men's Man Club/Mi Casa, Robo Casa"
2018	Titans	Manny Wolf	Episode: "Titans"
2018	Esme & Roy	Daddy Ooga, Norm (voices)	3 episodes
2018	Once Upon a Christmas Miracle	Dr. Jenkins	Television movie
2019	Wayne	Local Sergeant	Episode: "Chapter Seven: It'll Last Forever"
2019	Northern Rescue	Insurance Adjuster	Episode: "Making Lemonade"
2019	Schitt's Creek	Dr. Litman	Episode: "The Hike"
2019	Hudson & Rex	Father Xavier	Episode: "Haunted by the Past"
2019	Killjoys	Captain Pike	Episode: "Three Mutineers"
2019	Creeped Out	Julian Tuthill	Episode: "Only Child"
2019	Love Alaska	Jasper	Television movie
2019	The Christmas Chalet	Steve	Television movie
2019–2020	Bakugan: Battle Planet	Colonel Tripp, Wynton's Dad, Brawler (voice)	English dub 10 episodes
2020	Self Made: Inspired by the Life of Madam C.J. Walker	Theodore	Episode: "Bootstraps"; Television miniseries
2020	Kim's Convenience	Randy	Episode: "Knife Strife"
2020	Love in Harmony Valley	Felix	Television movie
2020	Ghostwriter	Alex Redmond	Episodes: "The Ghostly Paintbrush: Parts 1 & 2"
2020	A Christmas Exchange	Jim	Television movie
2020	The Wedding Planners	Pastor Evan Miller	6 episodes
2020–2021	Hero Elementary	Dr. Martin Inventor Man, Movie Narrator (voice)	6 episodes
2020–2021	Locke & Key	Detective Daniel Matuku	8 episodes
2021	American Gods	Gilbert	Episode: "The Unseen"
2021	Heritage Minutes	Daniel Peterson	Episode: "Oscar Peterson"
2021	Nurses	Dex Anthony	Episode: "The Wish Factory"
2021	The Enchanted Christmas Cake	George	Television movie
2021	Big Blue	Inspector Hammer (voice)	2 episodes
2021–2023	Go, Dog. Go!	Paw Barker (voice)	US version
2021–2022	See	Captain Gosset	12 episodes
2022	Reacher	Picard	5 episodes
2022	Transformers: BotBots	Vomit Comet, Ol' Tic Toc (voices)	Episode: "Mall Than Meets the Eye / (Never) Be Yourself"
2022	Total DramaRama	Additional Voices (voice)	Episode: "A Bridgette Too Far"
2022	The Sojourn	Captain Omar Maalsuwada	Episode: "Beneath the Banner"
2023–present	Rubble & Crew	Grandpa Gravel (voice)	Main cast
2023–present	Red Ketchup	Philip G. Sullivan, Nerd #2, Fan Voices (voice)	Main cast
2023	Transplant	Hugo	Episode: "Unstuck in Time"
2023	Most Dangerous Game	Dupree	Recurring cast
2023	Essex County	Officer Danny Laraque	Television miniseries
2023	The Jane Mysteries: Lost Inheritance	Kenny Martin	Television movie
2023	The Horror of Dolores Roach	Victor	Episode: "Stop Me"
2023	Open Season: Call of Nature	Gunner (voice)	Episode: "Duty Calls/Finding Dinkleman"
2023	My Little Pony: Make Your Mark	Spike (voice)	3 episodes
2024	Hunting Housewives	Andre Bouvier	Television movie
2024	Tracker	Clay Porter	Episode: "St. Louis"
2024	The Umbrella Academy	CIA Deputy Director Lance Ribbons	4 episodes
2024	Cruel Intentions	Vice President Grover	Episode: "Beta"
2025	The Institute	Chief Ashworth	Main cast
2025	The Last Frontier	Steven Cole	Recurring cast
2026	Star Trek: Starfleet Academy	Dekol Kraag	Episode: "Vox in Excelso"

=== Video games ===
Year	Title	Role	Notes
1999	Transformers: Beast Wars Transmetals	Ravage, Tigatron (voices)	
2000	Resident Evil – Code: Veronica	Rodrigo Juan Raval (voice)	
2017	Assassin's Creed: Origins	Additional Voices	
2018	Starlink: Battle for Atlas	Additional Voices	
2018	Far Cry 5	Pastor Jerome Jeffries (voice)	
2019	Far Cry New Dawn	Pastor Jerome Jeffries (voice)	
2021	Far Cry 6	Pastor Jerome Jeffries (voice)	
2023	Avatar: Frontiers of Pandora	Kin	
