= Mike Sheerin =

Canadian television producer

Mike Sheerin is a Canadian, Toronto-based television producer. He started Architect Films - which currently produces Decked Out, Deck Wars and Ice Cold Cash. Before starting Architect Films in 2010, Mike Sheerin was a documentary director/producer. His documentaries include: Hunting Arrows (CBC Newsworld, 2001), The Biographer's Voice (CBC/90th Parallel Productions, 2005), The Degrassi Story (CTV/90th Parallel Productions, 2005), The Secret Mulroney Tapes (CBC/90th Parallel, 2005), Encounters with Moses (CBC/90th Parallel, 2006), Welcome to Canadaville (CTV/90th Parallel, 2007), Bravo Company: Kandahar (History Television/90th Parallel, 2007) and The Path to War (Global/90th Parallel, 2008).

Sheerin won the 2008 Gemini award for Best Photography in a Documentary (Bravo Company: Kandahar). He has been nominated for three other Gemini awards: Best Biography Documentary (The Biographer's Voice), Best History Documentary (The Secret Mulroney Tapes) and Best Direction in a Documentary (The Secret Mulroney Tapes).
