= Andrew Pifko =

Canadian actor

- Occupation: Actor
- Years active: 1999–present
- Relatives: Cara Pifko (sister)

Andrew Pifko is a Canadian actor, who has worked on numerous projects since beginning his career in 1999.

== Early life ==
Pifko was born to Esther Pifko (née Taub). His younger sister is Cara, who is an actress in her own right.

== Career ==
Pifko has both appeared as and voiced various characters in several television shows such as Queer as Folk, Rescue Heroes, and 'Til Death Do Us Part. He also voiced the playable character Aldo Trapani in The Godfather video game, which is based on the film The Godfather.

== Filmography ==
=== Film ===
Year	Title	Role	Notes
1999	Hidden Agenda	Hospital Attendant	
2001	In Camera	Officer Fulton Dial	
2002	Fancy Dancing	Hobo	Uncredited
2003	Rescue Heroes: The Movie	Matt Medic	Voice role
2003	The Gospel of John	Tristan Gemmill Philip	
2016	Why You Won't Actually Move to Canada: Even If Trump Wins	Abby	Short film Direct-to-video
2016	Game of Thrones Divorce	Agon Dewarian	Short film
2018	The Maestro	Henry Mancini	
2018	Escape	Dad	Short film
2018	Daddy Issues	Simon Craw	
2019	Playmobil: The Movie	S.K.U.L.L. Scientist (voice)	

=== Television ===
Year	Title	Role	Notes
1999	Comedy Central Presents - Elvira Kurt	Featured Comic	
1999–2002	Rescue Heroes	Matt Medic (voice)	Recurring cast
2001	Blue Murder	Russell Tammen	Episodes: "Black Sheep" and "All Saints"
2002	Queer as Folk	Quentin	Episode: "Wherever That Dream May Lead You"
2002–2011	Elemental Dragons	Duke Decker (voice)	280 episodes
2003	Playmakers	Doctor	Episode: "Choice: Part 2"
2003–2004	An American in Canada	Guest Star	
2004–2005	Da Boom Crew	Elder Pentaped, Additional Voice (voice)	13 episodes
2006	At the Hotel	Pete	Episodes: "Welcome to the Rousseau" and "I F***ed Lou Reed"
2006-2009	Tank Overhaul	Narrator (voice)	8 episodes
2007	Bakugan Battle Brawlers	Naga	Episode: "Bakugan Battle Begins"
2007	'Til Death Do Us Part	Darin Prescott	Episode: "The Pond Scum Murder"
2007	Across the River to Motor City	Doctor Green	Episode: "Stranger in the House"
2007	Erky Perky	Armandor (voice)	Episode: "Broken Wings"
2007	Magi-Nation	Adar (voice)	
2007	Hoff's New Direction	Jeremy Lalonde	Television film
2010	Octane Pistols of Fury	Vinny	Television film
2010	Missed Connections Live	Rabbi	Episode: "When Morty Met Esther"
2012	The Mentalist	Wyck Theissens	Episode: "Red Is the New Black"
2012	The Big C	Eduardo	Episodes: "Vaya Con Dios" and "Fly Away"
2012	Mike & Molly	Priest	Episode: "Karaoke Christmas"
2012–2013	Two and a Half Men	Man	Episodes: "Give Santa a Tail-Hole" and "Welcome to Alancrest"
2012	A.N.T. Farm	Bruce	Episode: "EndurANTs"
2012	Gravity Falls	Additional Voice	Episode: "Dipper vs. Manliness"
2013	Childrens Hospital	Steve Perry	Episode: "Imaginary Friends"
2016	Legends of Tomorrow	Godfrey	Episode: "Marooned"
2017	Tiny House, Big Living	Narrator (voice)	Episode: "The Simple Container Life"
2017	Screen Junkies Roasts	Walt Disney	Episode: "Screen Junkies Presents: The Roast of Beauty and the Beast"
2017	NCIS: Los Angeles	Maitre' D / Steffen	Episode: "Getaway"
2017	Criminal Minds	The Doctor	Episode: "Wheels Up"
2018	Timeless	Young Rudy Giuliani	Episode: "The Day Reagan Was Shot"
2019	Mom	Man	Episode: "A Whistling Nostril and a Ball of Fire"
2019	Carmen Sandiego	Antonio / El Topo, Miro (voices)	4 episodes
2019–20	Dwight in Shining Armor	Macklyn the Fox	Episodes: "Shackled", "Dragon", and "Biffels"

=== Video games ===
Year	Title	Role	Notes
2006	The Godfather	Aldo "The Player" Trapani (voice)	Based on The Godfather films
2006	The Godfather: Mob Wars	Aldo "The Player" Trapani (voice)	
2006	Tom Clancy's Rainbow Six: Vegas	Logan Keller, Brody Lukin (voices)	
2007	The Godfather: The Don's Edition	Aldo "The Player" Trapani (voice)	
2007	The Godfather: Blackhand Edition	Aldo "The Player" Trapani (voice)	
2011	TERA: The Exiled Realm of Arborea	Baraka Elder, Castanic, High Elf (voices)	
2012	Hitman: Absolution	Additional Voices (voice)	
2014	The Elder Scrolls Online	Additional Voices (voice)	
2019	Rage 2	Wellspring Guard Captain, Winners Lounge, River Hog Narrative (voices)	
