= Rescue Heroes: The Movie =

- DVD Cover
- Directed by: Ron Pitts
- Written by: Brent Piaskoski
- Produced by: Pamela Lehn
- Starring: Norm Spencer; Joseph Motiki; Lenore Zann; Deborah Odell; Rod Wilson; Martin Roach
- Edited by: Daniel Lee
- Music by: Amin Bhatia
- Production companies: Nelvana; Fisher-Price
- Distributed by: Artisan Home Entertainment (Family Home Entertainment) (United States); Alliance Atlantis (Canada)
- Release date: November 18, 2003
- Running time: 78 minutes
- Country: Canada
- Language: English

Rescue Heroes: The Movie is a 2003 Canadian direct-to-video animated film based on the TV series Rescue Heroes.

== Plot ==
After rescuing the citizens of in the fictional city of Berkheiser, North Dakota, from an earthquake, the Rescue Heroes are sent to Ecuador to evacuate two reporters who are trapped in a crashed helicopter following an eruption of the Mount Sangay volcano. While climbing the volcano, Rocky Canyon, out of overconfidence, neglects to use the piton gloves, resulting in both him and Billy Blazes falling off the mountain. He brings Billy to safety and the two are able to rescue the reporters. Billy later reprimands Rocky for both his recklessness and for not relying on his teammates for help.

Meanwhile, a series of atypical thunderstorms begins to occur around the world, resulting in numerous natural disasters on a global scale. Billy dispatches the Rescue Heroes around the world to deal with these events, and reluctantly sends Rocky to Geis, Switzerland, to act as backup following a major avalanche. While rescuing a snowboarder, Rocky deviates from orders and takes a dangerous path down the mountain, consequently coming into the path of another avalanche. Both Rocky and the snowboarder are able to escape safely, but Billy suspends Rocky from field duty. While Billy attempts to repair a damaged dam on the Pa Sak River in Thailand, he suddenly blacks out, causing the dam to collapse and the river to flood. Billy falls ill and loses consciousness, but is rescued by Jack Hammer, who puts a rope on the Hyperjet, bringing Billy safely away from the damaged dam.

The Rescue Heroes identify that the storms originated from Sangay; and deduce that the lightning is a product of a previously unidentified magnetic element in the volcanic ash. The storms are being drawn north by the Earth's magnetic field and, when they converge, they will explode, resulting in global cataclysm. Meanwhile, Rocky discovers that Billy's illness is due to a poisonous plant he came in contact with during the Sangay mission. Blaming himself for Billy's injury, Rocky volunteers to go with Wendy Waters to recover the plant's root from the volcano to cure Billy.

Rocky is given permission to go with Wendy to retrieve the antidote. They tell Matt Medic that they are bringing Billy in the Hyperjet back to Ecuador in order to retrieve the antidote, which Matt agrees. While in the Hyperjet, Rocky deduces that a message he heard from Billy earlier, "out of many, one," was referring to lightning bolts, and that the storms can be stopped by using a lightning rod to ground their electricity. He tells the other Rescue Heroes and Jake Justice contacts the United Nations, resulting in both the Rescue Heroes and countries working together to build an enormous, mile-high lightning rod in Greenland.

During the construction, Jack Hammer is injured and the Rescue Heroes’ jet cable is fused to the top of the tower by a lightning strike. Rocky and a cured Billy are able to rescue Jack and disconnect the cable. The rod is completed, bringing an end to the storms.

At the Mountain Action Command Center, Rocky apologizes to Billy for his behavior, and Billy apologizes as well for not being forward with his illness. Much to Rocky's surprise and delight, Billy promotes him to Mission Select Team Leader.

== Cast ==
- Norm Spencer as Billy Blazes
- Joseph Motiki as Rocky Canyon
- Lenore Zann as Wendy Waters
- Deborah Odell as Ariel Flyer
- Rod Wilson as Jack Hammer
- Martin Roach as Jake Justice
- Cathal J. Dodd as Rip Rockefeller
- Andrew Pifko as Matt Medic
- John Bourgeois as Warren Waters
- Christopher Earle as Roger Houston
- Donald Burda as Pat Pending
- Edward Glen as Al Pine
- Andrew Sabiston as Bob Sled
- Tony Daniels as Hal E. Copter
- Dwayne Hill as Sam Sparks
- Katie Griffin as Penny Pooler
- Colin Glazer as Tony
- Jeff Berg as Rich
- Christopher Jacot as Wayne
- Alex House as Brent
- Melanie Tonello as Girl
- Sunday Muse as Mom

== Production ==
The movie was announced by Corus Entertainment on June 25, 2003, where it was confirmed that Artisan Entertainment had acquired North American rights to the movie, where it would be released straight-to-video on VHS and DVD in November 2003, with a limited theatrical release if needed.

In Canada, the movie was distributed by Alliance Atlantis, due to a distribution agreement Artisan held with them that occurred a few years prior.
