= List of awards and nominations received by Heartland =

Heartland awards and nominations
Awards and nominations
Award	Wins	Nominations

Totals (Note: Certain award groups do not simply award one winner. They acknowledge several different recipients, have runners-up, and have third place. Since this is a specific recognition and is different from losing an award, runner-up mentions are considered wins in this award tally. For simplification and to avoid errors, each award in this list has been presumed to have had a prior nomination.)
- Wins: 18
- Nominations: 85

Heartland is a Canadian dramatic television series, it follows sisters Amy and Lou Fleming, their grandfather Jack Bartlett, and Ty Borden, through the highs and lows of life at their ranch.

== Total nominations and awards for the cast ==
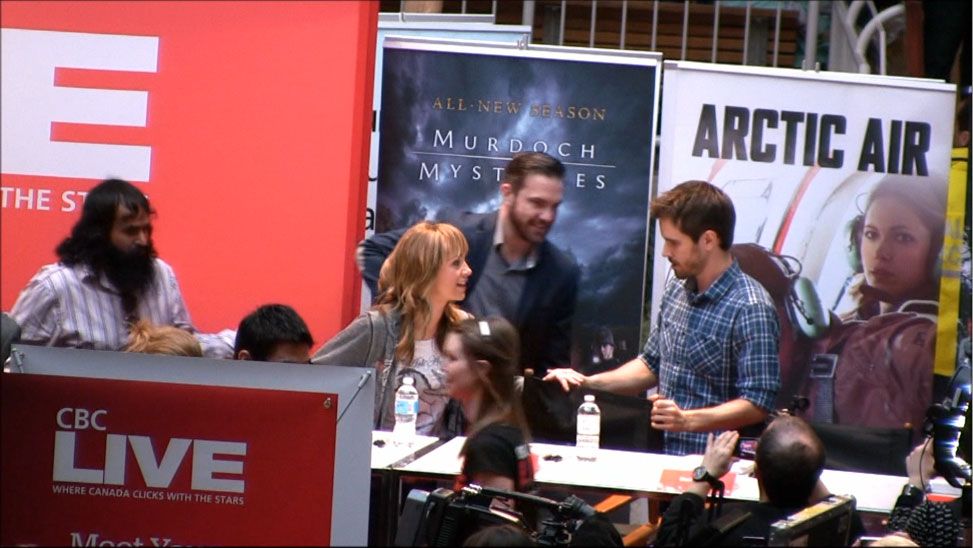
Amber Marshall (Amy) and Graham Wardle (Ty) appear together at a 2013 CBC event in Toronto

Actor	Nominations	Awards
Shaun Johnston	6	1
Alisha Newton	5	3
Amber Marshall	3	1
Graham Wardle	3	0
Julia Baker	2	0
Nathaniel Arcand	1	0

== Canadian Screen Awards ==
The Canadian Screen Awards are given annually by the Academy of Canadian Cinema & Television recognizing excellence in Canadian film, English-language television, and digital media. Heartland has two nominations, with one win.

Year	Category	Nominee	Result	Reference
2013	Canada’s Screen Star	Amber Marshall	Won	
2015	Best Cross-Platform Project, Fiction	Amy Cameron, Michael Clarke, Mike Evans, Fergus Heywood, Scott Lepp, Allen Martin, Drick Potvin, Jordy Randall, Eva Riinitze, Tyrone Warner, Zach Zahos (The Heartland Companion App)	Nominated	

== Directors Guild of Canada Awards ==
The Directors Guild of Canada hosts an annual awards ceremony recognizing achievement in directing, production design, picture and sound editing. Heartland has nine wins out of thirteen nominations.

Year	Category	Nominee	Result	Reference
2008	Best Television Series – Family	Don McBrearty, Lorenz Augustin, Hudson Cooley (Episode 107: Come What May)	Nominated	
2009	Best Television Series – Family	Ron Murphy, Lorenz Augustin, Hudson Cooley (Episode 204: Dancing in the Dark)	Won	
2010	Best Television Series – Family	Dean Bennett, Lorenz Augustin, Hudson Cooley (Episode 304: The Haunting of Hanley Barn)	Won	
2011	Best Television Series – Family	T.W. Peacocke, Lorenz Augustin, Hudson Cooley (Episode 407: Jackpot)	Won	
2011	Best Sound Editing - Television Movie/Mini-Series	Kevin Howard, Robert Hegedus, Richard Calistan, Marvyn Dennis, Kevin Banks, Jason MacNeill (A Heartland Christmas)	Won	
2012	Best Television Series – Family	Grant Harvey, Lorenz Augustin, Hudson Cooley (Episode 503: What's in a Name?)	Won	
2013	Best Television Series – Family	Stefan Scaini, Lorenz Augustin, Hudson Cooley (Episode 601: Running Against the Wind)	Won	
2013	Best Television Series – Family	Dean Bennett, Lorenz Augustin, Hudson Cooley (Episode 610: The Road Ahead)	Nominated	
2013	Best Sound Editing – Television Series	Kevin Banks, Richard Calistan, Robert Hegedus, Kevin Howard, and P. Jason MacNeill (Episode 610: The Road Ahead)	Nominated	
2014	Best Television Series – Family	Dean Bennett, Lorenz Augustin, Hudson Cooley, Joe D'Addetta (Episode 710: Darkness and Light)	Won	
2014	Best Television Series – Family	Stefan Scaini, Lorenz Augustin, Hudson Cooley (Episode 704: The Penny Drops)	Nominated	
2016	Outstanding Directorial Achievement in Family Series	Bruce McDonald (Episode 910: Before the Darkness)	Won	
2017	Outstanding Directorial Achievement in Family Series	Dean Bennett (Episode 1009: A Horse with No Rider)	Won	

== Gemini Awards ==
The Gemini Awards were annual awards given by the Academy of Canadian Cinema & Television to recognize achievements in English-language television. Heartland garnered nine nominations, with one win.

Year	Category	Nominee	Result	Reference
2008	Best Performance by an Actor in a Featured Supporting Role in a Dramatic Series	Shaun Johnston (episode: Nothing Endures)	Nominated	
2008	Best Sound in a Dramatic Series	Ron Osiowy, Paul Shubat, Steve Foster, Kevin Howard, Robert Hegedus, Sid Lieberman (episode: Born to Run)	Nominated	
2009	Best Sound in a Dramatic Series	Sid Lieberman, Steve Foster, Paul Shubat, Kevin Howard, Robert Hegedus, Richard Calistan, Ron Osiowy, Kevin Banks (episode: Sweetheart of the Rodeo)	Nominated	
2010	Best Writing in a Dramatic Series	Mark Haroun	Nominated	
2011	Best Original Music Score for a Program or Series	Keith Power (episode: Homecoming)	Nominated	
2011	Best Direction in a Dramatic Program or Mini-Series	Dean Bennett (A Heartland Christmas)	Nominated	
2011	Best Performance by an Actor in a Featured Supporting Role in a Dramatic Program or Mini-Series	Nicholas Campbell (A Heartland Christmas)	Nominated	
2011	Best Performance by an Actress in a Guest Role Dramatic Series	Alberta Watson (episode: Where the Truth Lies)	Won	
2011	Best Sound in a Dramatic Series	Paul Shubat, Kevin Banks, Steve Foster, Kevin Howard, Robert Hegedus, Richard Calistan, Ron Osiowy, Sid Lieberman (episode: Jackpot)	Nominated	

== Joey Awards ==
The Joey Awards are given annually to young Canadian performers in film and television. Heartland has been nominated eight times, winning twice.

Year	Category	Nominee	Result	Reference
2014	Young Actress age 14 or younger in a TV Series Drama Supporting/Recurring	Alisha Newton	Won	
2014	Young Actor age 12 or younger in a TV Series Drama Supporting/Recurring	Carson J. Pound	Nominated	
2015	Best Actress in a TV Drama Leading Role	Alisha Newton	Won	
2015	Best Actor in a TV Drama Recurring Role 8-12 Years	Carson J. Pound	Nominated	
2015	Best Actress in a TV Drama Guest Starring Role Age 9-12 Years	Julia Lalonde	Nominated	
2015	Best Actress in a TV Drama Featured Role 4-9 Years	Julia Baker	Nominated	
2016	Young Actress in a Drama TV Series Leading Role 14-18 Years	Alisha Newton	Nominated	
2016	Young Actress in a Drama TV Series Recurring Role 4-9 Years	Julia Baker	Nominated	

== Leo Awards ==
The Leo Awards are annual awards honouring the best in film and television in the province of British Columbia. Heartland has been nominated five times.

Year	Category	Nominee	Result	Reference
2009	Best Lead Performance by a Male in a Dramatic Series	Graham Wardle (episode: Summer’s End)	Nominated	
2010	Best Lead Performance by a Male in a Dramatic Series	Graham Wardle (episode: The Starting Gate)	Nominated	
2010	Best Screenwriting in a Dramatic Series	Ken Craw (episode: Quarantine)	Nominated	
2011	Best Screenwriting in a Dramatic Series	Ken Craw (episode: Family Business)	Nominated	
2012	Best Lead Performance by a Male in a Dramatic Series	Graham Wardle (episode: Beyond Hell's Half Mile)	Nominated	

== Rosie Awards ==
The Rosie Awards is the name given to the Alberta Film and Television Awards, presented annually by Alberta Media Production Industries Association (AMPIA).

Year	Category	Nominee	Result	Reference
2013	Best Dramatic Series	Tom Cox & Jordy Randall	Nominated	
2013	Best Director (Drama Over 30 Minutes)	Grant Harvey (episode: Helping Hands)	Nominated	
2013	Best Director (Drama Over 30 Minutes)	Dean Bennett (episode: The Road Ahead)	Nominated	
2013	Best Performance by an Alberta Actor	Nathaniel Arcand (episode: Waiting for Tomorrow)	Nominated	
2013	Best Performance by an Alberta Actor	Shaun Johnston (episode: The Road Ahead)	Nominated	
2013	Best Screenwriter (Drama Over 30 Minutes)	Mark Haroun (episode: Do The Right Thing)	Nominated	
2013	Best Cinematographer (Drama Over 30 Minutes)	Craig Wrobleski (episode: The Road Ahead)	Nominated	
2013	Best Editor (Drama Over 30 Minutes)	Ken Filewych (episode: The Road Ahead)	Nominated	
2013	Best Overall Sound (Drama Over 30 Minutes)	George Tarrant & Michael Leder (episode: Running Against The Wind)	Won	
2013	Best Production Designer/Art Director	Rick Roberts (episode: The Road Ahead)	Nominated	
2013	Best Costume Designer	Andre Ricard (episode: Helping Hands)	Nominated	
2013	Best Visual Effects - (Computer Generated)	Ken Bitz & Jason Lavoie (episode: Helping Hands)	Nominated	
2013	Best Visual Effects - (Practical)	Leo Weiser (episode: The Road Ahead)	Nominated	
2014	Best Dramatic Series	Tom Cox & Jordy Randall	Nominated	
2014	Best Director (Drama Over 30 Minutes)	Dean Bennett (episode: There But For Fortune)	Nominated	
2014	Best Performance by an Alberta Actor	Shaun Johnston (episode: Under Pressure)	Nominated	
2014	Best Screenwriter (Drama Over 30 Minutes)	Mark Haroun (episode: Best Man)	Nominated	
2014	Best Cinematographer (Drama Over 30 Minutes)	Craig Wrobleski (episode: There But For Fortune)	Won	
2014	Best Editor (Drama Over 30 Minutes)	Ken Filewych (episode: There But For Fortune)	Nominated	
2014	Best Overall Sound (Drama Over 30 Minutes)	George Tarrant & Roger Roscoe (episode: There But For Fortune)	Nominated	
2014	Best Production Designer/Art Director	Rick Roberts (episode: Picking Up the Pieces)	Nominated	
2014	Best Costume Designer	Andre Ricard (episode: Picking Up the Pieces)	Nominated	
2014	Best Visual Effects - (Practical)	Leo Weiser (episode: Picking Up the Pieces)	Nominated	
2015	Best Dramatic Series	Tom Cox & Jordy Randall	Nominated	
2015	Best Web Series	Jordy Randall & Scott Lepp (episode: Heartland Companion App)	Nominated	
2015	Best Director (Drama Over 30 Minutes)	Dean Bennett (episode: The Heart of a River)	Nominated	
2015	Best Performance by an Alberta Actor	Shaun Johnston (episode: Be Careful What You Wish For)	Nominated	
2015	Best Screenwriter (Drama Over 30 Minutes)	Mark Haroun (episode: Broken Heartland)	Nominated	
2015	Best Cinematographer (Drama Over 30 Minutes)	Craig Wrobleski (episode: Secrets and Lies)	Won	
2015	Best Overall Sound (Drama Over 30 Minutes)	George Tarrant & Jesse Sanderson & Les Pahl (episode: The Heart of a River)	Nominated	
2016	Best Dramatic Series	Tom Cox & Jordy Randall	Nominated	
2016	Best Digital or Interactive Project	Jordy Randall & Scott Lepp (@GeorgieFlemingMorris)	Nominated	
2016	Best Director (Drama Over 30 Minutes)	Dean Bennett (episode: Ties of the Earth)	Nominated	
2016	Best Performance by an Alberta Actor	Shaun Johnston (episode: Ties of the Earth)	Nominated	
2016	Best Performance by an Alberta Actress	Amber Marshall (episode: Written in Stone)	Nominated	
2016	Best Screenwriter (Drama Over 30 Minutes)	Mark Haroun (episode: All I Need is You)	Nominated	
2016	Best Cinematographer (Drama Over 30 Minutes)	Craig Wrobleski (episode: Darkness Before Dawn)	Nominated	
2016	Best Editor (Drama Over 30 Minutes)	Ken Filewych (episode: Darkness Before Dawn)	Nominated	
2016	Best Overall Sound (Drama Over 30 Minutes)	George Tarrant & Jesse Sanderson & Les Pahl (episode: Riding for a Fall)	Won	
2017	Best Dramatic Series	Tom Cox & Jordy Randall	Nominated	
2017	Best Director (Drama Over 30 Minutes)	Dean Bennett (episode: A Horse with No Rider)	Nominated	
2017	Best Performance by an Alberta Actor	Shaun Johnston (episode: Here and Now)	Nominated	
2017	Best Performance by an Alberta Actress	Amber Marshall (episode: A Horse with No Rider)	Nominated	
2017	Best Screenwriter (Drama Over 30 Minutes)	Mark Haroun (episode: You Just Know)	Nominated	
2017	Best Cinematographer (Drama Over 30 Minutes)	Jarrett Craig (episode: A Horse with No Rider)	Nominated	
2017	Best Overall Sound (Drama Over 30 Minutes)	George Tarrant, Les Paul, Mike Woroniuk & Paul Shubat (episode: A Horse with No Rider)	Nominated	
2017	Best Production Designer/Art Director	Trevor Smith (episode: A Horse with No Rider)	Nominated	
2017	Best Visual Effects	Ken Bitz & Jason Lavoie (episode: Aurora Borealis)	Nominated	

== Young Artist Awards ==
The Young Artist Awards are awarded annually to young actors in film and television. Heartland has one win from four nominations.

Year	Category	Nominee	Result	Reference
2010	Best Performance in a TV Series - Guest Starring Young Actor 14 and Over	Jack Knight	Nominated	
2013	Best Performance in a TV Series (Comedy or Drama) - Supporting Young Actress	Alisha Newton	Won	
2014	Best Performance in a TV Series (Comedy or Drama) - Supporting Young Actress	Alisha Newton	Nominated	
2015	Best Performance in a TV Series - Guest Starring Young Actress 11-13	Julia Lalonde	Nominated	
