= Linda Chapman =

British writer

- Born: January 15, 1969 (age 57); Liverpool, Lancashire, England
- Occupation: Author
- Spouse: 1
- Children: 3
- Writing career
- Pen name: Astrid Foss; Posy Diamond; Tilda Kelly; Rosie Banks; Amber Castle; Alex Cliff; Lucy Daniels; Jenny Dale; Katie Chase; Daisy Meadows; Lauren Brooke
- Years active: 1999-present
- Genres: Children's, fantasy
- Website: lindachapmanauthor.co.uk

Linda Anne Chapman (born 15 January 1969 in Liverpool) is a British writer, principally of series for younger children. She is particularly known for her fantasy books about unicorns, mermaids and magic and has co-authored books with Julie Sykes (Unicorn Academy, Mermaid Academy and Forever Homes), Michelle Misra, Lee Weatherly and Steve Cole. She also writes the Superpowers series as Alex Cliff (her own pseudonym). She has written several of the series books published under the names Lucy Daniels, Jenny Dale, Daisy Meadows (Rainbow Magic), Rosie Banks (Secret Kingdom and Secret Princesses) Katie Chase (Little Princesses), Amber Castle (Spell Sisters), Astrid Foss (Snow Sisters), Tilda Kelly, Posy Diamond and Lauren Brooke, either as part of a collective pseudonym or as a ghostwriter. She has written "about 300" books. She currently lives in a Leicestershire village with her husband and three children.

The Superpowers series features boys and "I wrote it under the name Alex Cliff in case the name Linda Chapman put any boys off."

== Novels ==
- Bright Lights (2003)
- Centre Stage (2004) – sequel to Bright Lights
- Genie Us (with Steve Cole) (2009)
- Genie and the Phoenix (with Steve Cole) (2010)

== Series ==
- My Secret Unicorn
- Stardust
- Not Quite a Mermaid
- Unicorn School
- Genie Us (with Steve Cole)
- Sky Horses
- Skating School
- Loving Spirit
- Sophie and the Shadow Woods (with Lee Weatherly)
- Mr Monkey
- Best Friends Bakery
- Star Friends
- Mermaids Rock
- Moonlight Riders
- Magic Keepers
- A Pony Called Angel
- Hello Kitty's Friendship Club (with Michelle Misra)
- Wild Friends (with Michelle Misra)
- Dinosaur Land (with Michelle Misra)
- Angel Wings (with Michelle Misra)
- Unicorn Academy (with Julie Sykes)
- Mermaid Academy (with Julie Sykes)
- Forever Homes (with Julie Sykes)
- Superpowers

=== As Alex Cliff ===
- Superpowers

=== As Daisy Meadows ===
(with Sue Bentley, Narinder Dhami, and Sue Mongredien)

- Rainbow Magic

=== As Lauren Brooke ===
- Heartland (novel series)

=== As Jenny Dale ===
- Pony Tales

=== As Lucy Daniels ===
- Animal Ark
- Animal Ark Pets
- Little Animal Ark
- The Horseshoe Trilogies

=== As Amber Castle ===
- Spell Sisters

=== As Rosie Banks ===
- Secret Kingdom
- Secret Princesses

=== As Astrid Foss ===
- Snow Sisters

=== As Posy Diamond ===
- Bridesmaids Club
