= Chestnut Hill (novel series) =

Novel series

Chestnut Hill is a novel series created by Lauren Brooke. Chestnut Hill is a spin off series to the Heartland series. The first book in the series, The New Class, was published in August 2005. The series revolves around four girls who live together at a boarding school in Virginia called Chestnut Hill, where they take classes and ride horses at a stable on the campus. Lauren Brooke has said that she went through a lot of preparation for this series, including listing and developing over one hundred names and drawing maps of her new setting. The books have four different perspectives, friends Dylan, Malory, Felicity (Honey) and Lani.

== Connecting series ==
Author Lauren Brooke has created ties between her popular series Heartland and Chestnut Hill. Both series take place in Virginia. Readers that have read the last book in the Heartland series will see a definite connection. Amy, the main character of Heartland, gave a talk in the first novel and helped Malory solve the rusting issue with Tybalt in the second Chestnut Hill book, Making Strides as well.

== The novels ==
1. The New Class (2005)
2. Making Strides (2005)
3. Heart of Gold (2006)
4. Playing for Keeps (2006)
5. The Scheme Team (Team Spirit in the UK) (2006)
6. All Or Nothing (2006)
7. Chasing Dreams (2008)
8. A Time to Remember (2008)
9. Helping Hands (2009)
10. Racing Hearts (2009)
11. A Chance to Shine (2009)
12. Far and Away (2010)

== The characters ==
=== Main characters ===
Dylan Walsh - is friendly, witty and spontaneous, though sometimes sassy. Her aunt, Ali Carmichael, known to the students as Ms. Carmichael, is the Director of Riding at Chestnut Hill. She has wanted to attend Chestnut Hill since fourth grade, and becomes best friends with Honey, Lani, and Malory, while making quick enemies with Lynsey Harrison and Patience Duvall. She shares a room with Lynsey and Honey in books 1–6, and just with Lynsey in book 7 onwards. Dylan's favorite horse is called Morello. He is a piebald gelding owned by her Aunt Ali. Dylan met him when visiting her aunt's ranch in Kentucky and fell in love with him immediately. Dylan was glad to hear that Aunt Ali had brought him to Chestnut Hill with her. Dylan and Morello are noted to be very alike in personality. In the first book, Dylan makes substitute member of the junior jumping team. On a holiday, Dylan meets a cute French boy called Henri and wants him to be her boyfriend in the 4th book. Although she has no serious crushes, she is into romance and gets exited when her friends Malory and Honey start dating.

Malory O'Neil - came to Chestnut Hill on a scholarship after winning the prestigious Rockwell Award, given out by Diane Rockwell, a former student at the school who felt that she had to give the chance at the fabulous school to less wealthy girls. Malory does not pay much attention to fashion, and seems to lack self-confidence at times, but never around horses. She is a shy Irish American girl and finds it difficult to talk about personal issues. She is close friends with Dylan, Honey, and Lani. Malory is an only child. Her mother died a year prior to the first book and her father is a shoe shop owner. Her father is not very wealthy which is a fact Lynsey Harrison reminds her of frequently. Malory met a boy, Caleb Smith, from Saint Christopher's, the neighbouring boys' school, over the summer. They went on a few dates, broke up due to a disagreement about the importance of winning, and then reunited in All or Nothing. She shares rooms with Lani and Alexandra in books 1-6 and just with Alexandra in book 7 onwards. Malory's favorite horse is Tybalt, a gorgeous dark brown Thoroughbred gelding. Malory came across him when she and Dylan went with Ms. Carmichael to purchase some horses. They had only planned to buy Foxy Lady and Winter Wonderland "Winnie", but Malory persuaded Ali to buy Tybalt as well, since he reminded her of the horse she learnt to ride on, Zanzibar. Ali took Tybalt on a short lease for a while and then decided to keep him after Malory and Amy helped him settle down. Soon after he was good enough to become Malory's show horse, and although Lynsey says he is unreliable, he is less nervous and skittish as time goes on.

Felicity "Honey" Harper - Sam's twin sister. Her best friends are Dylan, Lani, and Malory. She is originally from London. Honey is very much like her name, in that she is very sweet and she likes to make everyone happy. A boy, Josh, from Saint Christopher's, the nearby boarding school, seems to like Honey, and she has attended a dance with him. She and Josh are dating in book nine. She shares rooms with Lynsey and Dylan in books 1-6 and with Lani in book 7 onwards. Honey had her own pony in England, called Rocky. However, Honey's favorite horse is a grey Connemara pony mare named Moonlight Minuet "Minnie", named after one of the unicorns in famous fantasy novelist Edward Hunter Duvall's books. Before Minnie, Honey rode a bay gelding named Kingfisher. Minnie is owned by Patience Duvall, but after Patience loses interest in Minnie, her father works out an agreement with Ms. Carmichael to let her use Minnie as a school pony. Later, in Chasing Dreams, Honey finds out that Minnie is for sale, and tries to persuade Patience not to sell her. Patience tries to blackmail Honey, not intending to keep her part of the bargain. When Patience tells Honey that Minnie has been sold, Honey is devastated. Later in the book, Honey discovers that it was Dylan who bought Minnie, since her parents were looking to buy a new show pony. Dylan couldn't bear the thought of having a bond with any horse but Morello, and so persuaded her parents to buy Minnie and draw up a lease agreement between them and Honey's parents saying that Minnie was Honey's to ride and take care of. Honey's the youngest twin.

Lani Hernandez - originally learned to ride Western, and is known to wear chaps instead of jodhpurs or breeches. Her best friends are Malory, Honey, and Dylan. Lani is smart and does well in school, her best subjects being science and math, and knows how to lighten the mood. She is very friendly and is generally a happy and outgoing person. She has a mother and father and three older Mexican American sisters named Marta, Guadeloupe, and Dacil. Lani shows a romantic interest in Sam, whom she met in Heart of Gold and later began a relationship with in A Time to Remember. She shares rooms with Malory and Alexandra in books 1-6 and with Honey in book 7 onwards. Lani's favorite horse is a buckskin gelding called Colorado who happens to share his name with Lani's home state, which is also where he came from. Lani is the best Western rider at Chestnut Hill, which she demonstrates at the charity Rodeo Day. Colorado is quite reluctant and needs his rider to be firm with his or her aids, but is forward and enthusiastic when Lani rides him.

Ali Carmichael - Director of Riding at Chestnut Hill, she has a horse ranch in Kentucky that she left for Chestnut Hill. She is Dylan's aunt and Nat's mom. In "Racing Hearts" Ali begins a relationship with Malory's dad. She is a pleasant person but is firm with the students. She is the replacement for the previous Director of Riding, Elizabeth Mitchell, who decided to leave Chestnut Hill. Many of the students question her ability to measure up to the former riding instructor. Her horse Quince is a silver Thoroughbred who came with her to Chestnut Hill.

Lynsey Harrison - Patience Duvall's best friend. She shares a room with Dylan and Honey in books 1-6 and with just Dylan in book 7. Lynsey has made fast enemies with the four main characters, Dylan, Malory, Honey, and Lani, due to her snobby attitude. Lynsey keeps her blue roan gelding, Bluegrass, at Chestnut Hill. Lynsey is cocky and arrogant and loves being the center of attention. She looks down on those less wealthy than herself. She is on the junior jumping team and field hockey team. She carries a high social status, wears fashionable and expensive clothing. Lynsey's older sisters Sienna and Rachel attended Chestnut Hill prior to her, both of whom were very successful there. Lynsey thinks she has to be as outstanding as they were, and she doesn't mind hurting people to get that reputation.

Patience Duvall - Lynsey Harrison's best friend. She shares a room with Wei Lin Chang and Razina Jackson in books 1-6 and just Wei Lin in book 7 onwards, much to her disappointment. Like Lynsey, Patience is spoiled but less confident and only shows interest in something if Lynsey does, such as horse riding. Having Edward Hunter Duvall, author of a bestselling fantasy book series, as a father adds to her yet another reason to look down upon the less socially-prominent students. Patience has a Connemara named Moonlight Minuet that her father bought for her because he enjoys horse riding. His daughter, however, was irresponsible and schooled Minnie in wet sand, causing her to strain a tendon. After this injury, Patience quickly lost interest in Minnie. She is also enemies with the four main characters after she tattled on Dylan for jumping Morello as a midnight dare set by Lynsey. In Chasing Dreams she decides to switch to playing golf and has a crush on the golf instructor.

Samuel "Sam" Harper - Honey's twin brother. He has had a rather complicated relationship with Lani; she found out about him when helping Honey escape a show to see him in hospital, where he is suffering from Leukaemia. They eventually start to date in A Time to Remember. In Racing Hearts Sam starts school at Saint Christopher's (known as St Kits). Sam's the oldest twin.

Caleb Smith - is a rider from Saint Kits. He met Malory in the summer before The New Class at Cheney Falls Stables. Malory and Caleb get along well until The Scheme Team where they break up due to an argument over how important winning is. After getting back together in All or Nothing they fall into a steady relationship. Caleb owns a grey gelding called Pageant's Pride (a.k.a. Gent).

Joshua "Josh" - is a non rider at Saint Kits. He is Caleb's best friend, and Honey's boyfriend since Playing for Keeps.

Razina Jackson - is a non rider at Chestnut Hill. She is an Adams student and shares a room with Patience and Wei Lin in books 1-6 and it is unknown who she shares a room with in book 7 onwards. Her mother owns an art gallery in New York and is a rather big traveller, going to all sorts of places such as the Norwegian Fjords and Africa.

Wei Lin Chang - is an Asian American girl who is another non rider in Adams at Chestnut Hill. She shares rooms with Patience and Razina in book 1-6 and just Patience in book 7 onwards although Patience isn't very happy about this.

Alexandra Cooper - while smart, is very indecisive. She is an Adams student at Chestnut Hill, and shares a room with Lani and Malory in book 1-6 but just Malory in book 7 onwards.

Kelly and Sarah - are Chestnut Hill's grooms. They are very friendly, and willing to let the students help take care of some of the horses. They care for all the horses very well. Sarah owns a fancy dressage gelding called Mischief Maker.

Nathaniel "Nat" Carmichael - Dylan's cousin and Ali's son. He goes to Saint Kits. Lynsey flirted with him in "The New Class" but stopped in the second book.

Amy Fleming - The main character from "Heartland" is called in to assist Malory with Tybalt's issues around trusting her, managing to avert his sale as a result.

"Heart Of Gold" - When Edward Hunter Duvall buys his daughter Patience a beautiful grey Connemara pony named Moonlight Minuet "Minnie" Honey can't help but fall in love with her. Patience is careless and treats Minnie like a fashion ornament. Honey begins to care for the Connemara pony, but along with getting used to the excitement of the new term, parties and homework, comes another thing to stress and worry about for Honey, the fact that her twin brother Sam, who has been in remission for leukaemia, has been infected again. While Honey struggles to deal with it all, she begins to push her friends away, not even telling them about the fact that she has a twin. Eventually she tells Dylan, Lani and Malory but only after a long time does she tell Lani how sick Sam actually is. The two hatch a plan to stow away from the All Schools League Show in which they're helping the Chestnut Hill team, and head to the hospital where Sam is ill. They manage to get in a heap of trouble, but it is worth it for Honey to see her twin. Malory and Dylan are shocked at what Honey was going through and the four friends end up stronger than ever. Thankfully, also Sam's fever goes down and he has improved.
