= Alisha Newton =

Canadian actress (born 2001)

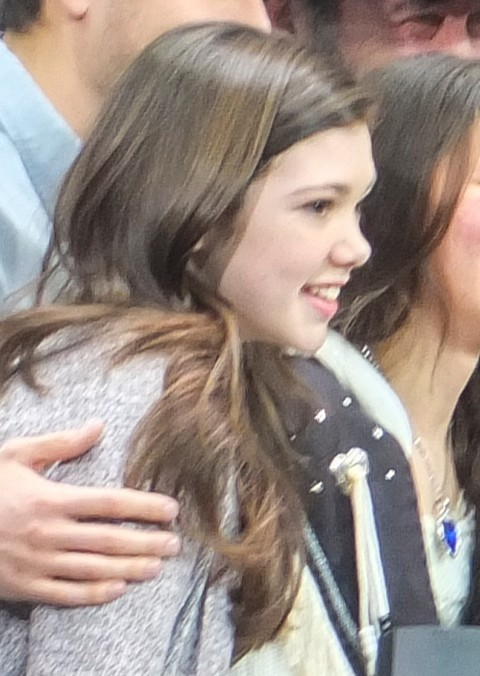
- Newton in 2015
- Born: 22 July 2001 (age 25); Vancouver, British Columbia, Canada
- Occupation: Actress
- Years active: 2010–present

Alisha Newton (born 22 July 2001) is a Canadian actress. She is notable for her main roles as Georgie Fleming Morris on the Canadian television drama series Heartland (2012–2023), and as Helen Mathis in the thriller series Devil in Ohio (2022).

She is also known for her role as Erin in the teen drama series My Life with the Walter Boys, which has been on Netflix since 7 December 2023.

== Life and career ==
Born in Vancouver, Alisha Newton's screen debut at a young age, appearing in a 'Little Mommy' commercial, before her debut acting role in television movie The Wyoming Story in 2010.

Newton played Young Annabeth Chase in the post-2013 release, Twentieth Century Fox's Percy Jackson: Sea of Monsters.

Since 2012, Newton has been a series regular on the CBC drama series Heartland. She portrays Georgie Fleming Morris, a child who finds a nurturing home at Heartland Ranch, owned by Jack Bartlett (Shaun Johnston), who runs the ranch with his granddaughters Amy (Amber Marshall), and her sister Lou (Michelle Morgan). During the early years of filming of Heartland, Newton received on-set schooling.

In 2014, Newton played the minor role of Sofia Dunlap in the 2014 film The Tree That Saved Christmas.

In 2022, she played a main role as Helen, eldest daughter of the Mathis family who takes in the protagonist Mae, in the Netflix thriller series Devil in Ohio.

== Personal life ==
In July 2025, Newton announced that she had become engaged to her boyfriend Trevor.

== Filmography ==
=== Film ===
Year	Title	Role	Notes
2013	Percy Jackson: Sea of Monsters	Young Annabeth	
2013	Heart of Dance	"Jenna"	
2018	Scorched Earth	Beatrice	
2021	We're All in This Together	Paris Parker	

=== Television ===
Year	Title	Role	Notes
2010	The Wyoming Story	Bird Thorpe	Television film
2010	Supernatural	Little Girl	Episode: "Clap Your Hands If You Believe"
2012–2023	Heartland	Georgina 'Georgie' Fleming Morris	Main role (seasons 6–13); Recurring role (seasons 14 and 16)
2014	The Tree That Saved Christmas	Sofia Dunlap	Television film
2015	The Hollow	Emma	Television film
2015	When Calls the Heart	Nellie	Episode: "Heart of the Family"
2018	Til Ex Do Us Part	Emma	Television film
2019	Hudson	Georgie	4 episodes
2021	Debris	Isla Vandeburg	Pilot episode
2022	Devil in Ohio	Helen Mathis	Main role; 8 episodes
2023	My Life with the Walter Boys	Erin Collins	Main role
2023	The More Love Grows	Dana	Television film
2024	Murder in a Small Town	Devon Travis	3 episodes

== Awards and nominations ==
Year	Award	Category	Work	Result	Refs
2013	Young Artist Awards	Best Performance in a Short Film – Young Actress Ten and Under	No Place Like Home	Nominated	
2013	Young Artist Awards	Best Performance in a TV Series (Comedy or Drama) – Supporting Young Actress	Heartland	Won	
2014	Young Artist Awards	Best Performance in a TV Series (Comedy or Drama) – Supporting Young Actress	Heartland	Nominated	
2014	The Joey Awards	Best Young Actress age 14 or younger in a TV Series Drama Supporting/Recurring	Heartland	Won	
2015	The Joey Awards	Best Actress in a TV Drama Leading Role	Heartland	Won	
2016	The Joey Awards	Young Actress in a Drama TV Series Leading Role 14–18 Years	Heartland	Nominated	
