= Xaria Dotson =

American actress

- Born: December 27, 1997 (age 28); Portland, Oregon, U.S.
- Occupation: Actress
- Years active: since 2013

Xaria Dotson is an American actress, known for playing Evie Greyson in the Netflix horror series The Birch and Jules Mathis in the thriller series Devil in Ohio.

== Early life and education ==
Dotson was born in Portland, Oregon. She has two sisters, Zoë and Zamira.

== Career ==
Dotson started off her career appearing in short films. Her first recurring role came playing Tori Carrucchi in the mockumentary series American Vandal She made a one-time appearance in the sitcom Chad.

Her first big role came playing Evie Greyson in the Netflix horror series The Birch. She had a lead role on the thriller series Devil in Ohio where she played Jules Mathis.

== Filmography ==
=== Film ===
Year	Title	Role	Notes
2013	Red Courage	Elizabeth Jensen	short film
2016	Double Oh Awesome	The Terrorists	short film
2019	American Brothers	Girl with Bike	

=== Television ===
Year	Title	Role	Notes
2018	American Vandal	Tori Carucchi	two episodes
2021	Chad	Lisa	episode: "Sword"
2019–2021	The Birch	Evie Grayson	eighteen episodes
2022	Devil in Ohio	Jules	eight episodes

== See also ==
- List of American actors
- List of people from Portland, Oregon
