= Amber Marshall (actress) =

Canadian actress (born 1988)

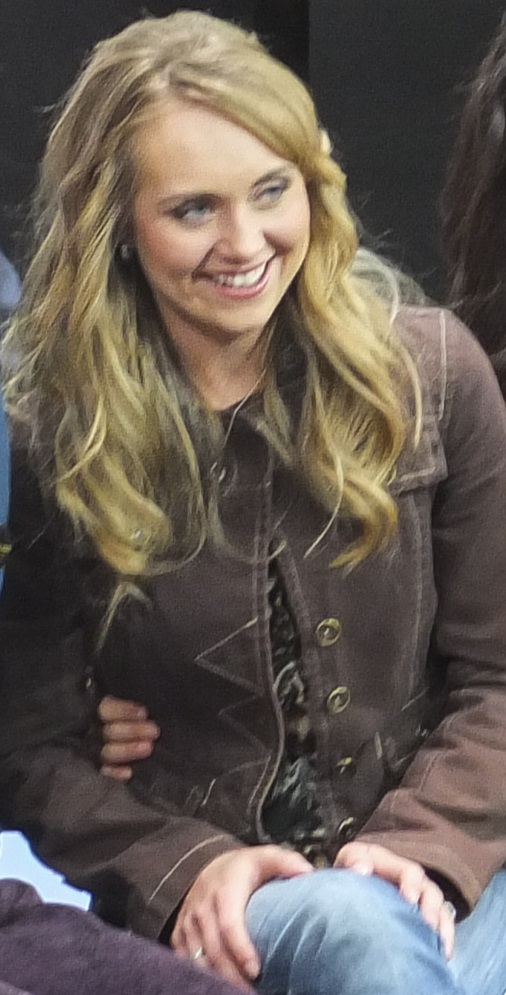
- Marshall at the CBC atrium in 2015
- Born: June 2, 1988 (age 38); London, Ontario, Canada
- Occupation: Actress
- Years active: 2000–present
- Spouse: Shawn Turner (m. 2013)
- Website: www.ambermarshall.com

Amber Marshall (born June 2, 1988) is a Canadian actress most known for portraying the central protagonist Amy Fleming in the long-running CBC Television series Heartland. For her performance in the series, Marshall was voted by public as Canada's Screen Star at the 1st Canadian Screen Awards.

== Early life ==
Marshall was born and raised in London, Ontario. A former veterinary assistant, Marshall has been riding horses since she could walk and says that the two things she loves the most are "acting and horses". However, for Heartland she had to learn Western riding as compared to the English riding she had grown up with.

Marshall attended Lester B. Pearson School for the Arts, starting to act at the early age of 11; growing up, she went to the Original Kids Theatre Company, her experiences at which she credits towards her subsequent success.

== Career ==
Marshall made her acting debut in 2000 in a television series called Super Rupert. The following year, she starred in an episode of Twice in a Lifetime. She next performed in the television series Doc (2002) and Dark Oracle (2004), and in the television film The Christmas Shoes (2002).

In 2003, she was nominated for a Los Angeles-based Young Artist Award for Best Performance in a TV Movie, Miniseries or Special for Leading Young Actress for The Elizabeth Smart Story, a movie-of-the-week based on the true story of the 2002 kidnapping of Utah teenager Elizabeth Smart. A review in People magazine praised Marshall for being effective in the title role.

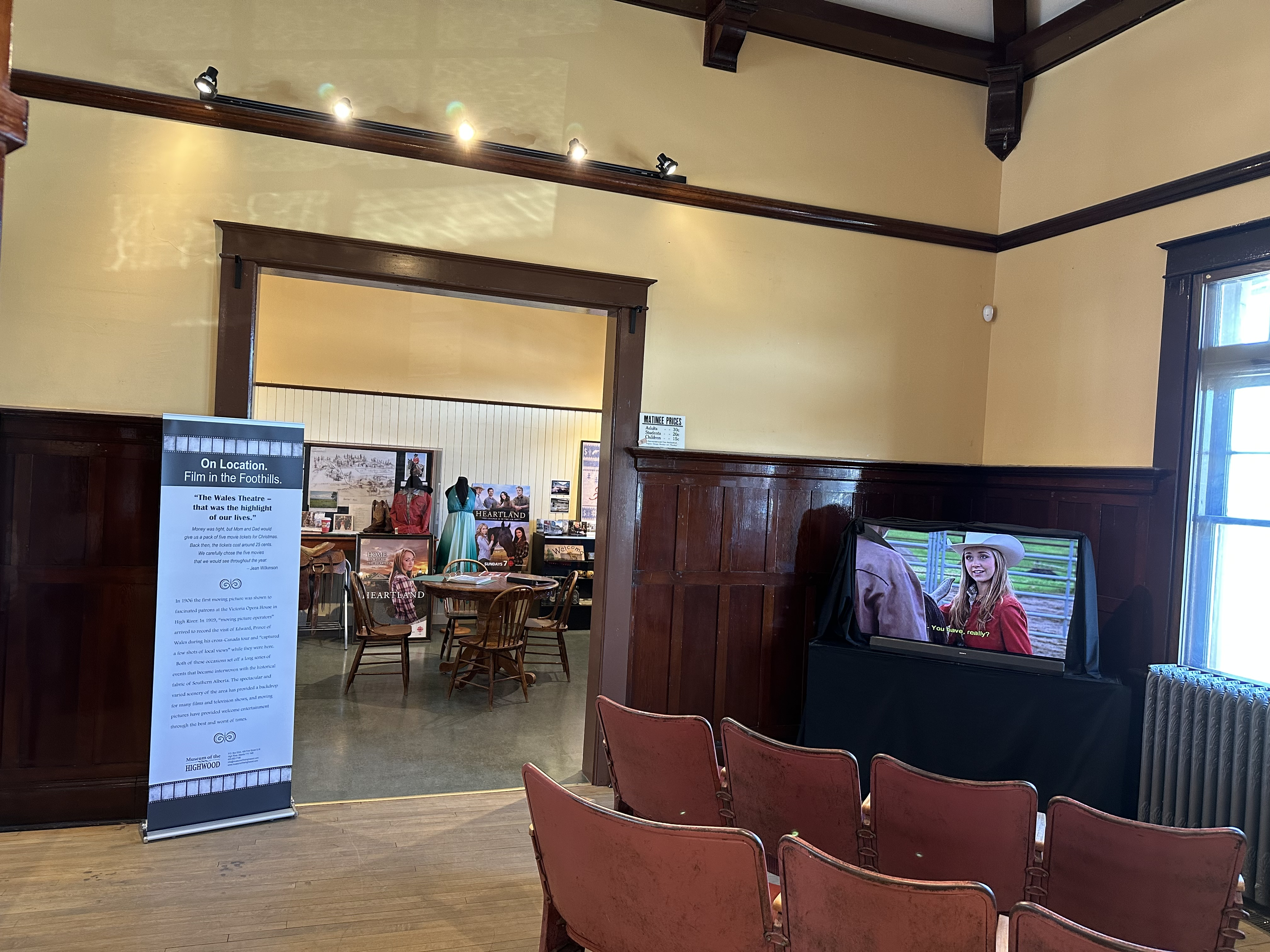
A museum exhibit in High River, Alberta, showcases Heartland and, via posters and episodes, Amber Marshall's role as the top-billed actor on the series

In 2007, Marshall was cast as Amy Fleming in the CBC Television series Heartland. The series is based on the 25-novel series written by Lauren Brooke. The series premiered on Canadian television in October 2007 and originally in syndication in the US on The CW Plus group of stations affiliated with The CW network, and then in 2010, it moved to GMC (now Up TV) and its fifteenth season premiered on May 19, 2022 in the US on Up. At the time the series began, Marshall was 19 years old, portraying Amy Fleming when she was not quite 16. By 2014, Marshall gained an additional credit as a consulting producer for the show.

The series, filmed in High River, Alberta, is about a girl named Amy Fleming living in the fictional town of Hudson, Alberta. Her family owns a horse and cattle ranch called Heartland, where they have a long tradition of healing horses, and the series is focused on the ups and downs of the family, the ranch, and the surrounding community. For her performance in the series, Marshall won the inaugural Canada's Screen Star at the 1st annual Canadian Screen Awards, an award voted on by the viewing public. In 2015, Heartland surpassed Street Legal as the longest-running one-hour scripted drama in the history of Canadian television.

As the top-billed star of Heartland, she has gained a strong following among fans of the show. As such she has presented at the Canadian Country Music Association Awards. By 2015, Marshall had put out a line of jewelry and had also started a magazine, Amber Marshall, Life & Style Magazine. In the early 2020s, she opened Marshall's Country Store in Diamond Valley, Alberta, which was converted from a diner that had closed.

During off-times from filming the series, Marshall has appeared in several other films. In one of them, Love in Harmony Valley (2020), she played the female lead in a romantic drama centered around the effects upon friendships of a serious accident.

== Personal life ==
As of 2016, Marshall lives on a farm ranch outside Calgary, Alberta with her husband Shawn Turner and their animals. Marshall married Shawn, a photographer, on July 27, 2013, after becoming engaged in early 2012.

In between filming seasons of Heartland, Marshall helps out at a local veterinary clinic and spends time with her many animals. She has horses, cows, chickens, ducks, dogs, cats, and rabbits. She had an alpaca, at one time, as well. She has also volunteered at a Wildlife Rehabilitation Centre where she took raptor classes, to work with falcons and hawks.

== Filmography ==
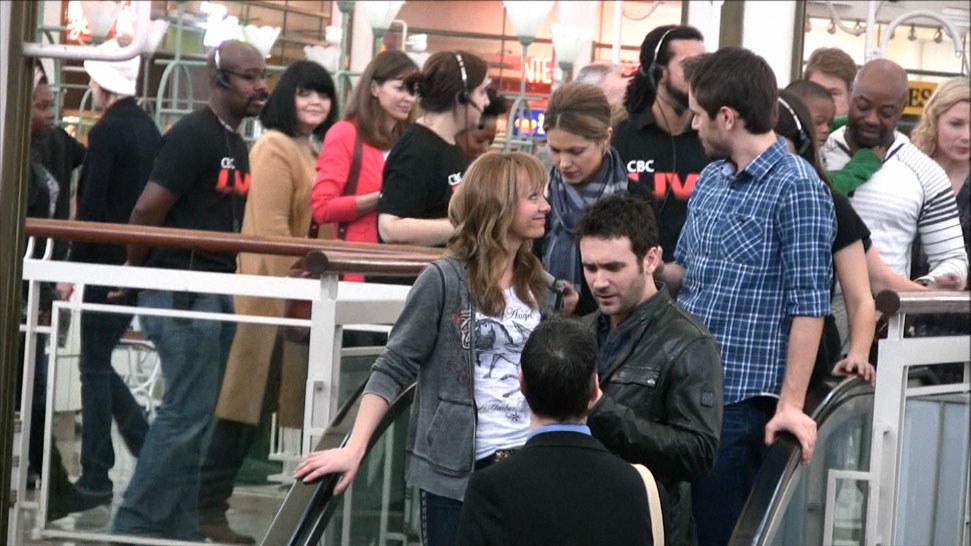
Marshall with Heartland co-star Graham Wardle at a CBC event in 2013

Film and television
Year	Title	Role	Notes
2001	Super Rupert	Ally	Episodes: Making the Grade
2001	Twice in a Lifetime	Renetta Moore	Episode: "Daddy's Girl"
2002	Monk	Lemonade Girl	Episode: "Mr. Monk Meets Dale the Whale"
2002	The Christmas Shoes	Lily Layton	TV movie
2002	Doc	Lauren	Episode: "Karate Kid"
2003	The Elizabeth Smart Story	Elizabeth Smart	TV movie
2004	Resident Evil: Apocalypse	Daughter	
2004	Dark Oracle	Rebecca	Episode: "It Happened at the Dance"
2005	The Power Strikers	Tracey Battle	TV series
2007–present	Heartland	Amy Fleming	Main role
2010	A Heartland Christmas	Amy Fleming	TV movie
2011	Travel Plans	Girl	Short
2014	Mutant World	Nicole	
2019	The Good Americans	Herself	Documentary
2020	With Nothing But Our Courage	Mary McDonald	
2020	Love in Harmony Valley	Emma	TV movie
2023	My Christmas Guide	Peyton Lewis	TV movie
2026	Murdoch Mysteries	Annie Oakley	Episode: "Devil in the Saddle"

== Awards and nominations ==
Year	Award	Category	Work	Result	Ref.
2004	25th Young Artist Awards	Best Performance in a TV Movie, Miniseries or Special – Leading Young Actress	The Elizabeth Smart Story	Nominated	
2013	Canadian Screen Awards	Canada's Screen Star	Heartland	Won	
2016	Rosie Awards	Best Performance by an Alberta Actress	Heartland	Nominated	
2017	Rosie Awards	Best Performance by an Alberta Actress	Heartland	Nominated	
