= A Bluegrass Christmas =

- Directed by: Marco Deufemia
- Written by: Chris Dowling
- Starring: Shaun Johnston; Amanda Jordan; David Pinard; Chelsea Green
- Release date: November 22, 2024
- Running time: 85 minutes
- Country: United States
- Language: English

A Bluegrass Christmas is an American Christmas film, which was released in November 2024. The film follows a struggling horse sanctuary, which must resolve its financial issues to continue operating.

The film stars Shaun Johnston, WWE wrestler Chelsea Green, and Amanda Jordan. It is also available to watch on numerous streaming services, including Amazon Prime Video.

== Plot ==
A Kentucky horse sanctuary receives news that its biggest donor is withdrawing financial support for the sanctuary. Katie Pendleton races against time to raise funds to save her family's sanctuary, with the help of attorney Grant Breckenridge, the donor's son. Bluegrass legend Ben Pendleton could host a benefit concert to raise the money, but refuses to be involved.

Katie and Grant must find a way to raise the money to save the horse sanctuary. If the benefit concert were to go ahead, it would resolve all their financial worries.

== Cast ==
- Amanda Jordan as Katie Pendleton
- David Pinard as Grant Breckenridge
- Shaun Johnston as Ben Pendleton
- Chelsea Green as Claire Crosby
- Rick Amsbury as Don Pendleton
- Stephanie Moore as Sarah Pendleton
- Mike Shara as Jim Breckenridge
- John Tench as Billy Ribbons
- Rowan Hildebrand as Lil' Mikey

== Release ==
A Bluegrass Christmas' official trailer was released in fall 2024. It aired on December 1, 2024, on the INSP network. The film was made available for digital streaming in 2024, and notably part of UPtv's Christmas film lineup.

== Reception ==
A review by The Dove Foundation stated that it was "a wonderful film" and gave the film a positive review.
