= Unicorn School =

Series of children's books by Linda Chapman

Unicorn School is a series of chapter books written by Linda Chapman and published by Puffin between 2007 and 2009. The series is about a Unicorn boarding school in a fictional land called Arcadia. The Unicorns in Arcadia go to school at nine years of age. When they leave school at 15 years of age, the best ones become the Guardians of Arcadia. The series revolves around a Unicorn named Willow. All of the books currently written in the series take place in her first year.

== Books in the series ==
There are currently six books in the series:

- First-Class Friends
- The Surprise Party
- The Treasure Hunt
- The School Play
- The Pet Show
- Team Magic

== Main characters ==
=== Willow ===
- Willow is a first year unicorn and the main character in the series. She is in the Rainbow House, one of four houses that the unicorns are placed in at the beginning of their first year. She is small for her age, something that often triggers teasing from her two older brothers and some of her classmates. She is one of the best students in the school, if not the very best. She is very energetic and friendly, despite the fact that she was homesick at first. She loves to help out her best friends Storm, Sapphire, and Troy. She (revealed in book 5,) has a Hummingbird which she loves, called Whizzy. Willow isn't just helpful to her friends, but to all creatures, seeing that she wants to be a guardian of Arcadia someday. In book 3, Willow and her friends were on a treasure hunt when Willow found a hurt dragon. Troy, being a bad sport, told her, Storm, and Sapphire, that his parents would go looking for him and help him later, but Willow saw that the poor dragon needed help. He had lost his puff! Troy went ahead in the hunt, and Willow and her friends decided to help the dragon. Although she can be helpful, she can get upset easily. Like in book 4, Willow and Sapphire competed together to get the main part of Sleeping Beauty, and Sapphire got it. Willow got the Wicked Witch's part and she didn't realize how lucky she was or how fun it was until showtime.

=== Sapphire ===
- Sapphire is a first year unicorn in the Rainbow House and one of the first unicorns that Willow meets. She is very shy but extremely friendly, often doing things that she doesn't feel comfortable with in order to please her friends. She is also prone to homesickness because she misses her six siblings (two older, four younger) although she never mentions their names. Sapphire has a long mane and tail, she's one of the prettiest unicorns in the school. In book 4, Sapphire was picked to be the main part, in the play Sleeping Beauty.

=== Storm ===
- Storm is a first year unicorn in the Rainbow House and one of the first unicorns that Willow meets. He is so big, that when Willow first saw him, she mistook him for a third year. He is very strong, but his size gives him trouble with flying at first, although he improves by the end of First-Class Friends. He is also gullible, even accepting a cursed horseshoe from Oriel in order to improve his flying. It is revealed that he is an only child and can't imagine what it would be like to have six siblings like Sapphire. He seems to be closer to Willow than anyone else.

=== Troy ===
- Troy is a first year unicorn in the Rainbow House and one of the first unicorns that Willow meets. He tries hard to be normal, but it is revealed in The Surprise Party that he is the prince of Arcadia and word of this quickly gets around school. He is a bad sport, often trying to hard to win school competitions and resorts to complaining if he loses anything. He is an expert flyer, apparently having practiced at home, and likes to brag about it. He is the only Year 1 to compete in the flying races, and he (revealed in book 5,) has a black mountain panther. Despite his many faults, Troy proves himself to be a loyal friend to Willow, Sapphire and Storm.

== Minor characters ==
=== Oriel ===
- Oriel is a third-year unicorn in the Rainbow House. He is described at first as being a bully, especially when he picks on Willow and Storm because of their sizes. But his attitude toward the other students changes at the end of First-Class Friends, when he needs to apologize to Atlas (see below) about giving Storm a cursed horseshoe, saying that it was charmed instead.

=== Tricorn ===
- The Tricorn is the head of the boarding school. He is easily recognizable because his horn is gold, silver and bronze, whereas most unicorns horns are only one of these colors. He determines which houses the first years will be placed in at the beginning of the school year and announces important events.

=== Atlas ===
- Atlas is the head of the Rainbow house and the flying teacher for the first years. He is very strict, especially when it comes to students being on time for their lessons, but is otherwise a fair teacher.

== See also ==
- My Secret Unicorn
