= My Secret Unicorn =

Children's book series by Linda Chapman

My Secret Unicorn is a series of children's books written by Linda Chapman. The series was first published between 2002 and 2007. The books feature the adventures of Lauren and her unicorn, Twilight, and their friends. Chapman got the inspiration for the series while nannying for a pony-mad seven-year-old in 1994, and in 1998 started writing for Working Partners Ltd. Since then she has had over a hundred books published (many internationally) under various pseudonyms and under her own name.

The books concern a nine-year-old girl named Lauren and her pony Twilight. Only Michael (from A Special Friend), Rosie (from Starry Skies), Grace (from Rising Star ) and an old lady named Mrs. Fontana know that he really is a magical unicorn.

== The titles ==
The My Secret Unicorn books, in chronological order, are:

Book 1: The Magic Spell: Lauren Foster buys a scruffy grey pony, but thinks there is something special about him.

Book 2: Dreams Come True: Lauren meets a new friend, Melanie, but faces a problem when Mel's horse refuses to jump.

Book 3: Flying High: Lauren and Twilight, her unicorn, must try to help unhappy Jessica.

Book 4: Starlight Surprise: A spooky treehouse scares everybody but Lauren thinks it may not be haunted.

Book 5: Stronger Than Magic: Twilight falls ill and begins to lose his magic powers.

Book 6: A Special Friend: Lauren meets a lonely boy named Michael, and believes he may be a good unicorn friend for an unwanted unicorn called Moonshine.

Book 7: A Winter Wish: Lauren's two friends from the city come to stay, but things do not go quite as planned.

Book 8: A Touch of Magic: Lauren's little brother, Max, begins to neglect his dog, Buddy, to the extent that Buddy runs away.

Book 9: Snowy Dreams: Lauren suspects Twilight is keeping a secret from her, but how can she find out what it is?

Book 10: Twilight Magic: A baby unicorn is discovered by Lauren and Twilight.

Book 11: Friends Forever: Lauren is excited to go to camp, but things go horribly wrong when Lauren and Mel's friendship falls apart.

Book 12: Rising Star: The baby unicorn worries he will never fly.

Book 13: Moonlight Journey: When Mel's horse, Shadow, falls sick, Lauren and Twilight must make the hazardous journey to help him.

Book 14: Keeper of Magic: Lauren is upset as a relative refuses to ride, and Mrs. Fontana reveals a secret.

Book 15: Starry Skies: Lauren's new role as Keeper of Secrets hangs over her as she deals with a particularly hard problem.

Some of the other 2 in 1 books are:

- A magic spell and Dream come true
- Flying high and Starlight surprise
- A touch of magic and Snowy dreams
- Stronger than magic and A special friend
- Twilight magic and Friends forever

== See also ==
- Unicorn School
