= Devil in Ohio =

American suspense thriller television series

- Netflix poster
- Genre: Suspense thriller
- Created by: Daria Polatin
- Based on: Devil in Ohio by Daria Polatin
- Starring: Emily Deschanel; Sam Jaeger; Gerardo Celasco; Madeleine Arthur; Xaria Dotson; Alisha Newton; Naomi Tan
- Theme music composer: Bishop Briggs; Will Bates
- Composer: Will Bates
- Country of origin: United States
- Original language: English
- No. of episodes: 8

Production
- Executive producers: Daria Polatin; Rachel Miller; Andrew Wilder
- Producer: Ian Hay
- Production location: Vancouver
- Cinematography: Corey Robson
- Editors: Andrew Cohen; Erin Deck; Jamie Alain
- Running time: 40–49 minutes
- Production companies: 1001 Pictures; Haven

Original release
- Network: Netflix
- Release: September 2, 2022

Devil in Ohio is an American suspense thriller television limited series created by Daria Polatin based on Polatin's book of the same name for Netflix. The series consists of eight episodes and was released on September 2, 2022.

== Plot summary ==
Mae, a teenager with an inverted pentagram carved into her back, shows up in an Ohio hospital. Her case sparks the interest of hospital psychiatrist Dr. Suzanne Mathis, who offers to put the girl up in her home while looking for a suitable foster family. It's soon discovered that Mae escaped a devil-worshipping cult in the rural neighboring county. Authorities have long tried to investigate the cult, but they have been blocked by religious freedom issues and a fiercely protective county sheriff. It's not long before Mae's presence causes upheaval in the Mathis family.

== Cast and characters ==
=== Main ===
- Emily Deschanel as Dr. Suzanne Mathis, a hospital psychiatrist
- Sam Jaeger as Peter Mathis, Suzanne's husband who is a real estate developer
- Gerardo Celasco as Detective Lopez, a detective who is investigating Mae's case
- Madeleine Arthur as Mae Dodd, a levelheaded and stoic teen whose identity is mysterious
- Xaria Dotson as Jules Mathis, Suzanne and Peter's fifteen-year-old daughter
- Alisha Newton as Helen Mathis, Suzanne's and Peter's oldest daughter who is a high school senior
- Naomi Tan as Dani Mathis, Suzanne's and Peter's youngest daughter

=== Recurring ===
- Marci T. House as Adele Thornton
- Bradley Stryker as Sheriff Wilkins
- Jason Sakaki as Isaac Kimura
- Evan Ellison as Sebastian Zelle
- Ty Wood as Teddy Harrington
- Cynthia Khalifeh as Rasha Shams
- Djouliet Amara as Tatiana Nelson
- Tahmoh Penikett as Malachi
- Eva Bourne as Gina Brooks
- Keenan Tracey as Noah
- Samantha Ferris as Rhoda Morrison.

== Episodes ==
No.	Title	Directed by	Teleplay by	Original release date
1	"Broken Fall"	John Fawcett	Daria Polatin	September 2, 2022
Dr. Suzanne Mathis, an in-patient psychiatrist at the local hospital, is introduced to a young, unidentified girl who was brought into the hospital the night before with a severe stab wound in her back. Thus far, the girl has provided the staff with no information about herself or the incident that led to her hospitalization. Once the girl is more stable, she is taken to a different room in the hospital for a blood draw, but she becomes aggressive after seeing the needle. Suzanne calms her down, and the two bond. Meanwhile, the Mathis family begins to have troubles at home. The middle daughter Jules begins to fight with her older sister Helen because Helen refuses to help Jules out socially, now that both attend high school together. Suzanne's husband Peter has spent the last two years constructing a home for a friend through his property management company, Mathis Development, and has taken out loans to complete the home. However, the friend backs out of the deal on the day he was supposed to finish signing the paperwork to purchase the home. Peter starts to tell Suzanne about the house, but decides not to. At the hospital, Suzanne sees a local sheriff who is looking for the girl. She tells him she cannot tell him anything without a court order, and he leaves. After the girl spends three days in the hospital, she must be transferred to a different hospital due to bed space and a lack of grounds to continue to hold her. While pleading with the social worker to continue to hold the girl or put her in foster care, the social worker informs Suzanne that she has already contacted every emergency foster parent except for Suzanne. The girl tells Suzanne that her real name is Mae, and Suzanne decides to bring her home as an emergency foster placement. The family's youngest daughter and former foster child Dani is excited to have Mae in the home, but Helen and Jules are not pleased with the arrangement. Before the family eats dinner that night, Mae asks about the blessing. She is told that, while they don't pray, she is welcome to. She then proceeds to pray to the Morningstar, "the ruler of demons". The family looks confused and shocked but, before too much is said, the father changes the subject. As that scene closes, the camera pulls out of one the windows to reveal a large black bird looking at the house. Meanwhile a detective arrives at the hospital searching for "the girl with cuts on her back". The sheriff who previously went to the hospital is seen with an upside-down cross in his trailer. Suzanne wishes Mae goodnight, and then once she is alone, Mae inspects a pentagram carved into her back. The scene closes with Mae smirking and saying to herself, quietly "You deserve it".
2	"Sanctuary"	John Fawcett	Daria Polatin	September 2, 2022
In a flashback, a young girl is packing toys then escaping out of a bedroom window at night. A sheriff car comes along and releases a German shepherd to track her down as she runs through a grove. Back in the present, the Mathis family is making breakfast when a crow smashes into the kitchen window. Peter puts the injured bird in a box to take to a sanctuary, but Mae says it won’t live. Suzanne brings Mae to see her colleague Jerry who performs educational testing for foster care placement. Meanwhile Peter goes to a deserted bird sanctuary where a murder of crows ominously fly around. Peter leaves with the bird. At work, Suzanne dismisses nurse Adele’s warnings of the strange rumors about Amon County. Detective Alex Lopez finds Suzanne and asks to interview Mae. At school, Sebastian is impressed with Jules’ photo essay ideas for the school paper. Facing foreclosure, Peter goes to the bank to ask for a time extension on his mortgage payments. Suzanne hears a foster home placement has been secured for Mae. Jerry reports Mae had been home-schooled and performed well on math and reading tests. Mae told Jerry she had helped her brother with accounting on a farm but was reluctant to give him details. That evening, Mae watches Jules photograph objects for her photo essay. The next morning, Jules finds a spooky corn husk doll on her nightstand, a gift from Mae. Suzanne persuades a reluctant Jules to include the doll in her photo essay. Detective Lopez pursues the Mae Dodd case and drives out to rural route marker 67 where Mae was first found. He finds a bloody knife and spots a bare footprint. He explores the nearby cornfield where he comes upon a rotting pig’s head mounted on a scarecrow’s body with a strange symbol on it. Suzanne and Mae visit the foster home which is crowded with happy young foster kids. In a hallway, Mae hisses at two young boys which scares them off. Mae is disturbed by a white Christian cross on the wall. As she leaves, the cross is shown hanging upside down. Suzanne and Mae stop at a store, but Suzanne panics when Mae disappears. She finds her sitting outside, then Mae tells her she has run away before. Mae confesses that she cannot stay in the foster home because there is no place to hide there. Quickly we see the flashback again of the girl being chased by the search dog. Mae tells Suzanne she feels safe with her. At work, Suzanne asks her supervisor Rhoda to allow Mae to continue living at her home. Lopez returns to his car and finds Sheriff Wilkins and his German shepherd waiting there. Lopez asks to meet Mae’s family but Wilkins says he will interview them for him. At home, Peter hears back from the bank that he has six more weeks grace period on his payments. Jules is horrified when she spies her mother treating Mae’s pentagram wound. Back to the flashback where the young girl runs up a tree and the sheriff says “you have to come down sometime, Suzanne”. Suzanne sings Jules a lullaby while Peter digs a grave for the dead crow in their yard. He goes to retrieve the bird’s body from the box, but finds it empty. Flash to Mae walking in a dark grove carrying the dead crow in her hands. She carves the strange symbol (seen earlier on the scarecrow) into the bark of a rotting tree trunk then places the crow inside it. She whispers “thank you”.
3	"Mother's Keeper"	Brad Anderson	Daria Polatin	September 2, 2022
As Suzanne leaves work, we see that her car has been marked. A judge grants Suzanne custody of Mae, after her parents fail to appear in court. Detective Lopez tells Suzanne the blood on the knife found outside the cornfield matches the blood on Mae’s nightgown and that both Mae’s prints and an unidentified individual were on the knife. In a flashback, we see Mae living with numerous other girls in one room and that Mae has been designated “the chosen one.” As ordered by the judge, Suzanne enrolls Mae in Helen & Jules’ school. Later, Mae notices the mark on Suzanne’s car and washes it off. Mae starts school and seems to bond with Jules. Suzanne tries to find out more information on Amon County and the pentagram. She drives to Amon County and leaves a note for Abigail, Mae’s mother, in the mailbox but is met with hostility when inquiring about the family’s home and is turned away. Mae is seen making a sacrificial nest of sorts with various items from the Mathis’ home. Detective Lopez tells Suzanne he believes Mae’s family is part of a cult. Suzanne finds the note she left for Abigail in her mailbox. In a flashback, we see Mae being prepared for a ceremony. Mae’s mother gives her a crown made of crow feathers and encourages her to do what they say. The ritual takes place. Disturbed from these memories, Mae takes a knife from the kitchen and cuts up the meat Peter brought home from hunting.
4	"Rely-upon"	Brad Anderson	Kathleen Hale	September 2, 2022
In a dream, Suzanne frantically searches for a Mae in a cornfield but wakes up suddenly. Detective Lopez does surveillance on the warehouse Suzanne visited [in the previous episode]. A van leaves the warehouse and he follows it to the cult’s compound (Amontown) deep in the woods. Suzanne visits a professor who knows a bit of history of Amontown. To the best of her knowledge, Mae is the only one who has escaped the cult and warns Suzanne about Mae’s potential disposition to hidden triggers due to her upbringing. Peter discloses the troubles he’s been having at work with Suzanne. Suzanne asks Mae if she knows whether or not anyone has ever left Amontown. Mae tells her a boy named Enoch tried to leave but Lucifer punished him by “striking him down” and that he is dead. Suzanne informs Detective Lopez about Enoch. Peter holds an open house with Cheryl. Suzanne finds out that Jules posted the photo of Mae (and her scar) online for the school newspaper and demands it be taken down. An anonymous donor pays for the karaoke room for Dani’s birthday party. Detective Lopez discovers that the Dodd family, along with the help of their lawyer William Untermeyer, own all the land in Amon County. All 5 farms in Amon County make a pentagram like the one on Mae’s back. Detective Lopez deduces that Mae is the daughter of Amontown’s leader. Mae has a breakdown in the rain and tells Jules that she is special and that she “cannot break the chain.” As Jules leads her back inside, a man in a white van watches them from the street.
5	"Alight"	Leslie Hope	Andrew Wilder	September 2, 2022
In Autumn 1922 in West Virginia, a man is burying a small body. A crow lands nearby and seems to communicate with the man who then walks off. In the next scene, a book called the Book of Covenants is closed which signifies the origins of Amontown. Jules tells Suzanne about finding Mae outside in the rain. Cheryl calls Peter to tell him someone has made an offer on his property. Suzanne finds Mae in the backyard with her sacrificial nest. Mae tells Suzanne that what she is doing is for wishes and that she wishes to stay with the Mathis family. She tells Suzanne that the Dodd family ancestors endured great suffering and through a crow, Caleb was shown how to help his people prosper through Lucifer. All followed him except for a woman named Mary who made herself a willing offering by binding her life to Lucifer’s, also making herself the first link in the chain. Mae shares that plagues are happening again in Amontown and that she was supposed to be the offering; another link in the chain, which is why she left. Suzanne shares this information with Detective Lopez. Jules and Isaac grow further apart. Cheryl offers to buy Peter’s property for a lower price than he was expecting so he tries to get an extension on the loan but is denied. Detective Lopez sets up cameras in the woods near the Amontown compound and puts a tracking device on Sheriff Wilkins’ car. Jules asks her crush, Sebastian, to the Fall Dance only to find out that he has already asked Mae but she meets an older boy while getting more beer. Detective Lopez witnesses a ritual performed by the people of Amontown and takes pictures for proof. Jules confronts Mae about Sebastian at the party. Someone calls the cops and everyone leaves the party. Abandoned by her friends at Trick or Treat, Dani has a reaction to candy she has eaten and can’t reach her Epipen in time. When Helen arrives home, she takes Dani to the E.R. Peter gets a phone call and arrives to find his property engulfed in flames. The boy Jules met earlier offers to take her home from the party but doesn’t listen to her directions and since her phone is dead, she can’t call for help.
6	"My Love and I"	Leslie Hope	Joy Gregory	September 2, 2022
Alex makes a key connection after the fire. Painful memories surface for Suzanne. A fearful Mae tries to stop Jules from going on a date.
7	"By Blood"	Steven A. Adelson	Aaron Carter & Lorelei Ignas	September 2, 2022
Mae is seen at her sacrificial nest in the backyard wishing to stay with the Mathis family. However, Suzanne makes arrangements for Mae to attend a facility for kids with troubled backgrounds in Vermont. Helen breaks up with her boyfriend, Teddy. Peter takes a job managing an apartment complex. Suzanne meets with Detective Lopez and they connect the priest, James Dressler, to the poppy farm fire and full moon, mentioned by Mae, deducing that he may be Enoch. Helen and Jules reconnect as they get ready for the dance. Helen's ex, Teddy shows up to escort Mae to the dance, who is wearing Suzanne's dress from high school. Peter is called in and questioned regarding the fire at his property. Suzanne and Detective Lopez visit James who confirms that he is Enoch and escaped from Amontown. When Mae shows up to the dance, she reveals her scar to the whole school and they all cheer and support her. Enoch explains how the night of the fire, he was mistaken for James, who died, and saw it as a way to escape Amontown for good. Enoch reveals that like Mary before her, Mae was marked to be burned alive as a sacrifice in a ritual that will take place that night. Mae wins Harvest Queen but is triggered by the white rose bouquet she receives and runs out of the school. Suzanne rushes to the school to try to protect Mae but is run off the road by another vehicle. At the station, Detective Lopez guesses that the fire started at Peter's property was ignited with an animal base accelerant and his suspicions are confirmed by the investigator. Peter is let go but both Peter and Detective Lopez realize that Mae's people are behind the fire and have friends in high places. Mae is missing so Suzanne goes to look for her. Meanwhile, Mae's father has started the ritual.
8	"The Dawning"	Steven A. Adelson	Daria Polatin & Andrew Wilder	September 2, 2022
Mae returns home and prepares to be sacrificed. Detective Lopez is told to drop the Amontown case. Suzanne sneaks into the Amontown compound as the sacrificial ceremony begins. Sheriff Wilkins finds Suzanne sneaking around and they fight but she gets away as a fire starts outside the church. Before Mae is sacrificed, the members are alerted to the fire and halt the ritual in order to save the church. Meanwhile, Peter, Helen, Jules and Dani spend the night at one of Peter's apartments as their front door was marked by members of the Amontown cult. Suzanne climbs the wooden platform in an attempt to save Mae from Abigail but the platform is set on fire by Noah. Mae and Suzanne jump to safety but have to fight Noah who still wants Mae to be sacrificed. Mae knocks Noah out. Abigail sacrifices herself in Mae’s place so the chain will not be broken. Detective Lopez shoots Sheriff Wilkins. Suzanne and Mae are safe. Suzanne goes back to therapy after taking time off from work to focus on herself and her family. Detective Lopez is promoted to lieutenant and obtains a search warrant for the Amon County properties. However, when they arrive, Amontown is completely deserted except for Sheriff Wilkins' dog. The Mathis family has separated; Mae is living with Suzanne at the house and Helen, Dani and Jules are living with Peter at the apartment. When Suzanne visits to drop off a dessert for Thanksgiving, she tells Peter she isn't giving up on them, but Peter is angry she has brought Mae to the house after agreeing she would be allowed nowhere near the girls. He tells Suzanne the issue was never about Mae, implying it was Suzanne putting her work and charge before her family. Detective Lopez calls Suzanne as she and Mae prepare to sit down for Thanksgiving and tells her that Teddy’s SUV has been found abandoned in the woods outside of Amontown after reporting it stolen. Security footage also shows Mae hiding a bouquet of white roses behind the school the night of the dance, allowing her the pretence of being triggered to return to Amontown. Detective Lopez tells Suzanne he believes Mae had planned the entire sacrificial event to trick Suzanne into running to save her. A horrified Suzanne realises she really doesn't know Mae at all; Mae has gone to many lengths not to be separated from Suzanne, and has shown she will do anything to have her for herself. As Suzanne gazes at her and sees her in a new light, Mae – gratified at achieving exactly what she wanted – tells Suzanne to sit and eat, saying "we deserve this". As the camera moved away from the property, a much larger shrine is seen with a picture of Suzanne and Peter in the centre, Peter overlapped by a picture of Mae.

== Production ==
=== Development ===
On September 15, 2021, it was announced that Netflix gave an eight-episode series order to Devil in Ohio, a limited series based on Daria Polatin's novel. Polatin, Rachel Miller, and Andrew Wilder are executive producers, and Ian Hay serves as producer. Polatin also serves as showrunner. The limited series premiered on September 2, 2022.

=== Casting ===
Alongside the series announcement, Emily Deschanel, Sam Jaeger, Gerardo Celasco, Madeleine Arthur, Xaria Dotson, Alisha Newton, and Naomi Tan were cast. Djouliet Amara, Jason Sakaki, Marci T. House, Samantha Ferris, Bradley Stryker, Evan Ellison, Ty Wood, Stacey Farber, Tahmoh Penikett, and Keenan Tracey were cast in October 2021.

=== Filming ===
Filming began on September 8, 2021, in Vancouver, Canada, and wrapped on December 13, 2021.

== Reception ==
The review aggregator website Rotten Tomatoes reported a 50% approval rating with an average rating of 5.3/10, based on 12 critic reviews. The website's critics consensus reads, "Devil in Ohio may provide some lurid kicks for viewers in the mood for satanic suds, but this thriller's biggest sin is squandering a hellish hook with blasé execution." Metacritic, which uses a weighted average, assigned a score of 56 out of 100 based on 4 critics, indicating "mixed or average reviews".
