= Heartland (Canadian TV series) =

Canadian family drama television series

- Genre: Family drama
- Based on: Heartland series by Lauren Brooke
- Developed by: Murray Shostak
- Starring: Amber Marshall; Michelle Morgan; Shaun Johnston; Chris Potter
- Opening theme: "Dreamer" by Jenn Grant
- Country of origin: Canada
- Original language: English
- No. of seasons: 20
- No. of episodes: 286 (list of episodes)

Production
- Executive producers: Heather Conkie; Tom Cox; Jordy Randall; Michael Weinberg
- Producers: Suzan Aynscough; Tina Grewal; Jamie Paul Rock; Dean Bennett
- Running time: 44 minutes
- Production companies: SEVEN24 Films; Dynamo Films; CBC

Original release
- Network: CBC
- Release: October 14, 2007 – present

Heartland is a Canadian family drama television series which debuted on CBC Television in 2007 and continues to air both there and in other countries via syndication and streaming services. The series is based on the Heartland book series by Lauren Brooke. It follows Amy Fleming and her older sister "Lou" Fleming on their family horse and cattle ranch, Heartland, in Alberta, where they live with their initially-widower grandfather Jack Bartlett, their once-estranged father Tim Fleming, and hired farmhand Ty Borden. While dealing with the highs and lows of life on the ranch, the family bonds and grows closer. The show stars Amber Marshall, Michelle Morgan, and Shaun Johnston, with many others appearing in its large ensemble cast over the years.

With the airing of its 125th episode on October 19, 2014, Heartland surpassed Street Legal as the longest-running one-hour scripted drama in Canadian television history.

On June 1, 2022, CBC renewed the series for a 15-episode sixteenth season, premiered in Canada on October 2, 2022. In May 2023, the series was renewed for a 10-episode seventeenth season, which premiered in Canada on October 1, 2023.

In May 2024, the series was renewed for an eighteenth season, which immediately began filming thereafter. It premiered in Canada in the fall of 2024, and the United States later in 2025. The decision to continue on with the series was announced by the CBC so that the family drama Heartland will be renewed for a 19th season. Filming began for this in May 2025. On May 26, 2026, the series was renewed for a twentieth season. According to a post on Amber Marshall's Facebook page, the 20th season wrapped principal photography in early September 2026.

In the United States, the series has wide distribution through broadcast syndication on weekends, including as part of the default national schedule for Up TV and The CW Plus and new episodes become available as of 2021, on Up Faith & Family, the network's streaming service months after full seasons finish their runs in Canada and later premiere in the United States linearly on the main network and all later seasons are exclusive to Up Faith & family first before they are available for syndication on other American networks and streaming services unaffiliated with UP tv or its sister networks. Reruns of older episodes also air on Hulu, Pluto TV, formerly on the now-defunct service Crackle, Tubi, BYUtv, Retro TV, COZI TV, Ace TV, and Heartland (a coincidental brand unrelated to the show itself). It was also part of the schedule on Light TV until it was rebranded as TheGrio TV on January 15, 2021. Heartland also began airing on Hallmark Channel in January 2025. The show is also available on Netflix and various other streaming platforms in the United States.

== Cast and characters ==
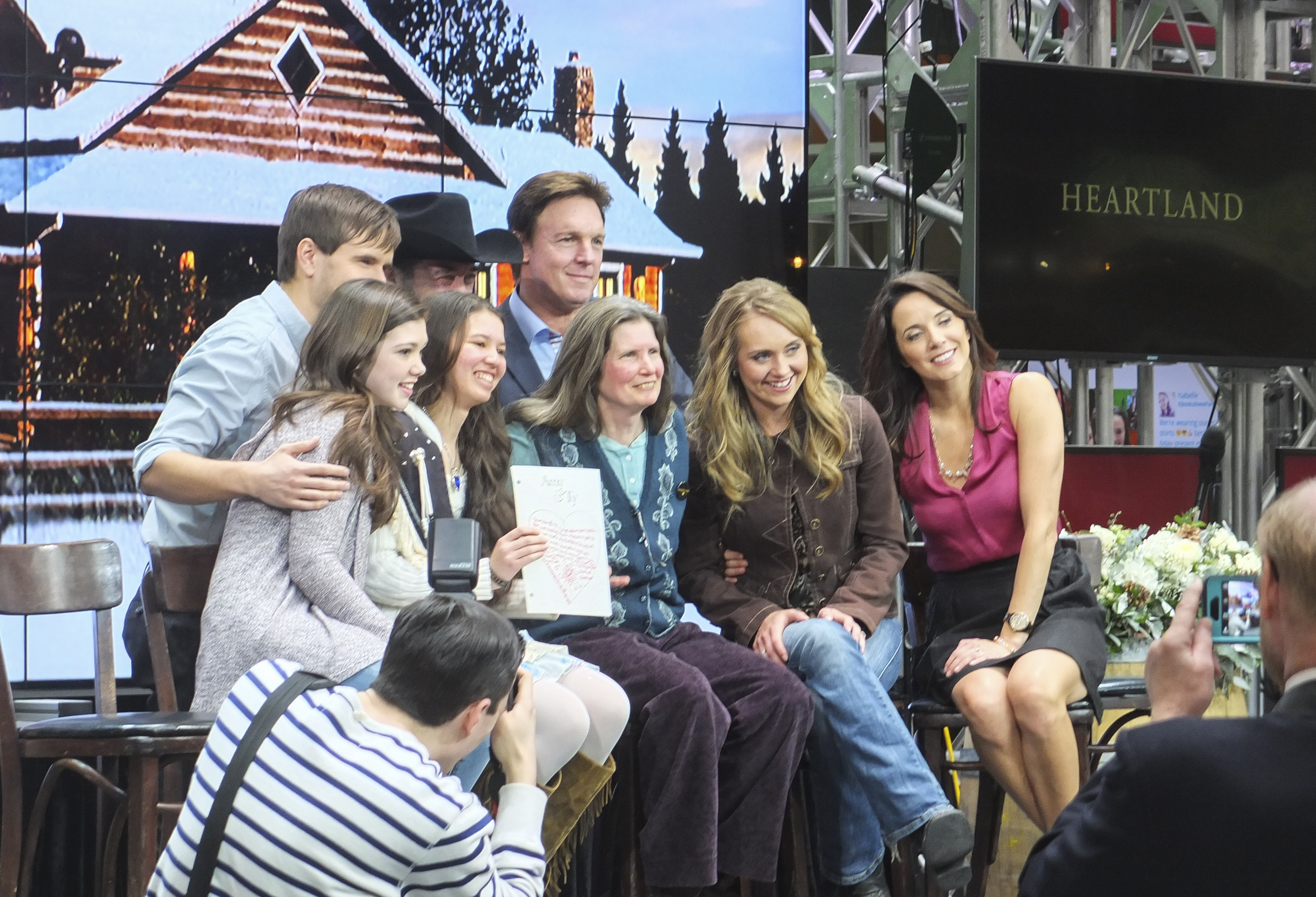
Members of the Heartland cast at a 2015 promotional event

=== Main ===
- Amber Marshall as Amy Fleming: The protagonist of the series, practices natural horsemanship, the intuitive training and healing method used by her late mother, Marion. When Amy was 15, she was seriously injured in a car crash that killed Marion. They were living with Marion's father (Amy's grandfather) Jack on his ranch, Heartland. While Amy recuperated, her estranged father Tim returned. Jack had banished Tim years earlier because of his alcohol and drug use. Amy adapts to her father re-entering her life, while her older sister Lou, who works in New York City, returns to Heartland after Marion's death. Jack begrudgingly accepts Tim, who tries to make amends for the past. Over time, Amy develops a close relationship with Ty Borden, a ranch hand working at Heartland as part of his probation. They fall in love, though the relationship is occasionally rocky. In the last episode of season 5, Ty plans to propose to Amy, but decides against it after overhearing her say she does not want to be tied down. They eventually marry, and, at the end of season 9, Amy is pregnant. At the end of Season 10, Amy gives birth to a girl, Lyndy Marion. In season 13, Amy and Ty become foster parents to Luke. Season 14 sees Amy dealing with Ty's accidental death and coping with being a single mother.
- Michelle Morgan as Samantha Louise "Lou" Fleming Morris: As the series opens, Lou returns home to help run Heartland, leaving behind her boyfriend and a lucrative business job in New York City. Upon discovering Heartland's poor financial situation, she crafts a financial plan to make the ranch profitable. After securing a bank loan, Lou takes over the business-end of Heartland, and later proposes creating the Heartland Equestrian Connection as a corporate retreat center. Family members derisively consider it as a "Dude Ranch". Lou rekindles a romance with local vet, Scott Cardinal. That relationship dissolves in season 2. She then meets Peter Morris, but their relationship is complicated by Peter's job in the oil industry. Lou and Peter marry at the end of season 3 and move to Dubai. Lou misses Heartland and her family and they move back. She gives birth to daughter Catherine Marion Minnie Fleming-Morris (“Katie”). Lou and Peter eventually buy Mr. Hanley's ranch. However, a fire demolishes the buildings and forces them to remain at Heartland. In Season 6, Lou and Peter adopt Georgina Crawley. In season 8, Peter's frequent long work absences stresses their marriage, and the couple separate. Lou is attracted to new stable hand, Mitch. Peter regularly visits his daughters, complicating Lou and Mitch's budding romance. In season 7, Lou buys Maggie's Diner and runs it with Tim, her supposedly "silent" business partner. Lou works on bringing Maggie's to New York City and spends much time commuting back and forth. Season 14 sees Lou become the Mayor of the town Hudson and the introduction of her side-kick and Chief Administrative Office Rick Adderly. Rick is the show's first openly gay character in the show's history and played by British actor Aidan Moreno.
- Shaun Johnston as Jackson "Jack" Bartlett: the family patriarch, was Marion's father and is Amy and Lou's grandfather. A former rodeo star, he owns Heartland. When Marion took over Heartland, it became a horse ranch. After her death, Jack helps Amy and Ty maintain Heartland and its horses and also repairs broken equipment, fences, and the like. Early in the series, he has a strained relationship with ex-son-in-law Tim, stemming from Tim's troubled past with alcohol and prescription drug abuse, his acrimonious divorce from Marion, and neglecting Amy and Lou when they were younger. Jack barely tolerates Tim at times, and they frequently argue over the running of the ranch. Jack was initially judgmental towards the new ranch hand, Ty, but gradually considers him like a son. Jack gives his blessing to Ty and Amy marrying. Jack's stubbornness and resistance to change sometimes causes friction between him and others, particularly with his romantic interest, Lisa Stillman, and granddaughter, Lou. Jack and Lisa elope in the season 7 finale. Jack suffers a heart attack and collapses in the field. Tim finds and saves him. Jack dotes on his three great-granddaughters, Katie, Georgie, and Lyndy.
- Chris Potter as Timothy "Tim" Fleming: Amy and Lou's father who left the family after he and Marion separated (Lou was fourteen, and Amy was five). After a rodeo accident, he struggled with prescription drug (painkiller) abuse and alcoholism. As a result, Jack kicked Tim out. After Amy and Lou's mother dies, he returns, moving to Big River Ranch, near Heartland. Tim has a relationship with the previous owner's daughter, who inherited the ranch. He later dates a jockey named Janice and nearly moves to California with her. However, in Season 4 Episode 18 ("Burning Down the House"), it is discovered that Tim has an 11-year-old son named Shane with Miranda Grenier, his ex-girlfriend. When he reveals this to Janice, she leaves for California without him. Shane stays with Tim at Heartland for a short period. After a brief custody battle, Shane returns to live with his mother, who later remarries. Tim starts a rodeo school, a horse-selling business, and begins a new relationship. After moving on, he has a long-term relationship with Casey. His star rodeo pupils are Jade Virani and Clay McMurtry, teenage bronc riders.

=== Supporting ===
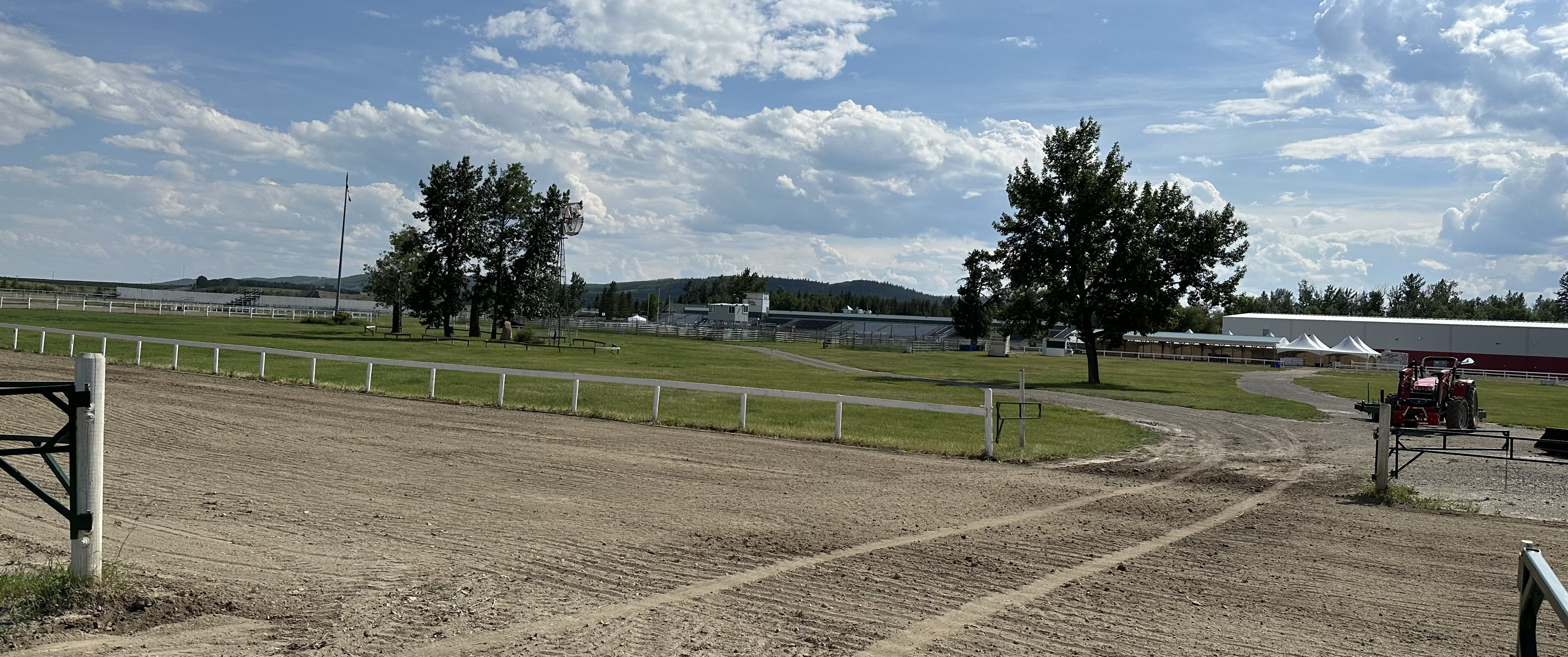
The Millarville Racing & Agricultural Society Grounds in Alberta, where many of the show's rodeo and racing scenes are filmed – the shift of locale to the Canadian West and the introduction of rodeo elements and backstories are two of the major departures from the original book series

- Kerry James as Caleb Odell

Caleb is a ranch hand hired by Jack after Ty leaves for four months. In the beginning he is rather husky, has feelings for Amy, and develops a strong rivalry with Ty. He and Amy have a short-lived relationship, but Amy soon goes back to Ty. He falls in love with Ashley Stanton, eventually marrying her. Caleb is a rodeo cowboy. Before marrying Ashley, Caleb is severely injured at a rodeo. After battling prescription drugs and alcohol, much like Tim's, he recovers but is much thinner. Caleb and Ashley have a difficult marriage, struggling with financial problems, pressure from Val Stanton (Ashley's mother), and differing life goals. Caleb and Ashley eloped, but after discovering that their officiator's license had expired, they have a wedding outside Caleb's trailer (where they had been living). They honeymoon in Italy and stay with one of Val's friends, but Caleb returns alone. Ashley eventually returns and decides to pursue postsecondary education in Vancouver. Caleb moves there to be with Ashley, but they drift apart as she makes new friends and spends more time away from Caleb. They eventually divorce, and Caleb returns to Hudson and resumes working at Heartland, while seasonally competing at the rodeo. After Ashley, Caleb pursues Lou's friend Nicole (who had moved from New York and works for Lou at the ranch). He has a relationship with Cassandra, who was a vet student working at Scott's clinic. Caleb and Cass have a pregnancy scare. They almost break up, but marry at the end of Season 10. Ty and Amy were to attend, but Amy went into labour just as they arrived, and they had to rush home. Caleb and Cassandra discover they are expecting in Season 13 ('The Art of Trust'). Cassandra gives birth to their son, Carson, sometime between the Season 13 finale and the Season 14 premiere.

- Gabriel Hogan as Peter Walter Morris

Peter is Lou's ex-husband. He was first introduced as PW, the owner of a small oil company called Bedford Oil that is caught drilling on Heartland property. Lou organized a protest against PW's company. In the meantime, one of Lisa's horse friends gives out Lou's email without her permission. Lou (using her first name, Sam) and PW (using his first name, Peter) begin a relationship over an instant messaging service. After meeting, they are shocked to discover each other's identity. Their relationship is kept secret because both Jack and Tim hate PW for being part of "Big Oil." Peter eventually wins the family's approval and he and Lou are married in the Season 3 finale. Peter's business immediately takes them to Dubai. Lou returns home for a one-week visit that stretches on because she misses Heartland and her family. Peter commutes to and from Dubai because Lou is expecting their first child. Peter ends up bankrupt in Dubai, and asks to move in with Lou at Jack's house. Peter recovers financially, but is only home on weekends due to his new job's location in Vancouver. In Season 7, Lou and Peter adopt Georgie after Jack is not approved as her legal guardian. Lou and Peter separate because Peter is always away in Vancouver. Peter is discovered to have a girlfriend in Vancouver, which causes Lou to end the relationship. Peter continues visiting Heartland to see his daughters.

- Jessica Steen as Lisa Stillman

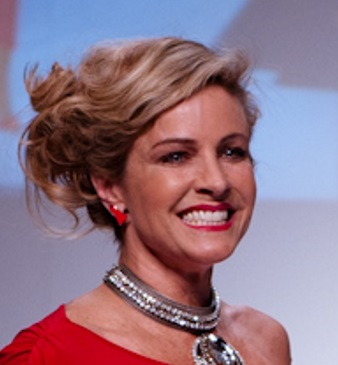
Jessica Steen

Lisa is the charismatic owner of Fairfield Stables (established in 1951, as per signage on the estate) and is a well-known racehorse breeder. She is introduced in the series' third episode when Scott recommends Amy's help in assisting with a troubled horse named Promise. Amy refers to Lisa's thoroughbreds as being "famous", indicating the Stillman name is renown in Fairfield. Lisa later begins a romantic relationship with Jack. During that first meeting, Lisa mentions she is looking after her nephew, Ben (Beau Michorff), as her sister Tammy has just been through a "nasty divorce". Lisa explains that she never liked Tammy's taste in men, and this led to an unfortunate estrangement when Tammy eloped with a man Lisa believed was only after the family money. Lisa expresses her deep regret that this broken relationship has never been mended.
In season 4, Lisa tells Lou she got married in a "whirlwind" to a man named Dan Hartfield, and moved to the Midwest U.S. In that conversation, Lisa reveals she was later obliged to return to Fairfield to care for her father when he fell sick. After the senior Stillman passed away, Lisa realized she had missed Fairfield more than she missed Dan, which eventually led to their divorce. Lisa has an aunt named Evelyn (portrayed by Kate Trotter), who is apparently wealthy, enjoys travelling, and is known to buy unusual and often impractical gifts for everyone. On a visit to Heartland, she was openly critical of Jack and Lisa's relationship. During the season, Lisa and a pregnant Lou have a dispute over how the Dude Ranch business should be run once Lou gives birth, with the latter discounting the former's advice to hire extra help. Lisa admits that she did think she would have children when she was married to Dan, but that "it didn't happen", an indication the couple experienced fertility issues and/or pregnancy loss. This eventually leads to Lou and Peter asking Lisa to be godmother to their soon-to-be-born child (Katie), and Lisa accepts. (Apocryphally, she is Georgie's godmother as well, a detail revealed only in an entry of Lou's Mom's the Word blog—an extra feature offered by the series interactive media department—but has not been explicitly mentioned in-series. The Mom's the Word blog site is now defunct.)

Lisa is often in the south of France seasonally for work, and her jet-set lifestyle becomes a difficulty in her relationship with Jack. They remain together until season 6, where they break up after he visits her in France. By the end of season 6, Lisa is back in France, but writes to Jack, expressing a desire to reconcile. Jack suffers a heart attack the very evening he receives the letter. In season 7, Lisa returned to Hudson to take care of Jack when he was convalescing after his heart attack. The two still have feelings for each other, and during an ill-fated trip to Montana, the two rekindle their romance.

At the end of season 7, Jack proposes to Lisa with his grandmother's wedding ring, and they elope at the Dude Ranch. Tim crashes the simple ceremony, and insists on being Jack's best man. Following the elopement, they decide to continue living separately. Lisa chooses not to change her name to 'Bartlett', and Jack chooses not to wear a wedding ring. In season 11, it is revealed that Lisa's business is floundering as she struggles to keep Fairfield running and all her staff employed, a fact she initially hides from Jack. She eventually admits her problems and asks to move in with him at Heartland, to which he readily agrees.

- Baye McPherson as Katie Fleming Morris

Catherine "Katie" Marion Minnie Fleming Morris is Lou and Peter's only biological daughter, born in episode 67, "Passages." As an infant, the family took a large amount of time getting her to sleep through the night, and an episode featured this difficulty. Mallory is often brought in to babysit, since she's often at Heartland anyway, and interested in earning extra cash. In Season 7, Katie often cries at night for Lou, who is in the Atlantic provinces on a tour for her book, "Mom's the Word." Katie also starts bed-wetting, presumably for the same reason. As a result, Peter and Katie eventually join Lou on her book tour. Later in the series, Lou worries that Katie is not progressing as she should, taking her to see a pediatrician to check for abnormalities. This causes friction between Lou and Peter, as he believes that Katie is fine, which turns out to be the case. As of Season 10, Katie is a young, energetic girl who enjoys spending time with her family, especially her adoptive older sister Georgie and her great-grandfather. She has a favorite stuffed toy pony, called "Pogy." As a baby, Katie was played by twin sisters Keira and Jordan, and between Season 8 and Season 11, Katie was portrayed by Julia Maren Baker, who was replaced by Ziya Matheson in Season 12. Yet another change took place at the beginning of season 15 when the character was taken over by Baye McPherson.

- Lucian-River Chauhan as Luke Kashani

Luke is a troubled foster kid that Clint brings to Heartland hoping Amy and Ty could help him. Over time and despite some difficulties, he becomes a part of the family. After his biological mother realizes she should not have custody of him, it is decided it is in the boy's best interest to remain at Heartland. In season 13 Amy and Ty become his foster parents briefly before he goes back home to his mom. He is never mentioned again.

- Ava Tran as Parker Yang

Parker is Jade Virani's step-sister who has moved to Hudson from Toronto. She is an outspoken environmental activist who doesn't back down from her opinions who befriends Katie.

- Ruby & Emmanuella Spencer as Lyndy Marion Borden

Amy and Ty's daughter, born in Episode 175, "Greater Expectations". Her guardians (godparents), should anything happen to Amy and Ty, are Caleb and Cassandra.

=== Recurring ===
- Alisha Newton as Georgina "Georgie" Fleming Morris (Crawley)

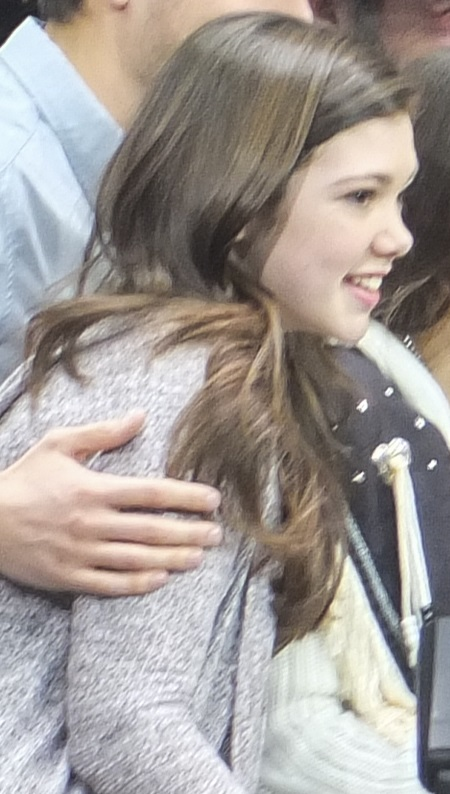
Alisha Newton

Georgie is Lou and Peter's adopted daughter who was orphaned at age 3. After the foster care system separated her and her brother, Jeff, Georgie developed serious behavioral problems, though her behavior gradually improves. Georgie, a natural equestrian and a tomboy, is fearless, talented, strong-minded, and clever. This initially makes Mallory, a young family friend, jealous. Georgie grows close to the family but occasionally misbehaves, even running away once. In later seasons, Georgie joins the Extreme Team, a trick riding group, replacing show jumping as Georgie's main equestrian activity. She develops romantic feelings for Adam Parker, her tutor. Georgie and Adam briefly date but break up when Adam thinks she has feelings for Clay McMurtry. By seasons 14 and 15, she is in a relationship with newcomer Quinn. He encourages Georgie to revive her dream of competing in the Olympics. She begins training at his family's Florida ranch. Although billed as "main cast" during this time, Georgie later becomes more of a "recurring character" due to her infrequent visits back to Heartland. She was absent for all of season 15 and much of 16 after Newton left the main cast for nearly two seasons to pursue other acting opportunities. She returned for the last two episodes of season 16. Early on in season 16, Georgie gets into a riding accident during one of the competitions off screen that lead her to be nearly paralyzed. She returned to the ranch on screen at the end of season 16, after her character made a physical recovery to deal with the trauma of her accident.

- Laara Sadiq as Dr. Tricia Virani.

She is Jade's mother. Although she arrived in Heartland as a tourist, Lou soon requested her help to tend to Jack, in exchange for riding lessons. While Tim offers to be an instructor, they eventually end up having a brief love affair.

- Kevin McGarry as Mitch Cutty

Mitch is hired as a ranch hand at Heartland and works hard to earn the family's respect, especially with Jack and Tim. After much hostility, Tim nicknames Mitch "Trooper" after a tenacious but respectable bronc on the circuit. Following an awkward first "date," Mitch and Lou enter into an off-and-on relationship. Mitch is troubled by guilt due to the loss of his cousin to PTSD but confides in Lou and they earn each other's trust. Following a breakup with Lou, Mitch begins dating "new age" yoga instructor Maya which forces Lou to confront her true feelings for him.

- Roger LeBlanc as Bob Grainger

Bob runs a wildlife reserve.

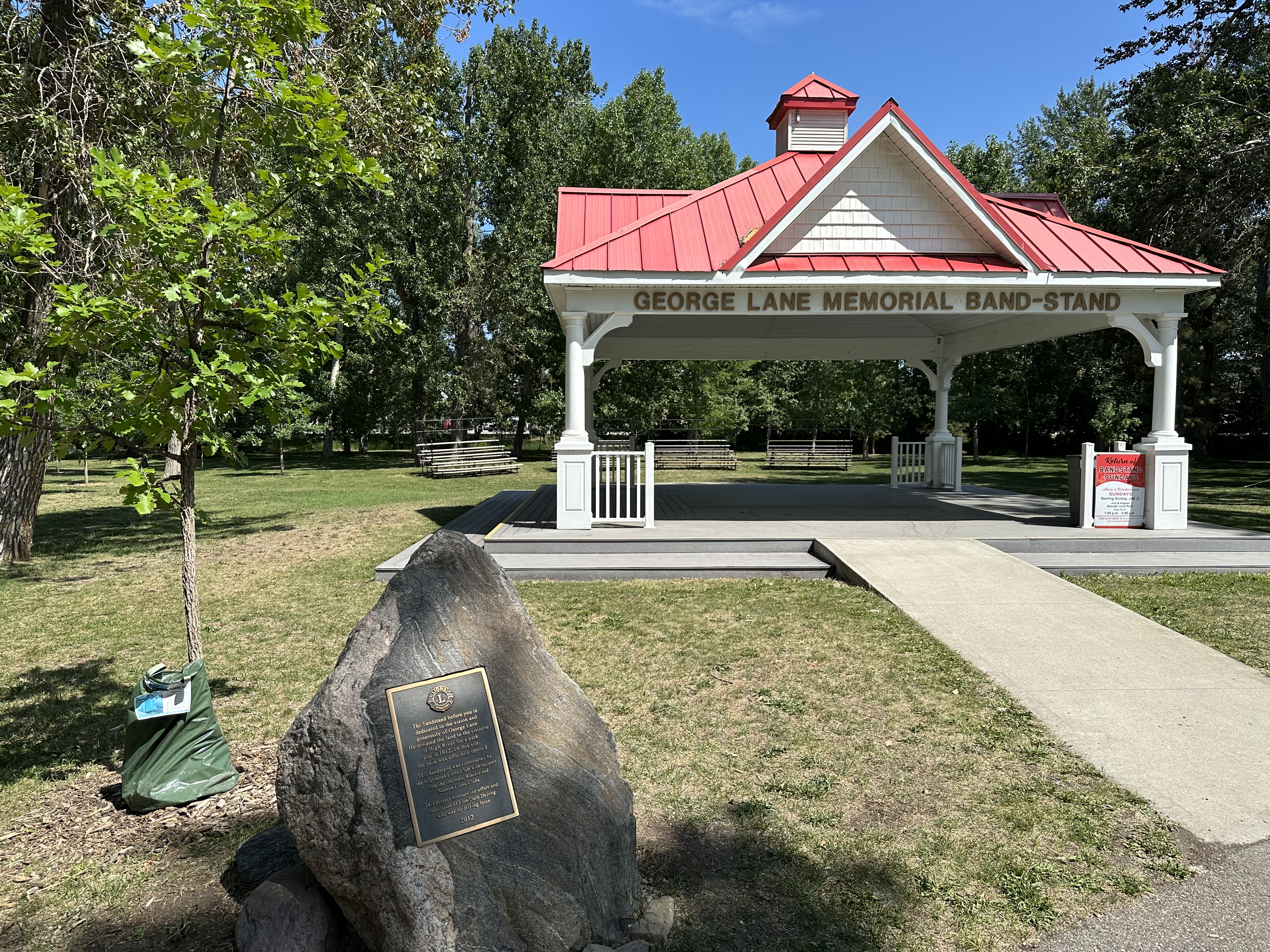
The bandstand within George Lane Memorial Park in High River, the location of high school graduations in the series and the backdrop for a number of other scenes

- Kataem O'Connor as Adam Parker

Adam is Georgie's math tutor and becomes her first serious boyfriend.

- Helen Colliander as Olivia Wheaton

Olivia is Georgie's rival throughout the series but later becomes her friend.

- Madison Cheeatow as Jade Virani

Jade is Georgie's friend and Dr. Virani's daughter. She is a bronc rider and lives in Caleb's old trailer for a time to assert her independence. Tim is doubtful of Jade at first but grows to respect her tenacity and talent.

- Kaitlyn Leeb as Cassandra "Cass" Odell

Introduced as one of Ty's classmates at veterinarian school, Cassandra ends up working at the vet clinic with Ty. She initially appears to be an ambitious and arrogant know-it-all, which makes Amy uncomfortable. She is romantically involved with Jeremy Hughes until he sabotages Heartland, after which she is fired from the vet clinic and forced to take a job at the dude ranch, to which she is ill-suited. Scott convinces a reluctant Ty to give Cass another chance at their understaffed clinic, where she eventually becomes a good friend to Amy and Ty. She and Caleb wind up in a long-term relationship and are married in the final episode of season 10. And in season 13 episode 7 Cassandra tells Caleb that she's pregnant with their first child. Between Seasons 13 and 14, Cassandra gives birth to her son, Carson.

- Greta Onieogou as Soraya Duval

Amy's best friend who works at Maggie's, her mom's diner. Soraya always supports Amy and becomes friends with Ashley around the same time as Amy. She later visits London, England and meets a new boyfriend. In Season 5, Soraya moves to London permanently. She briefly returns at the end of season 8 to attend Amy and Ty's wedding at the Heartland Ranch.

- Wanda Cannon as Valerie "Val" Stanton

Ashley and Jesse's widowed mother, and the main antagonist throughout much of the series. Val is the proud owner of Briar Ridge Stables and uses more traditional methods of horse training compared to Heartland. Val puts too much pressure on Ashley to win horse shows, but loves and spoils her daughter. She is also friends with Jack, particularly when Jack helps her to work on her relationship with her daughter, after Ashley becomes more independent and rebellious.

- Anna Ferguson as Mrs. Sally Bell

A long-time family friend of the Fleming/Bartlett family who owns Sugarfoot, a cute Shetland pony whom Lou learned to ride on. Mrs. Bell keeps Sugarfoot in her house as a companion, and prefers using her herbal remedies on him rather than having him cared for by Scott or the farrier. Mrs. Bell made Marion's and Amy's wedding dresses. Her last appearance to date was Amy and Ty's wedding.

- Michelle Nolden as Jessica Cook

Jessica is Lou's former Strickland & Cook boss from New York. She comes to Hudson to meet with Lou to apologize for firing her back in Season 1. Lou had formerly been deeply resentful of the firing, believing Jessica to be cutthroat and brutal in her business life. Jessica, however, reveals she recently went through a bout with cancer. As a result, she turned over a new leaf, quit the firm, and decided to travel and indulge in her hobbies, one of which is photography. Her stay in Hudson goes longer than anticipated, leading to sparks flying between her and Tim.

- Spencer Lord as Nathan Pryce Jr.

=== Guest or former cast ===
==== Main ====
- Jessica Amlee as Mallory Wells Anderson

A friend of the family who visited frequently and often stayed overnight, Mallory is the daughter of a Canadian country music artist (real-life Canadian country music artist George Canyon), whose music she finds annoying, and is hired by Lou to babysit Katie on a regular basis. She was mostly known for talking too much and prying into everyone's personal lives, which often got her into trouble. Mallory rides the horses at Heartland and participates in jumping competitions. She is easily infatuated with boys, and has a crush on Ty early in the series, though her main love interests wind up being Jake Anderson and Badger. Mallory leaves Heartland several times, most significantly to attend an all-girls boarding school to which she is sent by her parents when her father goes on tour the first time. Jake helps her buy a bus ticket and return to Heartland. At the end of Season 5, she announced with dismay that she was moving to Nashville for her father's music career, though she and her family returned to Canada in season 6. In season 7, she finally confessed her feelings for Jake and went with him to Paris. In season 10, episode 14, Mallory came back to Heartland and married him.

- Cindy Busby as Ashley Stanton

In season 1, she fulfilled the archetype of the high-school mean girl, but after Amy helps Ashley improve her show-jumping and later saves her horse Apollo, Ashley warms up to Amy and her best friend Soraya. Ashley's character develops substantially from this point, and she is shown to struggle in her relationship with her mother. As a result, she lives at Heartland for a short period of time and later stays with Caleb, in his rented trailer. Ashley gradually falls for Caleb in Season 2 and starts a serious relationship with him, and they marry in the season 3 finale. It took Ashley a while to come back from their honeymoon in Italy, resulting in Caleb coming home alone. Later in the series, Ashley and Caleb moved away so she could attend college. Caleb returned alone again, and they eventually got a divorce. In season 7, episode nine, she comes back to see her friends. She's now becoming a lawyer.

- Nathaniel Arcand as Scott Cardinal (Recurring seasons 1–8, 10–11; guest seasons 9, 15–16)

A close Native Canadian friend of the Bartlett/Fleming household and also Heartland's vet. Scott had a troubled background, but Marion helped him turn his life around. Scott and Lou have a relationship for the first two seasons. He later regrets losing her and for not trying harder to win her back. In season 2, Ty tells Amy that Scott has agreed to let Ty be his apprentice and that Scott will mentor him to possibly work with him after veterinary school. Ty eventually attends veterinary school at the University of Calgary, and works part-time at Scott's clinic in later seasons. He is also joined by Cassandra, another U.o.C vet student who is a year or two ahead of Ty. Scott later offers Ty to be his partner in the clinic.

- Graham Wardle as Tyler "Ty" Borden (Main seasons 1–14; guest seasons 15–16)

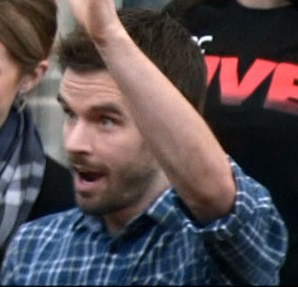
Graham Wardle

When Ty was a child, he was abused by his stepfather Wade, whom he attacked for assaulting Ty's mother. The incident resulted in Ty's arrest and being sent to juvenile hall; to complete his probation, Marion Fleming offered him a job as a ranch hand at Heartland. He soon begins to enjoy his life there and decides to stay after completing his probation, though he leaves for a short period to live with his biological father in Calgary. Jack treats Ty like a son and is very proud of him, especially after he earns his high school diploma and decides to study to become a vet. Ty at first is known as the "new cute guy" by Amy's friends, and Amy quickly falls for him. Ty dated Kit Bailey, a local cowgirl, for a time before he admitted his feelings for Amy. He and Amy have a tumultuous relationship over the subsequent seasons. In the season 5 finale, Ty buys a ring with plans to propose to Amy, but rethinks his proposal after hearing Amy say they should never "tie themselves down." When Amy discovers the ring, Ty and Amy agree to wait, and Ty is accepted to vet school and begins assisting Scott at his clinic. While camping, Ty finds the perfect moment to propose to Amy, who accepts, and they later marry. After Amy tells Ty that he is going to become a father, she supports his decision to go to Mongolia to save the last of the Gobi bears with Veterinarians Without Borders. Near the end of the season 10, Ty contracts a potentially life-threatening illness from a tick bite and returns to Calgary in critical condition. Later, Caleb breaks Ty out of the hospital so that he can be the best man at Caleb & Cass's wedding. However, Amy goes into labor as they arrive at the church and they rush home for the birth of their daughter. In season 13, Amy and Ty become foster parents to a young boy named Luke, and towards the end of the season, both are shot by a poacher. In the season 14 premiere, it is revealed that though Amy survived, Ty suddenly collapsed and dies from deep vein thrombosis, a complication arising after being shot.

- Aidan Moreno as Rick Adderly (seasons 14–17; guest season 18)

Chief Administrative Officer for the Mayor's Office and Lou Fleming's assistant. Rick is the show's first openly LGBTQ+ character.

- Victoria Pratt as Casey McMurtry

Casey, formerly a pro barrel racer, was in a relationship with Tim when she returns to Hudson after the death of her husband, Hank "The Tank" McMurtry. She convinced Tim to start a rodeo school. She is the sister-in-law of Jen, who has served as Lou's Dude Ranch and Maggie's Diner manager, and the aunt of Wyatt and Brick. Following Tim's brain cancer scare, Tim pushes Casey away, eventually leading to a permanent break-up.

- Suzanne Coy as Margaret "Maggie" Duval

Soraya's smart aleck mother and Marion's best friend who was the original owner of the tack and feed store Maggie's Diner. Maggie leaves in early Season 7 to live in London, England to be near Soraya. (Coy passed away on August 11, 2023.)

- Keegan Connor Tracy as Crystal

Georgie's biological aunt who has intentions that are not initially seen. After Georgie breaks her arm, Crystal visits Heartland and files child abuse claims against Lou and Peter to extort money from them in exchange for dropping the charges. Georgie and the social worker overhear this and Crystal leaves empty handed and facing a possible arrest.

- Ben Cardinal as Victor Whitetail

Marion's good friend who fixes horses and people. Victor enjoys golf and once had an affair with Marion after Tim left her. Victor's horse style is different from Amy's, and he helps her a couple times during the series.

- Torrance Coombs as Chase Powers

Amy's rival in "The Ring of Fire." Following a clinic they did together, he kisses her. Later, Ty confronts him about it and hits him twice, once for running Mrs. Bell off the road and once for kissing Amy. While getting ice for the bruises, Chase and Soraya become friends. He is later invited to Amy and Soraya's graduation party as Soraya's date. There he kisses Soraya and they begin dating. In "Leap of Faith," he asks Amy to come along with him and Soraya to a movie. He tells Amy when she arrives that Soraya had to study. After the movie it is shown that he still likes Amy. During "The River," Soraya ends the relationship.

- Raoul Trujillo as Renard

Amy's new friend who runs "Dark Horse," a popular traveling horse show.

- Emma Lahana as Blair Conner

A friend of Ty's, who spent time with him working at a ranch in Montana. She came with him to Heartland when he returned to Amy in season 4. She was the source of considerable friction between Amy and Ty, when she pursued Ty during her first appearance, and later when she told her boyfriend, Grant, that she and Ty had "hooked up."

- Beau Mirchoff as Benjamin "Ben" Stillman

Lisa's arrogant nephew. Ben competes in show jumping competitions with his horse Red. He worked and trained at Heartland for part of a season, but later chooses to train at Briar Ridge, likely due to a mutual attraction to Ashley Stanton. His last appearance was Episode 113 Coming Together.

- Stephen Amell as Nicholas "Nick" Harwell

A champion rider. Amy helps Nick's horse in "Born to Run."

== Episodes ==
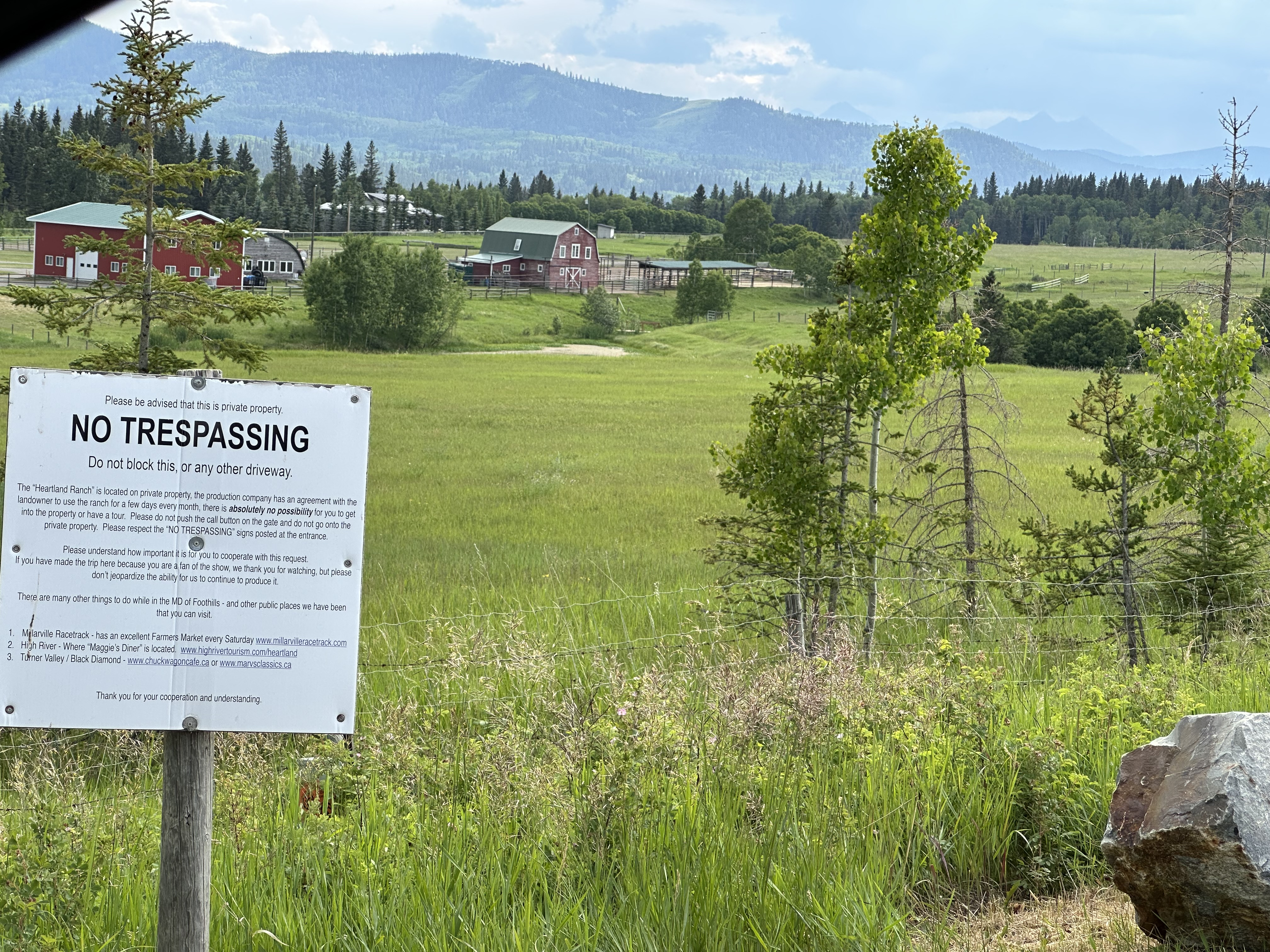
The ranch used for filming Heartland exteriors is located on private land, with a sign at its boundary politely but firmly guiding fans of the show to go no further.

Season	Episodes	Originally released	
Season	Episodes	First released	Last released
1	13	October 14, 2007	February 24, 2008
2	18	October 5, 2008	March 22, 2009
3	18	October 4, 2009	March 28, 2010
4	18	September 26, 2010	March 27, 2011
Film		December 12, 2010	
5	18	September 18, 2011	March 25, 2012
6	18	September 16, 2012	April 7, 2013
7	18	October 6, 2013	April 13, 2014
8	18	September 28, 2014	March 29, 2015
9	18	October 4, 2015	March 20, 2016
10	18	October 2, 2016	March 26, 2017
11	18	September 24, 2017	April 8, 2018
12	11	January 6, 2019	April 7, 2019
13	10	September 22, 2019	November 24, 2019
14	10	January 10, 2021	March 21, 2021
15	10	October 17, 2021	December 19, 2021
16	15	October 2, 2022	February 5, 2023
17	10	October 1, 2023	December 3, 2023
18	10	October 6, 2024	December 8, 2024
19	10	October 5, 2025	December 7, 2025
20	10	October 4, 2026	December 6, 2026

== Filming locations ==
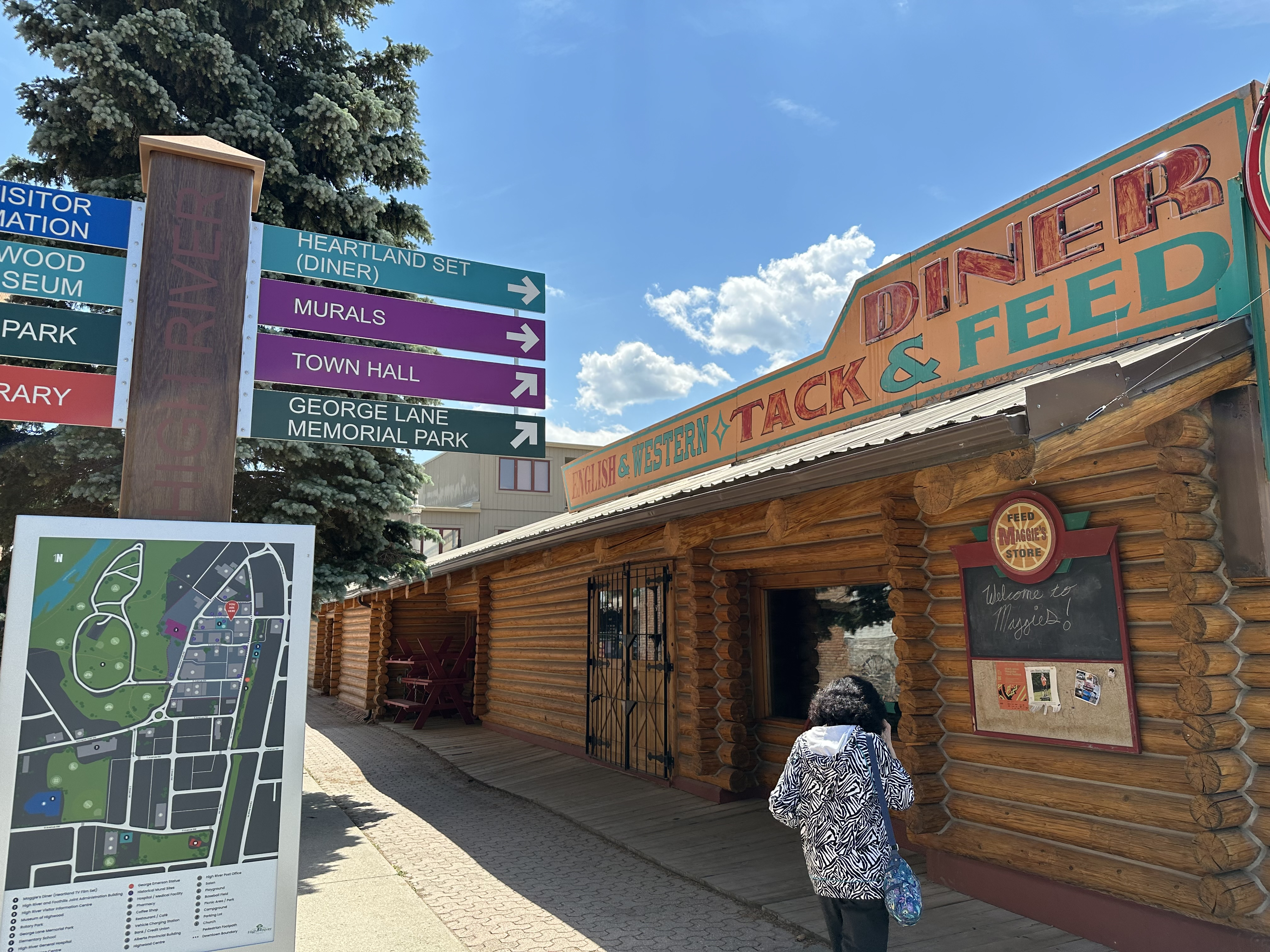

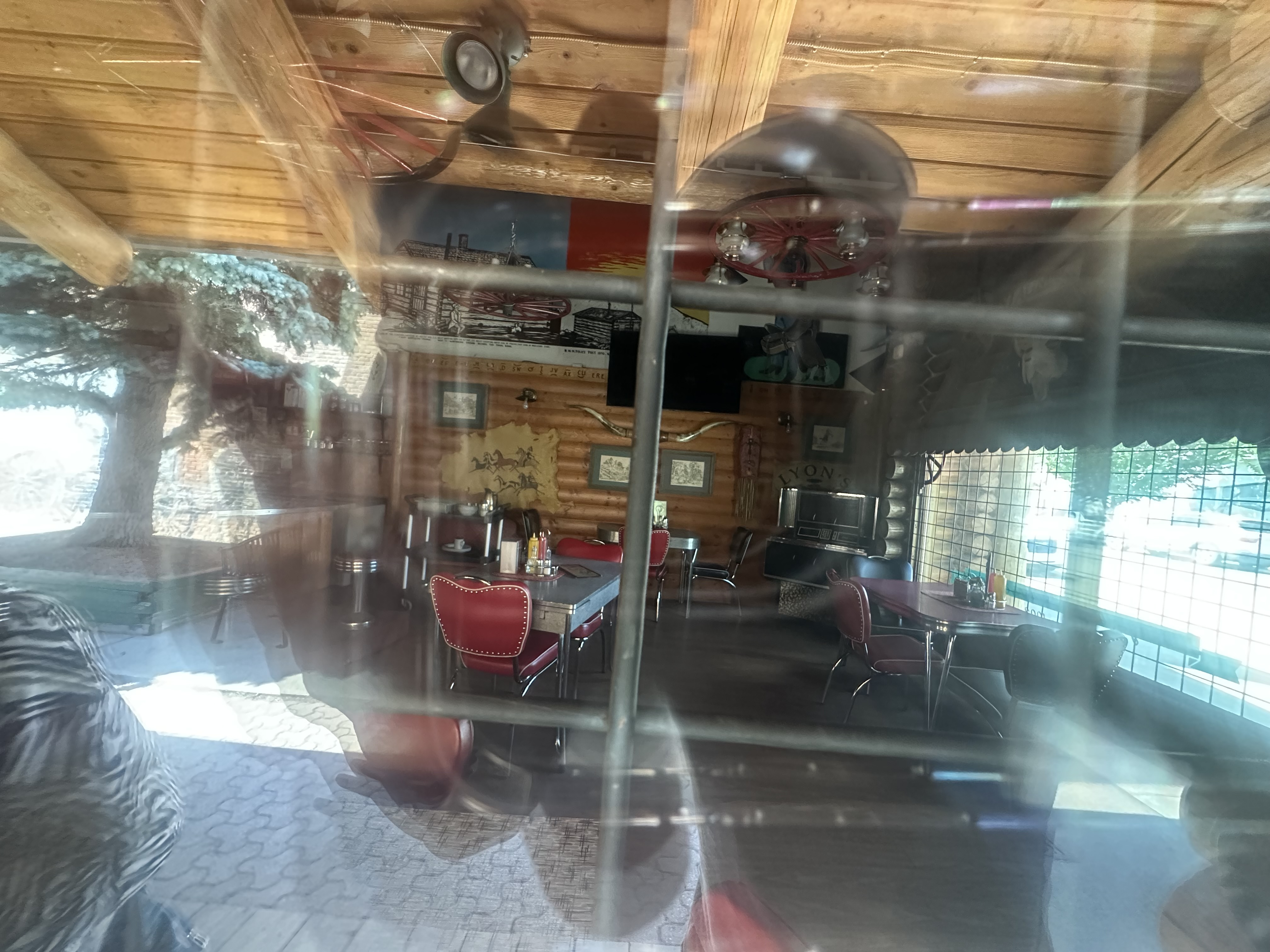
Maggie's Diner Tack and Feed Store is a permanent set located in the middle of High River, Alberta. When no filming is being done, the public can peer into its interior.

Much of the series is filmed on location in and around High River, Alberta, with additional filming in studio and on location in nearby Calgary. A June 2013 flood in High River swamped the standing set for Maggie's Diner. The main Heartland sets escaped damage, and seventh season scripts were rewritten to move shooting locations for the fictional town of Hudson to Inglewood, a historic neighbourhood in downtown Calgary. A month after the flood, the show's Calgary studios offered behind-the-scenes tours to paying fans for a one-day "Heartlanders for High River" fundraiser, providing $80,000 to help the town recover.

Heartland filmed some of its interiors at an abandoned military base, Currie Barracks, scheduled for redevelopment.

== Home media ==
Entertainment One has released the first seven seasons of Heartland on DVD in Region 1 (Canada only). The standalone TV movie A Heartland Christmas was released on DVD in Canada on November 1, 2011 and in the United States on October 29, 2013. Season 8 was released in Canada on October 6, 2015.

In Region 2, 4Digital Media has released the first 6 seasons on DVD in the UK.

In Region 4, Season 1 and Season 2 Parts 1 and 2 have been released by Roadshow Home Video.

Season	Ep#	Release dates		
Season	Ep#	Region 1	Region 2	Region 4
Season 1, Part 1	7	September 15, 2009	—N/a	—N/a
Season 1, Part 2	6	November 10, 2009	—N/a	—N/a
The Complete First Season	13	April 20, 2010	April 26, 2010	August 31, 2010
Season 2, Part 1		—N/a	—N/a	December 2, 2010
Season 2, Part 2		—N/a	—N/a	March 3, 2011
The Complete Second Season	18	May 4, 2010	June 27, 2011	—N/a
The Complete Third Season	18	March 22, 2011	February 13, 2012	—N/a
The Complete Fourth Season	18	November 1, 2011	February 27, 2012	—N/a
The Complete Fifth Season	18	September 18, 2012	November 19, 2012	—N/a
The Complete Sixth Season	18	October 15, 2013	August 12, 2013	—N/a
The Complete Seventh Season	18	September 28, 2014	September 21, 2015	—N/a
The Complete Eighth Season	18	October 6, 2015	November 16, 2015	—N/a
The Complete Ninth Season	18	November 1, 2016	July 25, 2016	—N/a
The Complete Tenth Season	18	2017	November 13, 2017	—N/a
The Complete Eleventh Season	18	2018	November 12, 2018	unknown
The Complete Twelfth Season	11	2019	December 2, 2019	—N/a
The Complete Thirteenth Season	10	2020	November 30, 2020	unknown
The Complete Fourteenth Season	10	May 22, 2021	unknown	unknown

Other releases	Release dates		
Other releases	Region 1	Region 2	Region 4
A Heartland Christmas	November 1, 2011		

== Reception ==
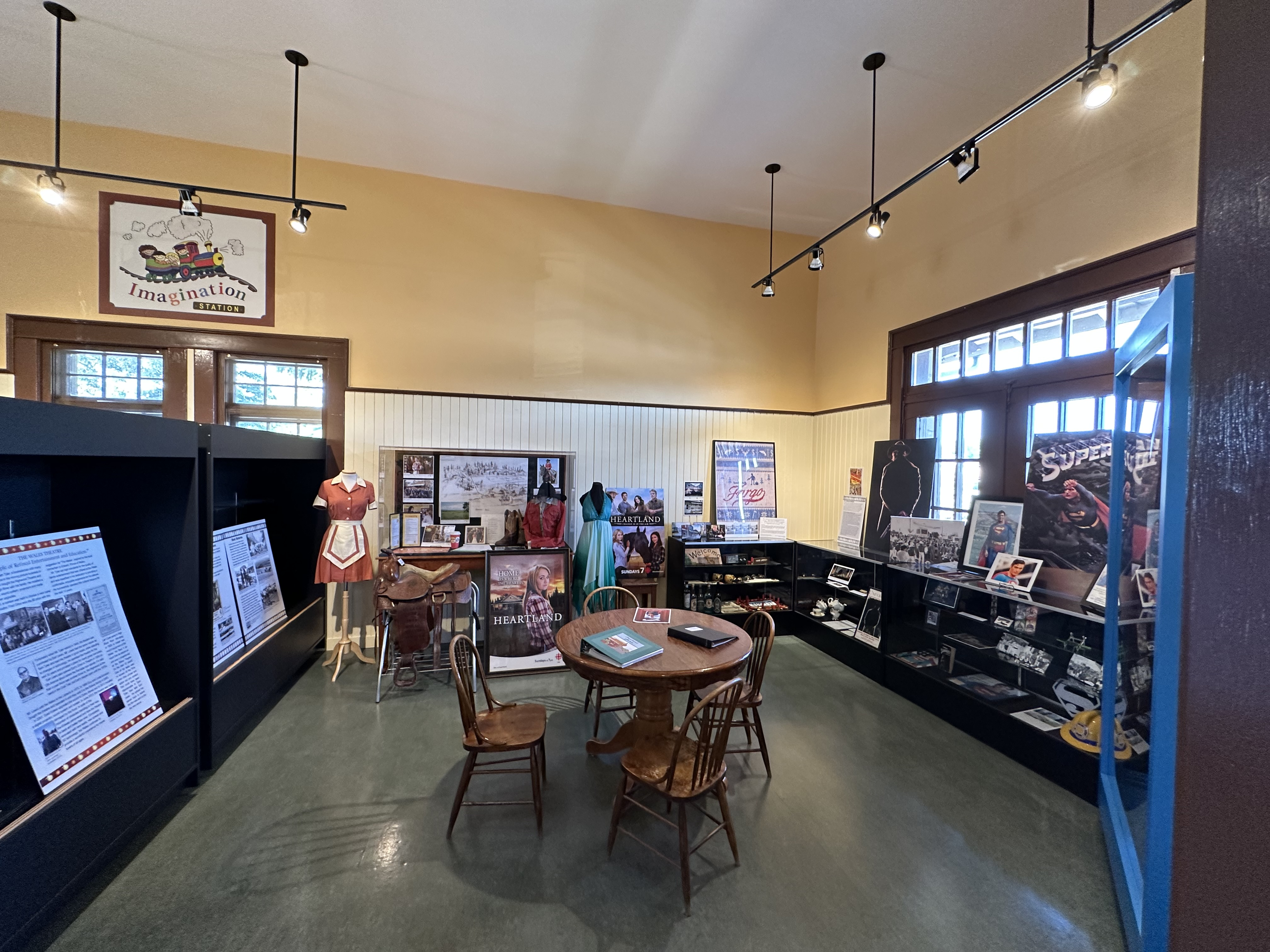
The Museum of the Highwood in High River, Alberta, has an exhibit of Heartland costumes, posters, set directions, and other memorabilia.

=== Ratings ===
In its series premiere, Heartland beat Global's comedy Da Kink in My Hair with 513,000 viewers in a battle of two new series. After four episodes, Heartland had an average viewership of 464,000. In its first-season finale, Heartland attracted 625,000 viewers. The third-season premiere brought in over one million viewers, a new record for the show. The 100th episode "After All We've Been Through" was watched by 945,000 viewers.

== Spin-off web series ==
A six-part spin-off web series titled Hudson with Jade Virani as the protagonist was released on CBC Gem on March 31, 2019. It won the Best Web Series award at the Calgary Society of Independent Filmmakers's second annual Stinger Awards.
