= Shaun Johnston =

Canadian actor (born 1958)

- Born: September 9, 1958 (age 68); Ponoka, Alberta, Canada
- Occupations: Actor, director, singer, guitar player
- Years active: 1990–present

Shaun Johnston is a Canadian movie and theater actor best known for his role as Jack Bartlett on the CBC drama Heartland, which debuted in October 2007. He co-founded the Shadow Theatre in Edmonton and made his first professional forays in Alberta's thriving theatre scene.

== Biography ==
Johnston grew up in Ponoka, Alberta. He earned a Bachelor of Fine Arts from the University of Alberta's drama program.

Johnston is well-known for playing the role of Jack Bartlett (also known as "Grandpa Jack") on Heartland, a CBC drama that debuted in October 2007. By 2019, he had played a role on the show for 13 seasons. In 2019, and again in 2020, Johnston was nominated for a Rosie award for "Best Alberta Actor," for his role in Heartland. In 2016, Johnston described his experience on the cast of Heartland, saying "it's the best job I’ve ever had, it's the best job I'm ever going to have."

In 2020, Global News reported that Johnston was in the process of "recording and releasing" The Book of Shaun: A Story Behind His Heartland Music. The Book of Shaun is a multi-episode music project that tells "the story behind songs that he has written for the Canadian TV show" that was created in order to raise funds for a 20-home building project led by the Okanagan affiliate of Habitat for Humanity.

== Filmography ==
=== Film ===
- 1990 Blood Clan as Jerry
- 1997 Ms. Bear as Barney Porter
- 1998 Heart of the Sun as Harry
- 1999 Mystery, Alaska as District Attorney Doloff
- 1999 Silver Wolf as Frank McLean
- 2001 Viva Las Nowhere as Sheriff
- 2003 The Hitcher II: I've Been Waiting as Sheriff Castillo
- 2004 Ginger Snaps 2: Unleashed as Jack
- 2005 Supervolcano as Matt
- 2005 A Friend of the Family as Coleridge
- 2006 Broken Trail as Bob "Smallpox Bob"
- 2007 Carolina Moon as Hannabal Bodeen
- 2007 Bury My Heart at Wounded Knee as Colonel Nelson A. Miles
- 2007 September Dawn as Captain Alexander Fancher
- 2009 Screamers: The Hunting as Haggard Man
- 2019 In Plainview as Reverend Rickman
- 2024 A Bluegrass Christmas as Jack Pendleton “Big Hickory”

=== Television ===
- 1995 The X-Files as Pete Calcagni
- 1995–1997 Jake and the Kid as Jake Trumper
- 1996–2000 Traders as Ben Sullivan
- 1998–2001 Mentors as Roy Cates
- 1998–2005 Da Vinci's Inquest as Marshal Sid Flemming
- 2000 The Outer Limits as Parker
- 2001 Smallville as Jordan's Dad
- 2004 Chicks with Sticks as Luke
- 2008 Mayerthorpe
- 2016 Delmer & Marta as Tom
- 2016–2018 Wynonna Earp as Juan Carlos
- 2007–present Heartland as Jackson "Jack" Bartlett
