= Lauren Brooke =

Pen name of co-authors Linda Chapman and Beth Chambers

Lauren Brooke is the pen name of popular author Linda Chapman and Beth Chambers who have written the books for "Heartland". Beth Chambers went on to write the series "Chestnut Hill" which Cathy Hapka also contributed toward.

In 2007, Heartland was adapted into a television series which began airing on CBC Television in Canada.

== Selected works ==
- Heartland (novel series)
- Chestnut Hill (novel series)
