= Heartland (novel series) =

26-novel series

- Cover of Heartland book #10, Tomorrow's Promise
- Author: Lauren Brooke
- Country: USA
- Genre: Children's literature
- Publisher: Scholastic Books
- Published: 2000-2008
- Media type: paperback
- No. of books: 25
- Website: Heartland at Scholastic Canada

Heartland is a children's book series written by Lauren Brooke, comprising 25 books published between 2000 and 2008. The series was originally targeted towards grade 4-7 readers and is now out of print.

The novels were adapted for television by CBC in 2007. The show, also called Heartland, is "much loved" and, as of 2026, is still in production.

== Plot ==
The series focuses on a 15-year-old girl named Amy Fleming, who lives in Virginia on a horse ranch called Heartland, where her family rehabilitates abused and neglected horses. The events of Coming Home kick off when Amy's mother, Marion, is killed in an accident. As the series progresses, Amy finds healing along with the horses that she treats.

Heartland, which focuses on alternative therapeutic methods for its equine patients, is the result of Marion's vision; Amy owes her knowledge of herbal remedies and training techniques to her mother. After Marion's death, Amy and her older sister, Lou, along with their grandfather, Jack, are left to operate Heartland. Amy struggles with her emotions after her mother's death, but eventually decides to take over her mother's legacy, aided by her own talent for working with horses.

Lou, grappling with her own grief, seeks to locate their father, Tim. He abandoned the family when Amy was small, after a riding accident left him paralyzed. Tim had begun to regret leaving his family before the events of the novels; he had sent Marion a letter which she did not respond to. Tim visits Heartland in book 8 and gradually rebuilds his relationship with his daughters.

As the series progresses, Amy becomes closer with Ty, a stable hand. They eventually begin dating. Lou marries the local veterinarian, Scott Trewin and has a daughter.

At the end of the main series, Amy decides to attend college over staying at Heartland. She and Ty break up, but remain friends as of A Winter's Gift.

== Adaptations ==
Michael Weinberg, then an investment banker, read the books at the recommendation of a friend. He found them juvenile, but thought the story had potential for TV if it were made more family oriented. He acquired the rights to the series and filmed a pilot for CBC in 2006.

CBC ordered the series, also called Heartland, which debuted in 2007 and—as of 2026—has run for 19 seasons with Weinberg as executive producer. The show aired in the US on The CW until 2010, when it moved to the family-oriented cable network Up TV.

The first season drew from the book series for story ideas, then continued to develop independently. The setting was changed from Virginia to the Canadian province of Alberta.

== Works ==
=== Main Series ===
1. "Coming Home" (June 2000)
2. "After the Storm" (June 2000)
3. "Breaking Free" (October 2000)
4. "Taking Chances" (February 2001)
5. "Come What May" (June 2001)
6. "One Day You'll Know" (October 2001)
7. "Out of Darkness" (February 2002)
8. "Thicker Than Water" (June 2002)
9. "Every New Day" (September 2002)
10. "Tomorrow's Promise" (December 2002)
11. "True Enough" (March 2003)
12. "Sooner or Later" (June 2003)
13. "Darkest Hour" (September 2003)
14. "Everything Changes" (December 2003)
15. "Love is a Gift" (March 2004)
16. "Holding Fast" (June 2004)
17. "A Season of Hope" (September 2004)
18. "New Beginnings" (March/April 2005)
19. "From This Day On" (July 2005)
20. "Always There" (July 2005)

=== Special Editions ===
1. "A Holiday Memory" (November 2004) also published in UK as "Winter Memories" (November 2004)
2. "Amy's Journal" (December 2005)
3. "Beyond the Horizon" (April 2007)
4. "Winter's Gift" (October 2007)
5. "A Summer to Remember" (May 2008)

== Reception ==
Booklist called the first novel in the series, Coming Home, "unexceptional", recommending it to horse lovers drawn to the idea "that someone can work with troubled horses and have a normal life at the same time."
