= Maria del Mar =

Maria del Mar may refer to:

- Maria Del Mar (singer) (born c. 1966), Canadian rock singer, and occasional actress
- Maria del Mar (actress) (born 1964), Canadian television and film actress
- María del Mar Blanco (born 1974), Spanish politician
- Maria del Mar Bonet (born 1947), Spanish singer
- Maria del Mar Bonnin Palou (born 1990), Spanish cyclist
- María del Mar Feito (born 1975), Spanish field hockey player
- María del Mar Fernández, multiple people
- María del Mar Jover (born 1988), Spanish long jumper
- María Del Mar Olmedo Justicia (born 1983), Spanish Paralympic judoka
- María del Mar Rey (born 1968), Spanish volleyball player
- María del Mar Rodríguez Carnero (born 1975), Spanish singer
- María del Mar Sánchez (born 1979), Spanish pole vaulter
- María del Mar (TV series), a Venezuelan telenovela
