= Slasher (TV series) =

Canadian-American anthology television series

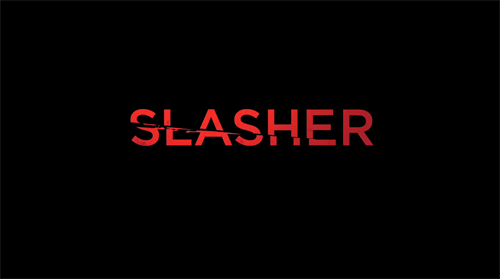
- Genre: Anthology; Horror; Slasher; Drama
- Created by: Aaron Martin
- Directed by: Craig David Wallace; Felipe Rodriguez; Adam MacDonald
- Starring: Steve Byers; Dean McDermott; Christopher Jacot; Erin Karpluk; Jim Watson; Paulino Nunes; Jo Vannicola; Paula Brancati; Salvatore Antonio; Lisa Berry; Gabriel Darku; Mercedes Morris; Patrice Goodman; Genevieve DeGraves; Sabrina Grdevich; Thom Allison; Jefferson Brown; Nataliya Rodina; Breton Lalama; Daniel Kash; Eric McCormack; Shaun Benson Season 1: Katie McGrath; Brandon Jay McLaren; Patrick Garrow; Mary Walsh; Enuka Okuma; Wendy Crewson; Season 2: Leslie Hope; Lovell Adams-Gray; Ty Olsson; Sebastian Pigott; Madison Cheeatow; Melinda Shankar; Kaitlyn Leeb; Rebecca Liddiard; Season 3: Ilan Muallem; Baraka Rahmani; Rosie Simon; Season 4: A.J. Simmons; Alex Ozerov; Jeananne Goossen; Maria del Mar; Rachael Crawford; Sydney Meyer; David Cronenberg; Neal Huff; Season 5: Sadie Laflamme-Snow; Clare McConnell; Brandon Oakes
- Composer: Shawn Pierce
- Countries of origin: Canada; United States
- Original language: English
- No. of seasons: 5
- No. of episodes: 40 (list of episodes)

Production
- Executive producers: Aaron Martín; Greg Phillips; Jonathan Ford; Christina Jennings; Scott Garvie; Ian Carpenter
- Producers: Erin Berry; Jay Bennett; Paige Haight
- Production locations: Ontario, Canada
- Cinematography: Nick Haight; Scott McClellan
- Editors: Erin Deck; J Deschamps
- Camera setup: Single-camera
- Running time: 46–53 minutes
- Production companies: Shaftesbury Films; Super Channel (season 1); TVA Group (season 2)

Original release
- Network: Chiller
- Release: March 4 – April 15, 2016
- Network: Netflix
- Release: October 17, 2017 – May 23, 2019
- Network: Shudder
- Release: August 12, 2021 – May 11, 2023

Related
- Hell Motel

Slasher is a Canadian-American horror anthology television series created by Aaron Martin. It premiered on Chiller on March 4, 2016, and on Super Channel on April 1, 2016. The licensing rights for the second season were acquired by Netflix in January 2017. The second season was released on October 17, 2017. On August 8, 2018, the series was renewed for a third season, which premiered on May 23, 2019. An eight-episode fourth season was ordered for Shudder, premiering on August 12, 2021. On February 10, 2022, the series was renewed for a fifth and final season, which premiered on April 6, 2023.

A sixth season entered development before being rebranded as a spin-off miniseries, Hell Motel, which premiered on June 17, 2025. In 2026, Hell Motel was renewed by Shudder for a second season in lieu of any further seasons of Slasher, titled Hell Motel: Murder at Red Mountain. As of May 2026, filming has completed.

== Premise ==
Each season is centered on a masked killer with an unknown motive for killing their victims. The first season, retroactively subtitled The Executioner, was co-produced by Chiller and Super Channel, and centered on a mysterious figure billed as the Executioner who terrorizes the fictional town of Waterbury, Canada. The second season, subtitled Guilty Party, follows a group of former summer camp counselors who return to their isolated campground in order to retrieve the body of a murder they committed, before being targeted, one by one, by an unknown killer. The third season, Solstice, is centered on a group of neighbors who are targeted during the summer solstice period due to their complicity in not saving a murder victim who was killed one year earlier in front of their apartment complex by the same killer, nicknamed the Druid. The fourth season, Flesh & Blood focuses on the wealthy yet dysfunctional Galloway family, but after the sudden death of the family's patriarch, the remaining family members are forced to compete in a series of twisted games in order to win the family's entire fortune, all the while being hunted by a masked killer called the Gentleman. The fifth season, Ripper takes place in 19th century Toronto, where a group of rich elites are hunted down by a serial killer wearing widow's weeds, coincidentally named the Widow.

== Seasons ==
Season	Title	Episodes	Originally released		
Season	Title	Episodes	First released	Last released	Network
1	The Executioner	8	March 4, 2016	April 15, 2016	Chiller
2	Guilty Party	8	October 17, 2017		Netflix
3	Solstice	8	May 23, 2019		Netflix
4	Flesh & Blood	8	August 12, 2021	September 16, 2021	Shudder
5	Ripper	8	April 6, 2023	May 11, 2023	Shudder

=== The Executioner (2016) ===
Sarah Bennett and her husband Dylan move back to the town of her birth, fictitious Waterbury, Canada, into her childhood home, where both of her parents were murdered on the Halloween of 1988. Her mother was pregnant with Sarah at the time of the killing before the police arrest the killer who was holding the newborn baby. Sarah's return to Waterbury is greeted with the start of a series of copycat murders, all appearing to be at the hands of "The Executioner."

=== Guilty Party (2017) ===
In the dead of winter, a group of former summer camp counselors return to the resort where they participated in the murder of Talvinder Gill, then hid her body. The body has vanished from its secret hiding spot. They are then trapped in the resort and, one by one, killed by a murderer in a parka.

=== Solstice (2019) ===
Kit Jennings, a sex and drug addict, is murdered by someone using a "Druid" costume in front of an apartment complex during the summer solstice and the neighbors don't help him. Exactly one year later, a person using the same costume emerges and starts murdering every person who carries any kind of complicity in Jennings' murder.

=== Flesh & Blood (2021) ===
Slasher: Flesh & Blood follows a wealthy but dysfunctional family gathering for a reunion on a secluded island. Their old wounds and competitive rivalries flare up when the family realizes a masked killer is on the island, intent on cruelly picking them off one by one.

=== Ripper (2023) ===
Slasher: Ripper takes place in 1904 (with flashbacks to 1892) – where there is a killer stalking the streets, but instead of targeting the poor and downtrodden like Jack the Ripper, the Widow is meting out justice against the rich and powerful. The only person standing in the way of this killer is a newly promoted detective, Kenneth Rijkers, whose ironclad belief in justice may wind up being yet another victim.

== Cast and characters ==
=== Recurring cast members ===
List indicators
- A green cell indicates that the actor has appeared in the majority of the season.
- A light blue cell indicates the actor has appeared in fewer than four episodes.
- A red cell indicates the actor has a supporting role, appearing in at least four episodes.
- A light gray cell indicates the actor has a smaller role in the season, before starring as a main cast member.
- A dark gray cell indicates the actor has not participated in the respective season.

Actor	Capacity and character per season				
Actor	The Executioner	Guilty Party	Solstice	Flesh & Blood	Ripper
Katie McGrath	Sarah Bennett				
Brandon Jay McLaren	Dylan Bennett				
Steve Byers	Cam Henry				Andrew May Jr.
Patrick Garrow	Tom Winston			Ray Craft	
Dean McDermott	Iain Vaughn	Alan Haight	Dan Olenski		
Christopher Jacot	Robin Turner	Antoine		Seamus Galloway	Terrence Crenshaw
Mary Walsh	Verna McBride				
Enuka Okuma	Lisa-Ann Follows				
Erin Karpluk	Heather Peterson		Kaili Greenberg		
Wendy Crewson	Brenda Merrit				
Leslie Hope		Judith Berry			
Lovell Adams-Gray		Peter Broome			
Jim Watson	Young Alan Henry	Noah Jenkins	Xander Lemmon		
Paulino Nunes		Mark Rankin	Frank Dixon		
Ty Olsson		Benny Ironside			
Jo Vannicola	Debbie	Renée	Amber Ciotti	Amber Ciotti	Enid Jenkins
Sebastian Pigott		Owen Turnbull			
Madison Cheeatow		Keira			
Melinda Shankar		Talvinder Gill			
Kaitlyn Leeb		Susan Lam			
Rebecca Liddiard		Andi Criss			
Paula Brancati	Jana Singer	Dawn Duguin	Violet Lickers	Christy Martin	Viviana Botticelli
Salvatore Antonio			Angel Lopez		Salomé
Lisa Berry			Det. Roberta Hanson		Dr. Melanda Israel
Gabriel Darku			Connor Rijkers		Det. Kenneth Rijkers
Mercedes Morris			Jen Rijkers		Shanika
Ilan Muallem			Joe Lickers		
Baraka Rahmani			Saadia Jalalzai		
Rosie Simon			Amy Chao		
Patrice Goodman			Justine Rijkers	Birgit Vogel	Prison Matron
Genevieve DeGraves			Cassidy Olensky		Margaret Mehar
A.J. Simmons				Vincent Galloway	
Alex Ozerov				Theo Galloway	
Jeananne Goossen				Dr. Persephone Trinh	
Maria del Mar				Annette Galloway	
Rachael Crawford				Grace Galloway	
Sabrina Grdevich	Nancy Vaughn			Florence Galloway	Venetia Botticelli
Sydney Meyer				Liv Vogel	
David Cronenberg				Spencer Galloway	
Thom Allison				Curator	Georges Rondeau
Jefferson Brown	Trent McBride	Gene	Wyatt Garvey	Merle	Horatio Dixon
Nataliya Rodina				Aphra Galloway	Daisy Zywiecki
Breton Lalama				O’Keeffe Craft	
Daniel Kash					Isaac Kashtinsky
Sadie Laflamme-Snow					Verdi Botticelli
Clare McConnell					Regina Simcoe
Brandon Oakes					Eddie Jacobs
Eric McCormack					Basil Garvey
Shaun Benson					Alistair Simcoe

=== The Executioner ===
==== Main ====
- Katie McGrath as Sarah Bennett, an art gallery owner who recently moved in to the house her parents were murdered in, in Waterbury, her place of birth.
- Brandon Jay McLaren as Dylan Bennett, Sarah's husband and editor-in-chief of the local newspaper, the Waterbury Bulletin.
- Steve Byers as Cam Henry, a member of Waterbury's police force.
- Patrick Garrow as Tom Winston, the original Executioner who murdered Sarah's parents in 1988 and who advises Sarah on the new Executioner's murders in the present day.
- Dean McDermott as Iain Vaughn, Waterbury's police chief.
- Christopher Jacot as Robin Turner, who, after the death of his husband, Justin, must deal with the business mess he left behind.
- Mary Walsh as Verna McBride, Sarah and Dylan's neighbor, who passed judgment almost immediately on the two.
- Enuka Okuma as Lisa Ann Follows, a former criminal justice lawyer, now a New York-based journalist and talk show host.
- Erin Karpluk as Heather Peterson. She is deeply haunted by and obsessed with her daughter Ariel's disappearance, which occurred 5 years earlier. Karpluk has equated Heather to the Log Lady, in that much like the Twin Peaks character, Heather appears to have a sixth sense about Waterbury's residents and their dark secrets.
- Wendy Crewson as Brenda Merrit, Sarah's maternal grandmother, who returns to Waterbury to look after Sarah and Dylan.

==== Recurring and guest ====
- Mayko Nguyen as Alison Sutherland, the publisher of the Waterbury Bulletin and Dylan's boss.
- Rob Stewart as Alan Henry, Cam's father, a church pastor, and the survivor/witness of Sarah's parents' murder. He has made occasional visits to Tom Winston in prison to provide religious counsel. In a flashback of the night Sarah's parents were murdered, young Alan is portrayed by Jim Watson.
- Dylan Taylor as Bryan Ingram, Sarah's father.
- Mark Ghanimé as Justin Faysal, who with husband Robin purchased several properties in Waterbury, including the storefront location that serves as Sarah's art gallery.
- Jessica Sipos as June Henry, Cam's wife, who works as an EMT and shows jealousy over Cam's friendship with Sarah.
- Victoria Snow as Sonja Edwards, Brenda's former childhood friend and her intended victim in a prom night 1968 incident.
- Jefferson Brown as Trent McBride, Verna's nephew, June Henry's former EMT partner, and an enthusiastic hunter and taxidermist.
- Booth Savage as Ronald Edwards, the Mayor of Waterbury.
- Hannah Endicott-Douglas as Ariel Peterson, Heather's missing daughter.
- Aidan Wojtak as Jake Vaughn, Ariel's younger son.
- Sabrina Grdevich as Nancy Vaughn, Chief Vaughn's wife.
- Michael Vincent Dagostino as Benny Peterson, Heather's late husband and Ariel's father.
- Suzannah Hoffman as Marjorie Travers, a prostitute and drug addict.
- Alysa King as Rachel Ingram, Sarah's mother.
- Anthony Lemke as Dylan's lawyer.
- Shawn Ahmed as Sharma, an officer in Waterbury's police force.

=== Guilty Party ===
==== Main ====
- Leslie Hope as Judith Berry, a commune member, who self-harms whilst recovering from drug addiction and depression.
- Lovell Adams-Gray as Peter Broome, a former counselor and Andi's ex-boyfriend. Five years ago, his affair with Talvinder resulted in his breakup with Andi.
- Jim Watson as Noah Jenkins, a former camp counselor. Five years ago, Talvinder manipulated him into doing things for her by pretending to have a romantic interest in him.
- Christopher Jacot as Antoine, one of the commune leaders, masseur and yoga instructor. He is Renee's legal husband, though he is gay.
- Paulino Nunes as Mark Rankin, a commune member and former lawyer. He joined the resort after nearly being killed by the father of the victim's murderer he successfully defended.
- Ty Olsson as Benny Ironside/Glenn Morgan, a commune member and former prisoner. He joined the resort after killing his former lover and assuming his identity.
- Jo Vannicola as Renée, one of the commune's leaders alongside her legal husband Antoine, though she is a lesbian.
- Sebastian Pigott as Owen "Wren" Turnbull, Judith's son and a former counselor. He had an unhealthy obsession with Talvinder.
- Madison Cheeatow as Keira, a commune member and former nurse, who joined the resort after accidentally killing a patient.
- Melinda Shankar as Talvinder Gill, a new, manipulative camp counselor. Her murder five years ago drives the events of Guilty Party. She played on the other counselors' kindness.
- Kaitlyn Leeb as Susan Lam, a former camp counselor, mother and wife. Five years ago, she despised Talvinder believing she was not genuine.
- Rebecca Liddiard as Andi Criss, a former camp counselor and Peter's ex-girlfriend. Five years ago, Peter had an affair with Talvinder, resulting in their breakup.
- Paula Brancati as Dawn Duguin, a former camp counselor. Five years ago, she and Talvinder were best friends until she stopped Dawn from having a relationship out of envy.

==== Recurring and guest ====
- Jefferson Brown as Gene, the outfitter and supply deliverer for the commune.
- Kyle Buchanan as Simon, Andi's current boyfriend. Her guilt about Talvinder's death causes tension in their relationship.
- Luke Humphrey as Glenn Morgan, a former drug dealer who was forced into a sexual relationship with Benny in prison. After expressing his hatred for him, he was murdered by Benny, who assumed his identity.
- Dean McDermott as Alan Haight, a man whose son died in a hit and run accident.
- Simu Liu as Luke, Susan's kind and oblivious husband.
- Sophia Walker as Megan McAllister, a hiker who approaches the commune in search of shelter from an imminent snowstorm.
- Rebecca Amzallag as Stephanie, a coworker of Mark who he had an affair with.
- Jon McLaren as Ryan, a former counselor. He and Dawn were mutually interested in each other romantically until Talvinder manipulated him into thinking Dawn's stepfather raped her.
- Kimberly-Sue Murray as Janice, Gene's girlfriend who comes looking for him at the commune.

=== Solstice ===
==== Main ====
- Salvatore Antonio as Angel H. Lopez, a gay activist who has an affair with Joe. He lives in apartment 106.
- Lisa Berry as Detective Roberta Hanson, the detective in charge of investigating the Druid murders.
- Paula Brancati as Violet Lickers, Joe's wife, a vlogger who considers her blog to be journalism, and seems to care more about her blog than about her husband. She and her husband live in apartment 208.
- Gabriel Darku as Connor Rijkers, the superintendent of the apartment building, Jen's brother and Amber's stepson, who has a crush on Saadia. He and his family live in apartment 202.
- Erin Karpluk as Kaili Greenberg, a biology teacher at the local high school who is a hopeless romantic. She lives in apartment 112.
- Dean McDermott as Dan F. Olenski, Cassidy's father, an alcoholic Neo-Nazi white supremacist. He and his daughter live in apartment 108.
- Mercedes Morris as Jen Rijkers, a student at the local high school, Connor's sister, Amber's stepdaughter and Saadia's best friend.
- Ilan Muallem as Joe Lickers, Violet's bisexual husband, who has an affair with Angel, but has a hard time choosing who he wants to be with.
- Paulino Nunes as Frank G. Dixon, a violent, domineering family man, Kate's husband, Erica's father. He appears to have connections to the mob, and part of his business involves stealing cars. He and his family live in apartment 212, but at the time of Kit's murder, lived in apartment 201.
- Baraka Rahmani as Saadia Jalalzai, a student at the local high school, a Muslim, and Jen's best friend. She has a reputation for being good. She and her parents live in apartment 102.
- Rosie Simon as Amy Chao, Xander's girlfriend, a professional gamer, who works beta testing video games. She is asexual. She and Xander live in apartment 216.
- Jo Vannicola as Amber Ciotti, the mentally ill, widowed stepmother of Connor and Jen. She became mentally ill after suffering a psychotic break after the suicide of her wife Justine.
- Jim Watson as Xander Lemmon, Amy's boyfriend, who runs the local coffee shop. He takes pride in his products, which are supposedly above average quality.

==== Recurring and guest ====
- Rebecca Amzallag as Beth, a math teacher at the local high school who is a friend of Kaili Greenberg.
- Robert Cormier as Kit Jennings, a bisexual, hypersexual drug addict who was murdered a year before the events of the series. The others who lived in the apartment building were complicit in his murder. He lived in apartment 104.
- Ishan Davé as Detective Pujit Singh, Detective Hanson's younger, less experienced partner, helping investigate the Druid murders.
- Genevieve DeGraves as Cassidy E. Olenski, Dan Olenski's daughter, who frequently engaged in casual sex with numerous people, including Kit Jennings.
- Tiio Horn as Coroner Lucie Cooper, the coroner for the local police department, who performs autopsies on the victims of the Druid.
- Jefferson Brown as Wyatt Garvey, Noelle Samuels' jealous ex-boyfriend.
- Patrice Goodman as Justine Rijkers, Connor and Jen's mother, Amber's wife, who was shunned by the residents of the apartment building following a post she made implying Kit deserved to die.
- Marie Ward as Kate Dixon, Frank's wife, who is abused by him.
- Dalal Badr as Farishta Jalalzai, Saadia's mother.
- Saad Siddiqui as Azlan Jalalzai, Saadia's father.
- Romy Weltman as Erica Dixon, Frank and Kate's daughter.
- Paniz Zade as Noelle Samuels, Kit Jennings' girlfriend, at the time of his murder.
- Landon Norris as Charlie, a student at the local high school who takes pleasure in antagonizing Jen and Saadia, the latter to the point of sexual harassment.
- Bill Moseley as Homeless Man, an aggressive man who antagonizes Angel and Xander.

=== Flesh & Blood ===
==== Main ====
- A.J. Simmons as Vincent Galloway, twin son of Florence who was abducted as a child. In flashbacks, young Vincent is portrayed by Judah Davidson.
- Alex Ozerov as Theo Galloway, twin son of Florence. In flashbacks, young Theo is portrayed by Joshua Reich.
- Chris Jacot as Seamus Galloway, the eldest son of Spencer, husband of Christy and adopted father of Aphra.
- Jeananne Goossen as Dr. Persephone Trinh, Spencer's physician.
- Maria del Mar as Annette Galloway, the first wife of Spencer and Seamus and Florence's mother.
- Paula Brancati as Christy Martin, the wife of Seamus and adopted mother of Aphra.
- Rachael Crawford as Grace Galloway, the second wife of Spencer and mother of his son Jayden.
- Sabrina Grdevich as Florence Galloway, the daughter of Spencer and mother of Theo, O’Keeffe and Vincent.
- Sydney Meyer as Livinia "Liv" Vogel, the daughter of Brigit. In flashbacks, young Liv is portrayed by Soreya Darra.
- Patrick Garrow as Ray Craft, an artist, O'Keefe's father.
- David Cronenberg as Spencer Galloway, the patriarch of the Galloway family who gathers his relatives on his secluded island so they can compete for his fortune.

==== Recurring and guest ====
- Breton Lalama as O’Keeffe Craft, the non-binary child of Florence.
- Corteon Moore as Jayden Galloway, the son of Spencer and his second wife Grace. In flashbacks, young Jayden is portrayed by Tau Sterling.
- Jefferson Brown as Merle, a sailor who escorts the Galloway family to the island.
- Nataliya Rodina as Aphra Galloway, the adopted daughter of Seamus and Christy who suffers from an eating disorder called pica.
- Patrice Goodman as Birgit Vogel, the housekeeper of the Galloway family and mother of Liv.

=== Ripper ===
==== Main ====
- Thom Allison as Georges Rondeau, a famous magician who travels through many cities.
- Salvatore Antonio as Salomé, a performer at the Queen's Chamber.
- Lisa Berry as Dr. Melanda Israel, a forensic doctor, who analyses the victim's bodies.
- Paula Brancati as Viviana Botticelli, the middle of the Botticelli sisters, who have feelings for Basil Garvey.
- Jefferson Brown as Horatio Dixon, a pimp on the street.
- Steve Byers as Andrew May Jr., a pastor whose father was falsely accused and executed for murder 12 years ago.
- Gabriel Darku as Detective Kenneth Rijkers, a young detective who tries to unveil the murders.
- Sabrina Grdevich as Venetia Botticelli, the eldest of the Botticelli sisters.
- Christopher Jacot as Terrence Crenshaw, the owner of the Queen's Chamber.
- Daniel Kash as Superintendent Isaac Kashtinsky, a corrupted detective, who is under the influence of Basil Garvey.
- Sadie Laflamme-Snow as Verdi Botticelli, the youngest of the Botticelli sisters, who just came to town right after the first murder happened.
- Clare McConnell as Regina Simcoe, the wife of an upper-class man who was murdered by the Widow.
- Mercedes Morris as Shanika, assistant of Georges Rondeau.
- Brandon Oakes as Eddie Jacobs, bodyguard and henchman of Basil Garvey.
- Jo Vannicola as Enid Jenkins, head editor of the newspaper in town.
- Eric McCormack as Basil Garvey, a charismatic and ruthless tycoon.

==== Recurring and guest ====
- Shaun Benson as Alistair Simcoe, a sadist and wealthy man, Regina's husband.
- Genevieve DeGraves as Margaret Mehar, a maid who was murdered brutally 12 years ago.
- Rob Stewart as Andrew May Sr., a pastor who was accused and hung for the murder of Mehar 12 years ago
- Sharron Matthews as Gladys, the housekeeper for Basil Garvey.
- Paul Braunstein as Officer Mullman, a corrupted policeman working for Rijkers.
- Nataliya Rodina as Daisy Zywiecki, a young girl who work on the street under Horatio Dixon's care.
- Saad Siddiqui as Jasper Cohen, former head editor of the newspaper in town.
- Patrice Goodman as Prison Matron, the warden at the police station.

== Production ==
=== Development ===
Slasher was created by Aaron Martin, who was inspired after his work on the first season of the medical series Saving Hope, specifically his writing of two episodes in which "people got chopped up." He wrote the first episode of the series as a spec script, aiming to offer it to prospective studios and show a writing style that was different from his previous work (e.g. Saving Hope, Degrassi: The Next Generation, and Being Erica). Though the script did not receive immediate interest, Shaftesbury Films optioned it in late 2014 with an eight-episode order and started pitching around to networks. Canadian premium network Super Channel ordered the project after showing interest in Slasher's fixed-end format. The now-defunct American network Chiller, which specializes in the horror thriller genre, joined production shortly after; Slasher became Chiller's first and only foray into original scripted series content.

In May 2017, Shaftesbury Films confirmed that the series would not return to Super Channel or Chiller for a second season. However, streaming service Netflix acquired the rights to the second season. The second season was released via Netflix on October 17, 2017.

In August 2018, it was announced that production commenced for the third season of Slasher. On October 23, 2018, Adam MacDonald was announced as the third season's director. On April 24, 2019, it was announced that Aaron Martin had stepped down as the showrunner and Ian Carpenter would serve as the primary showrunner and one of executive producers of the third season.

On November 12, 2020, the series was moved to Shudder for a fourth season. On February 10, 2022, Shudder renewed the series for a fifth and final season.

=== Writing ===
Slasher employs a season-long anthology format, with an overarching mystery storyline that will be resolved upon the season's conclusion. Series creator Aaron Martin was inspired by the format of American Horror Story, stating in 2016 that prospective subsequent seasons would retain the American Horror Story style of self-contained storylines; they would be used along with ideally as many actors from previous seasons as possible in new roles.

Martin has aimed to tell "a modern-day monster story" in Slasher, combining three of his favorite genres: the contemporary murder mystery (à la Broadchurch), the works of Agatha Christie, one of Martin's favorite crime writers, and the classic slasher films which he grew up with. In terms of the latter, Martin has specifically cited the influences of Halloween and It Follows in Slasher's use of a mysterious singular embodiment that is responsible for a series of killings. Not wanting to have the show's killer be "a mythological creature" (as he feels the killers in most slasher films do not have much mystery surrounding them), Martin also uses elements of the traditional whodunit in Slasher: the characters, many of whom have mysterious backgrounds and their own reasons for possibly being the killer are featured, explored, and eliminated from consideration, one by one either through death or the natural deductive process, until the "all too human" killer and their motivations are revealed.

=== Filming ===
Production on Slasher's 8-episode first season was announced on July 28, 2015, with filming taking place between then and October 2015. Three Northern Ontario municipalities — the cities of Sudbury and Sault Ste. Marie and the town of Parry Sound — would stand in for the show's fictitious location, the town of Waterbury. Unlike most television series that film their episodes in order, under the direction of Craig David Wallace, the series was shot as if it were a "super-sized" movie. Scenes from multiple episodes were filmed simultaneously, with the availability of locations and cast being factored in. The out-of-order schedule allowed the actors to acknowledge their characters' fates, especially those who had to film their death scenes one day but return later to film earlier scenes if necessary. As an example, Martin cited Mark Ghanimé's first day on set, when his character, Justin Faysal, was laid out in a casket for a scene early in Slasher's third episode. Justin's death, which took place in the second episode, would be filmed later on.

On May 1, 2017, Slasher began filming a second season in Orangeville, Ontario, Canada.

== Release ==
A first trailer for the series premiered on November 26, 2015. On May 25, 2016, the entire first season of Slasher became available to stream instantly on Netflix US. On October 17, 2017, the full second season of Slasher became available to stream on Netflix in various countries. The series airs in the United Kingdom on Pick, where the first season premiered on May 10, 2016 and the second season on May 1, 2018. On May 23, 2019, the full third season of Slasher became available to stream in various countries on Netflix. In April 2020, Netflix removed all three seasons of Slasher with no explanation or prior warning. In late June 2020, all three seasons of Slasher were re-added to Netflix.

== Reception ==
=== Critical response ===
Slasher has received positive reviews. For the first season, the review aggregator website Rotten Tomatoes reported an 80% approval rating with an average rating of 5/10 based on 5 reviews. Zap2it called the series "a whole lot of fun" and "something for everyone," praising the series' anthology nature, its cast of characters, storyline, plot twists, bloody violence, and even the series-within-the-series Falcon Husbandry (shown as a favorite of Robin and Justin's in Episode 2). Bloody Disgusting awarded the show four skulls out of five, praising Katie McGrath as a great "protagonist and possible final girl" and the series' decision to feature an adult cast, rather than teenagers, with well-developed characters and a "decidedly classic" presentation. On the occasion of Slasher's Super Channel premiere, The Globe and Mail's John Doyle, while remarking that it "is no masterpiece of horror, nor was it meant to be," called the show "very well-crafted," praising its "exceptional cast" and tight pacing, and noting fans of gory horror will appreciate its bloody scenes.

=== Awards and nominations ===
Year	Award	Category	Nominee(s)	Result	Ref.
2016	UBCP/ACTRA Awards	Best Actor	Brandon Jay McLaren	Nominated	
2017	5th Annual Canadian Screen Awards	Best TV Movie or Limited Series	Slasher	Nominated	
2017	5th Annual Canadian Screen Awards	Best Writing in a Dramatic Program or Limited Series	Aaron Martin	Nominated	
2017	5th Annual Canadian Screen Awards	Best Direction in a Dramatic Program or Limited Series	Craig David Wallace	Nominated	
2017	5th Annual Canadian Screen Awards	Best Performance by an Actor in a Leading Role in a Dramatic Program or Limited Series	Steve Byers	Nominated	
2017	5th Annual Canadian Screen Awards	Best Performance by an Actress in a Featured Supporting Role in a Dramatic Program or Series	Wendy Crewson	Won	

== Spin-off ==
A sixth season of Slasher entered production under Aaron Martin at Shudder before being rebranded as a spin-off miniseries set in the same universe, Hell Motel, which premiered on June 17, 2025. In 2026, Hell Motel was renewed by Shudder for a second season in lieu of any further seasons of Slasher, titled Hell Motel: Murder at Red Mountain. As of July 2026, filming has completed. The series stars Paula Brancati, Jim Watson, Shaun Benson, Genevieve DeGraves, Atticus Mitchell, Emmanuel Kabongo, Brynn Godenir, Michelle Nolden, Gray Powell, and Yanna McIntosh as the main cast, with Eric McCormack, Mike Taylor, Mercedes Morris, Daniel Kash, Christopher Jacot, and Lauren Lee Smith playing recurring roles. Season One of Hell Motel follows a group of true-crime fanatics who attend the opening weekend of a newly renovated motel, which was the site of a 30-year-old unsolved ritualistic mass murder, all while a Satanic serial killer, known as Baphomet, picks them off. In Season Two, Hell Motel: Murder at Red Mountain, Set at a mountain resort known for eliminating people’s inhibitions and amplifying their desires, the new season continues to reveal the chilling consequences of surrendering to our darkest impulses amidst the unique Cold River landscape. As guests and staff go missing without explanation and violent incidents increase, it becomes clear that Red Mountain has a long, horrific history for a reason and that no one is safe.
