= Patrice Goodman =

Canadian actress

Patrice Goodman is a Canadian actress. She is most noted for her starring role in the comedy television series Sunnyside, for which she and the other core cast collectively won the Canadian Screen Award for Best Performance in a Variety or Sketch Comedy Program or Series at the 4th Canadian Screen Awards in 2016.

== Career ==
Goodman had supporting or guest roles in the television series Platinum, This Is Wonderland, The Handmaid's Tale, The Umbrella Academy and Slasher, and the films Blues Brothers 2000, The Last Debate, Subconscious Password and Fire Serpent. In 2021 she was cast in a lead role in the family sitcom Overlord and the Underwoods.

== Filmography ==
=== Film ===
Year	Title	Role	Notes
1998	Blues Brothers 2000	Dancer	
2000	Turn It Up	Jane	
2003	How to Deal	Carla	
2016	Odd Squad: The Movie	Boss	
2018	Luba	Melanie	

=== Television ===
Year	Title	Role	Notes
1998	Ice	Camille	Television film
1998	The MAXimum Dimension	Samantha	Television film
1999	Twice in a Lifetime	Lauren	Episode: "Ashes to Ashes"
2000	The Last Debate	Roz Weisberg	Television film
2002	Doc	Martha Donnelly	Episode: "The Commercial"
2002, 2003	Odyssey 5	Cheryl Johnson	2 episodes
2003	Profoundly Normal	Supermarket Cashier	Television film
2003	Playmakers	Robin's Friend	Episode: "Halftime"
2003	Platinum	Gayle	6 episodes
2004	Show Me Yours	Andrea	Episode: "The Following Game"
2004	Wild Card	Nora Sayers	Episode: "Slam Dunk Funk"
2004	The Jane Show	Rush Dating Hostess	Episode: "Pilot"
2004	Masterminds	Girlfriend	Episode: "Hot Wheels"
2005	This Is Wonderland	Tonya	Episode #3.4
2006	The Buck Calder Experience	Maxine	Television film
2007	Fire Serpent	Billie	Television film
2009	Being Erica	Clerk	Episode: "Everything She Wants"
2011	Good Dog	Network Exec #1	Episode: "I Never Met a Phor I Didn't Use"
2011	Warehouse 13	Nurse	Episode: "Insatiable"
2013	Cracked	Elle Shipley	Episode: "Night Terrors"
2014	Midnight Masquerade	Briana	Television film
2015	A Perfect Christmas	Dr. Bowen	Television film
2015	Sunnyside	Various roles	13 episodes
2016	Suits	Ruth	Episode: "To Trouble"
2016	Conviction	Soraya	Episode: "Dropping Bombs"
2016	Kim's Convenience	Dr. Peterson	Episode: "Appa's Lamp"
2017	Incorporated	Dr. Hines	Episode: "Sweating the Assets"
2017	Stickman	Cathy	Television film
2017, 2019	Dino Dana	Riley's Mom	2 episodes
2018	Frankie Drake Mysteries	Cindy	Episode: "Ghosts"
2018	Imposters	Plainclothes Detective 1	Episode: "Andiamo"
2018	The Handmaid's Tale	Doctor #3	Episode: "Holly"
2018	Second Jen	Nun	Episode: "The Book of Jenesis"
2018	Believe Me: The Abduction of Lisa McVey	Det. Russell	Television film
2019	Romance Retreat	Catherine Fontes	Television film
2019	Ghostwriter	The Queen	Episode: "Ghost in Wonderland, Part 2"
2019–2024	The Umbrella Academy	Dot	7 episodes
2019–2023	Slasher	Birgit / Justine Rijkers / Prison Matron	12 episodes
2020	Run	Cherise	Episode: "Kiss"
2020	I Was Lorena Bobbitt	Lisa Kemler	Television film
2020	Condor	Pilates Instructor	Episode: "A Former KGB Man"
2020	Grand Army	Regina Wilton	Episode: "Spirit Day"
2020	The Expanse	Hasami Lead Scientist	Episode: "Exodus"
2021	Pretty Hard Cases	Principal Diana Fortin	Episode: "Bananans"
2021	Nurses	Susan Ashe	Episode: "Prima Facie"
2021–2022	Overlord and the Underwoods	Flower Underwood	20 episodes
2022	Good Sam	Monique Jenkins	Episode: "The Griffith Technique"
2022	In the Dark	Savannah Michaels	Episode: "Bail's in Your Court"
2023	'Twas the Text Before Christmas	Traci	Television film
2023	A Royal Date for Christmas	Meredith	Television film
2024	Operation Nutcracker	Hilary	Television film
2024	'Twas the Date Before Christmas	Shelly	Television film
2025	Doc	Connie Brady	Episode: "Man Plans"
2025	SurrealEstate	Dorothy Kamara	Episode: "Perchance to Dream"
2025	Brilliant Minds	Gloria	Episode: "The Pusher"
2025	A Christmas Cookbook	Elise	Television film
