= Christopher Jacot =

Canadian actor

- Occupation: Actor
- Years active: 1998–present

Christopher Jacot is a Canadian film, television and voice actor. He has appeared in 4 seasons of Slasher.

== Early life ==
Jacot attended Earl Haig Secondary School in the Claude Watson programme for drama with fellow actors Sarah Polley and Lani Billard.

== Career ==
Jacot has performed recurring and guest roles on various television series, including Degrassi: The Next Generation, Eureka, Slasher, and The Strain.

=== Voice work ===
Jacot has done a great deal of voice work, two of his most notable roles being Johnny Storm, the Human Torch, in the animated series Fantastic Four: World's Greatest Heroes and Maurice Vega in the video game Watch Dogs. He later worked with Ubisoft again in Watch Dogs 2, where he voiced Dus̆an Nemec, the main antagonist, and provided the voice of the character Topher in Total Drama Pahkitew Island.

== Filmography ==
=== Film ===
Year	Title	Role	Notes
2001	Get Over It	Peter Wong	
2002	The Bay of Love and Sorrows	Robert Allan "Silver" Brassaurd	
2003	Rescue Heroes: The Movie	Wayne (voice)	
2003	Word of Honor	Young CPL. Lawrence Cane	Television film
2004	Going the Distance	Nick	
2005	Hellraiser: Hellworld	Jake	Direct-to-video
2007	Battle in Seattle	Michael	
2008	Chaos Theory	Best Man	
2009	Spectacular!	Stavros Alexander	Television film
2009	Come Dance at My Wedding	Zach Callahan	Television film
2009	Killer Hair	Beau Radford	Television film
2013	Catch a Christmas Star	Carmine	Television film
2014	Aaliyah: The Princess of R&B	Ryan Nichols	Television film
2014	When Sparks Fly	Hank Lyons	Television film
2015	The Waiting Room	Derek	
2018	An Audience of Chairs		

=== Television ===
Year	Title	Role	Notes
2000	Canada: A People's History	Pierre Boucher	1 episodes
1999, 2000	Twice in a Lifetime	Julio, Young Ray Jericho	2 episodes
2000–01	The Famous Jett Jackson	Baxter Shaw	2 episodes
2001	MythQuest	Alex Bellows	13 episodes
2002	Relic Hunter	Blake	Episode: "Warlock of Nu Theta Phi"
2002	The Zack Files	Ricky Dallas	Episode: "Almost Famous Almost"
2002	Mutant X	Young Adam Kane	Episode: "Time Squared"
2003	Street Time	Phil Dorfman	Episode: "Lockdown"
2004	1-800-Missing	Patrick	Episode: "Judgement Day"
2004–05	Degrassi: The Next Generation	Matt Oleander	6 episodes
2005	This Is Wonderland	Michael	1 episode
2005, 2012	The Murdoch Mysteries	John Meredith, Russell Chisholm	2 episodes
2006	Battlestar Galactica	Ensign Brent "BB" Baxton	Episode: "Scar"
2006	Supernatural	Neil	Episode: "Children Shouldn't Play With Dead Things"
2006	Merlin's Apprentice	Graham	Miniseries
2006–10	Fantastic Four: World's Greatest Heroes	Johnny Storm / Human Torch (voice)	26 episodes
2007	Psych	Nick	Episode: "Meat Is Murder, But Murder Is Also Murder"
2007	Smallville	Ben Meyers	Episode: "Action"
2007–12	Eureka	Larry Haberman	23 episodes
2009	Knights of Bloodsteel	Adric	Miniseries
2011	White Collar	Teddy Eames	Episode: "Under the Radar"
2011	CSI: NY	Harvin Garrity	Episode: "Identity Crisis"
2011	The Troop	Declan Patrick	Episode: "It's in the Game"
2012	King	Otis	Episode: "Justice Calvin Faulkner"
2012	BeyWheelz	Sho Tenma (voice)	13 episodes
2012	Transporter: The Series	Ivon	Episode: "The Switch"
2013	Nikita	Baker	Episode: "Intersection"
2013	Bomb Girls	Floyd Barker	Episode: "Party Line"
2013	The Listener	Dan Goodwin	Episode: Blast from the Past"
2013	Hard Rock Medical	Roger	Episode: "Rock and a Hard Place"
2013	Beyblade: Shogun Steel	Shinobu Hiryuin (voice)	English dub; 6 episodes
2013	Beyblade: Metal Fusion	Shinobu Hiryuin (voice)	English dub; Episode: "The Legend and the Evil Combine"
2014	Total Drama: Pahkitew Island	Topher (voice)	8 episodes
2015	Hemlock Grove	Nate Lowenstein	Episode: "The House in the Woods"
2015–16	Rogue	Scott	5 episodes
2016	Reign	The Butcher	Episode: "Succession"
2016	The Strain	Braden	Episode: "Bad White"
2016	Slasher: The Executioner	Robin Turner	Main cast
2017	Slasher: Guilty Party	Antonie	Main cast
2017	Saving Hope	Jonathan	6 episodes
2018	Frankie Drake Mysteries	Clive Harper	Episode: "Once Burnt Twice Spied"
2019	Corn & Peg	Mr Hooferson	Episode: Firefighter Peg/Adventures in Horsesitting
2020	Slasher: Flesh & Blood	Seamus Galloway	Main cast
2023	Slasher: Ripper	Terrence Crenshaw	Main cast
2026	Air Crash Investigation	First Officer Peter Kowalczyk	Episode: “Deadly Charter”
2026	The Turminal List	Charlie Lowe	Episode: "Warrior In The Garden"

=== Video games ===
Year	Title	Role
2014	Watch Dogs	Maurice Vega
2016	Watch Dogs 2	Dušan Nemec
