= Alysa King =

Canadian actress

- Born: Milton, Ontario, Canada
- Occupation: Actress
- Years active: 2012–present

Alysa King is a Canadian actress best known for her role in Berkshire County.

== Career ==
King was a child model and actress, she did national commercials for companies such as K-mart and Chrysler. Her parents withdrew her from professional acting so she could concentrate on school, but she still continued to act in school plays and in local theatre productions. King returned to acting professionally after she completed her post-secondary education. King is a graduate of Sheridan College's theatre program, she has a Bachelor of Arts in Drama and English and a graduate degree in Education from Queen's University.

King has found success in the horror genre, her most notable roles being Kylie Winters in Berkshire County, Sandy in Bed of the Dead and Rachel Ingram on the television series Slasher.

== Filmography ==
=== Film ===
Year	Film	Role	Notes
2012	Consequences	Carrie	
2014	The Misfortune of Madeline Moody	Madeline Moody	Short Film
2014	Tormented (Berkshire County)	Kylie Winters	
2015	The Millennials	Sam	
2015	The Film Student Movie	Wardrobe stylist	
2015	Holy Hell	Amy Bonner	
2016	Bed of the Dead	Sandy	
2018	Prescription for Danger	Kellie	TV film

=== Television ===
Year	TV Show	Role	Notes
2012-2014	Motives & Murders: Cracking the Case	Brook Baker / Renée's Co-worker #2	2 Episodes
2014	Asset: The Webseries	Nadja Lazereva	14 Episodes
2015	Paranormal Witness	Deborah	1 Episode: Poppy's Revenge
2016	American Lawmen	Kate Warne	Episode: Pinkerton and the Race to Save Lincoln
2016	Slasher	Rachel Ingram	5 Episodes

== Awards and nominations ==
Year	Award	Category	Work	Result
2014	Blood in the Snow Canadian Film Festival	Best Actress	Berkshire County	Won
2014	HorrorQuest Film Festival	Best Actress	Berkshire County	Won
2016	Austin Revolution Film Festival	Best Actress	Holy Hell	Nominated
2016	FANtastic Horror Film Festival	Best Actress	Holy Hell	Nominated
2016	San Antonio Horrific Film Festival	Best Actress	Holy Hell	Nominated
