= V Wars =

2019 American science fiction horror streaming television series

- Genre: Science fiction; Horror; Thriller; Drama
- Based on: V Wars by Jonathan Maberry
- Starring: Ian Somerhalder; Adrian Holmes; Laura Vandervoort; Kimberly Sue-Murray; Sydney Meyer; Kandyse McClure; Michael Greyeyes; Jacky Lai; Kyle Breitkopf; Peter Outerbridge
- Theme music composer: Andrew Lockington
- Composer: Michael White
- Country of origin: United States
- Original language: English
- No. of seasons: 1
- No. of episodes: 10

Production
- Executive producers: William Laurin; Glenn Davis; Brad Turner; Eric Birnberg; Thomas Walden; James Gibb; Ian Somerhalder; Lydia Antonini; Matthew McCluggage; Paul Harb; Ted Adams; Jonathan Maberry
- Producer: Thomas Vencelides
- Cinematography: Craig Wright
- Editors: Geoff Ashenhurst; Paul Day; Dave Thompson; Paul Whitehead
- Camera setup: Single-camera
- Running time: 37–57 minutes
- Production companies: High Park Entertainment; IDW Entertainment; Marada Pictures

Original release
- Network: Netflix
- Release: December 5, 2019

V Wars is an American science fiction horror television series based on the anthology series of the same name and comic book by Jonathan Maberry. The series stars Ian Somerhalder, Adrian Holmes, Jacky Lai, Kyle Breitkopf, Peter Outerbridge, Kimberly-Sue Murray and Sydney Meyer. It premiered on Netflix on December 5, 2019. The series was canceled after one season, in March 2020.

== Synopsis ==
V Wars follows the story of the physician/scientist Dr. Luther Swann, and his best friend Michael Fayne, as they face the evolving crisis of a deadly outbreak that fractures society into opposing factions, potentially escalating to a future war between humans and vampires. The outbreak is caused by an ancient biological infectious agent, a prion, that turns humans into vampires, released from ice by climate change.

In the conflict, the vampire faction, called Blood, is opposed by the elements of the government, such as Calix Niklos (Peter Outerbridge) who plots with anti Blood senator Smythe (Ted Atherton).

== Cast and characters ==
=== Main ===
- Ian Somerhalder as Dr. Luther Swann
- Adrian Holmes as Michael Fayne
- Laura Vandervoort as Mila Dubov
- Kimberly-Sue Murray as Danika Dubov
- Sydney Meyer as Ava O'Malley
- Michael Greyeyes as Jimmy Saint
- Jacky Lai as Kaylee Vo
- Kyle Breitkopf as Desmond "Dez" Swann
- Peter Outerbridge as Calix Niklos
- Kandyse McClure as Claire O'Hagan

=== Recurring ===
- Emmanuel Kabongo as Jack Fields
- Jessica Harmon as Jess Swann
- Greg Bryk as Bobby
- Teddy Moynihan as Jergen Weber
- Ted Atherton as Elegabulus
- Jonathan Higgins as General Aldous May
- Samantha Liana Cole as Theresa
- Laura de Carteret as Senator Sasha Giroux
- Bo Martyn as Detective Elysse Chambers
- Nikki Reed as Rachel Swann

== Episodes ==
No.	Title	Directed by	Written by	Original release date
1	"Down with the Sickness"	Brad Turner	Glenn Davis & William Laurin	December 5, 2019
2	"Blood Brothers"	Brad Turner	Glenn Davis & William Laurin	December 5, 2019
3	"Because I Could Not Stop for Death"	T.J. Scott	Glenn Davis & William Laurin	December 5, 2019
4	"Bad as Me"	T.J. Scott	Glenn Davis & William Laurin	December 5, 2019
5	"Cold Cold Ground"	Kaare Andrews	Glenn Davis & William Laurin	December 5, 2019
6	"It's Not Enough to Have Lived"	Marita Grabiak	Glenn Davis & William Laurin	December 5, 2019
7	"The Night Is Darkening Round Me"	Bobby Roth	Glenn Davis & William Laurin	December 5, 2019
8	"Red Rain"	Brad Turner	Glenn Davis & William Laurin	December 5, 2019
9	"The Junkie Run of the Predator Gene"	Ian Somerhalder	Glenn Davis & William Laurin	December 5, 2019
10	"Bloody but Unbow'd"	Brad Turner	Glenn Davis & William Laurin	December 5, 2019

== Production ==
=== Development ===
On April 16, 2018, it was announced that Netflix had given the production a series order for a first season consisting of ten episodes. The series was created by William Laurin and Glenn Davis, who are credited as the showrunners and executive producers of the series. Additional executive producers were set to include Brad Turner, Eric Birnberg, Thomas Walden, David Ozer, Ted Adams and James Gibb.

Production companies involved with the series include High Park Entertainment and IDW Entertainment. Netflix canceled the series after one season, on March 30, 2020.

=== Casting ===
In April 2018, Ian Somerhalder was cast in the role of Dr. Luther Swann. In June 2018, Adrian Holmes, Jacky Lai and Peter Outerbridge joined the main cast. In July 2018, Laura Vandervoort, Kyle Breitkopf and Kimberly-Sue Murray were cast in the series.

=== Filming ===
Principal photography began in Sudbury and Cambridge, Ontario in the end of June 2018. Principal photography wrapped in Toronto, Ontario, Canada in October 2018.

== Releases ==
=== Anthology series ===
There have been four anthologies, edited by Jonathan Maberry and published by IDW Publishing, in the V Wars series. Notable authors who contributed short stories to the series include Maberry, Jennifer Brozek, Larry Correia, Keith R. A. DeCandido, John Everson, Gregory Frost, Nancy Holder, Jeff Mariotte, Joe McKinney, James A. Moore, Yvonne Navarro, Scott Nicholson, Weston Ochse, Jeremy Robinson, Scott Sigler, John Skipp, and Tim Waggoner.

- V Wars (May 2012, ISBN 978-1-61377-151-8)
- V Wars: Blood and Fire (July 2014, ISBN 978-1-63140-027-8)
- V Wars: Night Terrors (March 2015, ISBN 978-1-63140-272-2)
- V Wars: Shockwaves (August 2016, ISBN 978-1-63140-640-9)

=== Comic series ===
The V Wars comics series was released in 11 issues by IDW from April 2014 through March 2015. They have been collected in the following volumes:

- V Wars: Crimson Queen (October 2014, ISBN 978-1-63140-063-6)
- V Wars: All of Us Monsters (May 2015, ISBN 978-1-63140-255-5)

An omnibus volume containing all 11 issues was also released:

- V Wars: The Graphic Novel Collection (May 2019, ISBN 978-1-68405-536-4)

=== TV series ===
On November 19, 2019, the official trailer for the series was released by Netflix. The series was released on December 5, 2019.

== Reception ==
Critical reviews are mixed. On Rotten Tomatoes, the series holds a critic approval rating of 56%, with an average rating of 6.73/10, based on nine reviews. Isaac Feldberg at The Boston Globe enjoyed it, calling it "unabashedly silly...a fun, freaky B-movie stretched out to series’ length". The Sydney Morning Herald reviewer, Brad Newsome, was less kind in calling it a "a frustrating thing" that doesn't deliver on its promises. Andrew Dex at Starburst criticized the weak character development and mix of seemingly-unrelated side characters while also praising the growing strength of the series by the end of the season.

In her review for Film Inquiry, Stephanie Archer stated "the series left much to be desired" and that there was "an immediate disconnect with Dr. Swann, played by Somerhalder". Vincent Schilling of Indian Country Today, on the other hand, praised the casting of Somerhalder and Michael Greyeyes, stating he was "hooked from the beginning". He goes on to say that the "show is a blast". Dustin Rowles at Pajiba described the series as "very low-rent", "poorly written", and "humorless".

Mikel Zorilla of the Spanish-language web magazine Espinof criticized the series' lack of focus, saying it had potential but failed to do anything to stand out. WhatCulture described the series "a thrilling well-paced ride...[and] damn good fun that compels you to keep watching" despite "moments that temporarily draw focus from the plot and leave you scratching your head".
