= List of Slasher episodes =

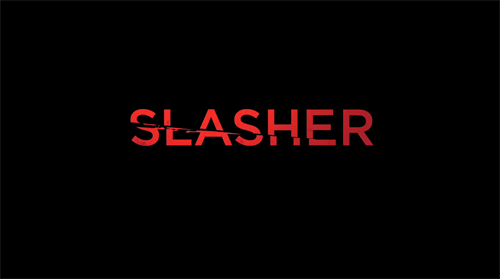
The logo for the TV series Slasher

Slasher is a Canadian-American horror anthology television series created by Aaron Martin that premiered on March 4, 2016, on Chiller. The series' licensing rights were purchased by Netflix in January 2017, and the following seasons were released exclusively via Netflix's web streaming service. The second season was released on October 17, 2017. In November 2020, the series was moved to Shudder for a fourth season. The fifth and final season aired on April 6, 2023, with a spin-off series set in the same universe, Hell Motel, premiering on June 17, 2025 as a miniseries before being renewed for a second season.

== Series overview ==
Season	Title	Episodes	Originally released		
Season	Title	Episodes	First released	Last released	Network
1	The Executioner	8	March 4, 2016	April 15, 2016	Chiller
2	Guilty Party	8	October 17, 2017		Netflix
3	Solstice	8	May 23, 2019		Netflix
4	Flesh & Blood	8	August 12, 2021	September 16, 2021	Shudder
5	Ripper	8	April 6, 2023	May 11, 2023	Shudder

== Episodes ==
=== Season 1: The Executioner (2016) ===
No. overall	No. in season	Title	Directed by	Written by	Original release date	US viewers (millions)
1	1	"An Eye for an Eye"	Craig David Wallace	Aaron Martin	March 4, 2016	0.120
Sarah returns to Waterbury with her husband and journalist Dylan Bennett to stay at a house bought from realtor Robin Turner. The house is the one where Sarah's parents, Bryan and Rachel Ingram, were murdered by Tom Winston in 1988 before her birth. Tom, concealing his identity with a medieval robe and leather hood, was dubbed "The Executioner". The second Executioner surfaces for the first time, chasing Sarah down her street. Following a suggestion from Tom after their first meeting, Sarah discovers a camcorder and illicit sex tapes buried in her parents' house, tapes that her neighbor Verna McBride had taken to her house. The Executioner ties down and dismembers Verna in her bedroom. During the second visit, Tom informs Sarah that the killer is targeting those who violate one of the seven deadly sins and that Verna's dismemberment was the biblical punishment for wrath.
2	2	"Digging Your Grave With Your Teeth"	Craig David Wallace	Aaron Martin	March 4, 2016	0.110
Sarah's grandmother, Brenda, arrives to stay with the couple until the killer is caught. While setting up her art gallery store, Sarah receives a package containing a severed human finger and a note. She then discovers the remains of Verna's husband, Peter, in the woods, where Verna murdered him after discovering his affair with Rachel on one of the sex tapes. Lured out into an alleyway, Robin is attacked by the Executioner before being rescued by a bystander. Police deputy Cam Henry realizes that Robin's husband, Justin, is the killer's next victim and attempts to report police chief Iain Vaughn at the house party, but Justin dies after ingesting cocaine laced with rat poison, serving as the punishment for his gluttony. The police arrest Heather Peterson, who verbally threatened Justin and Robin earlier, under suspicion of the current murders.
3	3	"Like as Fire Eateth Up and Burneth Wood"	Craig David Wallace	Aaron Martin	March 11, 2016	0.067
Robin discovers from a lawyer that Justin had bribed money from his clients and stolen their home from a family who died from oxygen toxicity from the house's propane heater after Justin moved them to another house without electricity or heating. Sarah and Brenda swerve off the road to avoid a pickup truck. As they walk back to town, Brenda confesses to her role in Ada Pavlovik's accident as a teen, when she attempted to drop a cinder block on her former best friend after her brief relationship with the mayor, Ronald Edwards. Fearing for her grandmother's safety, Sarah is separated from Brenda. Brenda attempts to kill the Executioner, but he ties her to a cinder block and tosses it into a lake. Brenda's drowning, the punishment for her envy, prompts the police to release Heather from custody.
4	4	"As Water is Corrupted Unless It Moves"	Craig David Wallace	Aaron Martin	March 18, 2016	0.067
The police verify the truck that ran off Sarah and Brenda belonged to Verna's nephew Trent. Trent is chased into a snake pit in the woods and is killed by the Executioner as punishment for his sloth. Dylan interviews Tom in prison at the request of his boss, Alison Sutherland, and journalist Lisa-Ann Follows. Tom provides evidence to Dylan that suggests he has had a greater interest in Tom than he let on to Sarah. Cam's wife, June, confides to Sarah that she and Trent had an affair while EMT partners and explains Trent's encounter with Ariel Peterson, Heather's daughter who disappeared five years ago. Sarah discovers June was also involved with Trent before Ariel's disappearance. June is abducted at the church by the Executioner. She awakens in a cornfield naked, paralyzed with lidocaine, attached to an IV, and covered in honey, which attracts animals that eat her alive.
5	5	"Ill-Gotten Gains"	Craig David Wallace	Aaron Martin	March 25, 2016	0.053
Cam and Sarah argue over suspicions about the killer. Alison records her requested on-air interview with the Executioner, who agrees to its airing on television. At the bar, Alison confides to Lisa-Ann that she fabricated evidence tying Benny Peterson to his daughter's disappearance until the town held him responsible for the incident, driving him to suicide. Sarah and Robin believe Cam's father and local pastor Alan is the killer. The next day, Alison is abducted by the Executioner and decapitated for her greed; her head is later found in the local restaurant's deep fryer. After acquiring the digital files of her parents' remaining sex tapes from Ronald, Sarah discovers that one of the videos features a young Tom Winston. Meanwhile, Vaughn heads home to his basement, where he conceals Ariel and her son Jake.
6	6	"The One Who Sows His Own Flesh"	Craig David Wallace	Aaron Martin	April 1, 2016	0.076
Five years earlier, Vaughn abducts Ariel after June and Trent left her behind on the road and rapes her. After suspecting Sarah and Cam's attempts to interrogate Marjorie Travers about Ariel's whereabouts, Vaughn kills Marjorie in her apartment. He then captures Sarah in his car, where Sarah reveals Alison's fraud and Marjorie's deception. Vaughn takes her to a junkyard and attempts to kill her and make it appear like the Executioner has killed her for her pride — the punishment being to be "broken on a wheel" — but Sarah escapes, exposing Vaughn's sin of lust. Enraged, he attempts to punish himself by self-immolation along with Ariel and Jake but spares them until the police arrive and reunite them with Heather. Tom insists that he is Sarah's birth father until she demands his reason for murdering Bryan and Rachel. Meanwhile, Vaughn escapes to a secluded lakeside shack where the Executioner knocks him out and traps him in a crematorium, where he is burned alive.
7	7	"In the Pride of His Face"	Craig David Wallace	Aaron Martin	April 8, 2016	0.077
Tom's backstory before emerging as the Executioner is unveiled. As a former town pastor, he was tricked by Bryan and Alan into recording his intimacy with Rachel for one of her sex tapes. Enraged by the couple's deceit, Tom murders Bryan and scars Alan. Rachel pleads with him to spare Sarah, saying she is his daughter; he cuts the baby out of her womb and kills Rachel. In the present, Sarah confronts Dylan, who made a website of the Executioner's murder of her parents at his affair with Lisa-Ann. Tom escapes from prison and takes Sarah with him to protect her, as they are the Executioner's next victims—both committed their sins of pride. In the woods, the killer captures both of them, and they awake inside a sawmill. The Executioner drags Sarah into a running buzzsaw but Tom pleads with the killer to punish him instead, before plunging himself into the saw to his death. At his house, Cam places a piece of Tom's prison jumpsuit in a box with the other evidence pieces of the victims, revealing him to be the Executioner.
8	8	"Soon Your Own Eyes Will See"	Craig David Wallace	Aaron Martin	April 15, 2016	0.086
When Alan finds Cam's box, he confronts his son for being the killer. Cam murders him at the church and places the box at Sarah and Dylan's house to frame the latter as the Executioner. Sarah finds a photo of a sketch Cam drew that resembles the killer's drawings and sneaks into his house to find his Executioner paraphernalia. She lures Cam outside Robin's Halloween house party and stabs him, but he takes the knife and stabs Robin, who has shown up to investigate the commotion. Sarah escapes as Cam pursues her until Dylan, released by his lawyer, arrives and helps her immobilize Cam. Sarah stabs Cam repeatedly before slitting his throat. Four weeks later, a reconciled Sarah and Dylan sell the house and leave Waterbury. Robin shows the property to a family whose young daughter snaps the neck of a stray cat in the yard.

=== Season 2: Guilty Party (2017) ===
No. overall	No. in season	Title	Directed by	Written by	Original release date
9	1	"Six Feet Under"	Felipe Rodriguez	Aaron Martin	October 17, 2017
Former summer camp counselors Peter Broome, Andi Criss, Dawn Duguin, Noah Jenkins and Susan Lam return to Camp Motega, now renovated as a ski resort owned by a commune led by Antoine and Renee, five years after they murdered fellow camp counselor Talvinder Gill. When the group goes to where they concealed the body, they find it has disappeared. Meanwhile, a figure in a hooded parka and a ski mask murders the commune's supply outfitter, Gene, with a chainsaw inside the sauna. The figure then targets Andi, who finds Talvinder's decomposed corpse suspended from nearby trees, and knocks her out. Peter hears her screams and arrives to find the killer tying Andi to the ground and slitting her throat. After Peter informs the group of her death, the former counselors find a warning written in blood on the wall.
10	2	"Between Good and Evil"	Felipe Rodriguez	Jana Sinyor	October 17, 2017
When Antoine and Renee find a snowman decked with Gene's entrails outside the sauna, the two groups decide to drive to his shop to call for help but find all of the gas from their snowmobiles has been siphoned out. At their cabin, the former counselors are horrified after receiving a box containing Gene's clothes. Susan finds that the phone lines have been cut and informs the commune, who are now suspicious of the counselors. When they discover Dawn brought her gun for protection, a conflict between the two groups ensues, and the commune evicts the counselors to their cabin. After Dawn blames Susan for instigating the scheme against Talvinder, Susan leaves and is captured by the killer, who gouges her eyes out before snapping her neck. Her corpse is later found outside the resort house by commune members Mark and Keira.
11	3	"Saint Sebastian"	Felipe Rodriguez	James Hurst	October 17, 2017
The counselors deny Antoine's accusations about Susan's death until he confronts them about the disappearance of Talvinder. Antoine reveals to Renee that he found Talvinder's body the previous summer while foraging for mushrooms in the woods. Renee convinces him to turn over the body to the police when they can. She hikes with Peter, Dawn, Mark and the commune's cook, Glenn, to Gene's shop for help and discovers their vehicles are inoperable and the phone does not work. Back at the camp, when Antoine returns to the shed to dispose of Talvinder's corpse, he is eviscerated with a ground auger by the killer. Upon returning, Renee sees a chunk of his flesh in the pan that Glenn prepped.
12	4	"Night of Hunters"	Felipe Rodriguez	Story by : Aaron Martin; Teleplay by : Naledi Jackson	October 17, 2017
After everyone discovers Antoine's death, they tackle a person with a similar brown parka to the killer's. She turns out to be Megan, a hiker who is on a memorial trek for her friend who died of leukemia. The group takes Megan to the resort house to question her. Noah, who is now suspicious of Glenn, confronts him about his identity after finding a different name on a prescription label. When Glenn threatens him, Noah escapes through a window into the storm. He stumbles into a broken-down RV and opens a freezer to find a body but is knocked out by Glenn, who turns out to be Benny Ironside, a serial rapist who killed the real Glenn Morgan. At the house, the other survivors lay their suspicions on Dawn after Megan dies from ingesting white baneberries in the soup bowl Dawn gave her. Meanwhile, Benny drags Noah to an abandoned school bus and rapes him.
13	5	"Out of the Frying Pan"	Felipe Rodriguez	Lucie Pagé	October 17, 2017
Peter, Dawn, Mark and Keira search for Noah after finding out the thug's identity. Noah, after Benny finishes raping him, sets the school bus on fire to escape and reunites with Peter and the others. Benny, who escapes the fire unharmed, attacks Renee and commune member Judith inside the resort house until Renee shoots him. The others restrain him in the warehouse to interrogate Benny, who pleads innocence for the other attacks. They decide to use Benny to lure the killer, but after they leave the warehouse, a grief-stricken Renee tortures the thug, accusing him of Antoine's murder. When he confesses to her in distress to end the torture, she slits his throat. Noah enters the warehouse to see Benny's body, and the killer throws a gas can that lights him on fire. The next morning, Peter and Keira find him outside with Talvinder's body.
14	6	"Drone"	Felipe Rodriguez	Floyd Kane	October 17, 2017
Noah, still alive, is carried back to the resort house by Peter and Keira while Dawn steps into a bear trap outside, injuring her leg. After the counselors admit their incident to Keira, Mark accuses the remaining survivors of being the killer and demands their respective backstories. When Mark tries to interrogate Peter, Mark's indictments escalate his heated dispute among the others as Noah dies. After the argument, Renee asks for Mark's help to uncover the aftermath of Talvinder's death. Mark guards the outside of the old counselor cabin while Renee searches through a box and acquires the file of Owen Turnbull, a former camp counselor. The killer arrives and knocks Mark unconscious as Renee runs, but the killer takes Dawn's gun and shoots her down. The killer then takes the file from her before mutilating her with the snowmobile.
15	7	"Dawn of the Dead"	Felipe Rodriguez	Amanda Fahey	October 17, 2017
Peter and Keira find Mark, who recovers from his unconsciousness after the killer murders Renee. When Mark carries her corpse to the warehouse, he finds Peter's photo in her jacket and suspects him of being the killer. At night, Mark spikes Peter's beer with ketamine and locks him out of the cabin despite Keira's objections. Peter stumbles through the woods and enters a silo to find pieces of the killer's victims and a mannequin hanging from a noose that is reminiscent of the suicide of Owen Turnbull, who was a suspect in Talvinder's death after the former counselors murdered her. He realizes the killer is targeting those complicit in Owen's death. He rushes back to the resort, but Mark knocks him out before he can explain his story to Dawn. Dawn and Keira try to convince Mark that Peter was telling the truth to reveal the killer's identity. Mark notices that Judith is not in her room and is killed after finding her outside.
16	8	"The Past is Never Dead"	Felipe Rodriguez	Aaron Martin	October 17, 2017
The survivors doubt Judith's story after she returns to the house, claiming that she killed Mark in self-defense. Dawn is accompanied by Gene's girlfriend, Janice, as she drives to town to take her to the hospital and call the police. Peter finds Keira unconscious from the propane heater. When Peter enters Judith's room, he finds the letters received from Owen before his suicide after Dawn framed him for the incident and that Judith, who is Owen's mother, was the real killer. As Peter attempts to escape with Keira, he runs into Judith at the silo after she kills Janice and shoots Dawn in the forest. Peter is forced to hang himself to spare Keira as Judith escapes. Dawn is rescued by two hunters and decides to turn herself in. While accompanied by Keira to the police station, Judith watches and vows to kill Dawn once she is released.

=== Season 3: Solstice (2019) ===
No. overall	No. in season	Title	Directed by	Written by	Original release date
17	1	"6am to 9am"	Adam MacDonald	Aaron Martin	May 23, 2019
The residents of the Clayborne apartment building are equally complicit in the death of tenant Kit Jennings, who, after attending a summer solstice party, was chased by "The Druid" — a figure in a hooded costume and neon-lit mask. On the first anniversary of the incident, the Druid resurfaces and beheads resident Frank Dixon, who was the lone witness to the attack on Kit. Police detectives Roberta Hanson, who also investigated Kit's murder, and Pujit Singh inspect Frank's murder. The crime scene is popularized on an exploitive blog website run by resident Violet Lickers, whose inactivity has caused her relationship with her husband Joe to become distant, leading him to secretly have an affair with fellow resident Angel Lopez. At school, another resident, Cassidy Olenski, is killed inside the girls' washroom by the Druid, who submerges her head in a toilet with hydrochloric acid, severely corroding her face.
18	2	"9am to 12pm"	Adam MacDonald	Lucie Pagé	May 23, 2019
Angel recalls his intentions against Kit at the solstice party, when Angel spiked Kit's vodka bottle to expose his lecherous actions to Cassidy, whom Kit had cheated on him with. After recovering in the hospital from a run-in with a vagrant, Angel berates Violet for scandalizing the other residents on her website. Upon returning to their respective apartments, Angel discovers that someone ransacked his apartment whilst he was away. At the same time, Violet receives a video of his earlier recorded private sex video with her husband. Her husband confronts Angel, who denies sending it. Meanwhile, the Druid sneaks into the coffee shop and attacks the owner, Xander Lemmon, inside the kitchen before shoving a glass coffee bean dispenser into his mouth and pouring boiling water down his throat.
19	3	"12pm to 3pm"	Adam MacDonald	Duana Taha	May 23, 2019
Jen Rijkers learns from her landlord brother, Connor, about the killer's recent attack from Violet's website and the suicide of their mother, Justine, shortly after Kit's murder. This happened after Justine posted a scathing rant about Kit's death that went viral, causing the public to turn on her, the children, and her wife, Amber Ciotti, who became mentally unstable following Justine's death. After completing her exams before the semester break, Jen is attacked by the Druid, who chases her outside the school parking lot with an axe until her best friend and tenant, Saadia Jalalzai, intervenes. Kaili Greenberg's perspective of her initial encounter with Kit divulges her unsuccessful attempts to explain his inactivity to the other tenants at their first meeting. After he left the solstice party on drugs, she declined to give him a ride back to the building. The Druid then abducts the teacher inside her car and straps her to a countertop in the school's biology lab, where the killer disembowels her alive.
20	4	"3pm to 6pm"	Adam MacDonald	Ian Carpenter	May 23, 2019
Hanson arrives at the Clayborne apartments to interrogate the remaining tenants, where Cassidy's father, Dan, demands his daughter's whereabouts. When Xander's body is found at the gaming hub by his girlfriend, Amy Chao, Hanson questions her about his involvement on the night of the first Druid attack. Xander snuck inside Kit's apartment upon discovering Amy's purported intimacy with Kit and took his key, making Kit unable to retreat into his apartment as the killer chased him. Confronting his girlfriend to accuse her of cheating on him, Xander's texts distracted Amy while driving back to the building, causing her to accidentally run over and kill Kit. Meanwhile, Hanson finds Cassidy's corpse in an air vent in the girls' washroom at the school. After she attempts to commit suicide inside her apartment, the Druid kills Amy by stabbing her in the head with a power drill.
21	5	"6pm to 9pm"	Adam MacDonald	Matt MacLennan	May 23, 2019
Violet has a standoff with Hanson, who warns her on her blog website that the killer will target her next. Afraid for his wife's safety, Joe convinces Violet to leave town with him while dealing with his affair with Angel. Hanson and Singh investigate the murder of Noelle Samuels, who was dating Kit at the time of his murder. While looking through the photos before The Druid's first attack, they discover the motives of Noelle's ex-boyfriend Wyatt. He stalked Kit and Noelle at the party and was The Druid who attacked the former and killed Noelle. Meanwhile, Angel kicks Joe out of his apartment after Violet records her sex video with her husband and sends it to his email as retaliation. Joe runs back to their apartment to confront his wife and is confronted by the killer, who captures and murders him and Violet. At the same time, Hanson and Singh arrive at Wyatt's apartment to arrest him for the crimes after he proudly confesses to being the Druid.
22	6	"9pm to 12am"	Adam MacDonald	JP Larocque	May 23, 2019
At the police station, Dan is informed of his daughter's death while Hanson interrogates Wyatt, who claims that he didn't murder the other tenants who were complicit in Kit's death. After arriving at the summer solstice party, Saadia becomes anxious and decides to leave. She recounts her past to Connor of being the lone survivor during a civil war in Afghanistan after her grandparents and relatives were executed by the military. Meanwhile, Charlie, a student who constantly bullied Jen and Saadia, is killed by the Druid inside the girls' washroom. While reviewing the previous crime scenes, Hanson deduces that the current murders are devious and done on purpose and may not be connected to Kit's murder. Back at the apartment building, the Druid, who has been manipulating the other residents into their deaths, lures Dan and Angel into the basement during their confrontation and releases a gas from the vent that knocks them unconscious. Angel and Dan later awaken with their faces glued together.
23	7	"Midnight to 3am"	Adam MacDonald	Ian Carpenter	May 23, 2019
In the basement, Dan and Angel break free from each other after Dan rips off the skin of Angel's cheek. Hanson and Singh return to the building to reinvestigate and find the Druid. While trying to evacuate the tenants, Singh is dragged into Xander and Amy's apartment and murdered by the Druid, who lacerates his face with an exposed moving blender blade. Meanwhile, Dan picks the lock of the hatch leading into the building's boiler room and finds the mutilated corpses of Amy, Joe, Violet and Singh. Deciding to sleep at the Rijkers' apartment, Saadia begins to question the behavior of Jen's family and the siblings' hostility against the other tenants who have died. Unable to contact Singh, Hanson finds a blood trail in the hallway with luminol and follows it directly to the boiler room. Before she can enter, she is attacked by the Druid, revealed to be Connor, who bludgeons her to death with his axe as Dan witnesses him dragging her corpse inside.
24	8	"3am to 6am"	Adam MacDonald	Ian Carpenter	May 23, 2019
While Connor disposes of the corpses in the boiler room, the furnace pushes its smell throughout the building, causing Saadia to realize that Connor is the killer. Jen reveals that she and Connor are both the Druid to avenge their mother's death. During the revelation, Jen kills Amber. Meanwhile, Angel and Dan attack Connor in the boiler room, and Angel kills Connor by restraining him in the open furnace, burning him alive — but also fatally burning both of his arms in the process by accident. Saadia fights off Jen in the basement and attempts to escape the building with Dan. Jen catches up and tries to kill them, but Saadia knocks Jen down with a fire extinguisher, causing her to fatal stab herself with her own blade. As Jen dies, Saadia confesses that she instigated the harassment as the first user who reposted Justine's message. Saadia and Dan exit the building the next morning and are greeted by two guests from the party, who mistake their appearances as costumes.

=== Season 4: Flesh & Blood (2021) ===
No. overall	No. in season	Title	Directed by	Written by	Original release date
25	1	"Thicker Than Water"	Adam MacDonald	Aaron Martin	August 12, 2021
Every year, the strained members of the Galloway family participate in a lethal competition set by patriarch and business magnate Spencer for his fortune. The contest abruptly ends following the disappearance of Vincent, one of the twin sons of Spencer's daughter Florence. Twenty-five years later, after being diagnosed with stage four lung cancer, Spencer gathers the remainder of the family along with his second wife, Grace, and their son, Jayden, for a reunion to recommence the games. Upon their arrival at his manor on a secluded island, the Gentleman, a plague masked murderer, kills the Galloways' boatman, Merle, inside his boathouse. The inheritance feud within the family reignites after Spencer informs them of his diagnosis at dinner. During his assisted suicide, the Gentleman kills Spencer by injecting hydrofluoric acid into his IV. While the family prepares for the first challenge, they discover that Vincent has returned after being kidnapped years ago.
26	2	"The Sins Of The Father"	Adam MacDonald	Ian Carpenter	August 12, 2021
In the aftermath of Spencer's death, the Galloways proceed to their first challenge. During the game, Spencer's eldest son, Seamus, tricks Jayden into falling into a spike strip, eliminating him from the competition. The recent tension between the half-brothers is revealed: Spencer blackmailed Jayden to obtain Seamus's business position in exchange for adoption funds for Seamus's foster daughter, Aphra. While treating his wounds, Jayden goes to the Galloways' safe room with his mother and Seamus' wife, Christy, to gather more medical supplies. The three encounter the Gentleman, who chases after them into the woods. Jayden is captured by the killer while Christy runs back to the house to warn the others. Grace finds Jayden in the shed with his limbs tied to four hydraulic winches. The family appears and attempts to help Grace save her son, but the winches activate and tear Jayden's limbs apart, killing him.
27	3	"In Trust"	Adam MacDonald	JP Larocque	August 19, 2021
Spencer's therapist, Dr. Persephone Trinh, who is running the competition for his will, insists the Galloways must continue to the next challenge despite Jayden's death. Enraged by her father's extortion of his game for the inheritance, Florence chases Trinh through the woods, where Trinh is pushed into the wood chipper and mutilated. Despite this, Spencer's tape directs them to the next challenge in the basement, which Seamus eventually loses. His story reveals his father's disapproval of his homosexuality. To win the approval of his father, Seamus impregnated the Galloways' housekeeper, Birgit Vogel. When Spencer discovered this, he forced Birgit and Seamus to cut ties and gave her money to raise their daughter, Liv. In the present, Seamus's loyalty to the family damages his marriage with Christy. Later, the Gentleman impales Seamus in the head with a fire poker through the house's secret passageway.
28	4	"Upstairs Downstairs"	Adam MacDonald	Ian Carpenter	August 26, 2021
Liv, having withdrawn from the next challenge, wanders outside to find the Galloway's rowboat broken by the Gentleman, who then attacks her. She escapes and informs the other family members, then decides to continue Spencer's competition in his honor. Birgit listens to Florence's discussion with her family through the passageway and discovers they still suspect Liv as the Gentleman and plot to kill her. She runs back to their room to warn her daughter and attempt an escape. As Birgit sings a lullaby to Liv, Vincent remembers the song from the day he was taken away and later recognizes Birgit as one of his abductors. Birgit admits she staged the kidnapping to acquire money and escape from Spencer with Liv. When the rest of his family confronts her, Vincent's twin brother, Theo, intervenes and helps the two escape. As they make it to the dock, the Gentleman abducts Birgit and traps her at the shore the next morning, where the killer buries her alive.
29	5	"Family Ties"	Adam MacDonald	Lucie Page	September 2, 2021
Florence's past as a failing artist is shown as she struggles to cope with Vincent's previous disappearance. She blamed Theo for the incident and emotionally mistreated him to create inspired art, which disgusted Spencer. In the present, the third challenge instructs the Galloways to compete in a hunting game, with the last two players taking shelter in the safe room. Florence and her youngest child, O'Keefe, succeed, but as they enter the bunker, it is revealed to be a death trap set by Spencer to test one's will to live for his inheritance. The bunker seals shut as the vents release asphyxiant gas. With only one breathing mask to share, Florence uses up the last of the oxygen tank for herself and leaves O'Keefe to suffocate just before the others arrive. Enraged by Florence's selfish actions, Theo and Vincent restrain her to one of her crafted art sculptures and leave her outside to die.
30	6	"Face Time"	Adam MacDonald	Ian Carpenter	September 9, 2021
Christy finds Aphra torturing Florence and blaming her for killing Seamus until Christy stops her. Before she can free Florence, the Gentleman reappears and chases her and Aphra into the forest after killing Florence, forcing them to hide in the bunker to escape. Christy expresses concerns about Aphra, recalling her mental behavior since arriving and how her attachment to Seamus strained their relationship. The next morning, Christy browses through Aphra's phone and discovers photos Aphra took with all the corpses. Christy finds one of her old video files, revealing that Aphra is an adult prostitute from Moldova posing as a 13-year-old. She realizes Aphra manipulated the entire family to gain access to their fortune. When Christy confronts Aphra, the latter viciously attacks her, severely disfiguring her by biting her face. Traumatized by the revelation and in immense pain from her mutilation, Christy returns to the house and begs the family to kill her out of mercy. Grace obliges, shooting her in the head. Meanwhile, Aphra is found by the Gentleman, who takes her into the woods to kill her.
31	7	"Goldfinger"	Adam MacDonald	Sabrina Sherif	September 16, 2021
Vincent informs the others of Aphra's death after he finds her bisected corpse suspended from a tree. Spencer's video informs the remaining members that each of them will be locked in a separate chamber in the basement and gain access to his fortune through a series of puzzles. Knowing that each challenge increases their chances of being the killer's next target, Liv, Theo and Vincent decide not to participate, but Grace intends to continue the game. She is revealed to have seduced Spencer for his fortune and become his wife after euthanizing his cancer-affected wife Annette while working as her personal nurse. Despite completing the challenge herself and winning, the Gentleman appears in the study and burns Grace alive with molten gold before the others can save her. Theo, Vincent, and Liv use the shortcut to the bunker and lure the Gentleman into the house, defeating him. They unmask the killer, who turns out to be Dr. Trinh.
32	8	"Kindred"	Adam MacDonald	Ian Carpenter	September 16, 2021
Trinh, having faked her wood chipper death using Merle's corpse, reveals that Spencer hired her to kill anyone in his family as part of his game to find one sole heir to his inheritance. After Vincent kills Trinh, the trio is forced to complete the last challenge: Cut through Spencer's corpse to find the deed to his fortune. Vincent and Theo get into a heated confrontation, with the former accusing the latter of turning the family against him and motivating Spencer to set up his kidnapping. Vincent attempts to kill Theo and chases him to the study, where Theo uses Trinh's wire saw to behead Vincent. Theo asks Liv if he can be the sole heir and confesses that his grandfather covered up his crime. In response, Liv snaps his neck and sets up the twins' corpses to seem as though Trinh killed them. Months later, Liv has become the heiress to the Galloways' fortune and property while pregnant with her cousin Theo's child.

=== Season 5: Ripper (2023) ===
No. overall	No. in season	Title	Directed by	Written by	Original release date
33	1	"The Slaughterhouse"	Adam MacDonald	Aaron Martin & Ian Carpenter	April 6, 2023
In 19th-century Toronto, newly appointed police detective Kenneth Rijkers investigates the murder of an upper-crust at the alleyways of Devil's Elbow, under the authority of tycoon Basil Garvey. In his interview with procurer Horatio Dixon and his girlfriend Daisy Zywiecki, the latter ascertains the figure was wearing a widow's funeral clothing in black - hence the killer's name. During the victim's second autopsy with medical examiner Dr. Melanda Israel, Rijkers finds a hidden note from the corpse. He concludes the killer is preying on the targets connected to the murder of Margaret Mehar. With the help of the current victim's wife Regina Simcoe, he uncovers pieces of evidence relating to Margaret and the infamous "Jack the Ripper" hoax. At Devil's Elbow, Garvey's henchmen, led by Eddie Jacobs, assault Horatio and the other street workers until Jacobs unwittingly kills Daisy in self-defense before they flee. As Horatio mourns her death, the Widow appears in the street and slowly decapitates him.
34	2	"The Painful Truth"	Adam MacDonald	Aaron Martin & Ian Carpenter	April 6, 2023
Rijkers arrests Jacobs under suspicion of the murders, who is subsequently released by his boss Isaac Kashtinsky. Isaac pulls Rijkers off the murder investigation. When local newspaper editor Enid Jenkins confronts Garvey who cautions her to discard the article of the Widow's attack, she seeks help from brothel-keeper Terrence Crenshaw to take down Garvey. He refuses fearing involvement but his cabaret performer Salomé provides Enid with evidence containing photos of Garvey's scandal. Before she can publish the paper at her shop, the Widow attacks Jenkins who had falsely identified the father of current town pastor Andrew May Jr. as Margaret's murderer. He was executed twelve years prior, facilitated by Garvey in exchange for a promotion. After Jenkins reveals that Garvey was behind Margaret's death and orchestrated the extortion to conceal his scheme, she is killed after the killer throws her into the printing press that crushes her to death.
35	3	"Backbone"	Adam MacDonald	Aaron Martin & Ian Carpenter	April 13, 2023
While observing Jenkins' murder, Rijkers revisits Regina to Alistair's office and uncovers the photos of Garvey and the other remaining targets of the killer from a party the week before Margaret is killed. The other victims are Jacobs, Kashtinsky, Salomé, Israel, the Botticelli sisters, and local magician Georges Rondeau. At the theater after rescuing Jacobs during the latter's earlier confrontation with Rondeau, Rijkers pursues the Widow through the street and is defeated in a fight before sparing his life. Jacobs, feeling guilty about not protecting Margaret from being tortured to death by Garvey and his cohorts, attempts to leave town at night after confronting his employer. En route, the Widow chases him and dislodges his carriage off the road. Jacobs attempts to run away, but the Widow trips him with the carriage's reins and incapacitates him with a sledgehammer before using it to smash his head.
36	4	"Left Handed Justice"	Adam MacDonald	Aaron Martin & Ian Carpenter	April 20, 2023
The Widow carves Jacobs's corpse, bakes it into individual meat pies, and leaves it in the local butcher shop to be bought by Garvey's housekeeper, Gladys, and served at Garvey's dinner party. Rijkers arrests Rondeau at Regina's residence for the alleged murders. When Rondeau denies the murder allegations, a cocaine-fueled Kashtinsky attempts to coerce a confession with torture until stopped by Terrence. Rijkers dismisses Kashtinsky and releases Rondeau. That night, a drunken Kashtinsky becomes disoriented and sees visions of Margaret. He remembers his first meeting with her at the Botticelli's house party twelve years prior and how she rejected his sexual advances. Wandering into the streets, Kashtinsky is lured into an empty carriage by the Widow, who ties him to a runaway horse that violently drags him through the town.
37	5	"Everybody's Darling"	Adam MacDonald	Shelley Scarrow	April 27, 2023
Salomé, before being taken into custody by Terrence, had been prostituting under Horatio alongside Margaret. Exploiting Terrence's sympathy, Salomé becomes the right-hand in his brothel while Margaret is sent to work as a house servant for the Botticellis. After Margaret humiliates her at a party, Salomé conspires with Garvey and the others to lure her into the bondage room at the brothel. They summon Alistair to rape her, after which Garvey kills her. After being interrogated by Rijkers, Salomé kills Terrence during a heated argument, as he learned that Venetia and Viviana Botticelli bribed her into selling their stepsister Verdi into sex slavery. Now alone in a house while attempting to evade imprisonment, a grief-stricken Salomé sees the Widow in the hallways and tries to escape. The killer captures her in the bondage room and sedates her body with anesthetics before dismembering her alive with a bone saw.
38	6	"Resurrections"	Adam MacDonald	Lucie Page	May 4, 2023
Afraid of being targeted by the Widow, Israel confesses Garvey's crime and her role in Margaret's murder to Rijkers. Rijkers, who now runs the police station, apprehends Israel, Garvey and Rondeau for interrogation. However, Rijkers knows he lacks sufficient evidence to convict Garvey. The interrogation is interrupted when Regina pleads for Israel to save Andrew after he is stabbed in the street by Garvey's henchman. Following a confrontation with the Widow, who then flees the hospital, Israel delivers her blood to Andrew. During the night, she reveals to Rijkers that after Margaret died, Garvey paid her to mutilate the corpse and leave it outside the alleyways so Jenkins could frame Andrew's father. After Rijkers releases Israel and Rondeau from incarceration, the Widow reappears and straps Israel onto her operating table. Israel is pinned with conductors throughout her body and electrocuted to death.
39	7	"Divine Secrets"	Adam MacDonald	Ian Carpenter	May 11, 2023
Verdi, having been freed from the abuse of her stepsisters, is bought from Venetia by Garvey, who plans to propose to her. Feeling guilty about his participation in Garvey's crime, Rondeau preps for his last magic show despite his assistant, Shanika, bailing for fear of the Widow. After being manipulated by Garvet, Verdi urges Venetia to participate in Rondeau's show and rigs his magic trick, during which he unwittingly saws Venetia in half. Verdi frames Viviana for her sister's murder, causing Viviana to be arrested by Rijkers. This is revealed to be part of Garvey's motive for eliminating one of the Botticellis - to avoid capture and preserve his reputation. Rondeau is then attacked and strangled to death in his tent by the Widow. Meanwhile, Rijkers spends the night at Regina's house, where Regina is revealed to be the Widow.
40	8	"Vengeance"	Adam MacDonald	Ian Carpenter	May 11, 2023
Before transforming into the Widow, Regina is revealed to have been Margaret Mehar's daughter. Both were taken under the abusive care of the Botticellis after Horatio sent Margaret away. When her mother was murdered, Regina was thrown out of the house by the sisters and adopted by one of the servants. Regina learned the truth after marrying Alistair, who later became her first victim. Rijkers, discovering Regina's identity after a confrontation at her house, demands she leave town. He threatens to imprison her and decides to deliver Garvey to the higher authorities. Rijkers's plan fails, as Garvey has him suspected of being the Widow and thrown in prison. Upon escaping prison, Rijkers decides to help Regina complete her retribution along with Gladys, Andrew, and Verdi, killing Garvey by tearing open his head.
