= Steve Byers =

Canadian actor

- Born: December 31, 1979 (age 46); Scarborough, Ontario, Canada
- Years active: 2000–present
- Spouse: Jennifer Steede
- Children: 2

Steve Byers (born December 31, 1979) is a Canadian actor, best known for his roles on Falcon Beach and Slasher.

== Early life ==
Byers was born in Scarborough, Ontario on December 31, 1979. He graduated in 1993, with the top award for Excellence in Drama from the Arts program at Unionville High School and enrolled in the University of Western Ontario's Film Program.

== Career ==
Among Byers' first professional roles were guest parts on La Femme Nikita and A Simple Wish. He moved to Vancouver and took a recurring role on MTV's comedy series 2gether, then Byers returned to his home town of Toronto to appear with Rachel McAdams in MTV's Shotgun Love Dolls. Byers has since worked on many network television series including Kevin Hill, Glory Days, and the Dresden Files. One of Byers' most notable roles is Jason Tanner on Falcon Beach. Byers appeared in Left for Dead with Danielle Harris, and in the film My Daughter's Secret.

In January 2009 he acted in CBC's short-lived drama Wild Roses as Will McGregor. He guest-starred in the tenth season of Smallville as DeSaad, one of Darkseid's minions. He played Heracles in Tarsem Singh's fantasy epic Immortals. He also appeared in Lifetime's series Against The Wall as Officer Steve Kowalski and in Alphas as John Bennett. He had a lead role in Catch a Christmas Star, a 2013 Hallmark movie and a supporting role in Gridlocked. In 2016, Byers played the leading role of Cam Henry in the television series Slasher.

== Personal life ==
Byers is married to actress Jennifer Steede, and has two children. Byers comes from an Irish background.

== Filmography ==
=== Film ===
Year	Title	Role	Notes
2002	Slap Shot 2: Breaking the Ice	Blaine	
2002	Heart of America	Jeff	
2003	House of the Dead	Matt	
2004	My Brother's Keeper	Victor Stanton	
2006	One Way	Ricardo	
2007	Heir Apparent	Sonny	Short film
2007	Left for Dead	Tommy St. Clair	
2010	The Man Who Loved Flowers	The Man Who Loved Flowers	Short film
2011	Immortals	Heracles	
2012	Total Recall	Hauser Cover Identities	
2015	Gridlocked	Scott Calloway	
2016	The Apostle Peter: Redemption	Martinian	
2017	Flatliners	Marlo's Brother	
2019	Goalie	Gordie Howe	
2023	Wickensburg	Uncle Dave	
2025	Return to Wickensburg	Uncle Dave	
2026	Foreign Tongue	David	

=== Television ===
Year	Title	Role	Notes
2000	First Wave	Medical Assistant	Episode: "Mabus"
2000	2gether: The Series	A. B. Ceedee	2 episodes
2001	The Wedding Dress	Captain Jeffries	Television film
2001	Much Ado About Whatever	Derek Thomas	Episode: "Gilby's Millions"
2001	Shotgun Love Dolls	Damien	Unsold pilot
2002	Glory Days	Brad the Clown	Episode: "Clowning Glory"
2002	Carrie	Roy Evarts	Television film
2003	John Doe	Eyebrow Ring Teenager	Episode: "Illegal Alien"
2003	Missing	Ben Nugent	Episode: "They Come as They Go"
2004	Mutant X	Leo Pierce	Episode: "Brother's Keeper"
2004	True Crimes: The First 72 Hours	Dan Banting	Documentary series; episode: "Hijacked"
2005	Kevin Hill	Russell Minden	Episode: "Man's Best Friend"
2006–2007	Falcon Beach	Jason Tanner	26 episodes
2007; 2008	The Dresden Files	Brady Whitfield / Jason Tanner	2 episodes
2007	My Daughter's Secret	Brent	Television film
2008	Glitch	Jason	Television film
2009	Wild Roses	Will McGregor	12 episodes
2009	Final Verdict	Casey Gordon	Television film
2009	CSI: Miami	Tyler Marr	Episode: "Chip/Tuck"
2010	The Bridge	Anders	Episode: "The Unguarded Moment"
2010–2011	Smallville	DeSaad	3 episodes
2011	Against the Wall	Officer Steve Kowalski	10 episodes
2011	Call Me Fitz	Olaf Stoltzfus	Episode: "How Do You Say 'Blow Job' in Pennsylvania Dutch?"
2012	Alphas	John Bennett	7 episodes
2012	The L.A. Complex	Gary Sanders	5 episodes
2013	Catch a Christmas Star	Chris Marshall	Television film
2014	Rocky Road	Rick Johnson	Television film
2014	The Lottery	Luke / Perry's boss n lover	Episode: "Crystal City"
2015	Remedy	Gord Mathers	2 episodes
2015–2016	The Man in the High Castle	Lawrence Klemm	8 episodes
2016	Slasher: The Executioner	Cam Henry	8 episodes
2017	Ransom	Fraser	Episode: "Joe"
2017	Reign	Ferdinand I	5 episodes
2017	Deadly Secrets by the Lake	Hayden Blake	Television film
2017	The Christmas Cure	Mitch	Television film
2018–2019	Shadowhunters	Andrew Underhill	9 episodes
2018	Good Witch: Tale of Two Hearts	Edward	Television special
2018	Supergirl	Tom	2 episodes
2019	Frankie Drake Mysteries	Hiram Bingham III	Episode: "The Old Switcheroo"
2019	Amish Abduction	Jacob	Television film
2020	Glass Houses	John Cooper	Television film
2020	Hudson & Rex	Asher Browning	Episode: "Flare of the Dog"
2020	Workin' Moms	Sean	4 episodes
2021	The Perfect Pairing		
2023	Slasher: Ripper	Andrew May Jr.	Main cast
2023	Royally Yours This Christmas	Prince James	Television film
2024	The Madness (TV series)	Bobby Woods	Part of group called the Forge

=== Video games ===
Year	Title	Role	Notes
2015	Assassin's Creed: Unity - Dead Kings	Raider 5	Voice
2016	The Division	Additional Voices	
2017	Ghost Recon: Wildlands	"Nomad"	
2018	Far Cry 5	Nick Rye	Voice and motion capture
2018	Far Cry 5: Lost on Mars	Nick Rye	
2019	Far Cry New Dawn	Nick Rye	
2019	The Division 2	Manny Ortega	

== Awards and nominations ==
Year	Award	Category	Work	Result	Ref
2017	Canadian Screen Awards	Best Performance by an Actor in a Leading Role in a Dramatic Program or Limited Series	Slasher	Nominated	
2018	TV Scoop Award	Best Guest Star	Shadowhunters	Nominated	
