= Sydney Meyer =

Canadian actress (born 1995)

- Born: 15 September 1995 (age 30); London, Ontario, Canada
- Occupation: Actress
- Years active: 2013–present
- Spouse: Alex Ozerov (m. 2021)

Sydney Meyer (born 15 September 1995) is a Canadian actress. She starred in the Netflix series V Wars (2019) and the Shudder series Slasher: Flesh & Blood (2021). She had recurring roles in the third season of the Freeform series Shadowhunters (2019), Grand Army (2020), also on Netflix, and the FX on Hulu adaptation of Y: The Last Man (2021).

== Early life and education ==
Meyer took classes at Lester B. Pearson School for the Arts when she was a child. She moved to Toronto at 15 to transfer from A.B. Lucas Secondary School to the Etobicoke School of the Arts, where she remained for two years. She also took summer courses at Stratford Shakespeare School and briefly danced with the Royal Winnipeg Ballet. She then went on to train at the New York Film Academy and the American Academy of Dramatic Arts in Los Angeles.

== Career ==
Meyer began her acting career at the age of 18, when she appeared in guest roles in the TV series Dangerous Persuasions, Degrassi: The Next Generation, Saving Hope, The Expanse, Transplant and The Good Doctor. Meyer appeared as Grace in the 2018 Canadian sci-fi horror film Level 16.

Meyer had a recurring role in the supernatural drama series Shadowhunters in 2019. In an interview she said that "It was incredible. It was also very intimidating", as it was her first recurring role and "such a strong reaction from the fans was startling". That same year, she appeared on the first season of the suspense drama series Departure. She said that her character "gets caught up in a conspiracy theory about a missing plane", and when asked about her interest in mysteries and conspiracies, "It’s fascinating to me how often these theories pop up and how elaborate they are." She was cast to play a main role in the sci-fi horror series V Wars also in 2019, based on the anthology series of the same name and comic book by Jonathan Maberry. 2020 was a busy year for Meyer, with a recurring role Grand Army portraying Anna Delaney, starring in Michelle Ouellet's thriller television film Remember Me, Mommy?, as well as starring in Leo Scherman's thriller television film Pretty Cheaters, Deadly Lies.

Meyer appeared on the fourth season of anthology horror series Slasher in 2021, where she played the role of Liv Vogel. Meyer also appeared on the first season of the post-apocalyptic drama series Y: The Last Man that same year, based on the comic book series of the same name by Brian K. Vaughan and Pia Guerra.

Meyer was cast in the sci-fi psychological thriller series Beacon 23 in 2023, portraying Grisha.

== Personal life ==
Meyer announced her engagement to fellow Canadian actor Alex Ozerov in June 2020, and they married in March 2021. They appeared alongside each other in Slasher: Flesh and Blood.

== Filmography ==
=== Film ===
Year	Title	Role	Notes
2014	Sprnva	Angie's Friend	Short film
2015	Rita Mahtoubian Is Not A Terrorist	Feinstein Daughter	Short film
2016	Alleluia! The Devil's Carnival	Workhorse	
2016	Seeds	Yoga Girl #2	Short film
2018	Level 16	Grace	
TBA	Separation	Party Goer	Short film
TBA	L is for Loser	Gina	Short film

=== Television ===
Year	Title	Role	Notes
2013	Dangerous Persuasions	Ron's Daughter	Episode: "Devil's Disciple"
2013	Degrassi: The Next Generation	Paula	Episode: "All I Wanna Do"
2017	Saving Hope	Rebecca Friedman	Episode: "All Our Yesterdays"
2018	The Expanse	Ensign Larson	Episode: "Immolation"
2019	Shadowhunters	Helen Blackthorn	4 episodes
2019	Departure	Sophia Giles	3 episodes
2019	V Wars	Ava O'Malley	Main role
2020	Remember Me, Mommy?	Elena Johns	Television film
2020	Transplant	Alexia	Episode: "Collapse"
2020	Grand Army	Anna Delaney	Recurring role
2020	Pretty Cheaters, Deadly Lies	Madison Willits	Television film
2021	Murdoch Mysteries	Clair Ferdinand	Episode: "Murder Checks In"
2021	Slasher	Lavinia "Liv" Vogel	Main role
2021	Y: The Last Man	Nicole	5 episodes
2022	The Good Doctor	Toni Rhodes	Episode: "Sorry, Not Sorry"
2023	Beacon 23	Grisha	Main role
2024	Hudson & Rex		
