= Overlord and the Underwoods =

Canadian-American live-action sitcom

- Genre: Sitcom
- Created by: Anthony Q. Farrell; Ryan Wiesbrock
- Starring: Darryl Hinds; Patrice Goodman; Ari Resnick; Kamaia Fairburn; Troy Feldman; Jann Arden; Jayne Eastwood
- Composer: Simon Poole
- Countries of origin: Canada; United States
- Original language: English
- No. of seasons: 1
- No. of episodes: 20

Production
- Executive producers: Mark J.W. Bishop; Matt Hornburg; Carrie Paupst Shaughnessy; Ryan Wiesbrock; Sean Gorman; Ian Lambur; Diane Rankin (SVP Rights); For BYUtv; Michael A. Dunn and Andra Johnson Duke
- Producers: Sally Catto; Trish Williams; Sandra Picheca; Greig Dymond
- Running time: 30 Minutes
- Production companies: MarbleMedia; Cloudco Entertainment; Canfro Productions

Original release
- Network: BYUtv; CBC Gem
- Release: October 29 – November 8, 2021

Overlord and the Underwoods is a television family sitcom co-created by Anthony Q. Farrell and Ryan Wiesbrock, and is a co-production between MarbleMedia and Cloudco Entertainment.

The series first premiered in the United Kingdom on October 4, 2021 on Nickelodeon, while it premiered in Canada on October 29, 2021 on CBC Gem. In the US the first 10 episodes were made available on November 8, 2021 on the BYUtv app.

== Premise ==
The series focuses on a North American family called the Underwoods, whose life is flipped upside down when the second most wanted criminal in the world, their distant cousin Overlord, who is an alien, seeks refuge in their home after being forced into intergalactic witness protection after he snitches on his boss and is made to live with the Underwoods.

== Cast ==
- Darryl Hinds as Jim Underwood
- Patrice Goodman as Flower Underwood
- Ari Resnick as Weaver Underwood
- Kamaia Fairburn as Willow Underwood
- Troy Feldman as Overlord
- Jann Arden as the voice of R0-FL, Overlord's robot sidekick
- Jayne Eastwood as the Underwoods' neighbour
- Constant Bernard as Reginald

== Episodes ==
No. overall	No. in season	Title	Directed by	Written by	Original release date
1	1	"Overstaying Your Welcome"	April Mullen	Anthony Q. Farrell	TBA
2	2	"Overthrowing the Underscores"	April Mullen	Kate Hewlett	TBA
3	3	"Undersized"	Casey Walker	Ryan Belleville	TBA
4	4	"Slime and Understanding"	April Mullen	Amanda Joy	TBA
5	5	"Into the Underbush"	Casey Walker	Anthony Q. Farrell	TBA
6	6	"Game Over!"	Casey Walker	Ryan Belleville	TBA
7	7	"Three Easy Overpayments"	Casey Walker	Jay Vaidya	TBA
8	8	"Not Under My Roof!"	Joyce Wong	Richard Young	TBA
9	9	"Thirteen Going on Overlord"	Steve Wright	Kate Hewlett	TBA
10	10	"Undercover LARP"	Joyce Wong	Jay Vaidya	TBA
11	11	"Overshooters"	Casey Walker	Ryan Belleville	TBA
12	12	"Overdue Update"	Steve Wright	Amanda Joy	TBA
13	13	"Overexposed"	Melanie Orr	Amanda Joy	TBA
14	14	"Family Over Frabjleplarm"	Joyce Wong	Angelica Mendizabal	TBA
15	15	"Overpiece Theatre"	Steve Wright	Anthony Q. Farrell	TBA
16	16	"Overlock Holmes and the Undercooked Pie"	Lisa Rose Snow	Anthony Q. Farrell	TBA
17	17	"Do-Over and Over and Over"	Joyce Wong	Kate Hewlett	TBA
18	18	"Under the Sea Land"	Melanie Orr	Ryan Belleville	TBA
19	19	"One Year Over-versary"	Melanie Orr	Jay Vaidya	TBA
20	20	"Over the Moon"	Melanie Orr	Anthony Q. Farrell	TBA

== Development and broadcast ==
The series was announced on March 16, 2021, and was pre-sold by Nickelodeon International, BYUtv in the United States, CBC in Canada and ITV in the United Kingdom on the same day.

Production on the series began in June 2021 in Oakville, Ontario.

BYUtv began airing the series on their app and at byutv.org on November 8, 2021. On October 3, 2022 BYUtv began airing season 1 on television. That same day they made the second batch of 10 episodes available on their app and website.

== Production concerns ==
The series was a topic of some controversy in the Canadian television industry after its production was announced in April 2021, when a newspaper article on the premiere of series creator Anthony Q. Farrell's contemporaneous The Parker Andersons included the statement that BYU TV series "couldn’t feature characters who are clearly identified as queer", due to the Church of Jesus Christ of Latter-day Saints' views on LGBTQ sexuality, along with those of Brigham Young University, which owns the network itself.

Within days, the network responded with a statement that "As a young network committed to bringing together religious and non-religious audiences, BYUtv is learning and exploring ways to partner with diverse content creators, writers and talent to implement meaningful co-viewing experiences for our target audience (children 8-15 and their parents). While BYUtv has not referenced LGBTQ+ topics and characters in the five original scripted series it has aired to date, we desire to address subjects – including LGBTQ+ – that are important to our growing and diverse audience. There are no policies that would exclude the network from including characters who identify as LGBTQ+, and BYUtv is exploring ways to do so," and Marblemedia confirmed that Overlord and the Underwoods will include LGBTQ characters.
