= Left for Dead (2007 horror film) =

2007 Canadian slasher film

- German DVD cover
- Directed by: Christopher Harrison
- Written by: Christopher Harrison
- Produced by: Ahmed Dirani, Raf Khoury; Christopher Harrison
- Starring: Steve Byers; Danielle Harris; Shawn Roberts; Robbie Amell
- Cinematography: Daniel Holmes
- Edited by: Christopher Harrison
- Music by: Marinho Nobre
- Production company: Mindscape Films
- Distributed by: Sunfilm Entertainment
- Release date: 6 November 2007 (Buenos Aires Rojo Sangre Film Festival)
- Running time: 78 minutes
- Country: Canada
- Language: English
- Budget: C$ 280,000

Left for Dead is a 2007 Canadian slasher film and the debut film for Mindscape Films, described by director Christopher Harrison as "an '80s slasher flick", similar to John Carpenter's Halloween series.

== Plot ==
The students of a Canadian town throw wild parties full of drugs, sex, and lost inhibitions every year at Halloween. But one Halloween, an uninvited guest comes for a visit. He wears a Halloween mask while he decimates the pleasure-seekers with a machete. Tommy, a party-goer, witnesses the murder of his friend Freddy, but neither the police nor friends believe him, and the corpse has vanished. Tommy harbors a terrible suspicion as the very bloody spectacle continues.

== Cast ==
- Danielle Harris as Nancy Simmons
- Steve Byers as Tommy St. Clair
- Shawn Roberts as Clarke Seamus
- Boyd Banks as Mike Clara
- Daniel Clark as Kenny Radford
- Lenka Matuska as Amber Shane
- Rebecca Davis as Jenna
- Naomi Hewer as Faye
- Ahmed Dirani as Paolo
- Robbie Amell as Blair
- John Bregar as Ryan
- JaNae Armogan as Shelly
- Emily Riley as Courtney
- Robert Wheeler as Tyler
- Jennifer Greer as Nancy
- Beckett Rider as Corey
- Sam Tiler as Police Officer
- Caila Mason as Police Officer
- Sofia Sweele as Paramedic
- Bradley Caball as Paramedic

== Production ==
Left for Dead was filmed in Hamilton, Ontario in Canada.

== Release ==
The film was released on 16 October 2009 in Germany and came out in North America in 2010.
