= Fire Serpent =

- Created by: William Shatner
- Written by: Garfield Reeves-Stevens; Judith Reeves-Stevens
- Directed by: John Terlesky
- Starring: Nicholas Brendon; Sandrine Holt; Randolph Mantooth; Robert Beltran; Lisa Langlois; Patrice Goodman; Steve Boyle; Michelle Morgan; Joseph Motiki
- Music by: Chuck Cirino
- Countries of origin: Canada; United States
- Original language: English

Production
- Executive producers: Tom Berry; Neil Bregman; Lisa M. Hansen; William Shatner
- Producers: Garfield Reeves-Stevens; Judith Reeves-Stevens; Stefan Wodoslawsky; Gordon Yang
- Cinematography: Patrick McGowan
- Editor: Robert E. Newton
- Running time: 89 minutes
- Production companies: CineTel Films; Kandu Entertainment; Outrage Productions; Premiere Bobine; S.V. Scary Films

Original release
- Network: Sci-Fi Channel
- Release: February 24, 2007

Fire Serpent is a 2007 Sci Fi Channel monster movie directed by John Terlesky.

== Plot ==
A solar flare from the sun sends a serpentine alien composed of fire to Earth where it begins to wreak havoc throughout a small community. During its search for more fuel to consume it stumbles upon a large military oil reserve. It soon becomes clear that an old man may hold the key to destroying it in the form of a Halogen Gun which may be used as a makeshift fire extinguisher of sorts. A small group of citizens decides to use this technology to make a stand against the creature only to face additional resistance from the beast, as well as a government employer who voluntarily helps the snake because he believes it is the spirit of a god.

== Cast ==
- Nicholas Brendon as Jake Relm
- Sandrine Holt as Christina Andrews
- Randolph Mantooth as Dutch Fallon
  - Diego Klattenhoff as young Dutch Fallon
- Robert Beltran as Cooke
- Lisa Langlois as Heather Allman
- Patrice Goodman as Billie
- Richard Clarkin as Kohler
- Steve Boyle as Dave Massaro
- Michelle Morgan as Donna Marks
- Vito Rezza as Bartender
- Joseph Motiki as Lieutenant Oliver
- Marco Bianco as State Trooper Parsons

== Reception ==
David Cornelius from DVD Talk gave the film a negative review, writing, "Fire Serpent is a wretched sci-fi/horror mess, with laughable CGI effects, an empty plot, and zero suspense. (In other words, it's your run-of-the-mill Sci-Fi Channel production. Zing!) It's the kind of B picture that fails not because it's cheap, but because it's terminally dull." Jon Condit from Dread Central awarded the film a negative score of 1 out of five, calling it "dull".
