= Jim Watson (actor) =

Canadian actor

- Born: March 23, 1989 (age 36); North Bay, Ontario
- Occupation: Actor
- Years active: 2012–present

Jim Watson (born March 23, 1989) is a Canadian actor best known for his roles as Pat in the television series Between, and Theo in Transplant. He has also had recurring roles in the television series Copper, The Strain, Mary Kills People and Slasher, and guest roles on Murdoch Mysteries, Saving Hope, Good Witch, Frankie Drake Mysteries and Hudson & Rex.

He studied acting at the George Brown Theatre School. He currently lives in Hamilton with his wife, musician Danielle Beaudin of the band The Redhill Valleys.
