= Catch a Christmas Star =

2013 film directed by John Bradshaw

- Directed by: John Bradshaw
- Starring: Shannon Elizabeth; Steve Byers
- Theme music composer: Stacey Hersh
- Countries of origin: Canada; United States
- Original language: English

Production
- Editor: Mark Arcieri
- Running time: 90 minutes

Original release
- Network: Hallmark Channel
- Release: 17 November 2013

Catch a Christmas Star is a Hallmark Channel film starring Shannon Elizabeth and directed by John Bradshaw. The film first aired on November 17, 2013.

== Plot ==
Chris Marshall (a widower for the past five years, with two children) works as a New Jersey high school basketball coach.

His daughter Sophie learns that Chris' first love in high school was Nikki Crandon, who has since become a successful pop star. Thus, Sophie plots to get the two back together.

== Cast ==
- Shannon Elizabeth as Nikki Crandon
- Steve Byers as Chris Marshall
- Kyle Harrison Breitkopf as Jackson Marshall
- Julia Lalonde as Sophie Marshall
- Zack Werner as Jaycee Silvestri
- Doug MacLeod as Mark
- Maria Ricossa as Shelley
- Billy MacLellan as Jason
- Christopher Jacot as Carmine
- Christopher Russell as Henry Williams

== Accolades ==
Year	Award	Category	Recipient(s)	Result	Ref.
2014	Young Artist Award	Best Young Actor in a TV Movie	Kyle Harrison Breitkopf	Won	
2014	Young Artist Award	Best Young Actress in a TV Movie	Julia Lalonde	Nominated	

== See also ==
- List of Christmas films
