= María del Mar Fernández =

María del Mar Fernández may refer to:

- María del Mar Fernández (singer), Spanish flamenco singer
- María del Mar Fernández (actress), Dominican actress
