= María del Mar Rey =

Spanish volleyball player (born 1968)

Personal information
- Full name: María del Mar Rey
- Nationality: Spanish
- Born: 29 September 1968 (age 58); Madrid, Spain

María del Mar Rey (born 29 September 1968) is a Spanish former volleyball player who competed in the 1992 Summer Olympics.
