= 9th Canadian Screen Awards =

9th year of awards given by the Academy of Canadian Cinema & Television

- Date: May 17–20, 2021
- Hosted by: Ginella Massa; Priyanka; Eric Bauza; Donté Colley; Tyrone Edwards; Nahéma Ricci; Karine Vanasse; Stephan James

Highlights
- Most awards: Blood Quantum (film), Schitt's Creek (TV)
- Most nominations: Blood Quantum (film), Schitt's Creek (TV)
- Best Motion Picture: Beans
- Best Dramatic Series: Transplant
- Best Comedy Series: Schitt's Creek

The 9th Canadian Screen Awards were presented by the Academy of Canadian Cinema and Television from 17–20 May 2021 to honour achievements in Canadian film, television, and digital media production in 2020. The presentations were held as a series of virtual events due to the COVID-19 pandemic.

Most nominations were announced on 3 March 2021; however, the nominations and winners in sports broadcasting categories were announced at a later date. In the film categories, the film Blood Quantum received the most award nominations (10), and ultimately the most wins (6), while in the television categories, Schitt's Creek also received both the most award nominations (21) and wins (8). No new winners were named for the Academy's annual special awards; instead, the honorees previously named in 2020, most notably Alex Trebek, were celebrated and highlighted.

== Ceremony information ==
Due to the COVID-19 pandemic, the ceremonies were once again held as a virtual event. Academy CEO Beth Janson stated that "it's not going to be just a Zoom call of an awards show. We have a lot of exciting and creative things in store."

Due to the impact of the pandemic on theatrical film distribution in 2020, the Academy revised its eligibility rules for films. Where the rules for feature films usually require a film to receive at least one full week of theatrical screenings in at least two of Canada's major metropolitan markets, the rules for 2020 permitted films that received at least four commercial screenings in just one major market, as well as films that were commercially screened on an Academy-approved list of video on demand platforms after having been planned for conventional theatrical distribution or screened in any qualifying Canadian film festival in 2020. Short films were eligible if they received one commercial screening in Canada, were accepted into two qualifying film festivals or were distributed on an approved VOD platform; documentary films were eligible if they received three commercial screenings, were accepted into two qualifying film festivals, or were screened on one of the approved VOD platforms.

Janson stated that she was confident these eligibility changes would help the awards proceed normally; she also stated, however, that with the pandemic having impacted film production in 2020, the Academy was more concerned about the possibility of a downturn in qualifying content for the 10th Canadian Screen Awards in 2022. The Academy also introduced a number of new projects in 2020 to foster increased representation of diversity in the Canadian film industry, including an equity and inclusion fund to help defray the award submission fees for work by emerging content creators of colour, and new rules requiring indigenous-themed content to demonstrate direct indigenous engagement in the production, in accordance with the Indigenous Screen Office's principles of narrative sovereignty.

Other new changes at the 9th ceremony included the renaming of the Overall Sound category to Sound Mixing, and the introduction of new categories for Best Casting in films and Best Stunt Coordination.

=== Eligible streaming platforms ===
The eligible streaming platforms for the 9th Canadian Screen Awards included Amazon Prime, CBC Gem, the Cineplex Store, Club Illico, Crave, The Criterion Channel, CuriosityStream, Documentary Online Cinema, the Digital TIFF Bell Lightbox, Disney+, Dove Channel, Fandor, FlixFling, Google Play, Greetings from Isolation, GuideDoc, Highball TV, Hollywood Suite, Hoopla, Ignite TV On Demand, iTunes, Kanopy, Microsoft Films & TV, MUBI, Netflix, Pantaflix, Popcornflix, Shudder, Spuul, SundanceNow, Super Channel on Demand, Tubi, Vimeo on Demand and YouTube Premium.

== Film ==
| Motion Picture | Direction |
|---|---|
| Beans — Anne-Marie Gélinas; Funny Boy — David Hamilton, Hussain Amarshi; Nadia, Butterfly — Dominique Dussault; The Nest — Ed Guiney, Derrin Schlesinger, Rose Garnett, Sean Durkin; Underground (Souterrain) — Étienne Hansez | Deepa Mehta, Funny Boy; Brandon Cronenberg, Possessor; Sophie Dupuis, Underground (Souterrain); Sean Durkin, The Nest; Pascal Plante, Nadia, Butterfly |
| Actor | Actress |
| Michael Greyeyes, Blood Quantum; Lance Henriksen, Falling; Joakim Robillard, Underground (Souterrain); Saul Williams, Akilla's Escape; Alex Wolff, Castle in the Ground | Michelle Pfeiffer, French Exit; Carrie Coon, The Nest; Carmen Moore, Rustic Oracle; Rosalie Pépin, Vacarme; Madeleine Sims-Fewer, Violation |
| Supporting Actor | Supporting Actress |
| Colm Feore, Sugar Daddy; Jesse LaVercombe, Violation; Stephen McHattie, Come to Daddy; Ronnie Rowe Jr., Akilla's Escape; Thamela Mpumlwana, Akilla's Escape | Mary Walsh, Happy Place; Agam Darshi, Funny Boy; Felicity Huffman, Tammy's Always Dying; Micheline Lanctôt, Laughter (Le Rire); Amy Groening, Bone Cage |
| Original Screenplay | Adapted Screenplay |
| Charles Officer and Wendy Motion Brathwaite, Akilla's Escape; Jeff Barnaby, Blood Quantum; Sean Durkin, The Nest; Sophie Dupuis, Underground (Souterrain); Evan Morgan, The Kid Detective | Shyam Selvadurai and Deepa Mehta, Funny Boy; Johnny Darrell, Andrew Duncan and Loretta Todd, Monkey Beach; Patrick deWitt, French Exit; Catherine Léger, Goddess of the Fireflies (La déesse des mouches à feu); Taylor Olson, Bone Cage |
| Feature Length Documentary | Short Documentary |
| Wandering: A Rohingya Story (Errance sans retour) — Mélanie Carrier, Olivier Higgins; The Forbidden Reel — Ariel Nasr, Sergeo Kirby, Kat Baulu, Annette Clarke; Stateless — Michèle Stephenson, Jennifer Holness, Lea Marin, Anita Lee, Joe Brewster, Sudz Sutherland; A Woman, My Mother (Une femme, ma mère) — Claude Demers; The World Is Bright — Ying Wang, Jian Ping Su, Jordan Paterson | Sing Me a Lullaby — Tiffany Hsiung; CHSLD — François Delisle; êmîcêtôcêt: Many Bloodlines — Alex Bailey, Theola Ross; Jesse Jams — Trevor Anderson, Alyson Richards, Alexandra Lazarowich, Penny Frazier, Kim Hsu Guise, Lizzy Karp, Christina Willings; Mutts (Clebs) — Halima Ouardiri |
| Live Action Short Drama | Animated Short |
| Black Bodies — Kelly Fyffe-Marshall, Tamar Bird, Sasha Leigh Henry; Bad Omen — Salar Pashtoonyar; Benjamin, Benny, Ben — Paul Shkordoff, Jason Aita; Cayenne — Simon Gionet; Goodbye Golovin — Mathieu Grimard, Simon Corriveau | Hot Flash — Thea Hollatz, Kristy Neville, Matt Code, Morghan Fortier, Brett Jubinville; 4 North A — Jordan Canning, Howie Shia, Annette Clarke; The Fourfold — Alisi Telengut; The Great Malaise (Le mal du siècle) — Catherine Lepage, Marc Bertrand; I, Barnabé (Moi, Barnabé) — Jean-François Lévesque, Julie Roy |
| Art Direction/Production Design | Best Casting |
| Louisa Schabas and Sylvain Lemaitre, Blood Quantum; Phillip Barker, Guest of Honour; André-Line Beauparlant, Goddess of the Fireflies (La déesse des mouches à feu); Jennifer Morden and Matthew Bianchi, The Kid Detective; Carol Spier, Falling | Nicole Hilliard-Forde, Akilla's Escape; Deirdre Bowen, Falling; Pam Dixon and Deirdre Bowen, Possessor; Maxime Giroux, Beans; Rene Haynes, Blood Quantum |
| Cinematography | Best Cinematography in a Documentary |
| Maya Bankovic, Akilla's Escape; Marie Davignon, Beans; James Klopko, A Fire in the Cold Season; Michel St-Martin, Blood Quantum; Stéphanie Weber Biron, Nadia, Butterfly | Ryan Randall, Workhorse; Jean-Philippe Archibald, The Free Ones (Les libres); Glauco Bermudez and Mark Ó Fearghaíl, Influence; Renaud Philippe and Olivier Higgins, Wandering: A Rohingya Story (Errance sans retour); Kiarash Sadigh, Nahanni: River of Forgiveness |
| Editing | Best Editing in a Documentary |
| Jeff Barnaby, Blood Quantum; Christine Armstrong, Sugar Daddy; Jane MacRae, The Cuban; Ronald Sanders, Falling; Arthur Tarnowski, The Decline (Jusqu'au déclin) | Natalie Lamoureux, A Woman, My Mother (Une femme, ma mère); Natacha Dufaux, The Free Ones (Les libres); Lawrence Le Lam, The World Is Bright; Jonah Malak, Dave Not Coming Back; Peter Roeck, The New Corporation: The Unfortunately Necessary Sequel |
| Costume Design | Hair |
| Noémi Poulin, Blood Quantum; Bernadette Croft, Happy Place; Anne Dixon, Falling; Marie Grogan Hales, The Marijuana Conspiracy; Patricia McNeil and Ann Roth, My Salinger Year | Michelle Côté, My Salinger Year; Renée Chan, Tammy's Always Dying; Patricia Cuthbert, Random Acts of Violence; France Latreille, French Exit; Ashley Nay, Happy Place |
| Makeup | Visual Effects |
| Erik Gosselin, Joan-Patricia Parris, Jean-Michel Rossignol and Nancy Ferlatte, Blood Quantum; Sidney Armour, The Marijuana Conspiracy; Elizabeth Gruszka, Funny Boy; Dan Martin, Traci Loader and Dorota Mitoraj, Possessor; Emily O'Quinn, Paul Jones and Emma Lee Hilton, Random Acts of Violence | Joshua Sherrett, Barbara Rosenstein, Ibi Atemie, David Atexide, Juan Carlos Ferrá, Alex Flynn, Andrei Gheorghiu, Felix Sherrett-Brown, Ali Hamidikia and Tony Wu, Blood Quantum; Brian Huynh, William Chang, Steven Huynh, Sophia Jooyeon Lee and Justin Perreault, Code 8; Peter McAuley, Michael Bishop, Derek Gebhart, Armen Bunag, Luke White, James Marin, Marco Polsinelli, Andrew Rolfe and Davor Celar, Funny Boy; Liam Neville, Kenneth Coyne, Piers Larchet, Rob Murray, Shane Browne, Dave Thomas, Mihail Dumbravestu, Allen Sillery, Christoph Gaudi and Michael McCarthy, French Exit; François Trudel and Cynthia Mourou, Laughter (Le Rire) |
| Sound Editing | Sound Mixing |
| David McCallum, David Rose, Krystin Hunter and William Kellerman, Akilla's Escape; Matthew Chan and Ida Marci, Violation; Paul Germann, Brennan Mercer and Martin Gwynn Jones, The Nest; James Sizemore, Jane Tattersall, David McCallum, Steve Medeiros, Krystin Hunter, Stefan Fraticelli and Jason Charbonneau, Funny Boy; Clive Turner, Mark Shniruwsky and Marvyn Dennis, Random Acts of Violence | Graham Rogers, James Bastable, Daniel Moctezuma and Brad Dawe, Akilla's Escape; Stephane Bergeron and Yann Cleary, Beans; Matthew Chan, Violation; Colin McLellan, Mark Zsifkovits, Devin Doucette, Daniel Moctezuma, Rachelle Audet, Bertrand Duranleau, Thomas Holroyd and Jeffrey Roy, Random Acts of Violence; Lou Solakofski, Joe Morrow, Randy Wilson and Ron Melgers, Funny Boy |
| Original Score | Original Song |
| Howard Shore, Funny Boy; Janal Bechthold, Marlene; Mychael Danna, Guest of Honour; Jay McCarrol, The Kid Detective; Michelle Osis and Lowell Boland, Bloodthirsty | Marie-Hélène L. Delorme, "Timid Joyous Atrocious" — Sugar Daddy; Lowell Boland, Evan Bogart and Justin Gray, "Grey Singing in Auditorium" — Bloodthirsty; Hilario Durán, "El Milagro" — The Cuban; Hilario Durán, "Mambo in Dominante" — The Cuban; Ariane Moffatt, "Merci pour tout" — Thanks for Everything (Merci pour tout) |
John Dunning Best First Feature
Beans — Tracey Deer; The Kid Detective — Evan Morgan; Tito — Grace Glowicki; Vacarme — Neegan Trudel; Violation — Madeleine Sims-Fewer, Dusty Mancinelli

== Television ==
=== Programs ===
| Drama Series | Comedy Series |
|---|---|
| Transplant; Burden of Truth; Cardinal: Until the Night; Departure; Vikings | Schitt's Creek; Baroness von Sketch Show; Kim's Convenience; Letterkenny; Workin' Moms |
| Animated program or series | Documentary program |
| Corner Gas Animated; Hotel Transylvania: The Series; The Magic School Bus Rides Again: "The Frizz Connection"; Snoopy in Space; Wild Kratts | CBC Docs POV: "Hockey Mom"; CBC Docs POV: "Company Town"; Hot Docs at Home: "Finding Sally"; CBC Docs POV: "The Internet of Everything"; Hot Docs at Home: "They Call Me Dr. Miami" |
| Children's or youth fiction | Children's or youth non-fiction |
| Odd Squad Mobile Unit; Detention Adventure; Endlings; Holly Hobbie; Utopia Falls | Your Kids, Their Questions: A Your Morning Coronavirus Special; All-Round Champion; Backyard Beats; Every Child Matters; My Stay-at-Home Diary |
| TV movie | Biography or Arts Documentary Program or Series |
| Christmas Jars; Glass Houses; No Good Deed; The Sanctuary | Best Wishes, Warmest Regards: A Schitt's Creek Farewell; David Foster: Off the Record; Exhibitionists; The Nature of Things: "Aging Well Suzuki Style"; There Are No Fakes |
| Science or Nature Documentary Program or Series (Rob Stewart Award) | Social/Political Documentary Program (Donald Brittain Award) |
| The Nature of Things: "Takaya: Lone Wolf" — André Barro, Martin Williams, Cheryl Alexander, Bruce Whitty, Kim Bondi, Gaby Bastyra; The Nature of Things: "Be Afraid: The Science of Fear" — Gordon Henderson, Stuart Henderson, Rita Kotzia; The Nature of Things: "Pass the Salt" — Judy Holm, Michael McNamara, Aaron Hancox; The Nature of Things: "She Walks with Apes" — Mark Starowicz, Caitlin Starowicz; Striking Balance — Yvonne Drebert | 9/11 Kids — Steve Gamester, Michael Kot, Betty Orr, Elizabeth St. Philip; Above the Law — Geoff Morrison, Marc Serpa Francoeur, Robinder Uppal; Assholes: A Theory — Ann Bernier, Annette Clarke, John Walker; Meat the Future — Liz Marshall, Janice Dawe, Chris Hegedus; The Walrus and the Whistleblower — Frederic Bohbot, Nathalie Bibeau |
| Factual Program or Series | History Program or Series |
| You Can't Ask That; Age of Samurai: Battle for Japan; The Detectives; Good People; Wild Archaeology | Enslaved; Cheating Hitler: Surviving the Holocaust; Fight to the Finish; Unabomber: In His Own Words; Witches of Salem |
| Lifestyle Program or Series | Performing arts program |
| Mary's Kitchen Crush; Carnival Eats; Property Brothers: Forever Home; Restaurants on the Edge; Scott's Vacation House Rules | We're Funny That Way: The Virtual Pride Special; La Bohème; FreeUp! The Emancipation Day Special; Othello |
| Pre-School Program or Series | Reality/Competition Program or Series |
| PAW Patrol; Abby Hatcher; Dino Dana; Esme & Roy; True and the Rainbow Kingdom | Canada's Drag Race; Battle of the Blades; Dragons' Den; The Great Canadian Baking Show; Wall of Chefs |
| Talk program or series | Variety or entertainment special |
| Power & Politics; The Marilyn Denis Show; Power Play; The Social | Aisha Brown: The First Black Woman Ever; Being Black in Canada; eTalk Presents: Alicia Keys; Jann Arden One Night Only; Queer Pride Inside |

=== Actors ===
| Lead actor, drama | Lead actress, drama |
|---|---|
| Hamza Haq, Transplant; Billy Campbell, Cardinal: Until the Night; Roger Cross, Coroner; Peter Mooney, Burden of Truth; Joel Oulette, Trickster | Crystle Lightning, Trickster; Vinessa Antoine, Diggstown; Kristin Kreuk, Burden of Truth; Melanie Scrofano, Wynonna Earp; Karine Vanasse, Cardinal: Until the Night |
| Lead actor, comedy | Lead actress, comedy |
| Paul Sun-Hyung Lee, Kim's Convenience; Dan Levy, Schitt's Creek; Eugene Levy, Schitt's Creek; Jared Keeso, Letterkenny | Catherine O'Hara, Schitt's Creek; Dani Kind, Workin' Moms; Annie Murphy, Schitt's Creek; Catherine Reitman, Workin' Moms; Jean Yoon, Kim's Convenience |
| Supporting actor, drama | Supporting actress, drama |
| Christopher Plummer, Departure; Evan Buliung, Departure; Jonny Harris, Murdoch Mysteries; Joel Thomas Hynes, Trickster; Kalani Queypo, Trickster | Tamara Podemski, Coroner; Anna Lambe, Trickster; Georgina Lightning, Trickster; Sharron Matthews, Frankie Drake Mysteries; Gail Maurice, Trickster |
| Supporting actor, comedy | Supporting actress, comedy |
| Andrew Phung, Kim's Convenience; Ryan Belleville, Workin' Moms; Chris Elliott, Schitt's Creek; Peter Keleghan, Workin' Moms; Noah Reid, Schitt's Creek | Emily Hampshire, Schitt's Creek; Sarah McVie, Workin' Moms; Juno Rinaldi, Workin' Moms; Jennifer Robertson, Schitt's Creek; Karen Robinson, Schitt's Creek |
| Performance in a guest role, comedy series | Performance in a guest role, drama series |
| Amanda Brugel, Kim's Convenience; Elisha Cuthbert, Jann; Victor Garber, Schitt's Creek; Rizwan Manji, Schitt's Creek; Colin Mochrie, Workin' Moms | Shawn Doyle, Cardinal: Until the Night; Oluniké Adeliyi, Coroner; Nicola Correia-Damude, Coroner; Wendy Crewson, Frankie Drake Mysteries; Colin Mochrie, Murdoch Mysteries |
| Performance in an animated program or series | Performance in a children's or youth program or series |
| Lorne Cardinal, Corner Gas Animated; Lilly Bartlam, PAW Patrol; Julie Lemieux, Alien TV; Bryn McAuley, Hotel Transylvania: The Series; Patrick McKenna, Esme & Roy | Saara Chaudry, Dino Dana; Lilly Bartlam, Detention Adventure; Ruby Jay, Holly Hobbie; Simone Miller, Detention Adventure; Tomaso Sanelli, Detention Adventure |
| Performance in a variety or sketch comedy program or series | Lead performance, TV movie |
| Carolyn Taylor, Meredith MacNeill, Aurora Browne and Jennifer Whalen, Baroness von Sketch Show; Cathy Jones, Mark Critch, Susan Kent and Trent McClellan, This Hour Has 22 Minutes; Maggie Cassella, Katie Rigg, Carolyn Taylor, Gavin Crawford, Lea DeLaria, Colin Mochrie, Kinley Mochrie and Deb McGrath, We're Funny That Way: The Virtual Pride Special | Kim Shaw, The Lead; Mark Rendall, No Good Deed; Jeni Ross, Christmas Jars; Markian Tarasiuk, Christmas Jars |

=== News and information ===
| National newscast | Local newscast |
|---|---|
| CTV National News; APTN National News; CBC News: The National; Global National | CityNews; CBC Vancouver News at 6; CTV News Toronto at 6; Global News BC |
| News special | News or information program |
| CBC News: The National: George Floyd protests; CBC News: Canada Votes; CTV News: Election 2019 | W5: "The Invisible Man"; APTN: Nation to Nation: "Stopping the Ripple"; CBC News: The National: Ukraine International Airlines Flight 752; The Fifth Estate: "The Autopsy (Part 1)"; CBC News Vancouver: "Unmasking Racism" |
| News anchor, national | News anchor, local |
| Lisa LaFlamme, CTV National News; Andrew Chang, Adrienne Arsenault and Ian Hanomansing, CBC News: The National; Dawna Friesen, Global National; Melissa Ridgen and Dennis Ward, APTN National News | Dwight Drummond, CBC Toronto News at 6; Debra Arbec, CBC Montreal News at 6; Michelle Dubé and Nathan Downer, CTV News Toronto at 6; Chris Ensing, CBC Windsor News at 6; Tom Murphy and Amy Smith, CBC Nova Scotia News at 6 |
| News reporter, national | News reporter, local |
| Christine Birak, CBC News: The National; Chris Brown, CBC News: The National; Avis Favaro, CTV National News; Jeff Semple, Global National | Angela Sterritt, CBC Vancouver News at 6; Joanne Chianello, CBC Ottawa News at 6; Leah Hendry, CBC Montreal News at 6; Chris Glover, CBC Toronto News at 6 |
| News or information series | News or information segment |
| The Fifth Estate; The Agenda; APTN Investigates; Marketplace; W5 | APTN Investigates: "Writing Home"; CBC News: The National: "Inside COVID"; CBC News: The National: "Migrant Workers"; Marketplace: "Banned from Seniors' Homes"; W5: "The Tarnished Badge" |
| Morning show | Entertainment news program or series |
| Breakfast Television; CBC News: Morning Live with Heather Hiscox; CP24 Breakfast; Your Morning | Stronger Together, Tous Ensemble; ET Canada: Black Change Makers; eTalk; The Heroes of COVID |
| Host, talk show or entertainment news | Host or presenter, factual or reality/competition series |
| Jann Arden, Jann Arden One Night Only; Maggie Cassella, We're Funny That Way Virtual Pride Special; Melissa Grelo, Elaine Lui, Cynthia Loyst, Marci Ien and Jess Allen, The Social; Dina Pugliese, Breakfast Television; Tara Slone, Budweiser Stage at Home | Jeffrey Bowyer-Chapman, Brooke Lynn Hytes and Stacey McKenzie, Canada's Drag Race; Noah Cappe, Wall of Chefs; Arisa Cox, Big Brother Canada; Jonny Harris, Still Standing; Carolyn Taylor and Aurora Browne, The Great Canadian Baking Show |
| Host, lifestyle program | Host or interviewer, news or information program or series |
| Mary Berg, Mary's Kitchen Crush; Noah Cappe, Carnival Eats; John Catucci, Big Food Bucket List; David Rocco, David Rocco's Dolce Italia; Drew Scott and Jonathan Scott, Property Brothers: Forever Home | Asha Tomlinson, Marketplace; Adrienne Arsenault, CBC News: The National; Sarain Fox, Inendi; Avery Haines, W5; Steve Paikin, The Agenda |
Host, live entertainment special
Jann Arden, 2019 Scotiabank Giller Prize; Silken Laumann and Maitreyi Ramakrishnan, Unsinkable Youth; Ben Mulroney, Danielle Graham and Elaine Lui, eTalk Live at the Oscars

=== Sports ===
Because many of the live sporting events on which sports broadcasting depends were cancelled in 2020, the Academy extended the eligibility period in sports broadcasting categories, and named the nominees and winners in separate events in July 2021.

| Live sporting event coverage | Sports analysis or commentary |
|---|---|
| 2019 Grey Cup — Paul Graham, Jon Hynes; 2021 IIHF World Junior Gold Medal Game — Paul Graham, Chris Edwards; BMO Nations Cup — Jeff Pearlman, Don Peppin, Paul McDougall; 2020 Stanley Cup Finals, Game 6 — Ed Hall, Sherali Najak, Brian Spear, John Szpala | Cassie Campbell-Pascall, Hockey Night in Canada; Kevin Bieksa, Hockey Night in Canada; Ray Ferraro, 2020 IIHF World Junior Gold Medal Game; Buck Martinez, Blue Jays on Sportsnet |
| Sports host | Sports play-by-play |
| Tim Micallef, Tim and Sid; James Duthie, 2020 NHL Free Agent Frenzy; Ron MacLean, Hockey Night in Canada; Scott Russell, Road to the Olympic Games | Harnarayan Singh, Hockey Night in Canada in Punjabi; Chris Cuthbert, 2019 Grey Cup; Mark Lee, Road to the Olympic Games; Dan Shulman, Blue Jays on Sportsnet |
| Sports feature segment | Sports opening |
| Tracy Britnell, Devon Burns, Darren Oliver, Owen Ewers, Kevin Fallis, Brent Robichaud and Ken Volden, "Disorder"; Brenda Irving, Ian Hoag and Jeff Pearlman, "BMO Nations Cup"; Matt Dorman, Sylvain Rancourt, Darren Oliver, Michael Banani, Roy Janke and Ken Volden, "Front Line"; Rick Westhead, Josh Shiaman, Michael Banani, Devon Burns and Ken Volden, "The Unwanted Visitor" | Michael Adach, Mike Fleury and Mark Wade, NHL All Star Game; Stephen Brunt, Phillip Rzentkowski, Mike Fleury, Mark Wade, Jason McKinnon and Rick Starks, Fresh Ice: A Stephen Brunt Essay; Simon Garan, Jacob Frenkel, Devon Burns, David Midgley and Ken Volden, TSN Raptors Playoffs August 2020 |
| Sports program or series | |
Scotiabank Hockey Day in Canada — Joel Darling, Mike Fleury, Matt Marstrom, Deidre Hambly, Rod McLachlan, John Whaley; Alex to Ovi: The Story of the Great Eight — Stephen Brunt, Marc LeBlanc, Jeremy McElhanney, John Woo, Tim Libeau, Jim Kowats; Anything Is Possible: A Serge Ibaka Story — Vinay Virmani, Scott Moore, Karen Volden, Travis Wood, Christian Cote, Serge Ibaka, Elia Saikaly; Road to the Olympic Games — Mike Dodson, Paul McDougall, Sunil Thakolkaren

=== Craft awards ===
| Editorial research | Visual research |
|---|---|
| Margot Daley, Gabi Veras, Anthony Cantor, Avi Merkado, Andrew Theobald and Brennan Leffler, Enslaved: The Lost History of the Transatlantic Slave Trade; Natasza Niedzielska, Heather Kohlmann, Steve Gamester, Rebecca Snow and Naomi Wise, Cheating Hitler: Surviving the Holocaust; Laura Baron Kastner, Allya Davidson and Joanne Loton, There Are No Fakes; Phyllis Ellis, Sandra Bartlett, Karen Dougherty, Sarah Michael and Connie Littlefield, Toxic Beauty; Nathalie Bibeau, The Walrus and the Whistleblower | Elizabeth Klinck, Elspeth Domville and Monica Penner, Cheating Hitler: Surviving the Holocaust; Tanya Fleet, Enslaved: The Lost History of the Transatlantic Slave Trade; Cindy Wolfe and Elizabeth Klinck, Gordon Lightfoot: If You Could Read My Mind; Kathie McKenna, Nancy Lang, Connie Littlefield, Isabelle Foisy, Michelle Demeyere and Jessica Joy Wise, CBC Docs POV: "Margaret Atwood: A Word after a Word after a Word is Power"; Daniel Roher, Jessica Joy Wise, Larry Yelen, Cindy Wolfe, Lanna Lucas, Shayne Ciarlo McGreal, Charlie Shekter, Max Berger and Adam Stewart, Once Were Brothers: Robbie Robertson and The Band |
| Make-Up | Hair |
| Steve Newburn, Emily O'Quinn Code, Kayla Dobilas and Trina Brink, Trickster: "Episode 104"; Randy Daudlin, Paul Jones and Trina Brink, Cardinal: Until the Night: "Neil"; Candice Ornstein and Lucky Bromhead, Schitt's Creek: "Happy Ending"; Bruno Gatien, Marlène Rouleau and Mariane Simard, Transplant: "Birth and Rebirth"; Joanne Jacobsen, Wynonna Earp: "Afraid" | Annastasia Cucullo and Ana Sorys, Schitt's Creek: "Happy Ending"; Shirley Bond, Murdoch Mysteries: "In the Company of Women"; Ashley Nay and Dann Campbell, Cardinal: Until the Night: "John & Lise"; Ashley Nay and Dann Campbell, Trickster: "Episode 103"; Cindy Lou Tache, Frankie Drake Mysteries: "Out on a Limb" |
| Casting | Costume Design |
| Lisa Parasyn and Jon Comerford, Schitt's Creek; Deirdre Bowen, Kim's Convenience; Jenny Lewis and Sara Kay, Letterkenny; Frank Moiselle, Nuala Moiselle and Deirdre Bowen, Vikings; Heather Muir, Canada's Drag Race | Debra Hanson, Schitt's Creek: "Happy Ending"; Nicole Manek, Baroness von Sketch Show: "Baby Toe Disease"; Bernadette Croft, Cardinal: Until the Night: "Robert"; Jenifur Jarvis, Frankie Drake Mysteries: "Out on a Limb"; Joanna Syrokomla, Murdoch Mysteries: "Fox Hunt" |
| Photography in a comedy series | Photography in a documentary program or factual series |
| James Klopko, Kim's Convenience: "Couch Surfing"; Brett Van Dyke, Jann: "The Tunies"; Jim Westenbrink, Letterkenny: "The Rippers"; Éric Cayla, Private Eyes: "Smoke Gets in Your Eyes"; Kristin Fieldhouse, Workin' Moms: "To Lure a Squirrel" | Derek Rogers, Paul Jenkins, Elad Winkler, Martin Buzora, Richard Stevenson, Tom Pridham and David Mariottini, Enslaved: The Lost History of the Transatlantic Slave Trade; Chris Romeike, 9/11 Kids; Hugo Kitching and Chris Yapp, The Nature of Things: "Accidental Wilderness: The Leslie Street Spit"; Mark Caswell and Alysha Galbreath, Cheating Hitler: Surviving the Holocaust; Derek Rogers, There Are No Fakes |
| Photography in a drama program or series | Photography in a lifestyle or reality program or series |
| Steve Cosens, Cardinal: Until the Night: "Robert"; Craig Wright, Departure: "Vanished"; Celiana Cárdenas, Diggstown: "Cheryl Battiste"; Pierre Gill, Transplant: "Pilot"; Serge Desrosiers, Within These Walls | Joe Queenan, Restaurants on the Edge: "Austria"; Claudio Manni, Handmade Hotels: "Take a Chance"; Stephen Gelder and Danny Nash, Healthy Is Hot: "Healthy Is...Tapping into Your Inner Wild Child"; Mike Rilstone, Making it Home with Kortney and Dave: "Meisha & Brian"; Ryan Morgan and Stephen McIntyre, Vikings, Worlds at War with ET Canada |
| Photography in a news or information program, series or segment | Editing in a comedy program or series |
| Jerry Vienneau, W5: "The Survivors"; Rob Smith, APTN Investigates: "Writing Home"; Bill Arnold and David MacIntosh, Marketplace: "Tracking Your Trash"; Jared Thomas, CBC News: The National: "Inside Fight Against COVID" | Mike Fly, Marianna Khoury, Michael Pierro and Morgan Waters, Baroness von Sketch Show: "Whatever You Do, Don't Smell His T-Shirts"; Aren Hansen, Kim's Convenience: "Couch Surfing"; Kyle Martin, Letterkenny: "Yard Sale Saturday"; Paul Winestock, Schitt's Creek: "Start Spreading the News"; Marianna Khoury, Workin' Moms: "To Lure a Squirrel" |
| Editing in a documentary program or series | Editing in a dramatic program or series |
| Carole Larsen, The Nature of Things: "She Walks with Apes"; Cathy Gulkin, 17 and Life Doesn't Wait; Jeff Warren, Assholes: A Theory; Cathy Gulkin, CBC Docs POV: "Company Town"; Michael Hannan, There Are No Fakes | Sandy Pereira, Cardinal: Until the Night: "Scott"; Hugh Elchuk, Cardinal: Until the Night: "John & Lise"; Paul Winestock, Departure: "Survivor"; Katie Chipperfield, Trickster: "Episode 102"; D. Gillian Truster, Trickster: "Episode 104" |
| Editing in a factual program or series | Editing in a reality or competition program or series |
| Craig Anderson, Cathy Gulkin, James Kinistino and Ken Yan, Every Child Matters; Liz Rosch, The Fifth Estate: "Murder in Your DNA"; Heath Fashina, David Rocco's Dolce Italia: "Hope in the New Rome"; Jenypher Fisher and Erin Parks, Jade Fever: "Heavy Lifting"; Jorge Parra, Still Standing: "Pelee Island, ON" | Andrew Gurney, Al Manson, Jeff Perry, Ken Yan, Stronger Together, Tous Ensemble; Andrew Gurney, Al Manson, Ryan Monteith, Jonathan Dowler, Jeff Perry and Curtis Rogers, Big Brother Canada: "Episode 11"; Jordan Wood, The Great Canadian Baking Show: "International Week"; Wesley Finucan, Baun Mah, Peter Topalovic, Great Chocolate Showdown: "The World Needs S'More People Like You"; Al Manson, Jonathan Dowler, Pat Fairbairn, Christina To and Terry Martindale, Top Chef Canada: "Final Showdown" |
| Production design/art direction in a fiction program or series | Production design/art direction in a non-fiction program or series |
| John Dondertman and Adam Prince, Trickster: "Episode 105"; Armando Sgrignuoli and Andrew Kawczynski, Frankie Drake Mysteries: "No Friends Like Old Friends"; Chris Crane, New Eden: "Go with Gaion"; Brendan Smith and Joe Susin, Schitt's Creek: "Happy Ending"; Trevor Smith, Bill Ives and Amber Humphries, Wynonna Earp: "Friends in Low Places" | Peter Faragher, Canada's Drag Race: "Eh-Laganza Eh-Xtravaganza"; Florian Schuck, Age of Samurai: Battle for Japan: "The Rise of Nobunaga"; Peter Faragher, Big Brother Canada: "Episode 1"; David Blanchard, The Detectives: "The Cottage Killer"; Richard Touch, Enslaved: The Lost History of the Transatlantic Slave Trade: "Follow the Money" |
| Sound in a fiction program or series | Sound in a non-fiction program or series |
| Jane Tattersall, Martin Lee, Ian Rankin, David McCallum, Claire Dobson, Dale Sheldrake, Steve Medeiros, Yuri Gorbachow, Sandra Fox, Kevin Shultz, Chelsea Body and Daniel Birch, Vikings: "The Best Laid Plans"; Robert Woolfson, Brennan Mercer, Jane Tattersall, Barry Gilmore, David McCallum, David Caporale, Martin Lee, Stacy Coutts, Jenna Dalla Riva, Sandra Fox and Jack Heeren, Cardinal: Until the Night: "John & Lise"; Jill Purdy, Adam Stein, Daniel Pellerin, Chris Russell and Roman Alexander Buchok, Coroner: "Fire, Pt. 2"; Janice Ierulli, Matthew Hussey, Geoff Younghusband, Hugo De La Cerda, Hilary Thomson and Matthew Thomson, Hudson & Rex: "Tunnel Vision"; Mike Markiw, Janice Ierulli, Matthew Hussey, Mark Shnuriwsky, Clive Turner, Sid Lieberman, Mike Woroniuk and Paul Shubat, Wynonna Earp: "Friends in Low Places" | Chris Jenkins, Sal Ojeda, Dave Draper, Alejandro Ramos Ariansen, Paul Corscadden, Brian Bentz, Max Phillips, Liam Able, Robert Carr, Robert Cooper, Michael Novitch, Stephan Carrier, Scott Hitchon, Paolo Amati, Adam Raley and Jack Madigan, Once Were Brothers: Robbie Robertson and The Band; John Diemer, Scott Brachmeyer, Daniel Hewett, Dane Kelly, Sarah Labadie, Carlo Scrignaro and Rob Taylor, Canada's Drag Race: "U Wear It Well"; Richard Spence-Thomas, Huan Nguyen, Phil Bax, Chris Miller, Peter Sawade, Ollie Machin, Mark Hatch, Marc Paquette, Gary Vaughan and Teresa Morrow, Enslaved: The Lost History of the Transatlantic Slave Trade: "New World Cultures"; Peter Sawade, Jane Tattersall, Sue Conley, Lou Solakofski and Jesse Fellows, CBC Docs POV: "Margaret Atwood: A Word after a Word after a Word is Power"; Matt Chan, Graham Rogers, Elma Bello, Michelle Irving and Chris Miller, Meat the Future |
| Sound in an animated program or series | Visual effects |
| Richard Spence-Thomas, Kyle Peters, Patton Rodrigues, Ryan Ongaro, Timothy Muirhead, Mitch Connors and Luke Dante, PAW Patrol: "Dino Rescue: Pups and the Lost Dino Eggs"; Brendan Quinn, Julian Rudd, Kevin Chamberlain, Scott McCrorie and Sebastian Biega, Abby Hatcher: "Fuzzly Beach Day"; Dan Kuntz and Jack Carter, The Magic School Bus Rides Again: "The Frizz Connection"; Ryan Araki, Simon Berry and Sue Robertson, Ollie's Pack: "Ollie in the House / The Ollie Files"; Jeff Davis, Fanny Riguidel, Stefan Seslija and Melanie Eng, Snoopy in Space: "Mission 6: Space Sleepwalking"; Brian Power, Matt Dawson, Jeremy Van Slyke, Zander Rosborough and Graham Colwell, Trailer Park Boys: The Animated Series: "The First Time We Smoked Weed" | Dominic Remane, Bill Halliday, Becca Donohoe, Leann Harvey, Tom Morrison, Ovidiu Cinazan, Jim Maxwell, Ezra Waddell, Warren Lawtey and Maria Gordon, Vikings: "The Best Laid Plans"; Greg Marshall, Karl Reichert, Mark Wong, Jordan Alaeddine and Amanda Grabenstetter, The Nature of Things: "A Bee's Diary"; Tom Plaskett, Lara Osland, Pavan Veeramaneni, Igor Garanovschii, Kevin Buessecker, Terence Krueger, Mohsin Kazi, David Rezek, Ramin Pournavab and Sawyer Tomkinson-Hunnef, Cardinal: Until the Night: "Robert"; Tom Plaskett, Tracy Grant, Dayna Pearce, Matt Philip, Mercedes Delgado, Janis Cudars, Chris Doe, Adam Smith, Sawyer Tomkinson-Hunnef and Jay Stanners, Trickster: "Episode 104"; Greg Behrens, Winston Lee and Dani Wall, Utopia Falls: "The World Is Yours" |

=== Directing ===
| Animated program or series | Children's or youth |
|---|---|
| Robin Budd, Hotel Transylvania: The Series: "What Lycidias Beneath"; Charles E. Bastien, PAW Patrol: "Dino Rescue: Pups and the Lost Dino Eggs"; Kyran Kelly, Abby Hatcher: "Fuzzly Beach Day"; Mark Thornton and Todd Kauffman, True and the Rainbow Kingdom: "Friendship Day"; Rich Weston, The Magic School Bus: "The Magic School Bus Rides Again: The Frizz Connection" | Warren P. Sonoda, Odd Squad Mobile Unit: "Music of Sound"; Stefan Brogren, Holly Hobbie: "The Salty Songstress"; Bruce McDonald, Malory Towers: "The Spider"; Jasmin Mozaffari, Holly Hobbie: "The Puzzled Peacemaker"; R. T. Thorne, Utopia Falls: "I Can Kick It" |
| Comedy | Documentary series |
| Andrew Cividino and Daniel Levy, Schitt's Creek: "Happy Ending"; Jordan Canning, Schitt's Creek: "Sunrise, Sunset"; Siobhan Devine, Kim's Convenience: "Beacon of Truth"; Catherine Reitman, Workin' Moms: "Charade"; Aleysa Young, New Eden: "Go with Gaion" | Omolola Ajao, Valerie Amponsah, Yasmin Evering-Kerr, Sharine Taylor, Adrian Wallace and Yvano Wickham-Edwards, Being Black in Toronto; Peter D. Findlay, CBC Docs POV: "Company Town"; Simcha Jacobovici, Ric Esther Bienstock and George Amponsah, Enslaved: The Lost History of the Transatlantic Slave Trade; Mark Starowicz and Caitlin Starowicz, The Nature of Things: "She Walks with Apes"; Lulu Wei, CBC Docs POV: "There's No Place Like This Place, Anyplace" |
| Documentary program | Drama series |
| Phyllis Ellis, Toxic Beauty; Nathalie Bibeau, The Walrus and the Whistleblower; Jamie Kastner, There Are No Fakes; Elizabeth St. Philip, 9/11 Kids; Rebecca Snow, Cheating Hitler: Surviving the Holocaust | Holly Dale, Transplant: "Pilot"; Cory Bowles, Diggstown: "Cheryl Battiste"; Adrienne Mitchell, Coroner: "Fire, Pt. 2"; Charles Officer, Coroner: "One Drum"; Mina Shum, Frankie Drake Mysteries: "Counterpunch" |
| Factual | Lifestyle or information |
| Sharon Lewis, Timothy Wolochatiuk, Tobin Long and Sebastian Cluer, Paranormal Nightshift: "Clown Boy's Revenge, She Follows Me, and I.T."; Andrika Lawren and Michael Margolis, Back in Time for Winter: "1950s"; Sharon Lewis, Timothy Wolochatiuk and Tobin Long, Paranormal Nightshift: "Night Radio, Lady in Red, and Spirit Alley"; Stephen Scott, Age of Samurai: Battle for Japan: "The Rise of Nobunaga"; Deborah Wainwright, The Oland Murder: "Dog in the Fight" | Cheryl Zalameda, Property Brothers: Forever Home: "Michelle & Chris"; Sebastian Cluer, Backyard Builds: "Sandra & David, Life Sized Sister Playhouse"; Natalie Lambert, Double Your Dish: "No Leftover Gets Left Behind!"; Dave Russell, 2019 Scotiabank Giller Prize; Frank Samson, Vikings: Worlds at War with ET Canada |
| Reality or competition program or series | TV movie |
| Shelagh O'Brien, Canada's Drag Race: "U Wear It Well"; Graeme Lynch, Landscape Artist of the Year Canada: "Midland Town Dock"; Dave Russell, Big Brother Canada: "Episode 1"; Dave Russell, The Great Canadian Baking Show: "The Great Canadian Holiday Baking Show"; Joan Tosoni, Battle of the Blades: "Premiere" | Sarah Pellerin, Glass Houses; Anne de Léan, Within These Walls; T.J. Heideman, La Bohème; Allen Kool, The Sanctuary; Caroline Labrèche, Rule of 3 |
| Variety or sketch comedy program or series | Live sporting event |
| Vivieno Caldinelli and Joyce Wong, Baroness von Sketch Show: "Whatever You Do, Don't Smell His T-Shirts"; Mathieu Baer, Aisha Brown: The First Black Woman Ever; Gillian Parker, Jann Arden One Night Only; Shelagh O'Brien, Jonathan Van Ness: Kicks; Jocelyn Corkum and Steve Wright, This Hour Has 22 Minutes: "How Dare You" | John Szpala, Hockey Night in Canada; Andy Bouyoukos, 2019 Grey Cup; Chris Elias, BMO Nations Cup |

=== Music ===
| Original music, fiction | Original music, non-fiction |
|---|---|
| Ari Posner, Amin Bhatia, Sarah Slean and Antonio Naranjo, Detention Adventure; Todor Kobakov, Cardinal: Until the Night; Trevor Morris, Vikings; Tom Third, Coroner | Darren Fung, The Nature of Things: "A Bee's Diary"; Janal Bechthold, CBC Docs POV: "Company Town"; Janal Bechthold, CBC Docs POV: "Cottagers and Indians"; Robert Carli, Toxic Beauty; Todor Kobakov, CBC Docs POV: "Margaret Atwood: A Word after a Word after a Word is Power" |
| Original music, animation | |
Ari Posner, Amin Bhatia, Kris Kuzdak and Chris Tait, Let's Go Luna!; Asher Lenz and Stephen Skratt, Corn & Peg; Asher Lenz and Stephen Skratt, Hotel Transylvania: The Series; Neil Parfitt, The Remarkable Mr. King; Meiro Stamm, Xavier Riddle and the Secret Museum

=== Writing ===
| Animated program or series | Children's or youth |
|---|---|
| Desmond Sargeant and Meghan Read, Xavier Riddle and the Secret Museum: "I Am Harriet Tubman"; Brent Butt and Jennifer Goodhue, Corner Gas Animated: "Pink Flood"; Brent Butt and Jennifer Siddle, Corner Gas Animated: "Remembers Only"; Andrew Carr, Corner Gas Animated: "Pact Rat"; Mark STeinberg, Hotel Transylvania: The Series: "What Lycidias Beneath" | Jessica Meya, Detention Adventure: "Hitting a Wall"; Alejandro Alcoba, Holly Hobbie: "The Puzzled Peacemaker"; J. J. Johnson and Christin Simms, Endlings: "The End is the Beginning is the End"; Karen McClellan, The Next Step: "The Comeback Kid"; Adam Peltzman and Stephanie Kaliner, Odd Squad Mobile Unit: "Mr. Unpredictable/Down the Tubes" |
| Comedy series | Drama series |
| Dan Levy, Schitt's Creek: "Happy Ending"; Leah Gauthier and Jennica Harper, Jann: "What Did Jann Do"; Jennica Harper, Jann: "The Tunies"; Anita Kapila, Kim's Convenience: "Which Witch Is Which"; Kurt Smeaton, Kim's Convenience: "Knife Strife" | Joseph Kay, Transplant: "Pilot"; Emily Andras, Wynonna Earp: "Friends in Low Places"; Sarah Dodd, Cardinal: Until the Night: "Adele"; Penny E. Gummerson, Cardinal: Until the Night: "Barry"; Penny E. Gummerson, Trickster: "Episode 105" |
| Documentary | Factual program or series |
| Phyllis Ellis, Toxic Beauty; Jamie Kastner, There Are No Fakes; Rebecca Snow, Cheating Hitler: Surviving the Holocaust; John Walker and Robert Sandler, Assholes: A Theory; Lulu Wei, There's No Place Like This Place, Anyplace | Jonny Harris, Fraser Young, Graham Chittenden and Steve Dylan, Still Standing: "Rankin Inlet"; Neil Grahn, Queen of the Oil Patch: "Girl Brain"; Al Kratina, Eric Sabbag and Alain Zaloum, The Detectives: "Mother and Son"; Greg Laikan, Kristian Olsen, Stephanie Rosloski and Deborah Wainwright, The Oland Murder: "Dog in the Fight"; Mark Sakamoto, Nik Sexton and Tom Stanley, Good People: "Between the Cracks" |
| Lifestyle or reality/competition program or series | TV movie |
| Mike Bickerton, Elvira Kurt and Jen Markowitz, Canada's Drag Race: "Welcome to the Family"; Luciano Casimiri, Stronger Together, Tous Ensemble; Elvira Kurt, The Great Canadian Baking Show: "Cake Week"; Carly Spencer, Landscape Artist of the Year Canada: "Midland Town Dock"; Tracie Tighe, Yette Vandendam and Molly Middleton, Dragons' Den: "DisruptDen Special" | Barbara Kymlicka, Glass Houses; Robin E. Crozier, The Sanctuary; James Phillips, Rule of 3; Andrea Stevens, Christmas Jars |
Variety or sketch comedy program or series
Carolyn Taylor, Meredith MacNeill, Aurora Browne, Jennifer Whalen, Jennifer Goodhue, Monica Heisey, Allison Hogg, Adam Christie, Becky Johnson, Nelu Handa and Paloma Nuñez, Baroness von Sketch Show: "I Prefer the Term 'Bonus Parent'"; Aisha Brown, Aisha Brown: The First Black Woman Ever; Heidi Brander, Mark Critch, Susan Kent, Adam Christie, Dean Jenkinson, Kevin Shustack, Jordan Foisy, Mayce Galoni, Aisha Brown, Brandon Hackett, Jon Blair, Sophie Buddle and Bob Kerr, This Hour Has 22 Minutes: "How Dare You"; Maggie Cassella, Katie Ford and David Kitching, We're Funny That Way: The Virtual Pride Special

== All-platform awards ==
One major category is currently presented without regard to the distinction between film, television or web media content.

Stunt Coordination
- Jean Frenette and Jean-François Lachapelle, Blood Quantum
- Randy Butcher, Trickster
- Tyler Hall, Goddess of the Fireflies (La déesse des mouches à feu)
- Dan Skene, Letterkenny

== Audience awards ==
Two major categories are presented based on online voting by fans through social media engagement.

| Audience Choice | Shaw Rocket Fund Kids' Choice |
|---|---|
| Melanie Scrofano (Wynonna Earp); Guled Abdi, Vance Banzo, Tim Blair and Franco Nguyen (TallBoyz); Bryan Baeumler and Sarah Baeumler (Island of Bryan); Arisa Cox (Big Brother Canada); Giacomo Gianniotti (Grey's Anatomy); Sangita Patel (Home to Win, ET Canada); Priyanka (Canada's Drag Race); Maitreyi Ramakrishnan (Never Have I Ever); Chantel Riley (Frankie Drake Mysteries); Graham Wardle (Heartland) | Wild Kratts; All-Round Champion; Anaana's Tent; Dino Ranch; Holly Hobbie; Odd Squad; PAW Patrol; The Next Step; True and the Rainbow Kingdom; Utopia Falls |

== Digital media ==
| Web Program or Series, Fiction | Web Program or Series, Non-Fiction |
|---|---|
| Bit Playas; The Amazing Gayl Pile; Decoys; Hey Lady!; NarcoLeap | Canada's a Drag; Dark Cloud: The High Cost of Cyberbullying; Love Letters from Everest; My Trans Journey; Pride: The LGBTQ+ History Series |
| Lead Performance, Web Program or Series | Supporting Performance, Web Program or Series |
| Jayne Eastwood, Hey Lady!; Lisa Michelle Cornelius, Band Ladies; Nigel Downer, Bit Playas; Kaniehtiio Horn, Ghost BFF; Heidi Lynch, Avocado Toast; Vanessa Matsui, Ghost BFF; Kris Siddiqi, Bit Playas; Perrie Voss, Avocado Toast | Tricia Black, Band Ladies; Angela Asher, Ghost BFF; Kristian Bruun, Avocado Toast; Tracey Hoyt, Decoys; Priyanka, Drag Ball presented by Crave; Jackie Richardson, Hey Lady!; Mag Ruffman, Avocado Toast; Jean Yoon, Ghost BFF |
| Interactive Production | Host, Web Program or Series |
| The 2010s: The Decade Canadian Artists Stopped Saying Sorry; Communities Create; Endlings: Origin; Home4School | Andrew Phung, 2019 Canadian Improv Games; Ali Hassan and Peter Keleghan, #CanFilmDay Live; Kenny Hotz and Spencer Rice, Kenny & Spenny: Paldemic; Traci Melchor, Drag Ball presented by Crave; Tracy Moore, Live: #CityLineReal on Race |
| Direction, Web Program or Series | Writing, Web Program or Series |
| Adriana Maggs, Sarah Polley and Will Bowes, Hey Lady!: "Episode 3"; Ant Horasanli, The Runner: "Episode 8"; Allison Johnston, Bit Playas: "Comic Con"; Celeste Koon, Love Letters from Everest; Samir Rehem, Bit Playas: "Final Fight" | Kris Siddiqi and Nigel Downer, Bit Playas: "Auditions"; Morris Panych, Hey Lady!: "Episode 3"; J. J. Johnson, Nicole Stamp and Christin Simms, Lockdown: "Social Togetherness"; Lakna Edilima, Lockdown: "Stake Outing"; Jonathan Torrens, Your Two Cents: "The Cashelor" |
| Immersive Experience | Video Game Narrative |
| The Book of Distance — Randall Okita, David Oppenheim, Anita Lee; The Holy City — Nimrod Shanit, Sean Thomas Evans; In the Land of the Flabby Schnook (Au pays du cancre mou) — Francis Gélinas, Francis Monty, Catherine Cyr, Saule Gélinas, Lileina Joy, Monique Thomas, Daniel Judson, Michèle Paquin, Natasha Vallée-Martin, Olivier Rousseau, Maude Paré, Anne-Marie Robert, Christina Robinson, Gabrielle Leblanc, Marc-André Paquin, Mathieu Dufresne, Éric Guérin; Space Explorers: The ISS Experience — Félix Lajeunesse | We Happy Few: We All Fall Down — Alex Epstein, Lisa Hunter, Mark Slutsky; Later Daters — Miriam Verburg; LOVE – A Puzzle Box Filled with Stories — Jim Squires, Shane McCafferty; Spiritfarer — Nicolas Guérin; Star Renegades — Ken Seto |
Live Production, Social Media
CBC Kids Kindie Grad Class of 2020 Facebook Live Event — Stefani Walsh, Kevin Naulls, Hallae Khosravi, Carly Watt, Emily Houghton, Jason Hopley, Michelle Runowski, Lisa Wisniewski, Mia Rodak; #BellLetsTalk Live — Chris Perez, Melissa Grelo, Beth Maher, Sandy Lok; 2020 Polaris Music Prize — Ben Aylsworth, Justin Taylor, Steve Johnston, Claire Dagenais; etalk Live from the Oscars Balcony — Chris Perez, Beth Maher, Michelle Crespi, Danielle Graham, Elaine Lui, Amber Buchanan, Devin Mandeville; LIVE: #CityLineReal on Race — Tracy Moore, Laura Reiter, Sandy Chronopoulos, Diana Dotto, Stephanie Henry, Cassandra Juradinho, Talia Knezic, Kyle Mack
