= Maxwell Smart =

Maxwell Smart may refer to:

- Maxwell Smart (fictional character), from the television series Get Smart
- Maxwell Smart, a Holocaust survivor and subject of the 2019 documentary Cheating Hitler: Surviving the Holocaust and the 2023 film The Boy in the Woods
- Maxwell Smart, stage name of record producer Max Perry
