= Community One Foundation =

Canadian LGBTQ non-profit organisation

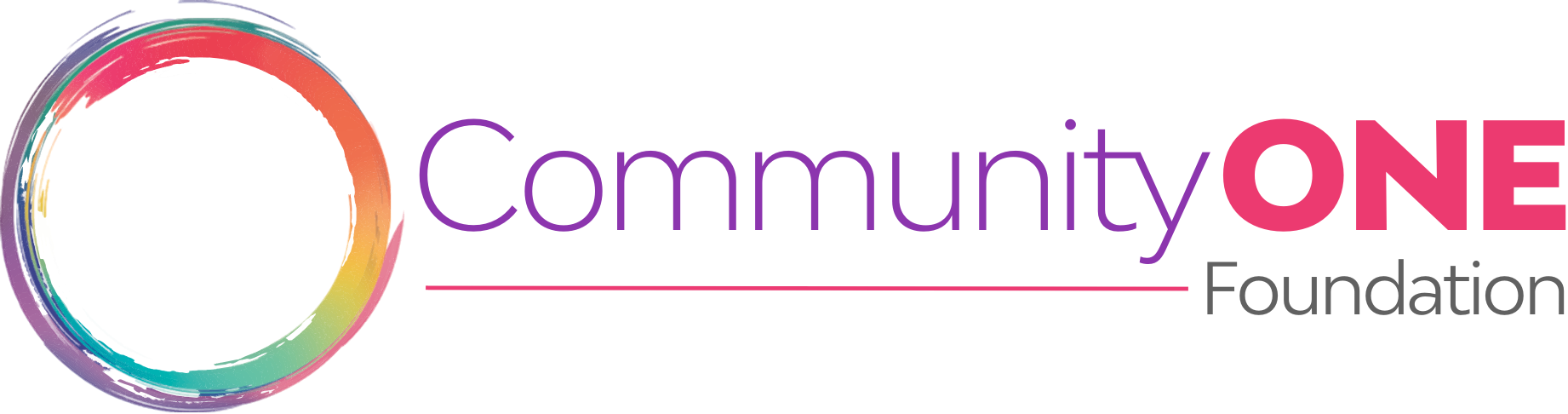
Logo for Community One Foundation

Community One Foundation, formerly the Lesbian & Gay Community Appeal, is a non-profit foundation based in Toronto, Ontario, Canada, that builds and supports individuals and groups that enhance the development of the LGBTTIQQ2S communities in the Greater Toronto Area, including Durham, Halton, Peel and York Regions.

In 1980, the Lesbian & Gay Community Appeal of Toronto (LGCA) was founded by a group of Toronto activists led by Harvey Hamburg, Tom Beechy, Rosemary Barnes and others. The LGCA was a response to the lack of financial support for community projects and organizations. The appeal raised funds through an annual giving program and by holding special initiatives. Their mandate includes funding for projects and programs in the areas of education, health, human rights, and arts and culture.

In 2008, the LGCA became the Community One Foundation to recognize the ever-evolving and diverse community that the foundation serves and to promote the need for unity and philanthropy in the community.

Since its inception, the Community One Foundation's volunteers and donors have raised funds to support projects that have strengthened the LGBTTIQQ2S community through the annual Rainbow Grants program. The foundation is a public foundation and registered charity, operating primarily through individual donations, with the exception of the RBC Community Rainbow Grant and the Steinert & Ferreiro Award.

The foundation is the subject of Lulu Wei's 2023 documentary film Supporting Our Selves.
