= Band Ladies =

Canadian comedy web series

Band Ladies is a Canadian comedy web series, which premiered in 2020 on Highball TV. The series centres on five adult women who feel restless and in need of change in their lives as they approach age 40, and decide to turn their book club into a punk rock band after a video of them drunkenly singing together goes viral on the internet.

The five main characters are Chloe (Lisa Michelle Cornelius), Marnie (Kate Fenton), Cindy (Vicki Kim), Penny (Dana Puddicombe) and Stephanie (Kirsten Rasmussen). The cast also includes Tricia Black, Kris Siddiqi, Natasha Negovanlis and Ishan Davé.

The series was written by Fenton and Puddicombe, and directed by Molly Flood.

The series received two Canadian Screen Award nominations at the 9th Canadian Screen Awards in 2020, for Best Lead Performance in a Web Program or Series (Cornelius) and Best Supporting Performance in a Web Program or Series (Black). Black won the award for Best Supporting Performance.
