= Justin Haber =

Maltese footballer and convicted sex offender (born 1981)

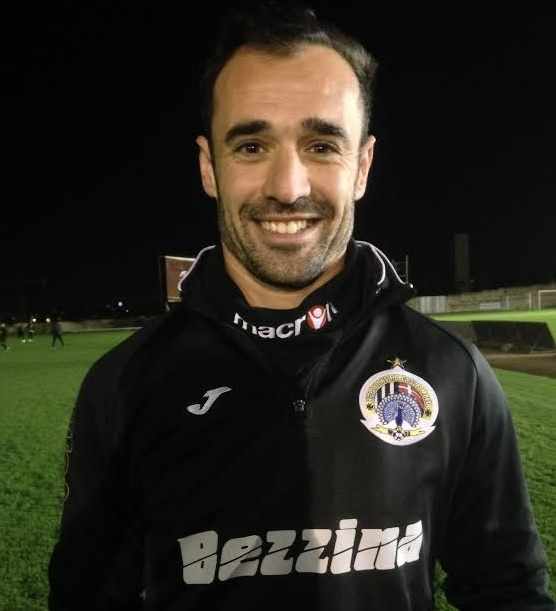
- Haber with Hibernians in 2016

Personal information
- Date of birth: 9 June 1981 (age 45)
- Place of birth: Floriana, Malta
- Height: 1.80 m (5 ft 11 in)
- Position: Goalkeeper

Team information
- Current team: Hibernians
- Number: 24

Youth career
- Floriana

Senior career*
Years	Team	Apps	(Gls)
1998–2002	Floriana	23	(0)
1998	→ Dobrudzha (loan)	3	(0)
2002–2005	Birkirkara	74	(0)
2005–2006	US Quevilly	27	(0)
2006	RE Virton	5	(0)
2006–2007	Marsaxlokk	7	(0)
2007–2008	Chaidari	15	(0)
2008–2010	Sheffield United	0	(0)
2009	→ Ferencváros (loan)	2	(0)
2009	→ Ferencváros II (loan)	2	(0)
2010–2011	Ferencváros	10	(0)
2010–2011	Ferencváros II	8	(0)
2011–2012	Kerkyra	0	(0)
2012–2013	Mosta	18	(0)
2013–2016	Birkirkara	87	(0)
2016	Hibernians	12	(0)
2016–2017	Floriana	26	(0)
2017–2022	Gżira United	71	(0)
2022	Santa Lucia	13	(0)
2022–2023	Hibernians	11	(0)
2023	Marsaxlokk	0	(0)
2024–2025	Gżira United	2	(0)
2025–2025	Żabbar St. Patrick	1	(0)
2025–2025	Hibernians	3	(0)

International career^{‡}
2004–2016	Malta	54	(0)
- * Club domestic league appearances and goals as of 6th October 2025 ‡ National team caps and goals as of 21 August 2015

Justin Haber (born 9 June 1981) is a former Maltese professional footballer, former Labour councillor for Floriana, former businessman, and convicted sex offender who last played as a goalkeeper for Maltese Premier League club Hibernians and formerly played with the Malta national football team.

== Football career ==
=== Floriana ===
Born in Floriana, Malta, Haber started his football career at Floriana F.C. During his three-year spell at Floriana, he made 23 appearances and was later sent on loan to a Bulgarian top division team Dobrudzha Dobrich.

=== Birkirkara ===
Justin then joined Birkirkara in 2002, and stayed with the club until 2005. Haber was a vital member of the team, gaining him 74 caps.

=== US Quevilly ===
Towards the end of 2005, Haber joined French-side US Quevilly, where he gained 27 caps.

=== Marsaxlokk ===
In 2006, Haber moved back to Malta to join Marsaxlokk FC for the 2006–07 season. He managed to help the small seaside club to win its first ever Maltese Championship.

=== Haidari ===
In June 2007, it was announced that Haber had joined Greek side Haidari FC on a two-year contract. The club is based in a suburban town close to Athens and participates in the Greek Second Division.

=== Sheffield United ===
In July 2008 Haber joined Sheffield United on a two-year deal. Haber had previously undergone a trial during United's 2006–2007 season in the Premier League, however, then manager Neil Warnock decided not to offer the Maltese keeper a contract In August 2009, after failing to break into the Blades first team, Haber was allowed to join their sister club Ferencváros on loan until the end of the year.

=== Ferencváros ===
In January of the following year Haber signed an 18-month contract with Ferencvárosi. He was a regular first team pick, and in the 2010–11 season he helped his team become third place, and a chance to play in the Europa League.

=== Kerkyra ===
Haber signed a two-year deal with Greek Super League club Kerkyra on 5 July 2011.

Justin Haber with Birkirkara

=== Birkirkara ===
In 2012, he returned to Malta to play for Birkirkara. He famously participated in the Birkirkara vs West Ham UEFA Europa League qualifier in the 2015–16 season.

=== Żabbar St. Patrick ===
In 2025, he joined Żabbar St. Patrick in a short-term contract from Gżira United. It's also during this time he would resign from the Floriana Local Council, his contract expired near the end of the year.

=== Hibernians ===
On 20 August 2025, Haber joined Hibernians on a free transfer for his third spell at the club. His contract with Hibernians was terminated upon his conviction the same day for sexual harassment of a minor.

== Restaurant owner ==
In 2008, Haber opened a seafood restaurant in Marsaxlokk called Haber 16, with the holding company Haber 16 Ltd. On 20 February 2020, Haber 16 was featured on the Netflix series Restaurants on the Edge. The restaurant was later closed and replaced by Harbour by Johann.

== Political career ==
Haber contested the 2024 local council elections and was elected to the Floriana local council with Partit Laburista. Haber resigned from the local council the next year following a conviction for threatening to behead his sister.

== Legal issues ==
In November 2023, Haber was ordered to pay money to a partner company who invested in his Marsaxlokk restaurant. The partner, Delta 3 Finance and Investments Company, claimed they had to pay off debts of both the restaurant and Haber himself.

In May 2025, Haber was found guilty of threatening his sister, where he sent text messages threatening to "cut her [...] head off". A restraining order was issued against Harber in his sister's defence for one year.

In October 2025, Haber was found guilty of sexually harassing a 14-year-old girl who worked at his restaurant, reportedly groping her buttocks and forcefully kissing her. He was given a suspended sentence and placed on the sex offender's register. Haber filed an appeal which was rejected by the court in November 2025.
