= Philip Demers =

Canadian marine mammal trainer

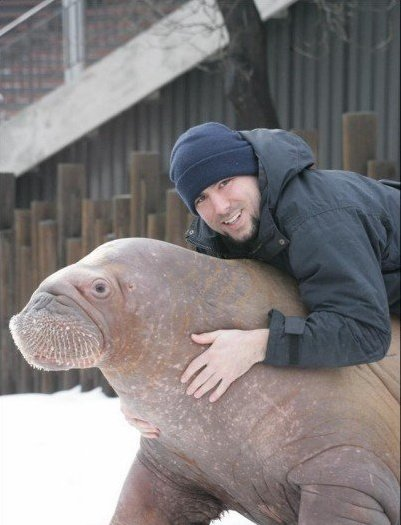
- Demers with Smooshi the walrus c. 2010
- Born: Philip Demers; March 21, 1978 (age 47); Welland, Ontario, Canada
- Occupation(s): Former animal trainer, mailman
- Years active: 2000–2012 (employment); 2007-present (activism)

Philip Demers (born March 21, 1978) is a Canadian former professional marine mammal trainer at Marineland of Canada in Niagara Falls, Ontario. He is best known for his relationship with a captive walrus named Smooshi.

== Career ==
Demers' animal training career began in 2000 at MarineLand where he was employed until August 2012. In 2007, Demers became the focus of mass media attention regarding his unique relationship with a captive Pacific walrus named Smooshi. Their relationship garnered the attention of such television programs as CBC's The National, Inside Edition, and Jimmy Kimmel Live!. Demers left his position at Marineland citing allegations of negligent treatment of the animals and unhealthy conditions. As of fall 2022 they have reached a non-costs agreement where the walrus Smooshi and her calf Koyuk would be rehomed.

A news article on 10 August 2017 stated that the park had filed a total of nine lawsuits against activists, former employees and the media since 2012. None of the suits has been resolved in court. On the same date, all of the 11 charges laid by the OSPCA for animal cruelty against Marineland were dropped by the prosecutor who believed that there was no hope of convictions on eight of them. Demers expressed his disappointment: "My jaw's on the floor. It always is. I've tempered my expectations, especially when it comes to this justice system, and especially with the OSPCA. Quite frankly, I find them completely useless."

Later in the day on 10 August, updated news reports added insights as to alternative proposed by the Crown Attorney: the public interest would be better served by a system of ongoing monitoring of the animals' condition at the park.

Demers was a contestant on Wipeout Canada, winning the first episode of the show.

Demers is also featured in Nathalie Bibeau's documentary film The Walrus and the Whistleblower, which screened at several film festivals, including Hot Docs and the Toronto International Film Festival. Since leaving Marineland, Demers has worked part-time as a mailman.
