= Wild Archaeology =

Canadian documentary television series

Wild Archaeology is a Canadian documentary television series, which premiered in 2016 on the Aboriginal Peoples Television Network. The series profiles various archaeological projects to investigate and recover the ancient history of the indigenous peoples of Canada.

The series received a Canadian Screen Award nomination for Best Factual Program or Series at the 9th Canadian Screen Awards in 2021.
