= Rob Yang =

American actor

- Born: Chicago, Illinois, U.S.
- Occupation: Actor
- Years active: 2007–present
- Known for: Succession; The Resident

Rob Yang is an American actor known for his role as Lawrence Yee on Succession (2018–2019) and as Logan Kim on The Resident (2019–2021). Yang has also appeared in numerous television shows and films, including Twisted (2013), The Americans (2016), and Living with Yourself (2019). He starred in the 2022 off-Broadway production of Catch as Catch Can.

== Early life ==
Yang was born into a Korean-American family and grew up in the Chicago metropolitan area.

== Filmography ==
=== Film ===
Year	Title	Role	Notes
2007	Algeny: The Genetic Factor	Makoto	
2008	Pretty to Think So	Alex Yuen	
2008	Make Yourself at Home	Peter Kim	
2008	The Unidentified	Walker	
2009	2B	Expert #5	
2009	Lenox Avenue	Mr. Reed	
2009	Did You Hear About the Morgans?	Jake	Uncredited
2009	2k3	Park	
2010	Then There's the Afterlife	Rob	
2011	The Adjustment Bureau	Junior Partner	
2011	The Pill	The Pharmacist	
2011	Certainty	Fred	
2012	Lola Versus	Student	
2012	The Bourne Legacy	C-Team Member	
2014	Listen Up Philip	Boyfriend On Stoop	
2014	Match	Jim	
2014	All Relative	Ven	
2015	True Story	Young Man	
2015	Stockholm, Pennsylvania	Mr. Henry	
2015	3 Generations	Rental Car Clerk	Uncredited
2016	The Secrets of Emily Blair	District Attorney Corman	
2016	A Bear Lands on Earth	Jay	
2019	Glass	Heo Byung-Woo	
2019	The Kitchen	Jeffrey Kahn	
2019	The Wisdom Tooth	Dr. Herrell	
2022	The Hater	Scott Park	
2022	The Menu	Bryce	
2025	Terrestrial	The Collector	
2025	She Rides Shotgun	Detective John Park	
2027	A Place in Hell	TBA	Post-production

=== Television ===
Year	Title	Role	Notes
2007, 2010	Law & Order: Criminal Intent	Dornan / Eddie Choi	2 episodes
2009, 2026	Law & Order	Assistant Medical Examiner Morean / Defense Attorney Max Wood	2 episodes
2009	Possible Side Effects	Chen	Television film
2010	Mercy	X-Ray Tech	2 episodes
2010	Gravity	Ken	Episode: "Dogg Day Afternoon"
2010	Bored to Death	Peter	3 episodes
2011	Gossip Girl	Hotel Manager	Episode: "The Kids Are Not All Right"
2011	Suits	Technician	Episode: "Pilot"
2011	One Life to Live	Dr. Degroff	12 episodes
2011	The Big C	Asian Man	Episode: "The Darkest Day"
2012	The Good Wife	Bao Shuwei	Episode: "Bitcoin for Dummies"
2012	Don't Trust the B— in Apartment 23	Moving Man	Episode: "Pilot"
2012	Nurse Jackie	Rumpled Suit Man	Episode: "One-Armed Jacks"
2013	Twisted	Principal Mark Tang	4 episodes
2013	The Blacklist	Jin Sun	Episode: "Wujing (No. 84)"
2014	Castle	Dr. McLean	Episode: "Driven"
2015–2016	Adam Ruins Everything	Dr. Yang	2 episodes
2016	The Grinder	Neal	Episode: "The Olyphant in the Room"
2016	The Americans	Don Seong	4 episodes
2016	New Girl	Hugh	Episode: "Single and Sufficient"
2017	An American Girl Story: Ivy & Julie 1976 - A Happy Balance	Sam Ling	Television film
2017	The Sinner	Scott	Episode: "Part V"
2017	Madam Secretary	President Kenatbek Nogoyev	2 episodes
2018	Maniac	Matt Ming	Episode: "Windmills"
2018–2019	Succession	Lawrence Yee	Main role; 6 episodes
2019	Ryan Hansen Solves Crimes on Television	Nate	2 episodes
2019	Living with Yourself	Left / Youngsu	3 episodes
2019–2021	The Resident	Logan Kim	13 episodes
2021	The Now	Joon-Ho	5 episodes
2021–2024	American Rust	Deputy Steve Park	Main role
2022	The Capture	Yan WangLei	3 episodes
2023	Rabbit Hole	Edward Homm	8 episodes
2023	American Horror Stories	Dr. Thaddeus Lau	Episode: "Tapeworm"
2026	The Beauty	Dr. Ray Lee	Recurring role
2026	CIA	Harry Tan	Episode: "Broken Glass"
2026	Criminal Minds	District Attorney Emory Joy	Episode: "Body Count"
2026	Furious	FBI Agent Frank Choi	
TBA	Bishop †	TBA	1 episode

Key
†	Denotes television productions that have not yet been released

=== Video games ===
Year	Title	Role	Notes
2008	Midnight Club: Los Angeles	Chung Hee	
2009	Grand Theft Auto: The Ballad of Gay Tony	Triad Member	
2013	Grand Theft Auto V	Hao	
2013	Grand Theft Auto Online	Hao	

== Theater ==
Year	Title	Role	Notes
2009	The Shanghai Gesture	Lin Chi	Off-Broadway
2012	A Midsummer Night's Dream	Peter Quince	Off-Broadway
2015	Chimerica	Zhang Lin	Studio Theatre (Washington, D.C.)
2022	Catch as Catch Can	Tim / Theresa	Playwrights Horizons
2026	Data	Alex	Regional, Arena Stage

== See also ==
- Korean Americans in New York City
