= Foxtrott =

- Birth name: Marie-Hélène Leclerc Delorme
- Genres: Alt pop electronic music
- Years active: 2012-present
- Labels: One Little Indian Records

Foxtrott is the recording name of Canadian electronic music artist Marie-Hélène Leclerc Delorme.

Foxtrott's first significant release was her self-released EP Shields in 2012 before signing to One Little Indian Records, which released her full-length debut album A Taller Us in 2015.

A Taller Us was a longlisted nominee for the 2016 Polaris Music Prize.

Foxtrott released her second album "Meditations I-II-III" in 2018.

Delorme received a Canadian Screen Award nomination for Best Original Song at the 9th Canadian Screen Awards in 2021, for her song "Timid Joyous Atrocious" from the film Sugar Daddy.

== Discography ==
- Shields (2012)
- A Taller Us (2015)
- Meditations (2018)
