= Cayenne (film) =

- Directed by: Simon Gionet
- Written by: Simon Gionet
- Produced by: Simon Gionet
- Starring: Marianne Fortier; Jean-Sébastien Courchesne
- Cinematography: François Herquel
- Edited by: Simon Gionet
- Music by: Paloma B. Daris
- Release date: February 1, 2020 (Clermont-Ferrand)
- Running time: 11 minutes
- Country: Canada

Cayenne is a Canadian short drama film, directed by Simon Gionet and released in February 2020.

== Plot ==
During her shift at a remote gas station, a female clerk ventures in the night to fix a man's broken car, unsure if she should have trusted him.

== Accolades ==
Year	Festival	Award/Category	Status	Ref
2020	Saguenay International Short Film Festival	Canadian Grand Prize	Won	
2020	Minikino Film Week	Best Fiction Short	Won	
2020	2020 Cinéfest Sudbury International Film Festival	Audience Choice for Best Short Film	Won	
2021	9th Canadian Screen Awards	Best Live Action Short Drama	Nominated	
