= Jamie Kastner =

Canadian screenwriter and film director

- Occupations: Film director, screenwriter
- Known for: There Are No Fakes, The Secret Disco Revolution, The Skyjacker's Tale

Jamie Kastner is a Canadian writer, director and documentary filmmaker based in Toronto, Canada. His company, Cave 7 Productions, produces both theatrical and television productions. Kastner is best known for his feature documentaries, including There Are No Fakes, which premiered at Hot Docs in 2019, The Skyjacker's Tale (2016) and The Secret Disco Revolution, both of which premiered at the Toronto International Film Festival.

== Career ==
Jamie Kastner is a member of a family of filmmakers. He is the nephew of actor Peter Kastner and filmmaker John Kastner. Kastner's grandmother, Rose, served as an associate producer on several of John Kastner's films, while his mother, Susan Kastner, was involved in the production of several of Jamie Kastner's films as a researcher. Kastner's wife Laura Baron Kastner is producer and business partner at Cave 7 Productions. Kastner worked as an associate producer and researcher on several of John Kastner's films, including 1997's Hunting Bobby Oatway.

Jamie Kastner's films explore such topics as pop culture, political and social issues, crime and identity. His first documentary was Free Trade Is Killing My Mother (2003), a black comedy about protest. Films such as Djangomania! (2005), Kike Like Me (2007) and Recessionize! For Fun and Profit! (2011) employ both comedy and a first-person, road movie format. Kike Like Me, which follows Kastner as he travels to several countries exploring the notion of modern Jewish identity, premiered at HotDocs in 2007. The film won the Audience Award at Munich Dokfest and was shortlisted for the Grierson Award in 2008.

Kastner has also worked as a producer and writer on several television series, as a newspaper reporter and features writer, playwright, critic and television host.

In 2017, The Harold Greenberg Fund supported the adaptation of The Skyjacker's Tale into a dramatic feature film, titled, The Skyjacker's Son, with Kastner as screenwriter.

== Filmography ==
- Free Trade Is Killing My Mother (2003)
- Djangomania! (2005)
- Kike Like Me (2007)
- Ancestors in the Attic (2010, TV series; episode "Slavery Roots")
- Recessionize! For Fun and Profit! (2011)
- The Secret Disco Revolution (2012)
- The Skyjacker's Tale (2016)
- D-Day in 14 Stories (2019)
- There Are No Fakes (2019)
- Nobody Wants to Talk About Jacob Appelbaum (2024)
- The Spoils (2024)

== Awards ==
Award	Date of ceremony	Category	Result	Reference
Canadian Screen Awards	May 20, 2021	Direction in a Documentary Program or Series	Nominated	
Canadian Screen Awards	May 20, 2021	Writing in a Documentary Program or Series	Nominated	
Canadian Screen Awards	May 20, 2021	Biography or Arts Documentary Program or Series	Nominated	
