= Mother of All Shows =

2023 feature film directed by Melisa D'Agostino

- Directed by: Melissa D'Agostino
- Written by: Melissa D'Agostino; David James Brock
- Produced by: Matt Schichter
- Starring: Wendie Malick; Melissa D'Agostino; Juan Chioran
- Cinematography: Gaelen Cook
- Edited by: Matt Campagna
- Music by: Music Composed by Rebecca Everett. Songs written by David James Brock; Melissa D'Agostino; Rebecca Everett
- Production company: Goldstrike Films
- Release date: June 1, 2023
- Running time: 110 minutes
- Country: Canada
- Language: English

Mother of All Shows is a 2023 musical feature film directed by Melissa D'Agostino, and written by David James Brock and Melissa D'Agostino. The film stars D'Agostino as Liza Mangiani, a woman who is processing the imminent death of her mother Rosa (Wendie Malick) by imagining their lives through the prism of a 1970s television variety show.

== Cast ==
- Wendie Malick as Rosa Mangiani
- Melissa D'Agostino as Liza Mangiani
- Tara Consoli as Lisa Mangiani
- Darryl Hinds as Alan Hart
- Michael Miranda as Gus Mangiani
- Ann Pornel as Peg
- Trevor Martin as Bruce
- Phil Luzi as Tony
- Juan Chioran as Bradberry Ignacio James III

== Filming ==
Mother of All Shows was shot in Ontario in January 2022, and was Melissa D'Agostino's feature directorial debut.

== Release ==
The film premiered on June 1, 2023, as the opening night film 2023 Art of Brooklyn festival. It had its Canadian premiere at the 2024 Kingston Canadian Film Festival.

The film has been picked up for distribution in the United States by Gravitas Ventures with a release date of July 16, 2024, with the Canadian release scheduled for the same date on Highball TV.

== Awards ==
The film received two Canadian Screen Award nominations at the 12th Canadian Screen Awards, for Best Original Song (D'Agostino, Brock and Rebecca Everett for "Mothers and Daughters, Daughters and Moms") and Best Hair (Rikki Zucker).
