= Love Letters from Everest =

2019 Canadian film directed by Celeste Koon

- Directed by: Celeste Koon
- Written by: Celeste Koon
- Produced by: Shasha Nakhai
- Narrated by: Celeste Koon
- Edited by: Rich Williamson
- Music by: Rob Teehan
- Animation by: Anna Bron, Andrew Whyte
- Distributed by: CBC Gem
- Release date: October 2019 (Doc NYC)
- Running time: 8 minutes
- Country: Canada
- Language: English

Love Letters from Everest is a Canadian short animated documentary film, directed by Celeste Koon and released in 2019. The film centres on the love letters written between Koon's grandparents, Fritz Müller and Barbara Battle, during Müller's 1956 research expedition to Mount Everest. The roles of her grandparents are voiced by Jakob Josten and Laura Meadows.

The film premiered at the Doc NYC festival in October 2019, and had its Canadian premiere in February 2020 on CBC Gem.

The film received two Canadian Screen Award nominations at the 9th Canadian Screen Awards in 2021, for Best Web Program or Series, Non-Fiction and Best Direction in a Web Program or Series (Koon).
