= Elizabeth St. Philip =

Elizabeth St. Philip is a Canadian documentary filmmaker, most noted for her 2020 film 9/11 Kids.

She was formerly a producer for CTV News, who worked on both CTV National News and W5. She made her debut as a filmmaker in 2010 with the short documentary film The Colour of Beauty, about Black women in fashion modelling.

She joined Blue Ant Media as a producer in 2022, later joining TVOntario in 2023 as director of program development in 2023. Also in 2023 she directed Inside the Statue Wars, a documentary which aired on the CBC Television series The Passionate Eye.

== Awards ==
Award	Date of ceremony	Category	Work	Result	Ref.
Canadian Screen Awards	2016	Best News or Information Segment	W5: "Gordie's Comeback" with Avis Favaro, Jerry Vienneau, Brian Mellersh, André Lapalme	Nominated	
Canadian Screen Awards	2021	Donald Brittain Award	9/11 Kids with Steve Gamester, Michael Kot, Betty Orr	Won	
Canadian Screen Awards	2021	Best Direction in a Documentary Program	9/11 Kids	Nominated	
Canadian Screen Awards	2024	Donald Brittain Award	The Passionate Eye: "Inside the Statue Wars" with Steve Gamester, Yuma Dean Hester, Michael Kot	Nominated	
Hot Docs Canadian International Documentary Festival	2020	Rogers Audience Award	9/11 Kids	Won	
