= Muller Ice Shelf =

Former ice shelf in Antarctica

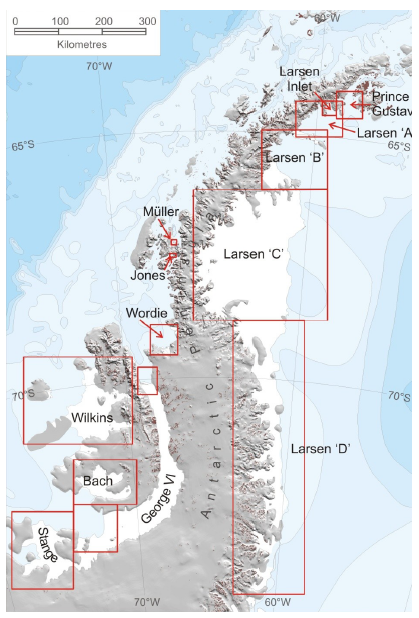
The ice shelves of the Antarctic peninsula

Muller Ice Shelf, also known as Müller Ice Shelf according to the original German spelling of the family name Müller, (67°15′S 66°52′W) was an ice shelf lying southwest of Hooke Point in southwest Lallemand Fjord, Arrowsmith Peninsula, Loubet Coast. It was nurtured by Brückner Glacier and Antevs Glacier.

It collapsed "recently" (as at late March 2008).

The name was given by United Kingdom Antarctic Place-Names Committee (UK-APC) in 1981 in memory of Fritz Muller (1926–80), a Swiss glaciologist, who carried out research in Switzerland, Greenland, the Canadian Arctic, and the Himalayas.
