= Christmas Jars =

2019 film directed by Jonathan Wright

- Genre: Drama; Christmas
- Based on: Christmas Jars by Jason F. Wright
- Written by: Andrea Stevens
- Directed by: Jonathan Wright
- Starring: Jeni Ross; Markian Tarasiuk
- Theme music composer: Christopher Guglick
- Country of origin: Canada
- Original language: English

Production
- Producers: Jesse Prupas; Jonas Prupas; Shane Boucher; Andra Johnson Duke; Michael A. Dunn; Barry McLerran; Misha Solomon
- Cinematography: Michael Tien
- Editor: Mark Arcieri
- Running time: 110 minutes
- Production company: Muse Entertainment Enterprises

Original release
- Network: Citytv
- Release: December 2019

Christmas Jars is a Canadian television film, directed by Jonathan Wright and released in 2019 in partnership with free streaming service BYUtv. Based on the 2005 novel by Jason F. Wright, the film stars Jeni Ross as Hope Jensen, a journalist investigating a phenomenon of jars of money being anonymously left on the doorsteps of needy families as Christmas gifts.

The film's cast also includes Markian Tarasiuk as Hope's love interest Ian Maxwell.

The film was shot near Ottawa in early 2019. It premiered in December 2019 on BYUtv in the United States, and Citytv in Canada.

The film won the Canadian Screen Award for Best TV Movie at the 9th Canadian Screen Awards in 2021. Ross and Tarasiuk received nominations for Best Performance in a Television Movie, and Andrea Stevens was nominated for Best Writing in a TV Movie.

== See also ==
- List of Christmas films
