= There's No Place Like This Place, Anyplace =

- Film poster
- Directed by: Lulu Wei
- Produced by: Ali Weinstein
- Starring: Kathleen Conway; Deborah Cowen; Mike Layton
- Cinematography: Lulu Wei
- Edited by: Sarah Bachinski
- Music by: Laura Barrett
- Release date: May 28, 2020 (Hot Docs)
- Running time: 75 minutes
- Country: Canada
- Language: English

There's No Place Like This Place, Anyplace is a 2020 Canadian documentary film, directed by Lulu Wei. The film profiles the issue of gentrification in Toronto, Ontario through the history, demolition and redevelopment of the historic Honest Ed's department store and its effects on the larger Mirvish Village neighbourhood.

Stories woven through the film include those of Wei and their partner as they navigate the process of looking for a new place to live after being "renovicted" from their current Mirvish Village apartment; Itah Sadu, the owner of the city's Black Canadian specialty bookstore A Different Booklist, as she lobbies to secure a space for her store in the new development; an artist and gallery owner who takes the loss of his existing location as an opportunity to retire from the business rather than attempting to relocate; and the efforts of anti-poverty activists and city councillor Mike Layton to secure a larger affordable housing component in the new development.

The film premiered as part of the 2020 Hot Docs Canadian International Documentary Festival. Due to the COVID-19 pandemic in Canada, it was not screened theatrically, but premiered as part of the festival's online streaming component.

An abbreviated edition of the film was broadcast by CBC Television as an episode of CBC Docs POV in October 2020.

== Awards ==
On June 8, the film was named as one of five recipients of the Rogers Audience Award at Hot Docs, alongside the films The Walrus and the Whistleblower, 9/11 Kids, First We Eat and The Forbidden Reel. Although it was not the overall winner of the audience balloting, in light of the pandemic situation and its ongoing effects on film distribution, the award committee opted to split the award among all of the top five Canadian films.

Wei received two Canadian Screen Award nominations in television categories at the 9th Canadian Screen Awards in 2021, for Best Direction in a Documentary Program or Series and Best Writing in a Documentary Program or Series.
