= Good People (Canadian TV series) =

Canadian documentary television series

- Genre: Documentary
- Created by: Mark Sakamoto
- Country of origin: Canada

Good People is a Canadian television documentary series, which premiered in 2020 on CBC Gem. Created and hosted by author Mark Sakamoto, each episode focuses on a persistent social problem such as homelessness, gun violence, issues faced by military veterans, the proliferation of garbage or the opioid crisis, and profiles the efforts of various individuals and communities to find innovative new solutions.

The series received two Canadian Screen Award nominations at the 9th Canadian Screen Awards in 2021, for Best Factual Program or Series and Best Writing in a Factual Program or Series (Sakamoto, Nik Sexton and Tom Stanley for the episode "Between the Cracks").
