= Sugar Daddy (film) =

2020 Canadian film directed by Wendy Morgan

- Film poster
- Directed by: Wendy Morgan
- Written by: Kelly McCormack
- Produced by: Lori Lozinski; Lauren Grant; Kelly McCormack
- Starring: Kelly McCormack; Colm Feore
- Cinematography: Kristin Fieldhouse
- Edited by: Christine Armstrong
- Music by: Marie-Hélène Delorme
- Production companies: Clique Pictures; Violator Films; Floyder Films
- Distributed by: LevelFilm; Blue Fox Entertainment
- Release date: December 1, 2020 (Whistler)
- Running time: 98 minutes
- Country: Canada
- Language: English

Sugar Daddy is a 2020 Canadian drama film, directed by Wendy Morgan. The film stars Kelly McCormack as Darren, a talented but struggling young singer-songwriter who decides to sign up for a paid dating service to make extra money.

The film has its world premiere at the 2020 Whistler Film Festival, and was nominated for three Canadian Screen Awards, winning two.

== Plot ==
The film follows Darren, a 20-something fledgling musician who signs up for a paid dating service to fund her creative projects.

She endures regular young person struggles. She faces strain in her relationship with her roommate, her sister, and for a time, her mother. In one encounter, she and her friends debate the ethics of paid dating, prostitution, and dating a wealthier partner.

She intermittently is playing instruments and mixing music and working on creative projects. She buys herself a lavish item- a lap steel guitar.

She goes on a series of dates, on which, surprisingly she does not face serious physical danger or assault.

Referred by her casual friend, music producer Angus (Aaron Ashmore), she attempts to record vocals in a seedy studio for an unknown rap artist. Nancy (Amanda Brugel), a trusted figure she met briefly, appears in the studio and even lets her sing whatever she wants, something original. But Darren gets a taste of bitter medicine when Nancy, who is head of the label, rejects her. This is not so much for her lack of talent, but inexperience in navigating the personalities of the industry.

She forms a special connection with one client, Gordon (Colm Feore). He is generally caring and thoughtful toward her on their dates. They get to know each other a little bit and he learns about her aspirations. Near the end of the film, one night Darren decides to have sex with Gordon. The next morning he leaves her a check for $100,000, presumably to sponsor her creative endeavors.

Later, Darren encounters Gordon and Angela out to dinner together and loudly confronts him about the nature of the payment.

Darren cashes the check and gets herself a large loft apartment. She mends her damaged relationship with her sister and mother and creates an elaborate music and performance art project.

== Cast ==
- Kelly McCormack as Darren
- Colm Feore as Gordon
- Amanda Brugel as Nancy
- Aaron Ashmore as Angus
- Nicholas Campbell as Jim
- Noam Jenkins as Edward
- Ishan Davé as Peter
- Hilary McCormack as Rae
- Kaniehtiio Horn as Jenny
- Jess Salgueiro as Angela
- Tony Nappo as Don
- Rob Stewart as Bill
- Michelle Morgan as Sarah
- Andy McQueen as Jeffrey
- Roger Barnes as Law Office Boss
- Paula Boudreau as Kathy
- Richard Blackburn as Uncle Max
- Carmelita Blondet as Shop Owner
- Amrish Patel as Dan
- Natalie Boutari as Don's Girlfriend
- Vickie Papavs as Linda
- Kevin Claydon as Kyle
- Jennifer Hui as Stephanie
- Ted Jefferies as Businessman
- Khadijah Roberts-Abdullah as Tanish
- Richard Walters as Danny

== Release and awards ==
The film premiered at the 2020 Whistler Film Festival, where McCormack received an honorable mention for the Borsos Competition award for best performance in a Canadian film, and won the One to Watch award.

The film received three Canadian Screen Award nominations at the 9th Canadian Screen Awards in 2021, for Best Supporting Actor (Feore), Best Editing (Christine Armstrong), and Best Original Song (Marie-Hélène L. Delorme for "Timid Joyous Atrocious").

Morgan won the DGC Award for Best Direction in a Feature Film from the Directors Guild of Canada in October 2021.

== Reception ==
On review aggregator Rotten Tomatoes, the film has a score of 100% based on reviews from 19 critics, with an average 7.8/10 rating. Based on 5 critics on Metacritic, the film have a score of 78 out of a 100, indicating "generally favorable reviews".

Amil Niazi of The Globe and Mail wrote "Sugar Daddy will be gripping viewing for anyone who wonders what it takes to make it - and whether it's all worth it in the end".

Bobby LePire of Film Threat praised the film's "outstanding writing, stylish, dazzling direction, and a breathtaking, radiant performance from Kelly McCormack", adding that "the drama never lets the audience go and proves to be a searing examination of its young protagonist and the society she lives in".
