= The World Is Bright =

2019 film by Ying Wang

- Directed by: Ying Wang
- Written by: Ying Wang; Lawrence Le Lam
- Produced by: Ying Wang; Su Jian Ping; Jordan Paterson
- Cinematography: Pieter Stathis; Su Jian Ping; Ying Wang; Rui Qiang Tang; Peng Yin
- Edited by: Lawrence Le Lam; Ying Wang
- Music by: Daniel Ross
- Production companies: gYu Films International; Picture's Up Media
- Distributed by: Moving Images Distribution
- Release date: September 29, 2019 (VIFF)
- Running time: 116 minutes
- Country: Canada
- Languages: English; Mandarin

The World Is Bright is a Canadian documentary film, directed by Ying Wang and released in 2019.

The film centres on Qian Hui Deng and Xue Mei Li, a couple from China whose son Shi Ming committed suicide soon after emigrating to Canada, focusing both on their long campaign to understand the circumstances of his death and the mental health struggles often faced by immigrants due to their social, linguistic and cultural isolation from their new surroundings.

The film premiered at the 2019 Vancouver International Film Festival, where it won the award for best film in the Sea to Sky program. It was subsequently screened at the 2020 Hot Docs Canadian International Documentary Festival, where Wang won the Emerging Canadian Filmmaker Award award.

The film received two Canadian Screen Award nomination for Best Feature Length Documentary and Best Editing in a Documentary (Lawrence Le Lam) at the 9th Canadian Screen Awards in 2021.
