= Being Black in Toronto =

Canadian documentary series

Being Black in Toronto is a Canadian documentary series, which was broadcast by CBC Gem in 2020. The series consisted of six short documentary films by emerging Black Canadian filmmakers from Toronto, who had been mentored through Fabienne Colas's Being Black in Canada foundation.

The six films shown in the series were Omolola Ajao's "YYZ", Valerie Amponsah's "Joseph, Margaret & I", Yasmin Evering-Kerr's "The Onyx Butterfly", Sharine Taylor's "Tallawah Abroad", Adrian Wallace's "Black Sun" and Yvano Wickham-Edwards's "#BLACK". A further four short films by filmmakers from Halifax were also subsequently broadcast under the title Being Black in Halifax.

The filmmakers won the Canadian Screen Award for Best Direction in a Documentary Series at the 9th Canadian Screen Awards in 2021.
