= Tricia Black =

Canadian actress, writer and comedian

- Born: August 7, 1986 (age 40); Saint John, New Brunswick
- Education: Mount Allison University, The Second City
- Occupations: Actress, Comedian

Tricia Black is a Canadian actress, writer and comedian. She is most noted for her role in the 2020 web series Band Ladies, for which she won the Canadian Screen Award for Best Supporting Performance in a Web Program or Series at the 9th Canadian Screen Awards in 2021, and her voice role in the 2022 animated series Summer Memories, for which she won the Canadian Screen Award for Best Performance in an Animated Program or Series at the 11th Canadian Screen Awards in 2023.

== Early life ==
Originally from Quispamsis, New Brunswick, she is an alumna of The Second City's Toronto company, for which she was one of the writers and performers of the Canadian Comedy Award-winning LGBTQ-themed comedy show Extravaganza Eleganza in 2019.

== Career ==
Black has also been associated with Toronto sketch comedy troupe The Sketchersons, and has had supporting or guest appearances in the television series New Eden, Kim's Convenience, What We Do in the Shadows, Baroness von Sketch Show and Pretty Hard Cases. She can also be seen in feature films like The Broken Hearts Gallery, The Man from Toronto, and as Norris in the film Dear David.

== Filmography ==
=== Film ===
Year	Title	Role	Notes
2020	The Broken Hearts Gallery	Goodwill Worker	
2022	My Fake Boyfriend	Peyton	
2022	The Man from Toronto	Car Rental Assistant	
2022	Zombies 3	Zombie Announcer	
2023	Bad Behind Bars: Jodi Arias	Donovan Bering	
2023	World's Best	Sportscaster	Cameo
2023	Suze	Tanice	
2023	Dear David	Norris	

=== Television ===
Year	Title	Role	Notes
2013	The Camp	Abby	Television film
2019–2020	Baroness von Sketch Show	Various roles	3 episodes
2020	New Eden	Prison Gang Woman	Episode: "Forbidden Fruit"
2020	Band Ladies	Kaley Wolfe	4 episodes
2020	What We Do in the Shadows	Young Familiar	Episode: "Collaboration"
2020	Latinas Wanted	Katie	Episode: "Latinas Wanted"
2021	Ghosts	Channelle	Episode: "D&D"
2021	1 Queen 5 Queers	Panelist	Episode: "Family"
2021–2023	Pretty Hard Cases	Det. Tara Swallows	16 episodes
2022	Slo Pitch	Benji	Episode #2.8
2022	In the Dark	Lucy	2 episodes
2022	Locke & Key	Officiant	Episode #3.2
2022–present	Summer Memories	Jason	Voice role; 20 episodes.
2023	The Horror of Dolores Roach	Paramedic #1	Episode #1.1
2024	Stories from My Gay Grandparents	Dax	Six episodes
2025	Wayward	Mule	8 Episodes
2026	The Miniature Wife	Hel	4 episodes
