= Lisa Michelle Cornelius =

Canadian actress

Lisa Michelle Cornelius is a Canadian actress. She is most noted for her role in the web series Band Ladies, for which she was a Canadian Screen Award nominee for Best Lead Performance in a Digital Program or Series at the 9th Canadian Screen Awards in 2021.

== Career ==
Cornelius has appeared in supporting or guest roles in the film The Best Man Holiday, the television series Black Mirror, 12 Monkeys, American Gothic and The Handmaid's Tale. and the web series Star Trek: Short Treks.

She is the former co-chair of ACTRA's diversity and inclusion committee.

== Filmography ==
=== Film ===
Year	Title	Role	Notes
2013	The Best Man Holiday	Reality Show Star	Uncredited
2019	Tangle	Tonisha Lewis	
2022	Beginner's Luck	Pretty Woman	
2022	Pattern	Mia	
2023	Out of My Mind	Rose's Mom	

=== Television ===
Year	Title	Role	Notes
2005	Kevin Hill	Kevin's Young Mom	Episode: "A River in Egypt"
2013	Satisfaction	Bridesmaid #1	Episode: "Save the Date"
2013	Horizon	Betty	Television film
2014	Max & Shred	Horror Movie Actor	Episode: "The Stalefish Double Flip"
2016	American Gothic	Police Officer at Tunnel	Episode: "Arrangement in Grey and Black"
2017	The Handmaid's Tale	UN Volunteer	Episode: "Night"
2017	Flint	Nurse #1	Television film
2017	How to Buy a Baby	Samantha	Episode: "Fertilifear"
2017	Black Mirror	School Yard Teacher	Episode: "Arkangel"
2018	12 Monkeys	Frightened Parent	Episode: "One Minute More"
2019	Star Trek: Short Treks	Sarah	Episode: "The Trouble with Edward"
2019	Twinkle All the Way	Kim Donaldson	Television film
2020	Band Ladies	Chloe	6 episodes
2020	Love in Harmony Valley	Tanya	Television film
2020	A Christmas Carousel	Nicole	Television film
2021	Galentine's Day Nightmare	Detective Baily	Television film
2021	Hero Elementary	Park Ranger (voice)	Episode: "Sara Loses Her Snap; A Soupie Mystery"
2021	Color of Love	Jordana Bridges	Television film
2021	The Parker Andersons	Charlotte	Episode: "A Home for Harvey"
2021	Chucky	Mom	Episode: "Cape Queer"
2021	A Sisterly Christmas	Vicky Marshall	Television film
2022	Murdoch Mysteries	Minerva West	Episode: "The Witches of East York"`
2022	Hudson & Rex	Kate Miller	Episode: "Dog Days Are Over"
2023	Robyn Hood	Tressie Loxley	6 episodes
2023	Blue's Clues & You!	Fire Chief Frankie	Episode: "Firefighter Blue to the Rescue!"
2024	Operation Mistletoe	Mayor Sami	Television film
2024	Barney's World	Mrs. Lewis (voice)	Main role
