= The Secret Disco Revolution =

- Film poster
- Directed by: Jamie Kastner
- Written by: Jamie Kastner
- Produced by: Jamie Kastner
- Narrated by: Peter Keleghan
- Cinematography: Derek Rogers
- Edited by: Greg West
- Music by: Jamie Shields; David Wall; Adam B. White
- Production company: Cave 7 Productions
- Distributed by: Screen Media Films
- Release date: September 8, 2012 (TIFF)
- Running time: 90 minutes
- Country: Canada
- Language: English

The Secret Disco Revolution is a Canadian documentary film, directed by Jamie Kastner and released in 2012. Profiling the disco genre of music and the club culture surrounding it, the film is structured around academic Alice Echols's thesis that the genre played an important role in spurring advances in gender, racial and LGBTQ equality in the late 1970s and 1980s.

Figures appearing in the film include Thelma Houston, Gloria Gaynor, Martha Wash and members of The Village People.

The New York Times said "It's so clever that it makes fun of itself with a mock connecting narrative." Dennis Harvey of Variety criticized the film for that narrative framing, particularly Kastner's use of three fictional characters who are presented as deliberately orchestrating the creation and rise of the genre. He also wrote that while the overall thesis was reasonable, it sometimes stretched into implausibility, particularly when it posited Donna Summer's single "Love to Love You Baby" as an ode to the female orgasm. Daniel Pratt of Exclaim! also criticized the framing device, calling it confusing and offputting, and writing that "letting the text speak for itself, with a bit of clever editing, would have been far more effective."

The film premiered at the 2012 Toronto International Film Festival. It was subsequently acquired for theatrical distribution by Screen Media Films, and had a theatrical run in 2013.
