= The Walrus and the Whistleblower =

2020 Canadian documentary film

- Film poster
- Directed by: Nathalie Bibeau
- Written by: Nathalie Bibeau; Christina Clark
- Produced by: Nathalie Bibeau; Frederic Bohbot
- Starring: Phil Demers
- Cinematography: Christian Bielz
- Edited by: Vincent Guignard
- Music by: Anaïs Larocque; Raphael Reed
- Production company: Bunbury Films
- Release date: May 28, 2020 (Hot Docs)
- Running time: 89 minutes
- Country: Canada
- Language: English

The Walrus and the Whistleblower is a 2020 Canadian documentary film directed by Nathalie Bibeau. The film profiles Phil Demers, a former employee of Marineland who attempted to blow the whistle on allegedly inhumane treatment of animals at the institution.

The film was made in association with the Documentary Channel and CBC Docs. The Documentary Channel's announcement about the film stated that Demers had "appeared four times on the Joe Rogan show, has testified before the Canadian Senate, and is being sued for $1.5 million for plotting to steal Smooshi, the walrus".

The film premiered as part of the 2020 Hot Docs Canadian International Documentary Festival. Due to the COVID-19 pandemic in Canada, it was not screened theatrically, but premiered as part of the festival's online streaming component and aired on CBC Television on May 28 as part of the network's special Hot Docs at Home series of films from the festival.

In June 2020, the film was named as the winner of 2020 Rogers Audience Award, alongside the films 9/11 Kids, There's No Place Like This Place, Anyplace, First We Eat and The Forbidden Reel, and as Overall Favourite at Hot Docs. The Audience Award allowed the film to be fast tracked in the Academy Award for Best Documentary Feature category, "provided it meets all other criteria for eligibility". Northern Banner, a division of Raven Banner Entertainment, subsequently announced that it had acquired the rights to distribute the film in Canada, probably starting before year end. The US and international distribution rights went to Gravitas Ventures.

The film received a nomination for the Donald Brittain Award at the 9th Canadian Screen Awards in 2021.

== See also ==
- Blackfish
