= Ishan Davé =

Canadian actor

- Born: November 7, 1989 (age 37); Thornhill, Ontario, Canada
- Occupation: Actor
- Years active: 2004–present
- Known for: Kim's Convenience

Ishan Davé (born November 7, 1989) is a Canadian actor known for his roles in Rabbit Hole, Kim's Convenience, and Degrassi: The Next Generation. His first acting job was as a teenager in the television series Renegadepress.com, for which he was nominated twice for a Gemini Award.

Davé lives in Toronto and is a graduate of the National Theatre School of Canada. He has performed in solo and group theatre shows, and was a member of the NAC English Theatre Ensemble. He is of East Indian and Gujarati descent.

== Filmography ==
=== Film ===
Year	Title	Role	Notes
2020	Sugar Daddy	Peter	

=== Television ===
Year	Title	Role	Notes
2004–2008	Renegadepress.com	Sandi Bhutella	
2005–2006	Degrassi: The Next Generation	Linus	
2017–2021	Kim's Convenience	Raj Mehta	
2019	Slasher	Detective Pujit Singh	
2020	Band Ladies	Chad	
2023	Rabbit Hole	Hafiz	
TBA	Bishop †	Inspector Ashish Rai	

Key
†	Denotes television productions that have not yet been released
