= 9/11 Kids =

- Film poster
- Directed by: Elizabeth St. Philip
- Written by: Elizabeth St. Philip; Greg West; Steve Gamester
- Produced by: Elizabath St. Philip; Steve Gamester
- Cinematography: Chris Romeike
- Edited by: Greg West
- Production company: Saloon Media
- Distributed by: Blue Ant Media
- Release date: April 23, 2020 (Hot Docs)
- Running time: 88 minutes
- Country: Canada
- Language: English

9/11 Kids is a 2020 Canadian documentary film, directed by Elizabeth St. Philip. The film profiles the ongoing effects of the September 11 attacks on the United States through the stories of the now young adults who were in the classroom where President George W. Bush was reading the grade-school level reading exercise "The Pet Goat" when he was interrupted and informed of the attacks.

The film premiered as part of the 2020 Hot Docs Canadian International Documentary Festival. Due to the COVID-19 pandemic in Canada, it was not screened theatrically, but premiered as part of the festival's online streaming component and aired on CBC Television on April 23 as part of the network's special Hot Docs at Home series of films from the festival.

On June 8, the film was named as one of five recipients of the Rogers Audience Award, alongside the films The Walrus and the Whistleblower, There's No Place Like This Place, Anyplace, First We Eat and The Forbidden Reel. In light of the pandemic situation and its ongoing effects on film distribution, the award committee opted to split the award among all of the top five Canadian films.

The film won the Donald Brittain Award for best social or political documentary at the 9th Canadian Screen Awards in 2021.
