= The Skyjacker's Tale =

- Directed by: Jamie Kastner
- Written by: Jamie Kastner
- Produced by: Jamie Kastner
- Starring: Ishmael Muslim Ali
- Cinematography: Derek Rogers
- Edited by: Jorge Parra
- Music by: Jamie Shields; David Wall; Adam B. White
- Production company: Cave 7 Productions
- Distributed by: A71 Entertainment; Strand Releasing
- Release date: September 10, 2016 (TIFF)
- Running time: 75 minutes
- Country: Canada
- Language: English

The Skyjacker's Tale is a Canadian documentary film, directed by Jamie Kastner and released in 2016. The film centres on Ishmael Muslim Ali (formerly Ishmael LaBeet), who was convicted of murder in the Fountain Valley massacre of 1972 and imprisoned before hijacking a plane to Cuba in 1984. It mixes interviews, including the first interview given by Ali himself since the incident, with dramatic reenactments of the hijacking.

The film premiered at the 2016 Toronto International Film Festival. It was acquired by Strand Releasing for release in the United States in 2017.

The film received a Canadian Screen Award nomination for Best Cinematography in a Documentary (Derek Rogers) at the 5th Canadian Screen Awards.
