= Lawrence Le Lam =

Canadian film and television editor

- Occupations: Film and television editor; filmmaker
- Known for: The World Is Bright (2019); Cypher
- Awards: Best Short Film (Vancouver Short Film Festival, 2018); Best Period Piece (Hollyshorts Film Festival, 2018)

Lawrence Le Lam is a Canadian film and television editor. He is noted for his work on the 2019 film The World Is Bright, for which he was a Canadian Screen Award nominee for Best Editing in a Documentary at the 9th Canadian Screen Awards in 2021.
