= Bit Playas =

Canadian comedy web series

Bit Playas is a Canadian comedy web series, which premiered in 2019 on CBC Gem. It stars Nigel Downer and Kris Siddiqi as Leon and Ahmed, two aspiring actors who find that their status as people of colour relegates them to bit parts. Series episode runtime is 9–16 minutes.

Bit Playas received six Canadian Screen Award nominations at the 9th Canadian Screen Awards in 2021, for Best Fiction Web Program or Series, Best Lead Performance in Web Program or Series (2: Downer, Siddiqi), Best Direction in a Web Program or Series (2: Allison Johnston for the episode "Comic Con" and Samir Rehem for the episode "Final Fight") and Best Writing in a Web Program or Series (Siddiqi and Downer for the episode "Auditions"). It won the awards for Best Fiction Web Program or Series and Best Writing in a Web Program or Series.

== Episodes ==
1. "Auditions"
2. "Shopping Day"
3. "Privilege Theatre"
4. "Dads"
5. "Becky's"
6. "Comic Con"
7. "D&D"
8. "Final Fight"
