= Enslaved (TV series) =

2020 British-Canadian television documentary series

- Also known as: Enslaved: The Lost History of the Transatlantic Slave Trade (Ireland), Enslaved with Samuel L Jackson (UK)
- Genre: Television documentary
- Directed by: Simcha Jacobovici
- Country of origin: Canada / United Kingdom
- Original language: English
- No. of seasons: 1
- No. of episodes: 6 (4 in UK)

Production
- Executive producers: Samuel L. Jackson, LaTanya Jackson, Eli Selden, Rob Lee, Simcha Jacobovici, Ric Esther Bienstock, Sarah Sapper and Yaron Niski
- Producers: Sarah Sapper, Ric Esther Bienstock, Felix Golubev
- Camera setup: Single-camera
- Production companies: Cornelia Street Productions, Associated Producers

Original release
- Network: Epix (USA); Documentary Channel (Canada)
- Release: September 14, 2020

Enslaved is a British-Canadian television documentary series that premiered in 2020. The series explores various aspects of the history of slavery in the United States, including the efforts of American actor Samuel L. Jackson to reconnect with his African heritage through DNA testing, diving projects to locate and recover shipwrecks in which at least two million African people captured by slave traders died before ever reaching North America, and explorations of the impact of the Atlantic slave trade on economics, politics and culture through to the present day.

Also featuring Guardian journalist Afua Hirsch as co-presenter with Jackson, the series was created by Simcha Jacobovici and Yaron Niski, directed by Jacobovici and produced by Ric Esther Bienstock, Sarah Sapper and Felix Golubev.

The series was broadcast in fall 2020 on BBC Two in the United Kingdom, CBC Television in Canada and Epix in the United States. In spring 2021, the series was broadcast on RTE 2 in the Republic of Ireland.

Enslaved won the Canadian Screen Award for Best History Program or Series at the 9th Canadian Screen Awards in 2021.
