= There Are No Fakes =

- Directed by: Jamie Kastner
- Written by: Jamie Kastner
- Produced by: Jamie Kastner; Laura Baron Kastner
- Starring: Kevin Hearn
- Cinematography: Derek Rogers
- Edited by: Michael Hannan
- Music by: Kevin Hearn
- Production company: Cave 7 Productions
- Distributed by: Mongrel Media
- Release date: April 29, 2019 (Hot Docs)
- Running time: 113 minutes
- Country: Canada
- Language: English

There Are No Fakes is a Canadian documentary film, directed by Jamie Kastner and released in 2019. Starting with musician Kevin Hearn's lawsuit against the Maslak McLeod Gallery after being informed that a Norval Morrisseau painting he had purchased appeared to be a forgery, the film expands into an exposé of a significant art fraud ring that has produced many fake Morrisseau paintings through the use of forced child labour in sweatshops, in which some of Morrisseau's own surviving family members are complicit; by some estimates, there may be up to 10 times as much fake Morrisseau art on the market as real work.

At the time of the film's release, Hearn's lawsuit had been dismissed by the courts on the grounds that he could not definitively prove that the painting was fake; in September 2019, the decision was overturned by the Ontario Court of Appeal, which awarded Hearn $60,000 on the grounds that the legal onus was actually on the gallery owner to prove that the painting was real, which he also could not do.

The film premiered at the Hot Docs Canadian International Documentary Festival in 2019. It received selected other theatrical screenings through 2019, including at the Art Gallery of Ontario in Toronto, the Glenbow Museum in Calgary and the Thunder Bay Art Gallery in Thunder Bay. It had its television premiere on TVOntario on February 1, 2020.

== Reception ==
Critical reception to the film was varied. The Winnipeg Free Press says that despite being "overly long" at points, it is "a stunning picture of colonial exploitation and stolen Indigenous patrimony". The Globe and Mail described There Are No Fakes as "a shocking tale of counterfeit art, sexual abuse and colonialist exploitation."

L.A Hawbaker offered in their review for PopMatters that Kastner uses There Are No Fakes to emphasize the fact that those benefitting from Morriseau's work were white men. They then go on to say that "the crimes that took place at the Bingwi reserve are just a small sampling of the societal harm done to indigenous populations in Canada".

In 2023, the Ontario Provincial Police filed for a court order demanding that Kastner turn over all of the film's raw footage in order to assist in their investigation.

== Awards ==
Award	Date of ceremony	Category	Nominees	Result	Reference
Canadian Screen Awards	May 20, 2021	Biography or Arts Documentary Program or Series	Jamie Kastner, Laura Baron Kastner, Mark Anthony Jacobson	Nominated	
Canadian Screen Awards	May 20, 2021	Editorial Research	Laura Baron Kastner, Allya Davidson, Joanne Loton	Nominated	
Canadian Screen Awards	May 20, 2021	Photography in a Documentary Program or Factual Series	Derek Rogers	Nominated	
Canadian Screen Awards	May 20, 2021	Editing in a Documentary Program or Series	Michael Hannan	Nominated	
Canadian Screen Awards	May 20, 2021	Direction in a Documentary Program or Series	Jamie Kastner	Nominated	
Canadian Screen Awards	May 20, 2021	Writing in a Documentary Program or Series	Jamie Kastner	Nominated	
Banff Rockie Awards	June 14, 2021	Documentary and Factual - Arts and Entertainment	Cave 7 Productions	Nominated	
