= Simon Gionet =

Canadian writer and filmmaker

- Born: Quebec City, Quebec
- Occupation(s): writer, director
- Years active: 2018–present

Simon Gionet is a French Canadian film director. He is most noted for his short film Cayenne (2020), which was a Canadian Screen Award nominee for Best Live Action Short Drama at the 9th Canadian Screen Awards.

== Biography ==
Simon Gionet was born in Quebec City. He is a graduate of Mel Hoppenheim School of Cinema and co-founder of Littoral Films, a production company focused towards fiction filmmaking.

He currently lives in Montreal.
