= Rabbit Hole (TV series) =

American spy thriller television series

- TV release poster
- Genre: Drama; Spy thriller
- Created by: Glenn Ficarra; John Requa
- Starring: Kiefer Sutherland; Meta Golding; Enid Graham; Rob Yang; Walt Klink; Charles Dance
- Composer: Siddhartha Khosla
- Country of origin: United States
- Original language: English
- No. of seasons: 1
- No. of episodes: 8

Production
- Executive producers: Glenn Ficarra; John Requa; Charles Gogolak; Hunt Baldwin; Kiefer Sutherland; Suzan Bymel
- Producers: Norman Bender; Michael J. Ballin; Thomas Ray Aguilar; Nick Pavonetti
- Production location: Canada
- Running time: 42–56 minutes
- Production companies: Zaftig Films; Entertainment 360; CBS Studios

Original release
- Network: Paramount+
- Release: March 26 – May 7, 2023

Rabbit Hole (stylized as Rabbit/Hole) is an American spy thriller television series created by John Requa and Glenn Ficarra for Paramount+. The series stars Kiefer Sutherland as a private espionage agent framed for murder. The series aired from March 26 to May 7, 2023. In October 2023, the series was cancelled after one season.

== Premise ==
John Weir is a corporate spy adept at deception and ruining lives. In his last mission, a mysterious cabal turns the table on him and gives him a taste of his own medicine by framing him for a murder, and he finds himself in a cat-and-mouse game for gaining his freedom.

== Cast ==
=== Main ===
- Kiefer Sutherland as John Weir
- Meta Golding as Hailey Winton
- Enid Graham as FBI Special Agent Josephine "Jo" Madi
- Rob Yang as Edward Homm
- Walt Klink as The Intern/Kyle
- Charles Dance as Dr. Ben Wilson

=== Recurring ===
- Jason Butler Harner as Miles Valence
- Jed Rees as Manfred Larter
- Ishan Davé as Hafiz
- Wendy Makkena as Debra
- Peter Weller and Lance Henriksen as Crowley
- Mark Winnick as Young Crowley
- Maia Jae Bastidas as Eliza Wells

== Episodes ==
No.	Title	Directed by	Written by	Original release date
1	"Pilot"	Glenn Ficarra & John Requa	Glenn Ficarra & John Requa	March 26, 2023
John Weir (Kiefer Sutherland) is a paranoid corporate espionage consultant whose life spirals out of control. The episode starts with Weir at a confession with a priest. Three weeks before that, Weir orchestrates a stock market scam by faking news reports, causing a rug pull for his client. When FBI agent Jo Madi (Enid Graham) investigates, Weir brushes her off and continues his work with Arda Analytics, led by his friend Miles Valence (Jason Butler Harner). Together, they fabricate evidence linking a major company to corruption by a US Treasury Department official to sweep off allegations of child slavery. Weir soon realizes he's being watched by a mysterious woman named Hailey (Meta Golding) and a blue Mercedes-Benz. As events unravel, Weir is framed for murder when Valence manipulates evidence and then kills himself. Weir is forced to flee and becomes a fugitive. In a final scene, his supposed victim and the Treasury Department figure he framed, Edward Homm (Rob Yang), is seen alive and captive in Weir's basement.
2	"At Any Given Moment"	Glenn Ficarra & John Requa	Glenn Ficarra & John Requa	March 26, 2023
In flashbacks from 1981, a young Weir is trained by his father, Ben (Charles Dance), who then removes the phone line for security. Subsequent flashbacks detail Ben's supposed death and a man claiming he was killed fighting for his country. In the present, Detective Madi investigates a fire scene but is rebuffed by Rasche (Noam Jenkins) until the discovery of a survivor. Hailey is approached by impersonators, but Weir intervenes and abducts her. Unable to get information on the blue Mercedes-Benz, Weir ties her in his trunk and drives to his childhood home, finding Homm there, alive but bound. Weir and Hailey then tail a Valence co-worker, who reveals Valence's case was a set-up to frame Weir for Homm's murder. He names the orchestrator as "he's everywhere" and confirms that access to information needs Miles' authenticator and password from police evidence. Posing as an FBI agent, Weir breaks into the precinct. However, the survivor steals the authenticator and attacks Weir before Hailey runs him down. The episode concludes with the revelation that the old man threatening Homm at Weir's house is his father, Ben, who is still alive.
3	"The Algorithms of Control"	Glenn Ficarra & John Requa	Glenn Ficarra & John Requa	April 2, 2023
4	"The Person in Your Ear"	Jon Cassar	Hunt Baldwin	April 9, 2023
5	"Tom"	Dan Attias	Wendy Riss	April 16, 2023
6	"The Playbook"	Gwyneth Horder-Payton	Michael Ballin & Thomas Aguilar	April 23, 2023
7	"Gilgamesh"	Batan Silva	Hunt Baldwin	April 30, 2023
8	"Ace in the Hole"	Glenn Ficarra & John Requa	Glenn Ficarra & John Requa	May 7, 2023

== Production ==
Paramount+ first ordered an espionage drama series created by John Requa and Glenn Ficarra and starring Kiefer Sutherland from CBS Studios in May 2021, and the series title Rabbit Hole was announced in February 2022. Rob Yang was the first co-star added to the cast, followed by Charles Dance, Meta Golding, Enid Graham, Jason Butler Harner, and Walt Klink. Wendy Makkena joined the cast as well in September 2022.

The series was inspired by political thrillers such as Three Days of the Condor, The Manchurian Candidate, Marathon Man and The Parallax View, according to Sutherland. Requa and Ficarra describe it as a "paranoid thriller".

The series, set in New York City, began filming in Ontario in May 2022, taking place primarily in Toronto with additional scenes in Hamilton.

On October 26, 2023, Paramount+ cancelled the series after one season.

== Release ==
On January 9, 2023, at Paramount+'s Television Critics Association panel, the series was revealed to be premiering on March 26, 2023.

The series made its linear premiere on Paramount Network in the United States on March 27, 2023.

== Reception ==
The review aggregator website Rotten Tomatoes reported a 76% approval rating with an average rating of 6.9/10, based on 34 critic reviews. The website's critics consensus reads, "Although Rabbit Hole tumbles into one twist too many, Kiefer Sutherland remains compelling in his welcome return to the espionage genre." Metacritic, which uses a weighted average, assigned a score of 66 out of 100 based on 16 critics, indicating "generally favorable reviews".
