= Supporting Our Selves =

2023 Canadian documentary film

- Directed by: Lulu Wei
- Produced by: Jenn Mason
- Edited by: Mary Komech; Tom Lounsbury
- Music by: Arman Bazarian
- Production company: Four Corners Productions
- Release date: May 30, 2023 (Inside Out)
- Running time: 75 minutes
- Country: Canada
- Language: English

Supporting Our Selves is a Canadian documentary film, directed by Lulu Wei and released in 2023. The film centres on the history of the Community One Foundation, a fundraising and community-building organization which has played a key role in the development of the LGBT community in Toronto, Ontario, using it as a lens through which to view the significant changes in the community over the decades, including the tensions between "old guard" activists who were prominent in the 1980s and contemporary young people who are taking the lead today.

The film premiered at the 2023 Inside Out Film and Video Festival, where it was the winner of the juried award for Best Canadian Film.
