= Bishop (TV series) =

Upcoming television series

- Genre: Mystery; Crime drama
- Created by: Tony Saltzman; Little Marvin
- Showrunner: Little Marvin
- Starring: Joel Kinnaman; John Malkovich; Jennifer Jason Leigh; Jordana Brewster; Harry Treadaway; Xavier Samuel
- Composer: Toydrum
- Country of origin: United States
- Original language: English

Production
- Executive producers: Little Marvin; Roy Lee; Tony Saltzman; Michael Uppendahl; Miri Yoon
- Production companies: Amazon MGM Studios; Vertigo Entertainment

Original release
- Network: Amazon Prime Video

Bishop is an upcoming American crime drama television series created by Little Marvin and Tony Saltzman, produced for Amazon Prime Video by Amazon MGM Studios. Little Marvin serves as showrunner and executive produces alongside Roy Lee, Tony Saltzman, Michael Uppendahl, and Miri Yoon.

== Premise ==
The series follows Detective Bishop Graves as he hunts a serial killer who targets San Francisco's elite while gaining support from the poor. As the killer's following develops, Bishop becomes convinced the murders connect to his own father, Lincoln Graves.

== Cast ==
=== Main ===
- Joel Kinnaman as Detective Bishop Graves
- John Malkovich as Lincoln Graves
- Jennifer Jason Leigh as Jillian Graves
- Jordana Brewster as Kat Clairborne
- Harry Treadaway as Wyatt
- Xavier Samuel as Anthony "Ant" Graves

=== Recurring ===
- Jennifer Beals as Maggie Loftin
- Bronson Pinchot as Dougray Dillion
- Ron Lea as Lt. Jack Quinn
- Kaniehtiio Horn as Tasha Graves
- Hunter Dillon as Ren Graves
- Dillon Casey as Inspector Banton
- Brett Donahue as Lee Donnally
- Jorja Cadence as Lara Stone
- Ishan Davé as Inspector Ashish Rai
- Adam J. Harrington as Eric Olsen
- Alex Breaux as Louis Davies
- Geraldo Celasco as Ricardo Cruz
- Ally Ioannides as Mountain Girl
- Steven Yaffee as Cain
- Ulrich Thomsen
- Erik Svedberg-Zelman

=== Guest stars ===
- Rick Hoffman as Martin Stone
- Rob Yang
- John Larroquette

== Production ==
In September 2025, it was reported that Amazon Prime Video had given the greenlight to Bishop, an original thriller drama. The project, which stemmed from Little Marvin's overall deal at Amazon Studios, started gunning for a series order in late Spring 2025 with Joel Kinnaman attached in the lead; negotiations with an "A-list actor" fell through for the role of Lincoln that summer. In February 2026, it was announced that John Malkovich had been cast as Lincoln.

In March 2026, it was confirmed that Jennifer Jason Leigh had been cast as Jillian Graves, the sister to Lincoln and aunt to title character Bishop. That same month, Jordana Brewster, Harry Treadaway, and Xavier Samuel were all cast in series regular roles.

In April 2026, it was announced that Ulrich Thomsen and Erik Svedberg-Zelman had been cast in recurring roles, and that Rob Yang and John Larroquette would guest star. In May 2026, eleven more joined the cast; Rick Hoffman was set to guest star and Jennifer Beals, Bronson Pinchot, Ron Lea, Kaniehtiio Horn, Hunter Dillon, Dillon Casey, Brett Donahue, Jorja Cadence, Ishan Davé, and Adam J. Harrington were set to recur. In August 2026, an additional four actors were cast in recurring roles: Alex Breaux, Ally Ioannides, Gerardo Celasco, and Steven Yaffee.

Production began in May of 2026 and continued through the end of September in Montreal.
