= Fritz Müller (glaciologist) =

Swiss glaciologist (1926–1980)

- Born: 1926; Sünikon, Steinmaur, Canton of Zurich, Switzerland
- Died: 1980 (aged 53–54); Rhône Glacier, Switzerland
- Education: University of Zurich
- Known for: Research on Pingos, gave name to Muller Ice Shelf
- Scientific career
- Fields: Glaciology
- Workplaces: Arctic Institute of North America

Fritz Müller (16 April 1926 – 26 July 1980) was a Swiss glaciologist, who carried out research in Switzerland, Greenland, the Canadian Arctic, Antarctica and the Himalayas.

Fritz Müller was born 1926 in a little town near Zurich and graduated in 1954 in Geographies and Geology from the University of Zurich. After expeditions to Greenland and Mount Everest, he concentrated his work on cold region hydrology. In 1959 he became the scientific leader of a Canadian expedition to Axel Heiberg Island organised by McGill University, where he became Assistance Professor of Glaciology. In 1970 he changed to ETH Zurich, where he became Head of the Institute of Geography and started the investigation of the North Water Polynya in Baffin Bay. Müller also worked on the glacier inventories of the Swiss Alps and the world. He became director of the World Glacier Monitoring Service.

In 1980 Fritz Müller died due to a heart attack during a field excursion for journalists on the Rhône Glacier in Switzerland.

In 2019 Müller's granddaughter Celeste Koon released the short documentary film Love Letters from Everest, inspired by Müller's letters to and from his wife, Barbara Battle, during his Mount Everest expedition.

== Places named after Fritz Müller ==
- Muller Ice Shelf on the Antarctic Peninsula
- Mueller Ice Cap on Axel Heiberg Island in the Queen Elizabeth Islands, Nunavut
