= My Trans Journey =

Canadian documentary web series

My Trans Journey is a Canadian documentary web series, which premiered in 2020 on OutTVGo. The series profiles four people undergoing gender transition under the care of Hamilton, Ontario medical doctor Carys Massarella.

Concurrently with the production of the web series, Massarella also appeared in Translating Beauty, a documentary film which aired as an episode of OutTV's documentary series OUTspoken.

The series received a Canadian Screen Award nomination for Best Web Program or Series, Non-Fiction at the 9th Canadian Screen Awards in 2021.
