= Christine Armstrong =

Canadian film editor

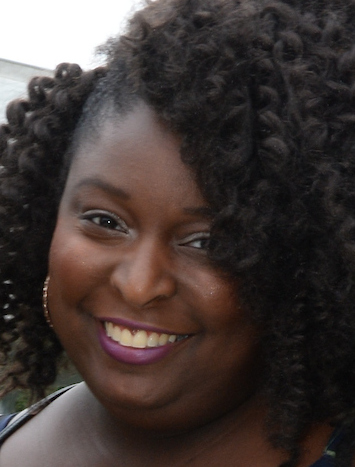
- Occupation: film editor
- Years active: 2000s-present
- Notable work: Sugar Daddy

Christine Armstrong is a Canadian film editor. She is most noted for her work on the 2020 film Sugar Daddy, for which she received a Canadian Screen Award nomination for Best Editing at the 9th Canadian Screen Awards in 2021.

Her other credits have included the films Mary Goes Round, The New Romantic and Hell of a Summer.
