= Donté Colley =

Canadian internet personality and dancer

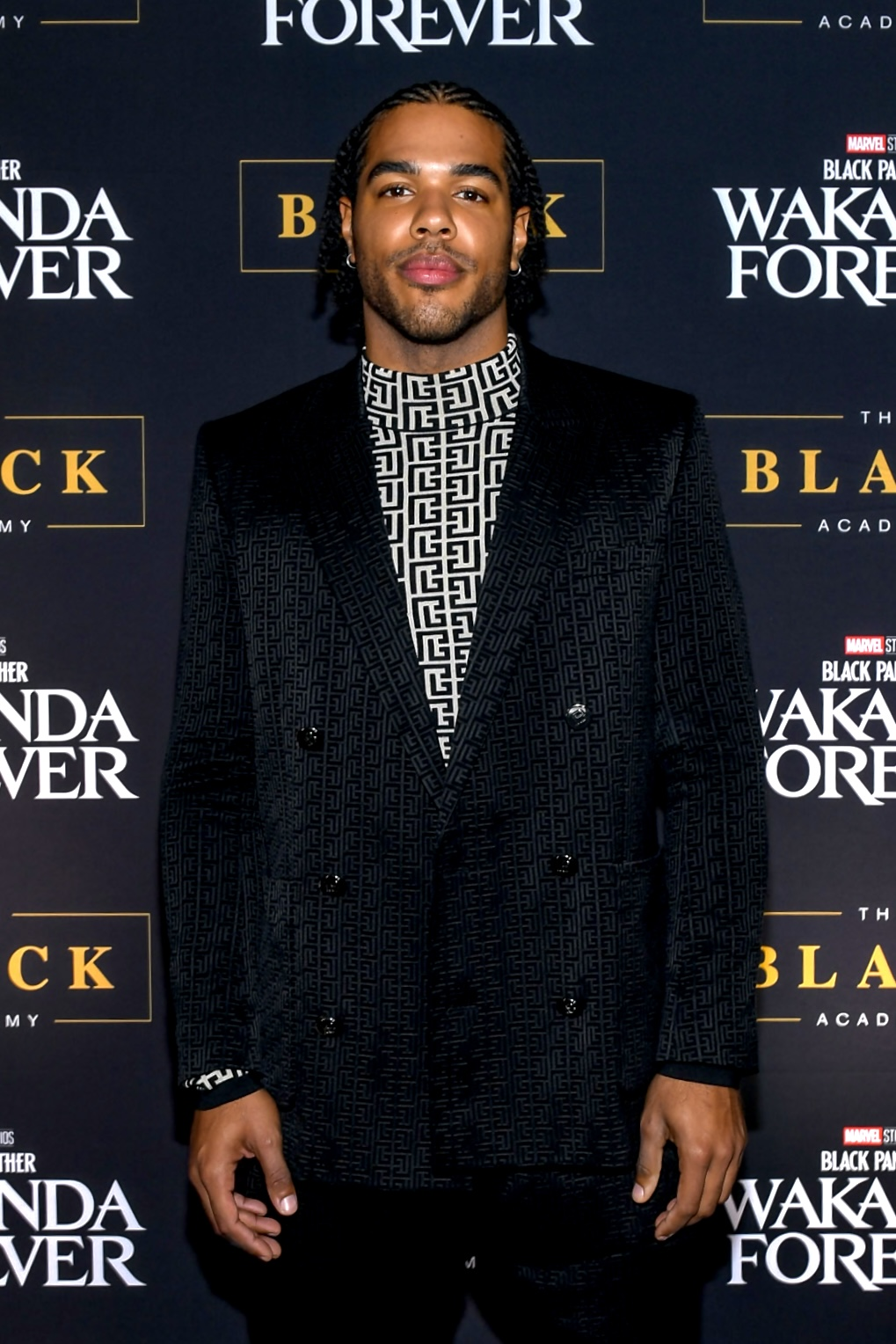
- Colley in 2022
- Born: May 16, 1997 (age 27); Toronto, Canada
- Occupation: Internet personality | Dancer

Donté Colley (born May 16, 1997) is a Canadian internet personality and dancer.

== Early in his life ==
Donté Colley was born in Toronto, Ontario, on May 16, 1997. He grew up in Toronto, and showed an early interest and talent in dance. He attended Wexford Collegiate School for the Arts in Scarborough as a teen. He credits his time there as his opportunity to come into his own artistically in a positive and supportive place.

== Career ==
Colley is a digital communications student who seeks to combine his love of dance with his uplifting messaging to create a safe space on social media through a message of self-love. He has appeared on Good Morning America, Busy Tonight, ETALK Canada, and has been featured on USA Today, Time, Glossier, NPR, Georgetakei.com, Globe & Mail, Flare.com, Allure and Fashion Magazine.

In April 2019, Colley appeared in Ariana Grande's Monopoly music video. The music video shared similar themes with Colley's popular emoji-assisted videos.

In 2021, Colley narrated the livestreamed presentation of children's and animated programming awards for the 9th Canadian Screen Awards.
