= Nigel Downer =

Canadian actor and comedian

Nigel Downer is a Canadian actor and comedian. He is most noted as the co-creator and co-star with Kris Siddiqi of the web series Bit Playas, for which they won the Canadian Screen Award for Best Writing in a Web Program or Series at the 9th Canadian Screen Awards in 2021. He was also a nominee for Best Lead Performance in a Web Program or Series.

Originally from Cambridge, Ontario, he is an alumnus of The Second City's Toronto troupe. He has also had guest roles in Killjoys, Titans, Frankie Drake Mysteries and Baroness von Sketch Show.

== Filmography ==
=== Film ===
| Year | Title | Role | Notes |
|---|---|---|---|
| 2016 | Scars | Kyle | |
| 2016 | First Round Down | Security Guard | |
| 2019 | Georgetown | Hotel Employee | |

=== Television ===
| Year | Title | Role | Notes |
|---|---|---|---|
| 2011 | Microwave Porn | Nigel | 2 episodes |
| 2014 | Odd Squad | Glenn | Episode: "Oscar and the Oscarbots/Picture Day" |
| 2015 | True Dating Stories | Cop #1 | Episode: "Tara" |
| 2016 | Idiot Parade | Karl | Television film |
| 2016 | The Beaverton | Black Man in Suit | Episode #1.5 |
| 2017 | Epic Studios | Cop #1 | Episode: "Cocaine Brings People Together" |
| 2017 | Space Riders: Division Earth | Night Security Guard | Episode: "Space Convention" |
| 2018 | The Sean Ward Show | Black Panther | Episode: "Black Panther Epic Movie Parody" |
| 2018 | The Amazing Gayl Pile | Sand Buyer | Episode: "Sandmen" |
| 2018 | Killjoys | Guy | Episode: "The Warrior Princess Bride" |
| 2018 | Suits | Passerby Four | Episode: "Good Mudding" |
| 2018 | Frankie Drake Mysteries | Bartender | Episode: "Extra Innings" |
| 2018 | Titans | Local Cop #1 | Episode: "Doom Patrol" |
| 2018 | Soul Decision | Server | Episode: "The Bros" |
| 2018–2021 | Baroness von Sketch Show | Tom / Pilot / Uncle Mike | 10 episodes |
| 2019 | Adventures in Casting | Nigel | Episode: "Boomerang" |
| 2019 | Bit Playas | Leon Solomon | 8 episodes |
| 2020 | The Crossword Mysteries | Dr. Cohen | Episode: "Abracadaver" |
| 2021 | Two for the Win | Emcee | Television film |
| 2021 | Air Crash Investigation | NTSB Investigator | Episode: "Cabin Catastrophe" |
| 2021 | The Parker Andersons | Stan | Episode: "Field Trippin'" |
| 2021 | Christmas à La Carte | Theo | Television film |
| 2021–2022 | Ghosts | Cholera Victim Nigel | 3 episodes |
| 2023 | Total Drama Island (2023) | | Writer; episodes: "Severe Eggs and Pains" and "Ice to Beat You" |
| 2024 | My Dead Mom | Bylaw officer | |
