= Fountain Valley massacre =

1972 mass shooting in St. Croix, U.S. Virgin Islands

- Location: 17°44′31″N 64°48′52″W; Fountain Valley Golf Course, St. Croix, U.S. Virgin Islands
- Date: September 6, 1972
- Attack type: Mass shooting, robbery
- Weapon: Firearms
- Deaths: 8
- Injuries: 8
- Perpetrators: Ishmael LaBeet, Beaumont Gereau, Meral Smith, Warren Ballentine, and Raphael Joseph
- Motive: Anti-white racism Black nationalism

The Fountain Valley massacre was a racially motivated mass shooting that occurred in the afternoon of September 6, 1972, at the Fountain Valley Golf Course in St. Croix, U.S. Virgin Islands. The incident left eight resort employees and tourists dead. Another eight were either shot at or wounded.

== Massacre ==
The perpetrators were five Virgin Islanders, Ishmael LaBeet, Beaumont Gereau, Meral Smith, Warren Ballentine, and Raphael Joseph. Authorities initially believed the five had committed the execution-style shootings in the course of a robbery gone bad, but later developments suggested that the killing was planned by at least one of the perpetrators. Joseph and Ballentine testified at trial that they had expected only to commit a robbery but that things got out of hand because LaBeet was adamant that they also make "a political statement"; LaBeet told them "he was angry about foreigners coming in to take our money and leaving us with nothing." According to Joseph, during the robbery LaBeet suddenly began shooting people, while yelling epithets like "I hate you white motherfuckers!" The deceased victims were identified as Richard Griffin, Ruth Griffin, Charles Meisinger, Joan Meisinger, Nicholas Beale, Alliston Lowrey, John Gulliver and Patricia Tarbert.

== Trial and convictions ==
All five defendants were convicted after a jury trial in the District Court of the Virgin Islands, a federal territorial court, on multiple charges of murder, assault, and robbery under Virgin Islands law. Each was sentenced to eight consecutive life terms. Led by civil rights activist lawyers William Kunstler and Chauncey Eskridge, the defense at trial argued in part that the accused were politically motivated victims of systematic race-based civil rights deprivation; all the defendants were Afro-Caribbean, while seven of the eight murder victims were white.

The convictions were affirmed in 1974 by the U.S. Court of Appeals for the Third Circuit, which subsequently also upheld the denial of motions for a new trial.

LaBeet has since denied any involvement in the 1972 shooting.

== Aftermath ==
The racial motivation for the killings and fear of further violence led to a steep decline in tourism to St. Croix, from which the island's tourism industry only recovered decades later.

American musician Sherman Kelly has claimed he was assaulted by some of the same perpetrators three years before the Fountain Valley shooting. While recovering from the assault, Kelly wrote the song "Dancing in the Moonlight" to imagine "an alternate reality, the dream of a peaceful and joyful celebration of life." The song, released in 1970, later became a hit for King Harvest and again for Toploader.

On December 31, 1984, LaBeet (then calling himself Ismail Muslim Ali) hijacked American Airlines Flight 626 while in federal custody on a transfer to a new place of detention, using a handgun stashed in a lavatory. He forced the pilot to land the plane in Havana, Cuba, where LaBeet escaped. He was never recaptured by U.S. authorities. Cuban authorities did prosecute LaBeet for aircraft hijacking. He was sentenced to 10 years in prison, of which he served seven years. With the thawing of Cuban–American relations in 2015, LaBeet was confirmed to be living at large in Cuba. He was the subject of the 2016 documentary film The Skyjacker's Tale.

Joseph was released from prison on December 22, 1994, after being pardoned by the governor of the U.S. Virgin Islands. However, he died of a drug overdose four years later. The other three served 29 years in federal prison before being returned to Virgin Islands custody and then retransferred to private prisons in the mainland U.S. As of 2022, they remained incarcerated at the Citrus County Detention Facility, north of Tampa, Florida.
