= The Boy in the Woods =

2023 Canadian drama film

- Film poster
- Directed by: Rebecca Snow
- Written by: Rebecca Snow
- Based on: The Boy in the Woods by Maxwell Smart
- Produced by: Jonathan Bronfman; Robert Budreau
- Starring: Jett Klyne; Richard Armitage; Christopher Heyerdahl
- Cinematography: Adam Madrzyk
- Edited by: Robert Swartz
- Music by: Julia Kent
- Production companies: Lumanity Productions; JoBro Productions; Undisputed Pictures
- Distributed by: Photon Films
- Release date: September 22, 2023 (Cinéfest)
- Running time: 100 minutes
- Country: Canada
- Language: English

The Boy in the Woods is a 2023 Canadian drama film, written and directed by Rebecca Snow and produced by Jonathan Bronfman and Robert Budreau. Based on the memoir of the same name by Maxwell Smart, the film dramatizes Smart's childhood experience of having to fend for himself in the forests of Poland during World War II.

The film screened in the Industry Selects program at the 2023 Toronto International Film Festival, and had its public premiere in a gala screening at the 2023 Cinéfest Sudbury International Film Festival. It went into commercial release in June 2024.

== Cast ==
- Jett Klyne as Maxwell Smart
- Richard Armitage as Jasko
- Christopher Heyerdahl as Bagan
- Ari Millen as Aleksey
- David Kohlsmith as Yanek
- Masa Lizdek as Kasia
- Berkley Silverman as Rosa
- Joshua Peace as Police Sargeant
- Matt Lishman as Young Partisan
- Katherine Fogler as Faigie
- Tara Nicodemo as Aunt Erna
- Shuna Snow as Regina
- Richard Patrick Tolton II as Hunter
- Morgan Bedard as Danylo

== Production ==
The film entered production in fall 2022 in North Bay, Ontario. Snow had previously directed the television documentary special Cheating Hitler: Surviving the Holocaust, in which Smart was a participant.

== Reception ==
On the review aggregator website Rotten Tomatoes, 100% of 5 critics' reviews are positive.

Rating it 3/5 stars on The Guardian, Leslie Felperin highlighted in his review that "true story of Jewish boy in flight from the Nazis and hiding in the forest is told here with a fair amount of sentiment."

Neerja Choudhuri of The Midgard Times wrote "The Boy in the Woods is a masterfully crafted film where exceptional acting and a well-written screenplay come together to tell a gripping and heartfelt story. The performances elevate the narrative, making it a compelling watch that resonates long after the credits roll."
