= GuideDoc =

Spanish film streaming service

- Company type: private company
- Founded: January 1, 2014; 12 years ago in Barcelona
- Headquarters: Sant Cugat del Vallès (Catalonia, Spain)
- Area served: global
- Founder: Víctor Correal
- Industry: Documentary films
- Products: Streaming media; video on demand
- Services: Documentary distribution
- Website: www.guidedoc.tv

GuideDoc is a global online streaming and distributing service for documentary films, founded by Víctor Correal in Barcelona, Spain.

== Overview ==
GuideDoc started in 2014 with 20 documentaries; many these, such as the 2009 Sins of My Father and Skateistan: To Live and Skate Kabul, Little World (2012) and I Am Breathing (2013) achieved critical acclaim. As of August 2024, the site has over 1850 documentaries, all of which have subtitles in English and in many other languages. The service works as a subscription video and TV on-demand platform for several devices.
