= Nathalie Bibeau =

Canadian documentary filmmaker

Nathalie Bibeau is a Canadian documentary filmmaker from Welland, Ontario, most noted for her 2020 film The Walrus and the Whistleblower.

The film was the winner of the overall Hot Docs Audience Award, and co-winner of the Rogers Audience Award, at the 2020 Hot Docs Canadian International Documentary Festival, and won the award for Best Documentary at the 2020 Forest City Film Festival. It received a nomination for the Donald Brittain Award at the 9th Canadian Screen Awards in 2021, with Bibeau also receiving nominations for Best Editorial Research and Best Direction in a Documentary Program.

She previously received a Canadian Screen Award nomination for Best Editorial Research at the 4th Canadian Screen Awards for her work on the documentary film Sugar Coated, and subsequently was nominated for the Rob Stewart Award at the 10th Canadian Screen Awards for "The Last Walrus", an episode of The Nature of Things.

A graduate of McGill University and the University of Toronto, she has also directed the television documentary series Back in Time for Dinner and The Unsolved Murder of Beverly Lynn Smith, as well as "Why We Dance", an episode of The Nature of Things.
