= Lulu Wei =

Canadian filmmaker

Lulu Wei is a Canadian cinematographer and film director, most noted for their 2020 documentary film There's No Place Like This Place, Anyplace. Wei received two Canadian Screen Award nominations at the 9th Canadian Screen Awards in 2021, for Best Direction in a Documentary Program or Series and Best Writing in a Documentary Program or Series.

They have also directed the short films Left Hook, Spoke and Soap. Their second full-length documentary film Supporting Our Selves premiered at the 2023 Inside Out Film and Video Festival, where it won the juried award for Best Canadian Film.

As a cinematographer Wei worked most notably on Lisa Rideout's 2022 television documentary Sex with Sue, receiving a Canadian Screen Award nomination for Best Photography in a Documentary Program or Factual Series at the 11th Canadian Screen Awards in 2023, and on Antidiva: The Carole Pope Confessions.
