= Highball TV =

Canadian video on demand service

HighballTV, Inc.
- Founded: October 15, 2018; 7 years ago
- Area served: Canada; United States; Mexico; Asia; Africa; South America; Africa; Europe
- Owner: Independent
- Founders: Matt Campagna; Melissa D'Agostino
- Industry: Entertainment
- Website: highballtv.com
- Registration: Optional
- Current status: Active

Highball.TV is a Canadian subscription video on demand service, launched in 2018 by Melissa D'Agostino and Matthew Campagna. The service offers a curated selection of films, concentrating primarily on titles that have screened at various prestigious Canadian and international film festivals but have not otherwise received widespread commercial distribution, partnering with film festivals including Tribeca Film Festival

The platform also features a selection of original Canadian movies and web series, including Mother of All Shows, The Drawer Boy, Tactical Girls, Band Ladies and Less Than Kosher.

The service is currently available on the web, as well as apps for Apple TV and Roku devices. Subscription rates are $7 per month, or $70 annually.

== Original feature films ==
In 2021, HighballTV announced a $12-million slate of original feature films going into production over the following year that would feature women and BIPOC filmmakers in key creative roles.
