= The Remarkable Mr. King =

Canadian animated television series

- Created by: Jeff Astolfo; Andrew Sabiston; Genevieve Cote
- Written by: Shelley Hoffman; Robert Pincombe; Sheila Rogerson; Betty Quan; Jiro C. Okada; Andrea Robin Skinner; Kate Barris
- Voices of: John Novak; Nissae Isen; Leigh Cameron; Simon Lee Phillips; Amos Crawley; Emilie-Claire Barlow; Cory Doran; Carlos Diaz; Mark Robert Edwards; Liane de Lotbinière; Marisa Rocha
- Narrated by: John Novak
- Country of origin: Canada
- Original language: English
- No. of episodes: 13

Production
- Producers: Noemi Mascarenhas; Vanessa Esteves
- Editor: Robert Hornsby
- Production company: Nelvana

Original release
- Network: Treehouse TV
- Release: October 4, 2019

The Remarkable Mr. King is a Canadian animated children's television series produced by Nelvana. It follows a short-sighted, well-meaning little lion who uses "big thinks" and "thoughtful thinks" to solve everyday problems in the Kaleidoscope Woods.

== Production ==
The series was greenlit in September 2018, to be based on the book series of the same name.

== Characters ==
- Mr. King (voiced by Nissae Isen)
- Jim
- Chanelle
- Tex and Bert
- Harriet the Owl
- Freddie
- Rolo
- Skit
- Mr. Chase
- PJ
- Mommy Swan
- Marisa Rocha
- Little Swan
