= Restaurants on the Edge =

Canadian reality television series

Restaurants on the Edge is a Canadian reality television series, which debuted in January 2020 on Cottage Life. The series features chef Dennis Prescott, designer Karin Bohn and restaurateur Nick Liberato travelling around Canada and the world to help struggling restaurants modify their decor and their menu.

The series was also distributed internationally on Netflix.

The series received two Canadian Screen Award nominations at the 9th Canadian Screen Awards in 2021, for Best Lifestyle Program or Series and Best Photography in a Lifestyle or Reality Program or Series (Joe Queenan).
