= Cheating Hitler: Surviving the Holocaust =

Canadian television documentary film

- Genre: Documentary
- Written by: Rebecca Snow
- Directed by: Rebecca Snow
- Starring: Helen Yermus; Maxwell Smart; Rose Lipsyzc
- Country of origin: Canada
- Original language: English

Production
- Producer: Steve Gamester
- Cinematography: Mark Caswell; Alysha Galbreath
- Editor: Graeme Ball
- Running time: 120 minutes
- Production company: Saloon Media

Original release
- Network: History
- Release: November 11, 2019

Cheating Hitler: Surviving the Holocaust is a Canadian television documentary film directed by Rebecca Snow, which premiered in 2019 on History. The film focuses on Helen Yermus, Maxwell Smart and Rose Lipsyzc, three Jewish Canadians who survived the Holocaust as children, as they share their stories and explore unresolved questions from their histories in conjunction with historians, genealogists and forensic experts.

The film aired on History on November 11, 2019, and was rebroadcast on November 16 by the Global Television Network.

== Awards ==
The film received a Banff Rockie Award nomination for Best History and Biography Documentary at the 2020 Banff World Media Festival.

It received six Canadian Screen Award nominations at the 9th Canadian Screen Awards in 2021, for Best History Program or Series, Best Editorial Research (Natasza Niedzielska, Heather Kohlmann, Steve Gamester, Rebecca Snow, Naomi Wise), Best Visual Research (Elizabeth Klinck, Elspeth Domville, Monica Penner), Best Photography in a Documentary Program or Factual Series (Mark Caswell, Alysha Galbreath), Best Direction in a Documentary (Rebecca Snow) and Best Writing in a Documentary (Rebecca Snow). It won the award for Best Visual Research.

== The Boy in the Woods ==
In 2018, Smart published the memoir The Boy in the Woods, centred on his childhood experience of having to fend for himself in the forests of Poland during the war.

In 2022, Snow entered production on the feature film adaptation The Boy in the Woods, which premiered at the 2023 Cinéfest Sudbury International Film Festival.
