= Ghost BFF =

Canadian comedy web series

- Genre: Comedy web series
- Starring: Vanessa Matsui; Kaniehtiio Horn
- No. of seasons: 2

Original release
- Network: WhoHaha
- Release: March 1, 2018 – 2020

Ghost BFF is a Canadian comedy web series, which premiered in 2018 on WhoHaha. Using humor to combat the stigma around mental illness, the series centres on Amy (Vanessa Matsui), a woman whose life is turned upside down when her friend Tara (Kaniehtiio Horn), who committed suicide by drug overdose three years earlier, returns as a ghost and begins to confront her about her own life choices.

The series received two Canadian Screen Award nominations at the 7th Canadian Screen Awards in 2019, for Best Web Series, Fiction and Best Lead Performance in a Digital Program or Series (Matsui). The creators announced in March 2019 that a second season of the series was going into production, with the season debuting on Shaftesbury Films' KindaTV channel on YouTube in 2020.
