= Mark Sakamoto =

Canadian lawyer and writer (born 1977)

- Born: July 4, 1977 (age 49); Medicine Hat, Alberta, Canada
- Education: University of Calgary (B.A.); Dalhousie University (L.L.B.)
- Occupations: Lawyer, writer, entrepreneur, executive
- Writing career
- Notable work: Forgiveness

Mark Sakamoto (born July 4, 1977) is a Canadian lawyer and writer. He is most noted for Forgiveness: A Gift from My Grandparents, a family memoir which was published in 2014.

Originally from Medicine Hat, Alberta, he is the son of a Japanese Canadian father, Stan Sakamoto, and a Scottish-Canadian mother, Diane MacLean. He studied political science at the University of Calgary before moving to Halifax to study law at Dalhousie University. Sakamoto worked on the political staff of former Liberal Party of Canada leader Michael Ignatieff. He is currently the executive vice-president for Think Research, a Canadian software company innovating in health data, and has served on the boards of the Ontario Media Development Corporation and the Trudeau Centre for Peace and Conflict Studies.

During World War II, his paternal grandparents were affected by the Japanese internment in Canada, while his maternal grandfather was captured by the Japanese as a prisoner of war. Their stories of struggle and hardship formed the basis of his book Forgiveness: A Gift from My Grandparents. To write the book, Sakamoto interviewed his grandparents about how they forgave those formative experiences to embrace and connect with each other when their son and daughter fell in love and married. The book was a shortlisted finalist for the Edna Staebler Award in 2015.

Forgiveness was selected for the 2018 edition of Canada Reads, where it was defended by Jeanne Beker. It ended up winning the contest on March 29, 2018. Following its Canada Reads win, producer Don Carmody announced that he had optioned the book for development as a television miniseries.

In 2020, he created and hosted the documentary series Good People for CBC Gem.
