= Kris Siddiqi =

Canadian actor and comedian

Kris Siddiqi is a Canadian actor and comedian. He is most noted as the co-creator and co-star with Nigel Downer of the web series Bit Playas, for which they won the Canadian Screen Award for Best Writing in a Web Program or Series at the 9th Canadian Screen Awards in 2021. He was also a nominee for Best Lead Performance in a Web Program or Series.

He is an alumnus of The Second City's Toronto troupe. In 2020 he participated in Mass Hysterical: A Comedic Cantata, a webcast collaboration between Second City alumni and the Toronto Symphony Orchestra which presented a comedic history of the use of classical and liturgical music in the church.
