= List of Canadian films of 2020 =

This is a list of Canadian films released in 2020:

Title	Director	Cast	Notes	Ref
4 North A	Jordan Canning, Howie Shia			
9/11 Kids	Elizabeth St. Philip			
Akilla's Escape	Charles Officer	Saul Williams, Vic Mensa, Oluniké Adeliyi, Brandon Oakes		
All-In Madonna	Arnold Lim	Melanie Rose Wilson		
Aniksha	Vincent Toi			
The Archivists	Igor Drljaca	Noah Reid, Bahia Watson, Maxwell McCabe-Lokos		
As Spring Comes (Comme la neige au printemps)	Marie-Ève Juste			
An Awkward Balance	David Milchard	Ben Cotton, Christina Sicoli, Stephen Lobo, Sara Canning	Premiered as Fucking Idiots before being retitled	
August 22, This Year	Graham Foy			
Bad Omen	Salar Pashtoonyar	Fereshta Afshar, Faruq Afghan		
Beans	Tracey Deer	Kiawenti:io Tarbell, Paulina Jewel Alexis, Violah Beauvais		
Benjamin, Benny, Ben	Paul Shkordoff	Anwar Haj, Natalie Gallard		
Between Waves	Virginia Abramovich	Fiona Graham, Luke Robinson		
Black Bodies	Kelly Fyffe-Marshall			
Bloodthirsty	Amelia Moses	Lauren Beatty, Greg Bryk, Katharine King So		
Bone Cage	Taylor Olson	Taylor Olson, Amy Groening		
The Book of Distance	Randall Okita			
The Brother (Le frère)	Jérémie Battaglia			
Brother, I Cry	Jessie Anthony	Justin Rain, Lauren Hill, Violet Cameron		
Cake Day	Phillip Thomas	Cameron Crosby, Steven Roberts		
Call Me Human (Je m'appelle humain)	Kim O'Bomsawin			
The Castle (Le Château)	Denys Desjardins			
Cayenne	Simon Gionet	Marianne Fortier, Jean-Sébastien Courchesne		
Chained	Titus Heckel			
Corona	Mostafa Keshvari			
The Corruption of Divine Providence	Jeremy Torrie	Ali Skovbye, Elyse Levesque, David La Haye, Tantoo Cardinal		
Cup of Cheer	Jake Horowitz	Storm Steenson, Alexander Oliver		
The Curse of Willow Song	Karen Lam			
Dave Not Coming Back	Jonah Malak			
Death of a Ladies' Man	Matt Bissonnette	Gabriel Byrne, Jessica Paré		
The Decline (Jusqu'au déclin)	Patrice Laliberté	Guillaume Laurin, Réal Bossé, Marc-André Grondin, Marilyn Castonguay	Thriller; first film from Quebec ever produced and released as a Netflix original film	
The Decline	Sean Patrick Shaul, Kayvon Saremi		Documentary	
Dope Is Death	Mia Donovan			
Eat Wheaties!	Scott Abramovitch	Tony Hale, Elisha Cuthbert		
êmîcêtôcêt: Many Bloodlines	Theola Ross			
Events Transpiring Before, During and After a High School Basketball Game	Ted Stenson	Andrew Phung		
Every Day's Like This	Lev Lewis			
Faking a Murderer	Stuart Stone	Stuart Stone, Adam Rodness, Tony Nappo		
Falling	Viggo Mortensen	Viggo Mortensen, Lance Henriksen, Sverrir Gudnason, Laura Linney	UK-US-Canadian coproduction	
Far from Bashar (Loin de Bachar)	Pascal Sanchez			
Fauna	Nicolás Pereda		Canada/Mexico coproduction	
Finding Sally	Tamara Mariam Dawit			
First We Eat	Suzanne Crocker			
Flashback	Christopher MacBride	Dylan O'Brien, Maika Monroe, Hannah Gross, Amanda Brugel		
Flashwood	Jean-Carl Boucher	Pier-Luc Funk, Antoine Desrochers, Karelle Tremblay		
Flowers of the Field	Andrew Stanley	Alex Crowther, Kristopher Turner, Jesse LaVercombe		
Foam (Écume)	Omar Elhamy			
For the Sake of Vicious	Gabriel Carrer, Reese Eveneshen			
Found Me	David Findlay			
The Fourfold	Alisi Telengut			
The Free Ones (Les Libres)	Nicolas Lévesque			
French Exit	Azazel Jacobs	Michelle Pfeiffer, Lucas Hedges, Tracy Letts	Canada/UK coproduction; adaptation of the novel by Patrick deWitt	
Funny Boy	Deepa Mehta	Arush Nand, Brandon Ingram, Ali Kazmi, Agam Darshi, Seema Biswas	Adaptation of the 1994 novel by Shyam Selvadurai	
Girl	Chad Faust	Bella Thorne, Mickey Rourke, Glen Gould		
Girls Shouldn't Walk Alone at Night (Les filles ne marchent pas seules la nuit)	Katerine Martineau	Amaryllis Tremblay, Nahéma Ricci		
Goddess of the Fireflies (La déesse des mouches à feu)	Anaïs Barbeau-Lavalette	Kelly Depeault, Caroline Néron, Normand D'Amour	Adaptation of the novel by Geneviève Pettersen	
Greetings from Isolation	Various directors		Anthology of short films about the COVID-19 pandemic in Canada	
Happy Place	Helen Shaver	Clark Backo, Sheila McCarthy, Liisa Repo-Martell, Mary Walsh		
Hazy Little Thing	Sam Coyle			
Hibiscus Season (La saison des hibiscus)	Éléonore Goldberg			
How to Be At Home	Andrea Dorfman	Tanya Davis		
I, Barnabé (Moi, Barnabé)	Jean-François Lévesque			
I Might Be Dead by Tomorrow (Tant que j'ai du respir dans le corps)	Steve Patry			
I Propose We Never See Each Other Again After Tonight	Sean Garrity	Hera Nalam, Kristian Jordan		
In Her City	Carl Bessai			
In the Land of the Flabby Schnook (Au pays du cancre mou)	Francis Gélinas			
Inconvenient Indian	Michelle Latimer			
Indian Road Trip	Allan W. Hopkins			
An Introvert's Guide to High School	Sophie Harvey			
Jasmine Road	Warren Sulatycky	Greg Ellwand, Aixa Kay, Melody Mokhtari, Caitlyn Sponheimer		
Jesse Jams	Trevor Anderson	Jesse Jams		
John Ware Reclaimed	Cheryl Foggo			
Judy Versus Capitalism	Mike Hoolboom	Judy Rebick		
Jump, Darling	Philip J. Connell	Thomas Duplessie, Cloris Leachman, Jayne Eastwood, Linda Kash, Tynomi Banks		
The Kid Detective	Evan Morgan	Adam Brody, Sophie Nélisse, Wendy Crewson		
Landgraves	Jean-François Leblanc	François Ruel-Côté, Éric Robidoux, Eve Duranceau		
Laughter (Le Rire)	Martin Laroche	Christine Beaulieu, Alexandre Landry, Micheline Lanctôt, Léane Labrèche-Dor		
Little Orphans	Ruth Lawrence	Emily Bridger, Rhiannon Morgan, Marthe Bernard		
The Magnitude of All Things	Jennifer Abbott			
Marlene	Wendy Hill-Tout	Kristin Booth, Greg Bryk, Julia Sarah Stone		
The Marina (La Marina)	Christophe Levac, Étienne Galloy	Rémi Goulet, Rose-Marie Perreault, Amadou Madani Tall, Anthony Therrien		
Meat the Future	Liz Marshall			
Mercy	Sam Flamont			
Monkey Beach	Loretta Todd	Adam Beach, Nathaniel Arcand, Grace Dove, Glen Gould		
Moon (Lune)	Zoé Pelchat	Joanie Martel		
The Mother Eagle (Le Sang du pélican)	Denis Boivin	Karen Elkin		
My Salinger Year	Philippe Falardeau	Margaret Qualley, Sigourney Weaver, Douglas Booth, Colm Feore		
My Very Own Circus (Mon cirque à moi)	Miryam Bouchard	Patrick Huard, Robin Aubert, Sophie Lorain		
Nadia, Butterfly	Pascal Plante	Katerine Savard		
The New Corporation: The Unfortunately Necessary Sequel	Joel Bakan, Jennifer Abbott		Sequel to the 2003 film The Corporation	
Night of the Kings (La Nuit des rois)	Philippe Lacôte	Isaka Sawadogo, Steve Tientcheu, Rasmané Ouédraogo	Canadian-French-Ivorian coproduction	
No Ordinary Man	Aisling Chin-Yee, Chase Joynt	Billy Tipton		
No Visible Trauma	Marc Serpa Francoeur, Robinder Uppal			
The Oak Room	Cody Callahan	RJ Mitte, Peter Outerbridge, Martin Roach, Nicholas Campbell, Amos Crawley		
Old Buddies (Les Vieux chums)	Claude Gagnon	Patrick Labbé, Paul Doucet		
Our Own (Les Nôtres)	Jeanne Leblanc	Émilie Bierre, Marianne Farley, Judith Baribeau, Paul Doucet		
The Paper Man (Lafortune en papier)	Tanya Lapointe	Claude Lafortune		
Parallel Minds	Benjamin Ross Hayden	Greg Bryk, Tommie-Amber Pirie		
Percy	Clark Johnson	Christopher Walken, Christina Ricci, Zach Braff, Luke Kirby		
The Petrichor	Junga Song	Olga Korsak, Aleksei Serebryakov		
PG: Psycho Goreman	Steven Kostanski			
Pieces of a Woman	Kornél Mundruczó	Vanessa Kirby, Shia LaBeouf, Jimmie Fails, Ellen Burstyn, Molly Parker		
Pink Lake	Emily Gan, Daniel Schachter			
Point and Line to Plane	Sofia Bohdanowicz	Deragh Campbell		
Possessor	Brandon Cronenberg	Andrea Riseborough, Christopher Abbott, Rossif Sutherland, Tuppence Middleton, Sean Bean, Jennifer Jason Leigh		
Prayer for a Lost Mitten (Prière pour une mitaine perdue)	Jean-François Lesage			
Québexit	Joshua Demers	Gail Maurice, Emmanuel Kabango		
Queen of the Andes	Jillian Acreman	Bhreagh MacNeil, Hailey Chown, Maggie Vaughan, Cassidy Ingersoll		
RKLSS	Tank Standing Buffalo			
Reservoir	Kim St-Pierre			
The Rose Family (Les Rose)	Félix Rose			
Rules for Werewolves	Jeremy Schaulin-Rioux			
Rumba Rules, New Genealogies (Rumba Rules, nouvelles généalogies)	Sammy Baloji, David Nadeau-Bernatchez			
Saint-Narcisse	Bruce LaBruce	Félix-Antoine Duval, Tania Kontoyanni, Alexandra Petrachuck, Andreas Apergis		
Scars	Alex Anna			
Shoot to Marry	Steve Markle			
Shooting Star (Comme une comète)	Ariane Louis-Seize	Marguerite Bouchard, Whitney Lafleur, Patrick Hivon		
The Silence (Le Silence)	Renée Blanchar			
The Silencing	Robin Pront	Nikolaj Coster-Waldau, Annabelle Wallis, Hero Fiennes-Tiffin, Zahn McClarnon	Canada/United States co-production	
Sing Me a Lullaby	Tiffany Hsiung			
Sinking Ship	Sasha Leigh Henry			
Slaxx	Elza Kephart	Romane Denis		
Sometimes I Wish I Was on a Desert Island (Y’a des fois où j’aimerais me trouver sur une île déserte)	Eli Jean Tahchi			
Spare Parts	Andrew Thomas Hunt	Julian Richings, Michelle Argyris, Emily Alatalo, Jason Rouse, Kiriana Stanton		
Stage Mother	Thom Fitzgerald	Jacki Weaver, Lucy Liu, Adrian Grenier		
Stateless	Michèle Stephenson			
The Sticky Side of Baklava (La Face cachée du baklava)	Maryanne Zéhil	Jean-Nicolas Verreault, Claudia Ferri, Raïa Haïdar, Geneviève Brouillette, Manuel Tadros, France Castel, Marcel Sabourin		
Still Processing	Sophy Romvari			
Still the Water	Susan Rodgers	Colin Price, Ryan Barrett		
Strong Son	Ian Bawa			
Stump the Guesser	Guy Maddin, Evan Johnson, Galen Johnson			
Succor	Hannah Cheesman	Michaela Kurimsky, Deragh Campbell		
Sugar Daddy	Wendy Morgan	Kelly McCormack, Colm Feore		
Target Number One (a.k.a. Most Wanted)	Daniel Roby	Josh Hartnett, Antoine Olivier Pilon, Stephen McHattie		
There Are No False Undertakings (Il n’y a pas de faux métier)	Olivier Godin	Leslie Mavangui, Florence Blain Mbaye, Ève Duranceau, Schelby Jean-Baptiste, Jean-Marc Dalpé, Fayolle Jean		
There's No Place Like This Place, Anyplace	Lulu Wei			
Tin Can	Seth A. Smith	Anna Hopkins, Simon Mutabazi, Michael Ironside		
Under the Weather	William D. MacGillivray	Stephen Oates, Ruth Lawrence, Des Walsh, Julia Sarah Stone		
Underground (Souterrain)	Sophie Dupuis	Théodore Pellerin		
Underplayed	Stacey Lee	Rezz, Nervo, Tokimonsta, Alison Wonderland	Documentary about women in electronic music	
Vacarme	Neegan Trudel	Rosalie Pépin, Sophie Desmarais		
Vagrant	Caleb Ryan	Luke Oparah		
The Vinland Club (Le Club Vinland)	Benoît Pilon	Sébastien Ricard, Rémy Girard, François Papineau		
Violation	Madeleine Sims-Fewer, Dusty Mancinelli	Madeleine Sims-Fewer, Jesse LaVercombe		
Wander	April Mullen	Aaron Eckhart, Katheryn Winnick, Heather Graham, Tommy Lee Jones		
The Walrus and the Whistleblower	Nathalie Bibeau	Philip Demers		
Wandering: A Rohingya Story (Errance sans retour)	Mélanie Carrier, Olivier Higgins			
The Winter Lake	Phil Sheerin			
Without Havana (Sin la Habana)	Kaveh Nabatian	Yonah Acosta, Evelyn O’Farrill, Aki Yaghoubi		
You Will Remember Me (Tu te souviendras de moi)	Éric Tessier	Rémy Girard, France Castel, Julie Le Breton		

== See also ==
- 2020 in Canada
- 2020 in Canadian television
