= 2020 Vancouver International Film Festival =

- Opening film: Monkey Beach by Loretta Todd
- Location: Vancouver, British Columbia, Canada
- Festival date: September 24–October 7, 2020

The 2020 Vancouver International Film Festival, the 39th event in the history of the Vancouver International Film Festival, was held from September 24 to October 7, 2020. On September 3, organizers announced a lineup of 180 films; due to the COVID-19 pandemic in British Columbia and the associated social distancing restrictions remaining in place at movie theatres and other public venues, the festival took place primarily on the online VIFF Connect platform.

Most films were geoblocked so that they were available for streaming only to viewers in British Columbia, although some of the festival's other programming, including its VIFF Talks series, was made available to viewers across Canada and internationally.

== Awards ==
Audience-voted awards were announced at the end of the festival on October 7; however, some of the juried award winners were announced during the festival, beginning with the announcement of the British Columbia film categories on September 27, as a technique to help publicize and promote the winning films.

Award	Film	Filmmaker
Most Popular Canadian Narrative	Beans	Tracey Deer
Most Popular Canadian Documentary	Inconvenient Indian	Michelle Latimer
Most Popular International Narrative	My Wonderful Wanda (Wanda, mein Wunder)	Bettina Oberli
Most Popular International Documentary	The Reason I Jump	Jerry Rothwell
Best Canadian Film	Beans	Tracey Deer
Best Canadian Documentary	Call Me Human (Je m'appelle humain)	Kim O'Bomsawin
Best Canadian Short Film	Bad Omen	Salar Pashtoonyar
Best Canadian Short Film, Honorable Mention	Moon (Lune)	Zoé Pelchat
Emerging Canadian Director	Violation	Madeleine Sims-Fewer, Dusty Mancinelli
Best BC Film	The Curse of Willow Song	Karen Lam
Best BC Short Film	Cake Day	Phillip Thomas
Sea to Sky Award	Nuxalk Radio	Banchi Hanuse
BC Emerging Filmmaker	Brother, I Cry	Jessie Anthony
VIFF Impact Award	The Reason I Jump	Jerry Rothwell
Rob Stewart Eco Warrior Award	The Hidden Life of Trees (Das geheime Leben der Bäume)	Peter Wohlleben (subject), Jörg Adolph (filmmaker)
Immersed (Virtual Reality Program), Best Cinematic Live Action	Kowloon Forest	Alexey Marfin
Immersed, Best Documentary	By the Waters of Babylon	Kristen Lauth Shaeffer, Andrew Halasz
Immersed, Best Animation	The Book of Distance	Randall Okita
Immersed, Honorable Mention in Animation	In the Land of the Flabby Schnook (Au pays du cancre mou)	Francis Gélinas
Immersed, Audience Award	Ecosphere: Raja Ampat	Joseph Purdam

== Films ==
=== Contemporary World Cinema ===
- Another Round (Druk) — Thomas Vinterberg
- Bad Tales — Damiano and Fabio D'Innocenzo
- Black Bear — Lawrence Michael Levine
- Falling — Viggo Mortensen
- Father — Srdan Golubović
- Hammamet — Gianni Amelio
- Here We Are — Nir Bergman
- In the Name of the Land (Au nom de la terre) — Édouard Bergeon
- Kala azar — Janis Rafa
- Last and First Men — Jóhann Jóhannsson
- Merkel: Anatomy of a Crisis (Die Getriebenen) - Stephan Wagner
- A Metamorphosis of the Birds (A metamorfose dos pássaros) — Catarina Vasconcelos
- Mogul Mowgli — Bassam Tariq
- My Donkey, My Lover & I (Antoinette dans les Cévennes) — Caroline Vignal
- My Mexican Bretzel — Nuria Giménez
- My Wonderful Wanda (Wanda, mein Wunder) — Bettina Oberli
- On the Quiet — Zoltán Nagy
- The Pencil (Prostoi Karandash) — Natalya Nazarova
- The Restoration (La Restauración) — Alonso Llosa
- Sarita (Dimmi chi sono) — Sergio Basso
- Servants (Sluzobnici) — Ivan Ostrochovsky
- The Shepherdess and the Seven Songs (Laila aur satt geet) — Pushpendra Singh
- Siberia — Abel Ferrara
- Summer of 85 (Été 85) — François Ozon
- Tales of the Lockdown (Relatos confinados) — Fernando Colomo, Álvaro Fernández Armero, David Marqués, Miguel Bardem, Juan Diego Botto
- There Is No Evil (Sheytan vojud nadarad) — Mohammad Rasoulof
- This Is My Desire (Eyimofe) — Arie & Chuko Esiri
- Uncle (Onkel) — Frelle Petersen
- Undine — Christian Petzold
- Yalda, a Night for Forgiveness — Massoud Bakhshi
- Yellow Sunglasses (Gafas amarillas) — Iván Mora Manzano

=== True North ===
- Akilla's Escape — Charles Officer
- An Awkward Balance — David Milchard
- Beans — Tracey Deer
- Brother, I Cry — Jessie Anthony
- Call Me Human (Je m'appelle humain) — Kim O'Bomsawin
- Chained — Titus Heckel
- Events Transpiring Before, During and After a High School Basketball Game — Ted Stenson
- First We Eat — Suzanne Crocker
- Flowers of the Field — Andrew Stanley
- Happy Place — Helen Shaver
- Inconvenient Indian — Michelle Latimer
- John Ware Reclaimed — Cheryl Foggo
- The Magnitude of All Things — Jennifer Abbott
- Monkey Beach — Loretta Todd
- My Salinger Year — Philippe Falardeau
- Nadia, Butterfly — Pascal Plante
- No Ordinary Man — Aisling Chin-Yee, Chase Joynt
- The New Corporation: The Unfortunately Necessary Sequel — Joel Bakan, Jennifer Abbott
- No Visible Trauma — Marc Serpa Francoeur, Robinder Uppal
- Pink Lake — Emily Gan, Daniel Schachter
- Prayer for a Lost Mitten (Prière pour une mitaine perdue) — Jean-François Lesage
- Saint-Narcisse — Bruce LaBruce

=== Gateway ===
- A Life Turned Upside Down: My Dad's an Alcoholic — Kenji Katagiri
- Beauty Water — Cho Kyung-hun
- Dancing Mary — Sabu
- Memories to Choke on, Drinks to Wash Them Down — Leung Ming-kai, Kate Reilly
- Mickey on the Road — Lu Mian Mian
- Moving On — Yoon Dan-bi
- My Prince Edward — Norris Wong
- Shanghai Swings — Yang Mingteng
- The Town of Headcounts — Shinji Araki
- Twilight's Kiss (Suk Suk) — Ray Yeung

=== Altered States ===
- The Curse of Willow Song — Karen Lam
- Jumbo — Zoé Wittock
- Lapsis — Noah Hutton
- Sanzaru — Xia Magnus
- Special Actors — Shin'ichirô Ueda
- Violation — Madeleine Sims-Fewer, Dusty Mancinelli

=== Impact ===
- Caught in the Net — Barbora Chalupová, Vít Klusák
- Citizen Penn — Don Hardy
- Cured — Bennett Singer, Patrick Sammon
- The Forum — Marcus Vetter
- The Hidden Life of Trees (Das geheime Leben der Bäume) — Jörg Adolph
- I Am Not a Hero — Pablo Crutzen, Robin Smit, Stijn Deconinck
- The Reason I Jump — Jerry Rothwell
- Women in Blue — Deirdre Fishel

=== Insights ===
- Anerca, Breath of Life — Johannes Lehmuskallio, Markku Lehmuskallio
- Into the Storm — Adam Brown
- Journey to Utopia — Erlend E. Mo
- My Voice Will Be With You — Bruno Tracq
- Once Upon a Time in Venezuela — Anabel Rodríguez Ríos
- The Race to Alaska — Zach Carver
- Super Frenchie — Chase Ogden
- Time — Garrett Bradley
- Wolf Walk — Jean-Michel Bertrand

=== International Shorts ===
- À la carte — Jay Do
- The Book of Ruth — Becca Roth
- Destructors — Otis Tree
- Empty Places — Geoffroy de Crécy
- Flawless — Nathan Franck
- Flush — Diego Freitas
- Home — Alex von Hofmann
- Homeless Home — Alberto Vázquez
- The Hunter — Sam McConnell
- I Want to Make a Film About Women — Karen Pearlman
- Illusione — Lorenzo Quagliozzi
- Imelda and Luis — Leonel Chee
- In This Land We're Briefly Ghosts — Chen-Wen Lo
- Jane — Kathryn Prescott
- Little Chief — Erica Tremblay
- Malakout — Farnoosh Abedi
- Not a Word — Élodie Wallace
- Now, Daphne — Johann G. Louis
- Of Memories and Madness — Maria Isabel de la Ossa
- The Parrot Lady — Michalis Kalopaidis
- The Roses of Damascus — Gabriel Gonzalez Guirola, Yasmina Touzani
- She — Matt Greenhalgh
- Sheep, Wolf and a Cup of Tea — Marion Lacourt
- Sin Cielo — Jianna Maarten
- To: Gerard — Taylor Meacham
- To the Dusty Sea — Héloïse Ferlay
- The Twins — Cru Bannon, Douglas Ho, Yuriz Joe
- Union County — Adam Meeks
- Wade — Upamanyu Bhattacharyya, Kalp Sanghvi
- White Eye — Tomer Shushan
- Widowers — Julian Tuna
- The Winter — Xin Li
- A Woman — Tahmina Rafaella

=== M/A/D ===
- Frida Kahlo — Ali Ray
- In the Tracks of - Special Edition — Pascale Cuenot
- Jimmy Carter: Rock & Roll President — Mary Wharton
- Maguy Marin: Time to Act — David Mambouch
- Marcel Duchamp: The Art of the Possible — Matthew Taylor
- My Rembrandt — Oeke Hoogendijk
- Paris Calligrammes — Ulrike Ottinger

=== Modes ===
- All, or Nothing at All — Persijn Broersen, Margit Lukács
- Becoming Alluvium — Thảo Nguyên Phan
- Bittersweet — Sohrab Hura
- A Demonstration — Sasha Litvintseva, Beny Wagner
- Digital Funeral: Beta Version — Sorayos Prapapan
- The End of Suffering (a proposal) — Jacqueline Lentzou
- (e)scape goat — Sid Iandovka
- In Times of Deception — Michael Heindl
- A Month of Single Frames — Lynne Sachs, Barbara Hammer
- Playback — Agustina Comedi

=== Short Forum ===
- Aniksha — Vincent Toi
- The Archivists — Igor Drljaca
- As Spring Comes (Comme la neige au printemps) — Marie-Ève Juste
- August 22, This Year — Graham Foy
- Bad Omen — Salar Pashtoonyar
- Benny's Best Birthday — Benjamin Schuetze
- Black Forest Sanatorium — Diana Thorneycroft
- Boredom — Mashie Alam
- Breaking up for the Modern Girl — Sydney Nicole Herauf
- Cake Day — Phillip Thomas
- Canucks Riot II — Lewis Bennett
- Cosmic — Meredith Hama-Brown
- Deeper I Go — Michael P. Vidler
- êmîcêtôcêt: Many Bloodlines — Theola Ross
- Even in the Silence — Jonathan Elliott
- Every Day's Like This — Lev Lewis
- The Fake Calendar — Meky Ottawa
- First Person Shooter — Cole Kush
- Foam (Écume) — Omar Elhamy
- The Fourfold — Alisi Telengut
- Girls Shouldn't Walk Alone at Night (Les filles ne marchent pas seules la nuit) — Katerine Martineau
- The Great Malaise (Le Mal du siècle) — Catherine Lepage
- Into Water — Cole Forrest
- Laura — Kaayla Whachell
- Moon (Lune) — Zoé Pelchat
- A New Leash on Life — Daniel Jeffery
- Nuxalk Radio — Banchi Hanuse
- Parlour Palm — Rebeccah Love
- Rag Doll — Leon Lee
- Spring Tide — Jean Parsons
- Strong Son — Ian Bawa
- Succor — Hannah Cheesman
- Sunken Cave and a Migrating Bird — Qiuli Wu
- This Bright Flash — Rylan Friday
- Toward You — Meysam Motazedi
- The Train Station — Lyana Patrick
- The Trip — Mikizi Migona Papatie
- tu — Suzanne Friesen
- Vaivén — Nisha Platzer
- Zoo — Will Niava
