= 2020 Festival du nouveau cinéma =

Film festival in Montreal, Canada

- Opening film: Underground (Souterrain) by Sophie Dupuis
- Closing film: My Salinger Year by Philippe Falardeau
- Location: Montreal, Quebec, Canada
- Founded: 1971
- Festival date: October 7-31, 2021
- Website: nouveaucinema.ca/en

Festival du nouveau cinéma
- 2021 2019

The 2020 edition of the Festival du nouveau cinéma, the 49th edition in the event's history, took place from October 7 to 31, 2020 in Montreal, Quebec, Canada. Due to the COVID-19 pandemic in Quebec, it was staged almost entirely online, with the exception of a few outdoor screenings at Ciné-parc FNC x YUL, a temporary drive-in theatre in the employee parking lot of Montréal–Trudeau International Airport.

The festival had planned to include some in-person screenings, but was forced to cancel these when the government of Quebec imposed a 28-day lockdown on September 29, just days before the festival was set to begin. As the drive-in and online components were already planned, the festival was able to quickly pivot its strategy, although the tight timeframe meant that a few films that had been scheduled for in-person screenings had to be pulled from the program rather than being added to the online platform.

The festival was slated to open with a free public screening of Underground (Souterrain) by Sophie Dupuis at FNC x YUL, but this event had to be cancelled due to severe weather. It closed with the film My Salinger Year by Philippe Falardeau on October 16; some, but not all, films in the program then remained available on the online platform until October 31.

== Awards ==
Award winners were announced on October 17.

The international competition jury comprised Pascale Bussières, Louise Lecavalier and Félix Dufour-Laperrière, while the national competition jury consisted of Evelyne de la Chenelière, Timothée Donay and Ewa Puszczynska.

Award	Film	Filmmaker
National Competition, Grand Prize	Judy Versus Capitalism	Mike Hoolboom
National Competition, Prix de la diffusion Québécor	Without Havana (Sin la Habana)	Kaveh Nabatian
International Competition, Grand Prize	Atlantis (Атлантида)	Valentyn Vasyanovych
International Competition, Prix de l’innovation Daniel Langlois	Ecstasy (Êxtase)	Moara Passoni
International Competition, Best Acting Performance	This Is Not a Burial, It's a Resurrection	Mary Twala Mhlongo
FIPRESCI International Critics Prize	Last and First Men	Jóhann Jóhannsson
New Alchemists Prize	Khamsin	Grégoire Orio, Grégoire Couvert
P'tits Loups	À la mode	Jean Lecointre
FNC Explore Panorama Prize	O	Qiu Yang
FNC Explore Horizon Prize	The Book of Distance	Randall Okita
National Competition, Short Film	Foam (Écume)	Omar Elhamy
National Competition, Short Film Honorable Mention	Benjamin, Benny, Ben	Paul Shkordoff
National Competition, Short Film Public Prize	Shooting Star (Comme une comète)	Ariane Louis-Seize
International Competition, Short Film	Filipiñana	Rafael Manuel
International Competition, Short Film Honorable Mention	Red Aninsri, or, Tiptoeing on The Still Trembling Berlin Wall	Ratchapoom Boonbunchachoke
New Alchemists, Animated Short Film	Serial Parallels	Max Hattler
New Alchemists, National Dada Prize	Barcelona Burning (Barcelona de foc)	Theodore Ushev
New Alchemists, International Dada Prize	How to Disappear	Total Refusal
RPCÉ Grand Prize	Danica's Mom	Kennedy Kao
Pitch Premières Œuvres	Ghosts of the Sea (Les Enfants du large)	Virginia Tangvald

== Official selections ==
=== International Competition ===
English title	Original title	Director(s)	Production country
Abandonment	Desterro	Maria Clara Escobar	Brazil, Portugal, Argentina
Atlantis	Атлантида	Valentyn Vasyanovych	Ukraine
Bad Roads	Pohani dorohy	Natalya Vorozhbyt	Ukraine
The Cloud in Her Room	Ta fang jian li de yun	Zheng Lu Xinyuan	China, Hong Kong
Ecstasy	Êxtase	Moara Passoni	Brazil
Kill It and Leave This Town	Zabij to i wyjedź z tego miasta	Mariusz Wilczyński	Poland
Servants	Služobníci	Ivan Ostrochovský	Slovakia, Romania, Czech Republic, Ireland
The Shepherdess and the Seven Songs	Laila aur satt geet	Pushpendra Singh	India
This Is Not a Burial, It's a Resurrection		Lemohang Jeremiah Mosese	Lesotho, South Africa, Italy
Topside		Celine Held, Logan George	United States

=== National Competition ===
English title	Original title	Director(s)	Production country
Judy Versus Capitalism		Mike Hoolboom	Canada
There Are No False Undertakings	Il n'y a pas de faux métier	Olivier Godin	Canada
Violation		Madeleine Sims-Fewer, Dusty Mancinelli	Canada
Without Havana	Sin la Habana	Kaveh Nabatian	Canada

=== International Panorama ===
English title	Original title	Director(s)	Production country
Apples	Mila	Christos Nikou	Greece
Cocoon	Kokon	Leonie Krippendorf	Germany
Drowsy City	Thanh Pho Ngu Gat	Dung Luong Dinh	Vietnam
If It Were Love	Si c'était de l'amour	Patric Chiha	France
Moving On	Nam-Mae-Wui Yeo-Reum-Bam	Yoon Dan-bi	South Korea
Mum, Mum, Mum	Mamá, mamá, mamá	Sol Berruezo Pichon-Rivière	Argentina
Oasis	Oaza	Ivan Ikić	Serbia
Sisters with Transistors		Lisa Rovner	United States
A Thief's Daughter	La hija de un ladrón	Belén Funes	Spain
Wisdom Tooth	Ri Guang Zhi Xia	Liang Ming	China
A Yellow Animal	Um animal amarelo	Felipe Bragança	Brazil, Portugal, Mozambique

=== The New Alchemists (Les Nouveaux alchimistes) ===
English title	Original title	Director(s)	Production country
DAU. Natasha		Ilya Khrzhanovsky, Jekaterina Oertel	Russia, Germany, Ukraine, United Kingdom
Khamsin		Grégoire Orio, Grégoire Couvert	France, Lebanon
Last and First Men		Jóhann Jóhannsson	Iceland
Maggie's Farm		James Benning	United States
Night Has Come		Peter Van Goethem	Belgium
Red Moon Tide	Lúa vermella	Lois Patiño	Spain
To the Moon		Tadhg O'Sullivan	Ireland

=== The Essentials (Les Incontournables) ===
English title	Original title	Director(s)	Production country
Conference	Konferentsiya	Ivan Tverdovskiy	Russia, Estonia, United Kingdom, Italy
There Is No Evil	Sheytân vojūd nadârad	Mohammad Rasoulof	Germany, Czech Republic, Iran
Undine		Christian Petzold	Germany, France
Uppercase Print	Tipografic majuscul	Radu Jude	Romania
Wim Wenders, Desperado		Andreas Frege, Eric Friedler	Germany

=== Temps 0 ===
English title	Original title	Director(s)	Production country
The Book of Vision		Carlo S. Hintermann	Italy, United Kingdom, Belgium
Caught in the Net	V síti	Barbora Chalupová, Vít Klusák	Czech Republic
Fishlove	Poissonsexe	Olivier Babinet	France, Belgium
The Kidnapping of Michel Houellebecq	L'enlèvement de Michel Houellebecq	Guillaume Nicloux	France
Out of the Blue		Dennis Hopper	United States
Red Post on Escher Street	エッシャー通りの赤いポスト	Sion Sono	Japan
Shell and Joint		Isamu Hirabayashi	Japan
Siberia		Abel Ferrara	Italy, Germany, Mexico
Simply Black	Tout simplement noir	Jean-Pascal Zadi, John Wax	France
Thalasso		Guillaume Nicloux	France
The Tremor	Nilanadukkam	Balaji Vembu Chelli	India

=== Special Presentations ===
English title	Original title	Director(s)	Production country
Octobre		Pierre Falardeau	Canada
Orders	Les Ordres	Michel Brault	Canada
Saint-Narcisse		Bruce La Bruce	Canada

=== Cult Films at Ciné-Parc ===
English title	Original title	Director(s)	Production country
Mad Max		George Miller	Australia
Mad Max 2: The Road Warrior		George Miller	Australia
Mad Max Beyond Thunderdome		George Miller, George Ogilvie	Australia
Mad Max: Fury Road		George Miller	Australia, United States
Pink Floyd: The Wall		Alan Parker	United Kingdom
The Shining		Stanley Kubrick	United States
Total Recall		Paul Verhoeven	United States

=== International Competition for Short Films ===
English title	Original title	Director(s)	Production country
Battlefield		Jannis Lenz	Austria, Germany
Digital Funeral: Beta Version		Sorayos Prapapan	Thailand
L'Effort commercial		Sarah Arnold	France
The End of Suffering (A Proposal)	To telos tou ponou (Mia protasi)	Jacqueline Lentzou	Greece
Erpe-Mere		Noemi Osselaer	Belgium
The Eyes of Summer	Gimhanaye Netra	Rajee Samarasinghe	Sri Lanka, United States
Filipiñana		Rafael Manuel	Philippines, United Kingdom
Fishbowl		Ngabo Emmanuel	Rwanda
Heaven Reaches Down to Earth		Tebogo Malebogo	South Africa
Lake on Fire	Sjö i brand	Jennifer Rainsford	Sweden
Maalbeek		Ismaël Joffroy Chandoutis	France
Menarca		Lillah Halla	Brazil
Motorway65		Evi Kalogiropoulou	Greece
Our Kingdom	O Nosso Reino	Luis Costa	Portugal
Places	Miegamasis Rajonas	Vytautas Katkus	Lithuania
Rain Hums a Lullaby to Pain	A chuva acalanta a dor	Leonardo Mouramateus	Portugal, Brazil
Red Aninsri, or, Tiptoeing on The Still Trembling Berlin Wall		Ratchapoom Boonbunchachoke	Thailand
The Return of Tragedy		Bertrand Mandico	France
Song of Clouds		Ankit Poudel	Nepal
Sudden Light		Sophie Littman	United Kingdom
Sun Dog		Dorian Jespers	Belgium, Russia
Talk to Her		Iwa	South Korea
This Means More		Nicolas Gourault	United Kingdom, France, Portugal
Towards Evening	Axşama doğru	Teymur Hajiyev	Azerbaijan
The Unseen River	Giòng Sông Không Nhìn Thấy	Phạm Ngọc Lân	Vietnam, Laos
Which Is Witch?		Marie Losier	France
White Goldfish		Jan Roosens, Raf Roosens	Belgium

=== National Competition for Short Films ===
English title	Original title	Director(s)	Province
Acting Out		Jean-Sébastien Beaudoin Gagnon	Quebec
Aniksha		Vincent Toi	Quebec
As Spring Comes	Comme la neige au printemps	Marie-Ève Juste	Quebec
August 22, This Year		Graham Foy	Ontario
Benjamin, Benny, Ben		Paul Shkordoff	Ontario
Every Day's Like This		Lev Lewis	Ontario
Father Neptune		Erik Horn	British Columbia
Fear in Motion		Jean-Christophe Yacono	Quebec
Foam	Écumne	Omar Elhamy	Quebec
Happy as Can Be	Chez les heureux de ce monde	Jean-François Sauvé	Quebec
Here at Home	À la maison	Renaud Ouimet	Quebec
Inuit Languages in the 21st Century		Ulivia Uviluk	Quebec
Moon	Lune	Zoé Pelchat	Quebec
Nadia		Malorie Urbanovitch	Quebec
Parlour Palm		Rebeccah Love	Ontario
Point and Line to Plane		Sofia Bohdanowicz	Ontario
The Pond, at Night	L'Étang, la nuit	Olivia Boudreau	Quebec
Shooting Star	Comme une comète	Ariane Louis-Seize	Quebec
Spring Tide		Jean Parsons	British Columbia
Storm Child	L'Enfant-tempête	Ines Guennaoui	Quebec
Sunken Cave and a Migrating Bird		Qiuli Wu	British Columbia
Vaivén		Nisha Platzer	British Columbia
Zen Basketball		Mike Hoolboom	Ontario

=== The New Alchemists, Short Films ===
English title	Original title	Director(s)	Production country
Aletsch Negative		Laurence Bonvin	Switzerland
Alltöting		Andreas Hykade	Germany, Canada, Portugal
Barcelona Burning	Barcelona de Foc	Theodore Ushev	Canada, Spain
Blue Lips	Lèvres bleues	Philippe Hamelin	Canada
Coldshot		Evan Collis	Canada
Disappearing Silence	Le Silence a disparu	Sarah Seené	Canada
Dissolution Prologue (Extended Version)		Siegfried Fruhauf	Austria
Drink Some Darkness		Trevor Mowchun	Canada
Earthbound	Terrestres	Normand Rajotte	Canada
Forwards, Backwards		Mitchell Stafiej	Canada
Glimmer		Dan Browne	Canada
Grand-maman piano		Guillaume Vallée	Canada
Here and There	Aquí y allá	Melisa Liebenthal	Argentina, France
How to Disappear		Total Refusal	Austria
Imperial Irrigation		Lukas Marxt	Austria, Germany
Inflorescence		Nicolaas Schmidt	Germany
Instructions for Robots		Mike Hoolboom	Canada
The long wail of a passing train slips into the heart of the ghosts and everything explodes in silence	Le long cri du train qui passe se glisse au coeur des spectres et tout explose en silence	Anne-Marie Bouchard	Canada
Marcel Broodthaers in Conversation with Hideaki Anno and Akhenaten	Marcel Broodthaers en conversation avec Hideaki Anno et Akhenaton	Julie Tremble	Canada
May 35		Tina Takemoto	United States
Meine Liebe		Clara Jost	Portugal
Mood Hall		Takumi Kawai, Hiroki Okamura	Japan
Mr. Carreaux		Marie-Hélène Turcotte	Canada
Notes, Imprints (On Love): Part 1		Alexandra Cuesta	United States, Ecuador
One		Anouk De Clercq	Belgium, Norway
The Peepul Tree		Sonja Feldmeier	Switzerland
Push This Button If You Begin to Panic		Gabriel Böhmer	United Kingdom
Recoding Entropia		François Vautier	France
The Roses of Damascus	Les Roses de Damas	Gabriel Gonzalez Guirola, Yasmina Touzani	France
The Selkie		Monade Li	France
Serial Parallels		Max Hattler	Hong Kong, Germany
Sfumato		Robert Seidel	Germany, United States
Something to Remember	Något att minnas	Niki Lindroth von Bahr	Sweden
There Must Be Some Kind of Way Out of Here		Rainer Kohlberger	Austria, Germany
Thorax		Siegfried Fruhauf	Austria
Untitled Sequence of Gaps		Vika Kirchenbauer	Germany
The Walk	La Marche	Yoakim Bélanger	Canada
When We Are Nothing Left		Milja Viita	Canada, Finland

=== RPCÉ Canadian Student Short Film Competition ===
English title	Original title	Director(s)	Province
33' Lot		Sarah Genge	British Columbia
L'Abat		Olivier Côté	Quebec
Adelante		Romy Boutin St-Pierre	Quebec
Cave In		Mathilde Chamussy, Gabrielle Chicoine, Marie-Ève Drolet	Quebec
The Cold	Le Froid	Natalia Duguay	Quebec
Danica's Mom		Kennedy Kao	Ontario
Eve and Fatima	Ève et Fatima	Julie Redon	Quebec
Familiar		Cécilia Alain	Quebec
Hope	Kwizera	Romeo Axcel Uwemera	Quebec
I Must Be Going		Jack Pocaluyko	Ontario
Kijâtai		Kijâtai-Alexandra Veillette-Cheezo	Quebec
Léphémer		Anne Delarue	Quebec
The Mediator	Le Médiateur	Philippe Besner	Quebec
Mitochondrial		Laura Kamugisha	Quebec
Monstre d'eau douce		Maxym Bronsard	Quebec
Promise Me		Alison Duke	Ontario
Sleeping with the Fishes		Jordan Beck Crouse	Nova Scotia
Take Me	Prends-moi	Chloé Sirois, Samuel Boucher, Ali Dupont-Proulx	Quebec

=== RPCÉ Partner: National University of Colombia ===
English title	Original title	Director(s)	Province
Manacillo		Nicolás Garcés	Colombia
No lo encuentro		Mariana Jiménez	Colombia
Umbral		Juan Francisco Rodriguez	Colombia

=== P'tits loups ===
Short film program of animation for children.

English title	Original title	Director(s)	Production country
À la mode		Jean Lecointre	France
And Yet We're Not Super Heroes	On est pas prêts d'être des super héros	Lia Bertels	Belgium
Archie		Ainslie Henderson	United Kingdom
Athleticus 2: Luge		Nicolas Deveaux	France
Athleticus 2: Une patinoire pour deux		Nicolas Deveaux	France
Autumn Winds, Spring Winds and Two Doves	Le Vent d'automne, le vent de printemps et les deux coulombes	Sadegh Javadi Nikjeh	Iran, France
Away	Au large	Mathilde Pepinster	Belgium
Boriya		Sung Ah Min	France, South Korea
Dorothy the Rambler	Dorothy la vagabonde	Emmanuelle Gorgiard	France
The Horn Quartet: Up to the Mountain	Le Quatuor des cornes: Là-haut sur la montagne	Benjamin Botella, Arnaud Demuynck	France, Belgium
The Kindergarten Show	Le Spectacle de maternelle	Loïc Bruyère	France
The Last Day of Autumn	Le Dernier jour de l'automne	Marjolaine Perreten	Switzerland, France, Belgium
Leaf	Listek	Aliona Baranova	Czech Republic
A Lynx in the Town	Un Lynx dans la ville	Nina Bisiarina	France, Switzerland
Mishou		Milen Vitanov	Germany, Bulgaria
Non-Non Gets Shrunk	Non-Non rétrécit	Wassim Boutaleb Joutei	France
Northern Lights	Au pays de l'aurore boréale	Caroline Attia	France, Switzerland
Promenade sentimentale		Émilie Tronche	France
Setting Suns	Soleils couchants	Aurélie Montèix	France
Sweet Night	Nuit chérie	Lia Bertels	Belgium
The Tiger and His Master	Le Tigre et son maître	Fabrice Luang-Vija	France, Belgium
To the Dusty Sea	À la mer poussière	Héloïse Ferlay	France
Umbrellas	Parapluies	José Prats, Alvaro Roblès	France, Spain
Under the Ice	Sous la glace	Milan Baulard, Ismail Berrahma, Flore Dupont, Laurie Estampes, Quentin Nory, Hugo Potin	France

=== FNC Explore ===
Virtual reality projects.

English title	Original title	Director(s)	Production country
1st Step: From Earth to the Moon		Jörg Courtial, Maria Courtial	Germany
Agence		Pietro Gagliano	Canada
Black Bag		Qing Shao	China
The Book of Distance		Randall Okita	Canada
Daughters of Chibok		Joel Benson	Nigeria
Dreamin' Zone		Fabienne Giezendanner	France, Switzerland, Germany, South Korea
The Hangman at Home 3D		Uri Kranot, Michelle Kranot	Denmark, France, Canada
Hominidae		Brian Andrews	United States
In the Land of the Flabby Schnook	Au pays du cancre mou	Francis Gélinas	Canada
The Line		Ricardo Laganaro	Brazil
Meet Mortaza		Josephine Derobe	France, Belgium
Minimum Mass		Raqi Syed, Areito Echevarria	New Zealand, France, United States
Mirror: The Signal		Pierre Zandrowicz	France, Belgium
Missing Pictures: Bird of Prey		Clément Deneux	France, United Kingdom, Taiwan
O		Qiu Yang	Taiwan
An Ode to Moss		SU	Taiwan
Passenger		Sobel Knowles, Van Sowerwine	Australia
The Passengers	Les Passagers: elle et lui	Ziad Touma	Canada, France
Recoding Entropia		François Vautier	France

=== Films planned but not screened ===
Due to the last-minute cancellation of in-person screenings, some films previously announced by the festival that had been planned for in-person rather than online screenings were not included in the festival.

English title	Original title	Director(s)	Production country
Another Round	Druk	Thomas Vinterberg	Denmark, Sweden, Netherlands
La Contemplation du mystère		Albéric Aurtenèche	Canada
Days	Rìzi	Tsai Ming-liang	Taiwan
Irreversible Straight Cut	Irréversible — Inversion Intégrale	Gaspar Noé	France
Lux Æterna		Gaspar Noé	France
Mandibles	Mandibules	Quentin Dupieux	France
Music Hole		Gaëtan Lekens, David Mutzenmacher	Belgium
No Trace	Nulle trace	Simon Lavoie	Canada
The Truffle Hunters		Michael Dweck, Gregory Kershaw	United States, Greece, Italy
The Woman Who Ran	Domangchin yeoja	Hong Sang-soo	South Korea
