= New Politics Initiative =

- Founded: 2001
- Dissolved: 2004
- Ideology: social democracy; democratic socialism

The New Politics Initiative (NPI) was a faction of Canada's New Democratic Party. It was generally viewed to be further left than Alexa McDonough's leadership, but not as far left as the Socialist Caucus.

The NPI believed that the NDP was moving too close to the right, and was dangerously close to becoming another Liberal Party. It believed in uniting Canada's left to combat that. The NPI viewed Canada's left as being more than just the labour unions, but rather as appealing to a staunch left wing who believe in anti-globalization, feminism, gay rights, and environmentalism. The NPI attributed the poor showing of the NDP in recent years to having alienated its left-wing base by moving towards the centre, and wished to bring these activists into the NDP by adopting their views.

The NPI was founded in June 2001, and was soon joined by British Columbian Members of Parliament Libby Davies and Svend Robinson. Other prominent members included Judy Rebick and Jim Stanford. The NPI originally called for the NDP to disband and form another, more left wing, party under a different name with the participation of social movements. It was said that this would have followed the path set by the NDP when it was created in 1961 by its predecessor party, the Cooperative Commonwealth Federation, and labour unions, but the NPI did not propose a formal merger, but a disbanding.

The NPI never articulated a specific plan for how social movements could be integrated into the NDP. At the NDP convention held in Winnipeg in November 2001, opponents of the initiative used that lack of detail to defeat the proposal. The NPI's resolution won the support of almost 40 per cent of convention delegates.

When Jack Layton won the NDP leadership in January 2003, it was taken as a victory by the NPI, with whom Layton had sympathized, but never joined. Key NPI leaders such as Robinson, Davies and Rebick supported Layton's campaign for leader. With Layton's election the NPI became less vocal and formally dissolved in early 2004, with a concluding public meeting being held on February 22.
