= Barcelona Burning =

2020 film by Theodore Ushev

- Catalan: Barcelona de Foc
- Directed by: Theodore Ushev
- Produced by: Theodore Ushev
- Animation by: Theodore Ushev
- Production company: Centre de Cultura Contemporània de Barcelona
- Release date: February 27, 2020 (Animac)
- Running time: 5 minutes
- Countries: Canada; Spain

Barcelona Burning (Catalan: Barcelona de Foc) is a 2020 animated short film, directed by Theodore Ushev and released in 2020. A reflection on the 2019 Catalan protests, the film consists of hot wax painting superimposed on the Barcelona telephone directory. The film was commissioned by the Centre de Cultura Contemporània de Barcelona after the riots broke out just a few days before Ushev's scheduled talk at the centre about his creative process.

The film premiered in February 2020 at the Animac festival in Lleida, Spain. It was later screened in the New Alchemists program at the 2020 Festival du nouveau cinéma, where it was the winner of the National Dada Prize.

It was a Prix Iris nominee for Best Animated Short Film at the 23rd Quebec Cinema Awards in 2021.
