= In Broad Daylight (2022 film) =

2022 film by Emmanuel Tardif

- French: Au grand jour
- Directed by: Emmanuel Tardif
- Written by: Emmanuel Tardif
- Produced by: Emmanuel Tardif; Léa Roy
- Starring: Marianne Fortier; Karine Gonthier-Hyndman; David Savard; Amaryllis Tremblay
- Cinematography: François Herquel
- Edited by: Antoine Foley-Dupont
- Music by: Julien Racine
- Production company: Les Rapailleurs
- Distributed by: Les Films du 3 mars
- Release date: July 6, 2022 (Karlovy Vary)
- Running time: 94 minutes
- Country: Canada
- Language: French

In Broad Daylight (French: Au grand jour) is a 2022 Canadian drama film, directed by Emmanuel Tardif. The film centres on a reclusive wealthy family who have spent months living in virtual isolation in the family mansion to prevent their community from finding out that daughter Hélène (Amaryllis Tremblay) has gotten pregnant from a one-night stand, only to have their fragile equilibrium challenged when Hélène leaves the house soon after the baby's birth to look for the father.

The cast also includes Karine Gonthier-Hyndman and David Savard as Hélène's parents, Elijah Patrice as her brother, Marianne Fortier as a relative mystified by her family's lack of contact, and Jean-Simon Leduc as Antonin, the baby's father.

The film entered production in 2020 in Saint-Paul-d'Abbotsford, Quebec.

It premiered in the Proxima competition for emerging filmmakers at the 56th Karlovy Vary International Film Festival in July 2022. It had its Canadian premiere at the 2022 Cinéfest Sudbury International Film Festival in September, and its Quebec premiere at the Cinemania film festival in November. At Cinemania, the film received an honorable mention from the Jury Prize jury.

The commercial release was slated for April 2023, but was cancelled in January after Tardif was arrested for murdering his mother. He was later found to be not criminally responsible due to being mentally ill.
