= Calgary Black Chambers =

Canadian society of Black professionals

- Formation: 2020
- Founder: Jon Cornish
- Headquarters: Calgary
- Co-Founders: Jon Cornish, Chi Iliya-Ndule, Kene Ilochonwu, Chucks Okafor, Michael Lee Hing, Akwasi Antwi, Clarence Wynter and Charles Buchanan
- Website: calgaryblackchambers.ca

The Calgary Black Chambers is a Canadian society of Black professionals based in Calgary, Alberta. It promotes leadership capacity, advocates for social justice, and runs the Calgary Black Achievement Awards.

== Organization ==
The Calgary Black Chambers was started by Jon Cornish, who "rounded up a few dozen Black professionals to join him in his efforts to nurture Calgary's youth, knowing the struggles young Black Canadians can still face today." Jon's efforts were based on an idea from his wife, inspired by the late Manmeet Bhullar and his work in Calgary's Sikh youth community.

Alongside founding board members Chi Iliya-Ndule, Kene Ilochonwu, Michael Lee Hing, Chucks Okafor, Akwasi Antwi, Clarence Wynter, and Charles Buchanan, the Calgary Black Chambers came to be in 2020. As of February 2022, the organization had 200 members.

== Activities ==
Calgary Black Chambers provides annual educational scholarships ranging from $1,000 to $7,000. It also provides mentorship to secondary and post-secondary students and runs the Calgary Black Achievement Awards.

In 2022, Calgary Black Chambers was named the recipient of the Friends of Education Award (Zone 5) by the Alberta School Boards Association. The same year, the organization called for an inquiry into the killing of Latjor Tuel.

In 2025, the Calgary Foundation reported that the Calgary Black Chambers Scholarship Fund awarded 20 scholarships totaling $85,000 to Black youth in Calgary. The same year, Calgary Black Chambers was featured on Global News Morning Calgary during Black History Month, where representatives discussed mentorship initiatives and the Calgary Black Achievement Awards.
