= My Wonderful Wanda =

- Directed by: Bettina Oberli
- Written by: Cooky Ziesche; Bettina Oberli
- Produced by: Lukas Hobi; Reto Schaerli
- Starring: Agnieszka Grochowska; Marthe Keller; André Jung
- Cinematography: Judith Kaufmann
- Edited by: Kaya Inan
- Music by: Lukas Vogel
- Release date: April 2020 (TFF)
- Running time: 110 minutes
- Country: Switzerland
- Language: German

My Wonderful Wanda (German: Wanda, mein Wunder) is a 2020 Swiss comedy-drama film directed by Bettina Oberli and starring Agnieszka Grochowska, André Jung, Birgit Minichmayr, Jacob Matschenz, and Marthe Keller. The film follows Wanda, a Polish caregiver working for a wealthy Swiss family whose role in the household changes after she unexpectedly becomes pregnant. It later won Best Screenplay at the 2021 Festival International du Film de Mons and the 2021 Schnitt Prize for Best Editing.

== Synopsis ==
Wanda, a 35-year-old Polish caregiver, works in the lakeside villa of Josef and his wife Elsa, providing around-the-clock care while also sending money to her family in Poland. As she becomes increasingly drawn into the private life of the household, her position within the family changes after she unexpectedly becomes pregnant.

== Cast ==
The cast includes:

- Agnieszka Grochowska as Wanda
- André Jung as Josef
- Birgit Minichmayr as Sophie
- Jacob Matschenz as Gregi
- Marthe Keller as Elsa

== Production ==
Filming began in February 2019 at a villa in Stäfa on Lake Zurich, which director Bettina Oberli selected as a location for the film. The film had a budget of 3.5 million Swiss francs.

== Reception ==
=== Awards and nominations ===
The film won the audience award for Most Popular International Narrative Film at the 2020 Vancouver International Film Festival. It also won Best Screenplay at the 2021 Festival International du Film de Mons and the 2021 Schnitt Prize for Best Editing, awarded to Kaya Inan. It was also nominated for Best Fiction Film at the 2021 Swiss Film Awards.

=== Critical response ===
The film received a 67% rating on Rotten Tomatoes based on 21 reviews and a score of 54 out of 100 on Metacritic based on 8 critic reviews, indicating mixed or average reviews.

Sheri Linden of The Hollywood Reporter called the film "engagingly played" but felt that it "runs out of satirical steam", while Alissa Simon of Variety praised its performances and surprising twists. Ann Hornaday of The Washington Post wrote that, despite the "sometimes rickety scaffolding" of the story, the cast delivers "honest, grounded performances".

== Festival screenings ==
My Wonderful Wanda premiered in April 2020. It later screened at festivals including the Tribeca Film Festival, the Zurich Film Festival, and the Vancouver International Film Festival in 2020, and at the Solothurn Film Festival and the Shanghai International Film Festival in 2021.
