= Querencia (web series) =

2021 Canadian web series

Querencia is a Canadian web series, which premiered in June 2021 on APTN Lumi. The first original web series ever created for the service, the series centres on the romance between Daka (Kaitlyn Yott) and Abe (Mary Galloway), two young First Nations women living in Vancouver, British Columbia.

The series was written and directed by Mary Galloway, and is produced by Jessie Anthony.

It premiered June 1, 2021 on Lumi. The first two episodes were also screened as part of the 2021 Inside Out Film and Video Festival, followed by a panel discussion featuring Galloway, Anthony and Yott.

The series received two Canadian Screen Award nominations, for the Audience Choice Award and Best Web Program or Series, Fiction, at the 10th Canadian Screen Awards in 2022.
