= Judy Rebick =

Canadian journalist, activist, and feminist

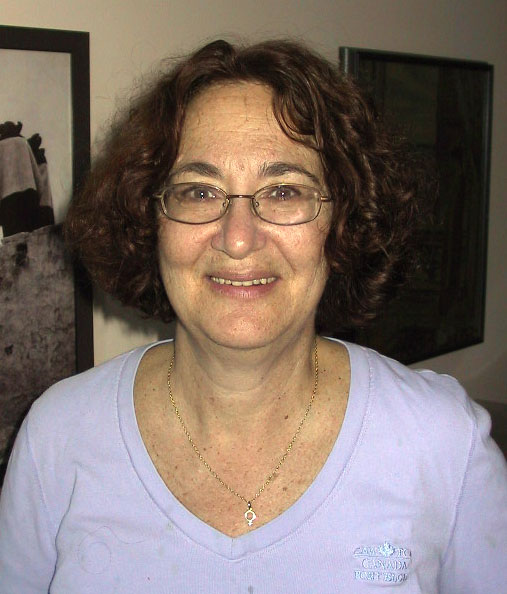
- Born: August 15, 1945 (age 81); Reno, Nevada, U.S.
- Occupations: Writer, journalist, activist
- Writing career
- Period: 1970s–present
- Notable works: rabble.ca, Ten Thousand Roses, Occupy This, Heroes in My Head

Judy Rebick (born August 15, 1945) is a Canadian writer, journalist, political activist, and feminist.

== Early life ==
Born in Reno, Nevada, Rebick and her family moved to Toronto when she was 9. She became a socialist activist in the 1970s, joining the Revolutionary Marxist Group. She was a member of its successor, the Revolutionary Workers League, and wrote articles for the RWL's newspaper, Socialist Voice, until she left the organization in the early 1980s.

== Career ==
=== 1980s ===
Rebick first gained prominence in her role as spokesperson for the Ontario Coalition for Abortion Clinics, a pro-choice group, in the 1980s.

In 1983, when a man attacked Henry Morgentaler with garden shears outside of his Toronto abortion clinic, Rebick blocked the attack, and Morgentaler escaped unharmed. Augusto Dantas was charged with assault and with possession of a weapon dangerous to the public good.

She became active in the mid-1980s with an internal group within the Ontario New Democratic Party called the "Campaign for an Activist Party". Though the CAP generated a significant degree of grassroot support, it was opposed by the party establishment, including party leader Bob Rae, and failed. Rebick lost her bid to become party president, losing to Gillian Sandeman, 818 votes to 361. In the 1987 provincial election, she was the NDP's candidate in the suburban Toronto riding of Oriole, where she placed third with 16.7% of the vote, losing to the incumbent, Liberal cabinet minister Elinor Caplan.

Rebick also worked for The Canadian Hearing Society during the 1970s and 1980s as special projects director.

=== 1990s ===
Rebick became a nationally known figure as president of the National Action Committee on the Status of Women from 1990 to 1993. She was the co-host of a prime time debate show called Face Off on CBC Newsworld from 1994–1998 and then a women's discussion show Straight From the Hip, until 2000. She was a regular commentator on CBC TV's Sunday Report and CBC Radio. She was during that time also a columnist with Elm Street, the London Free Press, and on CBC Online.

=== 2000s ===
With Jim Stanford, Svend Robinson and Libby Davies, she helped lead the New Politics Initiative, a movement that worked both inside and outside the New Democratic Party to refocus it as an activist party. The NPI's platform was rejected at the 2001 NDP convention in Winnipeg. She initiated the wind down of the NPI in 2003, claiming that many of its ideals had been embraced by new party leader Jack Layton.

In 2005, she published Ten Thousand Roses: The Making of a Feminist Revolution, which covers feminists movements in Canada from the 1960s through the 1990s. She also published Transforming Power: From the Personal to the Political (2009). From 2002 to 2011 she served three consecutive terms as the Canadian Auto Workers–Sam Gindin Chair in Social Justice and Democracy at Ryerson University (now Toronto Metropolitan University) in Toronto, Ontario.

Rebick, who is Jewish, took part in protests against the State of Israel's military actions in the 2009 Gaza conflict.

=== 2010–present ===
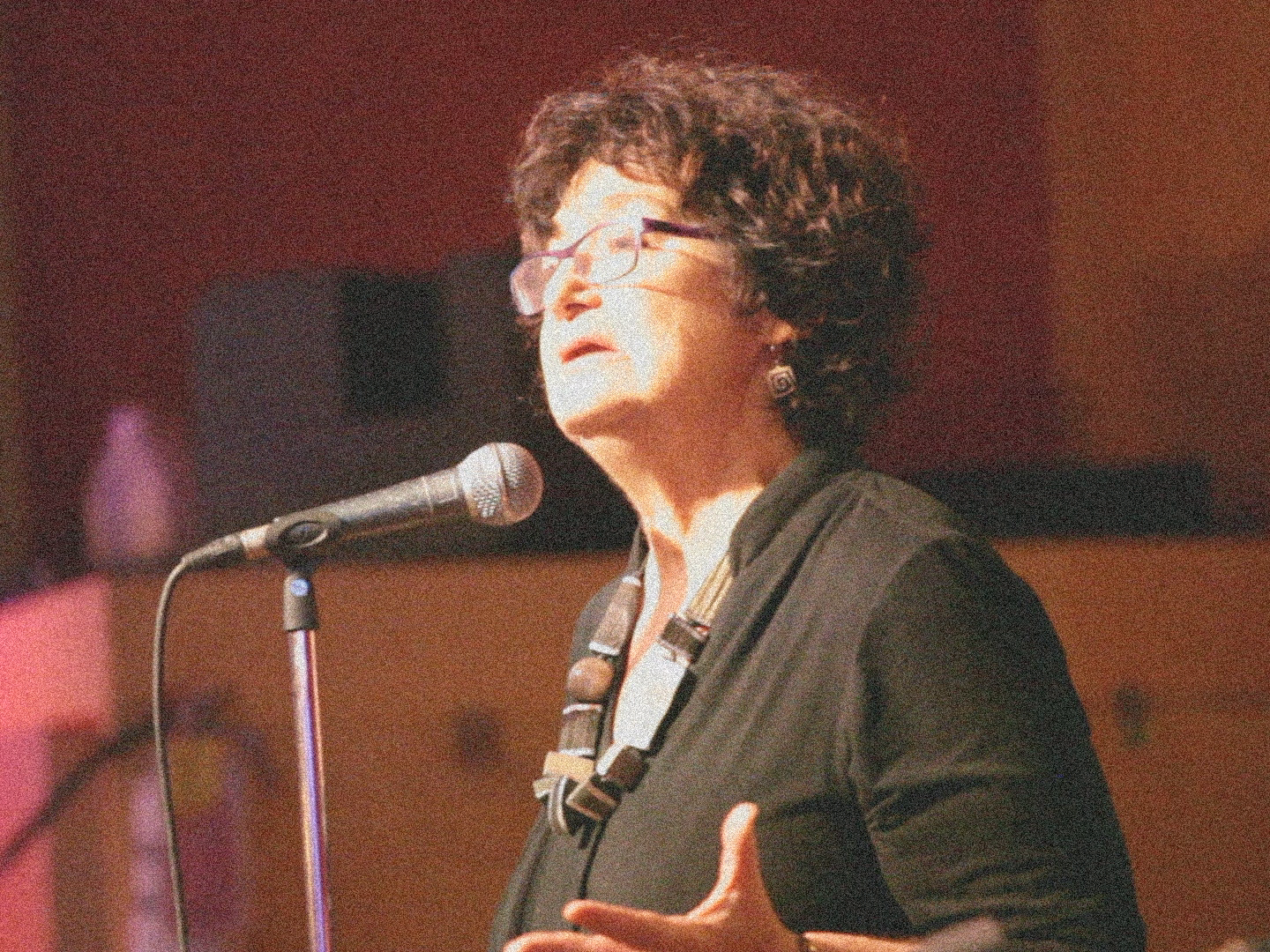
Rebick in Judy Versus Capitalism (2020)

After the conclusion of the G20 summit in Toronto in June 2010, Rebick suggested that police did not adequately address the problem of Black Bloc protestors who caused property damage, stating at the time, "What they could have done is arrest the Black Bloc at the beginning before they had a chance to be part of the bigger crowd, and that's what they didn't do."

Rebick began visiting Occupy camps starting with Zuccotti Park in New York on October 16, 2011, after the movement had exploded in growth overnight and camps had been established in cities throughout the US and Canada. She began promoting the Occupy movement, and in March 2012 her book Occupy This was released by Penguin Canada.

Her memoir, Heroes in My Head, was released in 2018. The book formed part of the basis for Mike Hoolboom's documentary film Judy Versus Capitalism, which was released in 2020.

In March 2022, she was amongst 151 international feminists signing Feminist Resistance Against War: A Manifesto, in solidarity with the Russian Feminist Anti-War Resistance. (Note: This manifesto was criticized by both Ukrainian feminists and members of the Feminist Anti-War Resistance themselves.)

In 2026, Rebick endorsed Avi Lewis in that year's federal NDP leadership race.
