= Amaryllis Tremblay =

Canadian actress

Amaryllis Tremblay is a Canadian actress from Quebec.

== Career ==
Tremblay appeared in a number of short films, and had a small role in the television series District 31, before being cast in her first significant film role as Nicolas' girlfriend in Genesis (Genèse). She has since appeared in the films Young Juliette (Jeune Juliette), Fabulous (Fabuleuses), Girls Shouldn't Walk Alone at Night (Les filles ne marchent pas seules la nuit) and Drunken Birds (Les oiseaux ivres), and the television series L'Écrivain public and Six degrés.

She won a Gémeaux Award for Best Actress in a Youth Series in 2021 for Six degrés, and the award for Breakout Performance in a Short Film at the 2021 Canadian Film Festival for Girls Shouldn't Walk Alone at Night. In 2022, she starred in Emmanuel Tardif’s In Broad Daylight (Au grand jour).

== Personal life ==
Tremblay grew up in a small town along the Canada–United States border. She spent most of her teen years in Victoriaville before moving to Montreal.

== Filmography ==
=== Film ===
Year	Work	Character	Notes
2017	Good Girl	Flore	Short
2017	Waiting for You	Jess	Short
2018	Genesis (Genèse)	Girlfriend of Nicholas	
2019	She Who Wears the Rain (Celle qui porte la pluie)	Agnès	Short
2019	Fabulous (Fr: Fabuleuses)	Féministe	
2019	Young Juliette (Jeune Juliette)	Julie	
2020	Girls Shouldn't Walk Alone at Night (Les filles ne marchent pas seules la nuit)	Chantal	Short
2021	Drunken Birds (Les oiseaux ivres)	Lou	
2022	In Broad Daylight (Au grand jour)	Hélène	
2025	Elsewhere at Night (Ailleurs la nuit)	Jeanne	

=== Television ===
Year	Work	Character	Notes
2018	District 31	Charlie Frenette	Episode: "Une beuverie qui tourne mal"
2019	Nomades	Julianne	TV miniseries, Episode: "Le grand départ"
2020	L'écrivain public	Laurence	4 episodes
2021	Six degrés	Florence Parah	13 episodes
2023	Stat	Sasha	
