= Pink Lake (Canada) =

Meromictic lake in Quebec, Canada

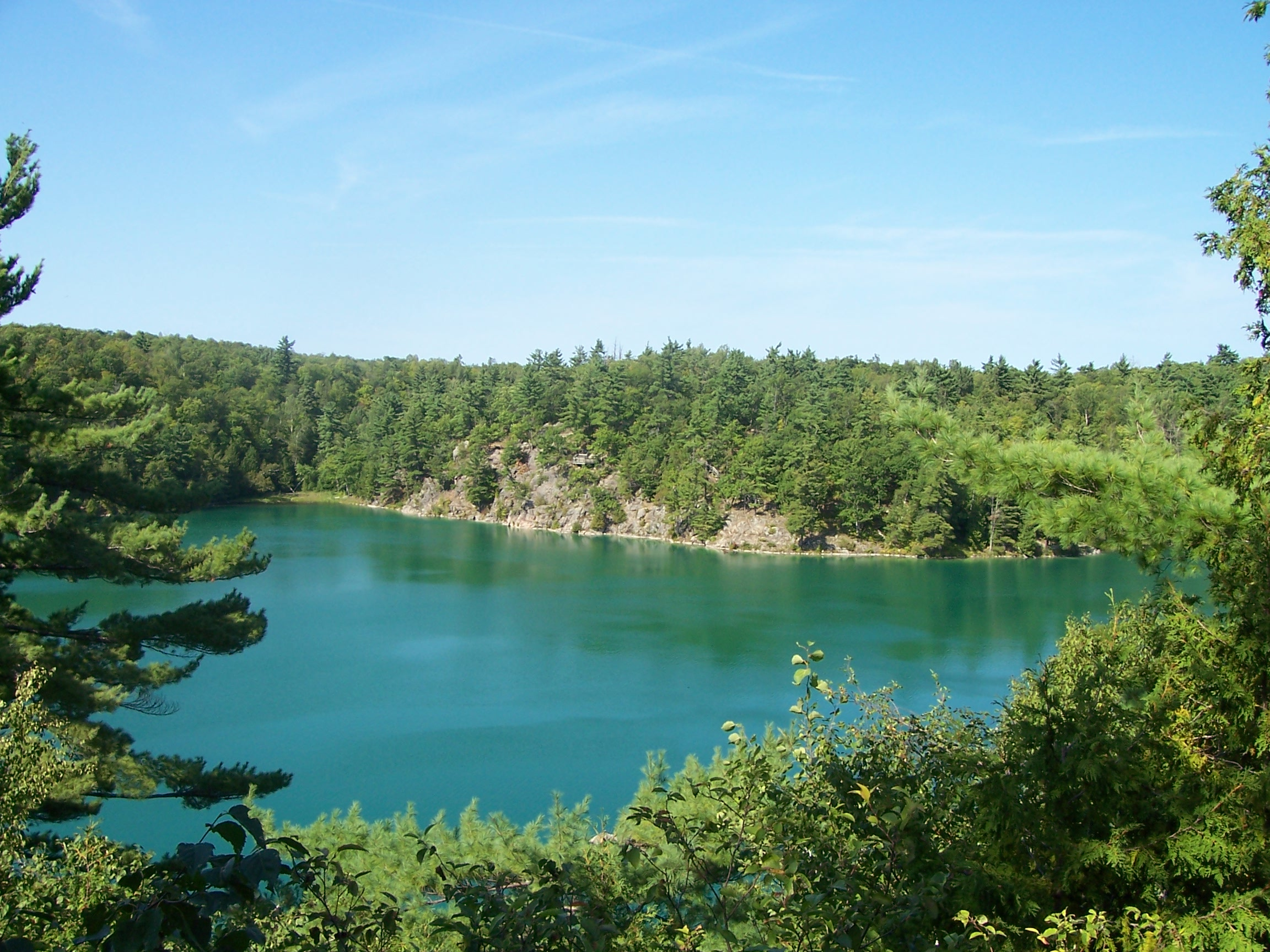

- Location within Quebec

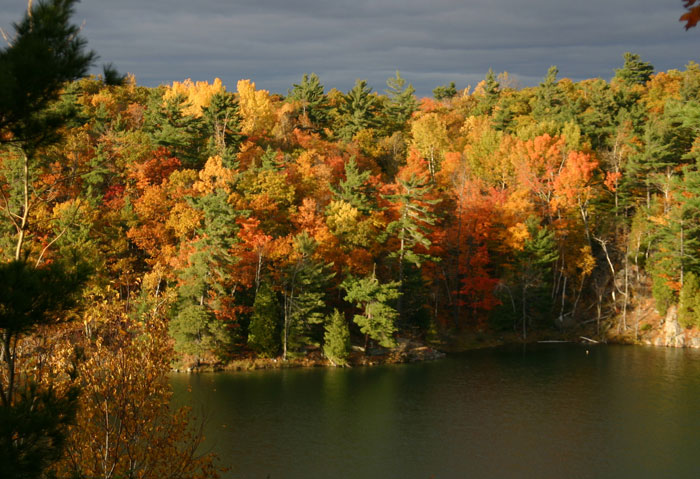
- Location: Gatineau Park, Gatineau, Quebec
- Coordinates: 45°28′05″N 75°48′25″W
- Type: meromictic
- Basin countries: Canada

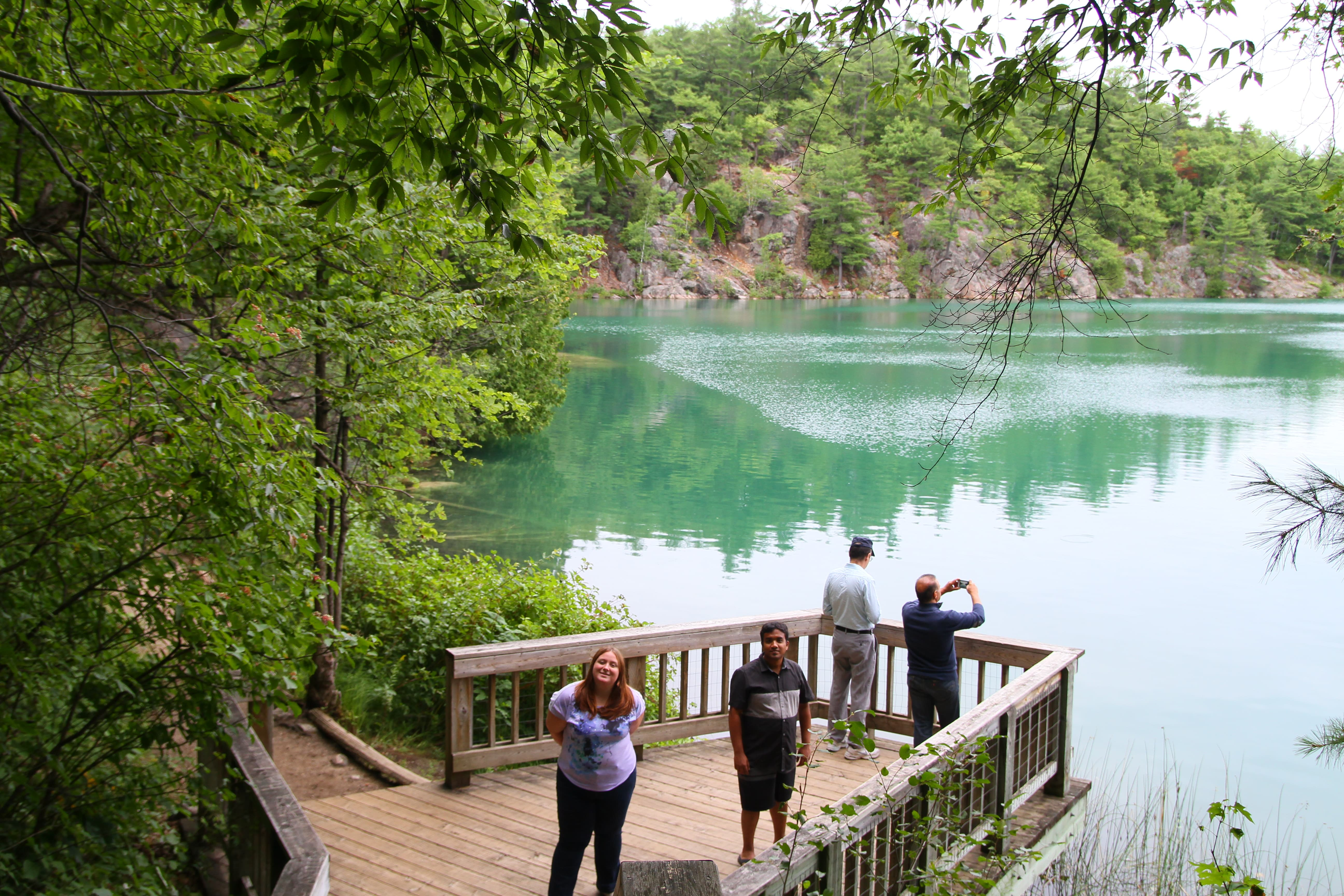
The lake looks extremely green during the months of August and September due to excessive growth of algae

Pink Lake is a meromictic lake located in Gatineau Park, Quebec, Canada. The surface of the waters are a deep green during the month of August and September due to the abundance of algae in the water. The lake is in danger of eutrophication due to human activities. Park management forbids swimming in the lake, walking domestic animals near it, straying from the wooden boardwalk for sight-seers, and throwing stones into the lake.

== History ==
Pink Lake is named after a family of Irish settlers who in 1826 cleared a farm in the area. It used to be a salt water lake as a part of the oceans. It took over 3000 years for the lake to turn from salt water to fresh water (generally a lake of this size shouldn't take over a few decades) and as a result some of the salt water fish adapted to fresh water.

== Properties ==
Due to the meromictic properties of Pink Lake, there are ancient forms of bacteria that use sulfur instead of oxygen to perform photosynthesis. These bacteria form a layer about 7 metres from the bottom to avoid the oxygenated water and maximize sunlight exposure.

Pink Lake also has a desalinized variant of the three-spined stickleback fish.

In 2006, research was in progress to identify the patterns of atmospheric conditions over the past 10,000 years by examining the annual deposits of sediment in Pink Lake.

== Popular culture ==
Pink Lake plays a symbolic role in the novel Wash This Blood Clean From My Hand by Fred Vargas.

The 2020 film Pink Lake was shot on the lake, at the real-life cottage of cast member Charles Brook.
