= No Visible Trauma =

2020 Canadian documentary film

- Film poster
- Directed by: Marc Serpa Francoeur; Robinder Uppal
- Written by: Marc Serpa Francoeur; Robinder Uppal
- Produced by: Geoff Morrison; Marc Serpa Francoeur; Robinder Uppal
- Cinematography: Daniel Froidevaux
- Edited by: Marc Serpa Francoeur; Robinder Uppal
- Music by: Christine Bougie; Joel Visentin
- Production companies: Big Cedar Films; Lost Time Media
- Release date: September 18, 2020 (VIFF)
- Running time: 98 minutes
- Country: Canada
- Language: English

No Visible Trauma is a 2020 Canadian documentary film, directed by Marc Serpa Francoeur and Robinder Uppal. The film documents several allegations of abuse of power against the Calgary Police.

== Synopsis ==
It centres on the cases of Godfred Addai-Nyamekye, a person of colour who was involuntarily transported to the city limits and left to freeze in below-zero weather after a routine traffic stop, and was eventually tasered and beaten by the police officer who responded after Addai-Nyamekye called 911; Daniel Haworth, a man who suffered a permanent brain injury when he was thrown to the ground by the same police officer who had tasered Addai-Nyamekye, eventually contributing to Haworth's subsequent death of a drug overdose; and Anthony Heffernan, a man who died after being shot four times by police on an apparently routine wellness check.

== Critical reception ==
Now described the story telling as simple and direct and praised the documentary for avoiding stylistic drama and just telling the clear story of police abuse of power.

== Television edit ==
A shorter edit of the film, titled Above the Law, aired on CBC Television in July 2020 as an episode of CBC Docs POV, prior to the full film's theatrical premiere at the 2020 Vancouver International Film Festival. Above the Law received a nomination for the Donald Brittain Award at the 9th Canadian Screen Awards in 2021.

== See also ==
- Killing of Latjor Tuel
