= Never Steady, Never Still =

2017 Canadian drama film

- Film poster
- Directed by: Kathleen Hepburn
- Written by: Kathleen Hepburn
- Produced by: James Brown; Tyler Hagan
- Starring: Shirley Henderson; Théodore Pellerin; Nicholas Campbell; Mary Galloway
- Cinematography: Norm Li
- Edited by: Simone Smith
- Music by: Ben Fox
- Production companies: Christie Street Creative; Experimental Forest Films
- Distributed by: Thunderbird Releasing
- Release date: 9 September 2017 (TIFF)
- Running time: 112 minutes
- Country: Canada
- Language: English

Never Steady, Never Still is a Canadian drama film, which premiered at the 2017 Toronto International Film Festival.

The full-length directorial debut of Kathleen Hepburn, the film is a family drama which stars Shirley Henderson as Judy, a woman struggling with the advancing symptoms of Parkinson's disease while her son Jamie (Théodore Pellerin) is struggling to come to terms with his identity.

The film is an expansion of Hepburn's earlier short film of the same title, which starred Tina Hedman as Judy and Dylan Playfair as Jamie and is partially based on Hepburn's own experiences with her mother's Parkinson's. Hepburn also wrote the screenplay for the film.

== Plot ==
Judy and her husband Ed live with their 18-year-old son Jamie in a remote, isolated community at the edge of Stuart Lake, British Columbia. Judy has suffered from Parkinson's disease for 19 of the 23 years she and Ed have been married, with Ed acting as her supportive caregiver, helping her to complete basic tasks such as getting dressed and taking her medication. Despite her illness, Judy attempts to lead a normal life by attending a Parkinson's support group each week to help manage her disease. Jamie spends most of his time hanging out with his best friend Danny, smoking and playing hockey. When Danny moves away for college, Jamie finds himself at loose ends, struggling to fully deal with the enormity of his mother's illness, and feeling left behind as Danny's phone calls become more sporadic. Ed convinces Jamie to get a job in the Alberta oil fields.

Jamie finds it somewhat difficult to fit in with his overly macho co-workers and the testosterone-fuelled environment they create by frequently discussing topics that make him uncomfortable, such as sex and violence, and by relentlessly bullying him. He struggles with his sexuality and briefly fantasizes about kissing Danny. After returning from her support group one day, Judy finds Ed face down in the water, having suffered a fatal heart attack. Jamie returns for the funeral and offers to move back home in order to look after Judy but she refuses, telling him he has to go and live his life. When she asks if he enjoys his job, he lies. Without Ed, Judy begins to find daily life more and more challenging but fiercely battles to remain independent. She often wakes up early in the morning and goes to sit on a boat in the lake where Ed drowned as a way to try to maintain their connection. While shopping in town, the cashier, a pregnant 17-year-old girl named Kaly, tells Judy that the store operates a home delivery service should she require it. Judy is pulled over when driving home because she is driving erratically and the police officer suspects that she is drunk. After explaining that she just needs to take her pills, he advises her that it is probably best she not drive unless she has taken her medications. As winter intensifies, tasks such as chopping firewood become even more difficult, so Judy begins having her groceries delivered. Kaly befriends Judy, who in turn provides her with advice about her impending motherhood.

The death of his father causes Jamie to spiral and he uses cocaine after finding some that his supervisor Daryl has dropped. When Daryl chastises him for working too slowly, Jamie lashes out and the two men get into a fight, but Daryl is blamed and their boss tells Jamie that he is free to continue working as long as he passes a drug test. Jamie refuses to take the test and walks off the job. He pays a female prostitute to give him oral sex but he does not enjoy it, and he destroys his car windshield in a fit of rage when it won't start. He returns home where he meets Kaly during one of her deliveries. Judy asks Jamie to pick up her pills and, while in town, he visits Kaly at work and asks her about her baby's father. She explains that he has taken an out-of-town job and she thinks he is scared. Although initially resistant, Jamie persuades her to meet him after her shift. They discuss his mother, and he says that he finds it difficult to see her slowly deteriorate knowing that there is no chance she will get better. He then asks Kaly if she has ever been with another girl before admitting that he is confused and has thought about being with Danny. She kisses him and the two have a sexual encounter in his car. Afterwards, Kaly asks if he enjoyed it and he tells her that he did.

Jamie drives home and finds all of the lights turned off. Judy calls to him from the bathroom and he finds her lying in freezing cold water, unable to get out because she has not taken her pills. He carries her to her bed and helps her get dressed before breaking down in tears. He apologizes for not bringing her medication sooner but she tells him not to worry. She then apologizes to him, saying that she should be the one supporting him as opposed to the other way around. They embrace and promise to be there for one another. The next morning, Judy wakes up early and makes her way to the now-frozen lake where she sits down and talks to Ed, wishing him a Merry Christmas.

== Cast ==
- Shirley Henderson as Judy, a woman in her 50s who is suffering from Parkinson's disease
- Théodore Pellerin as Jamie, Judy's rudderless son who is struggling with his identity
- Nicholas Campbell as Ed, Judy's husband and carer
- Mary Galloway as Kaly, a cashier that befriends Judy and Jamie, acting as a source of comfort to both
- Lorne Cardinal as Lenny, Ed and Judy's neighbour and friend
- Jonathan Whitesell as Danny, Jamie's best friend
- Jared Abrahamson as Daryl, Jamie's co-worker with whom he frequently clashes
- Hugo Ateo as Manuel, Daryl's brother and Jamie's co-worker
- Sean Owen Roberts as Dave, one of Jamie's co-workers
- Beverley Elliott as Sylvia, the woman in charge of running the support group that Judy attends
- Sheila Patterson as Nadine, a member of Judy's support group
- Eric Keenleyside as Don Camdon, Jamie's boss
- Kelly Metzger as Margie, a member of Judy's support group
- Mel Tuck as Horst, a member of Judy's support group
- Chilton Craine as Wanda, the prostitute that Jamie visits
- Steven Cree Molison as The Sheriff who pulls Judy over

== Reception ==
=== Critical reception ===
On the review aggregator website Rotten Tomatoes, 79% of 29 critics' reviews are positive. The website's consensus reads: "Subtle, slow, and nearly unbearably sad, Never Steady, Never Still lives and dies in its performances -- and thankfully, the soft-spoken strength of Shirley Henderson is enough to keep a steady pulse." Metacritic, which uses a weighted average, assigned the film a score of 70 out of 100, based on 9 critics, indicating "generally favorable" reviews.

Shirley Henderson received critical acclaim for her role as Judy, with The Irish Times calling it a "career-best performance" and an "extraordinary, detailed turn". Similarly, Screen Daily stated that "not only does [Henderson] convincingly embody the relentless motion of Judy's disease, but also encapsulates the dignified resilience of a life lived with the affliction" before going on to say that her performance is a "tour de force which is, at times, devastating to watch". Henderson was referred to as the "highlight" of the film by reviewers at the Glasgow Film Festival, explaining that "she never comes across as a victim of her disease, but rather as a strong individual who manages to cope in spite of her disability".

=== Awards and accolades ===
The original short film version of Never Steady, Never Still won the award for Best Canadian Short Film at the 2015 Inside Out Film and Video Festival, and was named to the Toronto International Film Festival's annual year-end Canada's Top Ten list for 2015.

At the 2017 Vancouver International Film Festival, the feature film version won three juried awards:

- Sea to Sky Award (recognizing exceptional work of a female key creative on a British Columbia-produced feature or short film)
- BC Emerging Filmmaker Award
- Emerging Canadian Director

Hepburn was nominated for the Directors Guild of Canada's DGC Discovery Award.

In December, TIFF named the feature film to its annual Canada's Top Ten list.

The film was tied with Ava and Hochelaga, Land of Souls for the most nominations in film categories at the 6th Canadian Screen Awards, earning eight nominations:

- Best Picture
- Best Actress (Henderson)
- Best Screenplay (Hepburn)
- Best Cinematography (Norm Li)
- Best Art Direction/Production Design (Sophie Jarvis and Liz Cairns)
- Best Sound (Matt Drake, Nate Evans and Christopher O'Brien)
- Best Editing (Simone Smith)
- Best Original Score (Ben Fox).

== See also ==
- List of LGBT-related films directed by women
