= I Fear Blue Skies =

- Directed by: Salar Pashtoonyar
- Screenplay by: Salar Pashtoonyar
- Produced by: Salar Pashtoonyar
- Starring: Ahmad Zaki; Sami Asir
- Cinematography: Salar Pashtoonyar
- Edited by: Fjordi Spahiu
- Release date: September 6, 2025 (TIFF)
- Running time: 12 minutes
- Country: Canada
- Languages: Dari; Pashto

I Fear Blue Skies is a Canadian short drama film, directed by Salar Pashtoonyar and released in 2025. Set in Afghanistan during the 2020–2021 U.S. troop withdrawal from Afghanistan, the film stars Ahmad Zaki as an Afghan man who must meet with a Taliban minister (Sami Asir) to request permission to restart an American-backed organization he previously worked for so that he can secure a visa to escape the country.

The film premiered at the 2025 Toronto International Film Festival, where it was named the winner of the Vimeo Staff Pick award.
