= Ten Thousand Roses =

Ten Thousand Roses: The Making of a Feminist Revolution
- Author: Judy Rebick
- Subjects: Feminism; Sociology
- Published: 18 February 2005
- Publication place: Canada
- Media type: Print
- Pages: 280
- ISBN: 9780143015444
- OCLC: 57065161

Ten Thousand Roses: The Making of a Feminist Revolution is a book written by Canadian journalist, political activist, and feminist Judy Rebick. The book is made up of the experiences of over 100 feminists in Canada from the 1960s through the 1990s.

== Book analysis ==
Ten Thousand Roses is structured chronically along the latest four decades of intense feminist activity in Canada, from the 1960s through the 1990s. For each decade in Rebick's book, she begins by contextualizing the movement within the broader social, political and economic climate of the time, looking particularly at the North American Context. Rebick also includes brief references to other social justice movements of the time (such as the anti-Vietnam war movement in the 1960s and 70s) and how feminism interacted with them. Each chapter focuses on a specific sector (such as the Quebec women's movement or Aboriginal women's struggles), issue (such as male violence against women or childcare) or mass action (such as the Abortion Caravan).

Out of the twenty chapters, a third of the book is dedicated to issues such as violence against women, abortion, childcare, equality in the workplace, wages, and so on. These issues are discussed to show how major material issues that are still problematic affect women. Many chapters are devoted to single topics, such as the chapter by Kara Gillies about "trafficking". Others have multiple issues that are confronted from political standpoints to disabilities and physical characteristics that women possess.

== Reception ==
Critical reception for Ten Thousand Roses has been generally positive. Sherrill Cheda of the journal Canadian Woman Studies praised the novel for perfectly describing the feminist movement in Canada while paralleling other major social changes occurring during the time period. Cheda stated “This book belongs in every Canadian library, whether high school, college or university, as an important part of our history, witnessed by those who lived it.” Another reviewer praised the book for its easy-to-read format, and its impact on the feminist movement, stating “Ten Thousand Roses shows the scars as well as the stars—and both are the embodiment of our movement.”

Some critics do offer negative criticism. For instance, although one reviewer praises the book for its impact on tracing Canadian feminism, there is a clear bias towards the National Action Committee on the Status of Women, failing to mention other feminist organizations. As the review states, “Rebick’s book may be faulted for being too ‘NACcentric.’ Many women in Canada — the underrated silent majority — support feminist goals without necessarily joining organizations. Many activists who were members of women's organizations, including NAC, nonetheless chose not to participate in NAC conferences.”
