= Evangeline (2013 film) =

- Film poster
- Directed by: Karen Lam
- Written by: Karen Lam
- Produced by: Karen Lam and Karen Wong
- Starring: Kat de Lieva and Richard Harmon
- Cinematography: Michael Balfry
- Edited by: Jeanne Slater
- Music by: Patric Caird
- Production company: Opiate Pictures
- Distributed by: Uncork'd Entertainment (USA)
- Release date: September 28, 2013 (Stockholm)
- Running time: 85 minutes
- Country: Canada
- Language: English

Evangeline is a 2013 Canadian horror/thriller film, which was written and directed by Karen Lam.

== Cast ==
- Kat de Lieva as Evangeline Pullman
- Richard Harmon as Michael Konner
- Mayumi Yoshida as Shannon
- David Lewis as Mr. K
- Kelvin Redvers as Billy
- John Shaw as Jim
- Nelson Leis as Dee
- Dejan Loyola as Ali
- Madison Smith as Mitch
- Anthony Shim as Mark
- Natalie Grace as Molly
- Ella Kosor as Clara
- Lucy Harvey as Brandice

== Production ==
According to Lam, the script of Evangeline was motivated by reactions to the Pickton murders in the Vancouver area, and the Highway of Tears murders in northern British Columbia.

== Reception ==
The film is described as a supernatural revenge fantasy, about a university student (played by Kat de Lieva) who is beaten and left for dead in the woods. Underpinning the film is a religious theme: the dilemma of eye for an eye (retributive justice) versus turning the other cheek.

== Awards ==
Evangeline received nine nominations for the Leo Awards, winning two. The film also won two awards, Best Director and Best Cinematography, at the 2013 Blood in the Snow Canadian Film Festival.

== Release ==
The film premiered on September 28, 2013 in the Monsters of Film festival, in Stockholm, and opened the 2014 Vancouver International Women in Film Festival. The film was released in the United States as Direct to video production, on 8 May 2015 on Video on Demand and on June 9, 2015 on DVD and Blu-ray.
