= Cake Day =

2020 Canadian short film

- Directed by: Phillip Thomas
- Written by: Phillip Thomas
- Produced by: Spencer Foley; Phillip Thomas
- Starring: Cameron Crosby; Steven Roberts
- Cinematography: Liam Mitchell
- Edited by: Phillip Thomas
- Music by: Jeremy Wallace Maclean
- Production companies: Superfan Pictures; Image Nation Films
- Distributed by: H264 Distribution
- Release date: March 11, 2020 (Regard)
- Running time: 15 minutes
- Country: Canada
- Language: English

Cake Day is a Canadian short drama film, directed by Phillip Thomas and released in 2020. The film stars Cameron Crosby as a recovering narcotics addict who is about to celebrate his five-year anniversary of sobriety in Narcotics Anonymous, but must struggle with whether or not to be honest in the meeting about the fact that he relapsed the night before.

The film's cast also includes Steven Roberts as his sponsor Bill and Diana Lepine-Thomas as his mother, as well as Spencer Foley, Bradley Stryker, Jeremy Wallace Maclean, John Duncan, Joe Buffalo, Blair Buchholz and Koshiki Tanaka in supporting roles.

The film premiered on March 11, 2020 at the Saguenay International Short Film Festival. It was subsequently screened at the 2020 Vancouver International Film Festival, where it won the award for Best British Columbia Short Film.

Crosby won the Leo Award for Best Actor in a Short Drama in 2021.
