= Salar Pashtoonyar =

Afghan Canadian film director

Salar Pashtoonyar is an Afghan Canadian film director.

His 2020 short film Bad Omen was made as his thesis project for his film degree at York University, and won the Lindalee Tracey Award for emerging filmmakers at the 2020 Hot Docs Canadian International Documentary Festival.

The film had its public premiere at the 2020 Vancouver International Film Festival, where it won the award for Best Canadian Short Film. It received a Canadian Screen Award nomination for Best Live Action Short Drama at the 9th Canadian Screen Awards, and won a Bronze Medal from the Student Academy Awards in 2021.

He followed up with the short films Hills and Mountains in 2022, and Children of War in 2024.

His 2025 short film I Fear Blue Skies premiered at the 2025 Toronto International Film Festival, where it was named the winner of the Vimeo Staff Pick award.

== Filmography ==
- Jack the Hat - 2015
- Hope - 2016
- Forsaken - 2016
- Cotyledon - 2016
- Sahil - 2017
- Jummah - 2019
- Screaming on the Inside - 2019
- Bad Omen - 2020
- Hills and Mountains - 2022
- Children of War - 2024
- I Fear Blue Skies - 2025
