= Girls Shouldn't Walk Alone at Night =

2020 Canadian short film

- French: Les filles ne marchent pas seules la nuit
- Directed by: Katerine Martineau
- Written by: Katerine Martineau
- Produced by: Guillaume Collin
- Starring: Amaryllis Tremblay; Nahéma Ricci
- Cinematography: Alexandre Nour Desjardins
- Edited by: Ibticème Benalia
- Music by: Paloma Daris
- Production company: Arpent Films
- Distributed by: H264 Distribution
- Release date: September 24, 2020 (VIFF)
- Running time: 17 minutes
- Country: Canada
- Language: French

Girls Shouldn't Walk Alone at Night (French: Les filles ne marchent pas seules la nuit) is a 2020 Canadian short drama film, directed by Katerine Martineau. The film stars Amaryllis Tremblay and Nahéma Ricci as Chantal and Delphine, two young women who open up about their feelings for each other while walking home from their high school graduation party.

The film premiered at the 2020 Vancouver International Film Festival. It was subsequently screened at the 2021 Canadian Film Festival, where Martineau won the award for Best Director of a Short Film and Tremblay won the award for Breakout Performance in a Short Film, and at the 2021 Saguenay International Short Film Festival, where it won the 100% Régions award.

The film won the Canadian Screen Award for Best Live Action Short Drama at the 10th Canadian Screen Awards in 2022.
