= Jessie Anthony =

Onondaga director, screenwriter and producer

Jesse Anthony is an Onondaga director, screenwriter, and producer from Six Nations of the Grand River Territory in Ontario.

== Career ==
Anthony was accepted into and graduated from Vancouver Film School's acting program. She later turned her focus to filmmaking, attending Capilano University's School of Motion Picture Arts in the Indigenous Independent Digital Filmmaking Program. For her graduation project, Anthony created a short film that would become the inspiration for her debut feature film, Brother, I Cry.

Anthony's 2020 feature film Brother, I Cry follows Jon, an Indigenous father-to-be as he tries to stay sober and out of jail, and his relationship with the women in his life; his sister, mother, and girlfriend. The story was inspired by Anthony's brother's addiction, her cousin's overdose, and her connection to the spirit world. Brother, I Cry had its world premiere at the Vancouver International Film Festival and was made in Telefilm’s Talent to Watch program. At the festival, the film earned Anthony the B.C. Best Emerging Filmmaker Award. Anthony's production company, Pass Through Productions Inc. also released El Color Negro at the 2020 VIFF.

In 2019, Anthony and Mary Galloway won the APTN/imagineNATIVE Web Series Pitch Competition for the LGBTQ+ web series Querencia. They received additional funding for the project through the Canadian Film Academy’s Telefilm Talent to Watch, which allowed them to expand the series.

In 2020, Jessie Anthony was selected as a mentor by the Indigenous Screen Office (ISO) for its Netflix Apprenticeship and Cultural Mentorship Program. Anthony mentored Saddle Lake Cree Nation filmmaker Tanis Redcrow on the set of Querencia.

Anthony was selected as part of the pilot program for the ISO-DGC Director Fellowship Program. In 2022, Anthony was mentored by Dana Gonzalez on the set of The Handmaid's Tale.

== Personal life ==
Anthony was born and raised on Six Nations of the Grand River Territory, Ontario, as part of Onondaga Nation, Beaver clan. She now works and lives in Vancouver, British Columbia.

== Filmography ==
Film
Year	TItle	Credited as			Notes
		Director	Writer	Producer	
2016	He'ge'ah: Little Brother	Yes	Yes	Yes	Short film
2017	O for a Thousand Tongues			Yes	Short film
2017	Luka			Yes	Short film
2018	Pookmis			Yes	Short film
2019	My Father's Footsteps			Yes	Short film
2020	Brother, I Cry	Yes	Yes		Feature Film Nominated- VFCC One to Watch Award. Nominated- Directors Guild of Canada, Outstanding Directorial Achievement, Feature Film. Nominated- Leo Awards, Best Motion Picture. VIFF BC Emerging Filmmaker Award. VIWIFF, Best Screenplay Award. Leo Awards, Best Direction in a Motion Picture. Leo Awards, Best Screen Writing in a Motion Picture.
2020	El Color Negro			Yes	Short film
2022	El Mulatto			Yes	Short film
2022	Good Grief			Yes	Short film
2023	Meditation 4 Black Women			Yes	Short film

TV shows
Year	TItle	Credited as			Notes
		Director	Writer	Producer	
2021	Querencia			Yes	8 episodes, co-nominated with Mary Galloway for Best Web Series at the 2022 Leo Awards and Best Web Program or Series, Fiction at the 2022 Canadian Screen Awards.
2022	Heritage Minutes		Yes		Season 8, Episode 3 "Tom Longboat".
2022	Acting Good		Yes		Senior story editor for Season 1 (10 episodes), writer for 1 episode (Season 1, Episode 3 "Three Nobodies").
2023	Amplify	Yes			Season 2, Episode 2.

Music videos

- Producer, Mother Mother "Pure Love", 2021.
- Producer, Mother Mother "Sick of the Silence", 2021.
