= Emmanuel Tardif =

Canadian (Quebec) film director

- Occupation: Filmmaker
- Notable work: In Broad Daylight

Emmanuel Tardif (also known as Emmanuel Gendron-Tardif) is a Canadian film director, producer, and screenwriter from Quebec. He is most noted for his 2022 film In Broad Daylight (Au grand jour), which premiered in the Proxima competition for emerging filmmakers at the 56th Karlovy Vary International Film Festival.

An alumnus of Concordia University, Tardif made the short films Desire (2015), Miami (2016) and Sunrise (2016) before releasing his full-length debut film Speak Love in 2019. He followed up in 2021 with Heirdoms (Soumissions).

With Léa Roy and Marie-Élaine Bédard, Tardif formed the production company Les Rapailleurs.

On January 26, 2023, Tardif was charged with second-degree murder in the death of his mother, Lysane Gendron, who was found dead in a Fullum Street apartment in Montreal on January 25. His arrest scuppered the planned commercial release of In Broad Daylight. He believed his life was like the 1998 film The Truman Show and that his mother was not his real mother. He has schizophrenia and was found to be not criminally responsible for killing her. He is confined to the Philippe-Pinel psychiatric hospital.
