= Olga Korsak =

Latvian figure skater

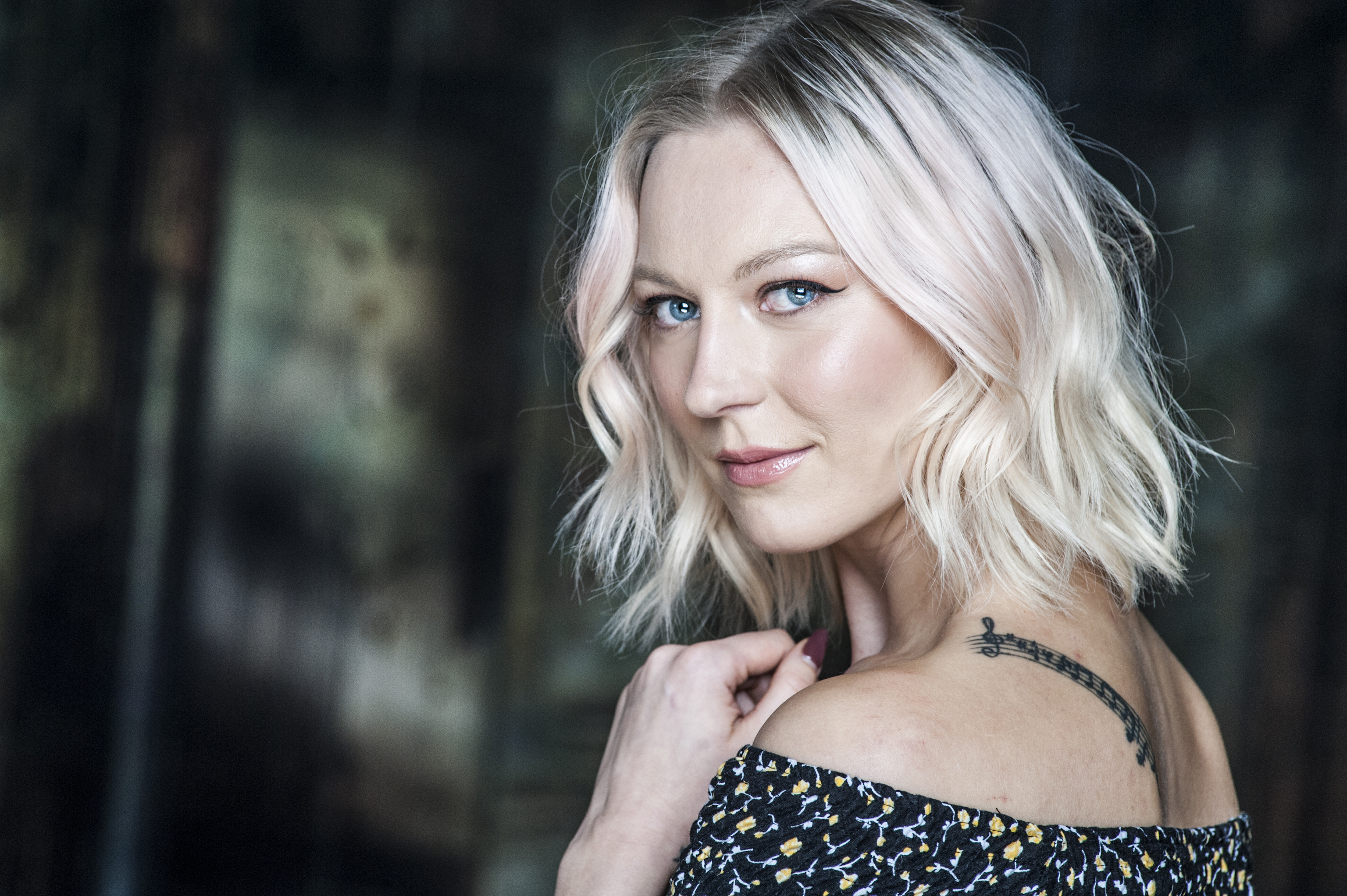
- Promotional photo of Olga Korsak for the film The Petrichor

Personal information
- Born: February 10, 1988 (age 38)
- Height: 1.71 m (5 ft 7 1/2 in)

Figure skating career
- Country: Latvia
- Coach: Marika Nugumanova
- Skating club: Marika's Skating Club, Riga

Olga Korsak (born February 10, 1989, in Riga, Latvia) is a former competitive figure skater for Latvia, and is now an actress and singer/songwriter living in Toronto, Ontario, Canada. She is the 2006-2007 Latvian National Champion, as well as earning silver in 2004-2005, and bronze in 2002-2003.

In 2006, Olga suffered a back injury while trying to qualify at the World Figure Championships in Calgary, Alberta, Canada. Her injury forced her to retire from figure skating.

After graduating from the Latvian Academy of Sports Education, with a Bachelor of Arts Degree in Dance Stage Production & Fitness, she moved to Toronto, Canada in October 2009 to pursue her dream of becoming an actress and singer/songwriter.

As her music stage name of LIVVA, she achieved recognition in 2014 with her self-released debut album, Behind Closed Doors, which sold more than 10,000 copies in Canada.

After a few independent multilingual films, she was cast in 2018 as the lead in Junga Song's movie The Petrichor alongside famous Russian star Aleksei Serebryakov (which also featured the 2015 Junior, 2016 and 2017 Senior World Champion and 2018 Olympic double silver medalist Evgenia Medvedeva in a cameo). The film follows the story of Maya, a former figure skater who, due to personal tragedy, fails her first two attempts at senior international competition. Inspired by her skating idol, Igor Rusky, she decides at the age of thirty to get back on the ice and pursue her dream of competing once more.

The Petrichor premiered at the Moscow International Film Festival on October 2, 2020. The film won Best Feature Film and Olga won Best Actress at the Canadian Cinematography Awards and many more awards are followed in 2020.

== Awards ==
Year	Nominee / work	Award	Result
2020	The Petrichor	Oniros film awards - Best Actress	Won

Year	Nominee / work	Award	Result
2020	The Petrichor	Canadian Cinematography Awards - Best Actress	Won

Year	Nominee / work	Award	Result
2020	The Petrichor	American Golden Picture International Film Festival - Best Actress	Won

Year	Nominee / work	Award	Result
2020	The Petrichor	Gold Movie Awards - Best Actress	Won

Year	Nominee / work	Award	Result
2020	The Petrichor	Best Actor Award - Silver award	Won

Year	Nominee / work	Award	Result
2020	The Petrichor	American Golden Picture International Film Festival - Best Actress	Won

Year	Nominee / work	Award	Result
2020	The Petrichor	Venice Film Awards - Best Soundtrack (Not Afraid to Fall - LIVVA)	Won

Year	Nominee / work	Award	Result
2020	The Petrichor	Tracks Music Awards - Best Original Song (Not Afraid to Fall - LIVVA)	Won

Year	Nominee / work	Award	Result
2020	The Petrichor	Oniros Film Awards - Best Sound track (Not Afraid to Fall - LIVVA)	Nominated

Year	Nominee / work	Award	Result
2020	The Petrichor	American Golden Picture International Film Festival - Best Composer (Not Afraid to Fall - LIVVA)	Nominated
