= Karen Lam =

Canadian director, writer and producer

- Born: Brandon, Manitoba
- Occupations: Film director, film producer, screenwriter
- Years active: 2000–present
- Website: karenlamfilms.com

Karen Lam is a Canadian director, writer and producer. She is known for the horror film Evangeline (2013).

== Life and career ==
Karen Lam grew up in Brandon, Manitoba. Lam's father, a professor, would show his daughter horror films that she cites as an influence for her work. Lam also lists Gothic literature and Asian horror films as influences.

After receiving a law degree from the University of British Columbia, Lam began working at BC Film. From there she started producing films which lead to writing and directing. Lam's first featured-length film was Stained (2010), a thriller starring Tinsel Korey. A year later the horror revenge short Doll Parts (2011) was released and distributed, which Lam credits for paving the way for Stained to get viewership in the United States.

=== Evangeline ===
Karen Lam wrote and directed Evangeline, a revenge horror film based on the Pickton murders, and the Highway of Tears murders in British Columbia, as well as violence against women in general. It stars Kat de Lieva as a university student seeking revenge against those who beat her. At the 2013 Blood in the Snow Canadian Film Festival the film won Best Cinematography, and for Lam, Best Director.

=== Armageddon Road ===
Karen Lam wrote and directed Armageddon Road, a dark comedy that takes place in Las Vegas in 1976, where an ex-con is hired by a mob boss to drive his girlfriend around for an evening, only for her to die of a cocaine overdose and have her body taken over by one of the Horsemen of the Apocalypse. It stars Natalie Grace, Willie Aames, Brian McCaig, April Telek, and Landon Liboiron. The film uses a combination of LED volume walls and miniature sets created by Gary Young.

The film premiered at the Fantaspoa 2026 film festival. The film's theatrical release began in September 2026 with screenings in Canada, including a screening at the Revue Cinema in Toronto with Lam and cast..

== Filmography ==
Short film

Year	Title	Director	Writer	Ref.
2007	The Cabinet	Yes	Yes	
2011	Doll Parts	Yes	Yes	
2015	Chiral	Yes	Yes	
2017	7 from Etheria	Co-director	No	

Feature film

Year	Title	Director	Writer	Producer	Ref.
2010	Stained	Yes	Yes	No	
2013	Evangeline	Yes	Yes	No	
2020	The Curse of Willow Song	Yes	Yes	Yes	
2022	Bring It On: Cheer or Die	Yes	No	No	
2026	Armageddon Road	Yes	Yes	Yes	

== Awards and nominations ==
Year	Title	Award/Nomination
2013	Evangeline	Blood in the Snow Film Festival Award for Best Director; Nominated for Toronto Female Eye Film Festival Jury Award for Best Canadian Feature
2015	Chiral	Blood in the Snow Film Festival Award for Best Short Film
2020	The Curse of Willow Song	Best BC Film, 2020 Vancouver International Film Festival
