= Animac =

International animation film festival in Spain

- Status: Active
- Genre: Animation
- Location: Lleida
- Country: Spain
- Inaugurated: 1996; 30 years ago
- Organizer: City Council of Lleida; Regional Government of Catalonia
- Website: www.animac.cat

Animac, subtitled, International Animation Film Festival of Catalonia, is a non-competitive festival that takes place in Lleida, Spain, that shows a selection of animation done all over the world. It is organised by the City Council of Lleida and the Regional Government of Catalonia.

The festival was created in 1996 as Cinemagic 96, International Animation Film Festival, to celebrate the hundredth anniversary of the cinema. It was under the direction of Eladi Martos and Jordi Artigas and was promoted by Lleida's Cultural Department and the local Fine Arts School, together with ASIFA Catalunya. In 1997 it was renamed Animac, International Animation Film Festival, and in 2006, to Animac, International Animation Film Festival of Catalonia.
