= Flowers of the Field (film) =

2020 Canadian drama film

- Film poster
- Directed by: Andrew Stanley
- Written by: Andrew Stanley
- Produced by: Sarah Buell; William L. Roberts
- Starring: Alex Crowther; Ryan Hollyman; Kristopher Turner
- Cinematography: Jeremy Cox
- Edited by: Rick Bartram
- Production company: Birchwolfe Productions
- Release date: September 24, 2020 (VIFF)
- Running time: 75 minutes
- Country: Canada
- Language: English

Flowers of the Field is a 2020 Canadian drama film, directed by Andrew Stanley. The film stars Alex Crowther as Aaron Warner, a young man struggling with his sexual orientation who checks himself into a conversion therapy program run by therapist John (Ryan Hollyman).

The cast also includes Sharon McFarlane, James McDougall, Kristopher Turner and Jesse LaVercombe.

The film premiered at the 2020 Vancouver International Film Festival.

Crowther received a Vancouver Film Critics Circle nomination for Best Actor in a Canadian Film at the Vancouver Film Critics Circle Awards 2020.
