= Cup of Cheer =

2020 Canadian comedy film

- Film poster
- Directed by: Jake Horowitz
- Written by: Jake Horowitz; Andy Lewis
- Produced by: Daniel Everitt-Lock; Jake Horowitz; Andy Lewis
- Starring: Storm Steenson; Alexander Oliver; Liam Marshall; Jacob Hogan
- Cinematography: Daniel Everitt-Lock
- Music by: Braden Barrie
- Production companies: Sideways Dog Productions; True Perspective
- Distributed by: IndieCan Entertainment
- Release date: November 4, 2020
- Running time: 94 minutes
- Country: Canada
- Language: English

Cup of Cheer is a Canadian comedy Christmas film, directed by Jake Horowitz and released in 2020. A parody of the Hallmark Channel lineup of romantic Christmas television movies, the film stars Storm Steenson as Mary, a journalist who returns to her hometown of Snowy Heights to write a story about smalltown Christmas cheer, only to meet and fall in love with Chris, the owner of a hot chocolate shop at risk of failing due to the impending launch of a corporate chain competitor next door.

The cast also includes Liam Marshall as Chris's brother Keith; Jacob Hogan as Arthur, a British time traveller who insists that everybody must pronounce his name Authuh; and Helly Chester as town busybody Mrs. Clovenwitch. The film's broad humour, and parody of genre tropes, have been compared by critics to Airplane!, The Naked Gun and the Scary Movie series.

== Production and distribution ==
The film was shot primarily in Orillia, Ontario in early 2020, and was acquired for distribution by IndieCan Entertainment. With social distancing protocols still in place at movie theatres due to the COVID-19 pandemic, the film had its theatrical premiere on November 5 at the 5 Drive-In in Oakville, as the first half of a double bill with the 2003 Christmas comedy film Bad Santa. It was screened for the next three days at the Sunset Barrie Drive-In in Oro-Medonte between Orillia and Barrie, again as a double-bill with Bad Santa, and was commercially distributed in the rest of North America with a two-week free screening period on Tubi.

== Reception ==
Going by review aggregator Rotten Tomatoes, the film holds an approval rating of 64% with an average rating of 5.6/10 from critics, based on 14 reviews.

Chris Knight of Postmedia rated the film four stars out of five, writing that "In the spirit of spoofs (and of Christmas!) Horowitz packs his movie with all manner of silly humour, from running gags to blink-and-miss-it background wackiness, and leaps of illogic. It’s also the first movie I’ve seen make comedic hay of the 1944 Morgenthau Plan for post-war German disarmament." He ultimately concluded that the film would be best appreciated by people who enjoy Hallmark Christmas films in principle, but need an irreverent break from them and want to spend some time with "the holiday equivalent of a tipsy relative telling off-colour jokes after dinner".

For CTV News, Richard Crouse rated the film three stars, opining that "Essentially Cup of Cheer is a series of bad puns strung together with tinsel. Its commitment to Christmas clichés, wordplay and double entendre gags is truly remarkable but Jake Horowitz, director and co-writer (with Andy Lewis), keeps things lively with quick pacing. If you care for a joke, don’t worry, there will be another one in ten seconds. Don’t be a Grinch. It’s a dizzying onslaught well delivered by a game cast. Cup of Cheer feels like a sketch blown up to feature length and may be best enjoyed after a glass or two of your own cup of cheer of choice (unless you’re going to the drive in!)."

== See also ==
- List of Christmas films
