= Killing of Latjor Tuel =

Latjor Tuel was a Black man fatally shot by Calgary police on February 19, 2022, in Calgary, Alberta, Canada.

Tuel refused to drop his knife, and stabbed a police dog in the neck, during a lengthy confrontation with police.

== Latjor Tuel ==
Latjor Tuel was born in South Sudan and his family claimed he was a child soldier for the Sudan Peoples Liberation Army before moving to Canada as a refugee, approximately 20 years prior to being killed. His mother said he suffered post-traumatic stress disorder, and family and friends said he provided financial support to family members in South Sudan.

== Events of February 19, 2022 ==
Calgary police reported that at approximately 3:40 p.m. on February 19, 2022, they responded to a call from the public reporting a man assaulting others, while holding weapons, near a bus stop close to the intersection of 45th Street and 17th Avenue S.E. in the Forest Lawn area of Calgary. Callers reported a man carrying a knife and holding a stick, and one caller reported the man had hit someone with the stick. When officers arrived at 3:46 p.m., Tuel was holding a knife and a stick. Video of the incident shows officers speaking with Tuel as he sat on the sidewalk, and officers are repeatedly heard telling Tuel to drop or throw away his knife. At 4:02 p.m., Tuel got up and an officer discharged less-lethal baton rounds at him. Tuel then ran towards police, stabbed a police dog in the neck, and hit it with his stick. Police officers then discharged a taser at Tuel, and then surrounded Tuel, who was still holding his knife and stick. Tuel was then shot four times, by two different officers.

No police officers were injured, and the police dog, Jack, received emergency veterinary care for life-threatening injuries, and was released from hospital three days later. Tuel died at the scene.

== Reactions and response ==
While police have described Tuel as holding a weapon, multiple friends have challenged that account stating that he used a retractile cane as a mobility aid, despite sources stating that Tuel also was holding a knife. Friends have also criticized police for killing Tuel, claiming the dog was charging toward him, contrary to the account given by police and video of the incident.

Calgary's Police Chief Mark Neufeld defended the actions of his officers, "the call that the police responded to was not—when reported—about mental health. It was a complaint of an assault involving a man in possession of a knife and a stick in a busy public area". On February 23, 2022, Neufeld was questioned by the police commission about the killing and stated the Tuel may have faced systemic barriers, but also that the actions of his officers were not racially motivated.

The Alberta Serious Incident Response Team, Alberta's police oversight body, were still investigating the incident in December 2022.

Jyoti Gondek, the mayor of Calgary stated the events were devastating and tragic and that questions needed to be answered by the investigation. Calgary Black Chambers called for an inquiry into Tuel's death, and made comparisons with the Calgary Police Service's assault of Godfred Addai-Nyamekye. A GoFundMe campaign was created to raise funds to repatriate Tuel's body to South Sudan and to fund legal action.

On February 26, 2022, a crowd of demonstrators gathered in downtown Calgary calling for justice for Tuel after that representatives of the police met with Tuel's family. Tuel's mother, Rebecca Aker Akol, arrived in Canada from Sudan in December 2022 and called for justice and accountability for her son's death.
