= Randall Okita =

Canadian director and artist

- Born: Toronto, Ontario, Canada
- Occupations: Filmmaker; artist; actor
- Notable work: See for Me

Randall Okita is a Canadian filmmaker and artist from Toronto, Ontario, known for creating work that involves rich visual language and experimental approaches to storytelling. He is also known for directing the thriller film See for Me (2021).

== Career ==
His 2014 National Film Board of Canada short film The Weatherman and the Shadowboxer won the Best Canadian Short Film award at the 2014 Toronto International Film Festival, and was named to the festival's year-end Canada's Top Ten list of the year's ten best Canadian shorts. It also won awards for Best Short Film at the Festival du nouveau cinéma in Montreal, Best Experimental Short Film at both the New York Short Film Festival and LA Shorts Fest, and Best Cinematography at the Berlin International Short Film Festival.

In 2015, he was selected by Piers Handling as the recipient of a pay-it-forward grant from the Toronto Film Critics Association toward the production of a future film, following Handling's win of the organization's Clyde Gilmour Award. His feature directorial debut, The Lockpicker, was released in 2016, and received the John Dunning Discovery Award at the 5th Canadian Screen Awards in 2017. The film won the Grand Jury Award at the San Diego Asian Film Festival 2016, Best First Feature at the 2016 Reel Asian Film Festival, and Best Narrative Feature at the 2016 West Virginia International Film Festival.

In 2016, Be Here Now, an interactive multimedia installation made from feathers, wood, wire, and interactive sound and light, was part of an exhibition of artworks at the Robert Kananaj Gallery, and a part of a group exhibition at the Art Gallery of Ontario.

The Book of Distance is a room-scale virtual reality experience written and directed by Okita, which premiered at the 2020 Sundance Film Festival. Its subsequent screenings included the 2020 Vancouver International Film Festival, where it won the award for Best Animation in the Immersed program, and the 2020 Festival du nouveau cinéma, where it won the Horizons award. It won the Canadian Screen Award for Best Immersive Experience at the 9th Canadian Screen Awards in 2021.

His film See for Me premiered at the 2021 Tribeca Film Festival.

Okita directed the upcoming film Menace.

In 2024, he had an acting role in Alexander Carson's film Alberta Number One.

== Filmography ==
=== Feature film ===
- The Lockpicker (2016)
- See for Me (2021)
- Menace (TBA)

=== Short film ===
- Machine with Wishbone (2008)
- Fish in Barrel (2009)
- Transmission (2010)
- The View in Passing (2010)
- No Contract (2011)
- Portrait as a Random Act of Violence (2013)
- The Weatherman and the Shadowboxer (2014)
- Ben Heppner: Moving Through Music (2016)
- The Choir (2016)
- The Book of Distance (2020)
- Wake Me When It's Over (2022)
- Love, Leymo (2023)
