= Pink Lake (film) =

2020 Canadian drama film

- Directed by: Emily Gan; Daniel Schachter
- Written by: Emily Gan; Daniel Schachter
- Produced by: Emily Gan; Daniel Schachter; Jacob Potashnik
- Starring: Charles Brook; Alysa Touati; Marie-Marguerite Sabongui
- Cinematography: Nathalie Moliavko-Visotzky
- Edited by: Emily Gan; Daniel Schachter; Jared Curtis; Geoff Klein
- Music by: Michael Feuerstack
- Production companies: Downtown Balat; Headstrong Films
- Distributed by: Filmoption International
- Release date: September 24, 2020 (VIFF)
- Running time: 80 minutes
- Country: Canada
- Language: English

Pink Lake is a Canadian drama film, directed by Emily Gan and Daniel Schachter and released in 2020. The film centres on Sam (Charles Brook) and Cora (Alysa Touati), a couple whose relationship is tested when Sam's old friend Nadia (Marie-Marguerite Sabongui) visits to request that Sam become a sperm donor so that she can be a mother.

The film was written by Gan and Schachter based in part on their own real-life relationship debates about whether they were ready to have kids, and shot in 2019 at Brook's cottage on Pink Lake in the Outaouais region of Quebec. Apart from Sabongui and a small supporting appearance by Sophie Desmarais, it was acted principally by non-professional actors.

The film premiered in the True North program at the 2020 Vancouver International Film Festival. Due to the disruptions of film distribution caused by the COVID-19 pandemic, however, it did not go into commercial release until 2022.
