= Mary Galloway =

Cowichan film director, writer and actress

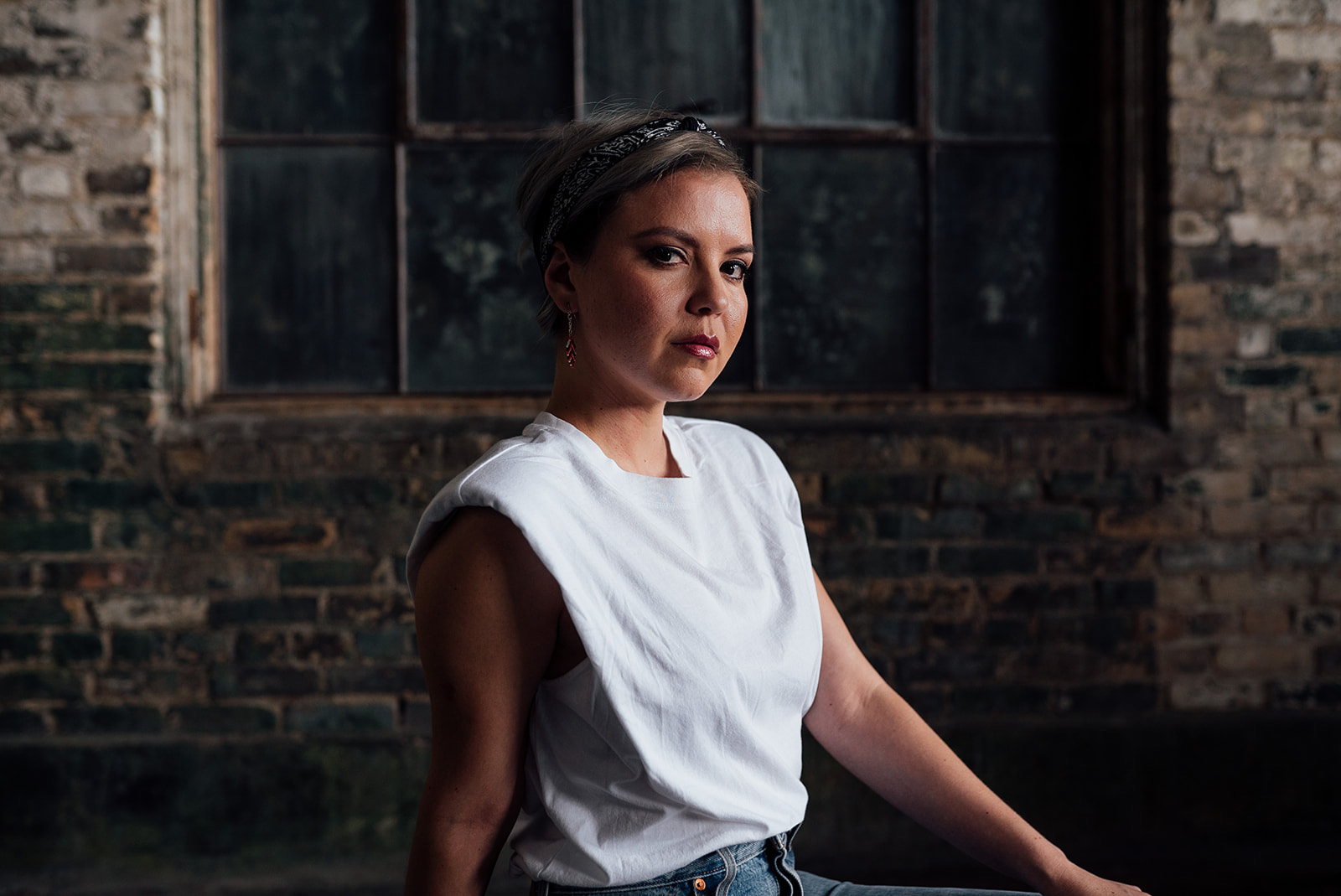
- Born: Comox, British Columbia
- Occupations: Director, writer, actress, producer
- Years active: 2011–present

Mary Galloway is a Canadian film director, writer, and actress from the Cowichan Nation. She is best known for her web series Querencia.

== Early life ==
Born in 1991, Mary Galloway grew up in Qualicum Beach and is of mixed-Cowichan and settler descent. She is the granddaughter of the late Cowichan Tribes Chief Dennis Alphonse.

She attended a 2-year intensive acting program at New Image College of Fine Arts in Vancouver before the start of her film career.

== Career ==
Galloway is a graduate of the Director's Lab at the Canadian Film Centre. Her debut short film, Unintentional Mother, premiered at the Whistler Film Festival. She was recognized as a 2017 TIFF Rising Star. In 2021, her web series, Querencia, premiered on APTN Lumi in Canada and on Revry TV globally.

== Filmography ==
Year	Title	Director	Writer	Producer	Note
2021	Playground Rules		✓		Feature Film
2021	Querencia	✓	✓	✓	Web series
2021	Better at Texting	✓	✓		Short Film
2020	Burden of Truth		✓		TV series
2019	Spirit Glitch	✓	✓	✓	Short Film
2017	Unintentional Mother	✓	✓		Short Film
2016	Ariel Unraveling	✓	✓	✓	Short Film

As actress

- 2022 – Overlord and the Underwoods
- 2021 – Playground Rules
- 2021 – Querencia
- 2020 – On the 12th Date of Christmas
- 2019 – Ruthless Souls
- 2018 – Wynter
- 2018 – Colour of Scar Tissue
- 2017 – Unintentional Mother
- 2017 – Never Steady, Never Still
- 2016 – The Switch
- 2016 – A Safe Place
- 2015 – Fire Song
- 2014 – Untold Stories of the E.R.
- 2013 – Supernatural
- 2012 – Ancient Lights
- 2011 – Foreclosed

== Awards and nominations ==
Year	Result	Award	Category	Work	Ref.
2022	Nominated	Canadian Screen Awards	Best Web Program or Series, Fiction	Querencia	
2022	Nominated	Canadian Screen Awards	Audience Choice award	Querencia	
2022	Nominated	Leo Awards	Best Web Series	Querencia	
2020	Won	Gimli Film Festival	Achievement in Acting Awards	Ruthless Souls	
2016	Nominated	Leo Awards	Best Supporting Performance by a Female in a Motion Picture	Fire Song	
