= The Petrichor =

2020 film directed by Junga Song

- Movie poster
- Directed by: Junga Song
- Written by: Junga Song
- Produced by: Evgenia Protsko; Anna Kharkhourin
- Starring: Olga Korsak; Aleksei Serebryakov; Evgenia Medvedeva
- Cinematography: Ismail Atiev
- Production company: Song Film Inc.
- Release date: October 2, 2020 (Moscow International Film Festival)
- Running time: 100 minutes
- Country: Canada
- Languages: English; Russian

The Petrichor is a 2020 Canadian sports drama film written and directed by Junga Song.

== Plot ==
Maya is a former figure skater who, because of her personal tragedy, failed her first two attempts at senior international competitions. Inspired by her ice skating by Igor Rusky, at the age of thirty she decides to return to the ice and realize her dream of competition again.

== Cast ==
- Olga Korsak as Maya
- Aleksei Serebryakov as Igor Rusky
- Dave Walpole as Eric
- Diane Newling as Chloe
- Evgenia Medvedeva as cameo
- Leanne Noelle Smith as Julie
- Amy Tremblay as Olivia
