= The Curse of Willow Song =

2020 Canadian horror film

- Film poster
- Directed by: Karen Lam
- Written by: Karen Lam
- Produced by: Karen Wong; Karen Lam
- Starring: Valerie Tian; Simon Chin; Elfina Luk
- Cinematography: Thomas Billingsley
- Edited by: Jeanne Slater
- Music by: Patric Caird
- Production companies: Opiate Pictures; RNR Media
- Distributed by: Uncork'd Entertainment
- Release date: September 24, 2020 (VIFF)
- Running time: 90 minutes
- Country: Canada
- Language: English

The Curse of Willow Song is a 2020 Canadian horror thriller film written, directed and co-produced by Karen Lam. The film stars Valerie Tian as Willow Song, a young woman in Vancouver who has recently been released from prison, blending both social realism and supernatural horror as Willow grapples with choices about her life. Its cast also includes Simon Chin, Elfina Luk and Ingrid Nilson.

Lam has described The Curse of Willow Song as inspired by Japanese horror films, in particular the 1926 film A Page of Madness.

The Curse of Willow Song premiered at the 2020 Vancouver International Film Festival, where it won the award for Best British Columbia Film.
