= Events Transpiring Before, During and After a High School Basketball Game =

- Directed by: Ted Stenson
- Written by: Ted Stenson
- Produced by: Kevin Dong; Nicola Waugh
- Starring: Andrew Phung; Paul Cowling; Benjamin Arthurs; Isra Abdelrahim
- Cinematography: Guillaume Carlier
- Edited by: Guillaume Carlier; Ted Stenson
- Music by: Julianna Hindemith
- Production company: Kino Sum Productions
- Release date: September 24, 2020 (VIFF)
- Running time: 75 minutes
- Country: Canada
- Language: English

Events Transpiring Before, During and After a High School Basketball Game is a Canadian comedy film, directed by Ted Stenson and released in 2020. Set at the fictional Middleview High School in Calgary, Alberta, in 1999, the film depicts various goings-on centered around the school's largely unsuccessful basketball team, including the referee being forced to babysit his wife's dog, point guard Joel's attempts to indoctrinate his teammates in the philosophy of The Matrix, and the school's theatre students planning a protest after being denied permission to stage a "post-colonial" production of King Lear.

The film was acted by a cast of predominantly amateur local actors, apart from Andrew Phung in the role of the basketball team's assistant coach Brent. It was shot in 2019 at Calgary's Queen Elizabeth High School, and was funded by Telefilm Canada's Talent to Watch microbudget film financing program.

The film premiered on September 24, 2020, on the VIFF Connect platform of the 2020 Vancouver International Film Festival, and was screened over the next week on the virtual platforms of the 2020 Cinéfest Sudbury International Film Festival and the Calgary International Film Festival. It was screened at the 2021 Canadian Film Festival, where it won the William F. White Reel Canadian Indie award.

== See also ==
- List of basketball films
