= The Book of Distance =

2020 Canadian virtual reality film

- Film poster
- Directed by: Randall Okita
- Written by: Randall Okita
- Produced by: David Oppenheim
- Music by: Joseph Murray; Lodewijk Vos
- Animation by: Moysis Antoniou; Venkata Prashanth Bhogaraju; Kerie Green; Liam McLaughlin
- Production company: National Film Board of Canada
- Distributed by: Lockpicker Productions
- Release date: January 23, 2020 (Sundance)
- Running time: 30 minutes
- Country: Canada
- Language: English

The Book of Distance is a Canadian virtual reality documentary film, directed by Randall Okita and released in 2020. Made for the National Film Board of Canada, the film is an animated immersive environment placing the viewer inside the context of Okita's grandfather Yonezo Okita's experiences during the internment of Japanese Canadians in World War II.

The film premiered at the 2020 Sundance Film Festival. Its subsequent screenings included the 2020 Vancouver International Film Festival, where it won the award for Best Animation in the Immersed program, and the 2020 Festival du nouveau cinéma, where it won the Horizons award.

It was released commercially to the Steam, Oculus and Viveport platforms.

The film won the Canadian Screen Award for Best Immersive Experience at the 9th Canadian Screen Awards in 2021.
