= Bad Omen (film) =

2020 Canadian short drama film

- Directed by: Salar Pashtoonyar
- Written by: Salar Pashtoonyar
- Produced by: Salar Pashtoonyar
- Starring: Fereshta Afshar; Faruq Afghan
- Cinematography: Nikolay Michaylov
- Edited by: Alexander Farah; Fjordi Spahiu
- Release date: September 24, 2020 (VIFF)
- Running time: 19 minutes
- Country: Canada
- Language: Dari

Bad Omen is a 2020 Canadian short drama film, directed by Salar Pashtoonyar. The film stars Fereshta Afshar as Pari, a widowed tailor in Kabul who must find the money to pay for a pair of prescription glasses to keep her job, despite Afghan culture's social stigmatization of widows.

Made as Pashtoonyar's thesis project for his film degree at York University, the film won the Lindalee Tracey Award for emerging filmmakers at the 2020 Hot Docs Canadian International Documentary Festival. The film had its public premiere at the 2020 Vancouver International Film Festival, where it won the award for Best Canadian Short Film.

It received a Canadian Screen Award nomination for Best Live Action Short Drama at the 9th Canadian Screen Awards, and won a Bronze Medal from the Student Academy Awards in 2021.
