= Brother, I Cry =

2020 Canadian drama film

- Film poster
- Directed by: Jessie Anthony
- Written by: Jessie Anthony
- Produced by: Jessie Anthony
- Starring: Justin Rain; Lauren Hill; Eric Schweig
- Cinematography: Andy Hodgson
- Edited by: Shun Ando
- Music by: Red Heartbreaker
- Production company: Pass Through Productions
- Release date: September 24, 2020 (VIFF)
- Running time: 97 minutes
- Country: Canada
- Language: English

Brother, I Cry is a Canadian drama film, directed by Jessie Anthony and released in 2020. The film stars Justin Rain as Jon, a young First Nations man struggling with drug addiction.

The film's cast also includes Lauren Hill, Violet Cameron, Jay Cardinal Villeneuve, Eric Schweig, Odessa Shuquaya, Joe Buffalo, Sarah Kelley, Lesley Mirza and Loren Anthony.

Anthony wrote the film while studying at Capilano University, before being accepted into Telefilm Canada's Talent to Watch program. It was shot in the Vancouver area in 2018.

The film premiered at the 2020 Vancouver International Film Festival, where Anthony won the award for British Columbia Emerging Filmmaker. The film subsequently won the Audience Choice award at the 2020 ImagineNATIVE Film and Media Arts Festival.
