= Judy Versus Capitalism =

- Directed by: Mike Hoolboom
- Produced by: Mike Hoolboom
- Starring: Judy Rebick
- Cinematography: Mike Hoolboom
- Edited by: Mike Hoolboom
- Release date: January 24, 2020 (IFFR)
- Running time: 63 minutes
- Country: Canada
- Language: English

Trailer for Judy Versus Capitalism

Judy Versus Capitalism is a 2020 Canadian documentary film, directed by Mike Hoolboom. The film is an experimentally structured documentary portrait of the life of influential Canadian activist Judy Rebick, based in part on her memoir Heroes in My Head.

The film premiered in January 2020 at the International Film Festival Rotterdam, and had its Canadian premiere in May 2020 at the Hot Docs Canadian International Documentary Festival.

It was screened at the 2020 Festival du nouveau cinéma in October, winning the Grand Prix in the national competition. In December, it was named to the Toronto International Film Festival's year-end Canada's Top Ten list for 2020.
