= August 22, This Year =

- Directed by: Graham Foy
- Written by: Graham Foy
- Produced by: Daniel Montgomery; Daiva Zalnieriunas; Harland Weiss
- Narrated by: Toby Porter Quastel
- Cinematography: Graham Foy; Diego Guijarro
- Edited by: Brendan Mills
- Production company: FF Films
- Release date: 2020
- Running time: 15 minutes
- Country: Canada
- Language: English

August 22, This Year is a 2020 Canadian short drama film, written and directed by Graham Foy. The film centres on a group of people who are preparing for the end of the world on August 22.

The cast includes Beatrice Creen, Asia-Milan Geness, Elisa Gilmour, Brendan Ko, Uri Livne-Bar, Robert Nasmith, Ben Petrie, Paul Thompson and Mel Wright.

The film was named as an official selection of the Critics' Week section at the 2020 Cannes Film Festival. Although the festival was cancelled due to the COVID-19 pandemic in France, it was screened in late October as part of Festival Scope's special online presentation of the Critics' Week short films. It had its actual theatrical premiere in September at the 2020 Vancouver International Film Festival, and was later screened at the 2020 New York Film Festival and the 2020 Festival du nouveau cinéma.
