= In the Land of the Flabby Schnook =

2020 Canadian virtual reality film

- French: Au pays du cancre mou
- Directed by: Francis Gélinas
- Written by: Francis Monty
- Produced by: Francis Gélinas
- Music by: Denis Chartrand
- Animation by: Michèle Paquin; Natasha Vallée-Martin; Olivier Rousseau; Maude Paré; Anne-Marie Robert; Christina Robinson; Gabrielle Leblanc; Marc-André Paquin; Mathieu Dufresne; Éric Guérin
- Production company: couleur.tv
- Release date: September 2020 (Venice)
- Running time: 6 minutes
- Country: Canada
- Languages: English; French

In the Land of the Flabby Schnook (French: Au pays du cancre mou) is a Canadian virtual reality animated short film, directed by Francis Gélinas and released in 2020. The film tells the story of a young boy who is afraid of the dark, and his older sister's efforts to help him overcome his fears.

The film's voice cast includes Catherine Cyr, Saule Gélinas, Francis Gélinas, Lileina Joy, Monique Thomas and Daniel Judson.

The film premiered as part of the VR Expanded program at the 2020 Venice Film Festival. It was subsequently screened in the Immersed VR program at the 2020 Vancouver International Film Festival, where it received an honourable mention from the Immersed award jury, and at the 2021 online edition of the Cinequest Film & Creativity Festival, where it won the award for Best Virtual Reality Animation.

The film received a Canadian Screen Award nomination for Best Immersive Experience at the 9th Canadian Screen Awards in 2021.
