= Katerine Martineau =

Canadian film director and screenwriter

Katerine Martineau is a Canadian film director and screenwriter from Quebec, whose short film Girls Shouldn't Walk Alone at Night (Les filles ne marchent pas seules la nuit) won the Canadian Screen Award for Best Live Action Short Drama at the 10th Canadian Screen Awards in 2022.

A graduate of the Mel Hoppenheim School of Cinema at Concordia University, her student film Waiting for Lou (En attendant Lou) was selected as Concordia's submission to the student film competition at the Festival du nouveau cinéma in 2017, and won the award for best student film at the Canada's Top Ten festival in 2018.
