= Moon (2020 film) =

2020 Canadian short film

- Film poster
- French: Lune
- Directed by: Zoé Pelchat
- Written by: Zoé Pelchat
- Produced by: Mélanie S. Dubois
- Starring: Joanie Martel
- Cinematography: Derek Branscombe
- Edited by: Charles Grenier
- Music by: Maxime Fortin
- Production company: MéMO Films
- Distributed by: H264 Distribution
- Release date: September 24, 2020 (VIFF)
- Running time: 15 minutes
- Country: Canada
- Language: French

Moon (French: Lune) is a Canadian short drama film, directed by Zoé Pelchat and released in 2020. The film stars Joanie Martel as Babz, an ex-convict working as a waitress in a diner, who is set on a path to redemption when she works up the courage to ask a customer out on a date.

The film's cast also includes Alexandre Lavigne, Guillaume Gauthier, Martine Francke, Reda Guerinik and Ines Feghouli.

The film premiered at the 2020 Vancouver International Film Festival, where it received an honorable mention from the Best Canadian Short Film award jury. It was subsequently screened at other film festivals, including the Festival du nouveau cinéma, the Festival international du cinéma francophone en Acadie, the Clermont-Ferrand International Short Film Festival, and the Canadian Film Fest.

== Awards ==
The film won the award for Best Canadian Short Film at FICFA, and Martel won the award for Best Actress in a Short Film at CFF.

The film received a Prix Iris nomination for Best Live Action Short Film at the 23rd Quebec Cinema Awards in 2021.
