= The Fourfold =

2020 film by Alisi Telengut

- Directed by: Alisi Telengut
- Written by: Alisi Telengut
- Produced by: Alisi Telengut
- Edited by: Alisi Telengut
- Release date: 2020
- Running time: 8 minutes
- Country: Canada
- Language: Mongolian

The Fourfold is a Canadian animated short film, directed by Alisi Telengut and released in 2020. Animated with oil pastel drawings and mixed media, and narrated by Telengut's grandmother, the film explores animistic beliefs and shamanic rituals in Mongolia and Siberia."The Fourfold". Tënk.

The film received a Canadian Screen Award nomination for Best Animated Short at the 9th Canadian Screen Awards, and a Prix Iris nomination for Best Animated Short Film at the 23rd Quebec Cinema Awards.
