= Êmîcêtôcêt: Many Bloodlines =

2020 Canadian film

êmîcêtôsêt-Many Bloodlines
- Directed by: Theola Ross
- Written by: Theola Ross
- Produced by: Alex Bailey
- Cinematography: Alexandre Nour Desjardins
- Edited by: Lucius Dechausay
- Production company: Theola Ross Productions
- Distributed by: Winnipeg Film Group
- Release date: May 28, 2020 (Hot Docs)
- Running time: 11 minutes
- Country: Canada
- Languages: English; Cree

êmîcêtôsêt-Many Bloodlines is a Canadian documentary film, directed by Theola Ross and released in 2020. The film documents the experience of Ross, a queer-identified Cree woman, and her partner as they pursue in vitro fertilisation treatment after deciding to raise a child together.

The film premiered at the 2020 Hot Docs Canadian International Documentary Festival, where it was named the winner of the Betty Youson Award for Best Canadian Short Documentary. It subsequently won the award for Best Short Documentary Work at the 2020 imagineNATIVE Film and Media Arts Festival.

The film was named to the Toronto International Film Festival's year-end Canada's Top Ten list for short films. The film received a Canadian Screen Award nomination for Best Short Documentary at the 9th Canadian Screen Awards in 2021.
