= Jim Stanford =

Canadian economist and author

James O. Stanford, commonly known as Jim Stanford is a Canadian economist, author, and commentator. He is the founder of the Progressive Economics Forum and director of the Centre for Future Work, firstly in Canberra, Australia and in the namesake institution in Vancouver, Canada since 2024. Stanford is also an author of a column for the Canadian newspaper The Globe and Mail.

== Early life and education ==
Stanford obtained a BA in economics from the University of Calgary in 1984, a master's degree in economics from Cambridge University in 1986.

== Career ==
Stanford worked as a research economist at the Canadian Energy Research Institute from 1986 to 1989 before moving to New York City for his doctoral studies in 1990. Stanford attended the New School for Social Research and obtained a PhD in 1995, also in economics. During this time, Stanford was a research fellow at the Brookings Institution from 1992 to 1993.

In 1994, Stanford became an economist at the Canadian Auto Workers trade union, which underwent a merger into Unifor, and where he worked until 2015. He was also the Director of Economic, Social and Sectoral Policy at Unifor.

Stanford became an industry professor at McMaster University starting from 2015. In 2016 Stanford relocated to Australia, where he is the founding director of the Centre for the Future of Work, a non-partisan research organization funded by the public policy think tanks, Canadian Centre for Policy Alternatives and The Australia Institute. He is also a regular contributor on economics to Huffington Post Australia.

=== Books ===
- Economics for Everyone: A Short Guide to the Economics of Capitalism (with Tony Biddle) London; Ann Arbor, MI : Pluto Press, 2008.
- Challenging The Market: The Struggle to Regulate Work and Income (with Leah F. Vosko and the Challenging the Market Conference), 2004
- Paper Boom: Why Real Prosperity Requires a New Approach to Canada's Economy, Lorimer, 1999
- Power, Employment, and Accumulation: Social Structures in Economic Theory and Policy (with Lance Taylor and Ellen Houston) Armonk, N.Y. : M.E. Sharpe 2000
- Estimating the Effects of North American Free Trade: A Three-Country General Equilibrium Model with "Real- World" Assumptions, 1993
- Social Dumping Under North American Free Trade, 1993.
- Going South: Cheap Labour As an Unfair Subsidy in North American Free Trade, 1991

=== Other publications ===
- Sharing the Work, Sparing the Planet: Work Time, Consumption, and Ecology. (book review): in Labour/Le Travail (Digital – Jul 28, 2005)
- Gomery, upside down.(CANADA): in Catholic New Times (Digital – Jul 25, 2005)
- Janis Sarra, ed., Corporate Governance in Global Capital Markets.(Book Review): in Labour/Le Travail (Digital – Jan 25, 2006)
- Introduction.(Forum on Labour and the Economic Crisis: Can the Union Movement Rise to the Occasion?)(Essay):in Labour/Le Travail by Jim Stanford (Digital – Jan 26, 2010)
- Challenging the Market the Struggle To Regulate Work and Income (1980)
