= Foam (film) =

2020 Canadian film

- Film poster
- French: Écume
- Directed by: Omar Elhamy
- Written by: Omar Elhamy; Paul Chotel; Jonathan Beaulieu-Cyr
- Produced by: Paul Chotel; Jonathan Beaulieu-Cyr
- Starring: Hakim Loudyi; Abdelghafour Elaaziz; Papedame Diongue
- Cinematography: Casper Wolski
- Edited by: Omar Elhamy
- Music by: Melody McKiver
- Production company: Les Films Rôdeurs
- Distributed by: Les Films du 3 mars
- Release date: February 24, 2020 (Berlin)
- Running time: 28 minutes
- Country: Canada
- Language: French

Foam (French: Écume) is a Canadian short drama film, directed by Omar Elhamy and released in 2020. The film stars Hakim Loudyi as Hakim, a man whose return to work at a car wash following a stint in jail does not go as expected, when his boss announces that the car wash is closing.

The film premiered at the 70th Berlin Film Festival in February 2020. It had its Canadian premiere at the Festival du nouveau cinéma in October 2020, where it won the National Short Film Competition.

It was subsequently named to the Toronto International Film Festival's year-end Canada's Top Ten list for short films in 2020.

The film won the Prix Iris for Best Live Action Short Film at the 23rd Quebec Cinema Awards in 2021.
