= Sheed (disambiguation) =

Sheed is a nickname for the American basketball coach and former player Rasheed Wallace.

Sheed may also refer to:

- Sheed (surname)
- Sheed, American rapper, member of the Shop Boyz
- "The Sheed", a type of basketball half-court shot named for Rasheed Wallace
- Sheed Award, a photography award
- Sheed and Ward, a British publishing house

== See also ==
- Shed (disambiguation)
