= Shed (disambiguation) =

A shed is a simple, single-story, non-residential structure.

Shed, The Shed, or Shedding may also refer to:

== As a verb ==
- Woodshedding, rehearsing repeatedly to perfect a difficult musical passage (may be shortened to 'shed or 'shedding)
- Load shedding, used by utilities and building automation systems to prevent overloading available supply systems
- Moulting, how an animal routinely casts off an outer part of its body

== Arts and entertainment ==
=== Film ===
- The Shed (film), a 2019 American horror film

=== Music ===
- Shed (musician) (Rene Pawlowitz), Berlin-based DJ and producer
- Shed (album), an album by Title Fight
- "The Shed", a song by John Williamson from All the Best

=== Television ===
- Discovery Shed, a British TV channel
- Shed Productions, a British television company
- The Shed, a subsidiary structure of the fictional criminal operation Prophet Five in the television series Alias

== Places ==
- The Shed (arts center), a cultural center in New York City
- Shed End, the south stand of the Stamford Bridge football stadium in London
- Koussevitzky Music Shed, also known as "the Shed", a music venue at Tanglewood
- ‘The Shed’, a standing Terrace (stadium) at Kingsholm Stadium, the home ground of Gloucester Rugby

== Transport ==
- British Rail Class 66
- Locomotive shed, a storage shed for locomotives

== Other uses ==
- Shed (deity), an Ancient Egyptian Saviour god
- Shed (physics), a unit of cross-section
- Shed (weaving), the area through which weft yarns are woven
- The Shed at Dulwich, a hoax restaurant that was ranked number one in London on Tripadvisor

== See also ==
- Shedd Aquarium
- The Shedd Institute
- Bike shed
- Bloodshed (disambiguation)
- Watershed (disambiguation)
