= Giant grouper =

- At uShaka Marine World

Conservation status
- Data Deficient (IUCN 3.1)

Scientific classification
- Kingdom: Animalia
- Phylum: Chordata
- Class: Actinopterygii
- Division: Teleostei
- Order: Perciformes
- Family: Epinephelidae
- Genus: Epinephelus
- Species: E. lanceolatus

Binomial name
- Epinephelus lanceolatus (Bloch, 1790)

Synonyms
- List: Holocentrus lanceolatus Bloch, 1790; Promicrops lanceolatus (Bloch, 1790); Serranus lanceolatus (Bloch, 1790); Serranus geographicus Valenciennes, 1828; Serranus abdominalis Peters, 1855; Batrachus gigas Günther, 1869; Oligorus goliath De Vis, 1882; Serranus phaeostigmaeus Fowler, 1907; Stereolepoides thompsoni Fowler, 1923

Species of fish

The giant grouper (Epinephelus lanceolatus), also known as the Queensland grouper (groper), brindle grouper or mottled-brown sea bass, is a species of marine ray-finned fish, a grouper from the subfamily Epinephelinae which is part of the family Serranidae, which also includes the anthias and sea basses. It has a wide Indo-Pacific distribution and is one of the largest extant species of bony fish.

== Taxonomy ==
The giant grouper was first formally described as Holocentras lanceolatus in 1790 by the German medical doctor and naturalist Marcus Elieser Bloch (1723–1799) with the type locality given as the East Indies.

Felipe Poey assigned the giant and goliath groupers (Epinephelus itajara and E. quinquefasciatus, which was then regarded as a synonym of E. itajara) to the genus Promicrops but in 1972 this was designated as a subgenus of Epinephelus. However, these species are still each other's closest relatives.

== Distribution ==
The giant grouper has a wide Indo-Pacific distribution, it is the most widely distributed species of grouper in the world. It occurs from the Red Sea and the eastern coasts of Africa as far south as Algoa Bay in South Africa and across the Indian Ocean into the Western Pacific Ocean as far east as the Pitcairn Islands and Hawaii. They occur as far north as southern Japan and as far south as Australia.

In Australia it is found from Rottnest Island in Western Australia north and east along the tropical coasts of Australia, including offshore reefs, and then south along the eastern coast to Woy Woy, New South Wales. It also occurs around Christmas Island and Cocos (Keeling) Islands and the Elizabeth and Middleton Reefs Marine National Park Reserve in the Tasman Sea. There have also been reports from the Younghusband Peninsula in South Australia and north eastern New Zealand. It is absent from the Persian Gulf but it is present off the coast of Pakistan and southern Oman.

It has been listed as a potential invasive species in the Bahamas but its presence in that region requires verification.

== Description ==
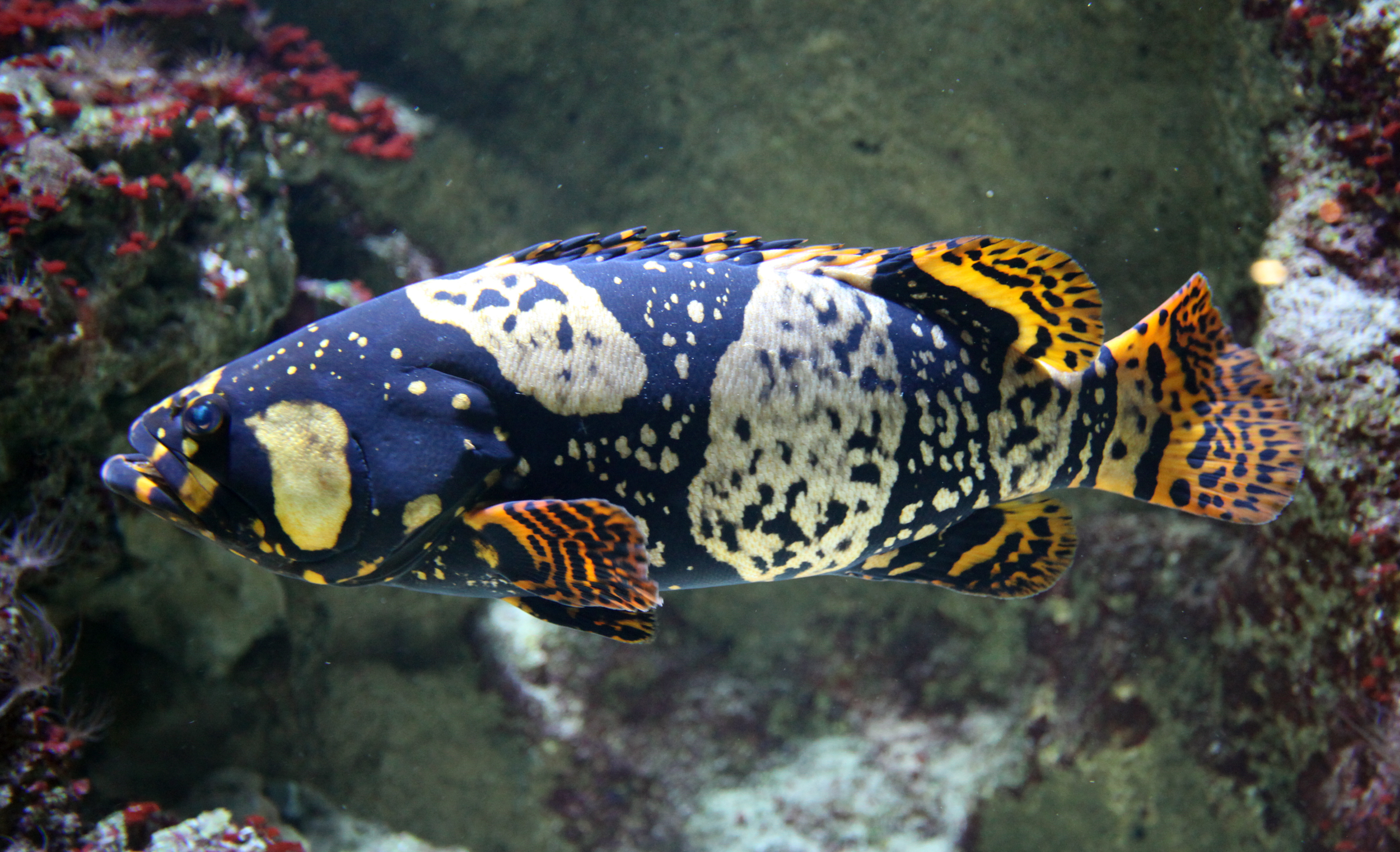
Juvenile coloration

The giant grouper can grow to huge size with the maximum recorded standard length being 270 centimetres (110 in), although they are more common around 180 centimetres (71 in), and a maximum published weight of 400 kilograms (880 lb).

The body is robust, and has a standard length equivalent to 2.4 to 3.4 times its depth. The dorsal profile of the head and the intraorbital area are convex. The preopercle has a rounded corner and a finely serrated margin. The gill cover has a convex upper margin. There are 11 spines and 14–16 soft rays in the dorsal fin while the anal fin has 3 spines and 8 soft rays. The caudal fin is slightly rounded. There are 54 to 62 scales in its lateral line.

In Kenya

Adults are grayish-brown in colour overlain with a mottled pattern and with darker fins. The small juveniles are yellow with wide, dark irregular bars and irregular dark spots on their fins.

== Habitat and biology ==
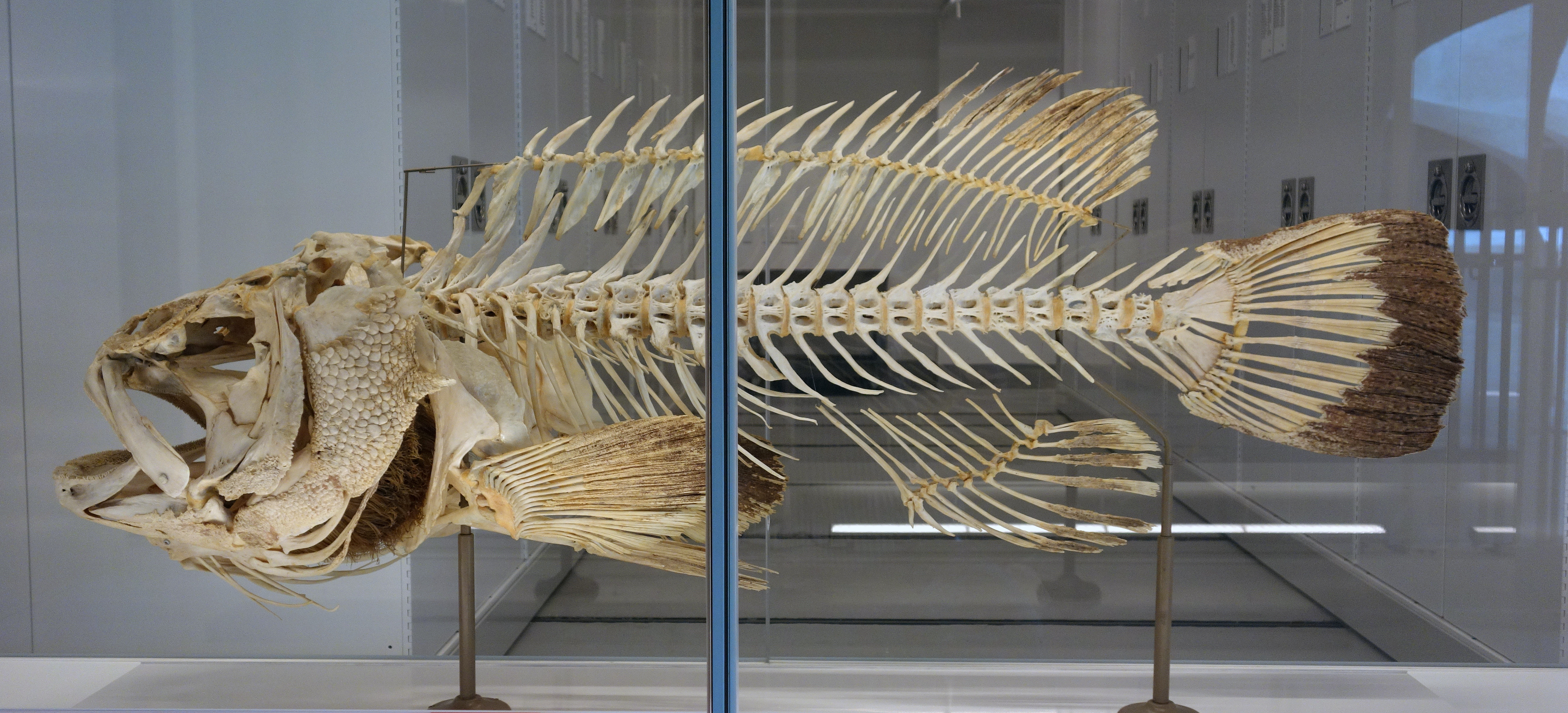
Skeleton, at the American Museum of Natural History

The giant grouper is a species of shallow water fish and can be found at depths of 1 to 100 metres (3.3 to 328.1 ft). It is associated with reefs and is the largest known bony fish found on reefs. Large specimens have been caught from shore and in harbours. They are found in caves and in wrecks while the secretive juveniles occur in reefs and are infrequently observed. The adults are mainly solitary and hold territories on the outer reef and in lagoons. They have also been caught in turbid water over silt or mud sea beds by prawn fishermen.

This species is normally solitary and long-lived. They are, however, curious and frequently approach divers closely. They are not generally considered dangerous to humans but divers are advised to treat large specimens with caution and not to hand feed them as there have been reports of large specimen attacking humans.

=== Diet ===
At the Georgia Aquarium

The giant grouper is an opportunistic ambush predator which feeds on a variety of fishes, as well as small sharks & batoids (rays), juvenile sea turtles, crustaceans and molluscs which are all swallowed whole. Fish which inhabit coral reefs and rocky areas favour spiny lobsters as prey; a 177-centimetre (70 in) specimen taken off Maui in Hawaii had a stomach content of two spiny lobsters and a number of crabs. Fish living in estuarine environments in South Africa were found to be feeding almost exclusively on the crab Scylla serrata.

=== Reproduction ===
Like most groupers, giant groupers are protogynous hermaphrodites. They spawn on a lunar cycle, with spawns lasting about 7 days. They are aggregative broadcast spawners, usually with several females per male. Studies in captive populations suggest that the dominant male and female begin the spawning event as nearly the only spawners for the first day or two, but other members of the aggregation fertilize more eggs as the event progresses, with even the most recently turned males fathering offspring. Giant groupers are diandric protogynous hermaphrodites, meaning that although some males develop from reproductively functional females other males start to produce sperm without ever having gone through a phase as a reproductive female.

== Use ==
At uShaka Marine World

The giant grouper is a highly valued food fish and is taken by both commercial and recreational fisheries. It is valued in Hong Kong as a live fish for the live reef food fish trade, especially smaller specimens, and its skin, gall bladder, and stomach, are used in Traditional Chinese Medicine. This species is cultured in mariculture and this practice is widespread but there is a restricted supply of juveniles, although hatcheries in Taiwan have produced captive bred juveniles, exporting some for to be grown on in other parts of South-East Asia.

=== Hulong hybrid grouper ===
In 2007, male giant groupers were crossed with female brown-marbled groupers (E. fuscoguttatus) through in-vitro fertilization in Malaysia to develop a hybrid grouper for commercial aquaculture. This hybrid is commonly called the Hulong grouper, Sabah giant grouper, or pearl gentian grouper. The flesh of the brown-marbled grouper has a taste that is more favourable than that of the giant grouper's, however, the latter species grows faster and is easier to culture because it is less sensitive to changes in environmental parameters. The resulting hybrid has a higher growth rate than both of its parents, and is also more disease resistant. The production of the hybrid grouper has subsequently spread; by 2015, 155,000 tons of the hybrid grouper were being produced each year, equivalent to $630 million USD. Three countries are responsible for an estimated 93% of global production, including China (65% of total production), Taiwan (17%) and Indonesia (11%).

==== Invasive risk ====
Hybrid (E. fuscoguttatus × lanceolatus), in Thailand

The hybrid grouper has been repeatedly and intentionally released into the wild. Additionally, fish farms often drain eggs and juvenile fish directly into the ocean when troubled by disease. Accidental escape also occur. As a result, the hybrid grouper now has a wide distribution in southeast Asian waters and poses a serious invasive risk in the wild. The hybrid is able to breed with itself as well as back-cross. The hybrid is typically commercially sold at weights of 500 to 1,000g, and the size record in captivity was a 12 year old male that weighed 32,000g. On the other hand, the hybrid grouper grows even faster in the wild than it does in aquaculture, and the largest recorded hybrid grouper caught in the wild weighed 39,800g.

== Cultural references ==
The first fish to undergo chemotherapy was Bubba, a giant grouper at the Shedd Aquarium in Chicago.
