= Kayavak =

Female beluga in captivity at the Shedd Aquarium, Illinois

- Species: Beluga whale (Delphinapterus leucas)
- Sex: Female
- Born: August 3, 1999; Shedd Aquarium, Chicago, Illinois
- Died: April 2025 (aged 25); Shedd Aquarium, Chicago, Illinois
- Known for: Being hand-raised after the death of her mother
- Weight: 1400 lb (640 kg)

Kayavak (August 3, 1999–April 2025) was a female beluga whale that resided at the Shedd Aquarium in downtown Chicago. She was one of the first cetaceans to be raised by human caretakers following the death of her mother, Immiayuk, when Kayavak was four months old.

== Early life ==
Kayavak was born on August 3, 1999, to a beluga named Immiayuk at the Shedd Aquarium in Chicago. She was the third calf born at the aquarium and the first to survive to adulthood. As part of a Shedd tradition, she was given an Inuit name. "Kayavak" means "singing game producing soft echoes".

== Death of her mother ==
Immiayuk died suddenly on December 26, 1999. The cause of death was erysipelas, a rare bacterial infection found in the fish that the whales eat. Aquarium staff feared that Kayavak would soon die without her mother. Several options were considered for saving her life. It was decided using an artificial milk formula was not a viable option, as no such formula had been developed yet for belugas (the first such substitute was used for the first time in July 2010 when a beluga calf at SeaWorld San Antonio was rejected by her mother). They also chose not to place her with another adult female beluga, Puiji, who had lost her own calf four months prior. There was doubt she would bond with the calf, or be able to produce milk again. Shedd Aquarium staff determined that the most viable option was to immediately begin feeding Kayavak whole fish, weaning her off of milk entirely at the age of four months. Trainers hand-fed her with fish every three hours, although the beluga is not usually weaned for a year.

== Later life ==
As Kayavak grew older, she was gradually introduced to the aquarium's other belugas. Before her mother's death, she had been housed with other adult females Naya and Mauyak, but had been kept isolated since Immiayuk died. Beginning a year after her mother's death, Kayavak was introduced to Puiji and Naya, spending a few hours at a time with one of them before they would become aggressive towards her. Later on, she was introduced to Mauyak, and her calf Qannik, who was born a year after Kayavak. Kayavak befriended Qannik, but his mother was extremely protective of him and would chase Kayavak away.

When Kayavak was three years old, she was introduced to the entire group of belugas at Shedd. All were initially aggressive towards her, and she was the lowest ranking animal in the group's social hierarchy. Eventually, she settled into the group, becoming particularly close with Qannik. The two were separated in 2007 when Qannik was moved to the Point Defiance Zoo and Aquarium.

Kayavak fell ill with an unspecified abdominal issue in early April of 2025. Despite numerous interventions, including the first known CT scan and anesthesia of an adult beluga whale, Kayavak's condition was deemed unrecoverable and she was euthanized at the age of 25.

== See also ==
- List of individual cetaceans
