= Bubba (fish) =

Giant grouper that underwent chemotherapy

- Species: Giant grouper
- Born: c. 1982
- Died: August 22, 2006 (aged 23–24)
- Known for: First fish to undergo chemotherapy
- Residence: Shedd Aquarium

Bubba (c. 1982 – August 22, 2006) was a giant grouper (Queensland grouper) that resided at the Shedd Aquarium in Chicago, Illinois. Bubba is believed to be the first fish to undergo chemotherapy. He was often nicknamed "The Super Grouper".

== History ==
Bubba was left in a bucket at the aquarium's doorstep in 1987 by an anonymous donor with a note asking for him to get a good home; at the time, he was a female and about 25 cm (10 in) long. Bubba changed sex to male (being a protogynous hermaphrodite) in the mid-1990s and eventually grew to 154 lb while living in the aquarium's "Wild Reef" shark exhibit. Aquarium staff started referring to him as Bubba because of his hulking appearance and manner.

In 2001, Bubba developed an unusual growth on his forehead, which was eventually diagnosed to be malignant; the aquarium called in veterinarians to remove the growth surgically and treat Bubba with chemotherapy that year, and again in 2003, when it regrew.

Shedd officials stated that Bubba was popular with cancer survivors, especially children, and was a favorite of visitors. The oncology department of Hope Children's Hospital in Oak Lawn, Illinois, recognized Bubba with a tile in the ward.

Bubba died on August 22, 2006, presumably due to problems with his health that were related to his old age and medical history.
