= Bloodshed =

Bloodshed may refer to:

- Bloodshed (comics), a character in the Marvel Universe
- Bloodshed (album), a 2004 compilation album by Krisiun
- "Bloodshed" (song), a 2013 song by Soulfly
- "Bloodshed" (song), a 2017 song by Denzel Curry
- Bloodshed (band), a Christian hardcore band
- Blood Shed (2014 film), a horror film featuring Bai Ling
- Bloodshed Software, the developers of Dev-C++
- Bloodshed, member of the New York rap group Children of the Corn

== See also ==
- Violence
