= Sheed (surname) =

Sheed is a surname. Notable people with the surname include:

- Dom Sheed (born 1995), Australian rules footballer
- Frank Sheed (1897–1981), Australian Catholic apologist
- Jordan Sheed (born 1982), New Zealand cricketer
- Wilfrid Sheed (1930–2011), English-born American novelist
