= Shedd Aquarium =

Aquarium in Chicago, Illinois, United States

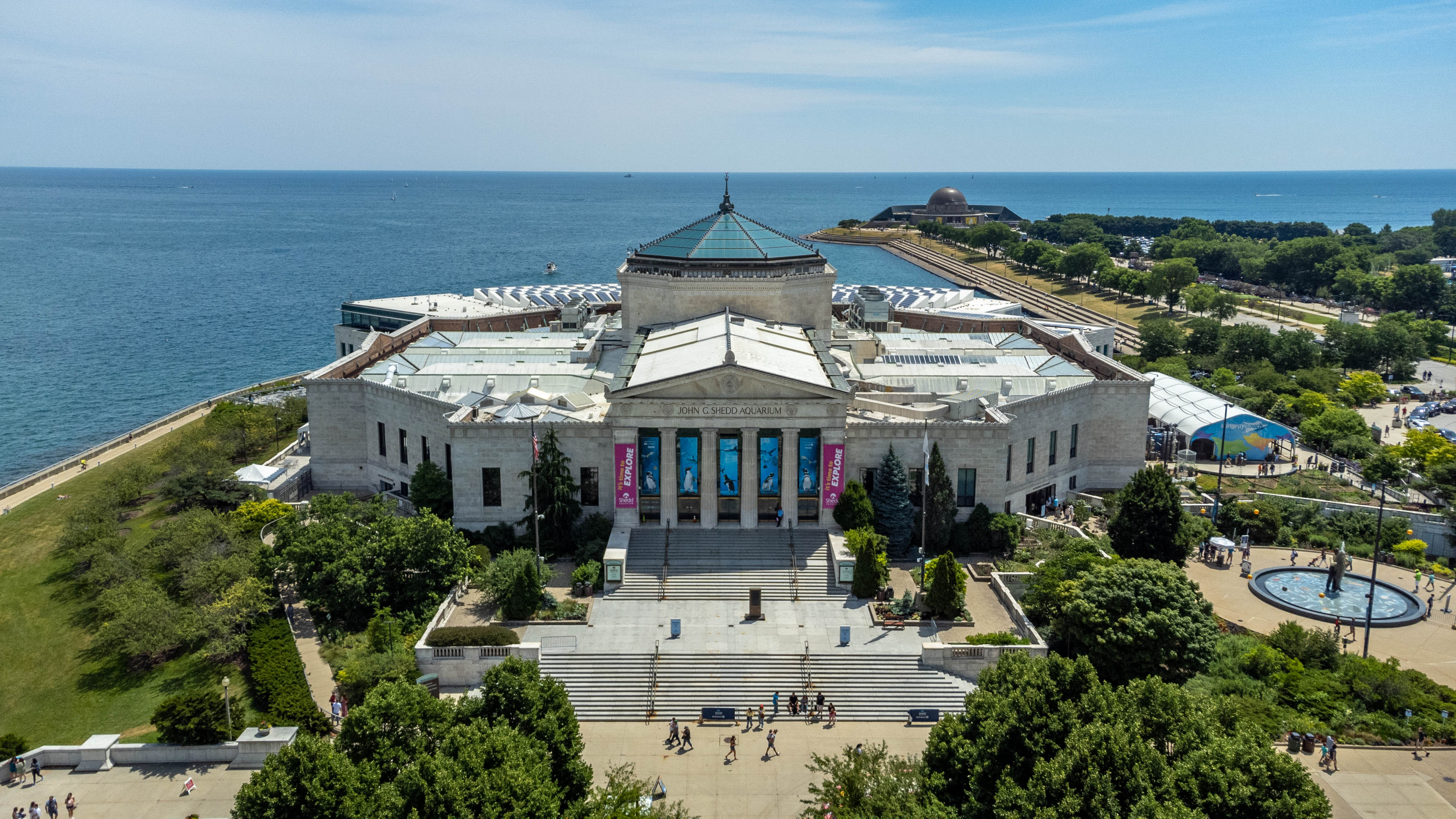
- The Aquarium in 2022
- Interactive map of Shedd Aquarium
- Date opened: May 30, 1930; 96 years ago
- Location: 1200 South Lake Shore Drive; Chicago, Illinois, United States
- No. of animals: 32,000
- No. of species: 1,500
- Total volume of tanks: 5 million US gallons (19,000 m^{3})
- Annual visitors: 2.02 million
- Memberships: AZA, WAZA
- Major exhibits: Amazon Rising, Wonder of Water, Abbott Oceanarium, Polar Play Zone, Waters of the World, Wild Reef
- Public transit: Metra ME; South Shore Line at Museum Campus/11th Street; Roosevelt; Red Orange Green
- Website: www.sheddaquarium.org
- Shedd Aquarium
- U.S. National Register of Historic Places
- U.S. National Historic Landmark
- Built: 1929
- Architect: Graham, Anderson, Probst & White
- NRHP reference No.: 87000820

Significant dates
- Added to NRHP: February 27, 1987
- Designated NHL: February 27, 1987

Shedd Aquarium (formally the John G. Shedd Aquarium) is a public aquarium in Chicago, Illinois, United States. It is one of the oldest continually operating non-governmental aquariums in the U.S.

Opened on May 30, 1930, the 5 million US gal (19,000,000 L; 4,200,000 imp gal) aquarium holds about 32,000 animals. It is the fourth largest aquarium in the Western Hemisphere (after L'Oceanogràfic, the Georgia Aquarium and The Seas at Epcot) and the 11th-largest aquarium in the world.

The Shedd Aquarium is a highly ranked world aquarium and at one time was the largest indoor facility in the world. It is the first inland aquarium with a permanent saltwater fish collection. The aquarium is located along Lake Michigan in the city's Museum Campus, which also includes other highly ranked institutions such as Adler Planetarium and the Field Museum of Natural History.

In 2015, the Shedd Aquarium had 2.02 million visitors. It was the most visited aquarium in the Western Hemisphere in 2005, and in 2007, became the most visited cultural institution in Chicago. The aquarium contains 1,500 species, including fish, marine mammals, birds, snakes, amphibians, and insects. The aquarium received awards for "best exhibit" from the Association of Zoos and Aquariums (AZA) for Seahorse Symphony in 1999, Amazon Rising in 2001, and Wild Reef in 2004. It was designated a National Historic Landmark in 1987.

== History ==
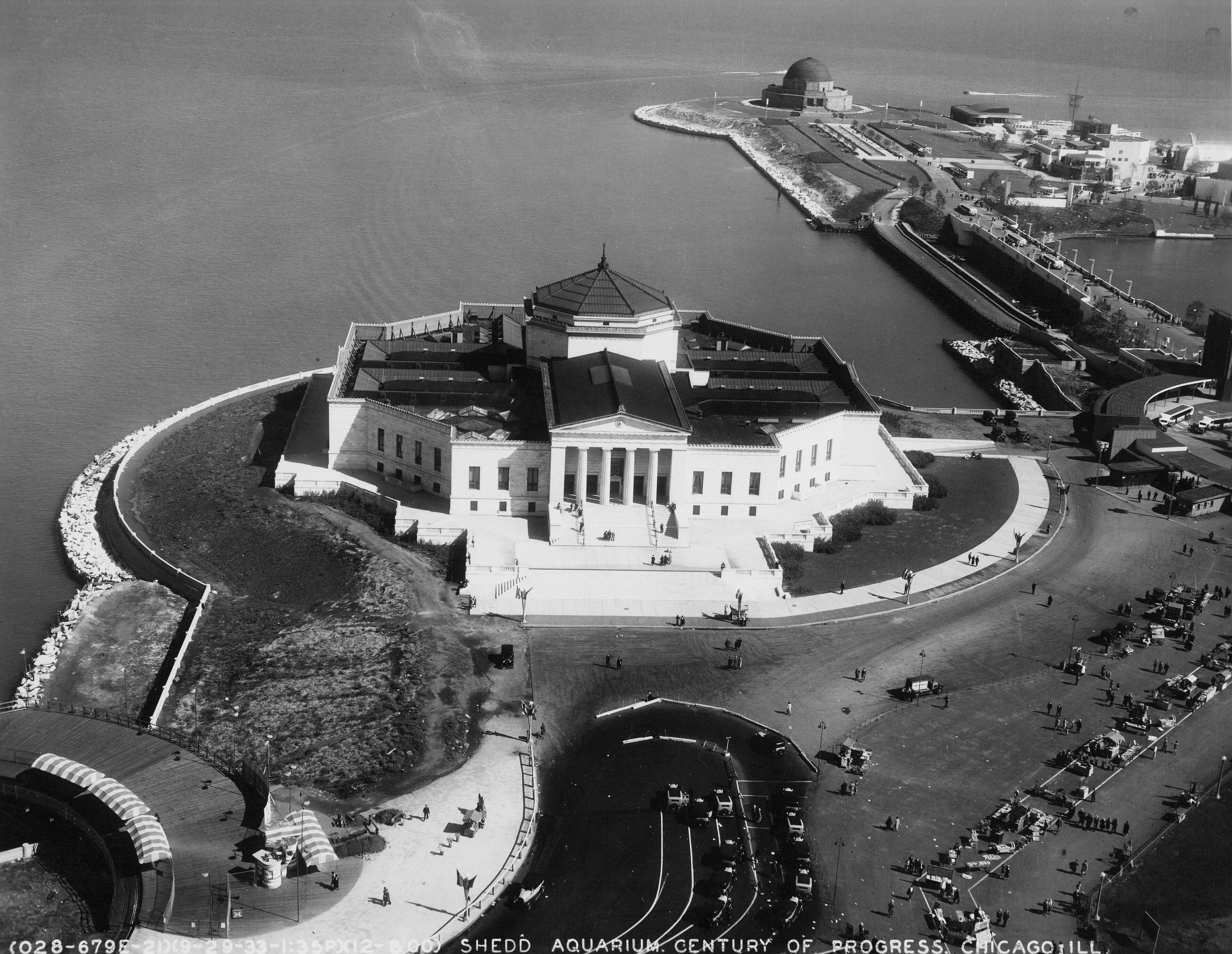
Aquarium in 1934 during the Century of Progress world fair.

Shedd Aquarium was the gift of retail leader John G. Shedd, a protégé of Marshall Field (benefactor of the adjacent Field Museum), to the city of Chicago. Although Shedd only lived long enough to see the architect's first drawings for the aquarium, his widow, Mary R. Shedd, cut the ribbon at the official opening ceremony.

The aquarium cost $3 million to build (equivalent to $57.8 million in 2025), and initially included 132 exhibit tanks. Groundbreaking took place on November 2, 1927, and construction was completed on December 19, 1929; the first exhibits opened on May 30, 1930. As one of the first inland aquariums in the world, the Shedd had to rely on a custom-made railroad car, the Nautilus, for the transport of fish and seawater. The Nautilus lasted until 1959.

In 1930, 20 railroad tank cars made eight round trips between Key West and Chicago to transport 1 million US gallons (3,800,000 L) of seawater for the Shedd's saltwater exhibits. In 1933, Chicago hosted its second world's fair, the Century of Progress. The Aquarium was located immediately north of the fairgrounds, and the museum gained exposure to a large international crowd.

In 1971, Shedd Aquarium added one of its most popular exhibits, a 90,000-US-gallon (340,000 L) exhibit reproducing a Caribbean coral reef. That same year, the aquarium acquired its first crewed research vessel, a 75-foot (23 m) boat for exploring the Caribbean, to conduct field research and collect specimens. In 1985, this boat was replaced with the aquarium's current vessel, the Coral Reef II. In 1987, Shedd Aquarium was placed on the National Register of Historic Places.

John Shedd's grandson, John Shedd Reed, who had served as president of Atchison, Topeka and Santa Fe Railroad from 1967 to 1986, was president of the aquarium's board from 1984 until 1994, and was a life trustee until his death in 2008. Ted A. Beattie served as president and CEO of the aquarium from 1994 until his retirement in 2016. Bridget C. Coughlin assumed duties as president and CEO of the company in the Spring of 2016.

=== Architecture ===
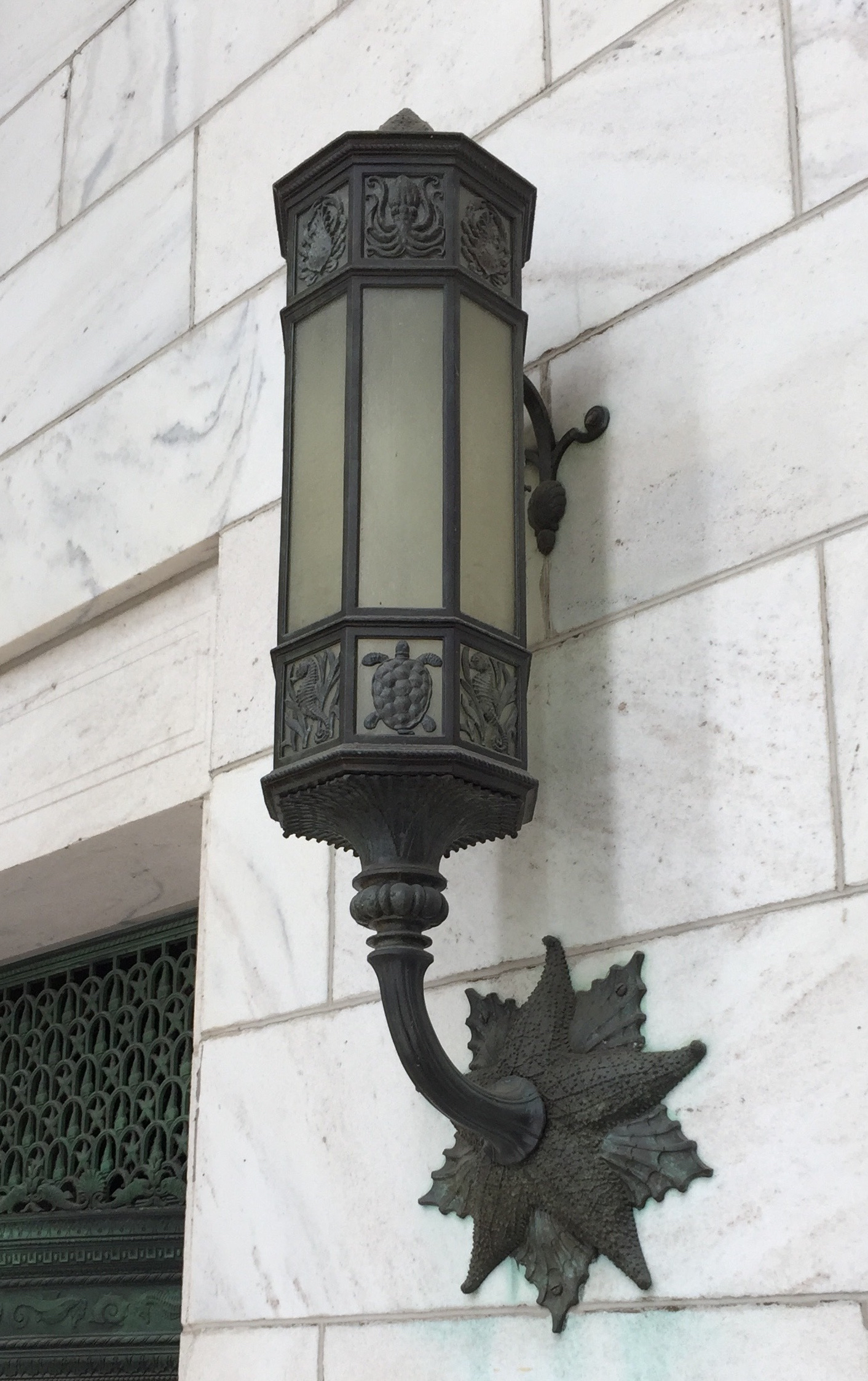
Lamp in the main entrance depicting various sea creatures

Shedd Aquarium is notable for its architecture. The basic design, by architectural firm Graham, Anderson, Probst & White, is taken from classical Greek architecture, more specifically Beaux Arts, to match the other structures of the Museum Campus. The central aquarium building is octagonal, fronted by Doric columns and a formal staircase and topped by a dome. Aquatic motifs are worked in at every opportunity; tortoise shells, dolphins, octopuses, waves, and even the Trident of Poseidon can be found all over the aquarium's exterior and interior.

Improving upon its predecessor inland aquarium, the Belle Isle Aquarium in Detroit, extensive use was made of designs by Mary Chase Perry Stratton, incorporating her custom-made Pewabic Pottery tile. The Oceanarium is done in a more modern style representing the Pacific Northwest, but one that blends with the older part of the building. "Whale Harbor", the Oceanarium's 2-million-US-gallon (7,600,000 L) main tank, is backed by a wall of windows that look out onto Lake Michigan.

== Exhibits and presentations ==
There are several permanent exhibits at Shedd: Waters of the World, Wonder of Water, Amazon Rising, Wild Reef, and the Abbott Oceanarium.

=== Waters of the World ===
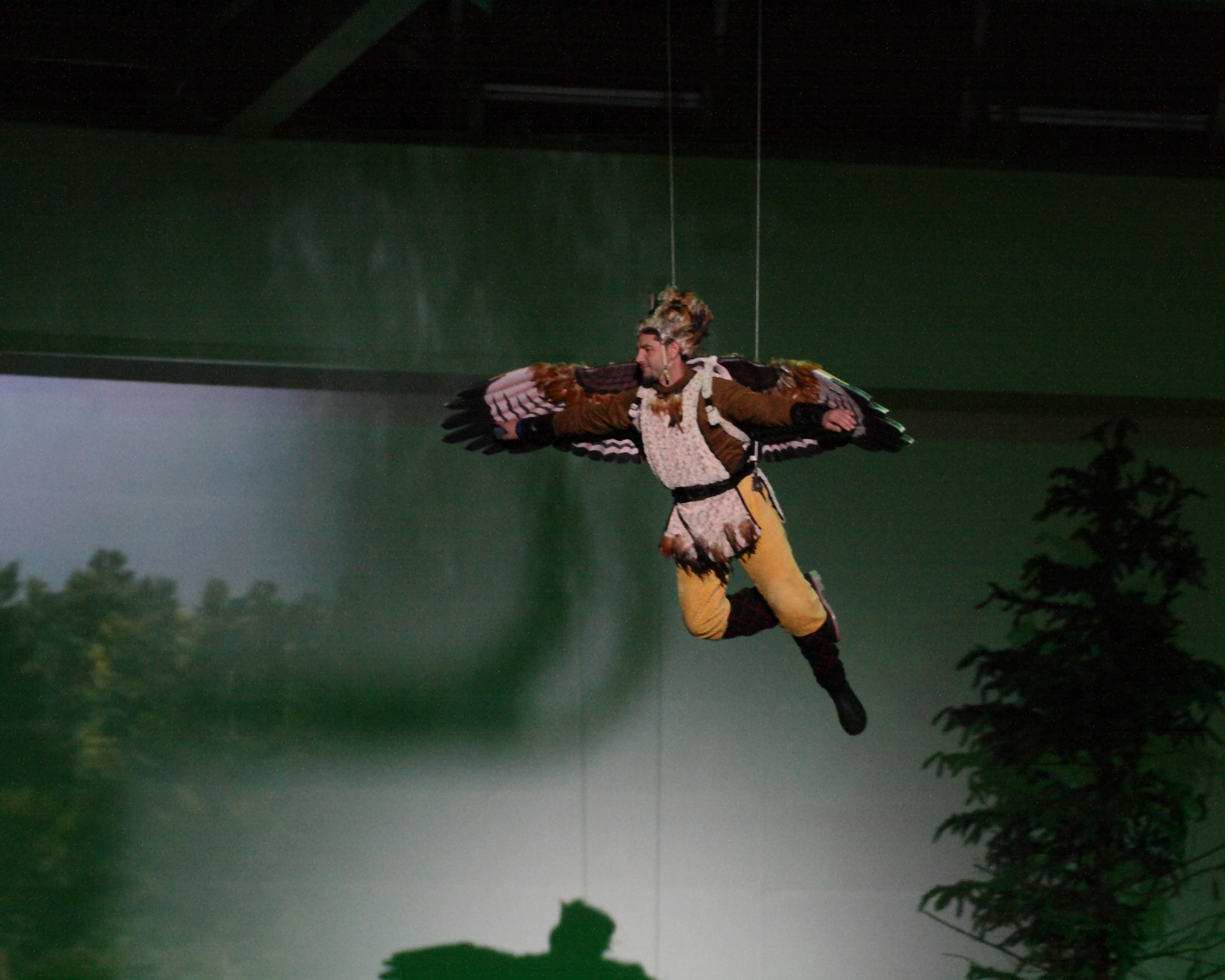

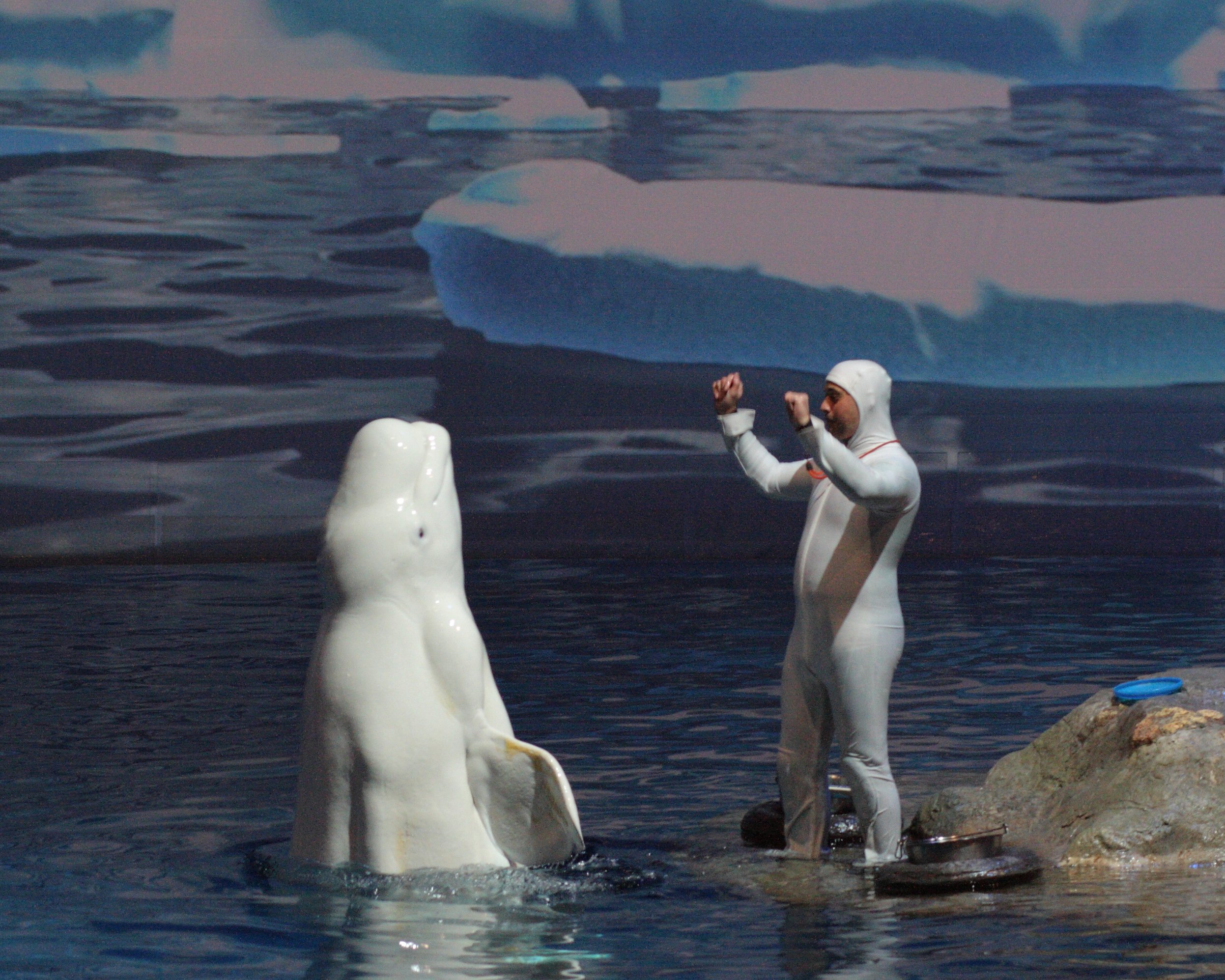
Aquatic show at the aquarium.

The oldest galleries in the aquarium feature exhibits on oceans, rivers, islands and lakes, and Chicago's own local waters. Species on exhibit include American bullfrog, a giant Pacific octopus, American alligator, lake sturgeon, starfish, lined seahorses, and alligator snapping turtle.

=== Wonder of Water ===
The original Caribbean Reef exhibit was built in 1971, on the site of the aquarium's very first exhibit, the Tropical Pool. A feature of this exhibit is a diver that interacts with the animals while talking with the people. A part of the exhibit is a 90,000-US-gallon (340,000 L) circular tank that allows for maximum walk-around viewing. It was one of the first habitats to display schooling fish. It is also home to the rescued green sea turtle, Nickel, as well as Atlantic tarpons, cownose rays, redband parrotfish, Bonnethead sharks, a Green moray eel, and many more species. The exhibit is near the center of the first floor. It is adjacent to Amazon Rising, Waters of the World, and Wild Reef. The Caribbean Reef tank was closed in 2023 and will eventually be replaced with the Caribbean Reef tunnel connecting the two main sections of the aquarium building, while two new tanks replaced the original Caribbean Reef tank. Wonder of Water opened in December 2024.

=== Amazon Rising ===
The Amazon Rising exhibit is an 8,600-square-foot (800 m^{2}) walkthrough flooded forest recreation of the Amazon River and the surrounding jungle. This exhibit contains 250 different species, and its highest water level is 6 feet (1.8 m). Species from this area on exhibit include a green anaconda, red-bellied piranhas, electric eels, freshwater stingrays, dwarf caimans, caiman lizards, wattled jacanas, yellow-spotted river turtles, red-footed tortoises, yellow-footed tortoises, mata matas, Arapaimas, different species of South American birds, fish, and frogs, and many more.

=== Wild Reef ===
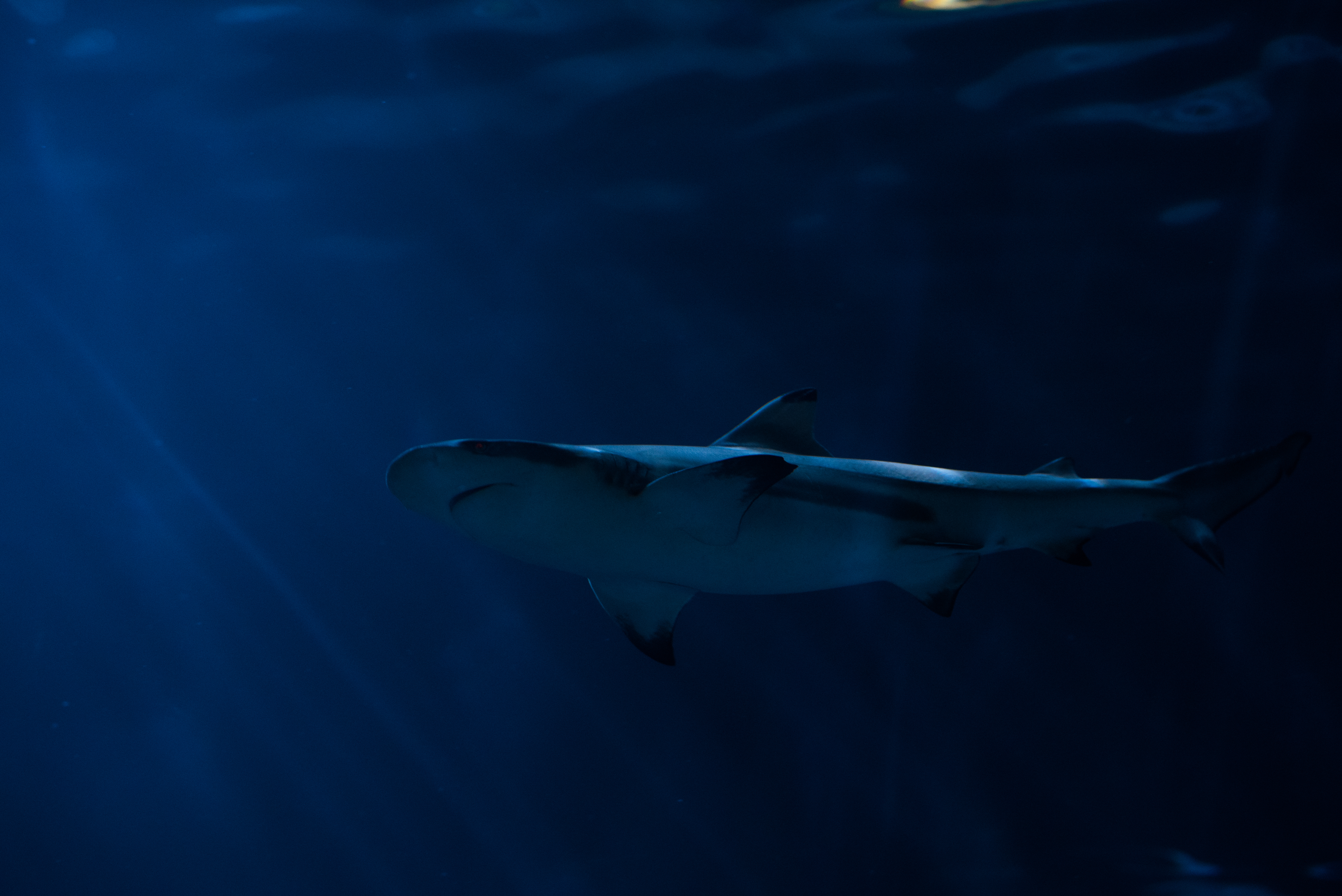
Shark in the Wild Reef exhibit.

In 2003, Shedd opened Wild Reef, a permanent exhibit located two levels below the main building. The exhibit contains a total of 525,000 US gallons (1,990,000 L) and recreates a Philippine coral reef on the Apo Island marine reserve, complete with living coral, multiple species of fish and rays such as the Humphead wrasse, Kuhl's stingray, yellow and blueback fusilier, Queensland grouper, Laced moray, and a collection of several endangered sharks such as the sandbar, zebra, blacktip reef sharks, a white-spotted guitarfish named Lucille who died in May 2024, Spotted wobbegongs, Japanese wobbegongs and the critically endangered Bowmouth guitarfish.

The main draw of this attraction is a 400,000-US-gallon (1,500,000 L) shark tank with 12-foot (3.7 m) high curved windows, allowing visitors a diver's-eye view. The Wild Reef exhibit also features a saltwater tank display area where coral is propagated and grown for conservation purposes.

=== Oceanarium ===
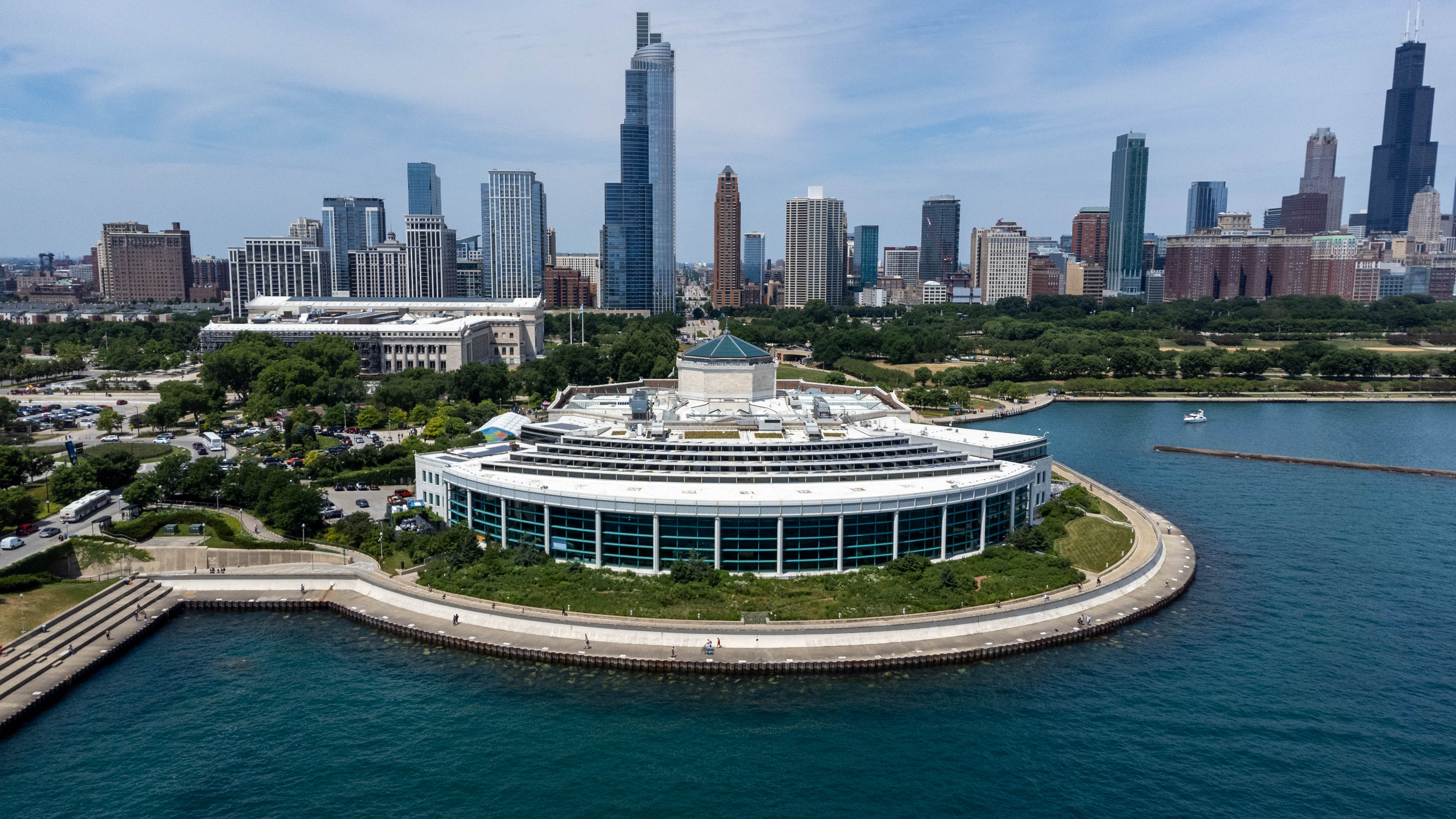
The Abbott Oceanarium exterior

In 1991, Shedd Aquarium opened the Oceanarium (known since 2010 as the Abbott Oceanarium), a large addition to the aquarium that features marine mammals, including Pacific white-sided dolphins, beluga whales, sea otters and California sea lions, on the right side of the stairway that is next to the sea lions is an open estuary tank for several cuttlefish and by the sea otter exhibit, is a large natural looking touch tank for tide pool creatures like crabs, sea cucumbers and sea anemones. The lower level of the Oceanarium allows underwater viewing of the beluga whales and the dolphins. It holds 3 million US gallons (11,000,000 L) in total; the largest single tank is the 2-million-US-gallon (7,600,000 L) "Whale Harbour".

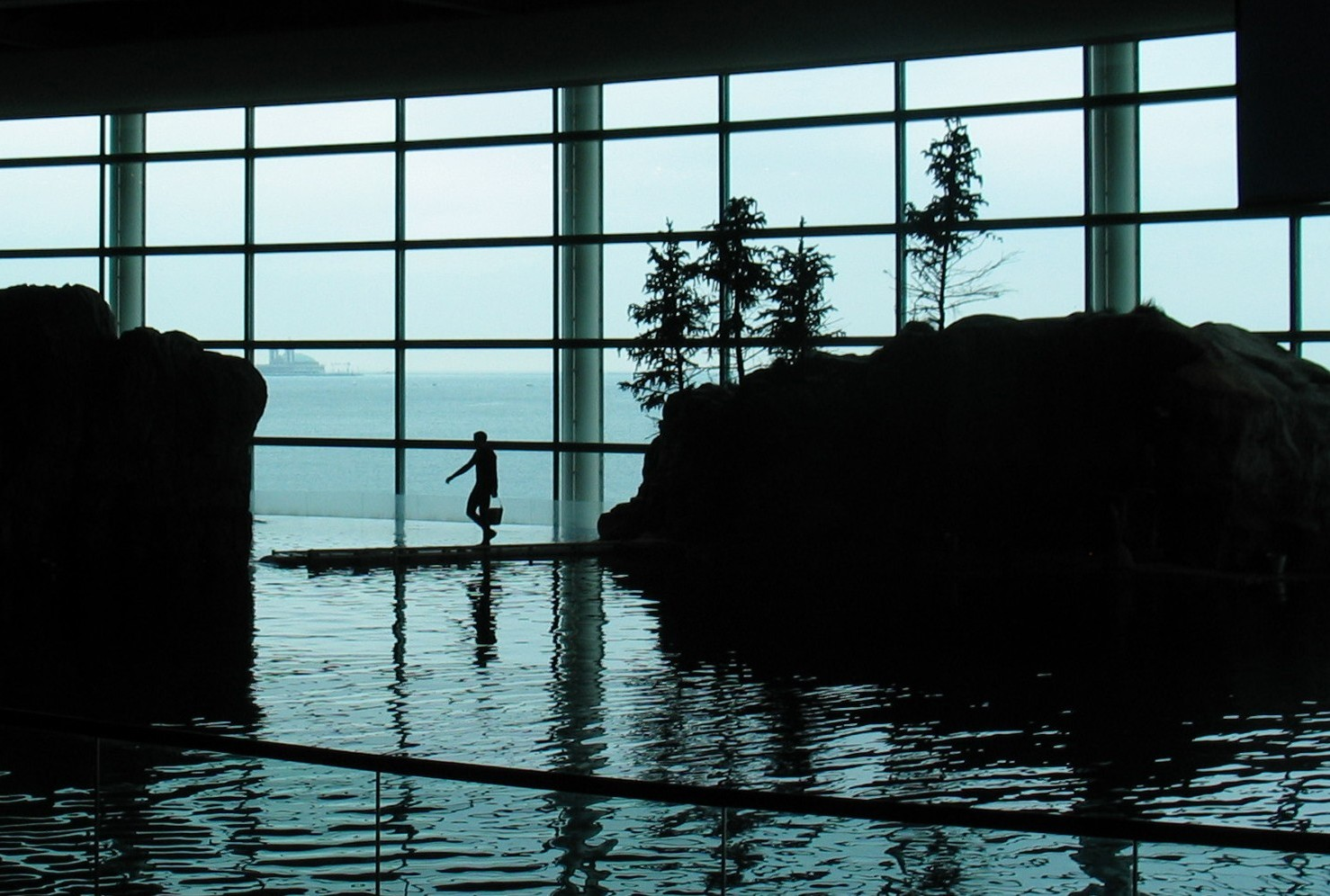
Preparing for a show in the Oceanarium, with Lake Michigan in the background

The Oceanarium is the largest indoor marine mammal facility in the world. The Oceanarium also houses a 1,000-seat amphitheater which presents an educational marine mammal show. Several of the sea otters that lived in the aquarium in the past were rescued from the Exxon Valdez oil spill in 1989. In the fall of 2008, Shedd's Oceanarium was closed for preventive sealing as well as administrative upgrades. The animals in the exhibit area were temporarily moved to other zoos and aquariums until the exhibit reopened in May 2009.

=== Polar Play Zone ===
The exhibit is an interactive play area for children and contains an underwater viewing area of the beluga whales, Pacific white-sided dolphins and sea otters. The exhibit also includes Southern rockhopper penguins and magellanic penguins, as well as 5 circular tanks for moon jellyfish and starfishes that are by an interactive submarine model. There is also a starfish touch pool.

=== Stingray Touch ===
Located on the aquarium's South Terrace, this exhibit allows guests to touch cownose rays as they swim around their 20,000 US gallons (76,000 L) outdoor exhibit and is open seasonally from May through October.

=== Plankton Revealed ===
The Plankton Revealed exhibit opened in July 2023 focuses on the importance of plankton and features flamboyant cuttlefish, white-spotted jellyfish, brine shrimp and other small animals. This interactive exhibit is the aquarium's first to be fully bilingual, featuring Spanish translations.

=== 4D Theater ===
The 4D Theater opened in 2009 as part of the renovation of the Abbott Oceanarium. The 4D experience includes a 3D film with interactive seats, high-tech audio and interactive elements like scents and bubbles. Films shown have included SpongeBob SquarePants 4-D, Ice Age: Dawn of the Dinosaurs, and The Polar Express (seasonal).

== Previous special exhibits ==
=== Jellies ===
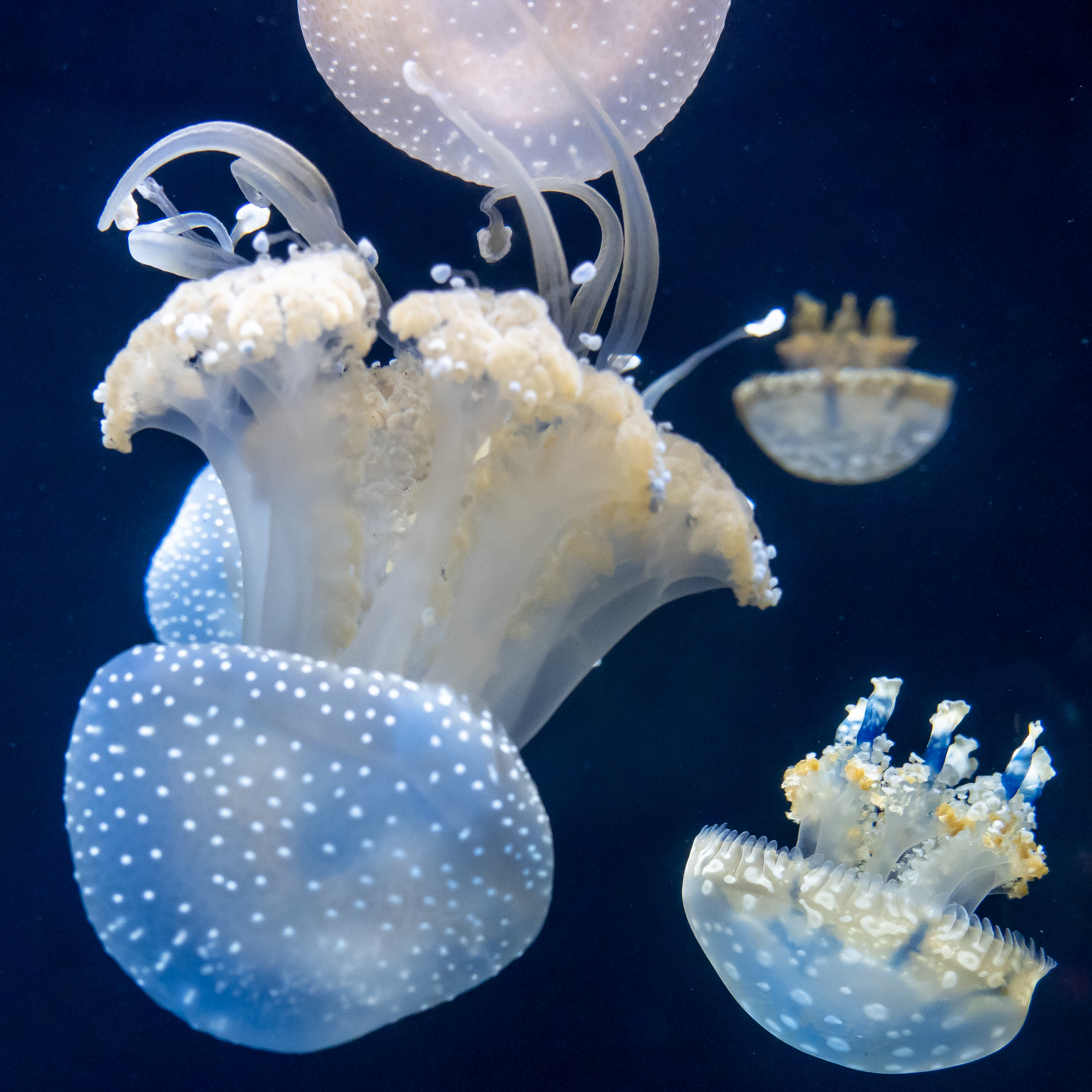
Although the themed exhibit was temporary, jellyfish continue to be shown at the aquarium.

The "jellies" exhibit opened in April 2011, focusing on jellyfish, and the misconceptions surrounding them. It featured at least 10 species of jellyfish, including moon jellyfish, egg-yolk jellyfish, purple-striped jelly, Atlantic sea nettle, jelly blubber and upside-down jellyfish. The exhibit closed in 2015.

=== Underwater Beauty ===
This exhibit opened on May 25, 2018, and focused on the visual beauty of sea life, with sections called "Color", "Patterns", and "Rhythms." The exhibit featured 100 different species of fish and invertebrate, displayed to accent their visual qualities, including the ribbon eel, lagoon jelly, flower hat jelly, peacock mantis shrimp, Weedy seadragon and longnose hawkfish. The exhibit closed on April 17, 2023.

=== Amphibians ===
The amphibian exhibit opened on May 15, 2015, and ran through January 1, 2018. It featured 40 different species of amphibians, including the gray tree frog, poison dart frog, fire-bellied toad, emperor newt, axolotl, tiger salamander, spring peeper, Japanese giant salamander, cane toad, and the marbled salamander.

=== Seahorse Symphony ===
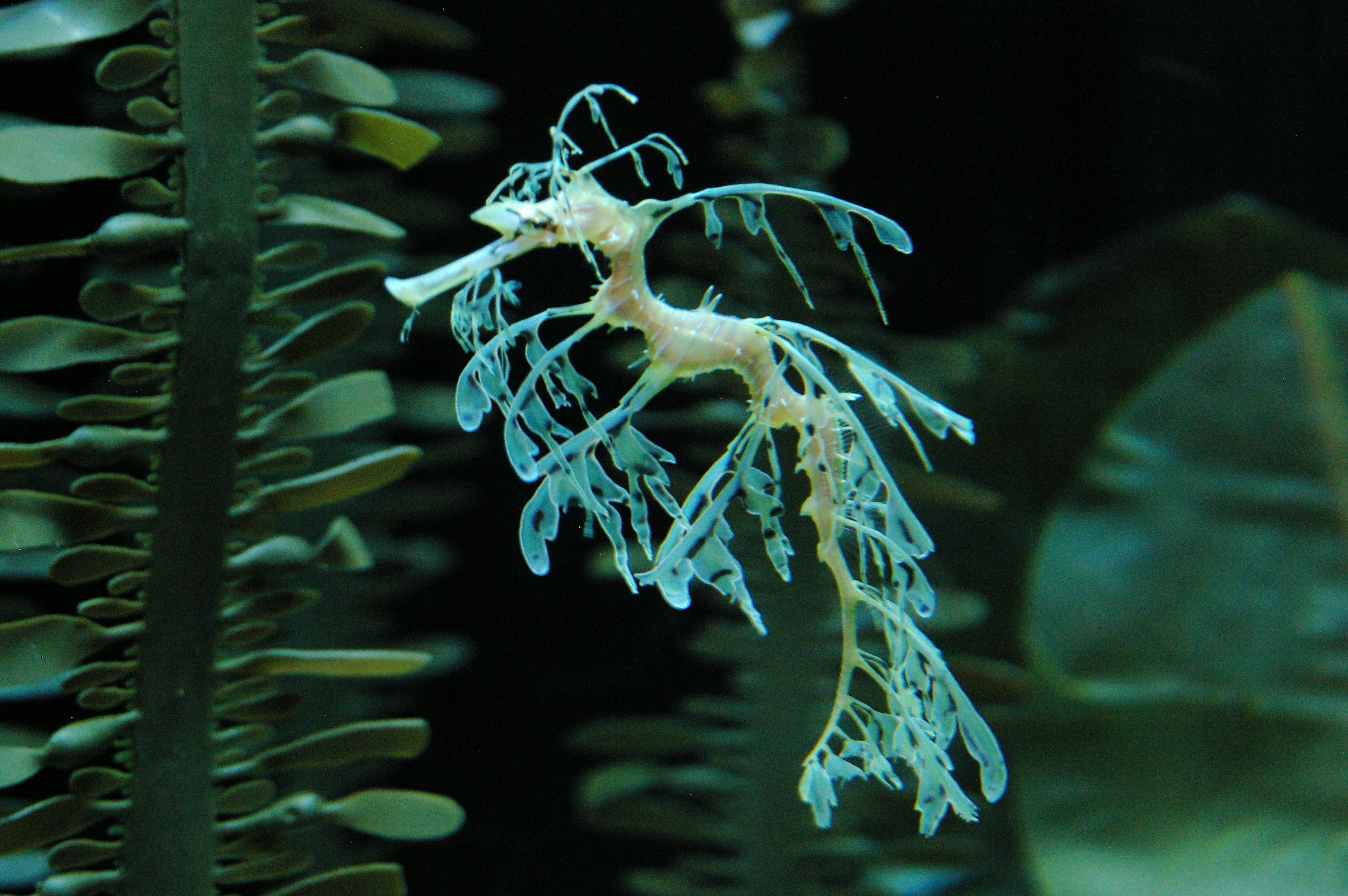
Leafy seadragon was one of the featured species during the Seahorse Symphony and continues to be popular at the aquarium.

The Seahorse Symphony exhibit opened in 1998 and ran through 2003. It featured trumpetfish, snipefish, shrimpfish, leafy seadragon, banded pipefish, seahorse, and the weedy seadragon.

=== Crabs! ===
Crabs! opened on May 17, 2005, as part of the Shedd Aquarium's 75th anniversary celebration. Until its closure on January 8, 2006, it was the largest exhibition of crabs in the United States.

=== Lizards and the Komodo King ===
From 2006 to 2008, this exhibit featured over 25 species of reptiles, including a Komodo dragon, green tree monitors, Gila monsters, caiman lizards, geckos, and a crocodile monitor.

== Animals on exhibit, past and present ==
=== Australian Lungfish ===
Granddad

Walter Chute, the aquarium's director from 1928 to 1964, wanted rare fish to attract the 10 million tourists expected to visit Chicago for the exposition in 1933. Granddad, an Australian lungfish, arrived at the Shedd in 1933, along with his mate, from Sydney during the Century of Progress world exposition. During the expo's run, they attracted about 4.5 million visitors.

At Granddad's death in 2017, he was claimed by the aquarium to be the oldest fish in any aquarium in the world. He was 109 years old; he weighed 25 pounds (11 kg) and was 4 feet (1.2 m) in length. His normal behavior was to lay like a sunken log on the bottom of his habitat.

=== Beluga whales ===
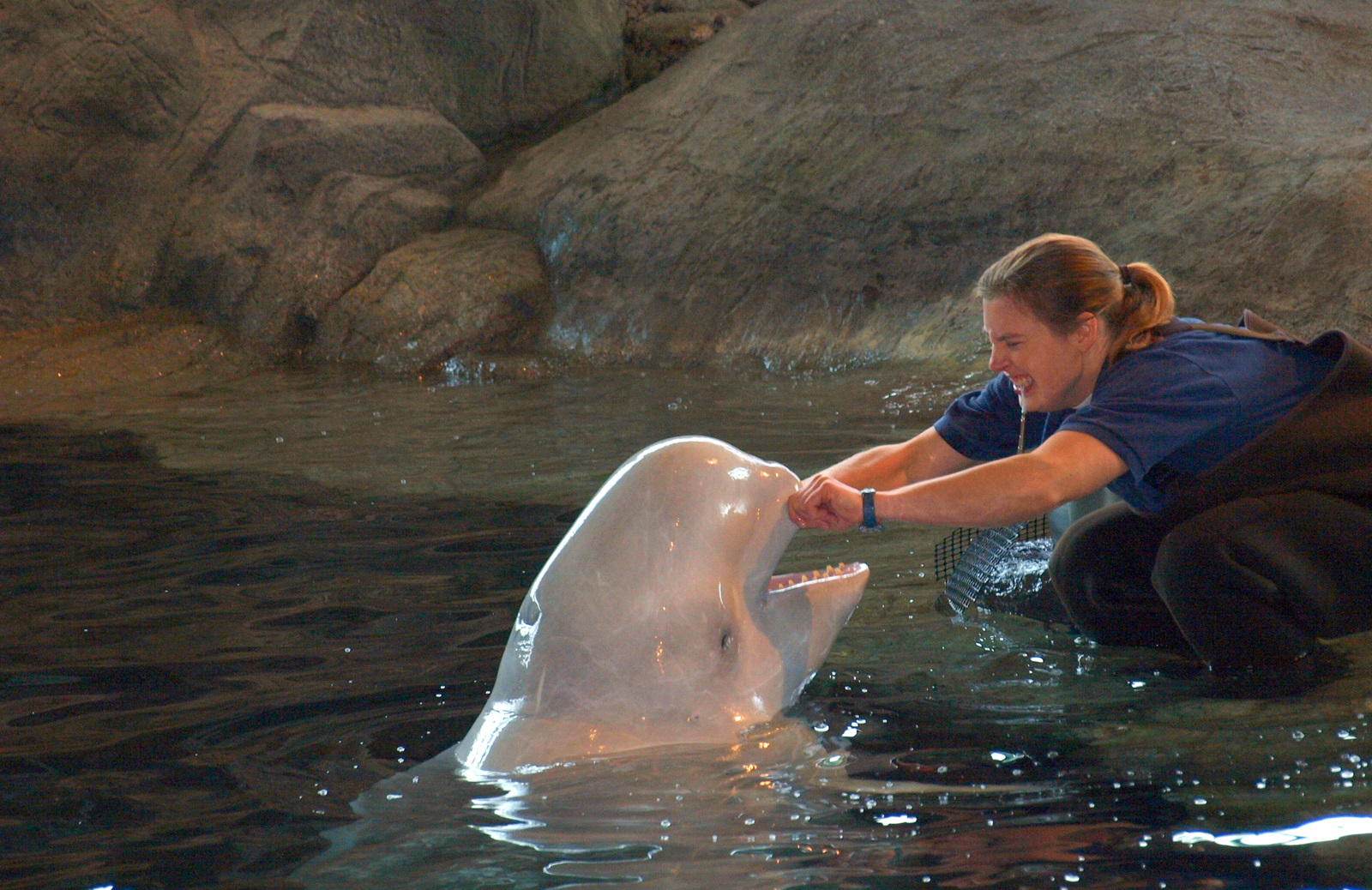
Beluga whale with trainer.

The Shedd Aquarium maintains a population of beluga whales in the Abbott Oceanarium. In 2026, the aquarium received ten belugas from the closed Marineland of Canada in Niagara Falls, Ontario, as part of an international effort to relocate the park's remaining captive whales.

The first four Marineland belugas, Acadia, Osiris, Sierra and Lillooet, arrived at Shedd on July 21, 2026. All four were female and had existing social bonds at Marineland, leading the aquariums involved in the relocation to move them together. Four more females, Caspian, Peekachu, Secord and Rain, arrived on August 13.

Peekachu, a 23-year-old female, died at Shedd on August 25, less than two weeks after her arrival. She had not been consistently eating her full diet, and blood tests indicated that she was dehydrated. She died suddenly while receiving medication and fluids, and a necropsy was undertaken to determine the cause of death.

The final two Marineland belugas assigned to Shedd, seven-year-old Gimli and eight-year-old Yukon, both males, arrived on the morning of September 1, 2026.

Four of the Marineland belugas, Peekachu, Rain, Osiris, and Caspian, died shortly after their arrival at the Shedd Aquarium. Necrospy results from Peekachu, Rain, and Osiris showed signs of chronic health issues in all three whales. Peekachu was found to have intestinal disease and hypertension; Rain exhibited signs of severe chronic inflammation to her small intestine, liver, and airways; and preliminary necropsy results from Osiris revealed chronic liver disease.

The surviving Marineland belugas at Shedd are Acadia, Sierra, Lillooet, Secord, Gimli, and Yukon.

Mauyak, Qannik, Miki, Kimalu, Annik: In 2000, Mauyak gave birth to Qannik, who was sent to Point Defiance Zoo in Tacoma where he died in 2009. On August 16, 2007, Mauyak gave birth yet again to a male calf named Miki, the Inuit word for ″small″ bringing the total number of successful beluga calf births at the aquarium to four since 1999. Miki has been moved to the Mystic Aquarium in 2016. On August 27, 2012, Mauyak gave birth to a female calf, Kimalu. On July 3, 2019, Mauyak gave birth to a male calf, Annik, bringing the total number of belugas at Shedd to eight. Mauyak died on Saturday, November 12, 2022.

Immiayuk, Kayavak: Kayavak is one of the most famous residents of the Oceanarium. The whale became an orphan at only nearly five months old after her mother, Immiayuk, died. Trainers fed Kayavak fish, cared for her day and night, taught her how to "be a whale", and she thrived to be a healthy adult. Kayavak died in April 2025.

Puiji, Bella, and Nunavik: In 2006, the beluga whale Puiji gave birth to a female calf, later named Bella. On December 14, 2009, she gave birth to a 162-pound, five-foot, four-inch male calf. Although it was a difficult birth, the calf survived and debuted to the public on Sunday, January 24, 2010. He has since been named "Nunavik" meaning "friendly, beautiful, and wild". Nunavik currently lives at the Georgia Aquarium as of 2016. Puiji died on Wednesday, October 26, 2011, following a seizure after having been undergoing treatment for an undisclosed medical condition over the course of several months.

Naluark: Naluark was transferred to Mystic Aquarium & Institute for Exploration in Mystic, Connecticut, in October 2011. He has since been moved to SeaWorld Orlando in 2016.

Naya: Naya first arrived at Shedd Aquarium in 1992. She has since had four calves. Her first was a stillborn in 2002. She then gave birth on December 20, 2009, to a 162-pound, five-foot two-inch male calf, though the calf died two days later from complications during birth. In 2020, Naya gave birth to premature twins. The first calf, a female born head first, survived being born. The second calf, born tail first, was a stillborn. Unfortunately, because the calves were premature twins, the first calf had multiple health issues and died 15 days later despite being in the care of staff members.

=== California Sea Lions ===
Currently, there are three California sea lions residing in the Grainger Sea Lion Cove exhibit. They are Cruz (M), Charger (M), and Leguna (M).

Cruz was shot in the face which left him fully blind and was found near the beaches of Santa Cruz, California, in 2012. After being healed and rehabilitated by The Marine Mammal Center, the Shedd Aquarium stepped up to house Cruz in 2013. Due to his impairment, he receives specialized sound-based training and even participates in the public Animal Spotlights at the aquarium.

Charger is a second-generation sea lion who was fathered by Tanner, one of the aquarium's former residents. He arrived to the aquarium in 2022 from the Smithsonian's National Zoo and Conservation Biology Institute in Washington, D.C. at the age of 3, along with Kenney, his pup. For a brief moment in time, the aquarium held three-generations of sea lions under one roof.

Leguna is a sea lion who was one of many that was impacted by an unusual mortality event (UME) in early 2013. He was rehabilitated and released in March of the same year, however, he was found stranded six weeks later. After being rehabilitated once again, he was deemed unreleasable and was given to Shedd Aquarium, who volunteered their facility as a home for a male sea lion during the UME.

Former residents of the Cove include:

Ty (Tyler) (M) who was a sea lion who was trained at the U.S. Navy's Marine Mammal Program until 2005, where a cataract was discovered in one of his eyes and he was "honorably medically discharged". The aquarium volunteered to take him in and he was a part of the colony until 2019, where he died due to acute liver failure at the age of 18.

Tanner (M) was the father of Charger and the grandfather of Kenney. In 2013, he was relocated away from the Bonneville Dam to protect endangered salmon populations and was tagged as "CO11". The relocation failed as he returned to the area and instead of being culled, he was given a second opportunity, arriving with Cruz to the aquarium. He died in December 2024 after he failed to recover from sedation after an exam that found a tumor mass.

Biff (M) was a sea lion who was relocated away from the Bonneville Dam and was tagged as "C-700". Like Tanner, the relocation failed but the aquarium stepped in to provide him a second chance. Once he arrived, he was 200 pounds over the healthy weight of an adult male sea lion, measuring at over 800 pounds. He would lose the weight during his stay, but in late 2021, his health started to decline. CT Scans discovered that he had an untreatable spinal infection and he was humanly euthanized in November of that year.

Otis (M) was a sea lion who came to the Shedd Aquarium along with Biff in 2009. Just like Biff, Otis was relocated away from the Bonneville Dam and marked as "C-507", only for the relocation to fail. Once he arrived at the aquarium, trainers noted that he was a fast learner and both he and Bliff had to slim down due to them not needing to compete for a harem. Unfortunately, Otis developed cancer and was humanly euthanized in March of 2012.

Kenney (M) was a third-generation sea lion who was fathered by Charger. He arrived at the aquarium along with his father, being the youngest sea lion ever to be housed in the Shedd Aquarium's history. He stayed at the Shedd, outside of the public eye, until April 2026, where he was transferred to Utah's Hogle Zoo as part of a Species Survival Plan to provide Maverick, Hogle Zoo's sea lion, a companion. Unfortunately, Kenney died suddenly on May 15, 2026, due to acute liver failure after trainers noticed him being lethargic a few days prior.

=== Alaskan sea otters ===
Yaku (son of Kenai) was euthanized on February 26, 2022, due to failing health brought on by a tumor in his chest.

Kenai (Exxon Valdez oil spill survivor) was euthanized on October 9, 2012, due to failing health brought on by advancing years.

Kachemak (oldest sea otter in a North American Aquarium/Zoo) was euthanized on August 24, 2013, due to failing health related to age.

Seldovia (M) arrived at the Shedd Aquarium on November 29, 2023. He is currently the only Alaskan sea otter at Shedd and shares his habitat with the Southern sea otters.

=== Southern sea otters ===
Luna (F), Cooper (M), Watson (M), Jade (F).

=== Pacific white-sided dolphins ===
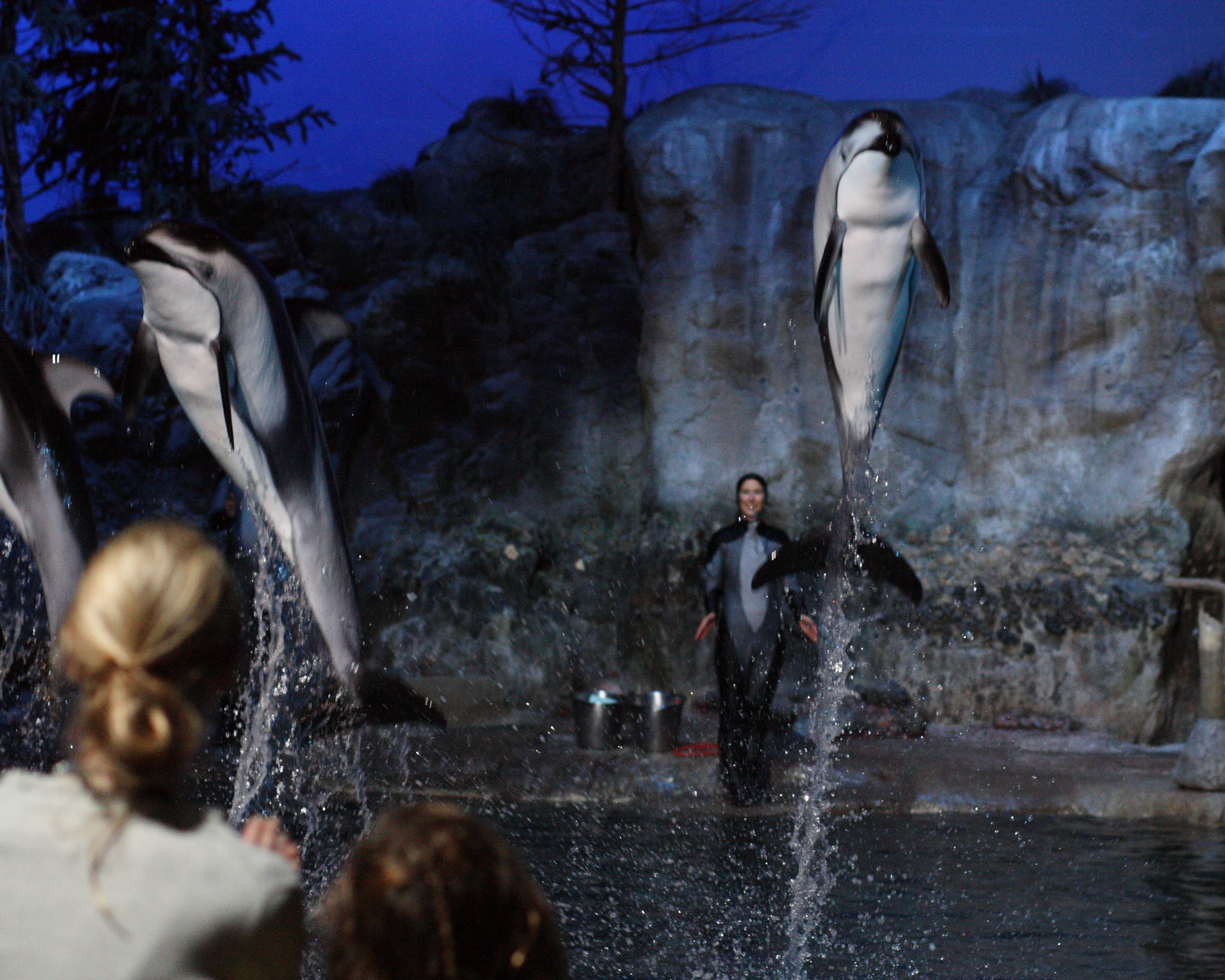
Pacific white-sided dolphins at one of the aquatic shows.

The aquarium has four white sided dolphins: Kri (F), Katrl (F), Munchkin (F), and Makoa (M).

Males Sagu and Makoa were conceived by Li'i at the Miami Seaquarium when Piquet was on a breeding loan there. Piquet gave birth to Sagu on Memorial Day weekend in 2012. Piquet gave birth to her second calf, Makoa, on June 1, 2015. Piquet was moved to Miami Seaquarium in early 2018 for a breeding loan and Ipo was transferred to Shedd to take her place. Piquet was later transferred back in May 2019. In August of that year, she miscarried a calf sired by Li'i. Ipo and Piquet were moved to SeaWorld San Antonio in October 2020. Sagu died in May 2021.

Kri has lived at the Shedd Aquarium on and off since 1991. She was transferred to the Mystic Aquarium in 2009 due to construction on Shedd's oceanarium, and the Miami Seaquarium in 2013 for a breeding loan. Kri had a stillborn calf in 2003 that was sired through artificial insemination.

Katrl first arrived along with Piquet to Shedd Aquarium in 1993. On April 18, 2016, Katrl gave birth to a male calf sired by Li'i. The calf was placed on display on June 18, 2016, and was named Kukdlaa, meaning "Bubbles" in the Tlingit language. Kukdlaa died in 2019. Harmony was born to Katrl and Sagu on August 31, 2020, hours after a rare twin beluga birth.

Loke and her then 5-year-old son Elelo arrived to Shedd Aquarium on August 3, 2023, after living off-display at the Miami Seaquarium for Elelo's entire life. The move was a result of several USDA reports that noted Miami Seaquarium's poor facility state. It is unknown if the two will be transferred back, as the Miami Seaquarium's remaining Pacific white-sided dolphin, Li'i, was transferred to SeaWorld San Antonio in September 2023.

=== Green sea turtle ===
Nickel

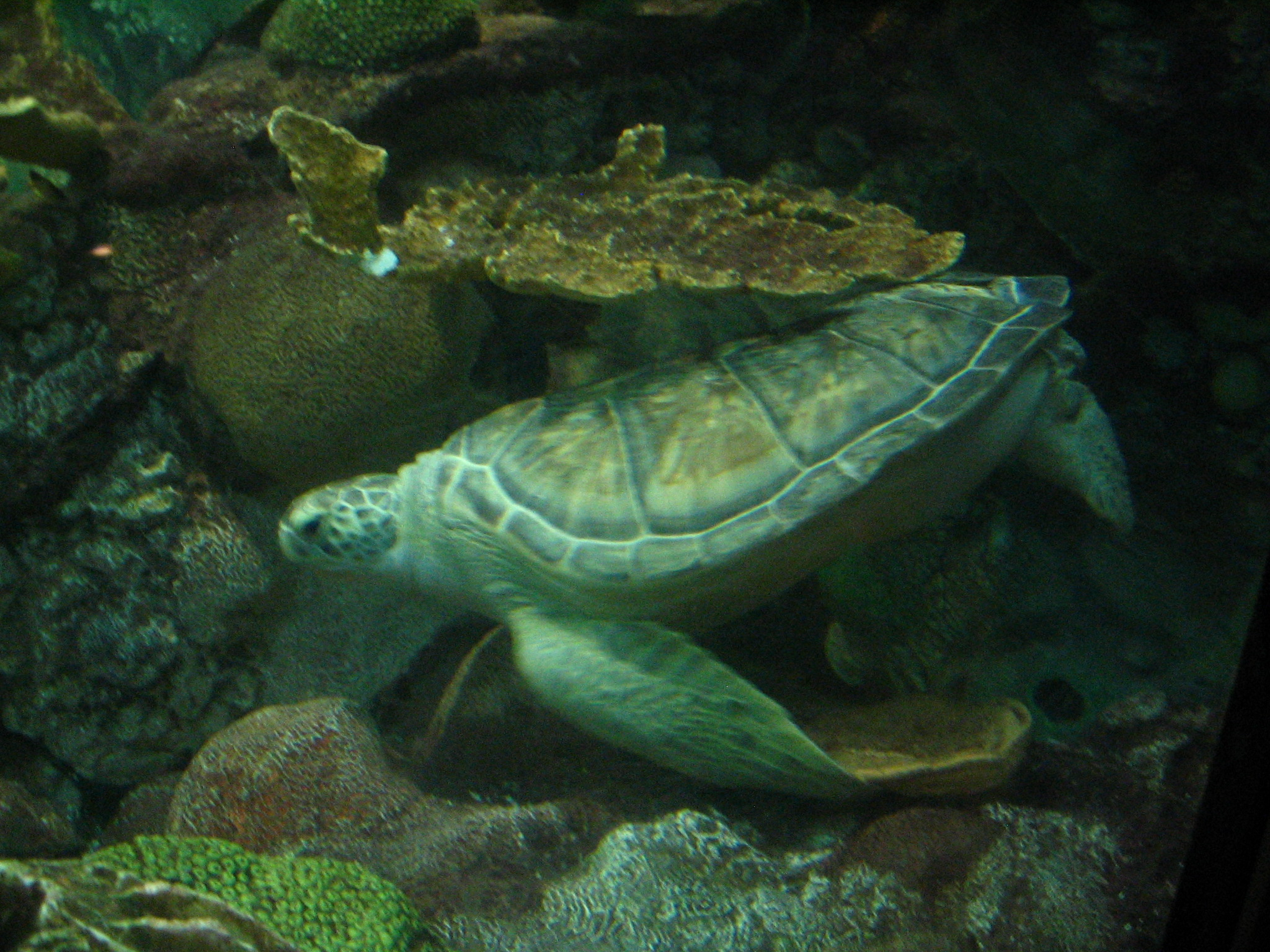
Nickel, a Green sea turtle resting at the aquarium.

Nickel is a female green sea turtle who resides at the Caribbean Reef exhibit located directly in front of the main lobby. Nickel was rescued Florida's Gulf Coast area in 1998, where she was struck by a motorboat. This accident damaged her shell and paralyzed her from the waist down, causing her to have buoyancy problems.

Researchers believed she could no longer live in the wild, so she was brought to Shedd in the spring of 2003. Upon her arrival, she went through several medical examinations, including an x-ray. The x-ray revealed a 1975 nickel lodged in her throat, which provided her namesake. She serves as an example to aquarium visitors of the effects human activities can have on wildlife.

=== North American river otter ===
Rio

Euthanized on October 29, 2013, due to age related health issues, Rio was 21 and lived well past the median life expectancy of a North American river otter.

=== Grouper ===
Bubba

Bubba, a male Queensland grouper, was believed to be the first fish to undergo chemotherapy. He was introduced to the aquarium in 1987 and died in 2006.

=== Tarpon ===
Deadeye

Deadeye, a female Atlantic tarpon, was the oldest fish to reside at the Caribbean Reef in the aquarium. She was first introduced to the aquarium in 1935 and died in 1998.

== Conservation and research ==
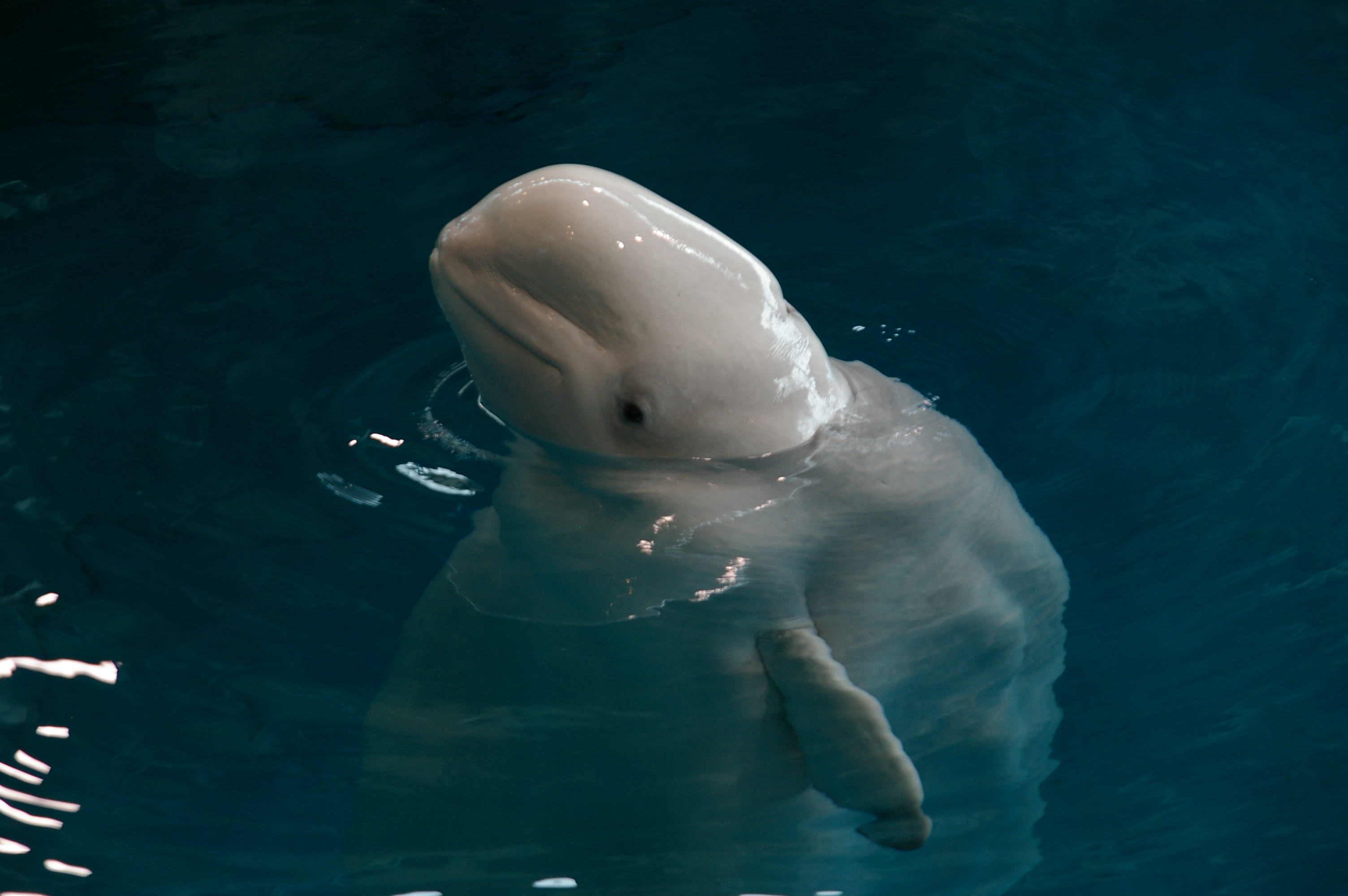
Beluga whales are one area of research and conservation for the aquarium.

The Daniel P. Haerther Center for Conservation and Research helps to provide on-site research at the aquarium. They study topics such as animal health and behavior, nutrition, animal training, reproduction and genetics.

The International Union for Conservation of Nature (IUCN) designated the Shedd Aquarium as its Center for Species Survival:Freshwater, to study and promote the conservation and restoration of global freshwater systems, and strategies for freshwater species survival.

The aquarium also partners with conservation efforts in the Caribbean and Southeast Asia. The Bahamian rock iguana is one of the most endangered lizards in the world. Since 1994, the Shedd Aquarium has been studying and providing conservation plans for this iguana. The Shedd Aquarium is now recognized as the lead authority on this iguana. In Southeast Asia, the Shedd partners with Project Seahorse to monitor and map out the seahorse populations in Southeast Asia.

Since 1991, the Shedd Aquarium has been involved with research focused on beluga whales. They focus on the animal handling procedures to ensure the animals’ welfare. The aquarium conducts most of their beluga whale research in Bristol Bay in southwest Alaska.

== Gallery ==
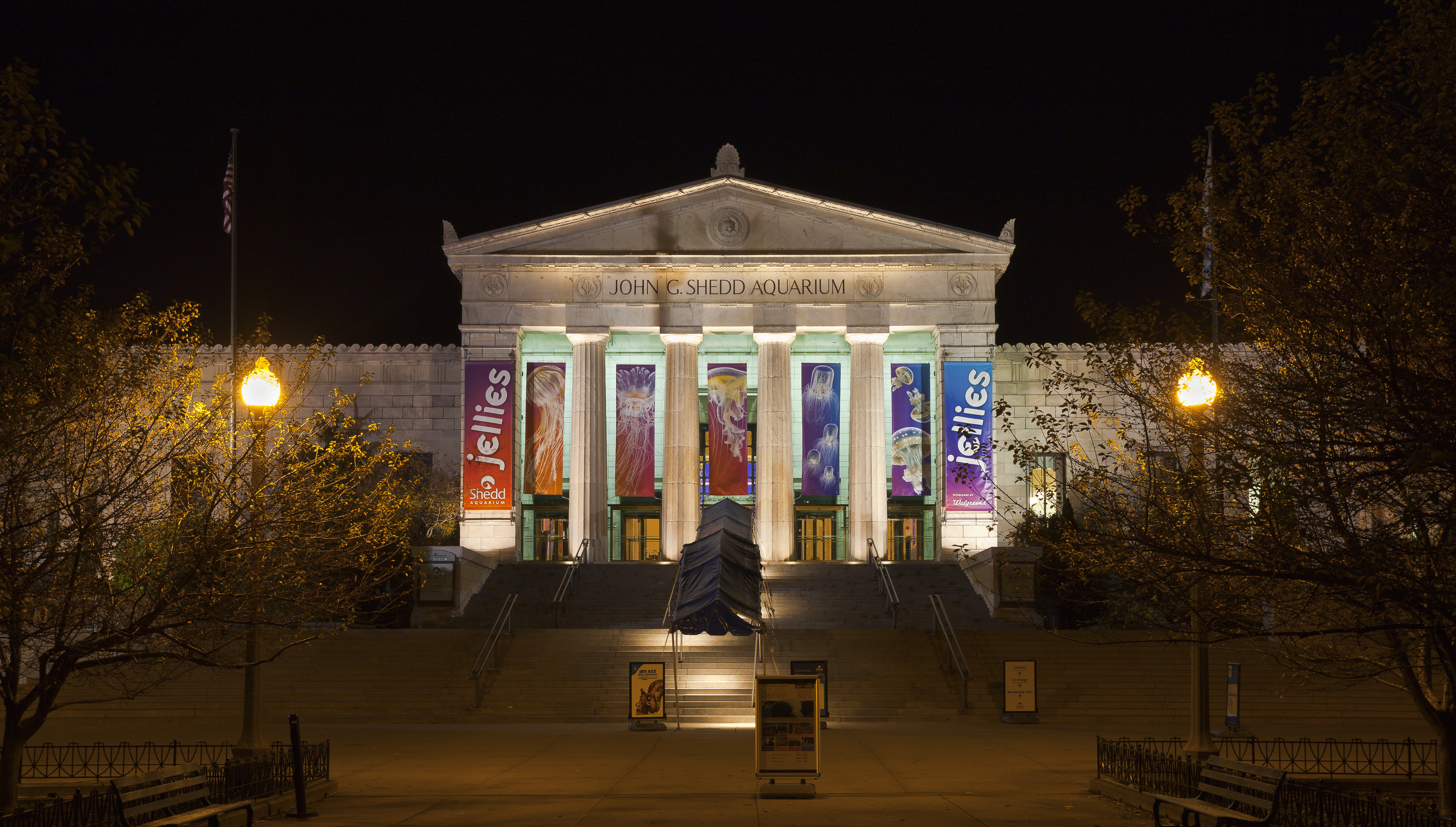
Main entrance at night.

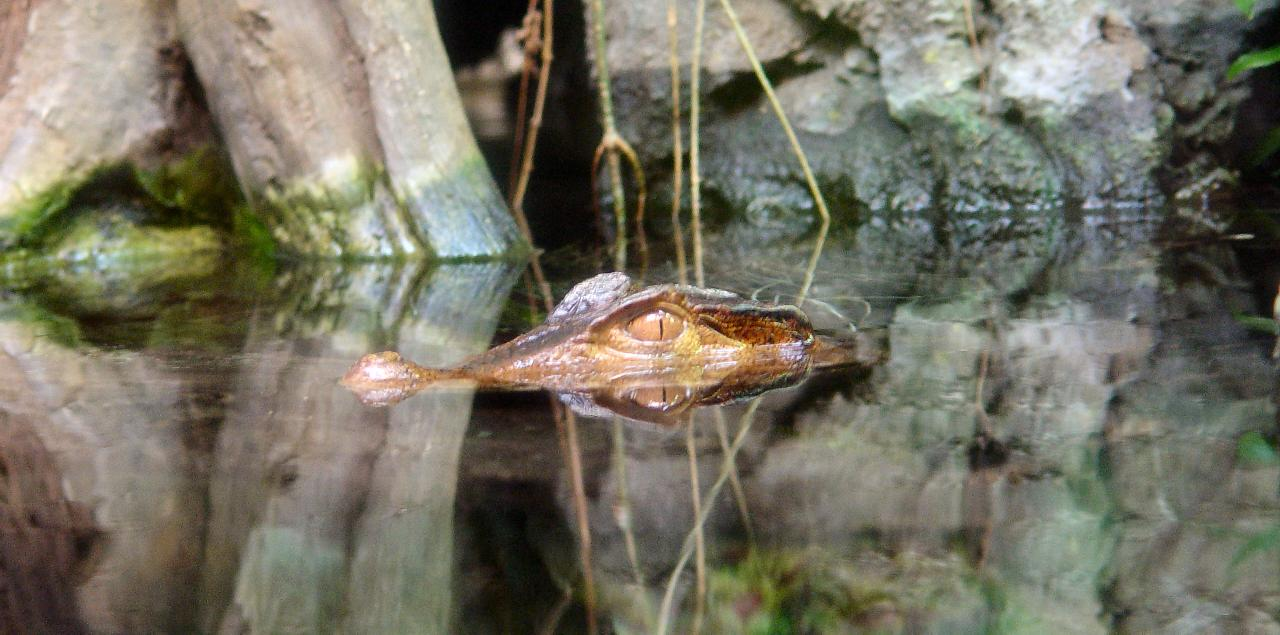
Cuvier's Dwarf Caiman in one of the exhibits.

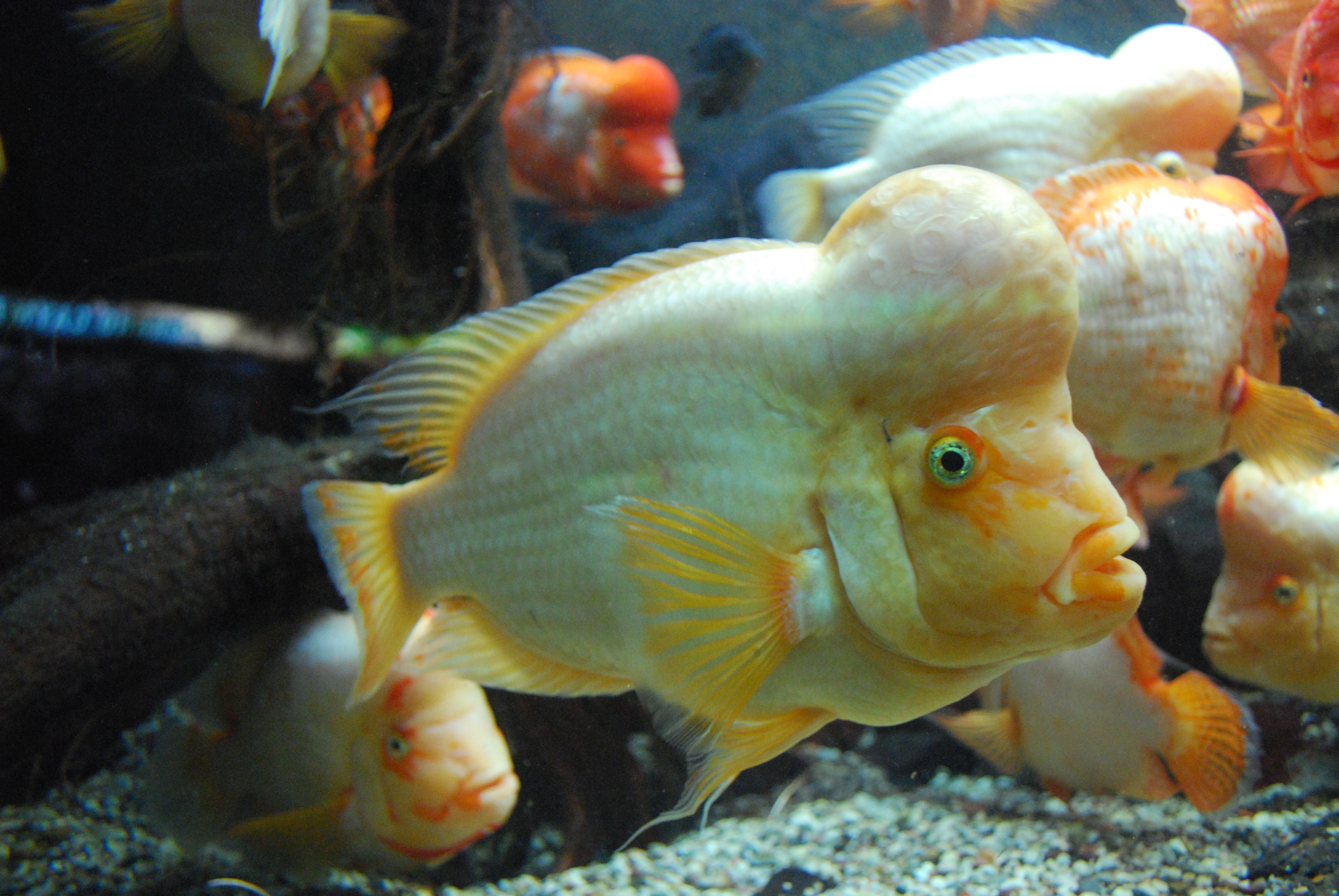
Amphilophus citrinellus.

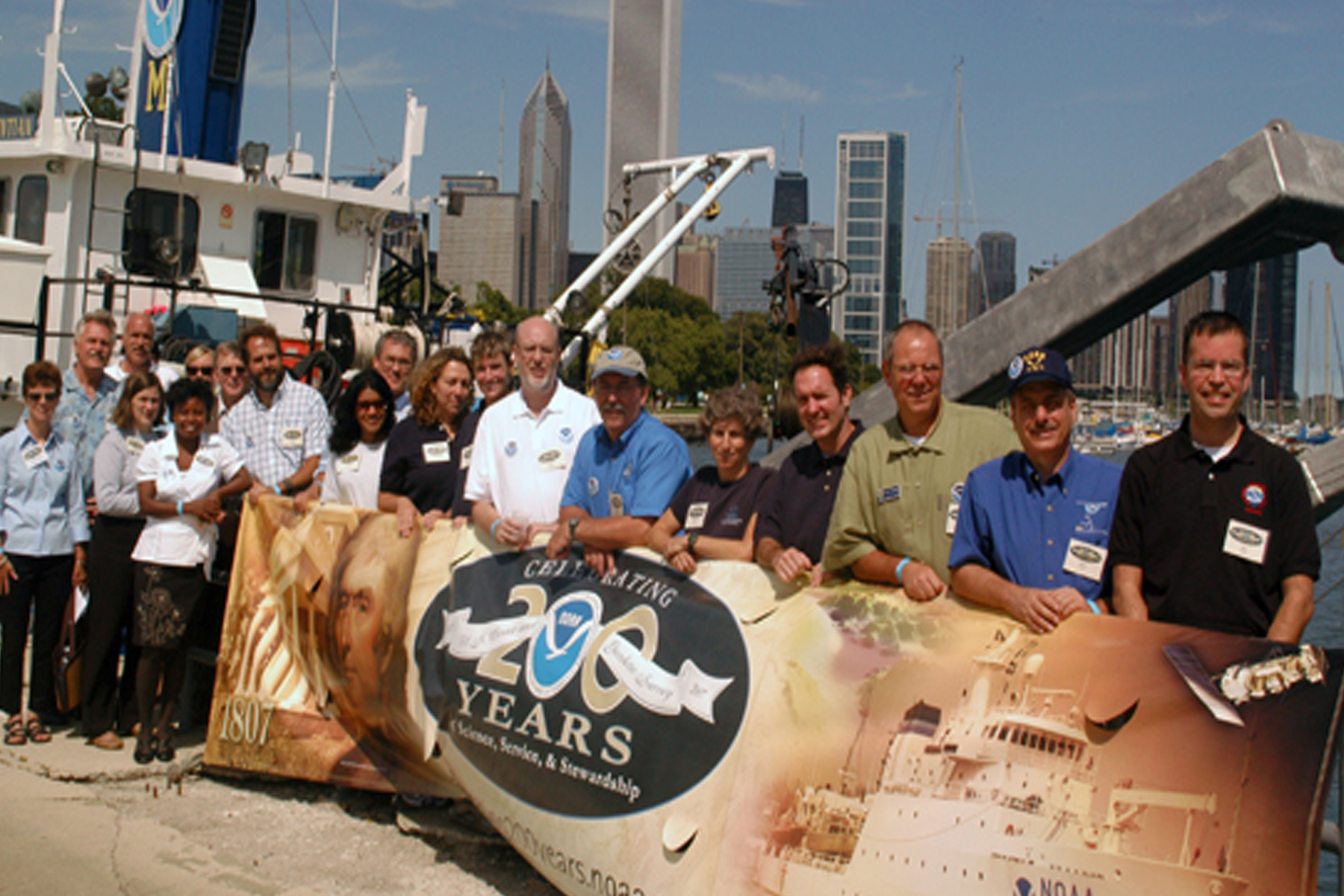
Community event co-hosted with NOAA celebrating 200 years of the agency.

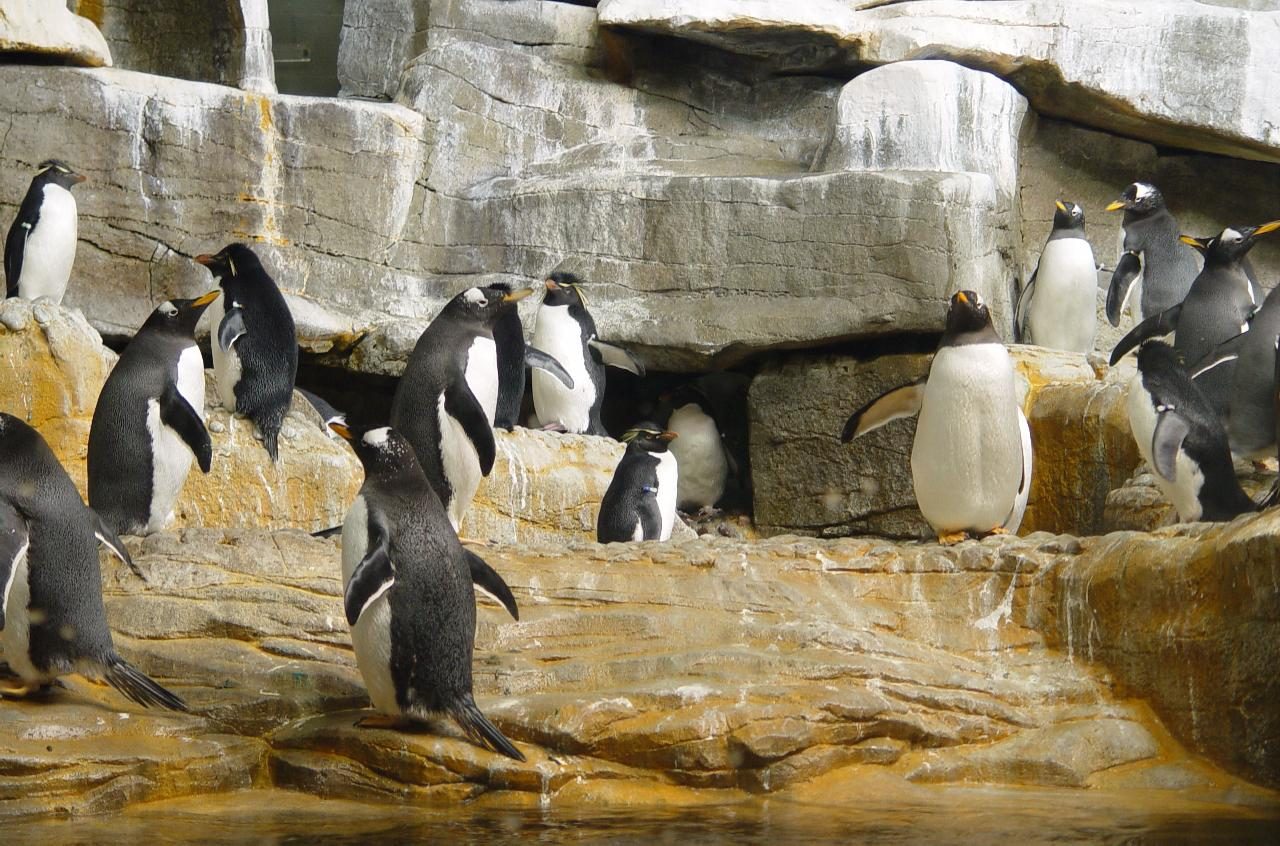
Southern rockhoppers and gentoos at the penguin habitat.

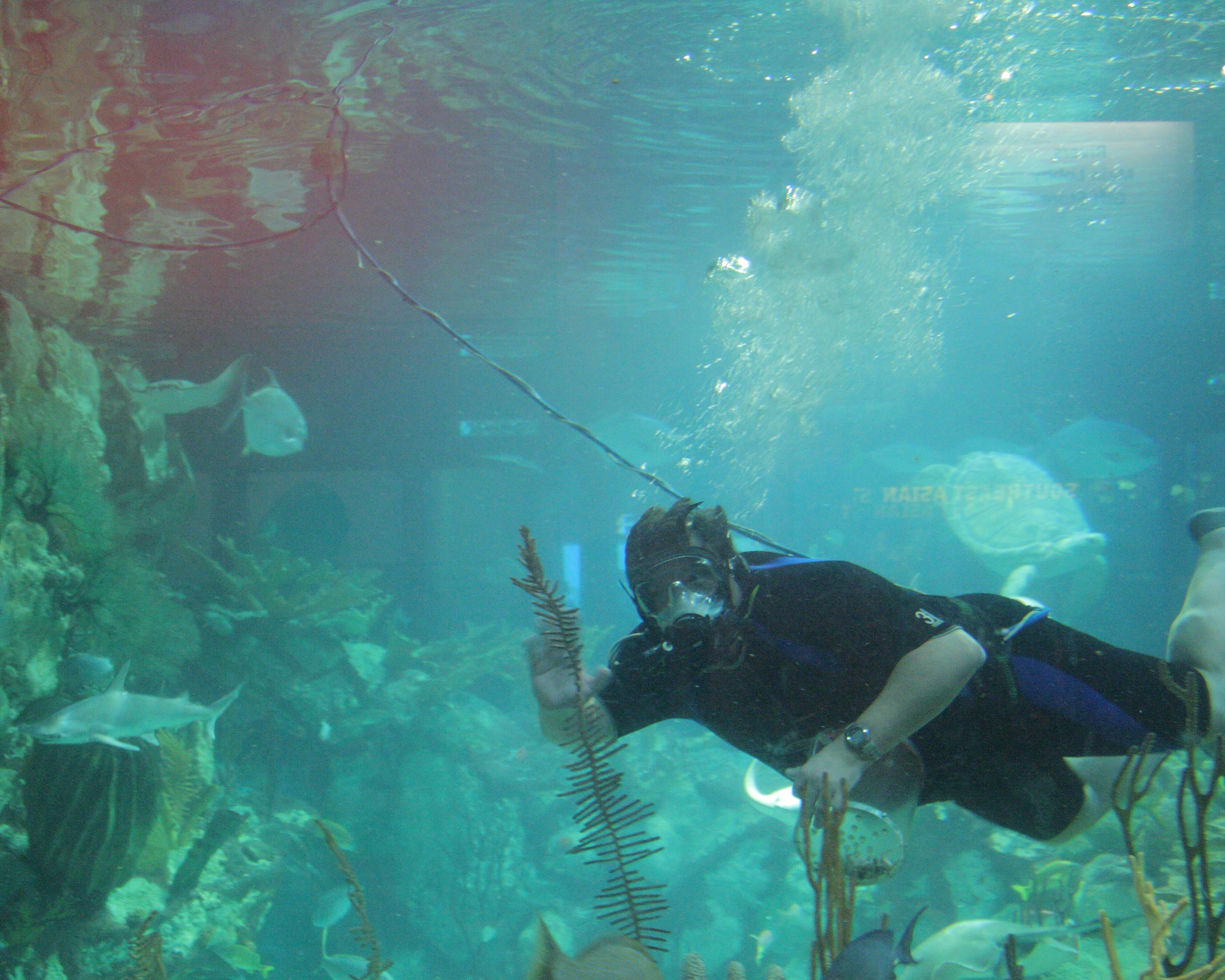
A diver in the Caribbean Reef exhibit tank.

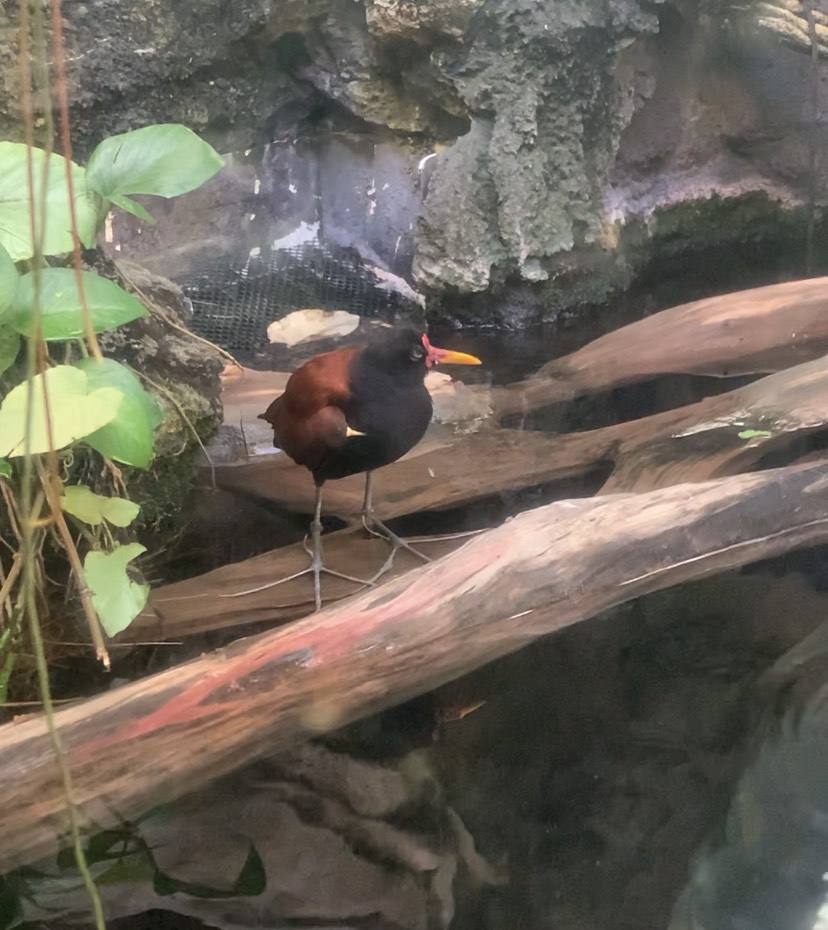
Wattled jacana (Jacana jacana) at the Amazon Rising exhibit.

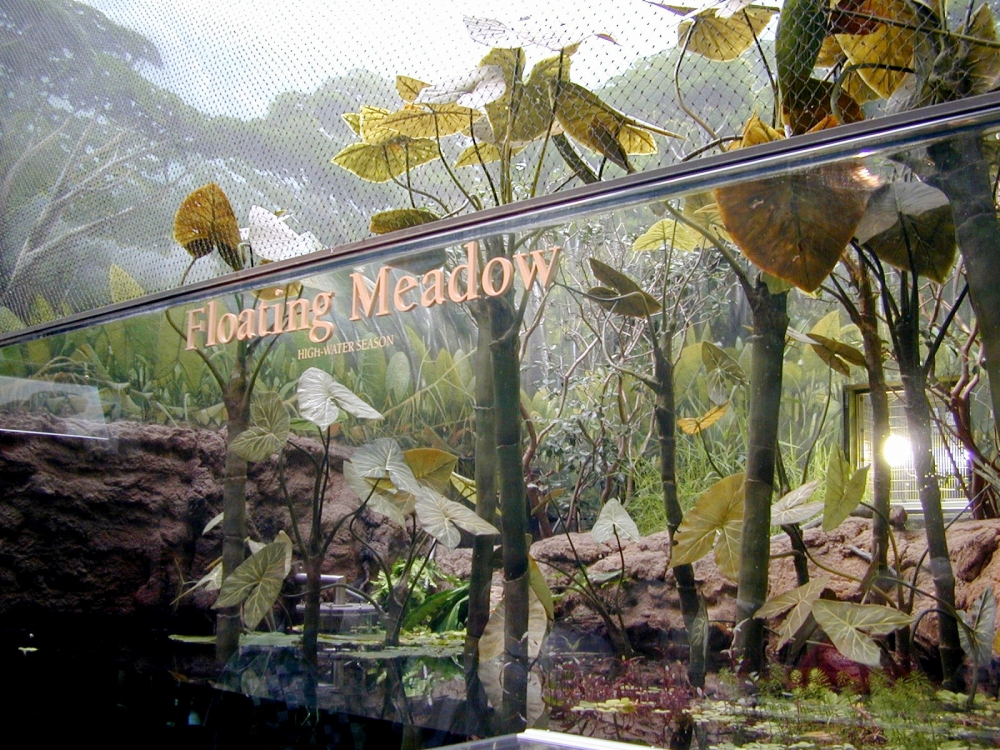
Floating Meadow exhibit.

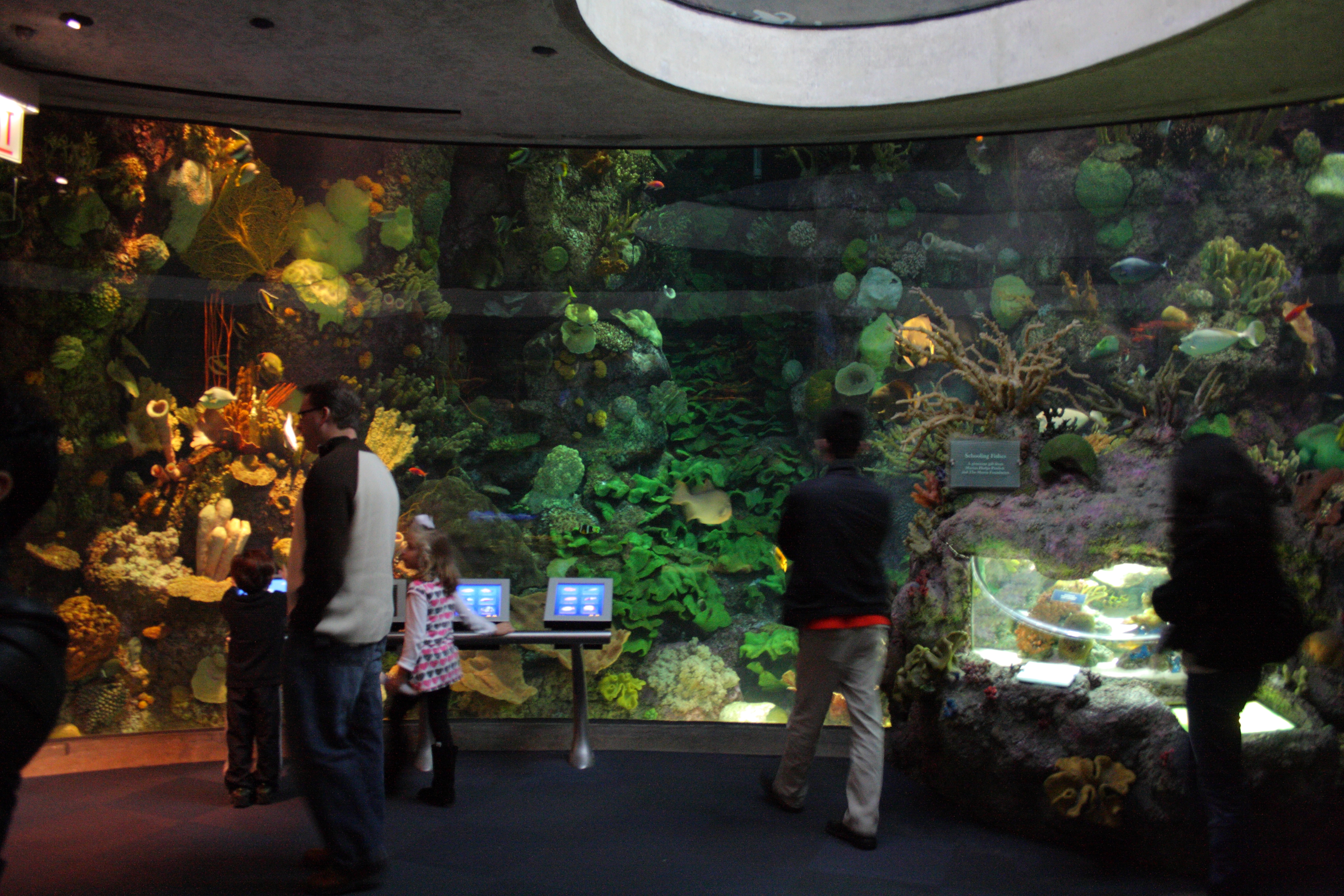
Wild Reef exhibit.

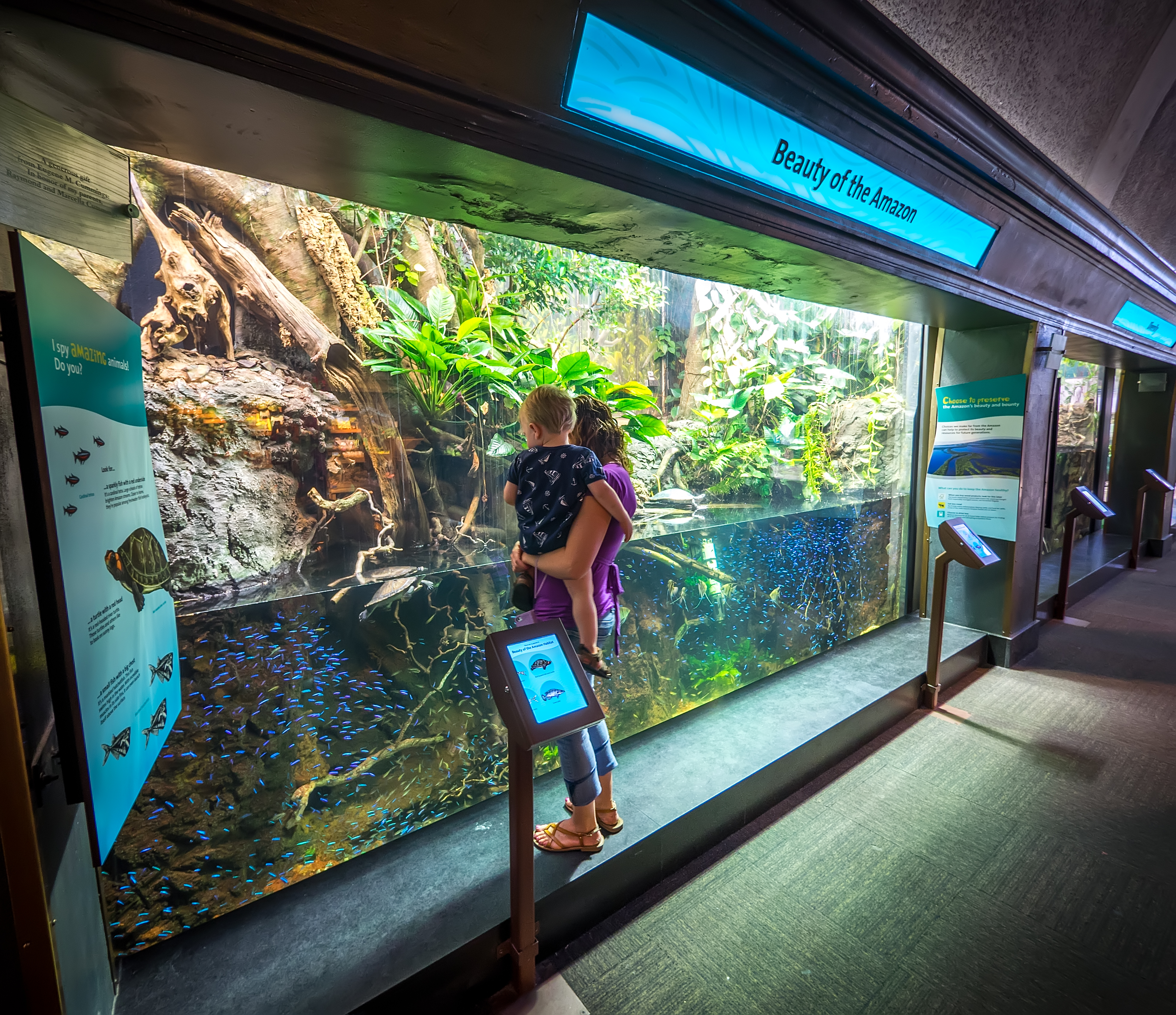
Beauty of the Amazon exhibit.

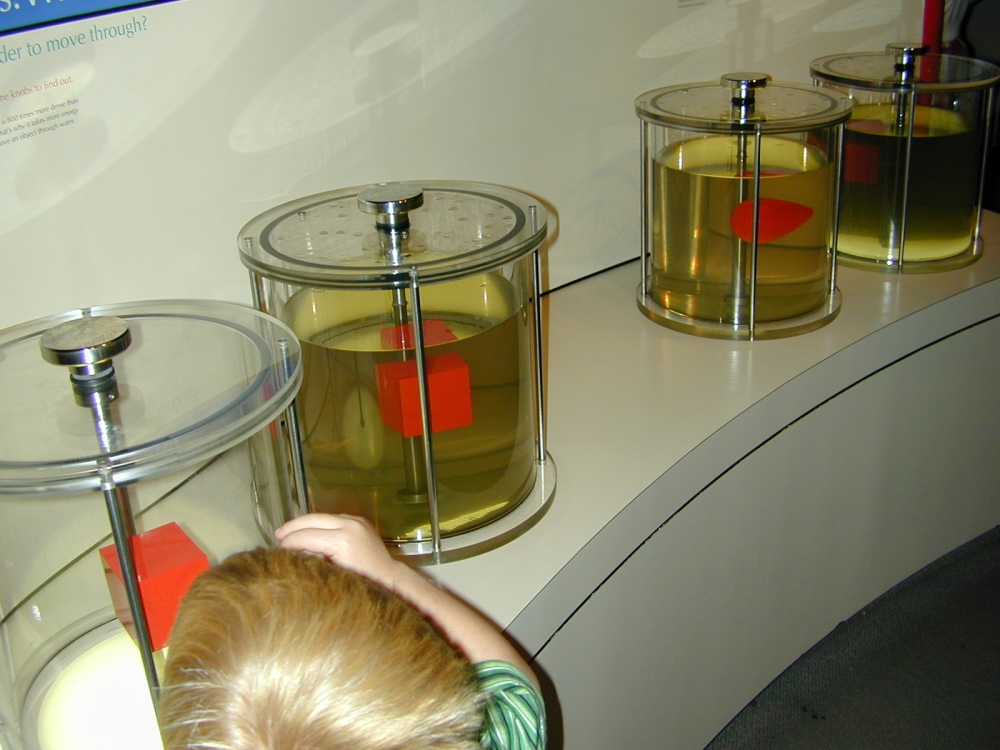
Educational exhibit.

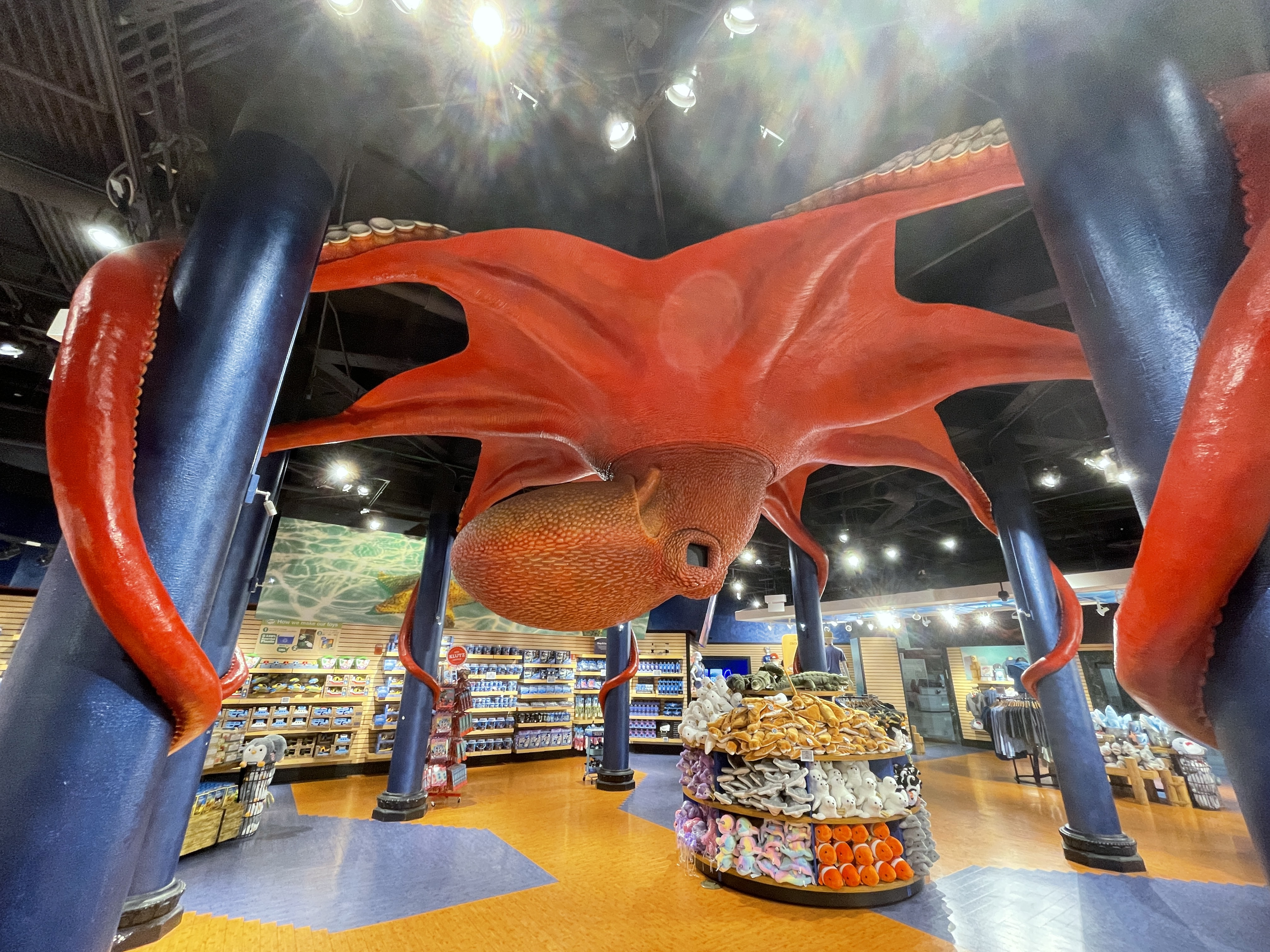
Octopus sculpture in the gift store.

Video of a Comb jelly.
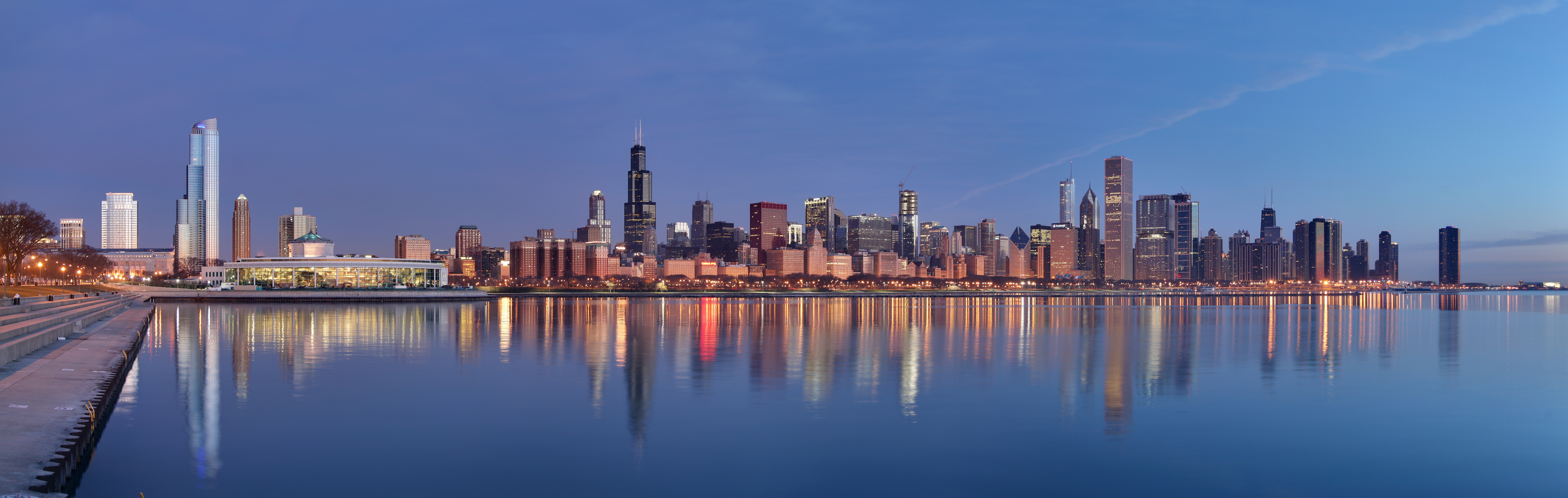
Chicago skyline at sunrise, viewed from the east; the Shedd Aquarium is the building on the bottom left.

== See also ==
- List of museums and cultural institutions in Chicago
- Chicago architecture
- Culture of Chicago
- Art Institute of Chicago
- Lincoln Park Zoo
- Brookfield Zoo
- Museum of Science and Industry (Chicago)
- List of National Historic Landmarks in Illinois

== General and cited references ==
- Oceanarium Press Kit
