= Whale Sanctuary Project =

Canadian conservation initiative

The Whale Sanctuary Project
- Formation: April 2016; 10 years ago
- Founded at: Washington, D.C.
- Type: Nonprofit
- Tax ID no.: 81-2276219
- Legal status: 501(c)(3) tax-exempt nonprofit in the United States
- Purpose: Animal welfare, marine mammal conservation, and sanctuary for retired captive whales
- Location: Port Hilford, Nova Scotia, Canada
- Executive Director: Charles Vinick
- President and co-founder: Dr. Lori Marino
- Director of Field Operations and Research: Jeff Foster
- Revenue: $1,763,204 (2023)
- Expenses: $1,915,445 (2023)
- Awards: IndieFEST Awards of Excellence for categories Documentary Short and Nature/Environment/Wildlife.
- Website: whalesanctuaryproject.org

The Whale Sanctuary Project is a nonprofit initiative based in Nova Scotia, Canada. Established in April 2016, the project aims to construct a permanent seaside sanctuary for retired captive whales, including orcas and belugas. It had received support from various animal welfare organizations and also coordinated rescue efforts of captive whales in Russia, Marineland of Canada and marine parks in France.

== History ==
In April 2016, the Whale Sanctuary Project (WSP) was incorporated in Washington, D.C. with founding board members Dr. Lori Marino, David Phillips, and Dr. Naomi Rose. CEO of Munchkin Inc., Steve B. Dunn pledged $1 million to locate a suitable site for a sanctuary. In May 2017, preliminary work commenced, including financial projections for the construction of animal care and veterinary facilities, staff and administrative quarters, housing, and plans for a public education and outreach center. Additionally, over 120 potential sites in Washington State, British Columbia, Maine and Nova Scotia were revised, which was eventually narrowed down to 30.

In August 2018, The Whale Sanctuary Project participated in a joint-effort with the National Oceanic & Atmospheric Administration in the Pacific Northwest to save the life of a 4-year-old orca calf known as Scarlett. However, the calf did not survive. In April 2019, a team of Whale Sanctuary Project members was invited by the Russian government to formulate a rescue operation for 97 captured cetaceans, known as Whale Aid. In June of that year, the first group of captive whales were released into the ocean from which they were captured in. In October 2019, a site of Port Hilford Bay, Nova Scotia was idealized as it met all design requirements for a seaside sanctuary.

=== Selection of site ===
In January 2020, members of The Whale Sanctuary Project met with Regional Chief Paul Prosper and First Nations Mi'kmaq people. In February 2020, Port Hilford, Nova Scotia was selected for the creation of a sanctuary. Due to the outbreak of the COVID-19 pandemic in March 2020, further development was delayed. However, freshwater surveys, algae samples, seasonal marine and fresh waters samples, and water temperature and level analyses were conducted through 2021. Additional surveys included the deployment of hydrophones and microphones in June 2020, hydrodynamic modeling work in July 2020, and multiple studies such as multibeam sonar mapping, benthic surveying, and flushing rate surveying were completed on July–September 2020.

In March 2021, site surveying of Port Hilford was completed. The specific placement of the sanctuary enclosure was determined between Wine Harbour and Barachois Island. Following this, a lidar survey was conducted in July 2021, with additional multibeam sonar mapping and deployment of hydrophones and microphones. These surveys were conducted to ensure how sound may affect cetaceans. In August 2021, a lab analysis was conducted on water and sediment sampled from various locations of the bay.

In October 2021, the Operations & Visitors Center was opened in Sherbrooke, Nova Scotia. A formal ceremony was held, notably attended by First Nations people and Hon. Wilfred Moore. Canadian Mi'kmaq artist Alan Syliboy also donated two paintings to the center. In December 2021, preliminary discussions were held with Marineland of Canada about the feasibility of transferring retired cetaceans from their facility to the sanctuary. However, after Niagara law enforcement charged Marineland for violating the 2019 Ending the Captivity of Whales and Dolphins Act, further discussions ceased. In March 2022, the WSP was leased 205 acres of the bay by the Canadian government's Department of Natural Resources & Renewables for a period of 20 years. The offer included an annual payment of $14.37 per hectare, which is approximately $1,200 for the whole lot.

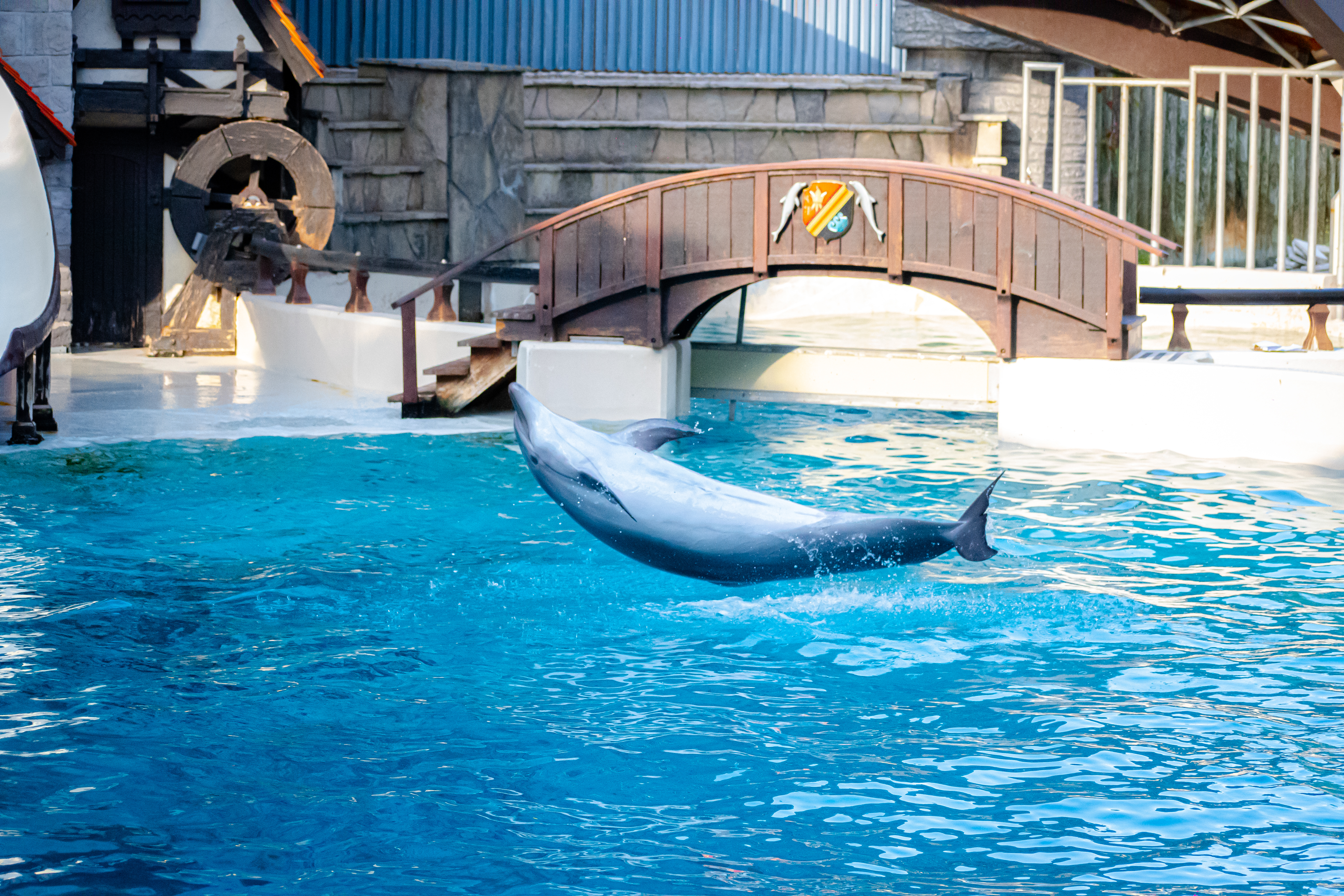
One of the last captive Dolphins of Canada

In March 2022, hydrodynamic modeling and LiDAR scanning had complete. In April 2022, structural, electrical, mechanical, and geotechnical engineering studies were conducted at the sanctuary site to determine the installation of power, water and septic systems. In June 2022, the WSP formally signed the Department of Natural Resources & Renewables’ offer of lease. In August 2022, the two-year study of tidal flows, water pressure and other weather conditions was completed. Additionally, a work boat was funded by donations from members of the Animal Welfare Institute.

In November 2022, the Archeologically Resource Impact Assessment was completed. On 8 December 2022, the Wendy P. McCaw Foundation funded $5 million towards the construction of the sanctuary buildings and bay pen. Additionally, the WSP received financial support from the federal Department of Fisheries and Oceans’ Ghost Gear Fund and the Municipality of the District of St. Mary's, the Fishing Gear Coalition of Atlantic Canada.

By April 2023, all environmental analyses to determine the recent and current use by Mi’kmaq people had complete. In June 2023, preliminary in-water field surveys were conducted to establish parameters for the final study of the Environmental Site Assessment (ESA). In July 2023, a team of divers was assembled to collect 27 sediment samples for the ESA III, which acted as the last of the studies.

In February 2024, the WSP and French non-governmental organization One Voice proposed a collaboration to retire orcas Wikie, Inouk, and Keijo from Marineland Antibes and transport them to the sanctuary. In March 2024, design of the full sanctuary was accelerated to accommodate the three whales, with temporary facilities being prepared for regular care of the whales. In June 2024, work proceeded on the design of the bay pen, which would be equipped to handle aspects of veterinary and routine care for the whales. In September 2024, the French government's General Inspectorate of the Environment & Sustainable Development recommended the WSP as the best sanctuary solution for orcas Wikie and Keijo. In October 2024, a buoy was deployed to provide environmental data for monitoring the sanctuary site. In November 2024, the WSP and Lotte World Aquarium signed a joint Letter of Intent for the relocation of a beluga whale named Bella. In January 2025, the three-year environmental analysis of the sanctuary site was completed. Following the Spanish government rejection of the transfer of two orcas to Loro Parque zoo in April 2025, the WSP began preparations for the potential transfer of the whales.

=== Approval ===
On 10 October 2025, the Nova Scotia government received a report and recommendation from former natural resources minister Tory Rushton. Subsequently, the government issued an Order in Council 11 days later, approving a 20-year crown lease for the 81-hectares of land and ocean. The 20-year lease is also renewable for a second term. Following the decision, the WSP is able to proceed with construction before welcoming its first whales from captivity. According to Charles Vinick, there was an insufficient amount of funding requiring to construct the extensive facilities, which primarily include the construction of enclosures and refurbishment of the wharf. By December 2025, the WSP only had US$2 million out of US$13–15 fundraising goal.

=== Construction ===
In March 2026, R.J. MacIsaac Construction Ltd. was awarded as the general contractor for the WSP. Land clearing for the laying of power lines commenced on 12 March. After 10 years of planning, the Whale Sanctuary Project held its groundbreaking ceremony on 19 June 2026. The event was attended by locals and attracted a group of protestors, as construction would block access to the ocean for some residents. It also took place before the Crown lease was signed.

== Challenges ==
The Whale Sanctuary Project faced many challenges throughout its development. Despite receiving a Crown lease for 81 hectares of land and water near Wine Harbour, five affected property owners must grant unanimous consent. In March 2025, only two of the five property owners written consent to the WSP, holding back further development progress.

Nova Scotia also faces harsh weather in which an exposed facility would not be able to withstand such adverse conditions. The netting would require constant maintenance due to the formation of icing during the winter and the accumulation of algae in the summer. The site itself also contains contaminants caused by leftover tailings from historic mining at Wine Harbour. In 1860, gold was first discovered in the Cove by Joseph Smith, triggering a local gold rush along the northeastern shore that continued until decline by the 1930s. These contaminants included high concentrations of arsenic and mercury found within the soil and sediment.

== Design ==
The pool will span 40 hectares with a perimeter of 2.4 km and a maximum depth of 18 meters, which can allow up to 10 whales to be housed. A visitor centre has been built on a hill overlooking the site, however there will be no public access to the pool. The sanctuary is aimed at allowing cetaceans to be rehabilitated in a natural environment, exposed to wind, waves and the natural conditions of the environment, while still receiving constant veterinarian care.

The total length of the net pen is 1,607 meters, while the total cork line length is 1,743 meters. It would be installed by marine engineers by using a traditional anchoring system. Sanctuary buildings will include an animal care & veterinary center encompassing 2,700 square ft, a marine operations, security and administration building encompassing 3,750 square feet, a net loft and generator storage building encompassing 2,520 square feet, and an observation tower encompassing 288 square feet.
