= John Holer =

Slovenian-Canadian businessperson (1935 – 2018)

- Born: Ivan Holer; August 15, 1935; Žice, Drava Banovina, Kingdom of Yugoslavia
- Died: June 23, 2018 (aged 82); Niagara Falls, Ontario, Canada
- Known for: Marineland of Canada

John Holer (born Ivan Holer; August 15, 1935 – June 23, 2018) was a Slovenian-Canadian businessman. An immigrant to Canada, Holer is most notable for founding Marineland of Canada in Niagara Falls, Ontario, Canada. He founded the park in the early 1960s and managed it until his death in 2018.

== Early life ==
Holer was born in Žice, a village in Slovenia, then part of Yugoslavia. His family were farmers and vintners in a wine region. Holer himself studied the chemistry of wine in technical school. After the Second World War, when Communists expropriated part of the family farm, Holer left the country, moving to Graz, Austria. He worked at a winery before travelling to West Germany, where he gained employment with Circus Krone and learned to train animals.

== Move to Canada and career ==
Holer immigrated to Canada in 1957, settling in the Niagara area. Holer worked at various jobs, including at the Canada Steamship Lines dry dock at Welland, Ontario. Observing a damaged submarine at the dry dock, Holer and a partner devised an idea for an underwater submarine ride, plans of which they sold to The Walt Disney Company for CA$14,000. Using some of the proceeds, Holer, with a partner, bought part of the Harry Oakes estate in Niagara Falls on which to build an animal attraction for Niagara tourists, doing some of the building himself. The "Marine Wonderland and Animal Farm" opened in 1961. Holer had welded two large steel tanks together and brought in three sea lions and charged one quarter for admission and another to feed the animals. The attraction also featured an underwater show featuring two female swimmers.

Holer owned and supervised Marineland of Canada, as it was later named, until his death in 2018. Holer was known to drive around the park in his truck, personally supervising. Marineland expanded in the 1970s and 1980s, adding marine mammals (orcas, belugas and dolphins), land animals and large rides, including a large roller coaster and tower drop ride. The park's keeping of marine mammals attracted the attention of animal activists, opposed to the keeping of the animals in captivity, who would protest outside the park's gates. The death of a beluga whale in 1999 led to Holer receiving arson threats. In 2004, Holer purchased a trailer park neighboring Marineland, and in 2009 evicted all 47 families living there. In the 2010s, the park was investigated several times for animal cruelty. Through it all, Holer insisted that his animals were well taken care of, and initiated lawsuits against former employees, activists and the Ontario Society for the Prevention of Cruelty to Animals.

== Death ==
Holer died on June 23, 2018, aged 82. He was praised as an "immigrant success story" by Senator Don Plett (Manitoba). Holer had been seriously ill for five months, and died at his home on Chippawa Parkway.

Holer's wife of 46 years, Marie, died in 2024. They are survived by their son, Peter. Another son, John Mark Jr., died in 2013. He was interred at Fairview Cemetery. Marineland was operated by 'Holer Family Amusements', a company founded by his family after he died, from 2018 to 2024 and has ceased operations and been held in trust since Marie Holer's death in 2024. Since 2024, Marineland has been in the process of seeking approval to transfer its wildlife to other facilities, mortgaging its undeveloped land, and subdividing its property for redevelopment. In 2026, a number of the ocean mammals were transferred to aquariums in Spain and United States.
