= Juno (whale) =

Captive beluga whale in Connecticut, US

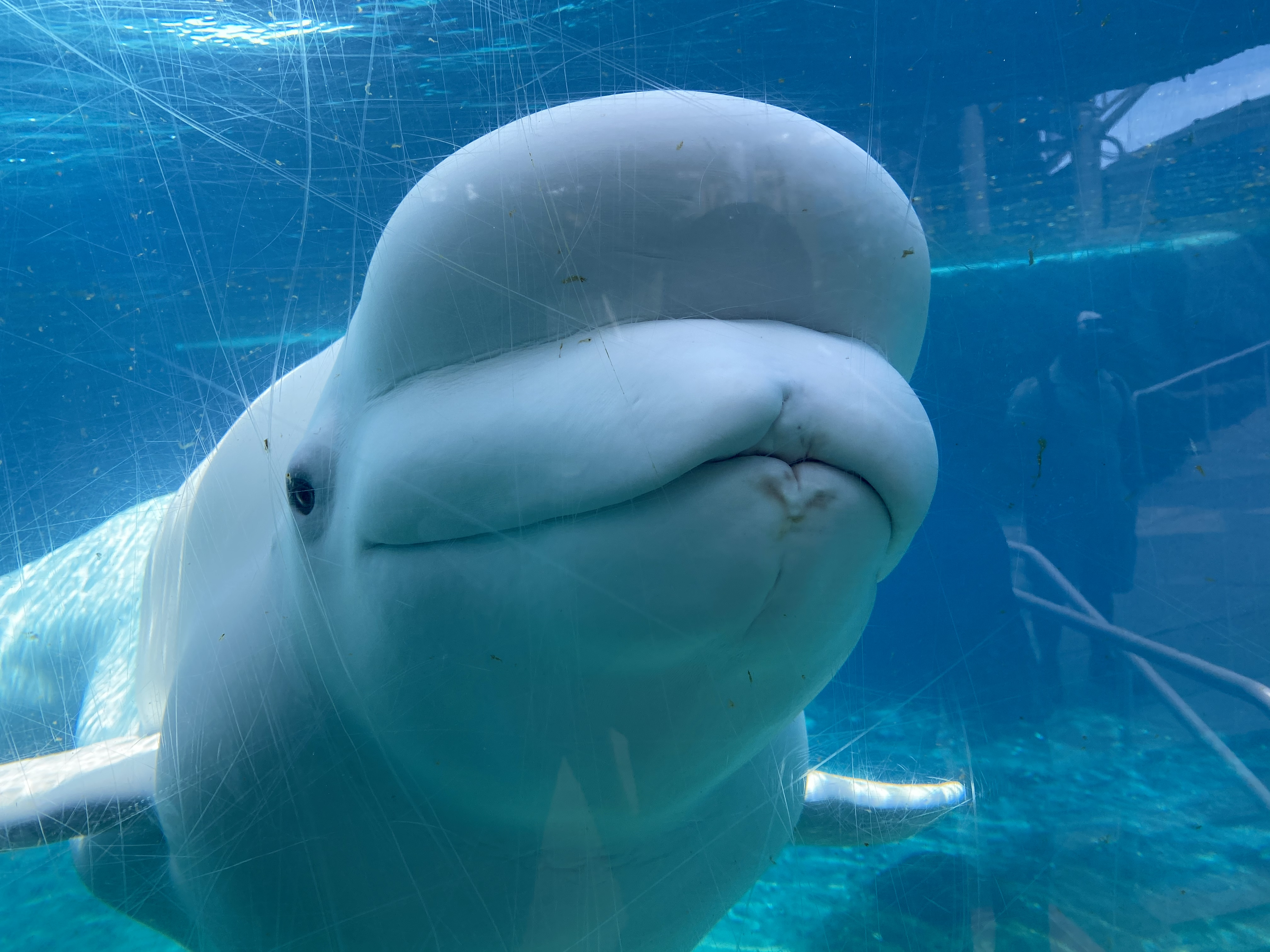
- Species: Beluga whale
- Born: July 6, 2002 (age 24); Marineland of Canada
- Residence: Mystic Aquarium

Juno (born July 6, 2002) is a beluga whale at Mystic Aquarium who gained popularity for posing for pictures and for the several viral videos including him. Juno can be distinguished from the other belugas at Mystic by the gray markings on his dorsal ridge.

== Background ==
Juno was transferred to Mystic in Connecticut from SeaWorld Orlando on a breeding loan in 2010.

In 2015, Juno photobombed a press conference of then Governor Dannel Malloy.

In 2023, the staff of Mystic baked a cake for Juno, commemorating his 21st birthday. The cake was made of blue and green whale-safe Jell-O.

== Viral videos ==
In July 2011, Juno was seen in a viral video bobbing his head and swaying his head to the mariachi music played by Los Trovadores de America at a wedding. A senior trainer at Mystic said Juno was trained to bob in response to certain arm movements and Juno was responding to the arm movements of the band's lead guitar player. The video has been viewed over 4 million times. The aquarium responded by inviting the band for a "Cocktails with the Whales" night, which happened a month after the video was taken.

In August 2012, Juno was seen mesmerized by Scott Fischer's art when he puts it up to the glass of the tank in a viral video with over 320,000 views.

In August 2014, Juno was seen playing with three children, giving them a side eye, and making a sound described as joyful. The parents of the children met through a fatty oxidation disorder support group. The video was posted a year before it went viral on Mystic's Facebook group. The video was viewed over 1 million times.

During the closure of Mystic due to the COVID-19 pandemic, Mystic invited local musician Israel Malek to play for the beluga whales. In the video, Malek is seen playing "Every Little Thing Is Going to Be Alright" on the perch of the beluga whale tank while Juno watches.

== Make-A-Wish ==
In 2021, Make-A-Wish and Mystic surprised a teenaged girl by letting her touch Juno. The girl was blind and has a rare medical condition. Her first wish was to swim with dolphins or meet Dr. Pol. After her first wish didn't work out, she choose a second wish, to have a special at-home pool made for her condition. Because of the delays due to the COVID-19 pandemic Make-A-Wish and Mystic organized the aforementioned surprise encounter with Juno to lift her spirits. The girl was the first person to touch Juno in a year.

== See also ==
- List of individual cetaceans
