= Kiska (orca) =

Captive orca at Marineland of Canada (died 2023)

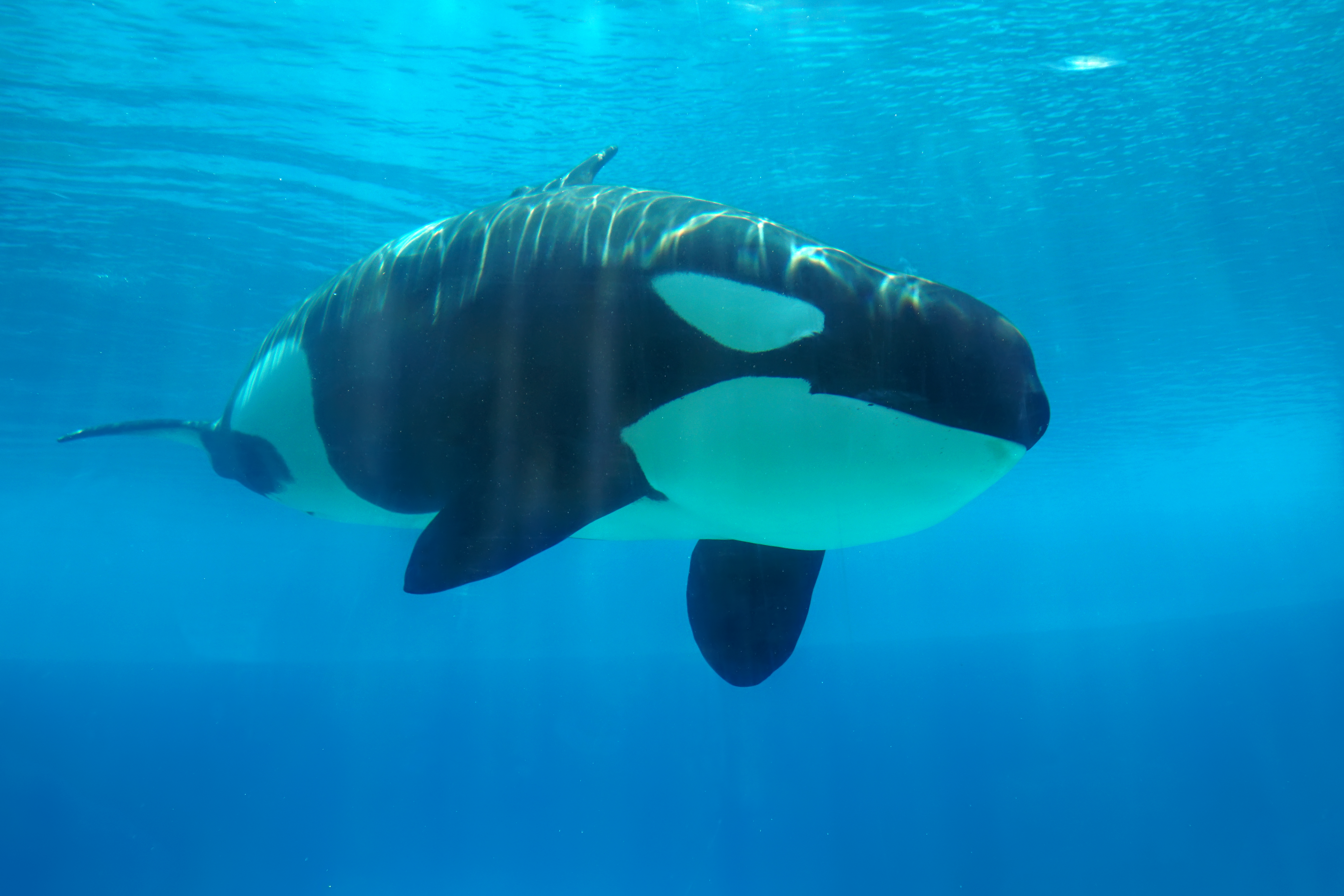
Kiska in 2017

Kiska (died March 9, 2023) was a captive orca housed at Marineland of Canada. She was nicknamed the World's Loneliest Orca because she spent the last 12 years of her life completely alone. Kiska was the last captive orca to be held in Canada as a result of the Ending the Captivity of Whales and Dolphins Act.

== Life ==
Kiska was captured in 1979 in the waters surrounding Iceland. She was kept alongside Keiko, who portrayed the fictional orca Willy in the 1993 film Free Willy. The two remained in the same tank at Marineland for several years, until Keiko was sold to an aquarium. Kiska performed in shows at Marineland until about 10 years before her death.

The tank used by Marineland for Kiska was an estimated 40 metres (130 ft) x 20 metres (66 ft) wide. Kiska would travel the perimeter of her tank 879 times daily; the total distance of these laps would be approximately 100 km (the minimum distance most wild orca pods travel per day). Kiska developed ritualistic, repetitive behaviours that indicate stress and are abnormal for wild orcas such as floating motionless in a single spot. Before Kiska was kept alone, she shared the tank with Keiko, Kandu VII, Junior, Ikaika, and her five calves. All of Kiska's calves were fathered by Kandu VII, none of which survived past six years of age. Her first calf went unnamed but the others were known as Kanuck, Nova, Hudson, and Athena. Kiska lived alone in her tank from 2011 onward after the leave of Ikaika. A 2012 report stated that Marineland was then looking for a companion for their orca.

The Ending the Captivity of Whales and Dolphins Act banned the capture and keeping of cetaceans in Canada, though Kiska was kept in captivity due to a grandfather clause. She died on March 9, 2023, around the age of 47. Marineland stated its opposition to moving Kiska, preferring to import "an age-appropriate companion", not allowed under the Ontario law.

== See also ==
- List of individual cetaceans
- List of captive orcas
- Legal status of animals in Canada
