= Mystic Aquarium =

Aquarium in Mystic, Connecticut, US

- Mystic Aquarium logo
- Interactive map of Mystic Aquarium
- 41°22′25″N 71°57′10″W
- Date opened: October 6, 1973
- Location: Mystic, Connecticut, United States
- No. of animals: 10,000
- Memberships: AZA, AMMPA
- Website: www.mysticaquarium.org

Mystic Aquarium is a marine aquarium in Mystic, Connecticut. It is one of only three U.S. facilities holding Steller sea lions, and it has the only beluga whales in New England. Special exhibits include the largest outdoor beluga whale habitat in the United States, a ray and shark touch pool, an African penguin exhibit, a jelly gallery, and the new World of Wonders (W.O.W.) exhibit The aquarium is a member of the Alliance of Marine Mammal Parks and Aquariums (AMMPA) and is an accredited member of the Association of Zoos and Aquariums (AZA). It is a subsidiary of the Sea Research Foundation, Inc.

== History ==
Juno the beluga whale at Mystic Aquarium

Mystic Aquarium was first opened in 1973 as a privately owned corporation. Industrialist and philanthropist Kelvin Smith was the primary shareholder; he chose Mystic, Connecticut as the site because of the area's scenic shoreline and rich maritime history. In 1999, the aquarium and Ballard's Institute for Exploration combined to form a $52 million expansion. The expansion features the Arctic Coast, a 1-acre (4,000 m^{2}) outdoor beluga whale display containing 760,000-US-gallon (2,900,000 L) of water.

The aquarium hosted several marine mammals from the Shedd Aquarium while it was undergoing renovation to its marine mammal habitat between September 2008 and May 2009. The National Geographic Society's Crittercam exhibit was set up at the aquarium in February 2011 but has since been removed.

In 2012, Mystic Aquarium opened the Ocean Exploration Center featuring maps, diagrams, and models from Dr. Robert Ballard's explorations of the Black Sea and of the wreck of the RMS Titanic. Presentations in the Nautilus Live Theater told more of Ballard's recent explorations and the ship E/V Nautilus. Audience members had a live link to crew members on the ship at sea and could ask them questions directly. The aquarium opened Titanic – 12,450 Feet Below on April 12, 2012 to commemorate the 100th anniversary of the sinking of the RMS Titanic. The exhibit was created by Ballard, who found the Titanic in 1985, and Tim Delaney, a former Walt Disney Imagineer. It was funded by a $1 million donation from United Technologies Corporation. After being open to the public for over three and a half years the exhibit came to a close in January 2015.

The aquarium was presented with the National Medal for Museum and Library Service in 2014. The award was accepted by Sea Research Foundation's president Stephen M. Coan. The Titanic exhibit has since been remodeled into multiple exhibits, including Exploration: Wild, Jurassic Giants, Dino Seas: An Immersive Journey, and the current exhibit, World of Wonders (W.O.W.).

== Animals ==
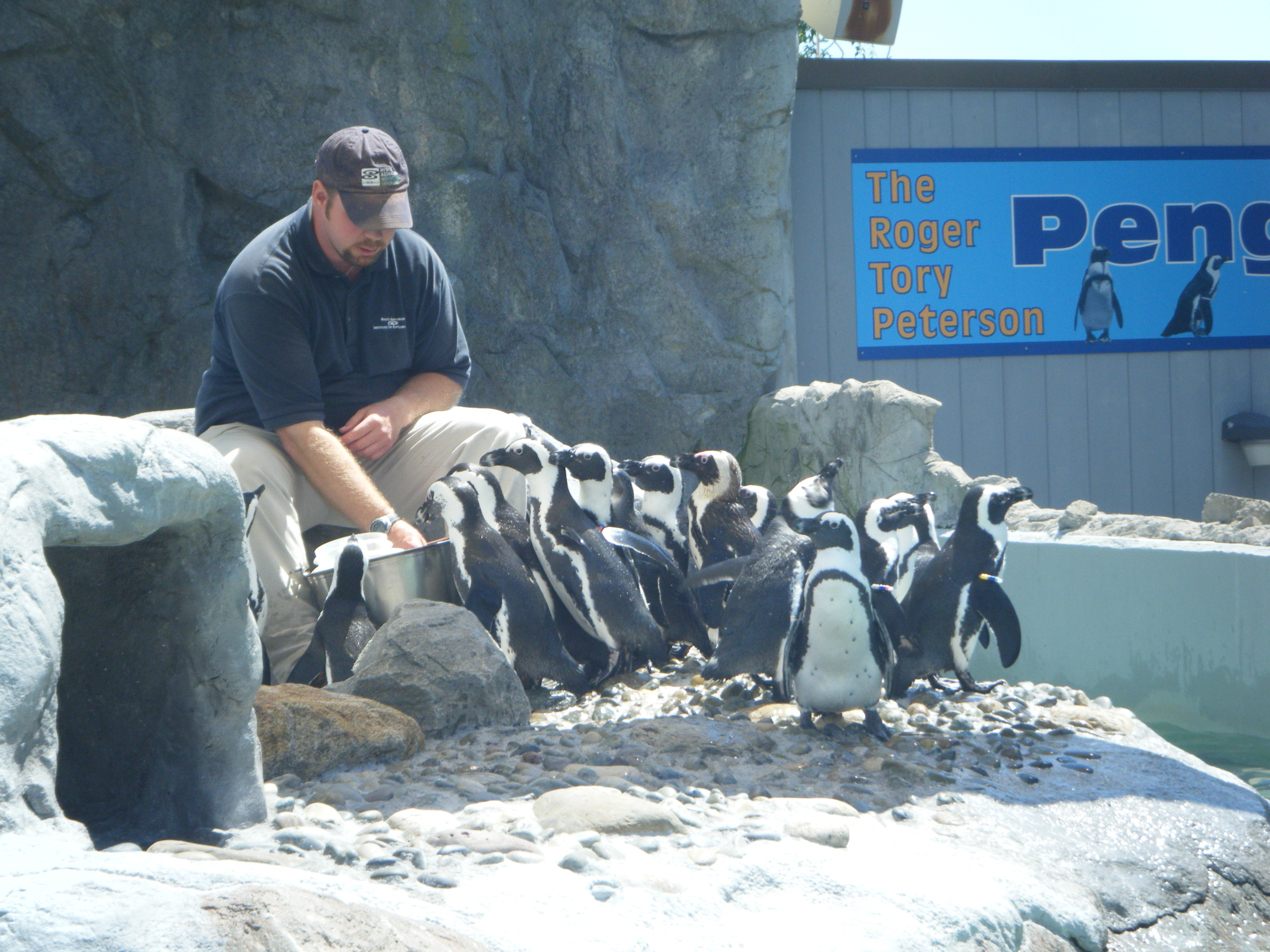
Penguin feeding

Mystic Aquarium holds six beluga whales (Juno, Natasha, Kela, Nunavik and two more), two Steller sea lions, six northern fur seals (only one of three facilities to hold them), five California sea lions, one Pacific and seven Atlantic harbor seals, two Arctic spotted seals, a large colony of 34 African penguins, unicorn fish, blue tang, octopus, Japanese spider crabs, sand tiger sharks, bamboo sharks, sea turtle, clownfish, an extensive sea jelly exhibit, seasonal birds, and other oceanic creatures. It is among the first aquariums to attempt artificial insemination of a beluga whale as part of its conservation work, in order to increase breeding in human care.

Within the aquarium, encounter programs are offered to visitors for an additional fee, who can get close to the African penguins, touch bamboo sharks, and feed and touch sting rays in a special pool.

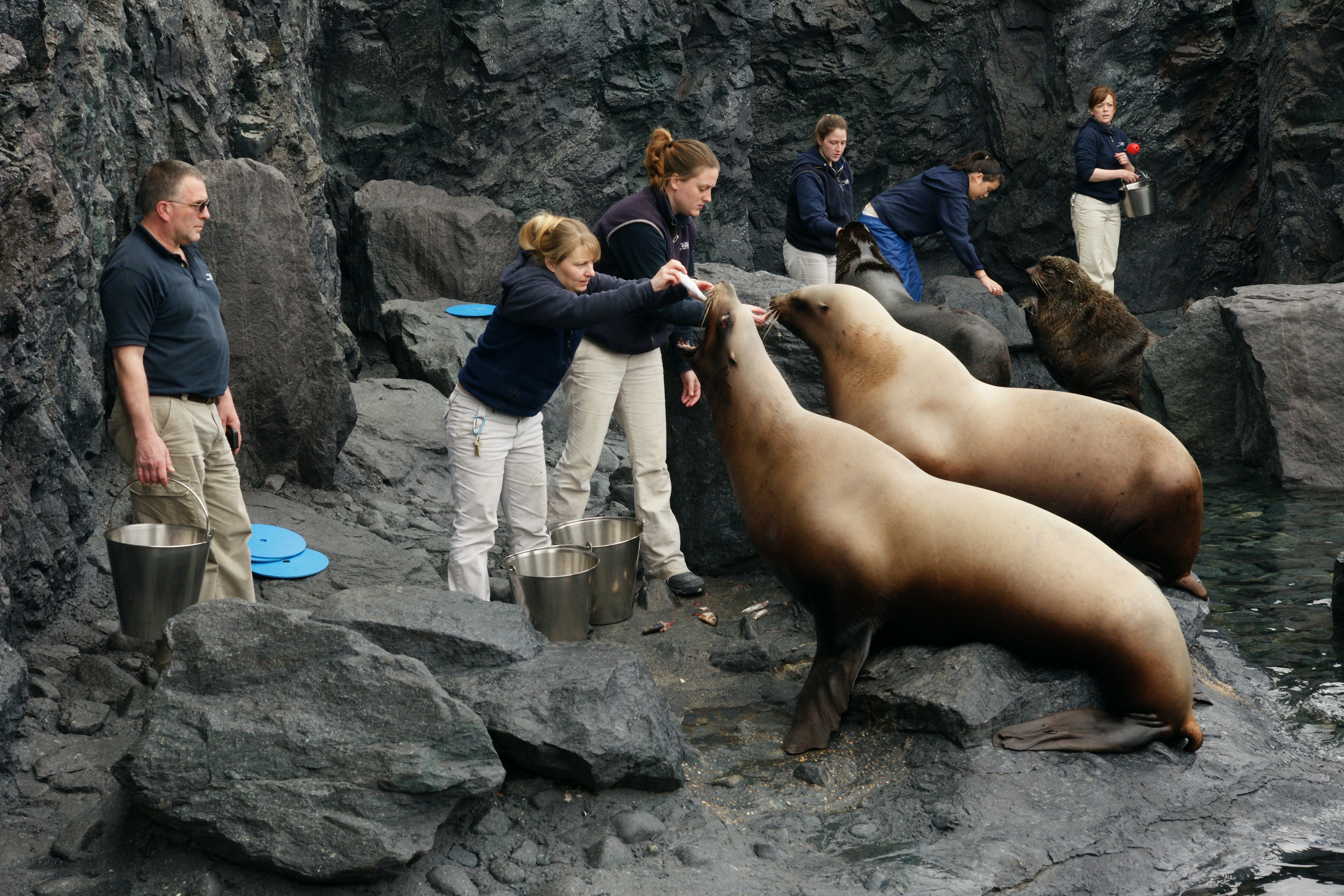
Staff feeding sea lions at the Pacific Northwest portion of the aquarium

== Beluga whale deaths controversy ==
Two beluga whales died in the aquarium within a year. The aquarium imported five individuals of the species from Marineland in Canada in May 2021 despite outcries from animal rights groups and a lawsuit. A few months later, in August 2021, five-year-old Havok died while being treated for gastrointestinal issues. After Havok’s death, the US Department of Agriculture conducted a focused inspection of the aquarium and found three critical violations involving Havok’s veterinary care, his handling, and the facilities. The report found that the aquarium failed to provide adequate veterinary care in the last eight hours of Havok’s life.

Six-year-old Havana died in February 2022. An examination later showed numerous significant lesions indicating storage disease in the whale’s brain and spinal cord and acute cardiac failure.

Mystic Aquarium noted a common factor in the locations from which the whales originated. They stated that their research team in Canada was collaborating with a contracted veterinarian to assist Marineland, the facility of origin, in closely examining the beluga whale population there.
