= Dragon Mountain =

Amusement ride

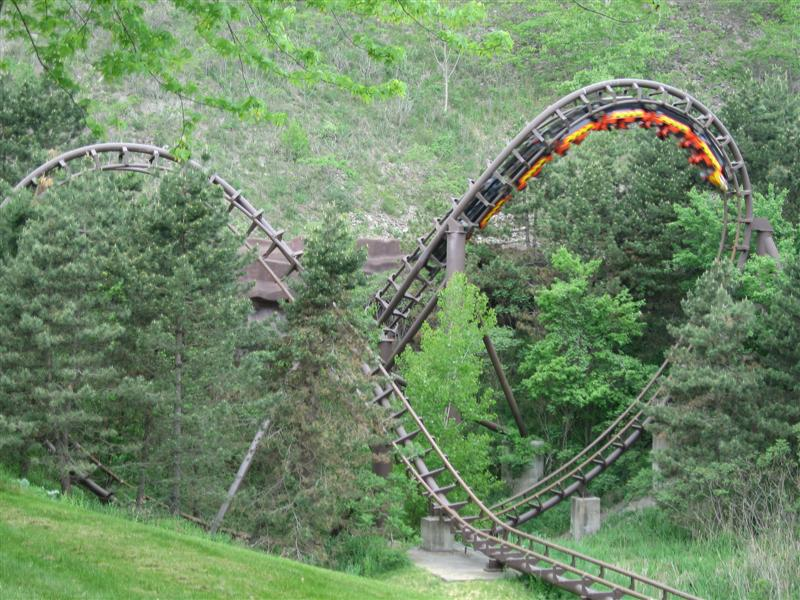
- The Bowtie element on Dragon Mountain

Marineland of Canada
- Location: Marineland of Canada
- Coordinates: 43.061265°N 79.080379°W
- Status: Closed
- Opening date: July 16, 1983
- Cost: CA$9 million

General statistics
- Type: Steel
- Manufacturer: Arrow Huss
- Designer: Ron Toomer
- Model: Custom Looping Coaster
- Track layout: Terrain
- Lift/launch system: Chain lift hill
- Height: 186 ft (57 m)
- Length: 5,500 ft (1,700 m)
- Speed: 50 mph (80 km/h)
- Inversions: 4
- Duration: 3:30
- Height restriction: 48 in (122 cm)
- Trains: 3 trains with 7 cars; riders arranged 2 across in 2 rows for a total of 28 riders per train
- Dragon Mountain at RCDB

Dragon Mountain was a steel roller coaster located at Marineland of Canada near Niagara Falls, Ontario. Built by Arrow Huss, it opened to the public on July 16, 1983. At its opening, it claimed to have the longest ride time of 3 minutes and 30 seconds and the longest track length of 5,500 feet (1,700 m), though both of these statistics were exceeded by The Beast four years earlier.

Dragon Mountain reaches a maximum elevation of 186 feet (57 m), which is considered the total difference in height experienced throughout the course of the ride, as the roller coaster's support structure follows closely to the terrain. The ride covers 30 acres (12 ha) of land and claimed to be the "world's largest" roller coaster on that basis; however, The Beast at Kings Island opened four years earlier and travels across 36 acres (15 ha) of land, meaning that Dragon Mountain never actually held that record.

Upon the opening in the early 80s, the ride was missing the proposed volcano facade around the helix, and the miniature waterfalls built around the stretch of track after exiting the first tunnel. These unthemed parts of the ride had nothing but the framework, which was constructed along with the track. In 2006, Marineland decided to complete the volcano to improve the ride's appearance.

== Ride experience ==
The riders are first welcomed at the base of the mountain by a long path. At the end of the path lies the dragon's cave, which is carved to look like an actual dragon's head. The queue and station inside are almost in complete darkness. The station, however, is lit up more than the queue, because it would make operating the ride extremely difficult for the ride operators and attendants. Upon exiting the station, the riders are brought back outside climbing up the lush-green hill. Throughout most of the ride, the track follows the terrain closely.
