= Žice =

- Location in Slovenia
- Coordinates: 46°37′25.6″N 15°50′48.18″E
- Country: Slovenia
- Traditional region: Styria
- Statistical region: Drava
- Municipality: Sveta Ana

Area
  - Total: 4.35 km^{2} (1.68 sq mi)
- Elevation: 260.6 m (855 ft)

Population (2002)
  - Total: 270

Žice (pronounced [ˈʒiːtsɛ]; German: Schützen) is a dispersed settlement in the Municipality of Sveta Ana in the Slovene Hills in northeastern Slovenia.
