= Marineland of Canada =

Closed theme park in Niagara Falls, Ontario

- Previously known as Marine Wonderland and Animal Farm; Marineland and Game Farm

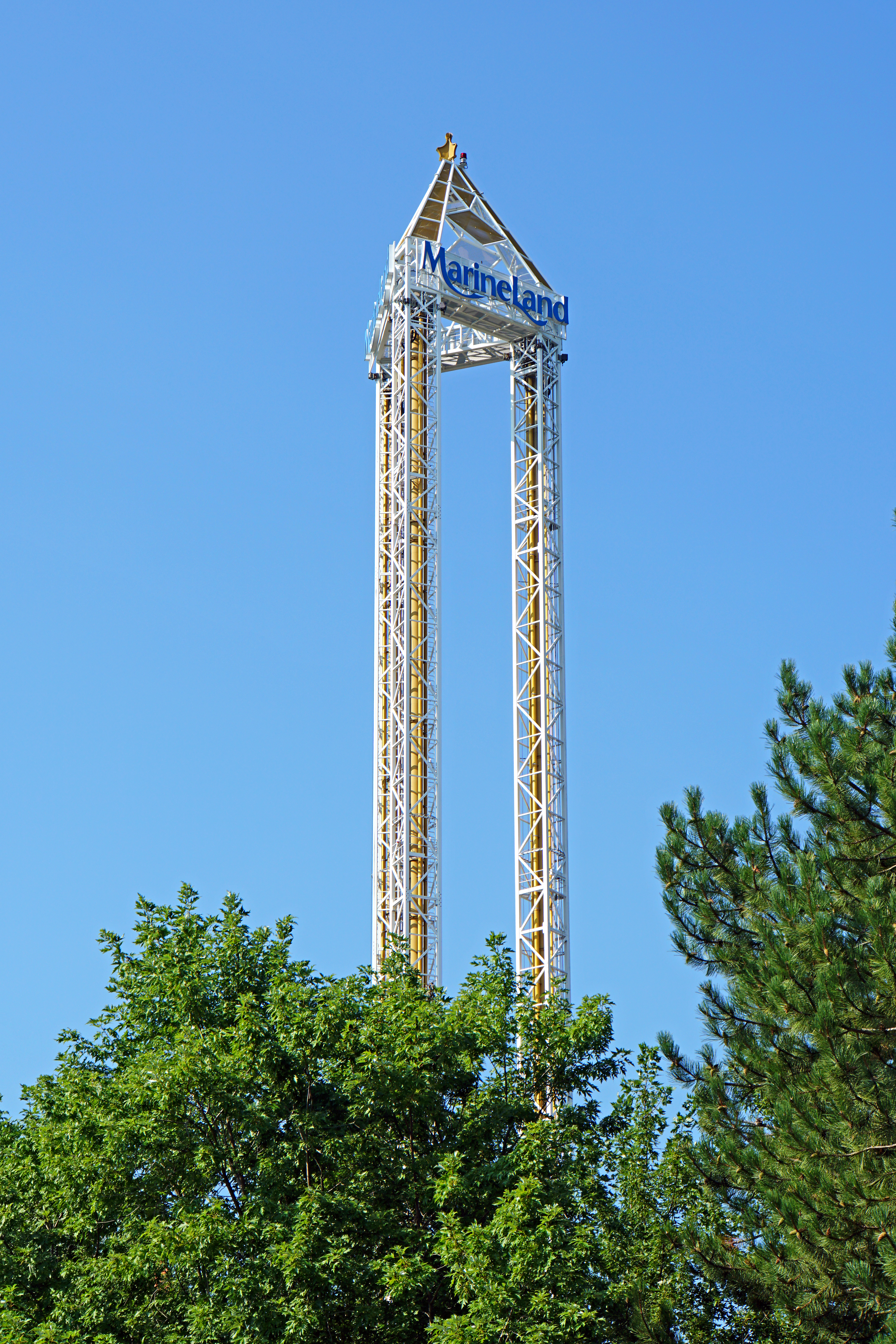
- Sky Screamer, 2017
- Interactive map of Marineland of Canada
- Location: 7657 Portage Road; Niagara Falls, Ontario; L2E 6X8
- Coordinates: 43°03′56″N 79°04′21″W
- Status: Defunct
- Opened: 1961; 65 years ago
- Closed: September 1, 2024; 2 years ago
- Owner: John Holer (1961–2018); Holer Family Amusements (2018–2024)
- Slogan: Everyone Loves Marineland!
- Operating season: May–October

Attractions
- Total: 2
- Roller coasters: 1

Marineland of Canada (often shortened to Marineland) was an animal theme park and aquarium located in Niagara Falls, Ontario, Canada. Founded in 1961 by John Holer, it featured performing marine mammals, exhibits of marine and land animals, and amusement rides. The marine mammals included dolphins, sea lions, beluga whales, walruses, and orcas. Over the years, Marineland faced numerous protests and lawsuits regarding alleged mistreatment of its animals.

Following a heavily downscaled final season with no rides operating and significantly reduced admission costs, Marineland permanently closed to the public in September 2024. The park later began relocating its animals and auctioning off its rides. In 2026, an international relocation effort was undertaken to move its remaining 30 beluga whales and four dolphins to aquariums in the United States and Spain. On August 31, Marineland began transferring its final six belugas, with two destined for the Shedd Aquarium in Chicago and four for SeaWorld San Antonio in Texas. Once completed, the transfers meant that Canada no longer had any whales in captivity. The six transfers formed the final stage of the operation involving five aquariums, described as the largest collective relocation of captive whales.

== Facility ==
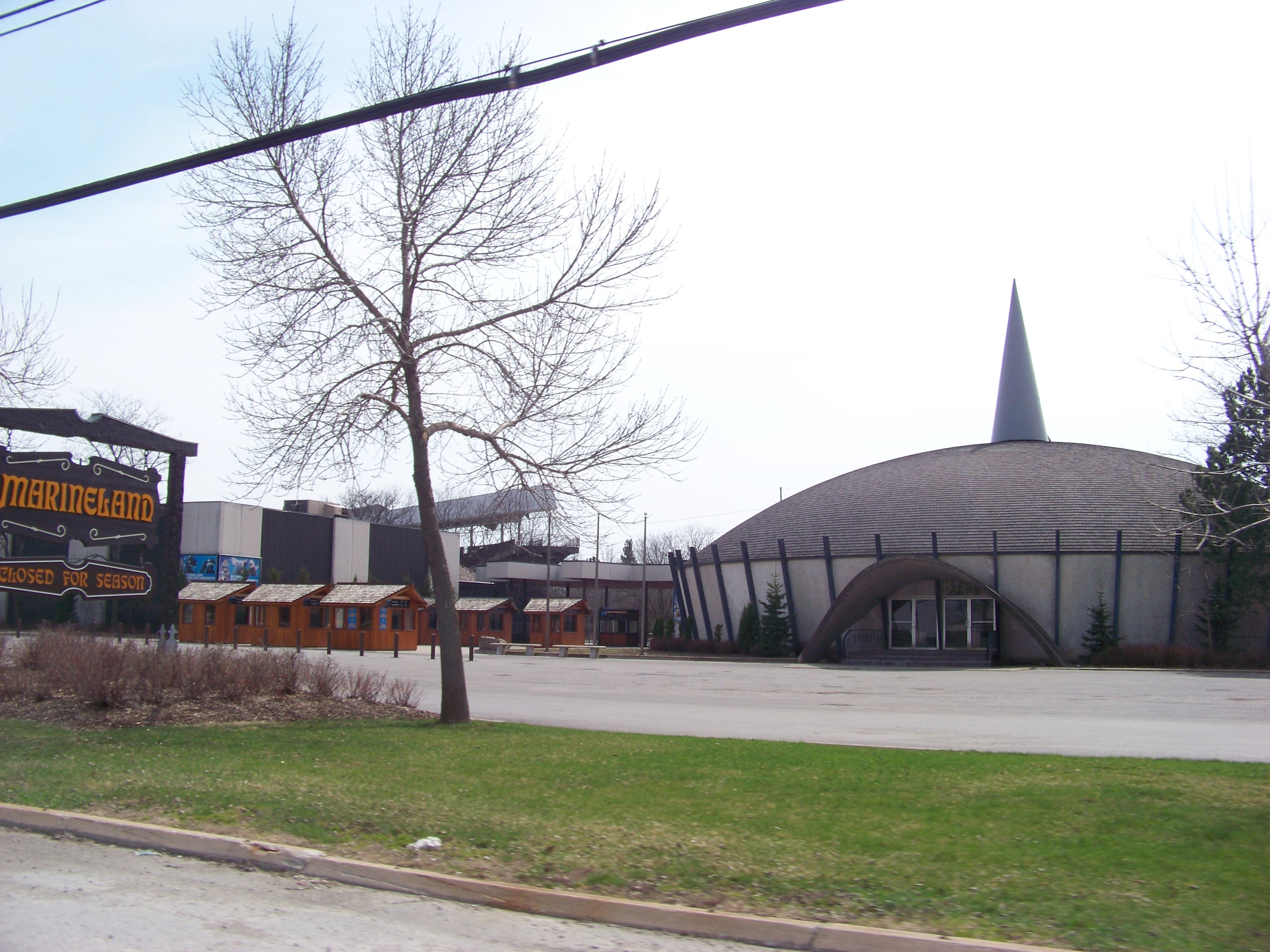
Marineland entrance, 2007

As of 2018, Marineland housed approximately 4,000 land and marine animals and operated 19 theme park attractions. The park did not publicly disclose its annual attendance figures. Published amounts range from an estimated 250,000 to 500,000 people annually. Marineland was once a member of Canada's Accredited Zoos and Aquariums (CAZA), but voluntarily withdrew from CAZA in May 2017, stating it was expanding the area for animals and "will be continuing to work with CAZA to ensure that the expansion is successfully harmonized with CAZA principles".

In 2020, the park did not open in spring as planned because of the restrictions required by the COVID-19 pandemic. The facility remained closed due to restrictions placed by the Government of Ontario. Marineland reopened for its 2022 season.

Following the death of John Holer in 2018, his widow, Marie Holer, took ownership of the park until her own death on September 6, 2024. The park has been for sale since at least 2023. All of the rides present in the park were closed as well as some of the exhibits featuring animals. In 2024, the park was only open for two months with a significant portion of the park remaining closed and admission being sold at reduced rates. The park did not open for the 2025 season.

=== Marine exhibits ===
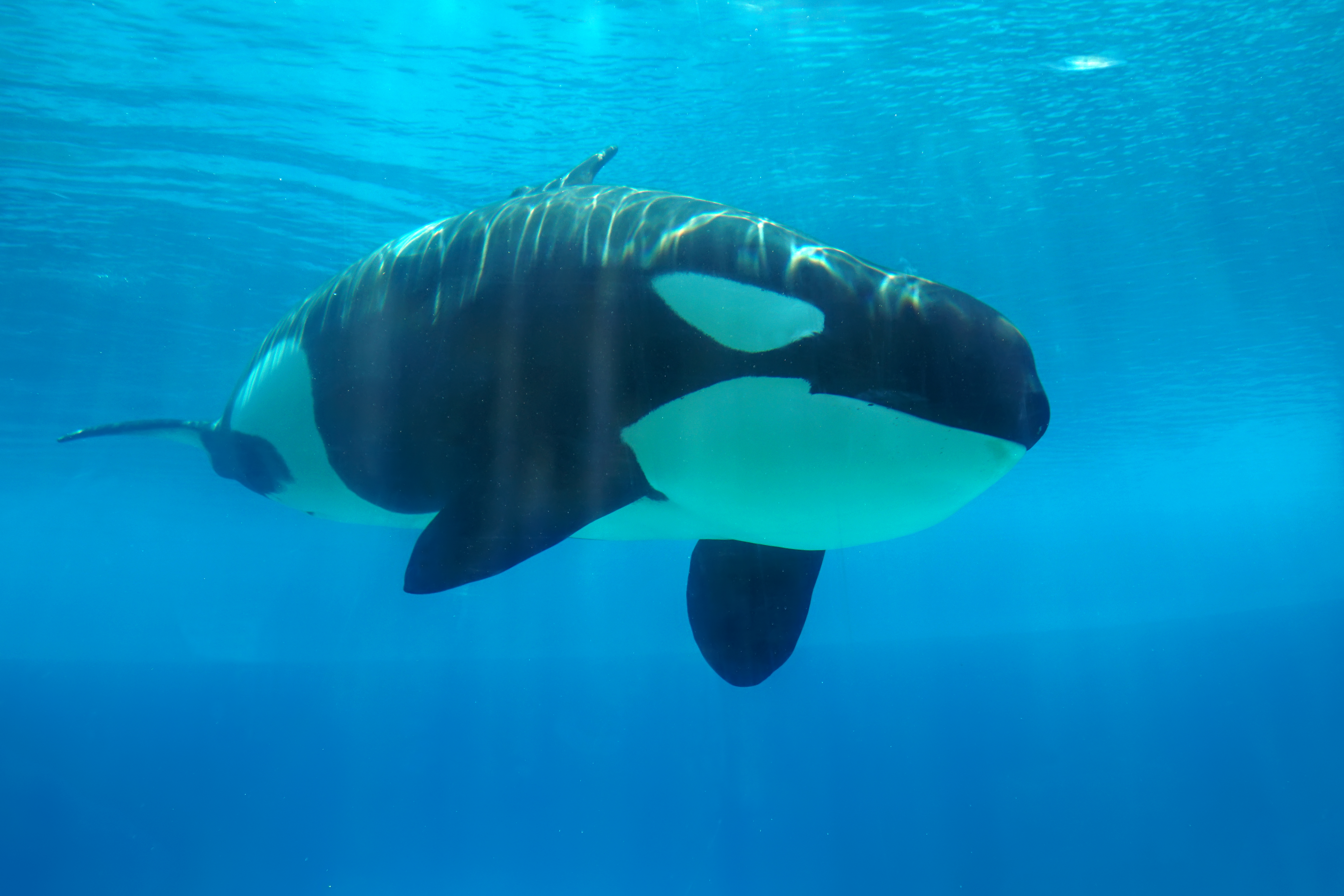
Kiska the orca at Marineland, 2017

Marineland housed beluga whales, bottlenose dolphins and, until 2023, orcas. Its marine mammals were kept in several facilities, including Arctic Cove, Friendship Cove and King Waldorf Stadium. The park's final orca, Kiska, died in March 2023, leaving Marineland without an orca for the first time since 1979.

After the park closed to the public following the 2024 season, its remaining marine mammals continued to be cared for at the property while Marineland sought new homes for them. Marineland reached an agreement to transfer its remaining belugas and dolphins to Chimelong Ocean Kingdom in China, but the federal government rejected the proposed export of the belugas. Fisheries Minister Joanne Thompson said the transfer was not in the whales' best interests because China did not have comparable restrictions on breeding and performances. Marineland subsequently said that it was running out of money to care for the whales and warned that they could be euthanized unless another solution or emergency federal funding was found.

A consortium of aquariums subsequently arranged to relocate the animals to facilities in the United States and Spain. The relocation began in July 2026. On July 21, four belugas—Acadia, Osiris, Sierra and Lillooet—were transferred to the Shedd Aquarium in Chicago, while Bertie Botts and Frankie were transferred to SeaWorld San Antonio in Texas. Seven additional belugas were transferred to SeaWorld San Antonio on August 4.

A further group left Marineland in August. Four belugas—Caspian, Peekachu, Secord and Rain—were transferred to the Shedd Aquarium, while Zephyr and Balor were transferred to the Georgia Aquarium in Atlanta. Three males—Xavier, Cyprus and Jasper—subsequently arrived at SeaWorld San Diego in California on August 23.

Peekachu died at the Shedd Aquarium on August 25, less than two weeks after her transfer from Marineland. The aquarium said blood tests indicated that she had been severely dehydrated.

On August 26, Marineland began transferring its four remaining bottlenose dolphins—Echo, Lida, Marina and Tsunami—and two belugas, Cleopatra and Jelly Bean, to L'Oceanogràfic in Valencia, Spain. On August 31, the final six belugas began leaving Marineland. Two were destined for the Shedd Aquarium and four for SeaWorld San Antonio. Completion of the transfers would end the keeping of captive whales in Canada. Rain died in early September at the Shedd Aquarium, Jelly Bean died "suddenly and unexpectedly" at L'Oceanogràfic in mid-September, and Osiris also died at the Shedd Aquarium the following week.

=== Land animals ===
In addition to marine animals, Marineland featured land animals, including black bears, deer, elk, and bison. In 2023, Marineland faced charges from the province of Ontario for providing inadequate care to its black bears under the Ontario Animal Welfare Services Act. Marineland was ordered to pay $85,000 in 2024 after failing to improve conditions for three young black bears. Provincial inspectors found that the bears had inadequate access to water, were kept in unsuitable enclosures and were unable to fulfil their psychological needs.

As Marineland wound down its operations, it began removing its land animals. A dozen black bears were transferred to an animal sanctuary in Colorado in the spring of 2026. The park's bison herd was also relocated, as were its penguins. Several hundred deer remained on the Marineland property as of August 31, 2026.

=== Rides ===
This is the more recent list of rides that Marineland possessed, including a pair of roller coasters and a large launched free fall. As Marineland has put them up for sale, it may no longer possess them. As of 2026, There were several defunct rides that have not been maintained.

Ride	Manufacturer	Model	Year	Description
Boat Carousel	Mack Rides	Wikingefahrt	1982	Carousel composed of ornate boats.
Bumble Bee	HUSS	Troika	2006	Spinning flat ride with bee-shaped vehicles.
Dragon Mountain	Arrow HUSS	Custom Looping Coaster	1983	Opened as the world's largest non-stop roller coasters by area, covering 30 acres (1,300,000 sq ft). It features tunnels that lead to the queue area, has two consecutive vertical loops and a bow tie loop. A section of the roller coaster passes through a back section of Marineland left unfinished.
Eagle Tower	Zierer	Family Freefall Tower	2022	Miniature drop tower.
Flying Dragon	Zierer	Magic Carpet	1983	A flat ride that raises and drops riders in a circular motion.
Hurricane Cove	Mack Rides	Sea Storm	1983	A flat ride with boat-shaped cars that travel around a central point. Closed in 2022.
Kandu's Twister	Mack Rides	Tea Cups	2002	A classic tea cups-style ride with vehicles with orcas on them.
Lady Bug Coaster	Zierer	Tivoli	1979	Small family roller coaster with a series of turns. Originally known as Tivoli Coaster.
Magic Experience	HUSS	Magic	1991	A spinning flat ride with a large black bear perched atop the centre.
Ocean Odyssey	Zierer	Flying Gondolas	2010	Rotating flat ride themed to a giant purple octopus with 12 fish-shaped vehicles.
Orca Screamer	Zierer	Family Freefall Tower	2006	Miniature drop tower.
Sky Hawk	HUSS	Condor	1989	Spinning ride that lifts riders up to a high height.
Sky Screamer	S&S - Sansei Technologies	Space Shot	2004	300 feet (91 m) high launched free fall situated on a 150-foot-tall (46 m) hill, making the total height of the ride 450 feet (140 m). Ascending riders experience 4Gs, while descending riders experience a -2Gs.
Space Avenger	Zamperla	Flying Gondolas	1990	Circular flat ride that allows passengers to control a spaceship. Closed in 2019 and replaced by Eagle Tower.
Star Voyager	Zierer	Star Shape	2022	92 feet (28 m) tall rotating mast with fully rotating gondolas.
Tivoli Wheel	Zierer	Ferris Wheel	1979	Small Ferris Wheel with 8 arms.
Topple Tower	HUSS	Topple Tower	2007	The topple tower suffered extensive self-inflicted damage to its support structure, and last operated in 2011. It never re-opened and sat vacant. Replaced by Star Voyager.
Viking Adventure	Zierer	Kontiki	2006	Spinning flat ride that rocks back-and-forth.
Wave Swinger	Zierer	Chairswing	1983	Classic spinning swings ride.

== History ==
A 1967 flyer for Marineland and Game Farm

=== Founding and early years ===
The park was founded by John Holer, a Slovenian immigrant who had worked in circuses in Europe. Holer was born Ivan Holerjam in Slovenia in 1935, when the country was part of Yugoslavia. His family operated a vineyard, but lost the property through government expropriation after the establishment of Communist rule. Holer studied wine chemistry, worked at a winery in Austria and briefly worked with animals at Circus Krone in Munich before emigrating to Canada in 1957. He settled in the Niagara Region, where he worked several jobs, including at a Canada Steamship Lines dry dock.

Holer and several engineers designed an amusement ride and sold the plans to Disney. Holer used the proceeds in 1961 to buy a small portion of the Harry Oakes estate upriver from Horseshoe Falls. He borrowed money to purchase two steel tanks, welded them together and acquired three performing sea lions from California.

The park opened in 1961 as Marine Wonderland and Animal Farm. Holer welded two large steel tanks together and brought in three sea lions and charged one quarter for admission and another to feed the animals. The attraction also featured an underwater show featuring two female swimmers. In 1963, a trained sea lion "Jeff" escaped from Marine Wonderland and made it to the Niagara River and went over the falls. Holer offered a CA$50 reward and organized a helicopter search. The seal was recaptured by Holer a few days later in Queenston, where it was found sunning itself with teenager Tommy Haines, who was given the reward. In 1964, Holer added two dolphins, along with a few other animals and the attraction became known as Marineland and Game Farm. By 1966, a 2,000-seat "aquatheatre" was completed along with a "grotto" of aquariums and shops. The grotto in the new Aquarium Dome contained eight tanks used to display fresh-water fish. The park became a popular family attraction and recorded an annual attendance of 250,000 for the 1967 season. In 1968, the park added alligators. Neighbouring attraction "Niagara Falls Indian Village" closed down after the 1968 season and Marineland purchased their property.

=== Orcas and expansion in the 1970s ===
In 1971, Marineland added orcas. Kandu became the park's major attraction. In 1973, the aquarium purchased Kandy, a 4,000-pound (1,800 kg) female orca captured off Vancouver Island in 1973, to mate with Kandu, but she died later that year. Kandu lived until 1979 and was replaced by Nootka, captured and brought to the park in 1981. Nootka lived until 2008. By 1975, the park kept over 1,000 animals and claimed to be Niagara Falls' "most popular attraction after the falls." In 1975, Marineland became involved in a controversy over another orca captured off Vancouver Island. The capture of Kanduke by the Sealand of the Pacific aquarium of Victoria, British Columbia, for purchase by Marineland was blocked by the Government of British Columbia, at the instigation of Greenpeace activists. Claimed to be property by the BC government and resources by the Government of Canada, the orca eventually was transported to Marineland after it was determined that orcas were a resource under the control of the Canadian government. The incident led to the ending of the capture of orcas in British Columbia waters.

=== Major amusement-park development ===
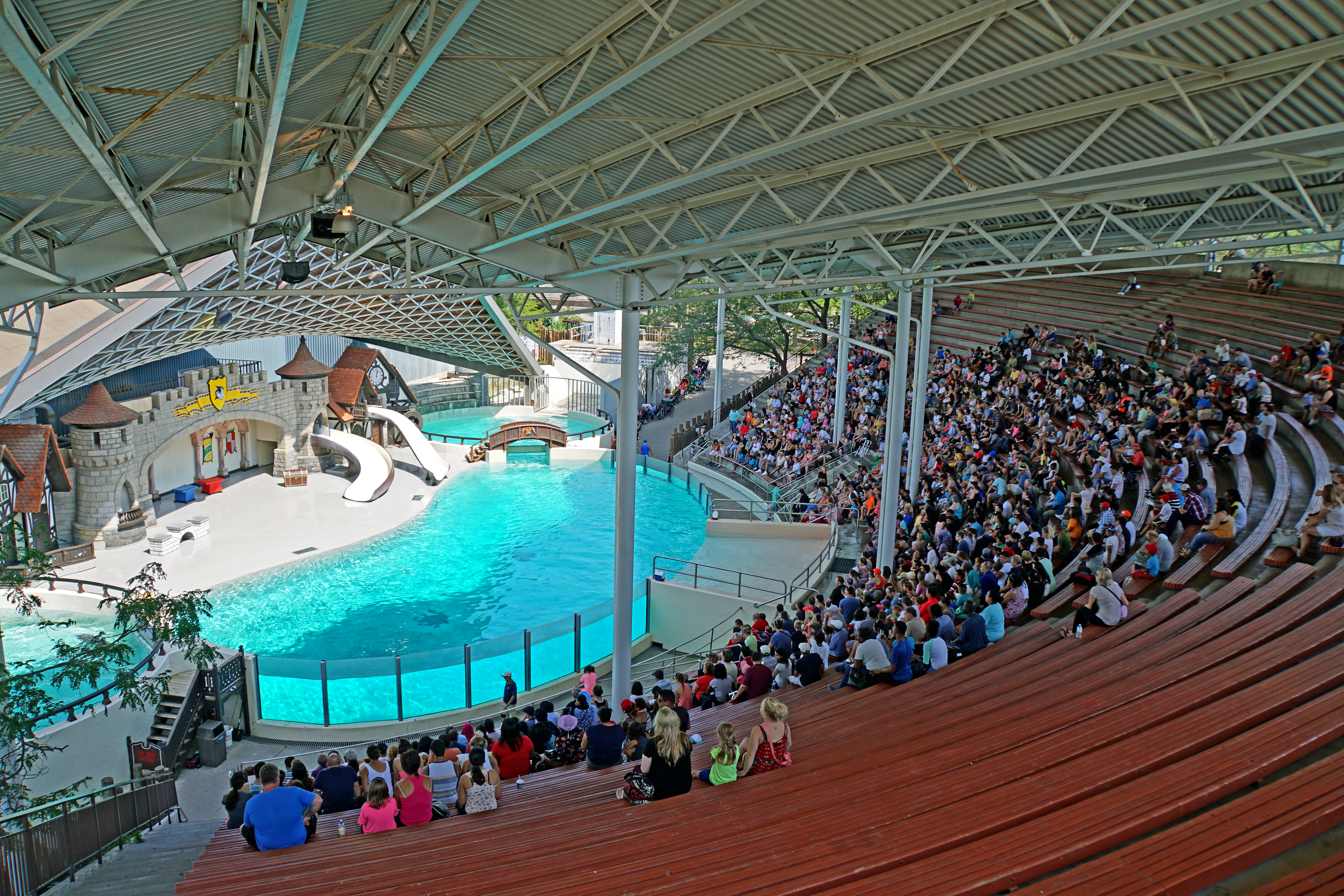
King Waldorf Stadium, built in 1976

In 1976, Marineland announced a CA$50 million expansion on 1,000 adjacent acres, to include a 400-acre "safari park" and amusement centre. Construction began on a new 15,000-seat stadium and pool for killer whales. Marineland purchased two locomotives for a steam train railroad. When plans for Canada's Wonderland were announced, Holer decided to further increase the park's expansion plans, adding a Gothic castle, canals and the world's largest roller coaster, for a total cost of CA$80 million. The "Dragon Mountain" roller coaster opened in 1983 along with other rides. At a cost of CA$9 million, the roller coaster opened without CA$3 million reproductions of the American and Horseshoe falls, postponed to the future. In 1984, Holer announced the postponement of part of the expansion, citing an 86% increase in municipal property taxes, and threatened to move the facility across the river to the United States.

=== Keiko ===
In 1982, Marineland purchased Keiko, a killer whale, from an aquarium in Hafnarfjörður, Iceland. Keiko started performing for the public and developed skin lesions indicative of poor health. He was then sold for $350,000 to Reino Aventura (now named Six Flags México), an amusement park in Mexico City, in 1985. Keiko was the star of the movie Free Willy in 1993. After spending 1996–1998 at Oregon Coast Aquarium, Keiko was returned to a sea pen in Iceland and was released to the ocean in July 2002. He swam to Norway, eventually settling in the Taknes fjord in November 2002, where he was not catching fish and had little contact with wild Orcas; until his death, Keiko was fed daily by the Keiko Project group. Keiko died of pneumonia in December 2003.

=== Walruses and belugas ===
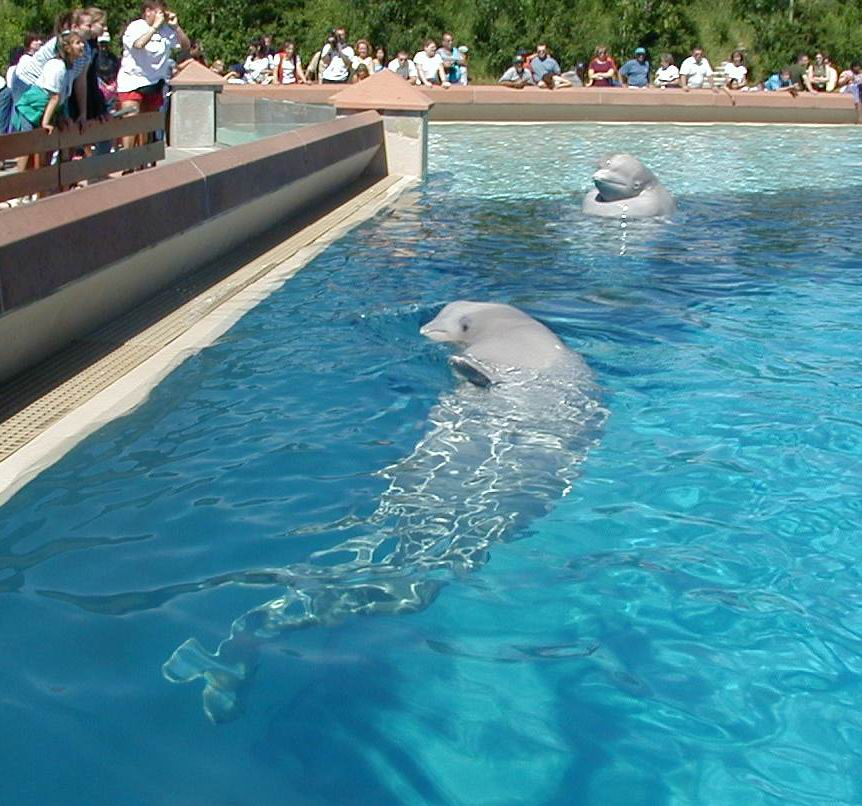
Beluga whales in Arctic Cove, 2008

In 2001, Marineland added walruses to the marine mammals it kept. The first walrus was Sonja, from the Moscow Zoo. It was joined by Zeus and Apollo two months later and Pandora, Buttercup and Buddy in 2002. Marineland added Smooshi and Azul in 2004. Sonja died in 2017, and Zeus died in 2018. In 2003, Marineland opened the "Arctic Cove" beluga whale exhibit. Beluga whales were held in Friendship Cove from May 30, 1999, until the opening of Arctic Cove in late 2003. Belugas returned to Friendship Cove in December 2008 following the importation of eight individuals. In 2014, several belugas were switched between Arctic Cove and Friendship Cove.

=== Animal-welfare allegations and legal disputes ===
Beginning in 2012, the park has been the subject of several allegations of poor conditions for its animals by former employees and animal activists have protested outside its gates on several occasions. The park stated that it had been inspected by the Ontario Society for the Prevention of Cruelty to Animals (OSPCA) and Canada's Accredited Zoos and Aquariums (CAZA), many times over the years, some leading to orders issued by the OSPCA. Marineland has filed nine lawsuits against activists, former employees and the media, and a further lawsuit against the OSPCA for malicious prosecution and reputational damage.

In 2012, articles were published by the Toronto Star alleging animal mistreatment, resulting in negative publicity. An inspection by the OSPCA and CAZA, however, found "no issues of concern". The Star reported that the OSPCA issued orders to Marineland to improve the water conditions for animals at the park and address specific issues with other animals, and that Marineland complied.

=== Orca captivity ban and Kiska ===
In 2015, the Government of Ontario banned the practice of breeding and keeping orcas in captivity, while allowing the existing one to remain at Marineland. Marineland's last orca, Kiska, died at the park in March 2023, having not interacted with another orca since 2011.

In November 2016 and January 2017, the OSPCA received a complaint from a former employee through the animal rights organization Last Chance for Animals. The OSPCA filed some charges against the park in late 2016 and early 2017, but all of the charges were withdrawn by government prosecutors later that year.

=== Death of John Holer and succession questions ===
Holer died on June 23, 2018, aged 82. He was praised as an "immigrant success story" by Senator Don Plett (Manitoba). Holer had been seriously ill for five months and died at his home on Chippewa Parkway. Holer was survived by his wife Marie and son Peter. Another son, John Mark Jr., died in 2013. After the death of Marie Holer, the Marineland estate was placed in a trust.

The mayor of Niagara Falls, Jim Diodati, said Marineland was at a "crossroads" with three options: to continue the current business model, to sell its 1,000 acres (400 ha) of land to real estate developers, or to become an amusement park without animals. Diodati favours the latter option. Marineland's lawyer Andrew Burns said that there would be no immediate changes to the business. At the time of his death, Holer was working on a new aviary attraction for Marineland. According to testimony before a Senate of Canada committee in May 2017, the 100-acre (40 ha) expansion was described as being one of the largest expansions Marineland has ever made. Holer himself described the overall park as only "half-developed."

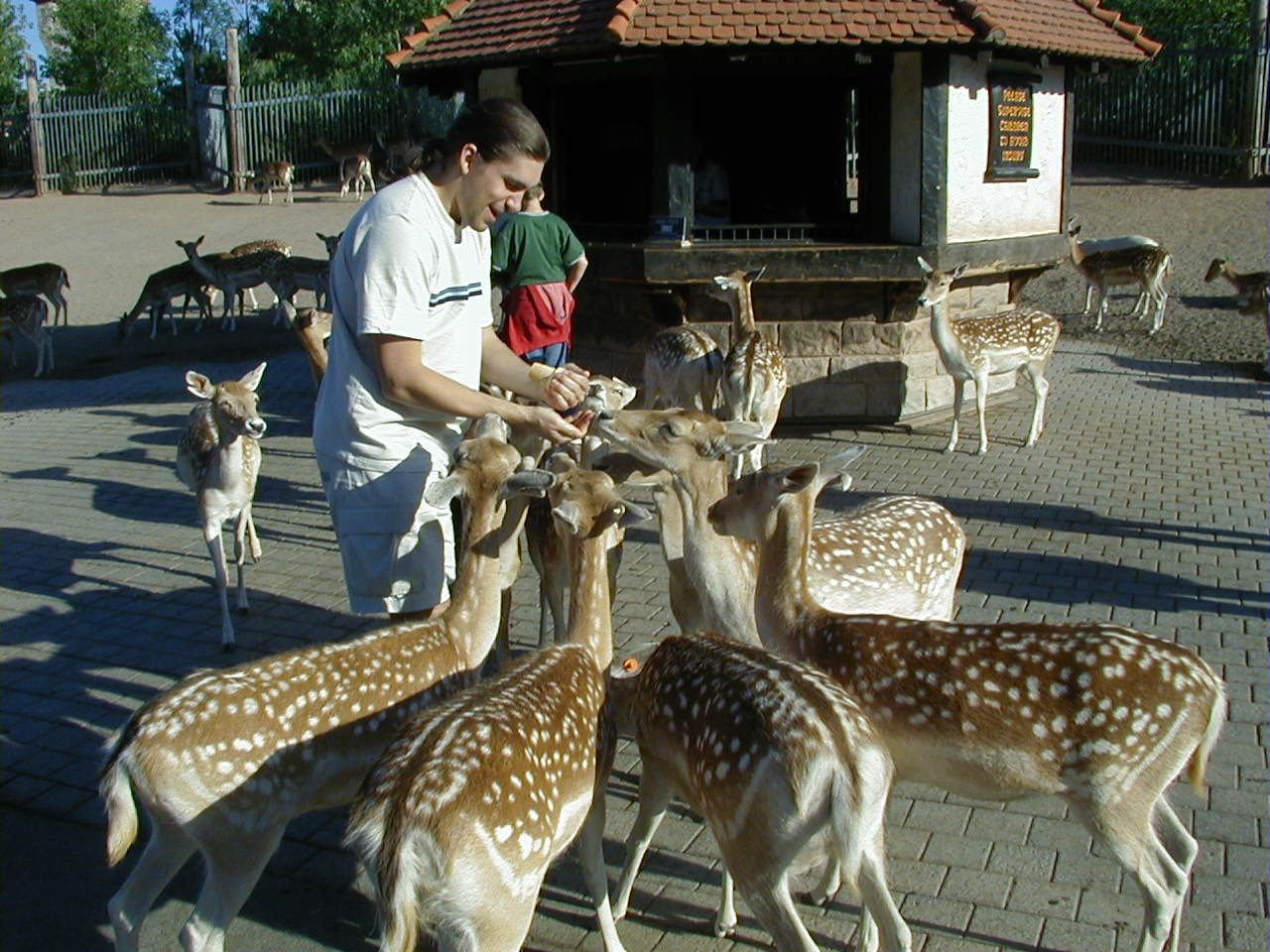
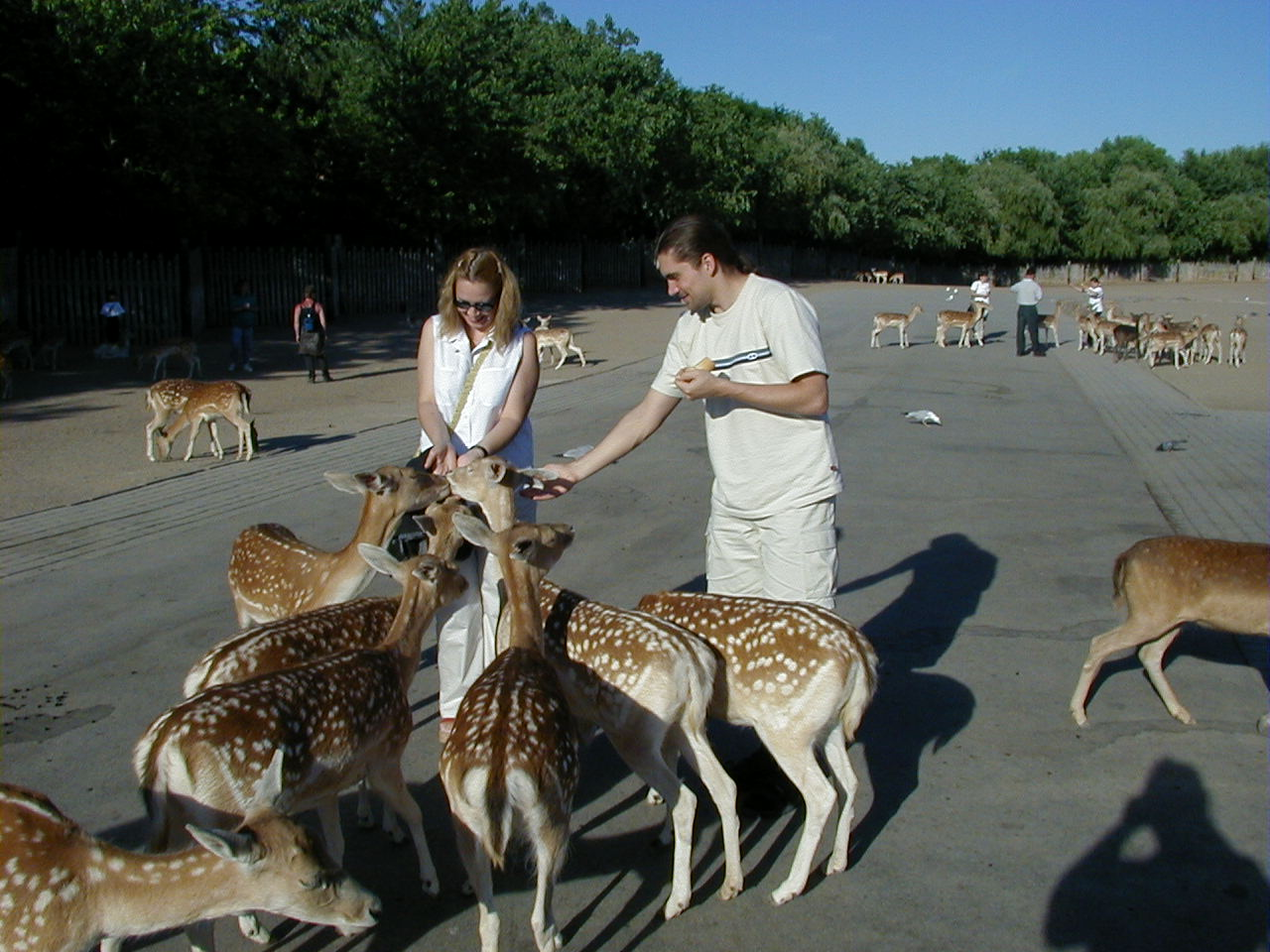
Guests inside Marineland's deer enclosure, 2001

=== Incidents and developments in 2019 ===
On opening day in May 2019, two deer died in a stampede in the deer enclosure, which was reopened for the 2019 season. According to Marineland, a father and son caused the stampede, laughed at staff, and refused to leave the enclosure, then slipped away while staff quieted the animals. Marineland closed the deer enclosure afterwards until modifications were implemented to prevent a future stampede. On May 22, it was announced that the 18-year-old walrus Apollo had died of heart failure. It was the fourth walrus to die at Marineland within two years, after Zeus, Buttercup and Sonja, and left Marineland with a single walrus, Smooshi. In June 2019, Marineland opened its new "Polar Splash" splash park attraction at a cost of CA$6 million. In June 2019, Marineland signed a ten-year partnership agreement with the Mystic Aquarium's Sea Research Foundation (a subsidiary of Ocean Wise Inc.) for beluga research. In September 2019, it was announced that Marineland had sold two beluga whales to Oceanographic, a Spanish facility owned by Ocean Wise Inc., with the permission of the Canadian government.

=== Decline and closure ===
There were reports in 2023 that Marineland was seeking a buyer, although no sale was announced. The company registered with the Government of Ontario in January 2023 as a lobbyist seeking government assistance with the potential sale and redevelopment of the property. Marie Holer formally placed the park and its approximately 1,000-acre (400 ha) property on the market in early 2024.

Marineland opened for a shortened 2024 season from June 28 to September 1. Admission prices were substantially reduced, all amusement rides remained closed and much of the park and many animal exhibits were inaccessible to visitors. The park closed for the season on September 1 and never reopened to the public. Marie Holer died on September 6, 2024, and ownership of the park was subsequently placed in a trust.

In 2025, Marineland mortgaged undeveloped lands at the rear of the property and severed them from the remaining amusement park lands. Marineland received bridge financing to support the plan, with the stipulation that all marine mammals would be removed. The subdivision was approved by the City of Niagara Falls' Committee of Adjustment in February 2025. Documents supporting the subdivision suggested that Marineland intended to redevelop the remaining theme park lands into a year-round attraction.

By 2026, Marineland was being wound down, with rides dismantled or sold and its remaining animals gradually relocated. The removal of the remaining wildlife was considered a necessary final step before the property could be transferred to a new owner.

Marineland said that it was running out of money and could no longer afford to care indefinitely for its remaining animals. During 2026, the park accelerated efforts to relocate its beluga whales, dolphins and land animals to other facilities.

By August 31, 2026, a deal for the Marineland property had reportedly been reached, with completion of the sale conditional on the remaining animals being removed from the site. Several hundred deer remained on the property at that time. The purchaser and plans for redevelopment of the approximately 1,000-acre property had not been publicly identified.

=== Fate of marine mammals ===
Following Marineland's closure, the park sought new homes for its remaining beluga whales and bottlenose dolphins. In 2025, Marineland finalized an agreement to transfer its remaining belugas and dolphins to Chimelong Ocean Kingdom in China. The federal government refused to authorize the export of the belugas, with Fisheries Minister Joanne Thompson saying that the proposed transfer was not in the whales' best interests because China did not have restrictions comparable to Canada's prohibitions on breeding and performances.

Marineland subsequently said that it was running out of money and could no longer afford to care indefinitely for the animals. The park sought between $10 million and $20 million in emergency federal financing and warned that the whales could otherwise have to be euthanized.

A consortium of aquariums, primarily in the United States, subsequently arranged to relocate the animals. The destinations included the Shedd Aquarium in Chicago, the Georgia Aquarium in Atlanta, SeaWorld San Antonio, SeaWorld San Diego, and L'Oceanogràfic in Valencia, Spain. The first transfer took place on July 21, 2026, when Acadia, Osiris, Sierra and Lillooet were moved to the Shedd Aquarium, while Bertie Botts and Frankie were transferred to SeaWorld San Antonio. A second group of seven belugas was transferred to SeaWorld San Antonio on August 4. On August 12 and 13, Caspian, Peekachu, Secord and Rain were transferred to the Shedd Aquarium, while Balor and Zephyr were transferred to the Georgia Aquarium. Three male belugas, Xavier, Cyprus and Jasper, were subsequently transferred to SeaWorld San Diego, arriving on August 23.

Peekachu, a 23-year-old female, arrived at the Shedd Aquarium on August 13 and died there on August 25. The aquarium said that she was dehydrated and was not eating well, and that she died suddenly while being treated with medication and fluids. A necropsy was undertaken to determine the cause of death. Naomi Rose, a marine-mammal scientist with the Animal Welfare Institute, suggested that Peekachu may have suffered from a storage disease, a genetic condition that can damage organs and may be exacerbated by stress. Two of three belugas that died at Mystic Aquarium between 2021 and 2023 after being transferred there from Marineland were diagnosed with storage disease after their deaths.

Following Peekachu's death, Animal Justice asked Fisheries and Oceans Canada to investigate how she had been approved for transport and called for the relocation of Marineland's six remaining belugas to be halted until the investigation was completed and the whales were determined to be healthy enough to travel. Health assessments by an accredited Canadian veterinarian were required before the whales could be transported. The federal government said that the required CITES permits had been issued following a review of the transportation plan and that Fisheries Act authorizations were issued after individual health assessments had been completed for each whale. Fisheries Minister Joanne Thompson's office said it remained confident in the relocation plan.

On September 2, Rain, a 20-year-old female beluga that had arrived at Shedd from Marineland on August 13, died at the aquarium. Beethoven, a 34-year-old male beluga that had long been part of Shedd's resident population, also died the same afternoon. Shedd said both deaths occurred despite immediate lifesaving efforts and that it did not yet know whether the deaths were related. Necropsies, blood tests and other examinations were undertaken to determine their causes.

On August 26, Marineland began transferring Cleopatra and Jelly Bean, along with its four remaining bottlenose dolphins—Echo, Lida, Marina and Tsunami—to L'Oceanogràfic in Valencia. On August 31, the park began transferring its final six belugas. Two were destined for the Shedd Aquarium and four for SeaWorld San Antonio. The source did not identify which individual whales were assigned to each facility.

On September 18, Jelly Bean, a 19-year-old beluga, died at L'Oceanogràfic after experiencing feeding difficulties following her arrival. Preliminary necropsy findings released on October 14 indicated that she had developed a "complex clinical condition", including signs of a metabolic disorder and electrolyte imbalance. Examinations revealed cardiac abnormalities, an enlarged thyroid gland and shrunken adrenal glands. The aquarium also reported that Jelly Bean had exhibited unusual behaviour, including ingesting water, during her final days, further complicating her condition.

On September 23, Echo, a 30-year-old Black Sea bottlenose dolphin, died at the same aquarium after experiencing neurological and respiratory symptoms. Echo had arrived from Marineland with severe vision impairment and limited mobility in one flipper and had required continuous veterinary care before her death. Preliminary necropsy findings revealed inflammation of the brain and nervous tissue consistent with toxoplasmosis. The aquarium said that specialists were investigating the infectious agent responsible and that the investigation into both deaths remained ongoing. Oceanogràfic stated that some of the abnormalities identified in the two animals might have developed before their transfer from Marineland without being apparent during pre-transfer health assessments.

Marine mammal scientist Naomi Rose of the Animal Welfare Institute disputed suggestions that the animals' pre-existing health problems had not been clinically apparent, stating that the whales at Marineland were already known to be in poor health. She warned that the effects of transportation stress could persist for up to a year and that further deaths were possible. Oceanogràfic reported that the surviving beluga, Cleopatra, and three dolphins were progressing well and would continue to be monitored.

Once the final transfer was completed, Marineland had moved 30 belugas and four dolphins in six relocation operations to five aquariums. The operation was described as the largest collective relocation of captive whales, and its completion left Canada without any captive whales or dolphins.

Beluga relocations, 2026
Name	Age (est.)	Gender	Destination	Arrived	Status	Notes
Acadia	~18	Female	Shedd Aquarium, Chicago	July 21, 2026	Alive	Abbott Oceanarium environment, part of a bonded "subpod"
Osiris	~26	Female	Shedd Aquarium, Chicago	July 21, 2026	Died September 21, 2026	Died at the Shedd Aquarium two months after her transfer from Marineland.
Sierra	~23	Female	Shedd Aquarium, Chicago	July 21, 2026	Alive	
Lillooet	~18	Female	Shedd Aquarium, Chicago	July 21, 2026	Alive	
Bertie Botts	6	Male	SeaWorld San Antonio, Texas	July 21, 2026	Alive	
Frankie	14	Male	SeaWorld San Antonio, Texas	July 21, 2026	Alive	
Xena	~27	Female	SeaWorld San Antonio, Texas	August 4, 2026	Alive	Transferred during the second phase of the relocation operation
Gemini	~27	Female	SeaWorld San Antonio, Texas	August 4, 2026	Alive	
Skyla	~22	Female	SeaWorld San Antonio, Texas	August 4, 2026	Alive	
Meeka	~18	Female	SeaWorld San Antonio, Texas	August 4, 2026	Alive	
Eve	18	Female	SeaWorld San Antonio, Texas	August 4, 2026	Alive	
Neva	17	Female	SeaWorld San Antonio, Texas	August 4, 2026	Alive	
Calypso	8	Female	SeaWorld San Antonio, Texas	August 4, 2026	Alive	
Caspian	~23	Female	Shedd Aquarium, Chicago	August 13, 2026	Died October 7, 2026	Died at the Shedd Aquarium.
Peekachu	23	Female	Shedd Aquarium, Chicago	August 13, 2026	Died August 25, 2026	Died at the Shedd Aquarium 12 days after her transfer from Marineland.
Secord	~18	Female	Shedd Aquarium, Chicago	August 13, 2026	Alive	
Rain, also known as Spurlock	20	Female	Shedd Aquarium, Chicago	August 13, 2026	Died September 2, 2026	Died at the Shedd Aquarium.
Zephyr	7	Male	Georgia Aquarium, Atlanta	August 13, 2026	Alive	Reported decreased appetite following transfer.
Balor	10	Male	Georgia Aquarium, Atlanta	August 13, 2026	Alive	Reported slower-than-expected weight gain following transfer.
Xavier	14	Male	SeaWorld San Diego, California	August 23, 2026	Alive	
Cyprus	10	Male	SeaWorld San Diego, California	August 23, 2026	Died October 16, 2026	Died at SeaWorld San Diego.
Jasper	10	Male	SeaWorld San Diego, California	August 23, 2026	Alive	
Cleopatra	~23	Female	L'Oceanogràfic, Valencia, Spain	August 27, 2026	Alive	Transfer began August 26, 2026; arrived the following day. Reported to be progressing well as of October 14, 2026.
Jelly Bean	~19	Female	L'Oceanogràfic, Valencia, Spain	August 27, 2026	Died September 18, 2026	Died about three weeks after her transfer from Marineland. Preliminary necropsy findings revealed signs of metabolic and electrolyte disorders, cardiac abnormalities, an enlarged thyroid gland and shrunken adrenal glands. The aquarium said that she had developed a "complex clinical condition" and that the investigation remained ongoing.
Gimli	~7	Male	Shedd Aquarium, Chicago	September 1, 2026	Alive	Among the final six belugas removed from Marineland.
Yukon	~8	Male	Shedd Aquarium, Chicago	September 1, 2026	Alive	Among the final six belugas removed from Marineland.
Odin	~8	Male	SeaWorld San Antonio, San Antonio, Texas	September 1, 2026	Alive	Among the final six belugas removed from Marineland; departed August 31 and arrived in San Antonio the following day.
Orion	~22	Male	SeaWorld San Antonio, San Antonio, Texas	September 1, 2026	Alive	Among the final six belugas removed from Marineland; departed August 31 and arrived in San Antonio the following day.
Tank	14	Male	SeaWorld San Antonio, San Antonio, Texas	September 1, 2026	Alive	Among the final six belugas removed from Marineland; departed August 31 and arrived in San Antonio the following day.
Tofino	~22	Male	SeaWorld San Antonio, San Antonio, Texas	September 1, 2026	Alive	Among the final six belugas removed from Marineland; departed August 31 and arrived in San Antonio the following day.

Dolphin relocations, 2026
Name	Age (est.)	Sex	Destination	Arrived	Status	Notes
Echo	30	Female	L'Oceanogràfic, Valencia, Spain	August 27, 2026	Died September 23, 2026	Arrived with severe vision impairment and limited mobility in one flipper. Developed neurological and respiratory symptoms before her death. Preliminary necropsy findings revealed inflammation of the brain and nervous tissue consistent with toxoplasmosis. The investigation remained ongoing.
Lida	~26	Female	L'Oceanogràfic, Valencia, Spain	August 27, 2026	Alive	Reported to be progressing well as of October 14, 2026.
Marina	~25	Female	L'Oceanogràfic, Valencia, Spain	August 27, 2026	Alive	Reported to be progressing well as of October 14, 2026.
Tsunami	~25	Female	L'Oceanogràfic, Valencia, Spain	August 27, 2026	Alive	Reported to be progressing well as of October 14, 2026.

=== Fate of land mammals ===
Approximately 700 fallow deer, red deer and elk reportedly remained on the Marineland property in the autumn of 2025. By July 2026, several hundred had been removed, while more than 300 remained. The Canadian Food Inspection Agency (CFIA) investigated whether federal requirements had been followed during the removals, while subsequent transfers were carried out under CFIA permits governing the movement of cervids.

An animal broker began removing several hundred deer from Marineland in November 2025, although their destinations were not publicly disclosed. Employees raised concerns that some animals may have been moved without required permissions or vaccinations. The CFIA temporarily halted the removal of male deer after three animals suffered injuries to their growing antlers during transport; the animals were treated and were reported to be recovering.

Marineland said that John Holer had previously agreed to transfer ownership of the park's deer, elk and bison to animal dealers Brian and Mike Hart and that responsibility for moving the animals rested with their new owners. Marineland said it provided access to the property on the understanding that applicable requirements would be followed. The park had initially found prospective homes for all of the deer but said it could not divide the herd because CFIA requirements meant that the deer and elk had to be moved together.

A northern Ontario business owner had arranged to take approximately 150 red deer and spent more than $100,000 constructing an enclosure before the arrangement was cancelled after he was told the animals had come under new ownership. The Toronto Zoo, Parc Safari and private landowners had also expressed interest in taking animals. Animal Justice alleged that some deer removed from Marineland may have been sent to slaughterhouses. The Magellan penguins were relocated to the Saint Louis Zoo.

Other land animals were relocated as Marineland wound down. A dozen black bears were transferred to an animal sanctuary in Colorado in the spring of 2026, while the park's bison herd was also relocated. Several hundred deer remained at Marineland as of August 31, 2026. A deal for the Marineland property had reportedly been reached by that date, with completion of the sale conditional on the remaining animals being removed from the site.

== Controversies ==
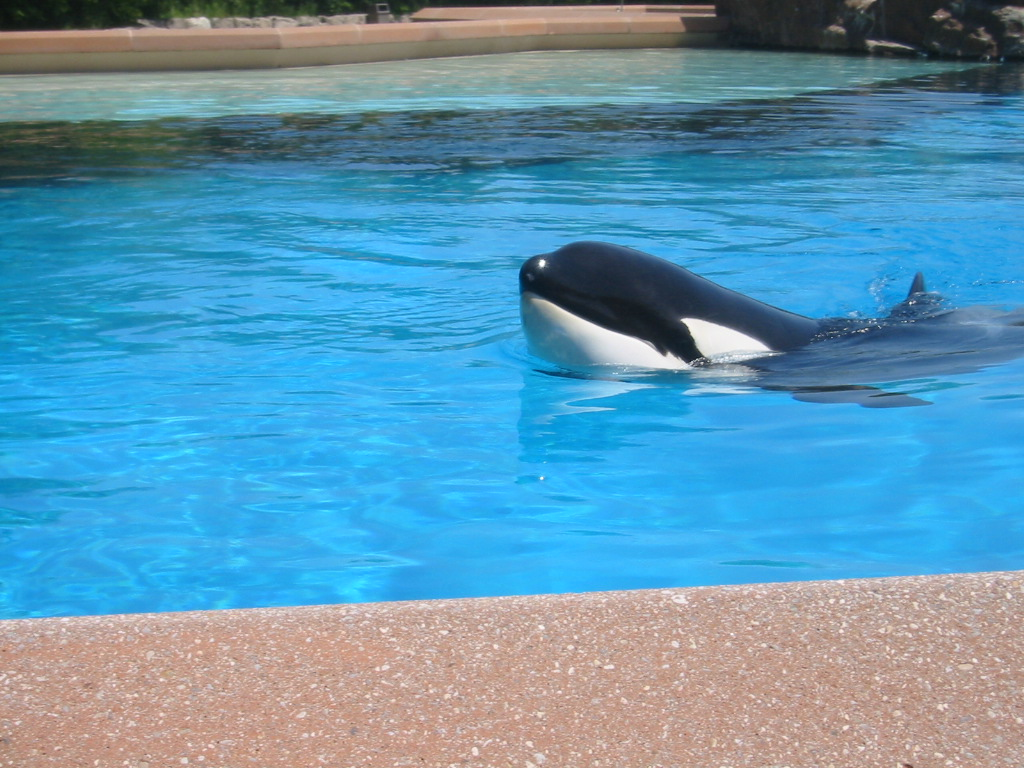
Ikaika the orca at Marineland, 2007

=== Early controversies and protests ===
Marineland and its owner John Holer have been involved in many controversies throughout the park's history. Animal rights activists have picketed regularly outside the park property for several years and continued to protest as of 2018. In 1977, the U.S. Department of Fisheries seized six bottlenose dolphins that had been illegally caught by John Holer in the Gulf of Mexico. In 1983, Niagara Falls mayor Wayne Thomson resigned amid controversy over a vacation given as a gift by a Toronto development firm and a land purchase made by his then-fiancée Bonnie Dickson. His fiancée bought some land in Niagara Falls from a seller who did not want it to be sold to Marineland. Seven months later, she sold the plot to Marineland. Holer stated she acted as trustee and was accompanied by Thomson. In the 1980s, Greenpeace was the first activist group to raise concerns about keeping killer whales in captivity. It objected to the keeping in principle, although it stated that Marineland was one of the better facilities. The level of concern grew in the 1990s. In 1997, a protest was held outside the park by Ric O'Barry, the trainer of Flipper of the television series. Other organizations present at the protest included Friends of the Dolphins, Zoocheck Canada and Earth Island Institute. The protesters alleged that Marineland separated mother and child killer whales too quickly and four other whales were stored in unsuitable facilities.

=== Green Oaks Mobile Home Park evictions ===
In 2004, Marineland acquired the Green Oaks Mobile Home Park. Five years later, in February 2009, Marineland issued eviction notices to 47 families living in Green Oaks to make way for park maintenance facilities. Just hours after the eviction deadline, Paula Millard, the last remaining tenant, committed suicide out of fear of becoming homeless. In May 2011, Holer was later ordered to pay five of the affected tenants CA$11,000 (equivalent to $15,100 in 2025) each for harassment.

=== Ikaika dispute and 2012 allegations ===
In September 2011, SeaWorld won a court battle with Marineland over the fate of Ikaika, a killer whale. Ikaika had been originally loaned to Marineland under the terms of a breeding loan agreement between the two organizations, but SeaWorld decided to terminate the agreement due to concerns about Ikaika's mental and physical well-being due to deteriorating conditions at the park. Marineland initially refused to return Ikaika, but was eventually ordered to by the Ontario Superior Court as well as pay $255,000 in compensation to SeaWorld for legal expenses. On September 10, 2012, the Toronto Star published an article quoting former Marineland supervisor Jim Hammond alleging that Marineland owner John Holer had shot one of the baby deer in his park through the windpipe with a 12-gauge shotgun, leaving it to choke on its blood without dying. Hammond claimed the park owner refused his pleas for humane euthanasia. On December 20, 2012, the Ontario Ministry of the Environment announced an investigation into several mass animal graves at the park. The ministry had no previous knowledge of the graves, as Marineland lacked permits for such use. After an investigation by the ministry, Marineland was allowed to continue using a section of the site for animal burials.

=== 2013 investigations ===
On March 5, 2013, the Toronto Star published an article quoting Hammond and a local resident alleging that John Holer had shot two Labrador Retrievers that had escaped a neighbour's house and entered Marineland property. The article also mentioned that Hammond was told by Holer "to check if there were any collars ... around their necks and if there were, to remove them." In September 2013, it was reported that the Ontario Veterinary College was investigating an unspecified number of veterinarians at Marineland. Also in 2013, OSPCA investigated the claims of some former employees of Marineland claimed that the animals' health was being put at risk by low water quality. OSPCA used the results of the investigation to make suggestions to the subsequent provincial review of its animal welfare laws.

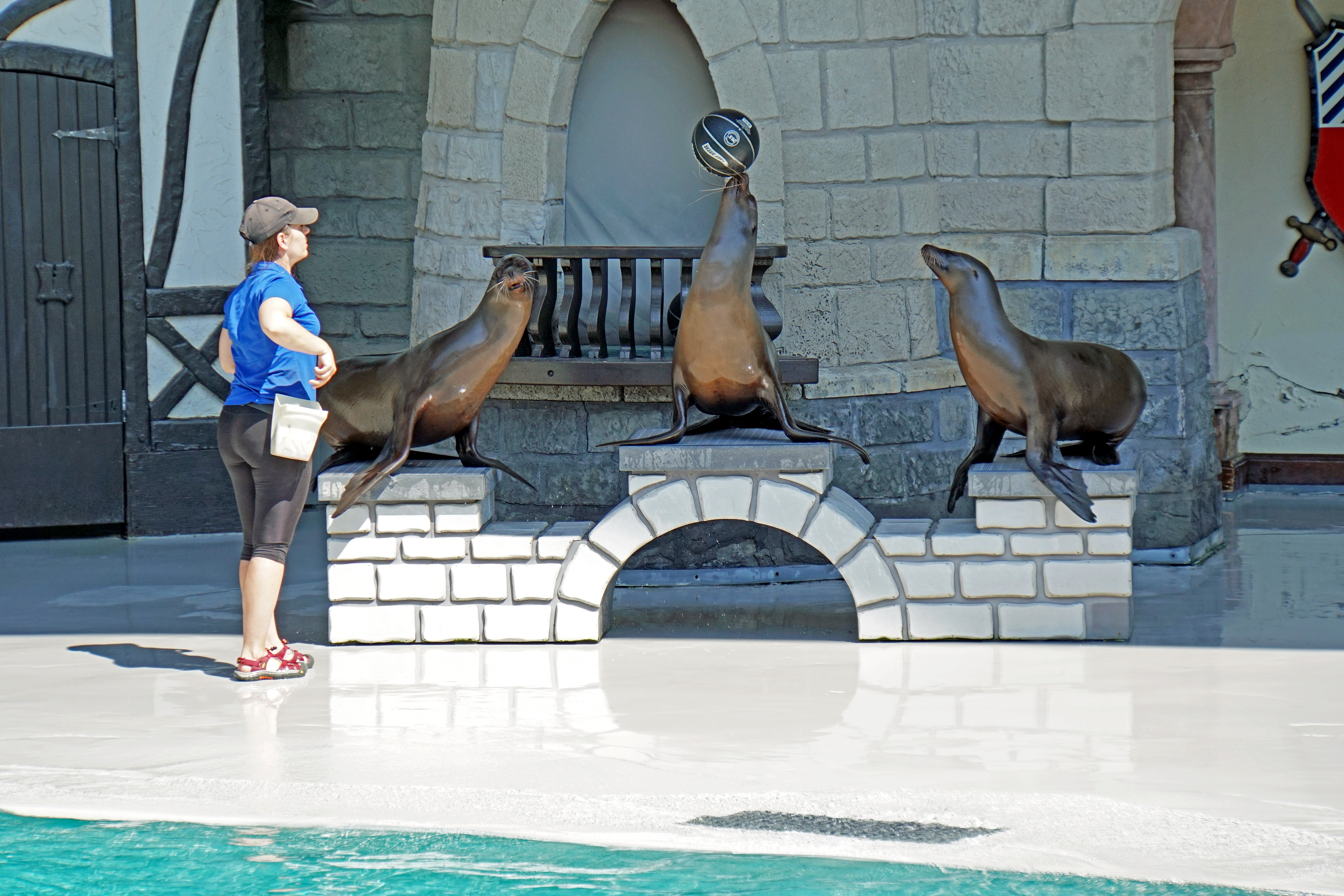
Sea lions performing at Marineland, 2017

=== Media lawsuits and orca-captivity legislation ===
In April 2014, the Vancouver newspaper The Georgia Straight published an article alleging that five harbour seals transferred from the Vancouver Aquarium had fallen ill at Marineland due to "poor water chemistry". According to the article, one, Pepper, died in 2006 from the conditions while the rest were blind. Marineland filed a CA$600,000 lawsuit in July 2014 against The Georgia Straight and the article's writer for defamation and damages. According to Marineland, Pepper did not die as described in the article and the others were not blind but were in fact generally healthy. It was the eighth lawsuit filed by Marineland since 2012, and the third against a media outlet. In 2015, the Government of Ontario took up debate of the keeping of orcas. Bob Barker urged Ontario Premier Kathleen Wynne to order Marineland to give up Kiska and other animals. On May 28, 2015, the Legislative Assembly of Ontario passed the Prevention of Cruelty to Animals Amendment Act. The act prohibits the possession or breeding of orcas in Ontario but allowed Marineland to keep its orca.

=== Black Water lawsuit ===
In May 2016, Marineland filed a $1 million lawsuit against Humboldt State University student Zach Affolter, alleging that his then-unreleased film Black Water contained unauthorized footage taken inside their park. Affolter responded by asserting that the film was "meant as an educational, non-commercial film that dives into the moral question behind keeping cetaceans in captivity".

=== Demers allegations ===
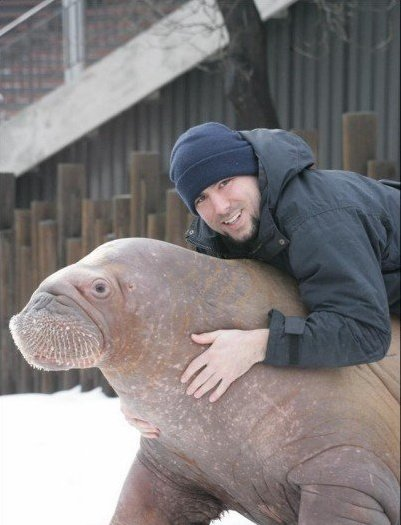
Philip Demers with the walrus Smooshi, circa 2010

In May 2012, Philip Demers, trainer of the walrus Smooshi, resigned from Marineland. He had been an employee of Marineland for 12 years and had been noted for his close relationship with Smooshi. Demers made public his concerns about Marineland and was sued. In Demers' version of accounts, Smooshi was moved from Marineland's barn to the Aquarium, where Demers said she deteriorated because of problems with the water. Smooshi was returned to the barn but problems returned. He asked for more walrus trainers, but his request was denied. By 2012, he had responsibilities for hiring and training employees taken away, and he chose to resign. On August 15, 2012, the Toronto Star published an article of Demers' account, alleging that many sea mammals at Marineland live in inhumane conditions and suffer from a variety of illnesses caused by problems with water quality and chronic understaffing. Holer denied the allegations in the report, which was largely based on interviews conducted with former Marineland employees. The Ontario Society for the Prevention of Cruelty to Animals declined to press charges, but did order changes in park procedures that were then implemented by Marineland. The controversies led to Suzie McNeil, singer of the park's jingle, "Everyone Loves Marineland", to ask the park to no longer use her recording.

Demers's campaign against the institution is profiled in the 2020 documentary film The Walrus and the Whistleblower. It was released as part of the Hot Docs Documentary Film Festival. It documented the relationship former Marineland trainer Phil Demers had with the walrus Smooshi before he quit in 2012 and became a vocal critic of the park. In June 2020, the film was named as the winner of 2020 Rogers Audience Award and as Overall Favourite at the Hot Docs Canadian International Documentary Festival. The Audience Award allowed the film to be fast tracked in the Academy Award for Best Documentary Feature category, "provided it meets all other criteria for eligibility".

The CBC's Documentary Channel item about the film stated that Demers had "appeared four times on the Joe Rogan show, has testified before the Canadian Senate, and is being sued for $1.5 million for plotting to steal Smooshi, the walrus". On September 20, 2022, Demers and the park reached a non-costs agreement where the walrus Smooshi and her calf Koyuk would be rehomed. The two walruses were moved to SeaWorld Abu Dhabi in March 2023.

=== The Ending the Captivity of Whales and Dolphins Act ===
In 2015, then-Senator Wilfred Moore of the Senate of Canada introduced Bill S-203, the Ending the Captivity of Whales and Dolphins Act. Marineland would be one of two facilities in Canada to be affected by the law after the bill is passed. Marineland, along with the Vancouver Aquarium, opposed the bill. According to Marineland, the Act advances an agenda of entrenching animal rights into the legal framework: "the granting of the rights of a person to whales—what activists call a 'non- human person'—and then to other species". The bill would "fundamentally and critically damage Marineland" and "essentially destroy Marineland's future". Marineland stated that it had enough belugas, but it wanted to get more porpoises in the future and a companion for its one orca. In September 2017, Green Party of Canada leader Elizabeth May filed a complaint to the Parliament of Canada's Lobbying Commissioner about Marineland's breaches of the Canadian Lobbying Act. Marineland had privately lobbied Members of Parliament and Senators without registering with the Lobbying Commissioner in efforts to stop Bill S-203. Marineland's lawyer Andrew Burns registered as a lobbyist in May 2018. Progressive Conservatives in the Senate, led by Sen. Don Plett, used procedural obstruction to keep the bill from moving to a vote. In June 2018, the senators added amendments intended to exclude Marineland and the Vancouver Aquarium from being covered by the bill. The bill was passed by the Senate in October 2018 and was sent to the House of Commons of Canada. Andrew Burns, Marineland's lawyer appeared at a House Fisheries Committee meeting in March 2019, to propose an amendment regarding future beluga births at Marineland, claiming the new law is unconstitutional. Senator Murray Sinclair, the bill's second sponsor in the Senate and a former judge, told MPs no one would be prosecuted when currently pregnant belugas give birth. In the opinion of Sinclair and May, Burns was only intending to delay the bill, so that it could not be passed before the end of the current session of the Parliament of Canada. The bill was passed by committee without amendments. The bill passed third and final reading in the House of Commons on June 10, 2019.

=== Animal abuse charges and complaints ===
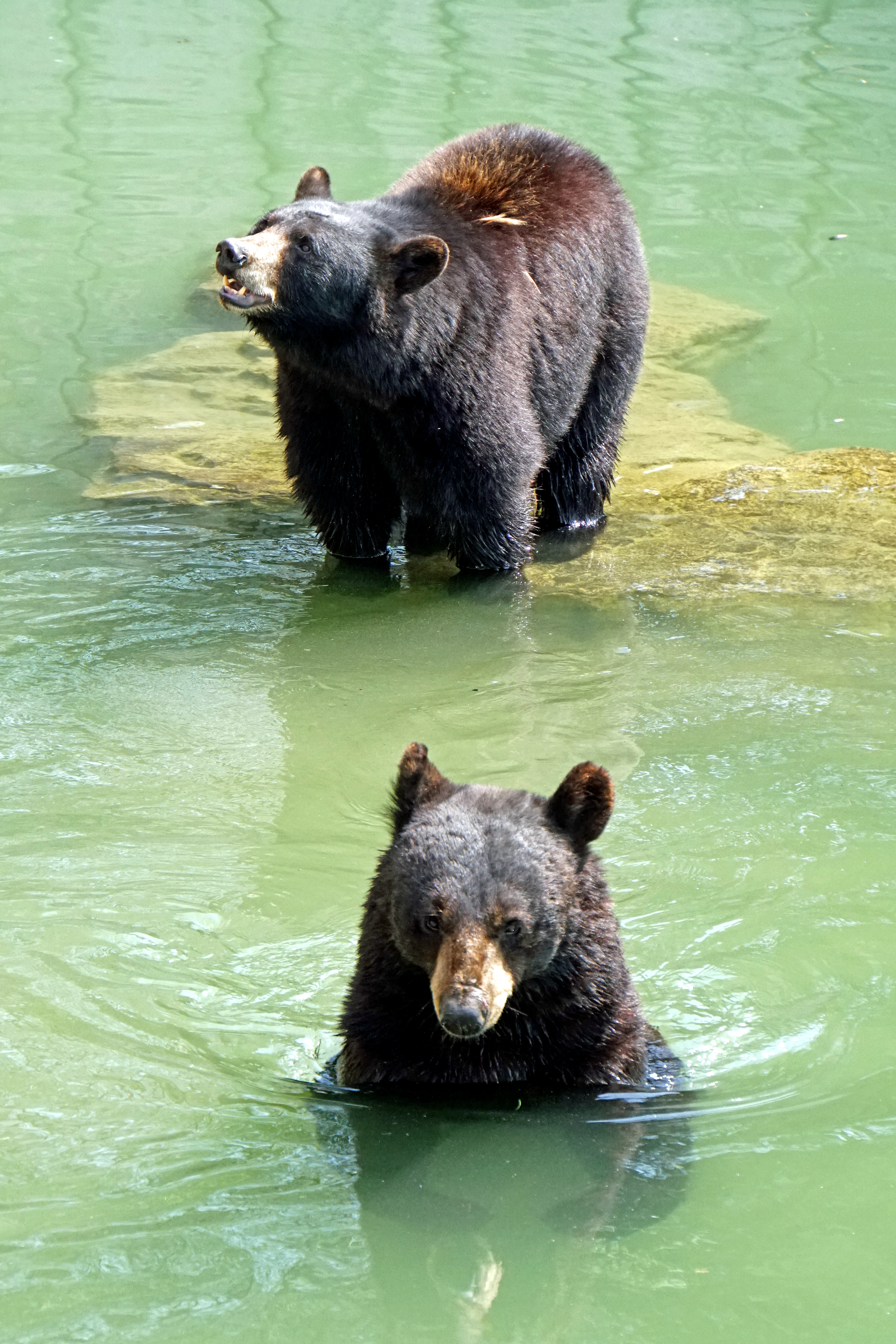
American black bears at Marineland, 2017

In 2012, the Ontario Society for the Prevention of Cruelty to Animals received complaints of animal abuse at the park from former employees and issued orders to Marineland as to the standard of care they should be following. At that time, a full investigation was not conducted. On November 10, 2016, however, the agency received a formal 35-page complaint—compiled by California-based group Last Chance for Animals—which included photographs and videos taken by a former Marineland employee whose identity has not been revealed to the public. (The Canadian Press obtained a copy of the complaint file which was reviewed by some members of the news media; only excerpts have been published.) At that time, the OSPCA began an investigation of possible animal abuse at the park using its staff and a veterinarian.

On November 25, 2016, the OSPCA charged Marineland with five counts of animal cruelty over alleged mistreatment of peafowls, guineafowls, and American black bears. The OSPCA alleged that the animals were distressed and did not receive the required standard of care from Marineland. The company denied the allegations.

Marineland also provided a statement to The Canadian Press: "(Last Chance for Animals) is working together with the fired former employee to exact revenge over his firing and advance their radical cause and goal to shut Marineland." The company also posted a commentary on their Web site indicating that it is "being attacked by disgruntled former employees again, who are working with a professional activist group that raises just under 2 million dollars per year to share their distorted view of facts about others." The post indicated that the company would "vigorously defend ourselves against these charges laid by the OSPCA".

A news article on August 10, 2017, stated that the park had started a lawsuit against former employee Demers, one of those who had filed complaints with the OSPCA, for CA$1.5 million and that this is only one of nine lawsuits against activists, former employees and the media since 2012. None of the suits have been resolved in court.

Six additional counts of animal cruelty were laid by the OSPCA on January 9, 2017. The new charges related to the treatment of elk, red deer and fallow deer. Deputy chief Jennifer Bluhm of the OSPCA provided the following comment: "While the investigation is still ongoing, these are all the charges we expect to be laid in this case." On previous occasions, Marineland had stated that it would defend against charges in court. The company's first appearance to plead to the charges was set for January 26, 2017.

On the same day, Marineland posted another response on its website, critical of the OSPCA handling of the investigation and the charges, including the following comment: "We believe the OSPCA is continuing a publicity campaign at the behest of a band of discredited activists with little relevant expertise or knowledge, in an effort to avoid further embarrassment related to an ongoing investigation into the OSPCA’s perceived failure to protect animals that is being led by the same activists they are now firmly in bed with. ... We will hold the OSPCA to the high standards of Ontario’s legal system and require them to defend their charges to the fullest extent possible."

On August 10, 2017, all charges were withdrawn in Niagara Falls Provincial court. The prosecutor stated that there was no likelihood of conviction and pursuit of the matters was found to not be in the public interest. The OSPCA inspected the park a week later and did not find any issues of concern.

In October 2017, Marineland filed a lawsuit against the OSPCA, alleging that the OSPCA launched its investigation purely to harm Marineland. "It was motivated by a series of improper objectives, including a desire to accomplish its own policy agenda, to mollify the animal activist community, to please its donors, and to effectively destroy Marineland." Marineland is seeking CA$21 million in damages. The OSPCA responded publicly that it "vehemently denies all of the allegations and will defend itself."

A subsequent pleading by the OSPCA stated that any losses suffered by Marineland due to the charges "are entirely the result of its own misconduct and that (Marineland) is the author of its own misfortune."

In January 2020, Ontario's Animal Welfare Services took over enforcement of anti-cruelty laws from OSPCA. Subsequently, it opened an investigation into Marineland, which is ongoing as of May 2023. Since then, Marineland has been inspected at least 160 times, but the government has so far refused to reveal any details. However, in May 2021, an affidavit obtained by The Canadian Press revealed that inspectors had issued two orders to Marineland to repair water systems in animal enclosures. Court documents also revealed that inspectors found all marine mammals in the park to be in distress. Marineland appealed the orders, denying the distress and any relation between water quality and recent deaths, but dropped the appeal a few weeks later.

On May 31, 2023, the Government of Ontario charged Marineland over the care of its black bears. "Marineland of Canada, Inc. in Niagara Falls, Ontario, was charged with three counts of failing to comply with an order, related to the care of American Black Bears," said Brent Ross, a spokesman for the ministry.

=== Beluga whale deaths ===
During the nearly three decades (1999–August 2026) that beluga whales were held at Marineland, a number of them died – including those that died from old age; specific data for 2019–2026, from Ontario government records and official statements, show that 19 belugas died during its final eight years. The beluga deaths at Marineland include:

- Dee, a beluga whale imported from Russia, died in August 2000 after a petting session. At the time, news reports indicated that this was the third recent death; in December 1999 another female beluga died from liver failure and in March 2000, Malik, a three-year-old orca, died. This led two animal rights groups to urge the Government of Canada to issue a moratorium on the import of belugas.
- Sasha, a beluga whale born in 2008 at Marineland, died around October 10, 2011, several days before the off-season.
- On May 28, 2012, a nine-month-old beluga, Skoot, born to Skyla, succumbed to its injuries after a two-hour attack by two adult males in a shared tank. Only an untrained guide was on hand to try to stop the attack and he said it took a long time for trainers to respond. By that time, the calf had already died. Marineland's John Holer told the news media that the calf died because of meningitis.
- In May 2013, an aquatic inventory website (Ceta-Base.org) reported that belugas Luna and Charlotte were both deceased and said these were the latest of 18 other beluga deaths over the years. The site's August 2017 report indicates additional beluga deaths, some without a date, with the most recent (named R1) having been on July 30, 2015. Charlotte died from a metabolic disorder; the cause of death for Luna was not known.
- In August 2017, Gia (who had been born at the park) died suddenly. A preliminary report indicated that the cause may have been a twisted small intestine that resulted in a fatal blockage. The Ceta-Base site indicates that Gia had been born in 2012.
- In May 2023, Kodiak, a 28-year-old beluga, and Sonar, a 26-year-old dolphin, died.
- In February 2025, Marineland euthanized a seven-year-old beluga whale after it had struggled with medical conditions for several years.

=== Orca deaths ===
A Toronto Star report in November 2012 stated that "Marineland has had 26 killer whales over roughly three decades, according to ... Zoocheck Canada. Of these, 17 died at Marineland. ... Six died in other parks after being transferred while one died en route from Marineland to Japan". The following include orca deaths that were well documented.

- An unnamed whale died at the park in October 1992 from drowning.
- Junior, a wild Icelandic male orca, being kept in an indoor barn, died in June 1994.
- Kanuck, separated from mother, Kiska and stored in a warehouse. Died at age 4 in 1998.
- An unnamed whale born at Marineland died in June 1998.
- Malik, a three-year-old orca, died due to a deficient immune system in March 2000.
- Nova died in August 2001.
- Algonquin died in August 2002 due to a twisted intestine.
- April died in April 2004.
- Neocia died in August 2004 at Marineland. The death of this 12-year-old whale was reported as the fifth in five years at the Ontario park.
- Hudson died in October 2004 with the cause of death being meningitis.
- Kandu, a wild whale from Iceland that had been at the park since the 1980s, died on December 21, 2005.
- Katak/Splash was born at Marineland and was moved to SeaWorld in 1992 for health treatment. He died in April 2005.
- Nootka V died in January 2008 at Marineland. Nootka had been brought to Marineland in 1979 after being captured near Iceland.
- Athena died sometime in spring 2009. The cause of death was by infection.
- An unnamed whale died while being moved from Marineland to Japan.
- Kiska, the park's last remaining orca, died from bacterial infection on March 10, 2023.

== Advertising ==
For many years, Marineland's main advertising was through a series of radio and television commercials with the jingle "Everyone Loves Marineland", an upbeat pop jingle originally sung by Eria Fachin and later by Ann-Marie McDonnell and Suzie McNeil. Marineland has also used other slogans over the years in its advertising:

- "Come to Marineland" (1980–1984)
- "Where the Fun Never Stops" (1985–1988)
- "Happiness is Marineland" (1987–1992)
- "Everyone Loves Marineland" (1993–2024)
- "A Magical Place Marineland" (1995)

== See also ==
- List of captive orcas
- Miami Seaquarium
