= Ending the Captivity of Whales and Dolphins Act =

2019 Canadian legislation

Parliament of Canada
- Long title: An Act to amend the Criminal Code and other Acts (ending the captivity of whales and dolphins)
- Citation: S.C. 2019, c. 11
- Considered by: Senate of Canada
- Considered by: House of Commons of Canada
- Assented to: 21st June, 2019
- Effective: 2019-06-21

Legislative history

Initiating chamber: Senate of Canada
- Bill citation: Bill S-203
- Introduced by: Wilfred Moore
- First reading: 2015-12-08
- Second reading: 2016-11-23
- Third reading: 2018-10-23

Revising chamber: House of Commons of Canada
- First reading: 2018-10-29
- Second reading: 2019-02-01
- Third reading: 2019-06-10

Amends
- Criminal Code; Fisheries Act; Wild Animal and Plant Protection and Regulation of International and Interprovincial Trade Act
- Status: In force

The Ending the Captivity of Whales and Dolphins Act (French: Loi visant à mettre fin à la captivité des baleines et des dauphins) is an act of the Parliament of Canada. Passed into law in 2019, the Act bans the capture and keeping in captivity of cetaceans (the biological taxon comprising whales, dolphins, and porpoises). There is a grandfather clause for cetaceans in captivity when the law first came into force, and other exceptions, such as where a provincial government has issued a licence to keep cetaceans for research purposes.

== History ==
In December 2015, then-Senator Wilfred Moore of the Senate of Canada introduced Bill S-203. At the time of its introduction, only two facilities kept live cetaceans in Canada. Marineland of Canada kept beluga whales, dolphins and a killer whale, and Vancouver Aquarium kept one dolphin, two beluga whales, two harbour porpoises, and a false killer whale.

Both Marineland and the Vancouver Aquarium opposed the bill. Marineland believes that it advances an agenda of entrenching animal rights into the legal framework: "the granting of the rights of a person to whales — what activists call a 'non- human person' — and then to other species". The bill would "fundamentally and critically damage Marineland" and "essentially destroy Marineland's future". Marineland believes that it has enough belugas, but it would like to get some more porpoises in the future and a companion for its one orca. The Canada's Accredited Zoos and Aquariums (CAZA) association issued an open letter asking the Senators to reject the bill. The Vancouver Aquarium opposed the bill on the grounds it would impede their research and not allow them to put on display any animals under rescue or it felt were not releasable to the wild.

In September 2017, Green Party of Canada leader Elizabeth May filed a complaint to the Parliament of Canada's Lobbying Commissioner about Marineland's breaches of the Canadian Lobbying Act. Marineland had privately lobbied Members of Parliament and Senators without registering with the Lobbying Commissioner in efforts to stop Bill S-203. Marineland's lawyer Andrew Burns registered as a lobbyist in May 2018.

Conservatives in the Senate, led by Senator Don Plett, used procedural obstruction to keep the bill from moving to a vote. In June 2018, the senators added amendments intended to exclude Marineland and the Vancouver Aquarium from being covered by the bill. The bill was passed by the Senate in October 2018 and was sent to the House of Commons of Canada.

The bill passed first reading in the House of Commons and was referred to the Fisheries Committee for review. Burns appeared at a House Fisheries Committee meeting in March 2019, to propose an amendment regarding future beluga births at Marineland, claiming the new law is unconstitutional. Senator Murray Sinclair, the bill's second sponsor in the Senate and a former judge, told MPs no one is going to be prosecuted when currently pregnant belugas give birth. In the opinion of Sinclair and May, Burns was only intending to delay the bill, so that it could not be passed before the end of the current session of the Parliament of Canada. The bill was passed by committee without amendments.

Faced with a backlog of bills prior to the conclusion of the session of Parliament before the 2019 election, the Trudeau government extended the hours that the Commons would sit. The Act passed third and final reading in the House of Commons on June 10, 2019. It received Royal Assent on June 21, 2019.

== Sections ==
Under the Criminal Code, it is now an offence to own or breed cetaceans in captivity. Exceptions are provided for those who already have such animals in captivity at the time the bill took effect, those who are assisting an animal in distress, those undertaking research or under a license by a Lieutenant-Governor or their designates. Fines are no more than CA$200,000.

Under the Fisheries Act, it bans the moving of any live cetacean from the immediate vicinity, except if the animal is in distress.

Under the Wild Animal and Plant Protection and Regulation of International and Interprovincial Trade Act, the Act would have banned the import or export of live animals, embryos, sperm and tissue cultures except where a license is granted by the Minister. However, these provisions of the Act were deemed never to have come into force and were repealed, by operation of subsection 58.1(8) of An Act to amend the Fisheries Act and other Acts in consequence, which also came into effect on June 21, 2019.

Section 6 of the Act is a for-greater-certainty clause, clarifying that the other provisions of the Act do not subtract anything from existing aboriginal rights or treaty rights recognized and affirmed in Section 35 of the Constitution Act, 1982.

The new provisions are section 445.2 of the Criminal Code and sections 23.1 to 23.6 of the Fisheries Act. The provisions of the Fisheries Act set out additional exceptions to the prohibition in section 445.2 of the Criminal Code. These were enacted by sections 15 and 58.1 of An Act to amend the Fisheries Act and other Acts in consequence, which was also given royal assent on June 21, 2019. Additionally, section 58.3 of that Act operates as a grandfather clause to the prohibition against breeding (and possessing reproductive materials), in respect of a cetacean that is gestating on the day the legislation entered into force.

== Reactions ==
The Canadian branch of Humane Society International called the Act a "landmark victory" and "a watershed moment in the protection of marine animals".

Marineland of Canada, which had been a vocal opponent of the legislative proposal, had argued the law would devastate attendance at its park, threaten conservation efforts, and threaten summer employment of hundreds of local residents. Its lawyer also argued the law was unconstitutional. After the bill passed, Marineland issued a statement saying it would comply with all animal welfare legislation in Canada, and it is confident its operations remain compliant with all aspects of the bill.

John Gustavsson, president and CEO of the parent company of the Vancouver Aquarium, said "You can have a world-class conservation aquarium without whales and dolphins and that’s what we don’t have. We have no intention not to follow Canadian law … and it’s not controversial for me."

Added coverage of Bill S-15 and Fern Levitt’s 2026 Globe and Mail commentary on extending Canada’s captive-animal protections.

== See also ==
- Dolphinarium
