= Wilfred Moore =

Canadian politician

The Honourable Wilfred Moore KC

Senator for Stanhope Street-South Shore, Nova Scotia
- In office September 26, 1996 – January 14, 2017
- Nominated by: Jean Chrétien
- Appointed by: Roméo LeBlanc

Personal details
- Born: January 14, 1942 (age 84) Halifax, Nova Scotia, Canada
- Party: Liberal (until 2014); Independent Liberal (2014-present)
- Education: Saint Mary's University Dalhousie University

Wilfred P. Moore KC (born January 14, 1942) is a Canadian lawyer and politician. From 1996 until his retirement in 2017, he represented Nova Scotia in the Senate of Canada. In the Senate, Moore successfully fought to ban the captivity of cetaceans, introducing a bill in 2015 that went on to become the Ending the Captivity of Whales and Dolphins Act. This act became law in 2019 after Moore's retirement.

== Early life and education ==
Born in Halifax, Nova Scotia, Moore received a Bachelor of Commerce degree from Saint Mary's University in 1964 and a law degree from Dalhousie University in 1968. He was made a Queen's Counsel in 1983.

== Career ==
He was an alderman on Halifax city council from 1974 to 1980 and served as deputy mayor from 1977 to 1978. He has also served as Chairman of the Social Assistance Appeal Board for Halifax and Dartmouth; Chairman of the Halifax Metro Centre, and as a member of the Board of Governors of Saint Mary's University. He also serves as Chairman of the Bluenose II Preservation Trust.

== Appointment to the Senate ==
Moore was appointed to the Senate on the advice of Jean Chrétien on September 26, 1996. He sits as a Liberal.

Moore criticized the December 2008 senate appointments of 18 Conservative loyalists by Prime Minister Stephen Harper saying,"With regard to the rumoured filling of the vacancies, you have to look at the motivation...Is it just because he's afraid of losing government or is it because he wants the chamber to work, causing him to do his constitutional duty?...If it does happen I'm pleased the Senate will be filled and the chamber can work properly as one of our two houses of Parliament".

On January 29, 2014, Liberal Party leader Justin Trudeau announced all Liberal Senators, including Moore, were removed from the Liberal caucus, and would continue sitting as Independents. The Senators referred to themselves as the Senate Liberal Caucus even though they were no longer members of the parliamentary Liberal caucus.
