= Ontario Society for the Prevention of Cruelty to Animals =

Animal-focused charitable organization

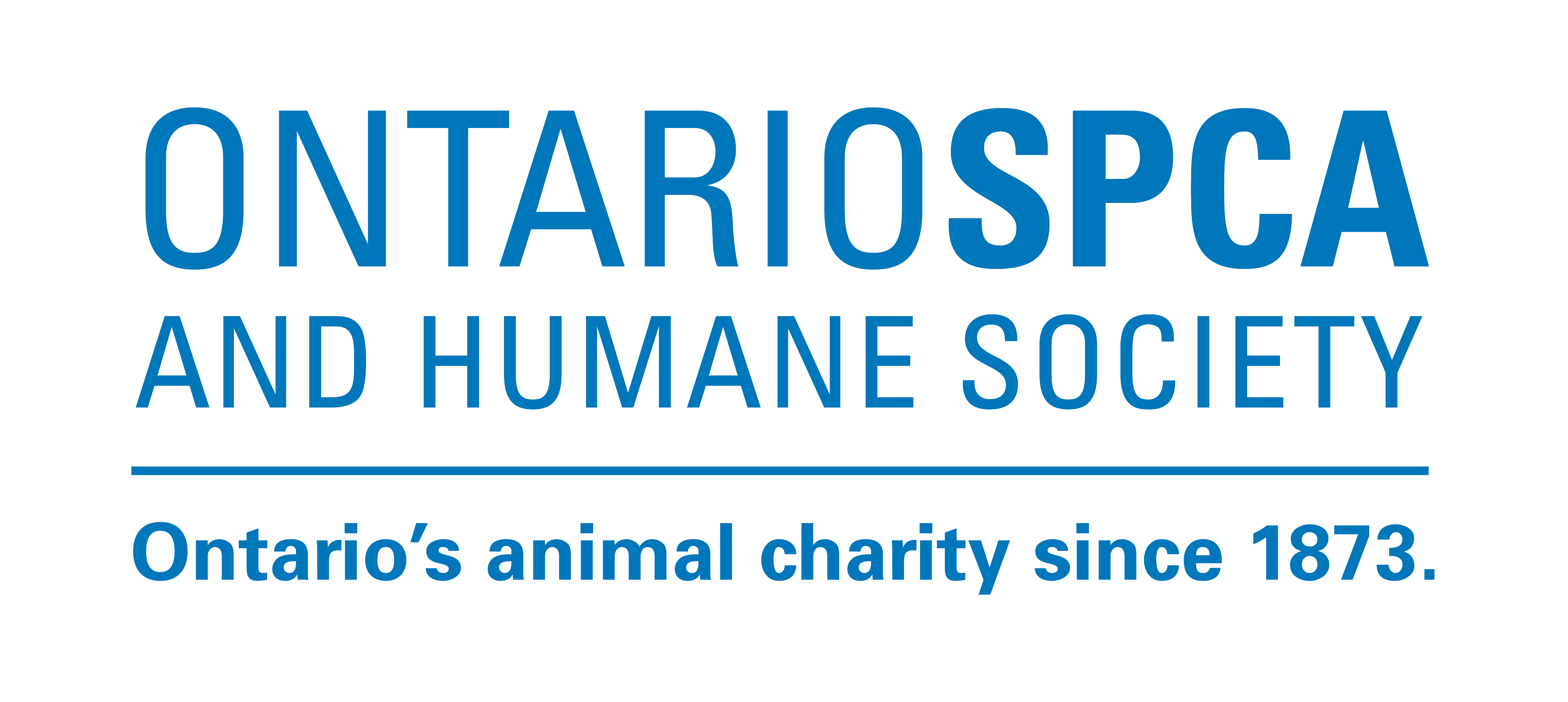
- Abbreviation: OSPCA
- Formation: 1873
- Type: Animal welfare organization
- Legal status: active
- Headquarters: Whitchurch–Stouffville, Ontario
- Region served: Ontario
- Official language: English; French
- Website: OSPCA

The Ontario SPCA and Humane Society (Ontario SPCA) is a registered Canadian charity focused on animal protection and animal advocacy.

In the spring of 2009, the Ontario SPCA introduced the model of high-volume spay/neuter to the Province of Ontario as the humane response to pet over-population.

== History ==
The Ontario SPCA was founded as a charity in 1873 to prevent cruelty to animals. In 1919, the Ontario SPCA incorporated as a non-profit in Ontario and, in addition to fulfilling its charitable mission, accepted the role of enforcing provincial animal welfare legislation on behalf of the Government of Ontario.

== Legislation ==
From 1919 to 2013, no operational funding was provided by the province to enforce their provincial animal welfare legislation. In 2013, the first operational funding of $5.5 million per year was provided for province-wide service. In 2017, the amount was increased to $5.75 million annually.

== Responsibilities ==
In January 2019, an Ontario Superior Court Judge ruled that it is unconstitutional for the Province of Ontario to enact legislation that permits a private charity to have policing powers without government oversight. The decision was suspended for one year to allow the Ontario Government to transition to a new service delivery model. The Ontario SPCA was not a party to the suit. In February 2019, the Government of Ontario announced its decision to appeal the ruling.

March 2019, the Ontario SPCA initiated the transfer of enforcement services back to the province and offered a new operational model where the Ontario SPCA will provide animal-related support services to enforcement agencies. In addition, the Ontario SPCA offered a three-month transition phase of continued service to assist the Government of Ontario as they transition to a new enforcement model. The Ontario SPCA completed their role in enforcing provincial animal welfare legislation for the province in June 2019. The decision to return the responsibility of legislation enforcement back to the government was made largely in light of the court's ruling and also in light of heightened safety concerns for Ontario SPCA Officers and concerns with current laws, such as breed specific legislation, conflicting with the mission of the charity
