= Borsos Competition =

Canadian film festival award

The Borsos Competition is the main awards program for Canadian feature films screening at the annual Whistler Film Festival. The award is named in memory of Canadian film director Phillip Borsos.

Introduced for the first time in 2004, the juried competition presents six awards annually to honour films, actors, screenplays, directors, cinematographers and editors in Canadian cinema. Initially, only films that were having their world premieres at Whistler were eligible for the competition, although this requirement was soon dropped as the festival had difficulty attracting entrants who were willing to forego larger film festivals such as TIFF or the FNC, and thereafter films selected for competition only had to be a regional premiere within the Western Canada region.

From the award's inauguration until 2015, six films were selected for competition each year, except in 2012 when eight films competed; in 2015, the festival dropped size limits, and since then the competition has typically included between 10 and 20 films per year.

The festival also presents several other awards, which are not part of the Borsos Competition.

== Films in competition ==
=== 2000s ===
Year	Film	Director	Ref
2004	The Papal Chase	Kenny Hotz	
2004	Better Off in Bed	Reginald Harkema	
2004	Cable Beach	James Head	
2004	Eighteen	Richard Bell	
2004	Part of the Game	Rick Alyea	
2004	Pink Ludoos	Gaurav Seth	
2005	Exiles in Lotusland	Ilan Saragosti	
2005	The End of Silence	Anita Doron	
2005	Fetching Cody	David Ray	
2005	Love Is Work	John Kalangis	
2005	Six Figures	David Christensen	
2005	The Zero Sum	Raphael Assaf	
2006	The Secret Life of Happy People (La vie secrète des gens heureux)	Stéphane Lapointe	
2006	Immigrant	Bojan Bodružić	
2006	The Point	Joshua Dorsey	
2006	SK8	S. Wyeth Clarkson	
2006	Steel Toes	David Gow, Mark Adam	
2006	Who Loves the Sun	Matt Bissonnette	
2006	Craft awards: • Catherine De Léan (The Secret Life of Happy People) and Andrew Walker (Steel Toes), Best Performance		
2007	Continental, a Film Without Guns (Continental, un film sans fusil)	Stéphane Lafleur	
2007	Amal	Richie Mehta	
2007	Family Motel	Helene Klodawsky	
2007	Portage	Sascha Drews, Ezra Krybus	
2007	River	Mark Wihak	
2007	Walk All Over Me	Robert Cuffley	
2007	Craft awards: • Maya Batten-Young (River) and Rupinder Nagra (Amal), Best Performance		
2008	3 Seasons	Jim Donovan	
2008	The Baby Formula	Alison Reid	
2008	Before Tomorrow (Le jour avant le lendemain)	Marie-Hélène Cousineau, Madeline Ivalu	
2008	Girlfriend Experience	Ileana Pietrobruno	
2008	Nurse.Fighter.Boy	Charles Officer	
2008	Who Is KK Downey?	Pat Kiely, Darren Curtis	
2008	Craft awards: • Clark Johnson (Nurse.Fighter.Boy) and Carinne Leduc (3 Seasons), Best Performance		
2009	Vital Signs (Les Signes vitaux)	Sophie Deraspe	
2009	Defendor	Peter Stebbings	
2009	Machotaildrop	Corey Adams, Alex Craig	
2009	Skid Love	Ryan Arnold	
2009	The Wild Hunt	Alexandre Franchi	
2009	Year of the Carnivore	Sook-Yin Lee	
2009	Craft awards: • Marie-Hélène Bellavance (Vital Signs) and Woody Harrelson (Defendor), Best Performance		

=== 2010s ===
Year	Film	Director	Ref
2010	The Whistleblower	Larysa Kondracki	
2010	Good Neighbours	Jacob Tierney	
2010	Hard Core Logo 2	Bruce McDonald	
2010	Jo for Jonathan (Jo pour Jonathan)	Maxime Giroux	
2010	Small Town Murder Songs	Ed Gass-Donnelly	
2010	Wrecked	Michael Greenspan	
2010	Craft awards: • Raphaël Lacaille (Jo for Jonathan) and Martha Plimpton (Small Town Murder Songs), Best Performance		
2011	Keyhole	Guy Maddin	
2011	388 Arletta Avenue	Randall Cole	
2011	Café de Flore	Jean-Marc Vallée	
2011	Doppelgänger Paul	Dylan Akio Smith, Kris Elgstrand	
2011	Marilyn	Christopher Petry	
2011	Monsieur Lazhar	Philippe Falardeau	
2011	Craft awards: None presented this year.		
2012	Picture Day	Kate Melville	
2012	All That You Possess (Tout ce que tu possèdes)	Bernard Émond	
2012	Blood Pressure	Sean Garrity	
2012	Fair Sex (Les Manèges humains)	Martin Laroche	
2012	Home Again	Sudz Sutherland	
2012	Mad Ship	David Mortin	
2012	My Awkward Sexual Adventure	Sean Garrity	
2012	Still Mine	Michael McGowan	
2012	Craft awards: • Marie-Evelyne Lessard (Fair Sex) and Tatiana Maslany (Picture Day), Best Performance		
2013
2013	The Husband	Bruce McDonald	
2013	Cas & Dylan	Jason Priestley	
2013	Louis Cyr (Louis Cyr, l'homme le plus fort du monde)	Daniel Roby	
2013	Patch Town	Craig Goodwill	
2013	Siddharth	Richie Mehta	
2013	Uvanga	Marie-Hélène Cousineau, Madeline Ivalu	
2013	Craft awards: • Tatiana Maslany (Cas & Dylan), Best Performance		
2014	Felix and Meira (Félix et Meira)	Maxime Giroux	
2014	After the Ball	Sean Garrity	
2014	Bang Bang Baby	Jeffrey St. Jules	
2014	Mountain Men	Cameron Labine	
2014	Relative Happiness	Deanne Foley	
2014	Wolves	David Hayter	
2014	Craft awards: • Hadas Yaron (Felix and Meira), Best Performance • Maxime Giroux (Felix and Meira), Best Director, Best Screenplay		
2015	River	Jamie M. Dagg	
2015	Basic Human Needs	Matthew Yim	
2015	The Birdwatcher	Siobhan Devine	
2015	The Colossal Failure of the Modern Relationship	Sergio Navarretta	
2015	The Demons (Les Démons)	Philippe Lesage	
2015	The Diary of an Old Man (Le Journal d’un vieil homme)	Bernard Émond	
2015	Forsaken	Jon Cassar	
2015	FSM	Melanie M. Jones	
2015	He Hated Pigeons	Ingrid Veninger	
2015	The Hotel Dieu	Adrian Thiessen	
2015	The Mirage (Le Mirage)	Ricardo Trogi	
2015	Natasha	David Bezmozgis	
2015	Nestor	Daniel Robinson	
2015	Numb	Jason R. Goode	
2015	Patterson's Wager	O. Corbin Saleken	
2015	The Sabbatical	Brian Stockton	
2015	The Steps	Andrew Currie	
2015	The Sublet	John Ainslie	
2015	Suspension	Jeffery Scott Lando	
2015	Craft awards: • Paul Savoie (The Diary of an Old Man), Best Performance • Jamie M. Dagg (River), Best Director, Best Screenplay • Dylan Macleod (He Hated Pigeons), Best Cinematography		
2016	Before the Streets (Avant les rues)	Chloé Leriche	
2016	An American Dream: The Education of William Bowman	Ken Finkleman	
2016	The Cyclotron (Le Cyclotron)	Olivier Asselin	
2016	The Death (and Life) of Carl Naardlinger	Katherine Schlemmer	
2016	Grand Unified Theory	David Ray	
2016	Hunting Pignut	Martine Blue	
2016	It's Not My Fault and I Don't Care Anyway	Chris Craddock	
2016	Lost Solace	Chris Scheuerman	
2016	Lovesick	Tyson Caron	
2016	Menorca	John Barnard	
2016	Population Zero	Adam Levins	
2016	Raw	David I. Strasser	
2016	Red Mile	Justin McConnell	
2016	The Second Time Around	Leon Marr	
2016	The Space Between	Amy Jo Johnson	
2016	The Squealing Game	Steve Kerr	
2016	The Sun at Midnight	Kirsten Carthew	
2016	The 3 L'il Pigs 2 (Les 3 p'tits cochons 2)	Jean-François Pouliot	
2016	The Void	Jeremy Gillespie, Steven Kostanski	
2016	Craft awards: • Kawennáhere Devery Jacobs (The Sun at Midnight), Best Performance • Chloé Leriche (Before the Streets), Best Director • Olivier Asselin (The Cyclotron), Best Screenplay • Mathieu Laverdière (The Cyclotron), Best Cinematography		
2017	All You Can Eat Buddha	Ian Lagarde	
2017	Allure	Carlos and Jason Sanchez	
2017	8 Minutes Ahead	Ben Hoskyn	
2017	Becoming Burlesque	Jackie English	
2017	The Cannon	Marshall Axani	
2017	Cardinals	Grayson Moore, Aidan Shipley	
2017	The Definites	Hannah Cheesman, Mackenzie Donaldson	
2017	Hochelaga, Land of Souls (Hochelaga, terre des âmes)	François Girard	
2017	Juggernaut	Daniel DiMarco	
2017	Mobile Homes	Vladimir de Fontenay	
2017	Never Saw It Coming	Gail Harvey	
2017	Nobody Famous	Sarah Rotella	
2017	Porcupine Lake	Ingrid Veninger	
2017	The Prodigal Dad	Robert Wenzek	
2017	Prodigals	Michelle Ouellet	
2017	Santa Stole Our Dog	Bryan Michael Stoller	
2017	Someone Else's Wedding	Pat Kiely	
2017	Trench 11	Leo Scherman	
2017	Tulipani, Love, Honour and a Bicycle	Mike van Diem	
2017	Venus	Eisha Marjara	
2017	Craft awards: • Evan Rachel Wood (Allure), Best Performance • Ian Lagarde (All You Can Eat Buddha), Best Director • Grayson Moore (Cardinals), Best Screenplay • Sara Mishara (Allure), Best Cinematography		
2018	A Colony (Une colonie)	Geneviève Dulude-De Celles	
2018	Acquainted	Natty Zavitz	
2018	An Audience of Chairs	Deanne Foley	
2018	Bella Ciao!	Carolyn Combs	
2018	The Dancing Dogs of Dombrova	Zack Bernbaum	
2018	Falls Around Her	Darlene Naponse	
2018	Family First (Chien de garde)	Sophie Dupuis	
2018	The Fireflies Are Gone (La Disparition des lucioles)	Sébastien Pilote	
2018	Honey Bee	Rama Rau	
2018	In God I Trust	Maja Zdanowski	
2018	Nose to Tail	Jesse Zigelstein	
2018	Red Rover	Shane Belcourt	
2018	Roobha	Lenin M. Sivam	
2018	Les Salopes, or the Naturally Wanton Pleasure of Skin (Les salopes ou le sucre naturel de la peau)	Renée Beaulieu	
2018	Sashinka	Kristina Wagenbauer	
2018	Stockholm	Robert Budreau	
2018	Trouble in the Garden	Roz Owen	
2018	Woodland	Jon Silverberg	
2018	Craft awards: • Émilie Bierre (A Colony), Best Performance • Geneviève Dulude-De Celles (A Colony), Best Director • Robert Budreau (Stockholm), Best Screenplay • Michel La Veaux (The Fireflies Are Gone), Best Cinematography		
2019	Antigone	Sophie Deraspe	
2019	Apapacho	Marquise Lepage	
2019	Black Conflux	Nicole Dorsey	
2019	Body and Bones	Melanie Oates	
2019	Canadian Strain	Geordie Sabbagh	
2019	The Cuban	Sergio Navarretta	
2019	Dreamland	Bruce McDonald	
2019	Entangled	Gaurav Seth	
2019	Fall Back Down	S. B. Edwards	
2019	From the Vine	Sean Cisterna	
2019	Guilt (Le Coupable)	Onur Karaman	
2019	Hammer	Christian Sparkes	
2019	The Marijuana Conspiracy	Craig Pryce	
2019	Promiseland	Kirk Caouette	
2019	Queen of the Morning Calm	Gloria Ui Young Kim	
2019	Spinster	Andrea Dorfman	
2019	Things I Do for Money	Warren P. Sonoda	
2019	Thunderbird	Nicholas Treeshin	
2019	Volition	Tony Dean Smith	
2019	We Had It Coming	Paul Barbeau	
2019	Craft awards: • Nahéma Ricci (Antigone), Best Performance • Sophie Deraspe (Antigone), Best Director, Best Screenplay • Celiana Cárdenas (The Cuban), Best Cinematography		

=== 2020s ===
Year	Film	Director	Ref
2020	Little Orphans	Ruth Lawrence	
2020	All-In Madonna	Arnold Lim	
2020	An Introvert's Guide to High School	Sophie Harvey	
2020	Between Waves	Virginia Abramovich	
2020	The Corruption of Divine Providence	Jeremy Torrie	
2020	Goddess of the Fireflies (La déesse des mouches à feu)	Anaïs Barbeau-Lavalette	
2020	In Her City	Carl Bessai	
2020	Indian Road Trip	Allan W. Hopkins	
2020	The Marina (La Marina)	Christophe Levac, Étienne Galloy	
2020	Mercy	Sam Flamont	
2020	Québexit	Joshua Demers	
2020	Still the Water	Susan Rodgers	
2020	Sugar Daddy	Wendy Morgan	
2020	Underground (Souterrain)	Sophie Dupuis	
2020	You Will Remember Me (Tu te souviendras de moi)	Éric Tessier	
2020	Craft awards: • Rémy Girard (You Will Remember Me), Best Performance • Sophie Dupuis (Underground), Best Director • Gail Maurice, Xavier Yuvens and Joshua Demers (Québexit), Best Screenplay • Fred Gervais-Dupuis (The Marina), Best Cinematography		
2021	Cinema of Sleep	Jeffrey St. Jules	
2021	Altar Boy	Serville Poblete	
2021	Carmen	Valerie Buhagiar	
2021	Confessions of a Hitman	Luc Picard	
2021	Dawn, Her Dad and the Tractor	Shelley Thompson	
2021	Drinkwater	Stephen Campanelli	
2021	Evelyne	Carl Bessai	
2021	Inès	Renée Beaulieu	
2021	The Inhuman (L'Inhumain)	Jason Brennan	
2021	Lune	Arturo Pérez Torres, Aviva Armour-Ostroff	
2021	The Noise of Engines (Le Bruit des moteurs)	Philippe Grégoire	
2021	Nouveau Québec	Sarah Fortin	
2021	Peace by Chocolate	Jonathan Keijser	
2021	Run Woman Run	Zoe Leigh Hopkins	
2021	We're All in This Together	Katie Boland	
2021	Craft awards: • Dayo Ade (Cinema of Sleep), Best Performance • Luc Picard (Confessions of a Hitman), Best Director • Sarah Fortin (Nouveau Québec), Best Screenplay • Diego Guijarro (Carmen), Best Cinematography		
2022	Coyote	Katherine Jerkovic	
2022	The 12 Tasks of Imelda (Les 12 travaux d’Imelda)	Martin Villeneuve	
2022	Adult Adoption	Karen Knox	
2022	Broken Angel	Jules Arita Koostachin	
2022	Colorblind	Mostafa Keshvari	
2022	Diaspora	Deco Dawson	
2022	The End of Sex	Sean Garrity	
2022	Exile	Jason James	
2022	Lissa's Trip	Jeffery Lando	
2022	Niagara	Guillaume Lambert	
2022	Midnight at the Paradise	Vanessa Matsui	
2022	Polaris	Kirsten Carthew	
2022	Rodeo (Rodéo)	Joëlle Desjardins Paquette	
2022	Soft-Spoken Weepy Cult Child	Irina Lord	
2022	Craft awards: • Jorge Martinez Colorado (Coyote), Best Performance • Joëlle Desjardins Paquette (Rodeo), Best Director • Guillaume Lambert (Niagara), Best Screenplay • David Schuurman (Polaris), Best Cinematography • Arthur Tarnowski (The 12 Tasks of Imelda), Best Editing		
2023	Atikamekw Suns (Soleils Atikamekw)	Chloé Leriche	
2023	The Boy in the Woods	Rebecca Snow	
2023	The Burning Season	Sean Garrity	
2023	Finality of Dusk	Madison Thomas	
2023	Hailey Rose	Sandi Somers	
2023	My Mother's Men (Les hommes de ma mère)	Anik Jean	
2023	The Nature of Love (Simple comme Sylvain)	Monia Chokri	
2023	She Talks to Strangers	Bruce Sweeney	
2023	Tell Me Why These Things Are So Beautiful (Dis-moi pourquoi ces choses sont si belles)	Lyne Charlebois	
2023	This Time	Robert Vaughn	
2023	With Love and a Major Organ	Kim Albright	
2023	Zoe.mp4	Jeremy Lutter	
2023	Craft awards: • Ensemble cast of Atikamekw Suns, Best Performance • Chloé Leriche (Atikamekw Suns), Best Direction • Jonas Chernick and Diana Frances (The Burning Season), Best Screenplay • André Turpin (The Nature of Love), Best Cinematography • Robert Swartz (The Boy in the Woods), Best Editing		
2024	Really Happy Someday	J Stevens	
2024	Aberdeen	Ryan Cooper, Eva Thomas	
2024	The Birds Who Fear Death	Sanjay Patel	
2024	Darkest Miriam	Naomi Jaye	
2024	Hunting Matthew Nichols	Markian Tarasiuk	
2024	Kryptic	Kourtney Roy	
2024	Lucky Strikes	Darcy Waite	
2024	Phoenixes (Phénix)	Jonathan Beaulieu-Cyr	
2024	Please, After You	Rob Michaels	
2024	Sway	Charlie Hamilton, Zachary Ramelan	
2024	Sweet Angel Baby	Melanie Oates	
2024	Who Do I Belong To	Meryam Joobeur	
2024	Young Werther	José Lourenço	
2024	Craft awards: • Salha Nasraoui (Who Do I Belong To), Best Performance • Gail Maurice (Aberdeen), Best Performance Honorable Mention • Jonathan Beaulieu-Cyr (Phoenixes), Best Direction • J Stevens and Breton Lalama (Really Happy Someday), Best Screenplay • Ariane Falardeau St-Amour (Phoenixes), Best Cinematography • Meryam Joobeur and Maxime Mathis (Who Do I Belong To), Best Editing		
2025	Akashi	Mayumi Yoshida	
2025	At the Place of Ghosts (Sk+te’kmujue’katik)	Bretten Hannam	
2025	The Cost of Heaven (Gagne ton ciel)	Mathieu Denis	
2025	Influencers	Kurtis David Harder	
2025	Little Lorraine	Andy Hines	
2025	Mile End Kicks	Chandler Levack	
2025	Nika and Madison	Eva Thomas	
2025	Starwalker	Corey Payette	
2025	Wrong Husband (Uiksaringitara)	Zacharias Kunuk	
2025	Youngblood	Hubert Davis	
2025	Craft awards: • Mayumi Yoshida (Akashi), Best Performance • Zacharias Kunuk (Wrong Husband), Best Direction • Chandler Levack (Mile End Kicks), Best Screenplay • Jaryl Lim (Akashi), Best Cinematography • Simone Smith (Mile End Kicks), Best Editing		
2026	Ancestral Beasts	Tim Riedel	
2026	Back in Black	Ron Murphy	
2026	The Bryce Lee Story	Arnold Lim	
2026	How We Stand	Marie Clements	
2026	In the Heart of the South	Nyla Innuksuk	
2026	Inheritance	Camille Beaudoin	
2026	Insectasy	Angus Silver	
2026	The Lightkeeper	Vic Sarin	
2026	Lucky Weekend	Kevin Alves	
2026	Queens for a Day	Chris Carter	
2026	Seahorse	Aisha Evelyna	
2026	Send the Rain	Hayley Gray, Kaayla Whachell	
2026	Seventeen	Justin Ducharme	
2026	Smudge the Blades	Cody Lightning	
2026	Strong Son	Ian Bawa	
2026	Toy Gun Bandit (Faux gun bandit)	Rémi St-Michel	
