= Warsha =

- Directed by: Dania Bdeir
- Written by: Dania Bdeir
- Produced by: Coralie Dias; Carine Ruszniewski; Pierre Sarraf
- Starring: Hassan Aqqoul; Khansa; Kamal Saleh
- Edited by: Ali J. Dalloul
- Release date: January 2022
- Running time: 15mn
- Countries: Lebanon; France

Warsha is a 2022 French-Lebanese short film directed by Dania Bdeir. The fifteen-minute short stars multidisciplinary performer Khansa, who plays a migrant worker and crane operator in Beirut. After its premiere at Sundance Film Festival, where it won the award for Best Short Film, the film has been presented in numerous international film festivals, including the Clermont-Ferrand Film Festival and the Seminci Valladolid Film Festival, where it won the Rainbow for Best Film. The short advanced to the shortlist for the 95th Academy Awards under the category of Best Live Action Short Film, but did not qualify to the final five. The short also competed in the 48th César Awards.

== Plot ==
In Beirut, a migrant worker volunteers to operate a very dangerous construction crane. Finally alone, he feels free to express his fantasies.

== Reception ==
Since its launch, the film has been selected in various festivals and academies around the world:

| Year | Festivals | Award/Category | Status |
|---|---|---|---|
| 2022 | Sundance Film Festival | Short Film Jury Award international fiction | Won |
| 2022 | IFFR Rotterdam | Best Short | Nominated |
| 2022 | Clermont-Ferrand International Short Film Festival | Grand Prix National | Nominated |
| 2022 | Clermont-Ferrand International Short Film Festival | Best Queer Short | Nominated |
| 2022 | Tampere Film Festival | Best International Fiction | Won |
| 2022 | Saguenay International Short Film Festival | Jury Prize | Won |
| 2022 | Aspen Shortsfest | Special Recognition | Won |
| 2022 | Outfest | Grand Jury Prize for Outstanding International Narrative Short | Won |
| 2022 | SXSW Film Festival | Grand Jury Award for Best Narrative Short | Nominated |
| 2022 | Zubroffka Festival | Grand Prix | Won |
| 2022 | Short Shorts Film Festival & Asia | Grand Prix | Won |
| 2022 | Whistler Film Festival | Best International ShortWork | Won |
