= Borealis (2015 film) =

2015 Canadian comedy-drama film

- Directed by: Sean Garrity
- Written by: Jonas Chernick
- Produced by: Jonas Chernick; Liz Jarvis
- Starring: Jonas Chernick; Joey King; Kevin Pollak
- Cinematography: Samy Inayeh
- Edited by: John Gurdebeke
- Music by: Ari Posner
- Production companies: Banana-Moon Sky Films; Buffalo Gal Pictures; Vigilante Productions
- Distributed by: Raven Banner Entertainment
- Release date: September 5, 2015 (MWFF)
- Running time: 95 minutes
- Country: Canada
- Language: English

Borealis is a 2015 Canadian comedy-drama film, directed by Sean Garrity.

The film stars Jonas Chernick as Jonah Finn, a man from Winnipeg, Manitoba whose daughter Aurora (Joey King) suffers from a degenerative eye disease, who takes her on a road trip to Churchill to see the Northern Lights before she goes blind; however, the duo are simultaneously pursued by Tubby (Kevin Pollak), a loan shark to whom Jonah owes $100,000 in gambling debt. The cast also includes Jake Epstein, Emily Hampshire, Greg Bryk and Clé Bennett.

Chernick, the film's screenwriter, wrote the film after his wife responded to My Awkward Sexual Adventure, his prior collaboration with Garrity, by asking him to make a film they could actually let their young daughter see. His original idea had been for the road trip to be to Tofino, British Columbia, but changed the destination to Churchill after realizing that several other movies, including Going the Distance and Foreverland, had already depicted characters taking road trips to Tofino.

== Reception ==
The film has a user rating of 5.6 due to mixed critic reviews on IMDb. Darren Wall received a Canadian Screen Award nomination for Best Visual Effects at the 4th Canadian Screen Awards in 2016.
