= Sarah Fortin =

Canadian film director and screenwriter

Sarah Fortin is a Canadian film director and screenwriter from Quebec, whose debut feature film Nouveau Québec was released in 2021.

At the 2021 Whistler Film Festival, Fortin won both the Alliance of Women Film Journalists's EDA Award for best narrative feature directed by a woman, and the Borsos Competition award for Best Screenplay for a Canadian film.

A graduate of the Université du Québec à Montréal, she previously directed the short films Deux enfants qui fument (2004), Synthétiseur (2009) and Le fleuve à droite (2010), the documentary films Stephen Faulkner: J'm'en va r'viendre (2011) and Du hockey propre: petite histoire d'un film culte (2016), and episodes of the television documentary series Taverne (2013) and En marge du monde (2019).
