= Exiles in Lotusland =

- French: Le méchant trip
- Directed by: Ilan Saragosti
- Written by: Ilan Saragosti
- Produced by: Claudette Jaiko
- Starring: Mélissa Cossette; Dany Nadeau
- Cinematography: Ilan Saragosti; Kirk Tougas; Marc Gadoury
- Edited by: Natacha Dufaux
- Music by: Jonathan Lander; Avrum Nadigel
- Production company: National Film Board of Canada
- Release date: December 3, 2005 (Whistler)
- Running time: 70 minutes
- Country: Canada
- Languages: English; French

Exiles in Lotusland (French: Le méchant trip) is a Canadian documentary film, directed by Ilan Saragosti and released in 2005. The film centres on Mélissa "Mélo" Cossette and Dany "Ti-Criss" Nadeau, two homeless teenagers from Quebec who have moved to Vancouver, where they are supporting themselves as squeegee kids.

The film premiered at the 2005 Whistler Film Festival, where it won the Borsos Competition award for Best Canadian Film.
