= Cardinals (film) =

2017 Canadian film

- Film poster
- Directed by: Grayson Moore; Aidan Shipley
- Written by: Grayson Moore
- Produced by: Marianna Margaret; Kristy Neville
- Starring: Sheila McCarthy; Noah Reid; Katie Boland; Grace Glowicki
- Cinematography: Jackson Parrell
- Edited by: Daniel Haack
- Music by: Todor Kobakov
- Production companies: Wildling Pictures; Touchpoint Films
- Release date: 7 September 2017 (TIFF)
- Running time: 84 minutes
- Country: Canada
- Language: English

Cardinals is a 2017 Canadian thriller film directed by Grayson Moore and Aidan Shipley. The film stars Sheila McCarthy as Valerie Walker, a woman who has just recently been released from prison after killing a coworker in a drunk driving incident, when Mark (Noah Reid), the son of the man she killed, shows up on her doorstep demanding answers of his own.

Cardinals, part of Telefilm Canada's Micro-Budget Production Program, was filmed in Stratford, Kitchener, and Barrie, Ontario.

The film premiered in the Discovery section at the 2017 Toronto International Film Festival.

== Cast ==
- Sheila McCarthy as Valerie Walker
- Katie Boland as Eleanor Walker
- Grace Glowicki as Zoe Walker
- Noah Reid as Mark Loekner
- Peter MacNeill as Jim Walker
- Peter Spence as Jonah Pastekh

== Awards ==
At the 2017 Whistler Film Festival, Moore won the award for Best Screenplay in a Borsos Competition Film.

For her performance as Valerie Walker, Sheila McCarthy won the 2018 ACTRA Toronto Award for Outstanding Performance, Female.
