= Vital Signs (2009 film) =

2009 Canadian drama film

- French: Les signes vitaux
- Directed by: Sophie Deraspe
- Written by: Sophie Deraspe
- Produced by: Nicolas Fonseca
- Starring: Marie-Hélène Bellavance; Francis Ducharme; Marie Brassard
- Cinematography: Sophie Deraspe
- Edited by: S. Madeleine Leblanc
- Music by: Jean-François Laporte; Krista Muir
- Production company: Les Films Siamois
- Release date: October 3, 2009 (FNC)
- Running time: 87 minutes
- Country: Canada
- Language: French

Vital Signs (French: Les signes vitaux) is a Canadian drama film, directed by Sophie Deraspe and released in 2009. The film stars Marie-Hélène Bellavance as Simone, a young woman who responds to the death of her grandmother by abandoning her university studies to volunteer as a caregiver for the dying in a palliative care centre, while simultaneously juggling her casual relationship with musician Boris (Francis Ducharme).

The cast also includes Marie Brassard, Suzanne St-Michel, Danielle Ouimet and Danielle Fichaud.

The film was noted for the casting of Bellavance, a double leg amputee, in a role where her disability was part of the fabric of the character's life but not the primary narrative focus of the story, as well as for depicting Simone as a character who still had a sexual life instead of the more common film portrayal of disability as a barrier to sexuality.

The film premiered at the Festival du nouveau cinéma in October 2009. It was subsequently screened at the Whistler Film Festival, where it won the Borsos Competition for Best Canadian Feature Film and Bellavance won the award for Best Performance in a Canadian Film. It went into general theatrical release in 2010.

The film received three Prix Jutra nominations at the 13th Jutra Awards in 2011, for Best Film, Best Supporting Actress (Brassard) and Best Make-Up (Joan-Patricia Parris).
