= River (2007 film) =

2007 Canadian film directed by Mark Wihak

- Directed by: Mark Wihak
- Written by: Maya Batten-Young; Adam Budd; Mark Wihak
- Produced by: Mark Wihak
- Starring: Maya Batten-Young; Adam Budd
- Cinematography: Patrick McLaughlin
- Edited by: Wanda Schmockel
- Music by: Eric Chenaux; Michelle McAdorey
- Production company: Chat Perdue!
- Distributed by: IndieFlix
- Release date: August 28, 2007 (MWFF)
- Running time: 80 minutes
- Country: Canada
- Language: English

River is a Canadian drama film, directed by Mark Wihak and released in 2007. The film stars Maya Batten-Young and Adam Budd as Roz and Stan, two young adult artists in Regina, Saskatchewan who meet and become close friends.

The film was shot in 2006, using improvisational techniques of dialogue and character development.

The film premiered in August 2007 at the Montreal World Film Festival. It was subsequently screened at the 2007 Whistler Film Festival, where Batten-Young won the Borsos Competition award for Best Actress in a Canadian Film. At the Canadian Filmmakers' Festival in 2008, the film won the Reel Canadian Indie Award and the award for Best Screenplay, and Budd was named Best Actor.
