= Blood pressure (disambiguation) =

Blood pressure sometimes referred to as arterial blood pressure, the pressure exerted by circulating blood upon the walls of blood vessels

Blood pressure may also refer to:

- Hypertension, also known as high blood pressure
- Blood Pressure (film), a 2012 Canadian film
- Blood Pressures, the fourth studio album by indie rock band The Kills
- Blood Pressure, a 1930 short story by Damon Runyon
