= Miranda Collins =

Miranda Collins may refer to:

- Miranda Collins, fictional character in Ravenswood (TV series) and Pretty Little Liars
- Miranda Collins, fictional character in Flashpoint played by Michelle Giroux
