= Nouveau Québec (film) =

- Directed by: Sarah Fortin
- Written by: Sarah Fortin
- Produced by: Gabrielle Tougas-Fréchette; Guillaume Vasseur
- Starring: Christine Beaulieu; Jean-Sébastien Courchesne
- Cinematography: Vincent Gonneville
- Edited by: Guillaume Fortin
- Music by: Olivier Fairfield; Simon Trottier
- Production company: Voyelles Films
- Release date: October 9, 2021 (FNC)
- Running time: 96 minutes
- Country: Canada
- Language: French

Nouveau Québec is a Canadian drama film, directed by Sarah Fortin and released in 2021. The film stars Christine Beaulieu and Jean-Sébastien Courchesne as Sophie and Mathieu, a couple whose relationship is tested by their differing reactions to being exposed to First Nations culture while visiting the remote northern town of Schefferville, Quebec.

The film premiered in October 2021 at the Festival du nouveau cinéma. It was subsequently screened at the 2021 Whistler Film Festival, where Fortin won both the Alliance of Women Film Journalists's EDA Award for best narrative feature directed by a woman, and the Borsos Competition award for Best Screenplay for a Canadian film.

The film received two Canadian Screen Award nominations at the 11th Canadian Screen Awards in 2023, for Best Supporting Performance in a Film (Jean-Luc Kanapé) and Best Cinematography (Vincent Gonneville).
