= Best Queer Short Award =

Annual film award

Best Queer Short (French: Prix du Queer métrage) is an annual film award presented by the Clermont-Ferrand International Short Film Festival, to honor the year's best LGBTQ-themed short film in each year's festival program. The award was created in 2022, as a collaboration between Clermont-Ferrand and the Cannes Film Festival's Queer Palm jury.

== Winners and nominees ==
Year	Film	Director	Ref
2022	A Free Run (Un corps brûlant)	Lauriane Lagarde	
2022	5pm Seaside (17h au bord de la mer)	Valentin Stejskal	
2022	Ambasciatori	Francesco Romano	
2022	Catcave Hysteria (Tjejtoan 4-ever)	Angelika Abramovitch	
2022	How to Breathe Out of Water (Como respirar fora d'água)	Victoria Negreiros Guedes, Júlia Dordetti Fávero	
2022	Islands in the City (Die Geheimnisvollen Inseln)	Marian Freistuehler	
2022	Leo by Night (Léo la nuit)	Nans Laborde-Jourdàa	
2022	Lonely Cowgirl (Ensom cowgirl)	Gina Kippenbroeck	
2022	Masquerade (Egúngún)	Olive Nwosu	
2022	Prosopagnosia	Steven Fraser	
2022	São Paulo Open Wound	Elizabeth Rocha Salgado	
2022	Thursday Friday Saturday (Jeudi vendredi samedi)	Arthur Cahn	
2022	Voyage à Santarém	Laure Desmazières	
2022	Warsha	Dania Bdeir	
2023	An Avocado Pit (Um caroço de abacate)	Ary Zara	
2023	9th Floor to the Right (9e étage droite)	Andréa Romano	
2023	Aban	Abbas Taheri, Mahdieh Toosi	
2023	The Age of Innocence	Maximilian Bungarten	
2023	Bell in a Land of Wonders (Cloche petite aux merveilles du pays)	Anthony Brining	
2023	Burial of Life as a Young Girl (Des jeunes filles enterrent leur vie)	Maïté Sonnet	
2023	But What Does It Mean?	Julie Ecoffey	
2023	Colony Collapse Disorder (Hafra'at hitmotetut hamoshava)	Amos Holzman	
2023	Fire at the Lake (Le Feu au lac)	Pierre Menahem	
2023	Hideous	Yann Gonzalez	
2023	I'm on Fire	Michael Spiccia	
2023	The King Who Contemplated the Sea (Le Roi qui contemplait la mer)	Jean Sébastien Chauvin	
2023	Life in Canada (La Vie au Canada)	Frédéric Rosset	
2023	The Melting Creatures (Las Criaturas que se derriten bajo el sol)	Diego Céspedes	
2023	Pentola	Leo Cernic	
2023	Repair	Bertil Nilsson	
2023	Something Ever Missing (S'il-vous-plaît arrêtez tous de disparaître)	Laura Thomassaint	
2023	The Struggle Is the End (La Lutte est une fin)	Arthur Thomas-Pavlowsky	
2023	Swan in the Center (Swan dans le centre)	Iris Chassaigne	
2023	Will You Look at Me	Shuli Huang	
2024	Worlds Burning Amid the Shadows (Entre las sombras arden mundos)	Ismael García Ramírez	
2024	Saigon Kiss	Hồng Anh Nguyễn	
2024	Note: A source has not been located to provide a full list of all films in contention this year.		
2025	Are You Scared to Be Yourself Because You Think That You Might Fail?	Bec Pecaut	
2025	Automagic	Ashok Vish	
2025	Big Boys Don't Cry	Arnaud Delmarle	
2025	The Exploding Girl (La fille qui explose)	Caroline Poggi, Jonathan Vinel	
2025	Familiar	Marco Novoa	
2025	The Fishbowl Girl	Hung Yi Wu	
2025	Les Fleurs bleues	Louis Douillez	
2025	Héliogabale	Arthur Chopin	
2025	Hi Mom, It's Me, Lou Lou (Merhaba Anne, Benim, Lou Lou)	Atakan Yilmaz	
2025	Nous les prochains	Florent Gouëlou	
2025	Ruth	Sonia Martí Gallego	
2025	Sauna Day	Anna Hints, Tushar Prakash	
2025	Sweeter Is the Night (Plus douce est la nuit)	Fabienne Wagenaar	
2025	Two People Exchanging Saliva (Deux personnes échangeant de la salive)	Natalie Musteata, Alexandre Singh	
2025	Violeta	Xavier Champagnac	
2026	Birthmark	George Peter Barbari	
2026	Buah (The Fruit)	Jen Nee Lim	
