= Marie-Hélène Bellavance =

Canadian artist, actress and dancer

Marie-Hélène Bellavance is a Canadian artist, actress and dancer. She is most noted for her performance in the 2009 film Vital Signs (Les signes vitaux), for which she won the Borsos Competition award for Best Performance in a Canadian Film at the 2009 Whistler Film Festival.

Bellavance, a double amputee who lost both of her lower legs in childhood, studied fine arts at Montreal's Concordia University. Her artistic practice has centred predominantly around representation of disability, including in visual art, dance and choreography. She is the artistic director of Corpuscule Danse, a dance company built around dancers with disabilities.

In Vital Signs, her debut film performance, she received praise in part for her willingness to appear in a nude scene in which her amputations were not hidden from view.

In 2021 she appeared in Annie Leclair's short documentary film Grounded (Enracinée).
