= Raphaël Lacaille =

Canadian actor from Quebec

Raphaël Lacaille is a Canadian actor from Quebec. He is most noted for his performance in the 2010 film Jo for Jonathan (Jo pour Jonathan), for which he won the Borsos Competition award for best actor in a Canadian film at the 2010 Whistler Film Festival.

He has also appeared in the television series Trauma, 19-2, Les Jaunes, L'Écrivain public and Adulthood, and the films L'Affaire Dumont, The Urban Farm (La ferme des humains), Kiss Me Like a Lover (Embrasse-moi comme tu m'aimes), Hochelaga, Land of Souls (Hochelaga, Terre des âmes) and Guilt.

He is in a relationship with Élisabeth Léger, a singer who competed on the third season of La Voix.
