= Grayson Moore =

Canadian screenwriter and filmmaker

Grayson Moore is a Canadian screenwriter and filmmaker, most noted as the writer and co-director of the 2017 film Cardinals.

Although Moore wrote the film on his own, he co-directed it with Aidan Shipley. Moore won the award for Best Screenplay in a Borsos Competition film at the 2017 Whistler Film Festival. He previously won the award for Best Canadian ShortWork at Whistler in 2014, for his short film, Running Season.

Moore, Shipley, Connor Illsley, and Jon Riera won the Canadian Screen Award for Best Direction in a Web Program or Series at the 7th Canadian Screen Awards in 2019, for the short film Deerbrook.

Moore is a native of Kitchener, Ontario, and a graduate of the film studies program at Ryerson University.
