= Boy Meets Girl (1998 film) =

1998 romantic comedy fantasy film directed by Jerry Ciccoritti

- Directed by: Jerry Ciccoritti
- Written by: Doug Bagot; Timothy Lee
- Produced by: Stavros C. Stavrides
- Starring: Sean Astin; Emily Hampshire; Kevin McDonald; Joe Mantegna; Kate Nelligan
- Cinematography: David Perrault
- Edited by: James Bredin
- Music by: John McCarthy
- Production company: ARTO-pelli Motion Pictures III Inc.
- Release date: September 12, 1998 (Canada)
- Running time: 99 minutes (Canada); 102 minutes (U.S.)
- Countries: Canada; United States
- Language: English

Boy Meets Girl is a 1998 romantic comedy fantasy film directed by Jerry Ciccoritti, starring Sean Astin and Emily Hampshire.

== Plot summary ==
Angelina (Emily Hampshire) is a shy and whimsical waitress forced to leave her home in Italy to be married to a man she is not in love with in order to fulfill a family vow. After Angelina moves into a new neighborhood in Little Italy, Toronto, she is torn with the idea of marrying a man she is not in love with. However, in the days leading up to Valentine's Day, Angelina encounters Mike (Sean Astin) and the two seemingly are shot with Cupid's arrows. Angelina and Mike's searches for love come to an end after realizing how connected they truly are to each other.

== Cast ==
- Sean Astin – Mike
- Emily Hampshire – Angelina Milleflores
- Kevin McDonald – Jack
- Joe Mantegna – Il Magnifico
- Kate Nelligan – Mrs. Jones
- Sook-Yin Lee- Judy
- Mary Long – Aunt Zia
- Louis Di Bianco – Cardini
- Joseph Scoren – Paolo

== Awards and nominations ==
- Genie Award nomination, 2000: Best Achievement in Art Direction/Production Design (John Dondertman and Patricia Cuccia)
