= The End of Sex =

2022 Canadian romantic comedy film

- Film poster
- Directed by: Sean Garrity
- Written by: Jonas Chernick
- Produced by: Justin Rebelo
- Starring: Jonas Chernick; Emily Hampshire
- Cinematography: Sasha Moric
- Edited by: John Gurdebeke
- Music by: Ari Posner
- Production company: Vortex Productions
- Distributed by: Vortex Media
- Release date: September 10, 2022 (TIFF)
- Running time: 87 minutes
- Country: Canada
- Language: English
- Box office: $54,527

The End of Sex is a 2022 Canadian romantic comedy film, directed by Sean Garrity. The film stars Jonas Chernick and Emily Hampshire as Josh and Emma, a young married couple who are feeling pressured by the demands of parenthood, and ship their kids off to camp so that they can embark on a series of sexual adventures to reignite the passion in their relationship.

The cast also includes Gray Powell, Lily Gao, Melanie Scrofano, and Pedro Miguel Arce.

The film was shot in Hamilton, Ontario, in early 2022.

The film premiered at the Toronto International Film Festival on September 10, 2022. It also screened in the Borsos Competition at the 2022 Whistler Film Festival.

Ari Posner received a Canadian Screen Award nomination for Best Original Score at the 11th Canadian Screen Awards in 2023.

== Cast ==
- Jonas Chernick as Josh
- Emily Hampshire as Emma
- Lily Gao as Kelly
- Gray Powell as Marlon
- Pedro Miguel Arce as Jory
- Melanie Scrofano as Wendy
- Steven McCarthy as Gary
- Eden Cupid as Aisha
- Emily Watt as Dawn

== Reception ==
On the review aggregator website Rotten Tomatoes, 59% of 29 critics' reviews are positive, with an average rating of 5.8/10. The website's consensus reads: "Generally amusing in spite of its predictable approach to marital doldrums, The End of Sex offers an earnest yet often awkward look at intimacy."
