= Point Blank (TV series) =

Canadian television comedy series

- Starring: Linda Cullen; Bob Robertson
- Country of origin: Canada

Original release
- Network: CTV Comedy Channel
- Release: 2002

Point Blank is a Canadian television comedy series that aired on The Comedy Network in 2002.

Evolving out of the earlier Double Exposure, the show starred Linda Cullen and Bob Robertson as Diane-Barbara Jane and Steele Drummond, respectively, the anchors of a television tabloid newsmagazine which covered news stories, such as alien abduction, human cloning, styrofoam mining and two-ply toilet paper, that went "beyond the truth and below the standards". Cullen and Robertson were the show's sole constant core cast, while a wide variety of Canadian comedians and actors made appearances as characters or journalists in news reports.

Thirteen episodes of the series were produced and aired.

== Cast ==
- Tammy Bentz - Macarthur Fantutti
- Mark Brandon - Rock Granite
- Save Cameron - Yannick Paduch
- Nicola Crosbie - Kitty Cowlick
- Diana Frances - Trinity Whiskers
- Jason Emanuel - Luiz Emilio de Pollo
- Andrew Grose - Turdmore Hacking
- Roger Haskett - Medgar O'Hill
- Campbell Lane - Harry Flotsam
- Marjorie Malpass - Phoebe Torque
- Dagmar Midcap - Herpzibah Fridge
- John Murphy - Chase Bullion
- Trish Pattenden - Sandy Stout
- Jeff Rechner - Announcer
- Yvonne Myers - Sh'lwannalah Jackson
- Tanya Reid - Rain Bongwater
- Chris Robson - Maytag Hogswallop
- Ben Wilkinson - Julian Van Wart
- Moishe Teichman - Mayor
