= Romy and Michele: In the Beginning =

- Promotional poster
- Written by: Robin Schiff
- Directed by: Robin Schiff
- Starring: Katherine Heigl; Alexandra Breckenridge; Kelly Brook; Scott Vickaryous; Nat Faxon; Dania Ramirez; Alexandra Billings; Rhea Seehorn; William Ragsdale; Paula Abdul
- Music by: Steve Bartek
- Country of origin: United States
- Original language: English

Production
- Producer: Kevin Inch
- Cinematography: Russ T. Alsobrook
- Editor: John Axness
- Running time: 86 minutes
- Production companies: Bungalow 78 Productions; Palm Tree Productions; Touchstone Television

Original release
- Network: ABC Family
- Release: May 30, 2005

Romy and Michele: In the Beginning is a 2005 American television film and backdoor pilot starring Katherine Heigl as Romy and Alexandra Breckenridge as Michele, with a special appearance by Paula Abdul. It is a prequel to the 1997 film Romy and Michele's High School Reunion and is the second installment in the Romy and Michele film series. Written and directed by Robin Schiff, its working title was Romy and Michele: Behind the Velvet Rope. The film premiered on ABC Family on May 30, 2005.

== Plot ==
In this prequel to Romy and Michele's High School Reunion, it shows Romy and Michele as they graduate in 1987, and again three years later as they take on Los Angeles.

For years Romy and Michele have been dreaming to move to L.A. and become rich and famous, but they decided to put their move on hold while they save money. Three years have passed by and they've only managed to save $68, only $8 more than they had in high school. Despite their lack of money, they decide to go ahead with their plans to move to L.A. after seeing Pretty Woman. As the girls arrive in L.A., they decide to become prostitutes but chicken out after their first encounter with a client. As they walk home, a man lends them a dollar for a vending machine, and Romy and Michele are arrested for prostitution.

== Cast ==
- Katherine Heigl as Romy White
- Alexandra Breckenridge as Michele Weinberger
- Kelly Brook as Linda Fashiobella
- Scott Vickaryous as Taylor Bradley
- Nat Faxon as Chad
- Dania Ramirez as Elena
- Alexandra Billings as Donna
- Rhea Seehorn as Ashley Schwartz
- Paula Abdul as Herself
- William Ragsdale as Kevin
- Leigh Curran as Doctor
- Leslie Intriago as Katie
- Amanda Righetti as Friendly Girl
- D.J. Lockhart-Johnson as Rafael
- Tim Maculan as Ned
- Paul Tigue as John
