= Bunks (film) =

2013 Canadian horror comedy television film

- Genre: Fantasy; Zombie comedy Horror
- Directed by: Tibor Takács
- Starring: Dylan Schmid; Aidan Shipley; Emilia McCarthy; Atticus Mitchell; Christian Potenza; Zane Davis; Michael Levinson; Nicholas Bode; Drew Davis; Grant Westerholm
- Country of origin: Canada
- Original language: English

Production
- Executive producers: Brian Irving; Jennifer Pertsch; Tom McGillis; Bob Higgins
- Producers: Brian Irving; Ian Dimerman; Brendon Sawatzky
- Cinematography: Michael Marshall
- Editor: Ellen Fine
- Running time: 81 minutes
- Production companies: Fresh TV; Inferno Pictures Inc. FremantleMedia Enterprises

Original release
- Network: Disney XD
- Release: October 27, 2013

Bunks is a 2013 Canadian fantasy horror zombie comedy television film produced by Fresh TV and broadcast on the Canadian version of Disney XD on October 27, 2013. It includes actors Dylan Schmid, Atticus Mitchell, Leigh Truant, Aidan Shipley, and more. It was broadcast on October 27, 2013. It was filmed in Kenora, Ontario.

== Plot ==
In 1972, a young camper at Camp Whispering Lake tries to find his other campmates but gets frightened and runs off into the woods. He finds an old cabin and attempts to hide from an unseen force. The police later arrive to find them (the campers). However, they have all disappeared.

In the present, brothers Dylan and Dane are being sent to the military camp after previously lighting their house on fire with a rocket they bought with their mother's credit card. During pickup for camps, they manipulate two camp counselors from Camp Bushwhack into taking their place at military camp, and the brothers take their place and go to Camp Bushwhack by posing as Sanjay and Delroy.

Immediately upon arriving at Camp Bushwack, the boys realize they are responsible for a dysfunctional cabin while Dane starts a rivalry with another cabin counselor, Brogan. To get back at Brogan, the brothers and their bunkmates hide Brogan's trophy, "the Nameless Cup," in an old cabin, where they find a creepy old backpack with a book filled with scary stories. However, unknown to them, the cabin is also the same cabin the camper from 1972 hid in.

When the brothers decide to tell the scary stories at a campfire, they find a story in the book about Anson Miner, who was a counselor at Camp Whispering Lake (Camp Bushwack's original name). In the story, Anson drowns, and his friends attempt to save him by taking him to an animal doctor. The doctor succeeds in bringing him back to life, but Anson returns as a brain-eating zombie and kills the doctor. Anson infects everyone, but luckily everyone is cured, but because Anson was undead for so long, the antidote does not work on him. The next day, Dylan notices strange occurrences happening in camp- a counselor girl (who Dylan likes) named Lauren grew a mustache (like one of the stories he and Dane told), and he spots Anson in the woods.

Dylan goes to ask the camp manager, Crawl, about the no-telling-scary-stories rule at camp. Crawl reveals something strange happened a while back when Camp Bushwack was Camp Whispering Lake, where all the campers disappeared without a trace, so they made a policy to tell no scary stories (it is a high chance that the book was most likely responsible). After learning this, Dylan attempts to warn everyone at the campfire, but nobody listens to him. On a hike, Dane does not believe Dylan as well when he warns him and the campers but quickly believes after being attacked by Anson.

Dane, Dylan, and the rest of their cabin discover that the scary stories begin to come true, and they try to go to the animal hospital to hide from Anson. They give Anson a remote-controlled collar, which does not turn him back into a human but helps him recover his old personality before becoming a zombie. Despite Anson's cool persona, Dylan decides to keep him in the hospital so he does not hurt any of the campers at Camp Bushwack. Meanwhile, Brogan tries to find the Nameless Cup by looking in the hospital but encounters Anson and breaks the remote, which quickly reverts Anson back to his zombie ways.

When the brothers and the campers return to camp, Anson and Brogan (bitten by Anson) attack them. The boys drive off the zombies while Dylan goes to search for any remaining campers, but Dane reveals he got scratched during the battle. After finding Lauren, Dylan and Dane send two campers- Genius Bar and Grinsberg- back to the hospital to find the antidote. They succeed, and the real Sanjay and Delroy (who escaped from the boot camp) join in.

Using the antidote Genius Bar made, the brothers cure all of the zombie-turned campers. Dane turns into one of the zombies but is quickly cured. Everyone celebrates by doing a Hawaiian party, and the brothers burn the book. However, unknown to them, one of the counselors- Alice- read all the stories aloud in the book by accident, including one about a shark in the lake, which may indicate that the campers may fall victim to it in the future.

== Cast ==
- Dylan Schmid as Dylan O' Reilly
- Aidan Shipley as Dane O' Reilly
- Emilia McCarthy as Lauren
- Atticus Mitchell as Wookiee
- Christian Potenza as Crawl
- Zane Davis as "Genius Bar"
- Michael Levinson as "Hollywood"
- Nicholas Bode as "Twilight"
- Drew Davis as Carl "Grinsberg"
- Grant Westerholm as "Cheeseburger"
- Leigh Truant as Alice
- Ferron Guerreiro as Jan
- Markian Tarasiuk as Brogan
- Aaron Hale as Delroy
- Varun Saranga as Sanjay
- Tom Keenan as Anson Minor

== Soundtrack ==
1. "One Last Night" by Jesse Labelle featuring Nixon
2. "For The Last Time" by Sink To See
3. "Say My Name" by Patrick Cooke
4. "Now I'm Free" by Jono Brown & Jaco Caraco
5. "Glitter Blues" by Vibrolux
6. "Sunrise" by Mothboxer

== Broadcast ==
It premiered on Disney XD in the US on June 16, 2014.
