= Inertia (film) =

2001 film by Sean Garrity

- Directed by: Sean Garrity
- Written by: Sean Garrity
- Starring: Jonas Chernick; Sarah Constible; Gordon Tanner; Micheline Marchildon
- Release date: September 12, 2001 (TIFF)
- Running time: 92 minutes
- Country: Canada
- Language: English

Inertia is a 2001 Canadian drama film, directed by Sean Garrity.

The film stars Jonas Chernick, Sarah Constible, Gordon Tanner and Micheline Marchildon as Joseph, Laura, Bruce and Alex, four young professionals in Winnipeg, Manitoba who are embroiled in a "love rhombus" in which each is in unrequited love with one of the others.

The film won the award for Best Canadian First Feature Film at the 2001 Toronto International Film Festival,
