= Graham Abbey =

Canadian actor

- Born: Graham Robert Thomson Abbey; March 24, 1971 (age 55); Toronto, Ontario, Canada
- Years active: 1983-present
- Spouse: Michelle Giroux

Graham Abbey (born Graham Robert Thomson Abbey, March 24, 1971) is a Canadian film, television and stage actor, who is best known for his role as Gray Jackson in TV drama The Border.

== Early life and education ==
At the then Stratford Festival of Canada, the eleven-year-old Graham Abbey took up small parts in A Midsummer Night's Dream and The Merry Wives of Windsor. In the following season, he returned with roles in As You Like It and Macbeth. His first role was as a forest gnome at the Festival Theatre, and he explained his interest as: "there was a room full of doughnuts and I got to get out of school".

After two years at Stratford, he gave up acting. He left Stratford Central Secondary School, moved to Kingston, Ontario, and in 1994, graduated from Queen's University with a degree in political science.

== Career ==
In 1997, he rejoined the Stratford Festival with a leading role (Happy Loman in Death of a Salesman), a supporting role (Paris in Romeo and Juliet), and an ensemble role (the Chorus in Oedipus Rex). He has performed in over 30 productions at the Festival, and continues to be a part of the company as of 2016, during which season he debuted his adaptation of Shakespeare's Henriad, Breath of Kings

== Personal life ==
In August 2008, he married former Stratford colleague Michelle Giroux.

== Credits ==
=== Film and television ===
- As You Like It (1984), based on the 1983 production at the Stratford Festival of Canada—Page
- John Woo's Once a Thief (1998) — Special Agent Elk Diller in episode "The Director Files"
- Offstage, Onstage: Inside the Stratford Festival (2002), the National Film Board behind-the-scenes at the Stratford Festival of Canada's 49th season — himself
- The Madness of King Richard (2003), interviews with members of the theatre community, regarding the Stratford Festival of Canada under artistic director Richard Monette — himself
- 'Til Death Do Us Part (2007) — Slade in episode "Funeral Parlour Murder"
- The Jane Show (2007) — Richard in episode "Who's Got Spirit?"
- Billable Hours (2007) — Scott in episode "Monopoly Man, the Second"
- Heartland (2007) — Steve Redding in episode "Coming Home"
- Degrassi: The Next Generation — Glen Martin
- The Border (2008) — Gray Jackson
- Othello: The Tragedy of the Moor (2008) — Michael Cassio
- A Wake (2009) - Tyler
- Stealing Paradise TV film (2011) - Steven Collier
- Republic of Doyle (2012) — George
- King John (2015) — King Philip
- Angels and Ornaments (2014) - Dave
- Frontier (2016) - MacLaughlan
- Stay the Night (2022)
- Black Phone 2 (2025) - Kenneth

=== Stratford Festival ===
- Much Ado About Nothing (2023) -- Benedick
- "Coriolanus" (2018) -- Tullus Aufidius
- "Tartuffe" (2017) -- Orgon
- King John (play) (2014) -- Philip the Bastard
- Othello (2013) -- Iago
- Coriolanus (2006) -- Tullus Aufidius
- The Lark (2005) -- Warwick, Earl of Beauchamp
- As You Like It (2005) -- Jacques
- King Henry VIII (All is True) (2004) -- King Henry VIII
- Macbeth (2004) -- Macbeth
- Love's Labour's Lost (2003) -- Berowne
- The Taming of the Shrew (2003) -- Petruchio
- Richard III, Reign of Terror (2002) -- King Henry VII, Earl of Richmond
- The Scarlet Pimpernel (2002) -- Lambert
- Romeo and Juliet (2002) -- Romeo
- Henry V (2001) -- King Henry V
- Henry IV, Part 2 (2001) -- Henry, Prince of Wales
- Henry IV, Part 1 (2001) -- Henry, Prince of Wales
- The Three Musketeers (2000) -- D'Artagnan
- The Importance of Being Earnest (2000) -- Algernon Montford
- Hamlet (2000) -- Laertes
- The School for Scandal (1999) -- Sir Toby Bumper
- The Tempest (1999) -- Ferdinand
- A Midsummer Night's Dream (1999) -- Lysander
- Two Gentlemen of Verona (1998) -- Valentine
- The Winter's Tale (1998) -- Florizel
- A Man for All Seasons (1998) -- William Roper
- Oedipus Rex (1997) -- Chorus
- Death of a Salesman (1997) -- Happy Loman
- Romeo and Juliet (1997) -- Paris
- As You Like It (1983) -- Page
- Macbeth (1983) -- Young Macduff (understudy)
- A Midsummer Night's Dream (1982) -- Appears in
- The Merry Wives of Windsor (1982) -- Forest Gnome

=== Other theatre ===
- The Pessimist, Tarragon Theatre, Toronto (2007) -- Philip
- Long Day's Journey Into Night, Manitoba Theatre Centre, Winnipeg (2005) -- Jamie
- Death of a Salesman, Theatre Aquarius (2004) -- Biff Loman
- The Molière Comedies, Shubert Theatre, Chicago (2003) -- Valère
- Robin Hood: The Merry Family Musical, Elgin Theatre, Toronto (2002) -- Robin Hood
- Snow White and the Magnificent Seven, Elgin Theatre, Toronto (2001) -- Prince Don "Squeeze the" Charming
- Proposals, Manitoba Theatre Centre, Winnipeg/Royal Alexandra Theatre, Toronto (1998) -- Ray Dolenz
- Hello, Dolly!, York Minstrels, Toronto (1995) -- Cornelius Hackl
- The School for Scandal, Chicago Shakespeare Theatre—Charles Surface
- A Midsummer Night's Dream, Festival of Classics, Toronto—Demetrius
- The Baker's Wife, Equity Showcase, Toronto—Antoine
- A Streetcar Named Desire, Firehall Theatre, Gananoque, Ontario—Stanley Kowalski
- Guys and Dolls, Grand Theatre, Kingston, Ontario—Nicely-Nicely
- Fiddler on the Roof, Grand Theatre, Kingston, Ontario—Motel the Tailor
