= Diana Frances (comedian) =

Canadian comedian

- Born: Diana Frances Clent
- Education: Douglas College
- Occupations: Comedian, writer, business manager
- Website: dianafrances.ca

Diana Frances (born Diana Frances Clent) is a Canadian comedian, writer, and business manager. She has written and performed comedy for stage, television and radio for three decades, and served as the managing director of the Vancouver-based Rock Paper Scissors comedy collective. Her writing has been recognized with a Canadian Screen Award and a Writers Guild of Canada Award, and she has also been nominated for a Gemini Award and nine Canadian Comedy Awards.

== Early life and education ==
Diana Frances Clent moved from Langley to Maple Ridge, British Columbia, when she was 13, after what she later described as a "rather traumatic family shake-up". She was adopted and lived with her aunt and uncle while attending Maple Ridge Secondary School. She took drama courses and initially pursued dramatic Shakespearean acting, but was repeatedly cast in comedic roles and was thrilled by the audience response. She studied theatre at Douglas College. As she entered the entertainment business, she dropped her surname which she felt sounded like "a cartoon sound effect".

== Career ==
Frances joined the Vancouver Theatresports League, where she learned improvisational techniques. Her quick wit gained her a place in the Rock Paper Scissors (RPS) comedy collective. In 1991, she replaced an actor in the RPS production A Twisted Christmas Carol, an improvisational play based around a framework of the Dickens classic. She returned to be a part of every seasonal production of the play to 2005, and later relaunched the play in 2014 at the Arts Club.

RPS attracted corporate clients and found steady work performing customized comedy for conferences and also offering workshops for employee relations. As managing director of RPS, Frances was named one of the "Forty Under 40" by Business in Vancouver magazine in 2003. Frances also performed with the Impolite Company (IMPCO) sketch collective, Urban Improv and Canadian Content.

In July 1997, Frances starred in the one-act musical comedy I'd Probably Be Famous. She directed a production of The Complete Works of William Shakespeare (Abridged) in January 1998, and staged a portion of the play as a song-and-dance number when she found that her actors could tap dance. In 2001 and 2002, she performed with RPS in the improvised musical Blankety Blank: The Unknown Musical and Design For Living. In 2005, Frances began performing Leave it to Cleavage, an improv show she had developed with Ellie Harvie, in which their housewife characters provide 1950s-era solutions to modern problems posed by the audience. They were recognized with a 2004 Canadian Comedy Award nomination for Best Improv Troupe.

A demand for television programming came in the late 1990s with the launch of The Comedy Network, for which Frances wrote and starred in the sketch-comedy series Slightly Bent TV (1999) and Sucker Punch (2001–2002) and wrote for the 2002 satirical newsmagazine Point Blank. She wrote for CTV's Comedy Inc, and co-produced and performed in a comedy tour in support of its fifth season. She later wrote for This Hour Has 22 Minutes. Frances was nominated for a Gemini Award for writing for The Hour with George Stroumboulopoulos. Frances later wrote for Corner Gas Animated, which won her a 2020 Canadian Screen Award and a nomination for a 2020 Writers Guild of Canada Award. She has also written for The Beaverton, Aunty B's House and Still Standing.

Frances has developed material for Vancouver and Victoria fringe festivals, and is credited with bringing improvisational comedy to the Yukon after insisting on an improv segment at the 2003 Nakai comedy festival. Organizers and audiences were so impressed that Frances was booked for full improv shows the following years and closed the 2007 festival with Leave it to Cleavage.

In 2004, Frances wrote a CBC Radio documentary about women in comedy. She has written and appeared on several episodes of The Debaters and Definitely Not the Opera, contributed to the sketch comedy show The Irrelevant Show, and served as a relationship columnist with her feature Dating Diana. Frances continues to write for The Debaters, which was a finalist for the 2024 New York Festivals Radio Awards.

Frances performed with RPS on two tours for the Canadian Armed Forces: a one-month tour in 1997, visiting CFS Alert, Bosnia, Egypt, Israel, and CFB Goose Bay; and a nine-day tour of Afghanistan in 2003, performing at Camp Julien in Kabul and nearby Camp Warehouse.

In 2018, Frances began touring with Elvira Kurt and Friends and Girls Nite Out. In 2023, she performed six shows of Leave it to Cleavage at the Incanto Theatre in Puerto Vallarta, Mexico, with Second City alumni Karen Parker and Vancouver TheatreSports alumni Christine Lippa.

Frances has written for a number of award shows in Canada, including the 2018 ACTRA Awards in Toronto show, hosted by Colin Mochrie, and the 2019 and 2024 ACTRA Awards hosted by Martha Chaves. For 11 years, she has written the Banff World Media Festival Rockie Awards. She also wrote for the Just For Laughs Galas for 2017–2019. Frances has written for the Canadian Screen Awards in 2018 and 2019, the latter of which earned her a Canadian Screen Award nomination. and she has also written for The Directors Guild of Canada Awards (host Arisa Cox), and the Scotiabank Giller Prize.

Frances's first feature film script, The Burning Season, won Best Screenplay at the Whistler Film Festival and Canadian Film Festival and at the Writers Guild of Canada Awards.

== Selected works ==
=== Improv Productions ===
- A Twisted Christmas Carol with Rock Paper Scissors, seasonal 1991–2005, 2014
- The X-Mas Files with Vancouver Theatresports, December 1996
- Blankety Blank: The Unknown Musical with Rock Paper Scissors, April 2001, August 2002
- Sword Play, Improv Outlet Co-op, August 2004
- Leave it to Cleavage: The Original Desperate Housewives, with Ellie Harvie, January 2005. Reprises 2007, 2023
- Canadian Content, with Urban Improv, September 2005
- Girls Nite Out, 2018–current

=== Scripted plays ===
- I'd Probably Be Famous, July 1997
- The Complete Works of William Shakespeare (Abridged), January 1998, as director
- Design For Living with Rock Paper Scissors, April 2002
- Canadian Mounties vs. Atomic Invaders with Canadian Content, September 2006

=== Television ===
- Slightly Bent TV, 1999, writer/performer
- Sucker Punch, 2001–2002, writer/performer
- Sketch Troop, 2002, judge
- Point Blank, 2002, writer
- Comedy Inc, writer
- This Hour Has 22 Minutes, writer
- Corner Gas Animated, 2018–2019, writer
- 2018 Canadian Screen Awards, writer
- 2019 Canadian Screen Awards, writer
- Jonathan Van Ness: Kicks, 2020, writer
- Anthony Anderson: Awesomesauce, 2020 writer
- Overlord & The Underwoods, 2022, story editor
- Aunty B's House, 2023, writer

=== Radio ===
- The Debaters, writer/performer
- Definitely Not the Opera, writer/performer
- The Irrelevant Show
- Dating Diana, writer/host

=== Feature Film ===
- The Burning Season (2023)

== Awards ==
- Forty Under 40, Business in Vancouver, 2003.
- Gemini Award nominee for Best Writing in an Information Program or Series, The Hour with George Stroumboulopoulos, 2009
- Canadian Comedy Award nominee for Best Female Improviser, 2001, 2002, 2004, 2005, 2006, 2007, 2008, and 2015
- Canadian Comedy Award nominee for Best Improv Group, Leave It To Cleavage, 2004
- Writers Guild of Canada Screenwriting Awards, Sondra Kelly Award for Given Up, 2017
- Canadian Screen Awards nominee for Best Writing, Variety or Sketch Comedy, 2020
- Canadian Screen Award for Best Writing, Animation for Corner Gas Animated episode "Hedge Your Debts"
- Writers Guild of Canada Award, Best Screenplay, The Burning Season, 2024
