= Reem Morsi =

Egyptian-Canadian film director

Reem Morsi is an Egyptian-Canadian film director and screenwriter based in Toronto, Ontario. She is best known for her 2022 film The Last Mark.

She began her filmmaking career in the early 2010s with a number of short films, winning awards at the 2017 Yorkton Film Festival for her shorts The Door and Show and Tell. She concluded production in 2019 on her feature debut Hysteria, although its release was disrupted by the COVID-19 pandemic and the film has never seen wide distribution.

Her second feature film, The Last Mark, was screened for distributors in the Industry Selects program at the 2021 Toronto International Film Festival, before having its public premiere in 2022.

She followed up in 2023 with Queen Tut.
