= Michelle Giroux =

Canadian actress (born 1976)

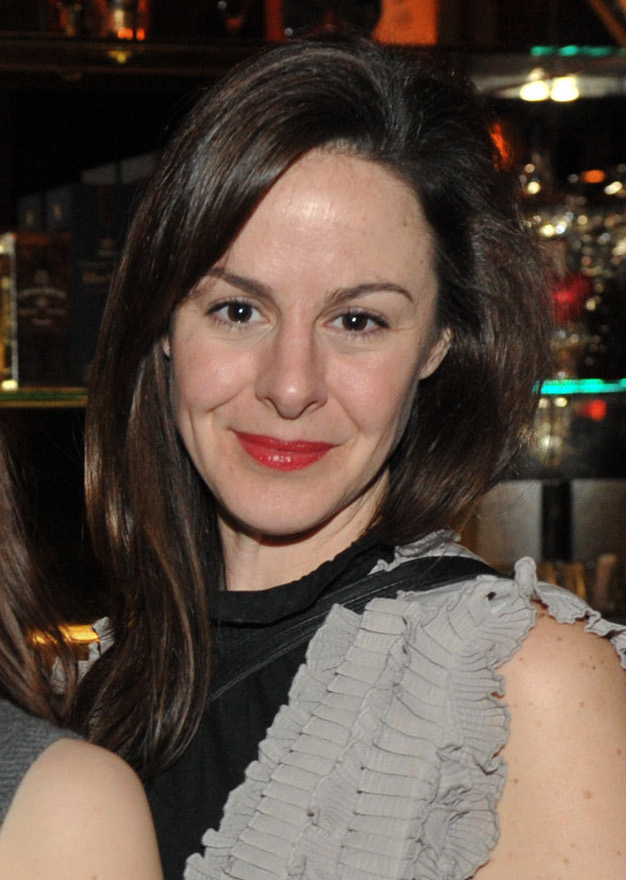
- Portrait of Michelle Giroux
- Born: 1976 (age 49–50); Toronto, Ontario, Canada
- Education: The Bishop Strachan School, The National Theatre School of Canada, The Birmingham Conservatory and The Canadian Film Centre
- Occupation: Actress
- Known for: Blood Pressure; BlackBerry
- Spouse: Graham Abbey (m. 2008)

Michelle Giroux (born 1976) is a Canadian actress whose credits include numerous productions at the Stratford Shakespeare Festival over fourteen seasons.

== Stage roles ==
Upon graduating from high school in Toronto, Giroux was accepted as an acting student at The National Theatre School of Canada. In her third year she was featured among other artists as one of the "ones to watch" in the Montreal Gazette selected by theatre critic Pat Donnelly. Shortly after graduating she joined the Stratford Festival acting Company in 1997. Later she would be called "one of the best young talents at Stratford," in Martin Hunter's book about the Festival.

In Romancing the Bard: Stratford at Fifty, Martin Hunter writes:

Michelle Giroux has shown a particular aptitude for willful, witty, and elegant young women in her portrayals of Lady Teazle in The School for Scandal, Gwendolyn in The Importance of Being Earnest, and Olivia in Twelfth Night.

Her featured roles include the 1998 production of The Miser opposite William Hutt which also played at the New York City Center, Lady Teazle in a 2001 production of The School for Scandal opposite Brian Bedford which went on to play at the Chicago Shakespeare Theater, a 2003 production of Noël Coward's Present Laughter, a 2005 production of The Brothers Karamazov, as well as Julia in a 2007 production of Edward Albee's A Delicate Balance. Other Stratford credits include Nina in The Seagull, Portia in The Merchant of Venice, Elvira in Blithe Spirit, Jean-Louise in To Kill a Mockingbird, Isabella in Edward II, Mary Robinson in The Swanne III, Helena in A Midsummer Night's Dream, Rosaline in Love's Labours Lost, Joan La Pucelle in Henry VI, Lydia in Pride and Prejudice and Althia McLaren in Front Page.

Her non-Stratford stage credits include starring in Claudia Dey's Trout Stanley at the Factory Theatre, Karoline Leach's Tryst and Same Time Next Year opposite R.H Thomson at the Segal Centre for Performing Arts in Montreal, an adaptation of The Misanthrope and The Oxford Room Climbers' Rebellion at the Tarragon Theatre and The Winter's Tale, Measure for Measure and Portia (Dora nomination) in Julius Caesar with Groundling Theatre Company.

== Screen roles ==
In 2009, Giroux studied in the inaugural acting class at the Canadian Film Center. Among her teachers were Norman Jewison, Sarah Polley, Kiefer Sutherland and Patricia Rozema. In 2013, Giroux starred in her first feature film, Blood Pressure, directed by Sean Garrity. She was nominated in 2014 for best actress by the Vancouver Film Critics for her performance.

=== Filmography ===
Film and television
Year	Title	Role	Notes
2010	She Said Lenny	Ellen	Short film
2010	Impossible	Narrator (voice)	Short film
2011	Murdoch Mysteries	Sarah Conolly Forbes	Episode: "Tattered and Torn"
2011	John A.: Birth of a Country	Isabella	TV film
2011	Flashpoint	Miranda Collins	Episode: "Day Game"
2012	The L.A. Complex	Samantha	Episode: "Down in L.A."
2012	King	Wendy Stetler	Episode: "Wendy Stetler"
2013	Blood Pressure	Nicole	Feature film
2017	Black Mirror	English Teacher	Episode: "Arkangel"
2020	Life in a Year	Amanda	Feature film
2022	The Hardy Boys	Dr. Vivian Burelli	Episodes: "A Clue on Film", "The Doctor's Orders", "A Midnight Scare" and "An Unexpected Return"
2022	Delia's Gone	Helena	Feature film
2023	BlackBerry	Dara Frankel	Feature film
2023	The Burning Season	Lillian	Feature film
2024	Hudson & Rex	Dasha Fedorov	Episode: "Dancer, Traitor, Shephered, Spy"
2024	Longing	Family Member 2	Feature film

== Awards and nominations ==
Year	Award	Category	Production	Result
2013	Vancouver Film Critics Circle Awards	Vancouver Film Critics Circle Award for Best Actress in a Canadian Film	Blood Pressure	Nominated

== Personal life ==
A resident of Toronto, she married Stratford colleague Graham Abbey in August 2008.
