= Whistler Film Festival ShortWork Awards =

The ShortWork Awards are annual film awards, presented by the Whistler Film Festival to honour the best short films screened at the festival.

Prior to 2012, a single award was presented inclusive of both Canadian and international short films; in that year, separate awards were created for Canadian and international films. In 2010, a category was also introduced for the best short film by British Columbia film students.

On two occasions in 2015 and 2016, an award was also presented for best screenplay in a Canadian short film, but this has not been presented since 2016.

== Best ShortWork ==
Year	Film	Filmmaker(s)	Ref
2002	Death's Dream	David Massar	
2003	The Watchers	Kevin Shortt	
2004	A Russian Wave	Becky Bristow	
2004	Man. Feel. Pain.	Dylan Akio Smith	
2005	Noise	Greg Spottiswood	
2006	Love Seat	Kris Elgstrand	
2007	The Colony	Jeff Barnaby	
2008	Next Floor	Denis Villeneuve	
2009	Life Begins (La Vie commence)	Émile Proulx-Cloutier	
2010	Via Gori	George Barbakadze	
2011	The Paris Quintet in Practice Makes Perfect	Benny Schuetze	

== Best Canadian ShortWork ==
Year	Film	Filmmaker(s)	Ref
2012	Requiem for Romance	Jonathan Ng	
2013	Anxious Oswald Greene	Marshall Axani	
2014	Running Season	Grayson Moore	
2015	Withheld	Jonathan Sousa	
2016	Mutants	Alexandre Dostie	
2017	We Forgot to Break Up	Chandler Levack	
2018	Brotherhood (Ikhwène)	Meryam Joobeur	
2019	My Favourite Food Is Indian Tacos, My Favourite Drink Is Iced Tea and My Favourite Thing Is Drumming	Derius Matchewan	
2020	Shooting Star (Comme une comète)	Ariane Louis-Seize	
2021	Angakusajaujuq: The Shaman's Apprentice	Zacharias Kunuk	
2021	Fufu	Omolola Ajao	
2022	Tongue	Kaho Yoshida	
2023	Atlantis	Zoé Pelchat, Jean-François Sauvé	
2023	Motherland	Jasmin Mozaffari	
2023	Soap	Lulu Wei	
2023	Zip	Ava Maria Safai	
2024	Hello Stranger	Amélie Hardy	
2025	Ramón Who Speaks to Ghosts	Shervin Kermani	

=== Best Screenplay ===
Year	Film	Filmmaker(s)	Ref
2015	The Wolf Who Came to Dinner	Jem Garrard	
2016	The Head Vanishes	Franck Dion	

== Best International ShortWork ==
Year	Film	Filmmaker(s)	Ref
2012	Drawn from Memory	Marcin Bortkiewicz	
2013	A Grand Canal	Johnny Ma	
2014	The Tide Keeper	Alyx Duncan	
2015	Dissonance	Till Nowak	
2016	Timecode	Juanjo Giménez	
2017	Fear Us Women	David Darg	
2018	Miss World	Georgia Fu	
2019	Daughter	Daria Kashcheeva	
2020	Ashmina	Dekel Berenson	
2021	Isole Ciclope	Ryan De Franco, Matthew Mendelson	
2022	Warsha	Dania Bdeir	
2022	Ice Merchants	João Gonzalez	
2023	I Promise You Paradise	Morad Mostafa	
2023	Fish Bowl	Rachel Sweeney	
2024	For Sale	Stephen George	
2025	Beyond Silence	Marnie Blok	

== Best British Columbia Student ShortWork ==
Year	Film	Filmmaker(s)	Ref
2010	Irradiate	Julia Hutchings	
2011	No Words Came Down	Ryan Flowers, Lisa Pham	
2012	Plating	Jon Thomas	
2013	Backward Fall	Andrew Pollins	
2014	Godhead	Connor Gaston	
2015	The Blue Jet	Lawrence Lam	
2016	Bombing	Gloria Mercer	
2017	Floating Light	Natalie Murao	
2018	The Bus Stop	Kama Sood	
2019	New Washing Machine	Mitch Huttema	
2020	Rollerbladies	Rowan Landaiche, Amber Nordstrand	
2021	A Family Act	Ashley Yeung	
2022	Omukama	Zane Klassen	
2023	Black & Blue	Emma Eng	
2023	Gerald	Kasha Rae Malinowski	
2023	Like the Wind	Hugh Saint-Jacques, Ethan Shandro	
2024	Body Varial	Audrey Kerridge	
2025	Pumpkin Head	Christopher Berry	
