= The Last Mark =

- Directed by: Reem Morsi
- Written by: Bruno Marino; Cheryl Meyer
- Produced by: Jordan Barker; Borga Dorter; Madison Falle; Bruno Marino
- Starring: Shawn Doyle; Alexia Fast; Jonas Chernick
- Cinematography: Luc Montpellier
- Edited by: Navin Ramaswaran
- Music by: Virginia Kilbertus
- Production companies: Gearshift Films; High Star Entertainment
- Distributed by: Epic Pictures
- Release date: March 1, 2022
- Running time: 85 minutes
- Country: Canada
- Language: English

The Last Mark is a Canadian thriller film, directed by Reem Morsi and released in 2022. The film stars Shawn Doyle as Keele, a hitman who is on his final assignment before retiring; after he and his partner Palmer's (Bryce Hodgson) successful killing of the target is witnessed by sex worker Peyton (Alexia Fast), Keele abducts her with the intention of helping her escape the country for her safety before Palmer can find and kill her.

The cast also includes Jonas Chernick as Eli, a fixer Keefe enlists for help in shepherding Peyton to safety, as well as Jasmin Geljo, Josh Cruddas, Diane Johnstone and Andre Richards in supporting roles.

The film was screened for distributors in the Industry Selects program of the 2021 Toronto International Film Festival, but was not made available to the general public. It premiered on video on demand platforms in the United States on March 1, 2022, although its release in Canada was delayed until April so that the film could screen as part of the Canadian Film Festival on April 1.

== Cast ==
- Shawn Doyle as James Keele
- Alexia Fast as Peyton Sallow
- Bryce Hodgson as Palmer
- Jonas Chernick as Eli
- Diane Johnstone as Mike's Mom
- Jasmin Geljo as Oslo
- Josh Cruddas as Doug
