= I Propose We Never See Each Other Again After Tonight =

2020 Canadian romantic comedy film

- Film poster
- Directed by: Sean Garrity
- Written by: Sean Garrity
- Produced by: Nick Christie; Sean Garrity
- Starring: Hera Nalam; Kristian Jordan
- Cinematography: Andrew Forbes
- Edited by: Sean Garrity
- Music by: Murray Pulver
- Production company: Bedbugs Films
- Distributed by: Mongrel Media
- Release date: August 21, 2020
- Running time: 102 minutes
- Country: Canada
- Language: English

I Propose We Never See Each Other Again After Tonight is a 2020 Canadian romantic comedy film directed by Sean Garrity. The film stars Kristian Jordan and Hera Nalam as Simon Friesen and Iris Dela Cruz, a man and woman in Winnipeg who meet when they both stop to help push a car out of the snow, and become a couple over the course of the film despite their initial lack of interest in each other.

Garrity chose to write the two central characters as a Mennonite and a Filipino Canadian, as both communities are prominent within Winnipeg but rarely represented in film.

The film had been slated to premiere in March 2020, but was disrupted by the COVID-19 pandemic in Canada. Its premiere was rescheduled to August; Garrity contrasted its adjusted release strategy against the concurrent Christopher Nolan film Tenet, noting that the social distancing strategies still in place at movie theatres would complicate the release of a Hollywood film but were not all that different from the much smaller audiences that turn out for Canadian independent films even in normal times.
