= Are You Scared to Be Yourself Because You Think That You Might Fail? =

2024 Canadian short film directed by Bec Pecaut

- Film poster
- Directed by: Bec Pecaut
- Written by: Bec Pecaut
- Produced by: Emily Harris
- Starring: Lío Mehiel; Sadie Scott; Phyllis Ellis
- Cinematography: Alice Stephens
- Edited by: Brendan Mills
- Music by: Gus Callahan
- Production company: OPC Production
- Release date: September 9, 2024 (TIFF)
- Running time: 17 minutes
- Country: Canada
- Language: English

Are You Scared to Be Yourself Because You Think That You Might Fail? is a 2024 Canadian short drama film, written and directed by Bec Pecaut. The film stars Lío Mehiel as Mad, a non-binary person wrestling with their turbulent emotions while recovering from gender-affirming surgery.

The cast also includes Sadie Scott, Phyllis Ellis and Francesca Dill.

The film had its world premiere in the Short Cuts program at the 2024 Toronto International Film Festival. It had its international premiere at the 2025 Sundance Film Festival.

The film was named to TIFF's annual Canada's Top Ten list for 2024.

== Awards ==
Year	Award	Category	Recipient	Status	Ref
2024	Toronto International Film Festival	Best Canadian Short Film	Bec Pecaut	Won	
2025	Clermont-Ferrand International Short Film Festival	Best Queer Short Award	Bec Pecaut	Won	
2025	Canadian Screen Awards	Best Live Action Short Drama	Emily Harris, Bec Pecaut	Nominated	
2025	Canadian Screen Awards	Best Performance in a Live Action Short Drama	Lío Mehiel	Nominated	
