= Ashgrove (film) =

- Directed by: Jeremy LaLonde
- Written by: Amanda Brugel; Jonas Chernick; Jeremy LaLonde; Spencer Giese
- Produced by: Jonas Chernick; Peter Harvey; Jeremy LaLonde
- Starring: Amanda Brugel; Jonas Chernick
- Cinematography: Robert Scarborough
- Edited by: Jeremy LaLonde
- Music by: Ian LeFeuvre
- Production companies: Banana-Moon Sky Films; Cryingman Productions; Peter Harvey Productions
- Distributed by: Northern Banner Releasing
- Release date: March 3, 2022 (GFF)
- Running time: 92 minutes
- Country: Canada
- Language: English

Ashgrove is a 2022 Canadian drama film, directed by Jeremy LaLonde. The film is set against the context of a pandemic that has infected the world's water supply, forcing people to strictly ration their water intake to balance the risk of dying of the disease against the risk of dying of dehydration; the film centres on Jennifer Ashgrove (Amanda Brugel), a scientist researching the cure for the fungus who is rapidly burning out from the stress, and is forced to take a weekend retreat with her husband Jason (Jonas Chernick) to work on the problems in their relationship that are also contributing to her stress.

The film's cast also includes Shawn Doyle and Natalie Brown as Elliott and Sammy, friends who join Jennifer and Jason on their trip, as well as Christine Horne and Sugith Varughese in supporting roles.

The film concept was conceived before the emergence of the COVID-19 pandemic, although it was shot in September 2020. It was written and produced through an improvisational process, whereby LaLonde and Spencer Giese wrote and edited only a broad story outline, informing most of the cast about the outline of each scene only as they were about to film it, and the actors had to improvise much of their dialogue based only on their character backgrounds.

The film premiered at the 2022 Glasgow Film Festival, and had its Canadian premiere at the 2022 Canadian Film Festival.

Concurrently with the film's production, Christopher Warre Smets also directed The Ashgrove Experiment, a documentary film about the process of making of the film.

== Cast ==
- Natalie Brown as Sammy
- Shawn Doyle as Elliot
- Sugith Varughese as Frank
- Christine Horne as Dr. Lakeland
- Amanda Brugel as Jennifer
- Jonas Chernick as Jason

== Critical response ==
Wendy Ide of Screen Daily gave the film a mixed review, calling its mix of relationship melodrama with a science fiction premise "a kind of dystopia-meets-soap-opera collision", and concluding that "the whole premise is increasingly far-fetched, requiring laborious explanation from a supporting character in order to coax the story to its conclusion".

At CFF, the film won the William F. White Reel Canadian Indie award, as well as the award for Best Ensemble Cast.
