= Lucid (2005 film) =

- Directed by: Sean Garrity
- Written by: Sean Garrity; Jonas Chernick
- Produced by: Jamie Brown; Jonas Chernick; Lisa Cichelly; Sean Garrity
- Starring: Jonas Chernick; Lindy Booth; Callum Keith Rennie; Kristen Harris; Michelle Nolden
- Cinematography: Michael Marshall
- Edited by: John Gurdebeke
- Music by: Richard Moody
- Distributed by: Mongrel Media
- Release date: 11 September 2005
- Running time: 113 minutes
- Country: Canada
- Language: English

Lucid is a 2005 Canadian film written and directed by Sean Garrity. The film centers on Joel Rothman (Jonas Chernick), a man who is suffering from insomnia after having massive problems in his personal life including a separation and being targeted by his boss. As a psychotherapist he is assigned three patients suffering from posttraumatic stress disorder. He must treat them to figure out his own life.

It won the award for Best Western Canadian Film at the Vancouver International Film Festival in 2005.
