= The Burning Season (2023 film) =

2023 Canadian drama film

- Directed by: Sean Garrity
- Written by: Jonas Chernick; Diana Frances
- Produced by: Andrew Bronfman; Jonas Chernick
- Starring: Sara Canning; Jonas Chernick; Joe Pingue; Tanisha Thammavongsa
- Cinematography: Eric Oh
- Edited by: John Gurdebeke
- Music by: Kevon Cronin
- Production companies: Banana-Moon Sky Films; Good Movies; The Time We Met Productions
- Distributed by: Northern Banner Releasing
- Release date: November 30, 2023 (Whistler Film Festival)
- Running time: 89 minutes
- Country: Canada
- Language: English

The Burning Season is a 2023 Canadian drama film, directed by Sean Garrity. The film stars Sara Canning, Jonas Chernick, Joe Pingue and Tanisha Thammavongsa. The screenplay, written by Chernick and Diana Frances, won the award for best Canadian screenplay at the 2023 Whistler Film Festival, where it had its world premiere.

== Plot ==
JB is the owner of a lake resort whose wedding to Poppy is disrupted by the revelation that he has been having a seven-year affair with Alena, a woman who has been coming to the resort for seven years for summer vacations with her husband Tom, and then depicts the affair in reverse chronological order. The film ends with a jump back to the one previous time Alena visited the resort, as a teenager with her parents. That is when she and Benny (the teenaged JB) originally meet. The teen couple are caught by her father in the act of losing their virginity to each other – after which the petulant Alena murders her drunken passed out father by burning down the family cabin.

== Cast ==
- Sara Canning as Alena
- Jonas Chernick as JB
- Joe Pingue as Tom
- Tanisha Thammavongsa as Poppy
- Natalie Jane as Young Alena
- Christian Meer as Benny

== Production ==
The film went into production in fall 2022 in Algonquin Park, under the working title Mockingbird. It premiered on November 30, 2023, in the Borsos Competition program at the Whistler Film Festival.

== Awards ==
At Whistler, Chernick and Diana Frances won the award for Best Screenplay in a Borsos Competition film.
