= Jonas Chernick =

Canadian actor and screenwriter

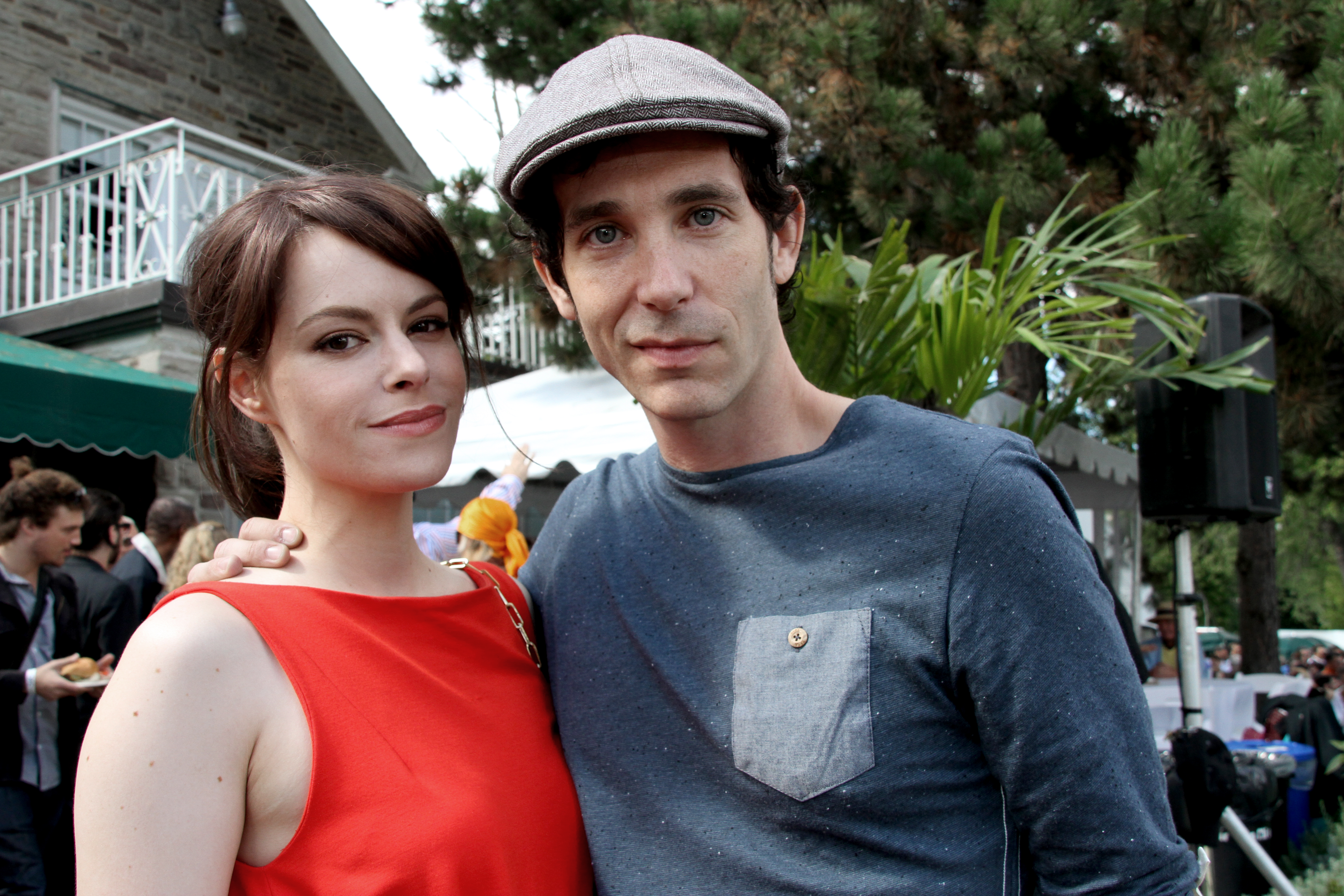
- Jonas Chernick with actress Emily Hampshire in 2012
- Born: July 16, 1973 (age 53); Winnipeg, Manitoba, Canada
- Occupations: Actor, screenwriter
- Years active: 1990s–present

Jonas Chernick (born July 16, 1973) is a Canadian actor and screenwriter.

== Career ==
Chernick's credits as an actor include the films Inertia, Lucid, Paid in Full, Seven Times Lucky, Mayday, Blood Pressure, My Awkward Sexual Adventure, How to Plan an Orgy in a Small Town, Borealis, The Go-Getters, James vs. His Future Self, Cinema of Sleep, The Last Mark and Ashgrove, and the television series The Border, At the Hotel, Living in Your Car, Degrassi, The Eleventh Hour and The Best Laid Plans. He was credited as a writer on Lucid, My Awkward Sexual Adventure, Borealis and James vs. His Future Self.

He won the Gemini Award for Best Supporting Actor in a Drama Program or Series at the 23rd Gemini Awards in 2008, for his role as Agent Slade in The Border.

== Personal life ==
Originally from Winnipeg, Manitoba, Chernick was born and raised in a Jewish family. He is based in Toronto, Ontario.

== Filmography ==
=== Film ===
Year	Title	Role	Notes
1992	Careful	Butler Student	
2000	Nostradamus	Apprentice Mercurin	
2001	Inertia	Joseph	
2002	Edge of Madness	William Sellor	
2002	Paid in Full	Detective / Surgeon	
2004	Seven Times Lucky	Sonny	
2005	Lucid	Joel Rothman	
2012	The Samaritan	Club Manager	
2012	My Awkward Sexual Adventure	Jordan Abrams	
2012	Blood Pressure	Darryl Saunders	
2015	Borealis	Jonah	
2015	How to Plan an Orgy in a Small Town	Chester O'Connell	
2017	A Swingers Weekend	Geoffrey	
2018	The Go-Getters	The Pawn Shop Owner	
2019	James vs. His Future Self	James	
2019	The Prague Orgy	Nathan / writer	
2021	Cinema of Sleep	Frank	
2022	The Last Mark	Eli	
2022	Ashgrove	Jason	
2022	The End of Sex	Josh	
2023	The Burning Season	JB	also writer, producer
2024	A Thousand Cuts	Frasier	
2026	Surfacing	David	

=== Television ===
Year	Title	Role	Notes
1998, 2000	The Adventures of Shirley Holmes	Mikola / Daniel Devine	2 episodes
1999	Roswell: The Aliens Attack	Frozen Soldier	Television film
1999	Life in a Day	Victor	Television film
2001	Queer as Folk	Pickup Guy	Episode: "Move It or Lose It"
2001	A Woman's a Helluva Thing	Matt Fox	Television film
2002	Earth: Final Conflict	McKnight	Episode: "Final Conflict"
2002	Last Call	Warren Nagler	Television film
2002	The Glow	Randy	Television film
2002	Mutant X	Josh	Episode: "The Future Revealed"
2002	Chasing Cain II: Face	Terence	Television film
2002–2004	The Eleventh Hour	Gavin Kowalchuk	14 episodes
2003	The Crooked E	Bernie Bickers	Television film
2003	The Pentagon Papers	Neil Sheehan	Television film
2003	The Wonderful World of Disney	Phillip	Episode: "Eloise at the Plaza"
2003	Defending Our Kids: The Julie Posey Story	Keith	Television film
2003	Cowboys and Indians: The J.J. Harper Story	Constable Bill Issac	Television film
2003	Doc	Walter	Episode: "Men in Tights"
2005	Mayday	Mickey King	Television film
2005	Recipe for a Perfect Christmas	Peter	Television film
2006	This Is Wonderland	Raymond Millman	Episode #3.8
2006	At the Hotel	Danny Book	3 episodes
2006	Intimate Stranger	Alex	Television film
2007	Little Mosque on the Prairie	Johnny	2 episodes
2007	Love You to Death	Paul	Episode: "The Bog Murder"
2008–2010	The Border	Heironymous Slade	38 episodes
2009	Being Erica	Ivan 'IF' Frankel	Episode: "Erica the Vampire Slayer"
2010	Haven	Ezra	Episode: "The Trial of Audrey Parker"
2010–2011	Degrassi: The Next Generation	Mr. Betenkamp	11 episodes
2011	The Listener	Gregory Wassermann	Episode: "Eye of the Storm"
2011	King	Trevor Winter	Episode: "Scout Winter"
2011	Living in Your Car	Marty	5 episodes
2012	Covert Affairs	Isaac Reiss	Episode: "This Is Not America"
2013	The Casting Room	Jonas Chernick	Episode: "Jonas Chernick"
2013	Saving Hope	Nick	Episode: "I Watch Death"
2013	Time of Death	Perry Collins	Television film
2013	Played	Goose	Episode: "Money"
2014	The Best Laid Plans	Daniel Addison	6 episodes
2015	Fargo	Syd Schwartz	Episode: "Waiting for Dutch"
2016	Dark Matter	Eric Waver	Episode: "Going Out Fighting"
2018	Private Eyes	Chris Henley	Episode: "A Fare to Remember"
2020	Workin' Moms	Craig Strathern	6 episodes
2020	Transplant	Reese	Episode: "The Only Way Out is Through"
