= After the Ball (2015 film) =

- Directed by: Sean Garrity
- Written by: Kate Melville; Jason Sherman
- Produced by: Don Carmody; Robin Crumley; Gabriella Martinelli; Jane Silverstone-Segal
- Starring: Portia Doubleday; Marc-André Grondin; Lauren Holly; Carlo Rota; Mimi Kuzyk; Colin Mochrie; Chris Noth
- Cinematography: Pierre Gill
- Edited by: Erin Deck
- Music by: Ari Posner
- Production companies: Myriad Pictures; Pacific Northwest Pictures; Martinelli Films; Don Carmody Productions; Jane Silverstone-Segal Productions; Telefilm Canada
- Distributed by: Freestyle Releasing; Myriad Pictures
- Release date: 27 February 2015
- Running time: 101 minutes
- Country: Canada
- Language: English
- Box office: $161,820

After the Ball is a 2015 Canadian romantic comedy-drama film directed by Sean Garrity. The film had a limited release in Canada on 27 February 2015, followed by a VOD release on 24 April 2015. The film stars Portia Doubleday as Kate, a young woman that is forced to dress up as a man due to a series of misadventures. The film is loosely based on the Cinderella fairy tale.

== Plot ==
Kate "Katie" Kassell is the daughter of Lee Kassell, the founder and CEO of Kassell Fashion. She is a fashion major and when she graduates, her estranged father asks her to come work for him. She reluctantly accepts when no one else will hire her. However, Kate's stepmother, Elise, and her two stepsisters, Simone and Tannis, conspire to keep her from rising in the company and ruining their plans. Instead of letting her design, they put her to work cleaning and sorting a large storage room filled with years of untouched buttons.

Working next door to the button room is shoe designer, Daniel. They talk and instantly take a liking to each other. He encourages Kate to keep working hard, and she will eventually make it. Inspired, she draws a design to improve on Kassell's boring attire, but Simone and Tannis steal the design and take credit for it, impressing Lee.

Elise and her daughters eventually succeed in running Kate out of the company by framing her for leaking designs to Kassell's sniveling rival, Frost. With the help of her godparents, Bella and Richard, she disguises herself as a man named Nate and re-enters the company, this time as a designer. "Nate" quickly impresses Lee with more vintage designs, similar to those of Kate's late mother, which Kassell had built its foundation on. He quickly becomes Lee's star apprentice and buddies with Daniel and design assistant, Maurice.

Faced with the dilemma of Nate being invited to the fashion ball by Lee to present the fall line-up and Kate being invited by Daniel, she decides to go as both. While changing disguises in a storage room, she overhears Elise and Frost conspiring to steal the designs and framing it on Nate. Nate runs up to tell Lee, but Elise has already convinced Lee that it was his doing, and he is fired. Upset, she runs out of the ball and leaves, but not before Daniel realizes Nate is really Kate.

Feeling his company is ruined, Lee prepares to sell Kassell to Frost, but Daniel and Maurice come to Kate with a plan. Simone and Tannis follow them and discover her secret, but she tricks them into modeling the fall line-up at the press conference. Nate shows up at the conference just before Lee announces the deal, and with the help of Daniel and Maurice shows him that it was really Elise and her daughters that were stealing designs and conspiring with Frost to overthrow the company. They reveal the file of the fall line-up that they had stolen was a fake, as proven when Simone and Tannis walk in modeling ridiculous clothing. Kate reveals herself to her father, who makes up with her and fires Elise and her daughters.

Six months later, Kate is dating Daniel and is now a head designer at Kassell, which has become a thriving business again. Elise, Simone and Tannis are forced to work for Frost, who puts them to work sorting years worth of untouched buttons.

== Cast ==
- Portia Doubleday as Kate "Katie" Kassell/Nate Ganymede
- Marc-André Grondin as Daniel
- Chris Noth as Lee Kassell
- Lauren Holly as Elise Adams Kassell
- Anna Hopkins as Simone Adams
- Natalie Krill as Tannis Adams
- Mimi Kuzyk as Bella Shapiro
- Carlo Rota as Richard
- David Michaël as Maurice
- Colin Mochrie as Frost
- Lola Tash as Polly

== Reception ==
Critical reception for After the Ball has been mixed. The film holds a rating of 27% on Rotten Tomatoes, based on 15 reviews, with an average score of 4.98/10. The Hollywood Reporter and Variety both criticized the film as being unmemorable, while the National Post commented that by the film's climax "you've either given up on the film or been won over by its moderate charms, but in either case you know you're almost at happily-ever-after, and an end credits rolls that includes funding by Telefilm Canada. If you're familiar with Cinderella or Shakespeare (film versions count), this will be comfort food with no nasty surprises."

Costume designer Mario Davignon collaborated with clothing retailer Le Château to produce a clothing line based on his designs for the film.

== Accolades ==
On 30 January 2020, Marc-André Grondin retroactively received for the year 2012 the Aurore Award for the Masculine Liquid-Paper Award (Worst actor). This has been done so after the actor said during an interview with La Presse that he was saddened not to receive the prize after his performance.
