= Emily Hampshire =

Canadian actress

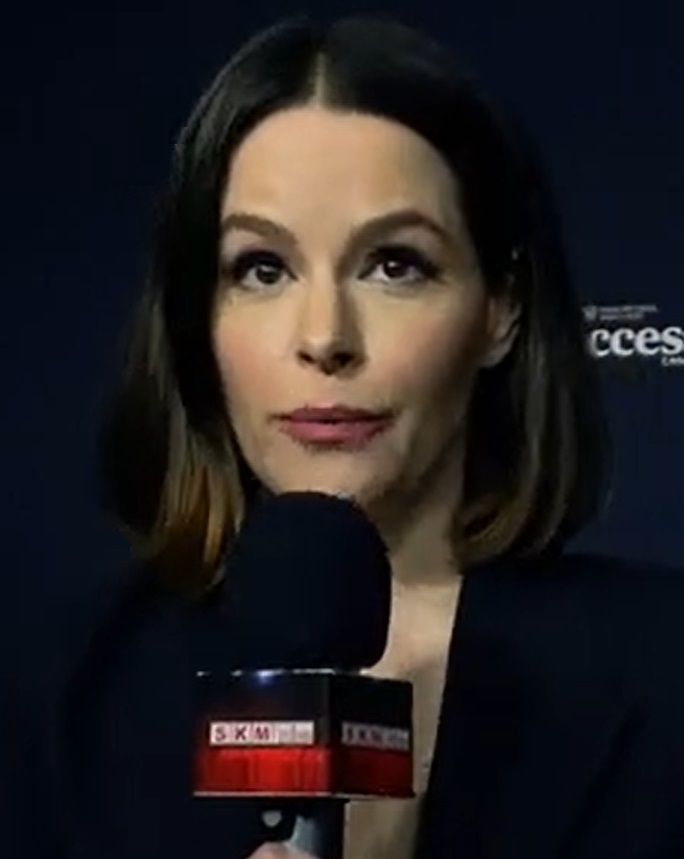
- Hampshire in 2024
- Born: 1979–1981 (age 45–47) (Note: Her birth year is disputed. Many sources claim her birth year to be 1981. However in an October 2009 interview with the Toronto Star she talks about how she recently turned 30 and that she's three years older than Jay Baruchel who was born in 1982, which implies a 1979 birth year. Articles published by The Globe And Mail in September 2012 and the National Post in December 1999 list ages that also imply a 1979 birth year as well.); Montreal, Quebec, Canada
- Occupation: Actress
- Years active: 1994–present
- Spouse: Matthew Smith (m. 2006; div. 2014)

Emily Hampshire is a Canadian actress. Her best known roles include Angelina in Boy Meets Girl, Vivienne in Snow Cake, Jennifer Goines in 12 Monkeys, and Stevie Budd in Schitt's Creek, as well as the voice of Alyson Malitski in Braceface, Diana Barry in Anne of Green Gables: The Animated Series, Chloe Crashman in Carl Squared, and Misery in Ruby Gloom. Hampshire has held leading roles in the series Chapelwaite (2021) and The Rig (2023–present).

== Early life ==
Hampshire was born in Montreal to Robert Hampshire, a dentist. She became interested in acting at age 11 after attending a performance of Les Misérables with her mother. Her interests were solidified by the vice principal of her all-girls Catholic school, who praised her performance during a school theatre production. At age 16, she moved to Toronto to pursue roles in TV and film. She was accepted into the American Academy of Dramatic Arts shortly after high school but never attended, as it conflicted with a film opportunity.

== Career ==
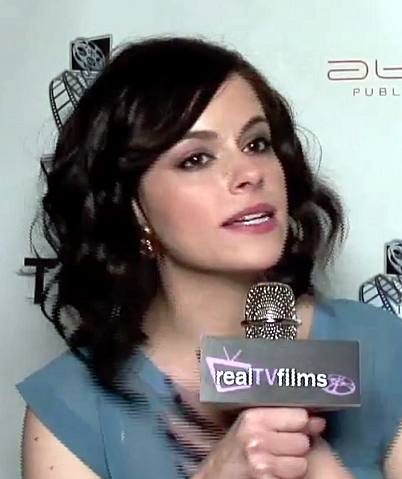
Emily Hampshire at TIFF in 2010

Hampshire has been professionally active in the Canadian film and television industry since 1996. She has starred in the Canadian series This Space For Rent, Carl², and Northern Town. She played Margaret in The Life Before This, a feature film directed by Jerry Ciccoritti, which premiered at the Toronto International Film Festival (TIFF) in 1999.

Hampshire starred alongside Kevin Zegers and Samaire Armstrong in the 2006 romantic comedy It's a Boy/Girl Thing, in which she played the character Chanel. In 2009, she appeared in The Trotsky as Leon Trotsky's love interest Alexandra. In 2010, she starred in the Canadian indie film, Good Neighbours. Hampshire has also done voice-acting, voicing the character Misery on the animated series Ruby Gloom, Diana Barry in Anne of Green Gables: The Animated Series, Chloe Crashman in Carl², Starr in 6teen, and Alyson Malitski in Braceface.

On May 23, 2012, in Cannes, France, Hampshire and fellow actress Sarah Gadon were presented with the first Birks Canadian Diamond award during Telefilm Canada's inaugural Tribute to Canadian Talent press event and reception. Also in 2012, Hampshire starred in David Cronenberg's Cosmopolis as Jane Melman, and co-starred in Sean Garrity's comedy film My Awkward Sexual Adventure, for which she received positive critical notice. The same year she was cast in the futuristic-zombie film The Returned.

In 2014, Hampshire was cast in the Syfy series 12 Monkeys in the recurring role of Jennifer Goines, a reimagined version of Brad Pitt's character from the film on which the series is based; in 2015, she was upped to a series regular for the show's second season. From 2015 to 2020, she played Stevie Budd in the CBC television series Schitt's Creek.

In late 2015, Hampshire was cast in Xavier Dolan's independent film The Death and Life of John F. Donovan, which also stars Natalie Portman, Kathy Bates, and Susan Sarandon.

In 2021, she appeared in the music video for The Tragically Hip's single "Not Necessary", from their EP Saskadelphia. In 2022, she played a main role as Rose Mason, starring alongside Iain Glen, Owen Teale, and Mark Addy in the Amazon Prime television series The Rig.

In 2023, she co-wrote the graphic novel Amelia Aierwood –- Basic Witch, was published by Z2 Comics. In 2026, she was nominated for Best Voice Performance at the 14th Canadian Screen Awards, for her voiced portrayal of 'Captain Fuzzyweather' in Hulu's The Bravest Knight.

In 2026, Hampshire appeared in Marvel Studios' web television series VisionQuest (2026), created by showrunner Terry Matalas, whom she previously worked with on 12 Monkeys, portraying the character of Edith Marks / E.D.I.T.H. alongside Paul Bettany's Vision.

== Personal life ==
Hampshire is pansexual. In 2006, she married Matthew Smith, a former football player turned agent-in-training at the William Morris Agency. They divorced shortly before she was cast in Schitt's Creek in 2014. In September 2018, it was confirmed that Hampshire was in a relationship with singer-songwriter Teddy Geiger; they became engaged in November 2018. They ended their engagement on June 10, 2019.

In 2007, Hampshire moved to Los Angeles. Hampshire became a naturalized U.S. citizen in September 2014; currently, she divides her time between Los Angeles and Toronto.

== Filmography ==
=== Film ===
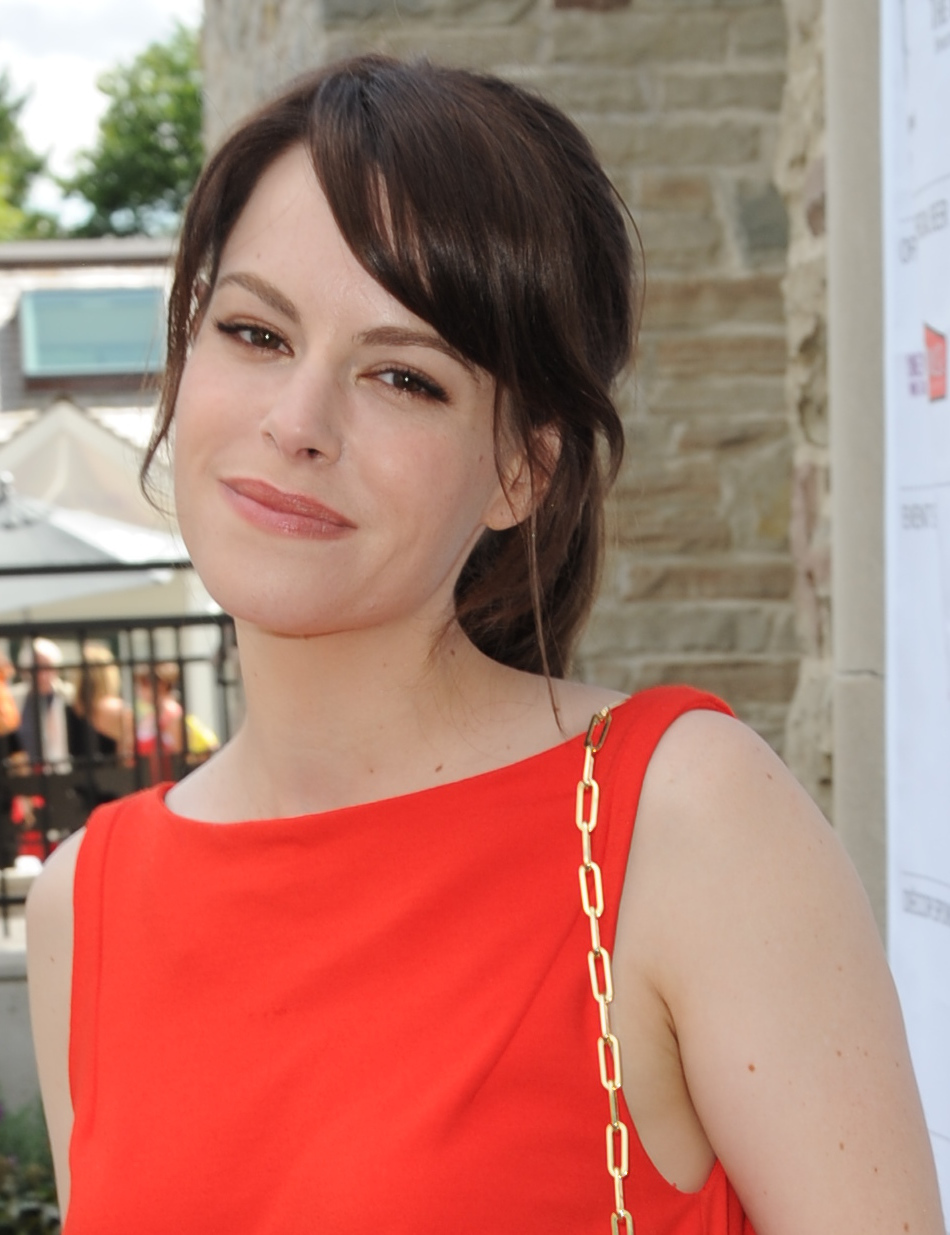
Emily Hampshire at CFC Annual BBQ 2012

Year	Title	Role	Notes
1997	Dead Innocent	Nicole	
1998	Boy Meets Girl	Angelina Milleflores	
1999	The Life Before This	Margaret	
2001	Chasing Cain	Holly	
2002	Posers	Ruth	
2003	A Problem with Fear	Dot	
2003	Twist	Waitress	
2004	Blood	Noelle Terry	
2006	Snow Cake	Vivienne Freeman	
2006	It's a Boy Girl Thing	Chanel	
2007	The Cradle	Julie	
2009	The Trotsky	Alexandra Leith	
2010	Die	Lisa Meridian	
2010	Good Neighbours	Louise	
2012	Cosmopolis	Jane Melman	
2012	My Awkward Sexual Adventure	Julia Bowe	
2013	All the Wrong Reasons	Nicole	
2013	The Returned	Kate	
2013	That Burning Feeling	Genevieve	
2015	Borealis	Kyla	
2017	Mother!	Fool	
2017	Never Saw It Coming	Keisha Ceylon	
2018	The Death and Life of John F. Donovan	Amy Bosworth	
2022	The End of Sex	Emma	Also executive producer
2023	Self Reliance	Mary	
2023	Fitting In	Rita	
2023	Appendage	Claudia	
2023	The Mattachine Family	Leah	
2024	Humane	Rachel York	
2026	Mike & Nick & Nick & Alice	Sam	
2026	All Night Wrong	Laura	

=== Television ===
Year	Title	Role	Notes
1994, 1996	Are You Afraid of the Dark?	Sandy Campbell, Heather	Episodes: "The Tale of Cutter's Treasure: Part 1", "The Tale of the Vacant Lot"
1997	The Last Don	Young Rose Marie	Television miniseries
1997	Every 9 Seconds	Missy	Television film
1997	Earth: Final Conflict	Julie Payton	Episode: "Miracle"
1998–2001	Made in Canada	Siobhan Roy	Recurring role (seasons 1–3), 15 episodes
1999	Seasons of Love	Adult Charlotte	Television film
1999	Love Letters	Gretchen Lascelles	Television film
1999	Happy Face Murders	Tracy Billings	Television film
1999	Mythic Warriors	2nd Village Girl	Voice role; episode: "Phaeton: The Chariot of Fire"
2000	Psi Factor: Chronicles of the Paranormal	Abby Butler	Episode: "Tyler/Tim"
2000	Twice in a Lifetime	Young Blair Wilson	Episode: "Party Girls"
2000	La Femme Nikita	Satin Tate	Episode: "Sleeping with the Enemy"
2000	The Ride	Adeline Kelly	Television film
2000	Scorn	Amanda	Television film
2001	Doc	N/A	Episode: "You Gotta Have Heart"
2001	The Associates	Sarah Arrigo	Episode: "Care & Control"
2001	MythQuest	Contessa	Episode: "The Doppelganger"
2001–2004	Braceface	Alyson	Main voice role
2001–2002	Anne of Green Gables: The Animated Series	Diana Barry	Main voice role
2002	Chasing Cain: Face	Holly	Television film
2002	Mutant X	Charlotte Cooke	Episode "Altered Ego"
2002	A Nero Wolfe Mystery	Carol Annis	Episode: "Poison à la Carte"
2002	The Eleventh Hour	Amy Kimball / Meredith	Episode: "Tree Hugger"
2003	Foolish Girl	Goth Girl	TV series
2003	The Atwood Stories	Christine Anderson	Episode: "The Man from Mars"
2003	Miss Spider's Sunny Patch Kids	Katie	Voice role; Television film
2004	This Is Wonderland	Marsha Flutie	Episode 1.5
2004	Puppets Who Kill	Sister Selma	Episode: "Prostitutes for Jesus"
2004	Atomic Betty	Megan	Voice role; episode: "The Doppelganger/Cosmic Cake"
2004	Earthsea	Rosa	Television miniseries
2004	6teen	Starr	Voice role; episodes
2004–2005	Miss Spider's Sunny Patch Friends	Katie Katydid	Voice role; 3 episodes
2005–2006	Carl²	Chloe Crashman	Recurring voice role; 14 episodes
2006	Northern Town	Amanda	TV series
2006–2008	Ruby Gloom	Misery	Main voice role
2007	This Space for Rent	Iona Goldenthal	Episode: "Stain'd"
2011	Republic of Doyle	Tricia	Episode: "Something Old, Something New"
2012	Hitched for the Holidays	Julie	Television film (Hallmark)
2013	Rookie Blue	Celery	Recurring role, 4 episodes
2015	Man Seeking Woman	Krystal	Episode: "Pitbull"
2015–2018	12 Monkeys	Jennifer Goines	Recurring role (season 1); main role (seasons 2–4)
2015–2020	Schitt's Creek	Stevie Budd	Main role
2016	Houdini & Doyle	Madame Korzha	Episode: "The Curse of Korzha"
2019	Save Me	Sasha	Web series; episodes: "Bar is Low", "Boyfriend Material"
2020	50 States of Fright	Megan Bloom	2 episodes
2021	Robot Chicken	Daughter	Voice role; episode: "May Cause Lucid Murder Dreams"
2021	Chapelwaite	Rebecca Morgan	Main role
2022	Trixie Motel	Herself	Episode: "Pride Grand Opening"
2023–2025	The Rig	Rose Mason	Main role
2023	Slip	Sandy	3 episodes
2023	The Real Housewives of New York City	Herself	Episode: "Anniversorry, Not Sorry"
2023	Celebrity Jeopardy!	Herself	Contestant
2025	The Bravest Knight	Captain Fuzzyweather	Voice - CSA Nom
2026	Slo Pitch	Leanne	5 episodes
2026	VisionQuest	E.D.I.T.H.	Main role
2027	Heated Rivalry †	Vanessa	Season 2

=== Video games ===
- Command & Conquer 4: Tiberian Twilight (2010), as Lillian Parker

== Awards and nominations ==
Year	Award	Category	Work	Result	Refs
2001	Genie Awards	Best Ensemble Performance in a Comedy Program or Series	Made in Canada	Won	
2003	Genie Awards	Performance by an Actress in a Supporting Role	A Problem with Fear	Nominated	
2004	Genie Awards	Performance by an Actress in a Leading Role	Blood	Nominated	
2006	Genie Awards	Performance by an Actress in a Supporting Role	Snow Cake	Nominated	
2008	Genie Awards	Best Individual or Ensemble Performance in an Animated Program or Series	Ruby Gloom	Nominated	
2012	Canadian Diamond Awards	Tribute to Canadian Talent	Various	Won	
2013	Canadian Comedy Awards	Best Female Performance in a Feature	My Awkward Sexual Adventure	Won	
2015	Golden Maple Awards	Newcomer of the year in a TV series broadcast in the U.S.	12 Monkeys; Schitt's Creek	Won	
2016	4th Canadian Screen Awards	Best Performance by an Actress in a Featured Supporting Role or Guest Role in a Comedic Series	Schitt's Creek	Won	
2016	Golden Maple Awards	Best actress in a TV series broadcast in the U.S.	12 Monkeys; Schitt's Creek	Nominated	
2017	5th Canadian Screen Awards	Best Performance by an Actress in a Featured Supporting Role or Guest Role in a Comedic Series	Schitt's Creek	Won	
2018	6th Canadian Screen Awards	Best Performance by an Actress in a Featured Supporting Role or Guest Role in a Comedic Series	Schitt's Creek	Won	
2019	7th Canadian Screen Awards	Best Performance by an Actress in a Featured Supporting Role or Guest Role in a Comedic Series	Schitt's Creek	Won	
2019	Screen Actors Guild Awards	Outstanding Performance by an Ensemble in a Comedy Series	Schitt's Creek	Nominated	
2020	8th Canadian Screen Awards	Best Performance by an Actress in a Featured Supporting Role or Guest Role in a Comedic Series	Schitt's Creek	Won	
2020	Screen Actors Guild Awards	Outstanding Performance by an Ensemble in a Comedy Series	Schitt's Creek	Won	
2021	9th Canadian Screen Awards	Best Performance by an Actress in a Featured Supporting Role or Guest Role in a Comedic Series	Schitt's Creek	Won	
2026	14th Canadian Screen Awards	Best Voice Performance	The Bravest Knight	Nominated	
