= Aidan Shipley =

Canadian actor and filmmaker

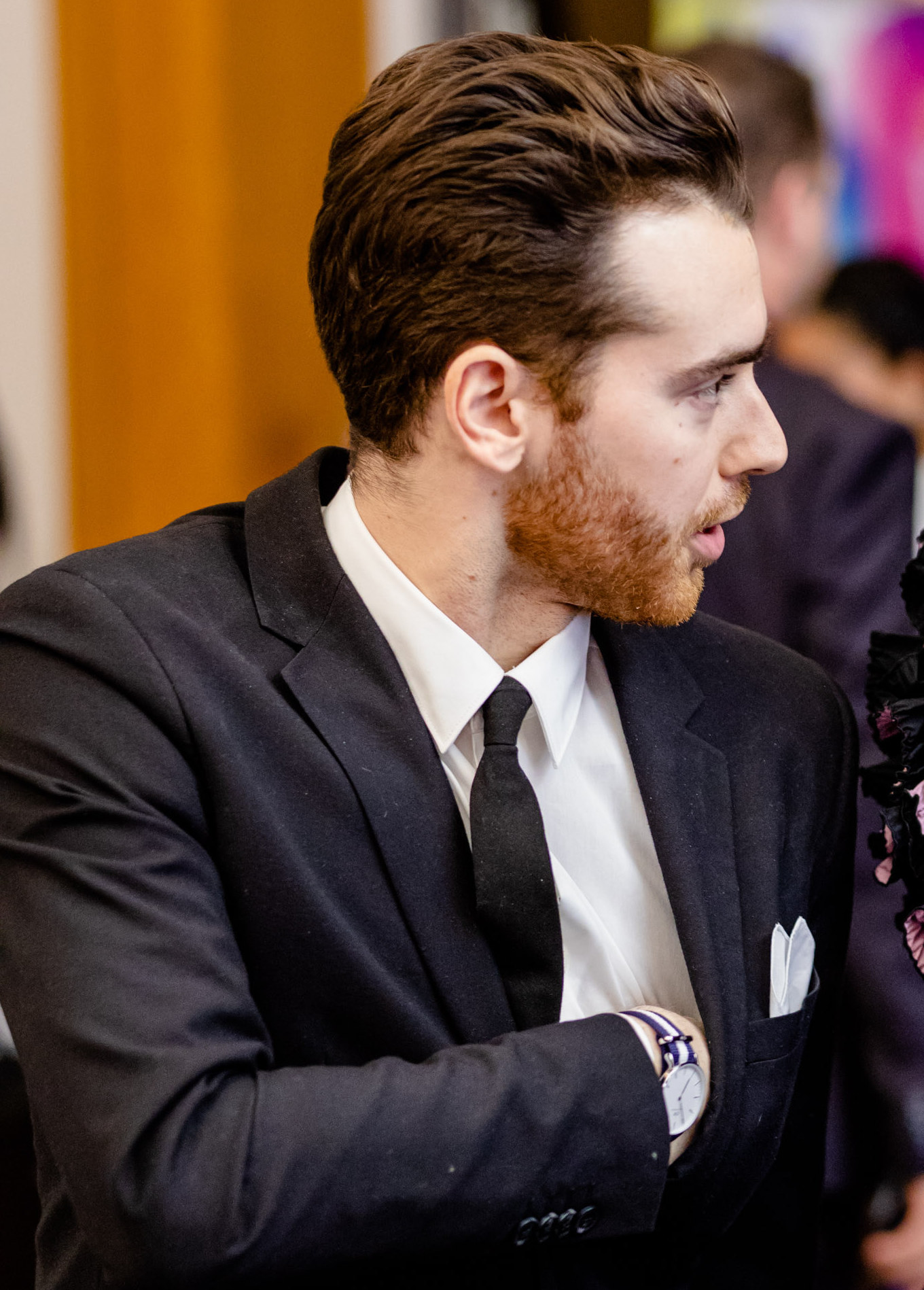
- Shipley at the 2020 CFC Annual Gala & Auction
- Born: December 11, 1992 (age 33); Ontario, Canada
- Occupations: Actor; filmmaker
- Years active: 2009–present
- Partner: Amanda Brugel

Aidan Shipley (born December 11, 1992) is a Canadian actor and filmmaker, most noted as co-director with Grayson Moore of the 2017 film Cardinals.

== Career ==
A native of Stratford, Ontario, he began his acting career in supporting stage roles at the Stratford Festival, before studying acting and filmmaking at Ryerson University (now Toronto Metropolitan University). His acting roles have included appearances in the television series Overruled!, Pure Pwnage, Baxter, What's Up Warthogs!, Flashpoint and Murdoch Mysteries, and the films Vacation with Derek, Red Lights, Bunks, Running Season, The Captive and Natasha.

Shipley, Moore, Connor Illsley, and Jon Riera won the Canadian Screen Award for Best Direction in a Web Program or Series at the 7th Canadian Screen Awards in 2019, for the short film Deerbrook.

== Filmography ==
=== Film ===
| Year | Title | Role | Notes |
|---|---|---|---|
| 2012 | Red Lights | Tom's Soldier Son | |
| 2014 | Running Season | Connor O'Connor | Short film |
| 2014 | The Captive | Albert | |
| 2015 | Natasha | Rufus | |
| 2017 | Separation | Jack | Short film |
| 2017 | Clusterf*ck | Kevin | |
| 2018 | Edging | Crossland | |
| 2018 | Acquainted | Jesse | Also as third assistant director |

=== Television ===
| Year | Title | Role | Notes |
|---|---|---|---|
| 2009 | Overruled! | Vincet | Episode: "Worlds Collide" |
| 2010 | Pure Pwnage | Teenager | Guest star (2 episodes) |
| 2010 | Vacation with Derek | Ben | Family Channel Original Movie |
| 2010 | Baxter | Breakdancer | Episode: "Dancing Fools" |
| 2010 | What's Up Warthogs! | Money Melvin | Guest star (2 episodes) |
| 2012 | Frenemies | Walker's Pal #2 | Disney Channel Original Movie |
| 2012 | Flashpoint | Tobias | Episode: Broken Peace |
| 2013 | Bunks | Dean O'Reilly | Disney XD Original Movie |
| 2015 | A Wish Come True | Joey | Hallmark Channel Original Movie |
| 2017 | Murdoch Mysteries | Mr. Denton | Episode: "Brackenreid Boudoir" |

== Filmmaker work ==
Films

| Year | Title | Credited as | | Notes |
| Year | Title | Director | Assistant director | Notes |
|---|---|---|---|---|
| 2017 | Cardinals | Yes | No | Co-director with Grayson Moore |
| 2021 | Learn to Swim | No | Yes | |
| 2023 | Suze | No | Yes | |
| 2024 | Shook | No | Yes | |

Shorts films

| Year | Title | Credited as | | | Notes |
| Year | Title | Director | Writer | Producer | Notes |
|---|---|---|---|---|---|
| 2012 | Alan's Study | Yes | No | Yes | Also as editor |
| 2013 | Bridges | Yes | No | No | |
| 2014 | Running Season | No | No | Yes | Also as assistant director |
| 2014 | Dorsal | Yes | No | Yes | |
| 2015 | Boxing | Yes | Yes | No | |
| 2016 | Lucy in My Eyes | No | No | Yes | Also as assistant director |
| 2017 | Come Back | Yes | No | No | Co-director with Hannah Emily Anderson |
| 2017 | Deerbrook | Yes | Yes | No | Co-writer with Grayson Moore |
| 2018 | Memorial | Yes | No | No | |
| 2018 | A Girl Named C | No | No | Yes | |
| 2024 | Last We Left Off | Yes | No | No | |

Assistant director only

- Glitter's Wild Women (2018)

Television

| Year | Title | Credited as | | Notes |
| Year | Title | Assistant director | Driver | Notes |
|---|---|---|---|---|
| 2020 | Short Term Sentence | Yes | No | |
| 2020 | Avocado Toast | Yes | No | |
| 2021 | Slasher | No | Yes | |
| 2023 | Slip | Yes | No | Third assistant |
| 2024 | My Dead Mom | Yes | No | |
| 2025 | The Z-Suite | Yes | No | |
| 2025 | Motorheads | Yes | No | |

== Awards and nominations ==
| Year | Award | Work | Category | Result | Ref. |
|---|---|---|---|---|---|
| 2013 | International Film Festival of Wales | Bridges | Best Short Film | Nominated | |
| 2013 | International Film Festival of Wales | Bridges | Best Director | Nominated | |
| 2015 | NSI Online Short Film Festival | Dorsal | Best Film | Won | |
| 2017 | Stockholm International Film Festival | Cardinals | Impact Award | Nominated | |
| 2018 | Atlanta Film Festival | Cardinals | Best Narrative Feature | Nominated | |
| 2018 | Sitges Film Festival | Deerbrook | Best Virtual Reality Film | Won | |
| 2019 | Canadian Screen Awards | Deerbrook | Best Direction, Web Program or Series | Won | |
