= Ari Posner =

Canadian film and television composer

Ari Posner (born 1970) is a Canadian film and television composer, most noted as a multiple Gemini Award and Canadian Screen Award winner for his television scores.

A native of Winnipeg, Manitoba, he moved to Toronto, Ontario, in 1989 to study music at York University. He is a frequent collaborator with composer Amin Bhatia. He has also been a record producer, most notably on Jen Gould's album Music Soup, which was the winner of the Juno Award for Children's Album of the Year at the Juno Awards of 2008.

== Filmography ==
=== Film ===
- Hand - 1998
- Scalpers - 2000
- The World's Most Fabulous Object - 2007
- Rewind - 2008
- Bedwetter - 2008
- Eating Buccaneers - 2008
- Love Letter from an Open Grave - 2010
- My Awkward Sexual Adventure - 2012
- The Defector: Escape from North Korea - 2012
- All the Wrong Reasons - 2013
- Kissing Drew - 2013
- Survival Guide - 2014
- I Am Syd Stone - 2014
- Butterflies - 2014
- Hit Men - 2014
- The Boy - 2015
- After the Ball - 2015
- My Enemy, My Brother - 2015
- Borealis - 2015
- Hard Close - 2016
- All Yours - 2016
- Prison Fight - 2016
- Tulipani, Love, Honour and a Bicycle (Tulipani, Liefde, Eer en een Fiets) - 2017
- Animal - 2017
- The Superfood Chain - 2018
- At the Back - 2020
- A Brief History of the Unicorn - 2021
- The End of Sex - 2022

=== Television ===
- Wanna Play? - 2000
- Patti - 2002
- My School Partner's an Astro Bot - 2002-03
- King - 2003
- Franny's Feet - 2003-10
- Life and Times - 2005
- Recipe for a Perfect Christmas - 2005
- Get Ed - 2005-06
- The Doodlebops - 2005-07
- Johnny Test - 2006-14
- My Gym Partner's a Monkey - 2005-08
- Flashpoint - 2008-12
- Doodlebops Rockin' Road Show - 2010
- 24 Hour Rental - 2014
- My Daughter Must Live - 2014
- Not with My Daughter - 2014
- The Madcap Learning Adventure - 2014
- X Company - 2015-17
- Supernoobs - 2015-18
- The Civil War: Brothers Divided - 2016-17
- Anne with an E - 2017-19
- Carter - 2018-19
- Let's Go Luna! - 2018-22
- Northern Rescue - 2019
- Love's March - 2021
- A Chance for Christmas - 2021
- Ghosts of Christmas Past - 2021
- Detention Adventure - 2020-22
- Home for a Royal Heart - 2022
- House of Chains - 2022
- Rosie's Rules - 2022
- Sullivan's Crossing - 2022
- Less Than Kosher - 2022

== Awards ==
Award	Category	Year	Work	Result	Ref(s)
Gemini Awards	Best Original Music, Animation	2005	King: "Stolen Voices"	Won	
Gemini Awards	Best Original Music, Animation	2008	Johnny Test: "Johnny vs. Bling-Bling 3, Stinkin' Johnny"	Nominated	
Gemini Awards	Best Original Music, Fiction	2009	Flashpoint: "Planets Aligned"	Nominated	
Gemini Awards	Best Original Music, Fiction	2010	Flashpoint: "One Wrong Move"	Nominated	
Gemini Awards	Best Original Music, Fiction	2011	Flashpoint: "Acceptable Risk"	Nominated	
Canadian Screen Awards	Best Original Score for a Series	2013	Flashpoint: "Day Game"	Won	
Canadian Screen Awards	Best Original Score for a Series	2015	24 Hour Rental: "Through the Looking Glass"	Nominated	
Canadian Screen Awards	Best Original Score for a Series	2016	X Company: "Trial by Fire"	Nominated	
Canadian Screen Awards	Best Original Score for a Series	2017	X Company: "Black Flag"	Nominated	
Canadian Screen Awards	Best Original Score, Fiction	2018	Anne with an E: "Remorse Is the Poison of Life"	Nominated	
Canadian Screen Awards	Best Original Score, Fiction	2018	X Company: "Remembrance"	Nominated	
Canadian Screen Awards	Best Original Score, Fiction	2019	Anne with an E: "I Protest Against Any Absolute Conclusion"	Nominated	
Canadian Screen Awards	Best Original Score, Fiction	2020	Anne with an E: "The Summit of My Desires"	Won	
Canadian Screen Awards	Best Original Score, Fiction	2020	Carter: "Harley Gets Replaced"	Nominated	
Canadian Screen Awards	Best Original Music, Animation	2020	Let's Go Luna!: "Bob the Plant"	Nominated	
Canadian Screen Awards	Best Original Music, Fiction	2021	Detention Adventure: "All the World's a Stage"	Won	
Canadian Screen Awards	Best Original Music, Animation	2021	Let's Go Luna!: "Monster Park/Meet the Strongs"	Won	
Canadian Screen Awards	Best Original Music, Animation	2022	Let's Go Luna!: "The Way of the Gaucho"	Won	
Canadian Screen Awards	Best Original Score	2023	The End of Sex	Nominated	
Canadian Screen Awards	Best Original Music, Animation	2023	Let's Go Luna!: "Dig It Daddy-O"	Won	
Canadian Screen Awards	Best Original Music, Comedy	2023	Detention Adventure: "Singing in the Raign"	Nominated	
Primetime Emmy Awards	Outstanding Original Main Title Theme Music	2006	Get Ed	Nominated	
