= My Awkward Sexual Adventure =

2012 film by Sean Garrity

- Theatrical release poster
- Directed by: Sean Garrity
- Written by: Jonas Chernick
- Produced by: Juliette Hagopian; Jonas Chernick
- Starring: Jonas Chernick; Emily Hampshire; Sarah Manninen
- Cinematography: Gavin Smith
- Edited by: John Gurdebeke
- Music by: Ari Posner
- Production companies: Julijette; Banana-Moon Sky Films; Kosher Sexy Films
- Distributed by: Phase 4 Films; Tribeca Films
- Release date: September 8, 2012 (Toronto International Film Festival)
- Running time: 98 minutes
- Country: Canada
- Language: English

My Awkward Sexual Adventure (or An Awkward Sexual Adventure) is a 2012 Canadian sex comedy film directed by Sean Garrity and written by Jonas Chernick. The film stars Chernick as Jordan, a sexually uptight accountant who enlists Julia (Emily Hampshire), an exotic dancer, to instruct him in the world of sexual adventure.

== Plot ==
Jordan Abrams, a conservative Jewish accountant, lives a stable but rather boring life with his girlfriend Rachel Stern. The night before they are supposed to leave for an extended vacation where Jordan had been planning to propose, Rachel says she cannot marry him due to his sexual ineptitude. Rachel leaves him in order to explore her own sexuality.

Determined to change so that he can win Rachel back, Jordan first seeks advice from his lady-killer friend Dandak, who advises him to try attending a strip club. While there, he meets stripper Julia and buys her chips from the club vending machine when she has no money, for the sole reason of "good karma payback". After Jordan drinks too much and is thrown out into the back trash pile, where he is then robbed of his pants. Julia finds him and, out of a guilty conscience, brings him back to her place to sleep off the alcohol.

Next morning, Jordan wakes up in Julia's apartment and happens to see her financial papers showing a large amount of debt, as well as boxes of sex toys and a spotless kitchen. Julia gives Jordan some cookies which are the best Jordan has ever tasted; it turns out Julia is a talented cook as well as a dancer. Jordan recruits Julia to be his teacher to broaden his sexual horizons, in exchange for managing her finances.

Together, they explore strip clubs, sensual massage parlors, cross-dressing, oral sex techniques, and sadomasochism. Meanwhile, Rachel tries to live a wild sex life of her own, dating several men, having group sex, and attending sexy costume parties, but is consistently left thoroughly unsatisfied by her experiences.

One night, in Julia's apartment and under her direction, Jordan handcuffs and gags Julia in order to practice a dominant posture, and Rachel chooses that moment to show up and beg Jordan to come back to her. Rachel sees and hears him with the bound Julia and impulsively runs from the apartment. Jordan runs after her. While they try to reconcile on the stairs, repo men ascend past them to Julia's apartment, remove all her furniture and rob her of all the cash in her savings box, while she remains helplessly bound. Jordan later apologizes for the incident and helps work with Julia to get some of her belongings back; Julia accepts his apology and helps him learn proper oral sex technique, only to react with pain when she realizes he has chewing gum in his mouth while performing the act. After Jordan helps Julia wash away the sensation in the shower, the two share a passionate kiss. However, when Jordan exits the bathroom, Dandak pressures him to win Rachel back. Julia admits her growing feelings for Jordan through the bathroom door, only to find that he has left to go to Rachel, leaving her heartbroken and confused.

Jordan eventually decides not to get back together with Rachel after all, as he comes to realize he loves Julia. After agonizing, Jordan returns to the strip club where he first met Julia to reconcile with her, but, still hurt, she refuses to speak to him. A month later, she receives an invitation in the mail to the opening of a new restaurant. Arriving at the location, she realizes that Jordan has bought a nearby vacant building and has transformed it into the restaurant she has always wanted to own. He invites her on as his chef and awkwardly stammers out a declaration of love for her, and a tearful and moved Julia kisses him. The film ends with the sounds of the couple preparing for their first time together, juxtaposed with a shot of them blissfully asleep in bed together.

== Cast ==
- Jonas Chernick as Jordan
- Sarah Manninen as Rachel
- Emily Hampshire as Julia
- Vik Sahay as Dandak
- Melissa Marie Elias as Reshma
- Marina Stephenson Kerr as Ruth

== Release ==
My Awkward Sexual Adventure premiered at the 2012 Toronto International Film Festival. It subsequently screened at the 2012 Whistler Film Festival, where it won the Audience Award.

It received a limited theatrical release in Canada in April 2013.

== Reception ==
Rotten Tomatoes, a review aggregator, reports that 63% of eight surveyed critics gave the film a positive review; the average rating was 6.1/10. John Anderson of Variety called Hampshire's acting "a winning performance" but stated the film was "unimaginable as a remake, or playing anywhere outside latenight cable." Robert Bell of Exclaim! wrote, "It's all incredibly racist and misogynist, but is too excessively ignorant to have any real sense of this." Peter Howell of the Toronto Star wrote, "It’s your standard nerd-meets-stripper scenario, but filmmaking sparks and a combustible cast set this rom-com blazing." David D'Arcy of Screen Daily called it a quirky Canadian satire that might not draw U.S. audiences. Brett Cullum of DVD Verdict wrote, "There is a fun romantic comedy here underneath all the gross-out near-porn."
