= Bec Pecaut =

Bec Pecaut is a Canadian filmmaker, whose 2024 short film Are You Scared to Be Yourself Because You Think That You Might Fail? won the award for Best Canadian Short Film at the 2024 Toronto International Film Festival.

The child of urbanist David Pecaut, Bec was educated at the Gallatin School of Individualized Study and the USC School of Cinematic Arts. They were credited as a producer on Annabelle Attanasio's 2015 short film Drooler, and have directed music videos for artists including Devan, RIP and Emily Yacina.

In addition to its award win at TIFF, Are You Scared to Be Yourself Because You Think That You Might Fail? was named to the festival's year-end Canada's Top Ten list for 2024, and received a Canadian Screen Award nomination for Best Live Action Short Drama at the 13th Canadian Screen Awards in 2025.

Their feature film debut, The Terrible Child, is in development. In 2026, they were selected for the Sundance Institute's Directors Lab program for emerging filmmakers.
