= Mary Long =

Mary Long may refer to:

- Mary Long (soccer) (born 2007), American soccer player
- Mary Beth Long (born 1963), American businesswoman and former U.S. government official
- Mary Elitch Long (1856–1936), one of the original owners of Elitch Gardens in Denver, Colorado
- Mary "Polly" Long, first wife of Tobias Lear V
- "Mary Long", a song by Deep Purple from their 1973 album Who Do We Think We Are
