= George Baptist =

George Baptist (7 January 1808 – 11 May 1875) was a logging contractor, born in Scotland and emigrated to Canada in 1832.

Baptist first lived in Dorchester County, Quebec where he found employment in the sawmills there. These were owned by Sir John Caldwell and gave him valuable experience for his future endeavours. In 1846, he bought a sawmill in the Saint-Maurice region; which had been owned by Edward Greive, a member of the 2nd Parliament of the Province of Canada. Greive had died in 1845 and the mill was abandoned.

Shortly after his purchase, the government became heavily involved in the timber industry. By 1852, a commission led by Étienne Parent was proposing a policy of crown lands grants. Trois-Rivières became the centre of this increased activity and George Baptist one of the important businessmen.

Baptist brought innovation and prosperity to the lumber industry and it made him a prime example of the bourgeois class of Trois-Rivières.
