= Sean Garrity (director) =

Canadian film director and screenwriter

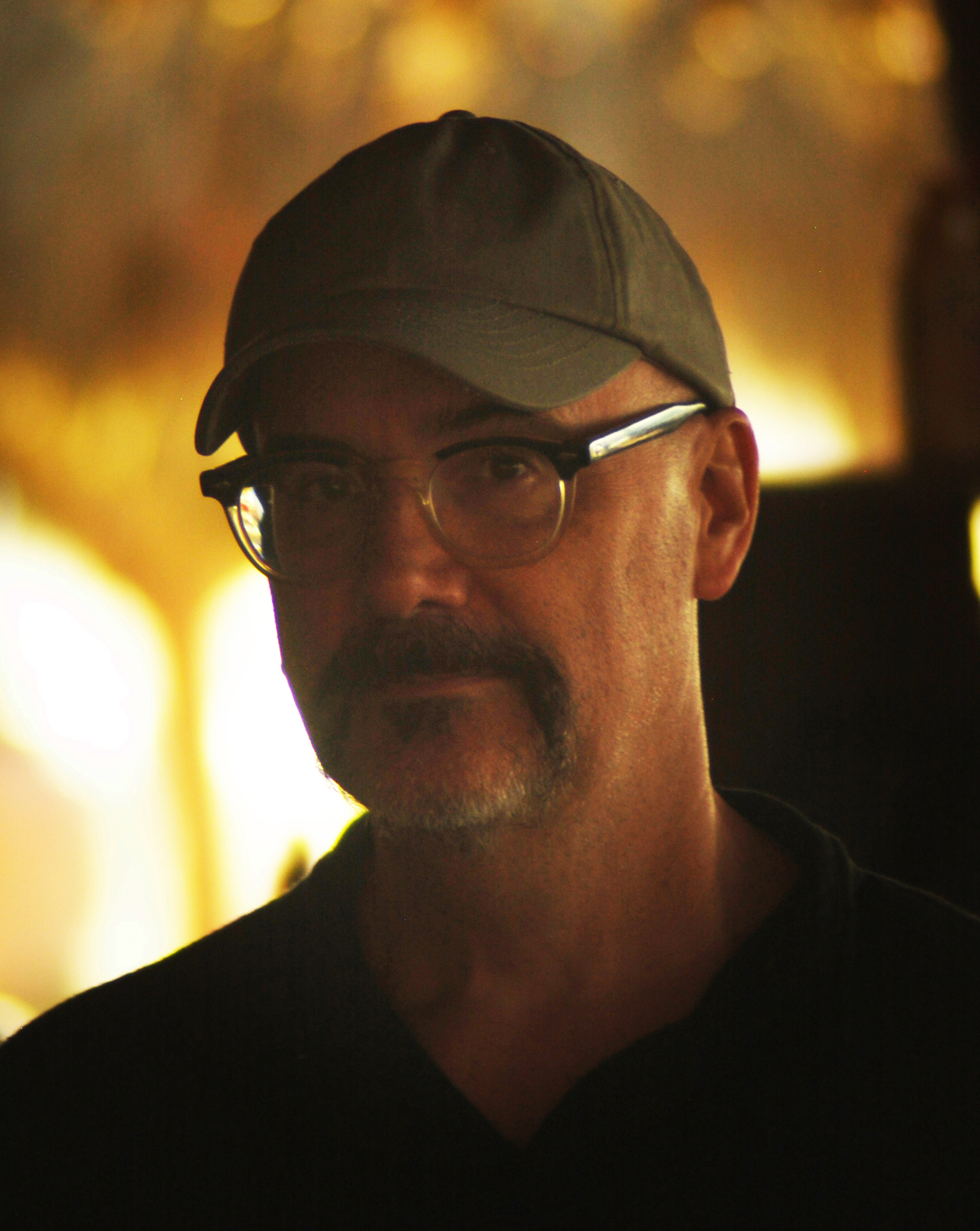
- Born: Winnipeg, Manitoba, Canada
- Occupations: film director, screenwriter
- Years active: 2000s–present
- Notable work: Inertia, My Awkward Sexual Adventure

Sean Garrity is a Canadian film director and screenwriter. He is best known for his 2001 film Inertia, which won the award for Best Canadian First Feature Film at the 2001 Toronto International Film Festival, and his 2012 film My Awkward Sexual Adventure.

== Filmography ==
- Inertia (2001)
- Lucid (2005)
- Zooey & Adam (2009)
- Teeth (short film) (2011)
- My Awkward Sexual Adventure (2012)
- Blood Pressure (2012)
- After the Ball (2015)
- Borealis (2015)
- I Propose We Never See Each Other Again After Tonight (2020)
- The End of Sex (2022)
- The Burning Season (2023)
