= Whistler Film Festival =

Annual film festival held in Whistler, Canada

The Whistler Film Festival (WFF) is an annual film festival held in Whistler, British Columbia, Canada. Established in 2001, the festival is held the first weekend of December and includes juried competitive sections, the Borsos Awards, and the Pandora Audience Award. A conference for the Canadian film industry, known as the Whistler Summit, is organised in connection with the film festival.

The festival has built up a reputation as one of the most important Canadian film festivals despite its location in a much smaller community than most of the other major festivals, particularly as a premiere venue for Canadian independent films. Some film critics have even gone so far as to suggest that the festival is emerging as Canada's equivalent to the influential American Sundance Film Festival.

As of 2015, the Whistler Film Festival bills itself as "Canada's coolest film festival" and has been increasingly attracting more distributors and sales agents. The 2015 festival presented the Canadian premiere of Carol and the world premiere of Rehearsal among other world premieres. Paul Gratton, served as the festival's Director of Programming from 2012-2023 with Robin Smith filling the role from 2024-present. Gratton referred to the Whistler Film Festival as a "mini-Sundance" for Canadian films.

Due to the COVID-19 pandemic in Canada, the 2020 festival was staged entirely online. While most other Canadian film festivals which were staged online in 2020 geoblocked their service so that only viewers within the festival's home province were able to watch the films, Whistler made virtually its entire lineup available across Canada. In the same year, the festival also launched the Adventure Film Series, a summer program of films about adventure sports.

In 2026, filmmaker Josh Epstein was named the festival's new executive director.

== Film competitions and awards ==
The Whistler Film Festival features eight juried competitions with the following awards handed out at the Awards Brunch on the last day of the festival or post-event:

- Borsos Competition: ($15,000 cash award presented by the Directors Guild of Canada – British Columbia with a $20,000 Post Production Prize sponsored by Company 3 LLC for winning film); Best Direction in a Borsos film presented by the Directors Guild of Canada – British Columbia; Best Cinematography in a Borsos film presented by ICG 669; Best Performance in a Borsos film; and Best Screenplay of a Borsos film. The Borsos Awards are named after Canadian filmmaker Phillip Borsos.
- Best Feature Documentary
- Mountain Culture Award presented by Whistler Blackcomb
- Canadian ShortWork Award ($1,000 cash award)
- International ShortWork Award
- Student ShortWork Award ($500 cash award), presented by Capilano University Film Centre
- Best BC Directors Award presented by the Directors Guild of Canada – British Columbia
- Alliance of Women Film Journalists EDA Awards for Best Female-Directed Narrative Feature, Short Film and Documentary
- MPPIA Short Film Award ($15,000 cash award plus up to $100,000 in services) presented by MPPIA and Creative BC, sponsored by Bridge Studios
- Audience Award for Best Feature of the Festival (non-cash prize)
- Whistler Film Festival Power Pitch Award for Best Pitch of the Festival event (36K prize c2024)
