= Tokyo Trial (miniseries) =

2016 television miniseries

- Promotional poster
- Kanji: 東京裁判
- Genre: Historical drama
- Written by: Rob W. King; Max Mannix; Toru Takagi; Kees van Beijnum
- Directed by: Pieter Verhoeff; Rob W. King
- Starring: Tim Ahern; Paul Freeman; Serge Hazanavicius; Marcel Hensema; William Hope; Jonathan Hyde; Michael Ironside; Irrfan Khan; Stephen McHattie; David K.S. Tse; Shinya Tsukamoto; Julian Wadham; Hadewych Minis
- Narrated by: Stacy Keach
- Composer: Robert Carli
- Country of origin: Japan; Canada; Netherlands
- Original languages: Japanese; English
- No. of series: 1
- No. of episodes: 4

Production
- Executive producers: Don Carmody; David Cormican; Hans de Weers; Takashi Enjo
- Producers: Shinsuke Naitô; David Cormican; Hans de Weers
- Production locations: Japan; Lithuania
- Cinematography: Rolf Dekens
- Editor: Daryl K. Davis
- Running time: 45 minutes
- Production companies: NHK; FATT Productions; Don Carmody Television

Original release
- Network: NHK
- Release: 12 December – 15 December 2016

Tokyo Trial is a 2016 historical drama miniseries that depicts the International Military Tribunal for the Far East. An international co-production of Japanese public broadcaster NHK, Dutch studio FATT Productions, and Canadian producers David Cormican and Don Carmody, the series was directed by Pieter Verhoeff and Rob W. King.

It stars an ensemble cast, featuring Paul Freeman, Serge Hazanavicius, Marcel Hensema, Jonathan Hyde, Irrfan Khan, Stephen McHattie, Michael Ironside, Hadewych Minis and Shinya Tsukamoto, with narration by Stacy Keach.

The series premiered in Japan on NHK in four 45-minute episodes, between December 12 and December 15, 2016. Thereafter, it was made available on the NHK On-Demand VoD service and subsequently by Netflix. Overseas, the series premiered in 190 countries on Netflix in December 2016.

== Premise ==
Following the end of the Second World War with the surrender of Japan, an international tribunal of judges from the victorious powers are tasked with determining the fate of Japanese war criminals.

== Cast ==
Judges

- Tim Ahern as Major General Myron C. Cramer, representing the United States
- Paul Freeman as The Honourable Lord William D. Patrick, representing the United Kingdom
- Serge Hazanavicius as Henri Bernard, representing France
- Marcel Hensema as Professor Bert V.A. Röling, representing the Netherlands
- Jonathan Hyde as President Sir William Webb, representing Australia
- Irrfan Khan as Radhabinod Pal, representing British India
- Stephen McHattie as Edward Stuart McDougall, representing Canada
- David K.S. Tse as Mei Ju-ao, representing the Republic of China
- Julian Wadham as Sir Erima H. Northcroft, representing New Zealand
- Bert Matias as Colonel Delfín Jaranilla, representing Philippines
- Kestutis Stasys Jakstas as Major General I.M. Zaryanov, representing the Soviet Union
- William Hope as John P. Higgins, representing the United States

Other cast

- Michael Ironside as General Douglas MacArthur
- Hadewych Minis as Eta Harich-Schneider
- Shinya Tsukamoto as Michio Takeyama
- Jules Knight as Quentin-Quentin Baker
- Stacy Keach as the voice of the narrator

== Production ==
The miniseries was proposed by Japanese public broadcaster NHK. The company signed a co-production deal with FATT Productions. At the OMDC's International Financing Forum at TIFF 2013, NHK and FATT officials discussed co-producing the series with Don Carmody Television. Netflix gained streaming rights for the series by providing financing through Don Carmody Television.

=== Filming ===
The series was filmed in Japan and Lithuania in 2015.

== Awards and nominations ==
November 2017	iEMMY AWARDS NIGHT held in New York	Best TV Movie MiniSeries	Nominee : "Tokyo Trial"	Result: won 2nd Place	Ref.
2017	45th International Emmy Awards	Best TV Movie/Mini-Series	—N/a	Nominated	
