= Military Law Academy =

Military Law Academy may refer to:

- Alexander Military Law Academy (1867–1917), Russian Empire
- Red Army Military Law Academy (1939–1956), Soviet Union
