= David Cormican =

Canadian film and television producer

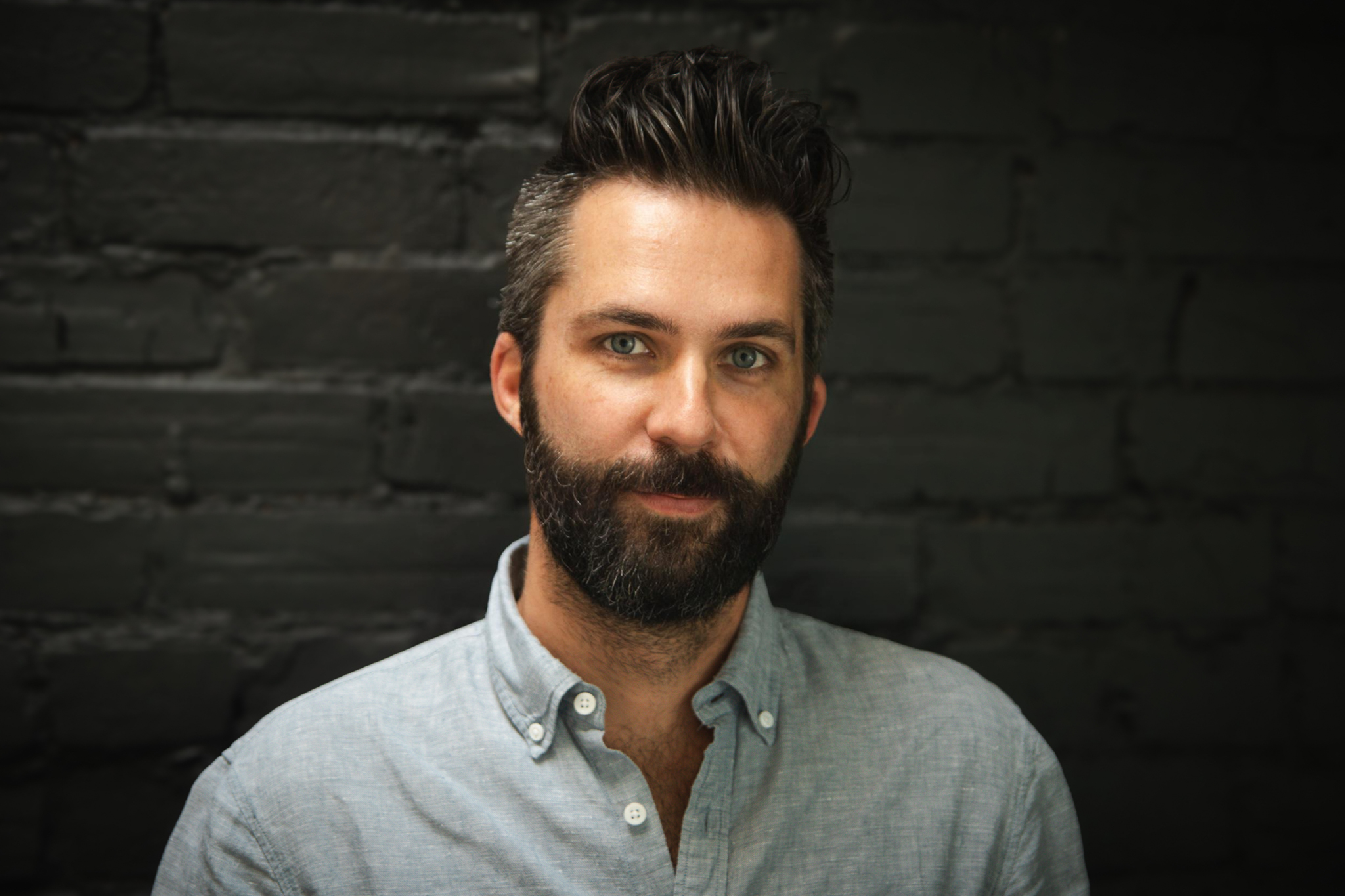
- Cormican in 2024.
- Born: 1981 or 1982 (age 44–45)
- Education: Grant MacEwan College; Gaiety School of Acting; New York Film Academy
- Occupations: Film producer, Television producer, showrunner, screenwriter
- Years active: 2008–present
- Organization: Fun Republic Pictures
- Known for: Tokyo Trial; Northern Rescue; Between; Something Pointless

David Cormican is a Canadian film and television producer, showrunner and screenwriter, and a producer of the International Emmy-nominated NHK miniseries Tokyo Trial. He was president and co-founder of Don Carmody Television from 2013 to 2023, and is the founder and chief executive officer of Fun Republic Pictures. His other producing credits include Between, Netflix's first Canadian original series, and Northern Rescue, which he co-created and on which he served as showrunner.

== Early life and education ==
Cormican attended Catholic Central High School in Lethbridge, Alberta, where he took part in drama. He graduated from the theatre arts program at Grant MacEwan College (now MacEwan University) and worked as a stage actor, including touring schools in Alberta and British Columbia with Alberta Opera. During this period he studied Irish theatre at the Gaiety School of Acting in Dublin and later attended the New York Film Academy. He then moved to Toronto, where a comedy series he created placed second in a pitch competition at the Just for Laughs festival.

== Career ==
=== Early career and Minds Eye Entertainment ===
Cormican then joined Minds Eye Entertainment in Saskatchewan as vice-president of development, where he executive produced feature films. In 2011 he was elected to the board of directors of the Canadian Media Production Association (now the Canadian Media Producers Association) as a Prairie-region member. His executive producer credits include Faces in the Crowd (2011), starring Milla Jovovich; The Tall Man (2012), starring Jessica Biel; and the Minds Eye science-fiction thriller Stranded, directed by Roger Christian and starring Christian Slater, which began filming in Regina in July 2012. In 2013 he acquired screen rights to The Jane Austen Marriage Manual.

=== Don Carmody Television (2013–2023) ===
In 2013 Cormican co-founded Don Carmody Television (DCTV) with Don Carmody and served as its president until 2023. He worked with Carmody on the film 13 Eerie (2013). DCTV productions included the Lifetime miniseries The Secret Life of Marilyn Monroe (2015), which received Primetime Emmy Award nominations; Between (2015–2016), co-commissioned by Rogers Media and Netflix as Netflix's first Canadian original series; and the NHK co-production Tokyo Trial (2016), which was nominated for the International Emmy Award for TV Movie/Mini-Series in 2017. With Carmody, Cormican co-produced Shadowhunters, an adaptation of The Mortal Instruments, for ABC Family with Constantin Film.

Northern Rescue, created by Cormican with Mark Bacci and Dwayne Hill, was developed and financed by DCTV, with Cormican as showrunner. It premiered on March 1, 2019, as the first original series on CBC Gem, launching simultaneously on Netflix worldwide. The series was nominated in the Children/Youth category at the 2020 Venice TV Award, with Cormican listed as executive producer and producer.

Cormican was a producer of Tulipani, Love, Honour and a Bicycle (2017), directed by Mike van Diem, which premiered at the 2017 Toronto International Film Festival.

=== Fun Republic Pictures (2016–present) ===
Cormican founded Fun Republic Pictures in 2016.

In 2023 Cormican produced Réveillon, a Slovakia–Canada co-production and the debut feature of director Michal Kunes Kováč; Cormican also co-wrote the screenplay. The film was released in Slovakia in September 2023. In 2024 Fun Republic Pictures was reported to have a slate of feature films and series planned for virtual production stages in Saskatchewan and Ontario. He was a producer of the action comedy Hostile Takeover, starring Michael Jai White, which Quiver Distribution released in August 2025. Later productions include #VanLife, the scripted feature debut of Métis filmmaker Trevor Cameron, on which Cormican was an executive producer; it was shot entirely in a virtual production studio. #VanLife was nominated for Best Feature Drama/Comedy at the 2026 Yorkton Film Festival.

In 2026 Cormican was an executive producer of Alien Boy, the feature debut of director Fawaz Al-Matrouk, starring Sarah Gadon and Waleed Zuaiter, which was filmed in Saskatchewan.

In 2024 Cormican signed with Paradigm Talent Agency.

=== Canadian Short Screenplay Competition ===
Cormican founded the Canadian Short Screenplay Competition in 2008 and ran it with the Yorkton Film Festival until 2013; he relaunched the competition with the festival in 2024. He has produced several of its winning screenplays as short films. Rusted Pyre (2012), directed by Laurence Cohen from a screenplay by Daniel Audet, was selected for the National Screen Institute's 2010–11 NSI Drama Prize, a program that gives selected writer, director and producer teams training, mentorship and cash and in-kind support to produce a short film; Cormican was the team's producer. The film screened at the 2011 Cannes Film Festival as part of Telefilm Canada's Not Short on Talent programme. Will, a First World War drama also directed by Cohen, won the Golden Sheaf Award for Drama at the 2013 Yorkton Film Festival.

Something Pointless (2026) is based on Neil Graham's screenplay that won the competition in 2010; Graham is credited with the story, and Graham and Cormican with the screenplay. Directed by Asa Bailey, it stars Leo Harris, Owen Teale, Sophie Thompson and Sule Rimi. Shot in Newport, Wales, it premiered at the USA Film Festival in Dallas in 2026. The film won the Let's Include award at the 2026 Bengaluru International Short Film Festival, was nominated for the John Hefin Award for Best Short Film Made in Wales at the Carmarthen Bay Film Festival, and was nominated for Best Short Drama/Comedy (Under 15 Minutes) at the 2026 Yorkton Film Festival. In August 2026 the film had a one-week theatrical release at San Francisco's Roxie Theater.

== Awards and recognition ==
| Year | Organization | Award / recognition | Work | Result | Ref. |
|---|---|---|---|---|---|
| 2010 | National Screen Institute | NSI Drama Prize (2010–11) | Rusted Pyre | Selected | |
| 2012 | Playback | 10 to Watch | — | Won | |
| 2013 | Yorkton Film Festival | Golden Sheaf Award – Drama | Will | Won | |
| 2014 | The Hollywood Reporter | Next Generation Canada | — | Won | |
| 2015 | Playback | The New Establishment | — | Won | |
| 2016 | MacEwan University | Distinguished Alumnus Award | — | Won | |
| 2017 | International Emmy Awards | TV Movie/Mini-Series | Tokyo Trial | Nominated | |
| 2020 | Venice TV Award | Children/Youth | Northern Rescue | Nominated | |
| 2026 | Bengaluru International Short Film Festival | Let's Include | Something Pointless | Won | |
| 2026 | Carmarthen Bay Film Festival | John Hefin Award for Best Short Film Made in Wales | Something Pointless | Nominated | |
| 2026 | Yorkton Film Festival | Golden Sheaf Award – Short Drama/Comedy (Under 15 Minutes) | Something Pointless | Nominated | |

== Filmography ==
=== Film ===
| Year | Title | Credit | Notes |
|---|---|---|---|
| 2011 | Faces in the Crowd | Executive producer | |
| 2012 | The Tall Man | Executive producer | |
| 2013 | 13 Eerie | Executive producer | |
| 2013 | Stranded | Executive producer | |
| 2017 | Tulipani, Love, Honour and a Bicycle | Producer | |
| 2023 | Réveillon | Producer; screenplay (with Tomáš Dušička and Maroš Hečko) | Slovakia–Canada co-production |
| 2025 | Hostile Takeover | Producer | |
| 2026 | #VanLife | Executive producer | APTN |
| TBA | Alien Boy | Executive producer | Post-production |

=== Short film ===
| Year | Title | Credit | Notes |
|---|---|---|---|
| 2012 | Rusted Pyre | Producer | Screened at Cannes 2011 (Not Short on Talent) |
| 2012 | Will | Producer | Golden Sheaf Award, Drama |
| 2026 | Something Pointless | Producer; screenplay (with Neil Graham) | Story by Neil Graham |

=== Television ===
| Year | Title | Credit | Notes |
|---|---|---|---|
| 2015 | The Secret Life of Marilyn Monroe | Producer | Miniseries, Lifetime |
| 2015–2016 | Between | Executive producer, producer | City / Netflix |
| 2016 | Tokyo Trial | Executive producer, producer | Miniseries, NHK / Netflix |
| 2016–2019 | Shadowhunters | Producer | Freeform |
| 2019 | Northern Rescue | Co-creator, writer, showrunner, executive producer, producer | CBC Gem / Netflix |
