= Jaranilla =

Jaranilla is a Filipino surname. Notable people with the surname include:

- Delfín Jaranilla (1883–1980), Filipino judge
- Zaijian Jaranilla (born 2001), Filipino actor
- Zymic Jaranilla (born 2004), Filipino actor, brother of Zaijian
