= Henri Bernard =

Henri Bernard may refer to:

- Henri Bernard (magistrate) (1899–1986), French magistrate and judge
- Henri Bernard (athlete) (1900–1967), French hurdler
- Henri Bernard (footballer) (1914–1942), Swiss footballer
- Henri Bernard (historian) (1900–1987), Belgian military historian
