= Oka Takazumi =

Japanese admiral and politician (1890–1973)

Takazumi Oka
- 岡 敬純
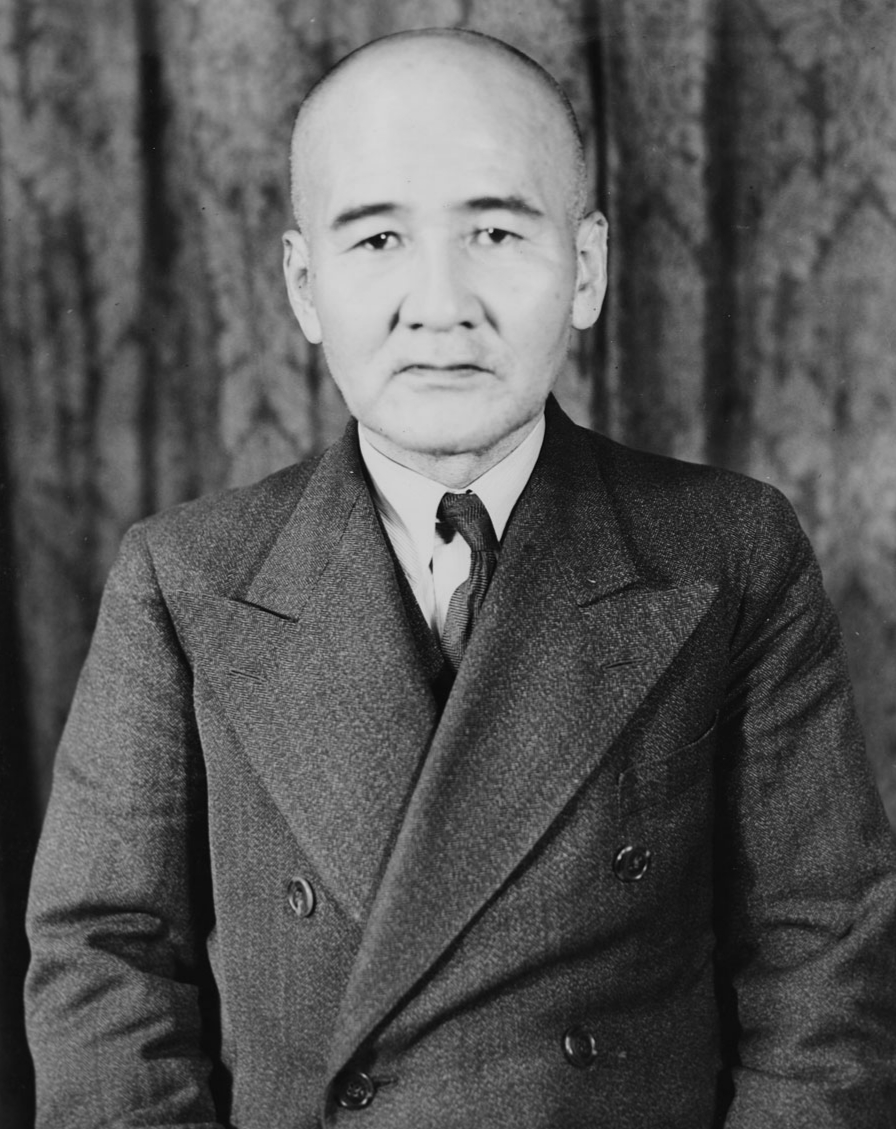
- Oka in 1947

Chief of the Naval Affairs Bureau
- In office 1940–1944
- Monarch: Hirohito

Personal details
- Born: February 11, 1890
- Died: December 4, 1973 (aged 83)
- Education: Imperial Japanese Naval Academy; Naval Staff College

Military service
- Allegiance: Empire of Japan
- Branch/service: Imperial Japanese Navy
- Years of service: 1911–1945
- Rank: Vice admiral
- Battles/wars: World War II

Takazumi Oka (岡 敬純, Oka Takazumi; February 11, 1890 – December 4, 1973) was a vice admiral in the Imperial Japanese Navy and a politician. He served as Chief of the Naval Affairs Bureau from 1940 to 1944. He was convicted of war crimes during World War II, sentenced to life in prison, and later granted parole due to health problems.

== Biography ==
Oka as a midshipman, 1911–1912

Oka was born on February 11, 1890, and graduated from the 39th class of the Imperial Japanese Naval Academy in 1911. He subsequently completed his education at the Naval Staff College in 1923. In October 1940, he was appointed Chief of the Naval Affairs Bureau. In this capacity, he directly presided over policy-making within the Imperial Japanese Navy.

Following the end of World War II, Oka was prosecuted as a war criminal during the International Military Tribunal for the Far East. Upon being convicted, he was sentenced to life imprisonment. In 1954, he was granted parole for health reasons. The War Crimes Tribunal stated that he would be handed over to the custody of the Japanese Minister of Justice, and that should he recover from his illnesses, he would be expected to return to Sugamo Prison.

Oka died on December 4, 1973, aged 83.

== Sources ==
- Coox, Alvin D. (1992). "Japanese Net Assessment in the Era Before Pearl Harbor". In Murray, Williamson; Millet, Allan (eds.). Calculations: Net Assessment and the Coming of World War II. New York, N.Y.: MacMillan, Inc. ISBN 1-4165-7684-3.
- Evans, David C.; Peattie, David (1997). Kaigun: Strategy, Tactics and Technology in the Imperial Japanese Navy,1887-1941. Annapolis, MD: Naval Institute Press. ISBN 978-0-87021-192-8.
- Mei, Ju-ao (2016). The Tokyo Trial and War Crimes in Asia. Shanghai Jiao Tong University Press. ISBN 978-981-15-9812-8.
