= Northern Rescue =

Canadian drama television series

- Genre: Drama
- Created by: Mark Bacci; David Cormican; Dwayne Hill
- Starring: William Baldwin; Kathleen Robertson
- Opening theme: "Family" by Mother Mother
- Country of origin: Canada
- Original language: English
- No. of seasons: 1
- No. of episodes: 10

Production
- Executive producers: Don Carmody; David Cormican
- Producers: Don Carmody; David Cormican
- Running time: 44–45 minutes
- Production company: Don Carmody Television

Original release
- Network: CBC Gem
- Release: March 1, 2019

Northern Rescue is a Canadian drama television series produced by Don Carmody Television (DCTV), distributed by CBC Television in Canada and internationally on Netflix. The first season of 10 episodes debuted on March 1, 2019. It stars William Baldwin as a search and rescue commander who, after the death of his wife, relocates from Boston, Massachusetts with his three children to live with his sister-in-law in the fictional small town of Turtle Island Bay, Ontario, Canada, where he grew up.

== Premise ==
After his wife dies, search and rescue commander John West uproots his family, moving with his three children from Boston, Massachusetts to his rural hometown of Turtle Island Bay in Ontario, Canada. In this family drama, John and his kids each cope with their losses and grief in their own ways.

== Cast ==
- William Baldwin as John West
- Kathleen Robertson as Charlie Anders, Sarah's sister
- Michelle Nolden as Sarah West, John's deceased wife (narrates her diary and is seen in memories)
- Amalia Williamson as Madelyn "Maddie" West, John and Sarah's oldest child
- Spencer MacPherson as Scout West, John and Sarah's only son
- Taylor Thorne as Taylor West, John and Sarah's youngest child
- Sebastien Roberts as Alex, Charlie's estranged boyfriend
- Evan Marsh as Henry, Maddie's budding love interest
- Eliana Jones as Gwen, friend of Maddie and Henry
- Devyn Nekoda as Allison

== Episodes ==
No.	Title	Directed by	Written by	Original release date	Canada viewers (millions)
1	"Que Sera"	Bradley Walsh	Mark Bacci	March 1, 2019	N/A
After the death of Sarah West, the family faces some difficult choices, and relocates from Boston to the parents' Canadian hometown to live with Sarah's sister Charlie.
2	"Making Lemonade"	Bradley Walsh	Unknown	March 1, 2019	N/A
Charlie's house burns down, so the family moves into a defunct public aquarium. John meets his SAR team, and Maddie attends court-ordered therapy.
3	"Sarah's Stuff"	Gail Harvey	Unknown	March 1, 2019	N/A
The family searches Sarah's belongings for keepsakes; John rescues an injured hiker from a forest fire; Charlie needs the signature of her estranged boyfriend Alex in order to collect insurance.
4	"D-U-A-L-I-T-Y"	Gail Harvey	Unknown	March 1, 2019	N/A
Taylor is determined to win the school spelling bee; Scout clashes with a wrestling team rival; Maddie discovers her mother's diary and concludes she was cheating on her father with a man named Rick Walker.
5	"12 Months to the Day"	Eleanore Lindo	David Cormican	March 1, 2019	N/A
A blown distribution transformer leaves the town powerless and injures two teens playing a sports rivalry prank; Taylor organizes a party for her parents' anniversary; Maddie's wayward friend gets her arrested for shoplifting.
6	"The Little Things"	Eleanore Lindo	Unknown	March 1, 2019	N/A
Scout gets kicked off the wrestling team; Taylor is cyberbullied with a video of her fainting while winning the spelling bee; Maddie and Henry share a kiss while playing truth or dare.
7	"The Dividing Line"	Michael McGowan	David Cormican	March 1, 2019	N/A
John's team rescue victims of an island plane crash; Scout hides getting kicked off the team from his father; Maddie's attempt to defend Taylor backfires.
8	"The Bear"	Michael McGowan	David Cormican	March 1, 2019	N/A
Scout calls on John to help a critically injured bear; Maddie finds a letter to Rick Walker returned to her mother; Taylor makes a friend of her spelling bee rival.
9	"Wake Up"	Bradley Walsh	Unknown	March 1, 2019	N/A
John is hurt while rescuing a motocross biker and placed in an induced coma; Alex proposes to Charlie, and asks her to leave Turtle Island Bay.
10	"Dad Knows Best"	Bradley Walsh	Unknown	March 1, 2019	N/A
Charlie discovers the truth about Alex; Maddie's determination to find Rick Walker reveals an ugly family secret: he is actually her biological father, and had been blackmailing her mother.

== Production ==
The show is produced in Ontario by Don Carmody Television (DCTV). It is streamed in Canada on CBC Television's CBC Gem service and distributed internationally on Netflix.

The first season of 10 episodes debuted on both services on March 1, 2019. Northern Rescue was filmed in Parry Sound, a town in Ontario, and in Toronto, Canada.

== Reception ==
The series received limited critic reviews in the United States, and reactions of both critics and audience members was mixed. As of the end of 2023, there has been no word about the show's demise or return of the series since the hiatus because of the Covid pandemic.
