= Ivan Michyevich Zaryanov =

Russian judge

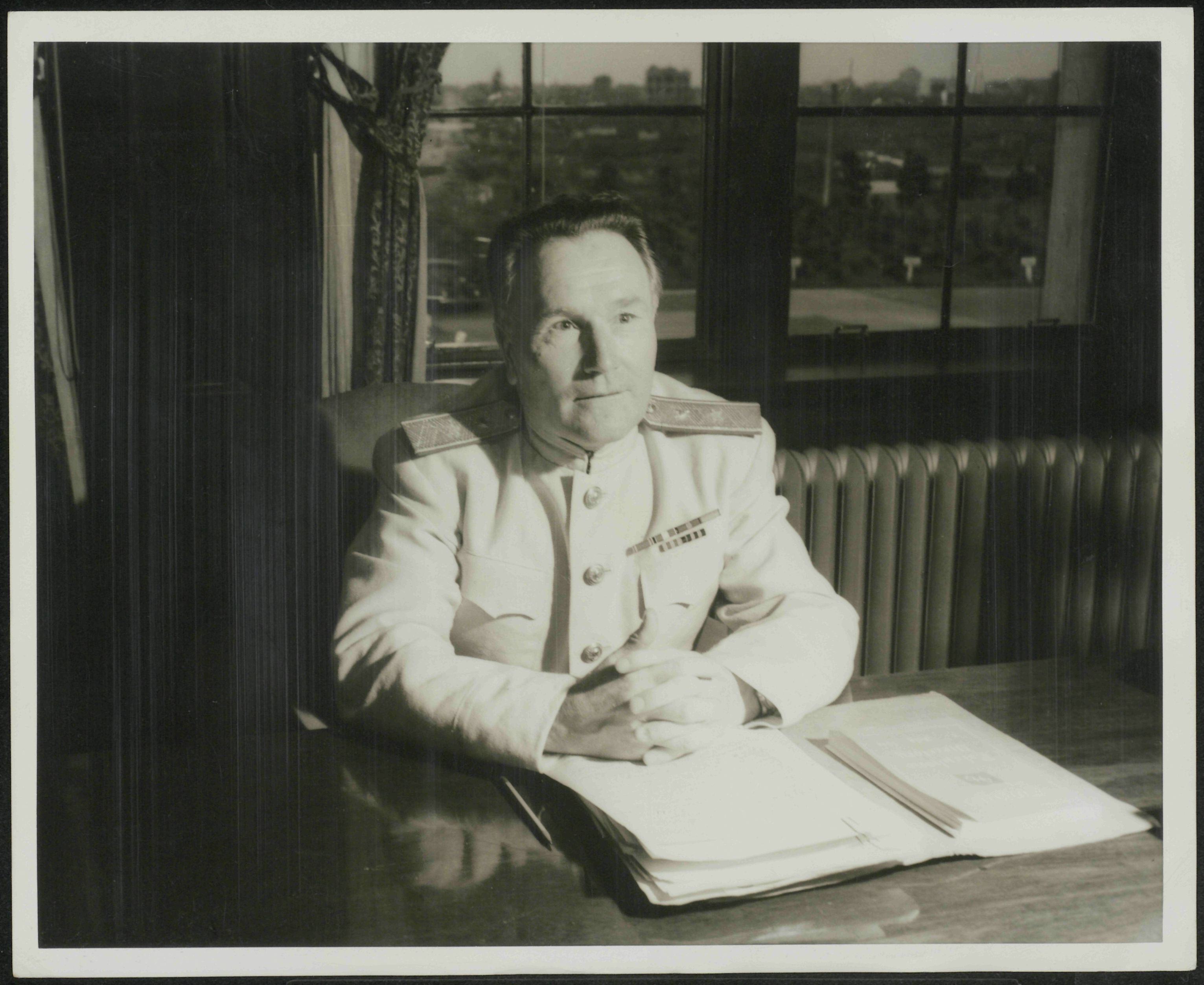
Ivan Michyevich Zaryanov in Tokyo, Japan

Ivan Michyevich Zaryanov (Russian: Иван Михеевич Зарянов; 26 November 1894 – 1975) was a Red Army Major General of Justice and a member of the Military Collegium of the Supreme Court of the USSR. He served as the Judge of the Soviet Union on the International Military Tribunal for the Far East.

== Biography ==
Zaryanov was born on 26 November 1894 in the village of Rodinskaya, Slobodskoy Uyezd, Vyatka Governorate, today part of Kirov Oblast. He was conscripted into the army in January, 1915. From 1918 to 1920, he was part of the military tribunal of the Vyatka Governorate. He then became the president of the military court of the 29th Infantry Brigade. In 1927, he graduated from the Law Faculty of the Central Asian State University. From 1931 to 1934, he studied at the Institute of Red Professors. Upon his graduation, he became a member of the Military Collegium of the Supreme Court of the USSR. Zaryanov sat on show trials against Trotskyites and Bukharinites in 1935 and 1938. In 1941, he was the president of the military courts of the Eastern Front. From 1942 to 1945, he was also the head of the Red Army Military Law Academy.

By the end of the war, he was a Major General of the Red Army and Major General of Justice in the Red Army Military Law Academy. In 1946, he was appointed as the Justice of the Soviet Union on the International Military Tribunal for the Far East. Zaryanov did not speak English nor Japanese, the two official languages of the trial, and he was allowed to bring his 60-year old interpreter Mrs. Bernstein.

In 1955, he was expelled from the Communist Party and stripped of his ranks. He died in 1975.

== Awards ==
The following lists awards and decorations of Zaryanov:

- Order of the Red Star (20 August 1937)
- Order of the Red Banner (11 March 1944)
- Medal "For the Defence of Moscow" (1 May 1944)
- Order of Lenin (30 April 1945)
- Medal "For the Victory over Germany in the Great Patriotic War 1941–1945" (19 July 1945)
