= Tulipani, Love, Honour and a Bicycle =

2017 film

- Film poster
- Directed by: Mike van Diem
- Written by: Peter van Wijk
- Produced by: Hans de Weers; Elwin Looije; Don Carmody; David Cormican; Corrado Azzollini; Claudio Bucci; Kestutis Drazdauskas
- Starring: Ksenia Solo; Gijs Naber; Lidia Vitale; Donatella Finocchiaro; Giorgio Pasotti; Giancarlo Giannini
- Cinematography: Luc Brefeld; Lennert Hillege
- Edited by: Jessica de Koning
- Music by: Ari Posner; Jim McGrath
- Production companies: FATT Productions; Don Carmody Television; Draka Production; Stemo Production
- Distributed by: Atlas International Film
- Release date: 21 September 2017
- Running time: 90 minutes
- Countries: Netherlands; Canada; Italy
- Languages: Dutch; English; Italian
- Box office: $611,347

Tulipani, Love, Honour and a Bicycle (Dutch: Tulipani, Liefde, Eer en een Fiets, Italian: Tulipani, Amore, Onore e una Bicicletta) is a 2017 Dutch comedy film, written by Peter van Wijk and directed by Mike van Diem. It was shortlisted by the EYE Film Institute Netherlands as one of the eight films to be selected as the potential Dutch submission for the Academy Award for Best Foreign Language Film at the 90th Academy Awards. However, it was not selected, with Layla M. being chosen as the Dutch entry.

== Plot ==
After losing his farm during the North Sea flood of 1953, Dutch farmer Gauke takes his bicycle and begins a long journey to the warm Apulia region, where he intends to grow tulips. Arriving in a small, torrid village, the man begins his new life and an extraordinary flower business, becoming a sort of legend for the locals. When Gauke suddenly disappears, it is a real tragedy for the villagers. Thirty years later, the young Canadian Anna arrives in the same village, having come there to scatter the ashes of her deceased Italian mother. Believed by everyone to be the daughter of the legendary Gauke, the girl is welcomed by the locals as one of them. Perhaps thanks to her, police inspector Catarella will finally be able to solve the mystery surrounding the Dutchman's disappearance.

== Cast ==
- Ksenia Solo as Anna
- Giancarlo Giannini as Catarella
- Gijs Naber as Gauke
- Lidia Vitale as Immacolata
- Donatella Finocchiaro as Chiara
- Giorgio Pasotti as Piero

== Production ==
The film was shot between Apulia and Basilicata in the cities of Bari, Ruvo, Ginosa, Giovinazzo, Gravina, Montescaglioso and Matera.
