= International Military Tribunal for the Far East =

Post–World War II war crimes trials

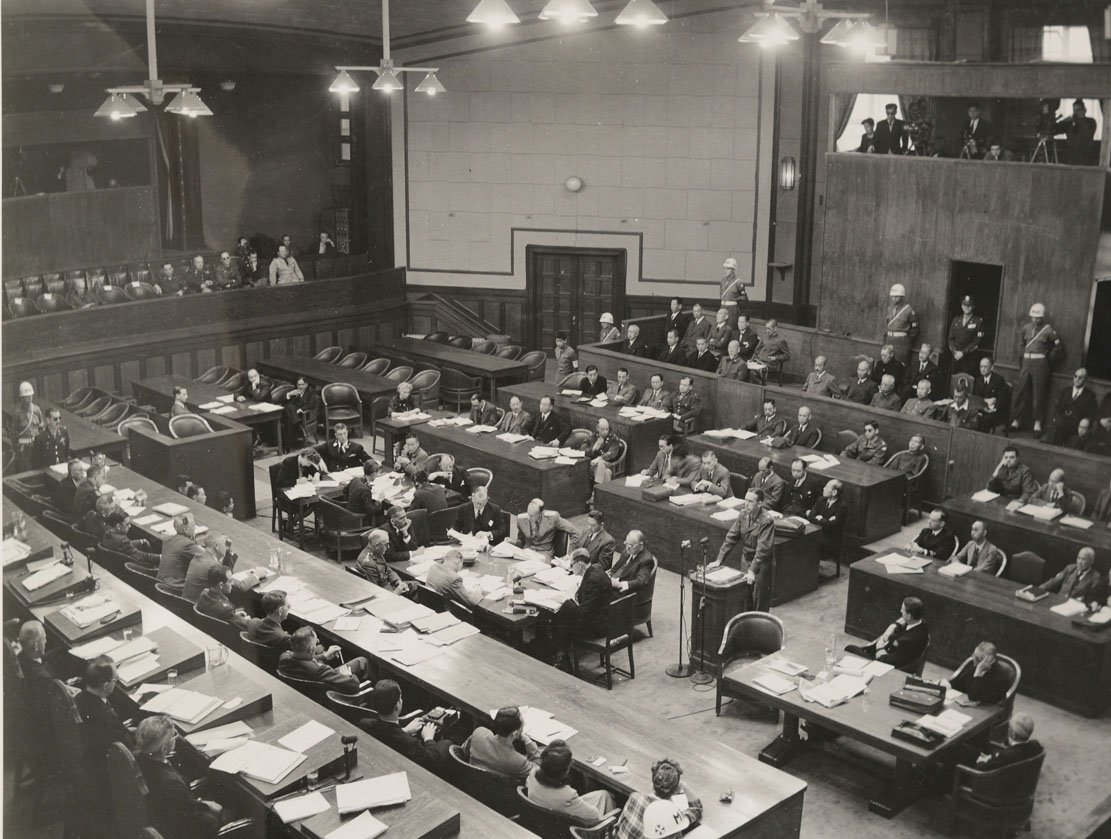
- Court chamber during the tribunal in Ichigaya, Tokyo
- Indictment: Conspiracy, crimes against peace, war crimes, crimes against humanity
- Started: April 29, 1946
- Decided: November 12, 1948
- Defendant: 28 (see list)

Case history
- Related action: Nuremberg trials

Court membership
- Judge sitting: 11 (see list)

The International Military Tribunal for the Far East (IMTFE), also known as the Tokyo Trial and the Tokyo War Crimes Tribunal, was a military trial convened on April 29, 1946, to try leaders of the Empire of Japan for their crimes against peace, conventional war crimes, and crimes against humanity, leading up to and during World War II. The IMTFE was modeled after the International Military Tribunal (IMT) at Nuremberg, Germany, which prosecuted the leaders of Nazi Germany for their war crimes, crimes against peace, and crimes against humanity.

Following Japan's defeat and occupation by the Allies, the Supreme Commander for the Allied Powers, United States General Douglas MacArthur, issued a special proclamation establishing the IMTFE. A charter was drafted to establish the court's composition, jurisdiction, and procedures; the crimes were defined based on the Nuremberg Charter. The Tokyo War Crimes Tribunal was composed of judges, prosecutors, and staff from eleven countries that had fought against Japan: Australia, Canada, China, France, India, the Netherlands, New Zealand, the Philippines, the Soviet Union, the United Kingdom, and the United States; the defense consisted of Japanese and American lawyers. The Tokyo Trial exercised broader temporal jurisdiction than its counterpart in Nuremberg, beginning from the 1931 Japanese invasion of Manchuria.

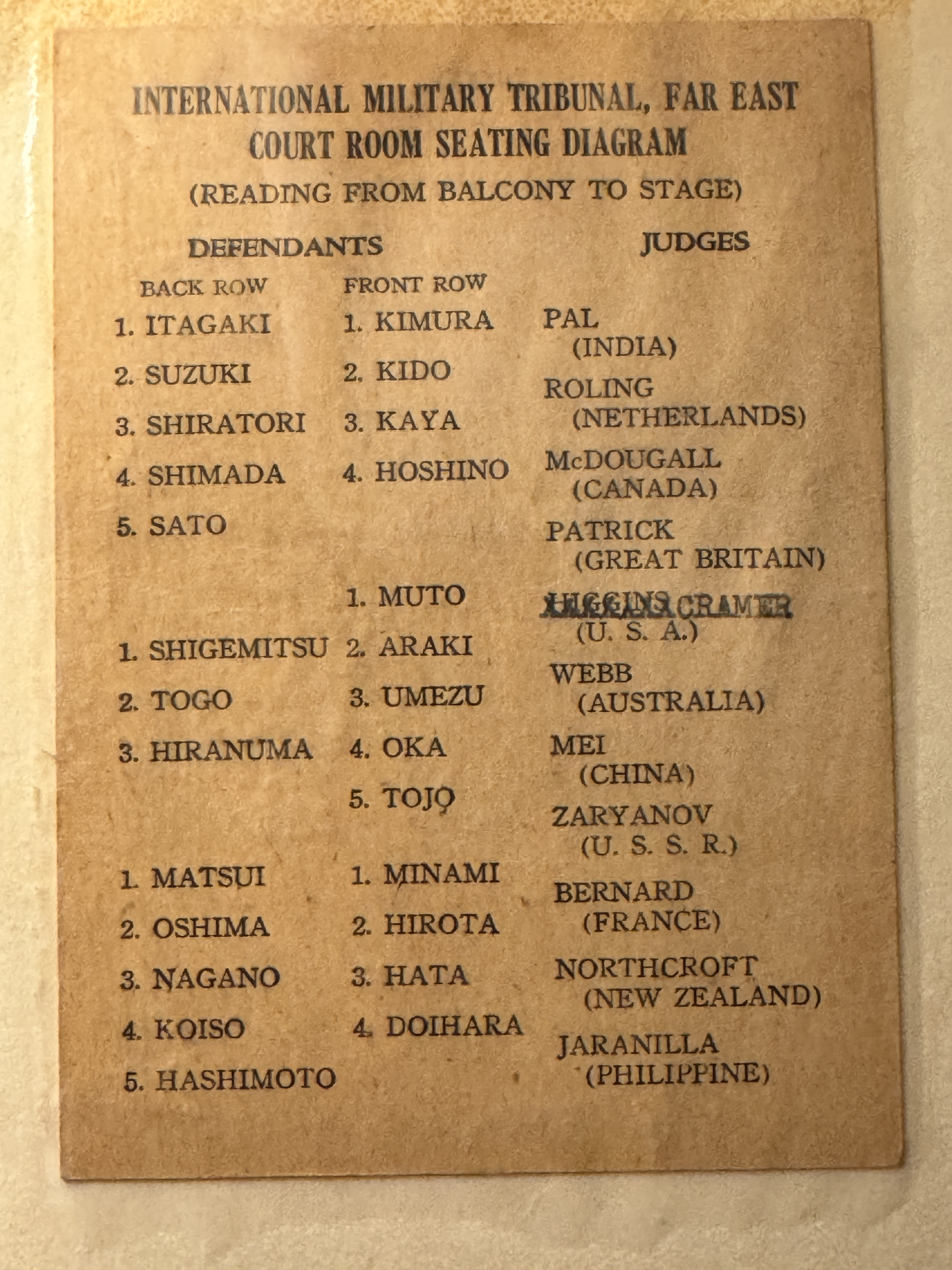
International Military Tribunal, Far East; Courtroom Seating Diagram

Twenty-eight high-ranking Japanese military and political leaders were tried by the court, including prime ministers, cabinet members, and military commanders. They were charged with 55 separate counts, including the waging wars of aggression, murder, and various war crimes and crimes against humanity (such as torture and forced labor) against prisoners-of-war, civilian internees, and the inhabitants of occupied territories of the Japanese colonial empire; ultimately, 45 of the counts, including all the murder charges, were ruled either redundant or not authorized under the IMTFE Charter. The Tokyo Trial lasted more than twice as long as the better-known Nuremberg trials, and its impact was similarly influential in the development of international law; international war crimes tribunals would not again be established until the International Criminal Tribunal for the former Yugoslavia in 1993 and the International Criminal Tribunal for Rwanda in 1994.

By the time it adjourned on November 12, 1948, two defendants had died of natural causes and one, Shūmei Ōkawa, was ruled unfit to stand trial. All remaining defendants were found guilty of at least one count. Seven were sentenced to death: Kenji Doihara, Kōki Hirota, Seishirō Itagaki, Heitarō Kimura, Akira Mutō, Hideki Tojo, and Iwane Matsui. Another sixteen were sentenced to life imprisonment, during which three died and the remaining thirteen were paroled between 1952 and 1958. Another 42 suspects, including Nobusuke Kishi and Yoshisuke Aikawa, were imprisoned awaiting an unrealized second trial, and released in 1947 and 1948.

Across Asia and the Pacific, domestic tribunals were held in Allied nations, with most concluding by 1949. These indicted a further 5,700 Japanese personnel, of whom 984 were sentenced to death.

The trials were criticized on a range of issues. The U.S. occupation decided that Emperor Hirohito, and other members of the Imperial House, would not be prosecuted, called to testify, or incriminated by other evidence. Defendants were allowed to coordinate their stories to this end. Strategic bombing by Japan and crimes against its own citizens, including Koreans and Taiwanese, were not prosecuted. Some of the trial's judges and defense lawyers argued this was connected to the lack of prosecution of Allied strategic bombing in Asia, including the atomic bombings of Hiroshima and Nagasaki, and of Western imperialism in Asia. Due to a U.S. cover-up, Japanese leaders and scientists involved in its biological warfare against China and forced human experimentation, including Unit 731, were given immunity in exchange for assisting the United States biological weapons program. Some of these leaders were convicted by the 1949 Soviet Khabarovsk war crimes trials.

== Background ==
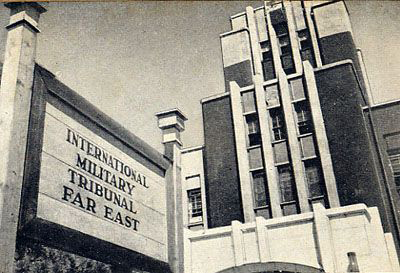
The International Military Tribunal for the Far East was convened at Ichigaya Court, formerly the Imperial Japanese Army H building, in Ichigaya, Tokyo.

The Tribunal was established to implement the Cairo Declaration, the Potsdam Declaration, the Instrument of Surrender, and the Moscow Conference. The Potsdam Declaration (July 1945) had stated, "stern justice shall be meted out to all war criminals, including those who have visited cruelties upon our prisoners," though it did not specifically foreshadow trials. The terms of reference for the Tribunal were set out in the IMTFE Charter, issued on January 19, 1946. There was major disagreement, both among the Allies and within their administrations, about whom to try and how to try them. Despite the lack of consensus, General Douglas MacArthur, the Supreme Commander of the Allied Powers, decided to initiate arrests. On September 11, a week after the surrender, he ordered the arrest of 39 suspects—most of them members of Hideki Tojo's war cabinet, but only 28 were tried either due to lack of evidence, illness, or death. Tojo tried to commit suicide but was resuscitated with the help of U.S. physicians.

== Creation of the court ==
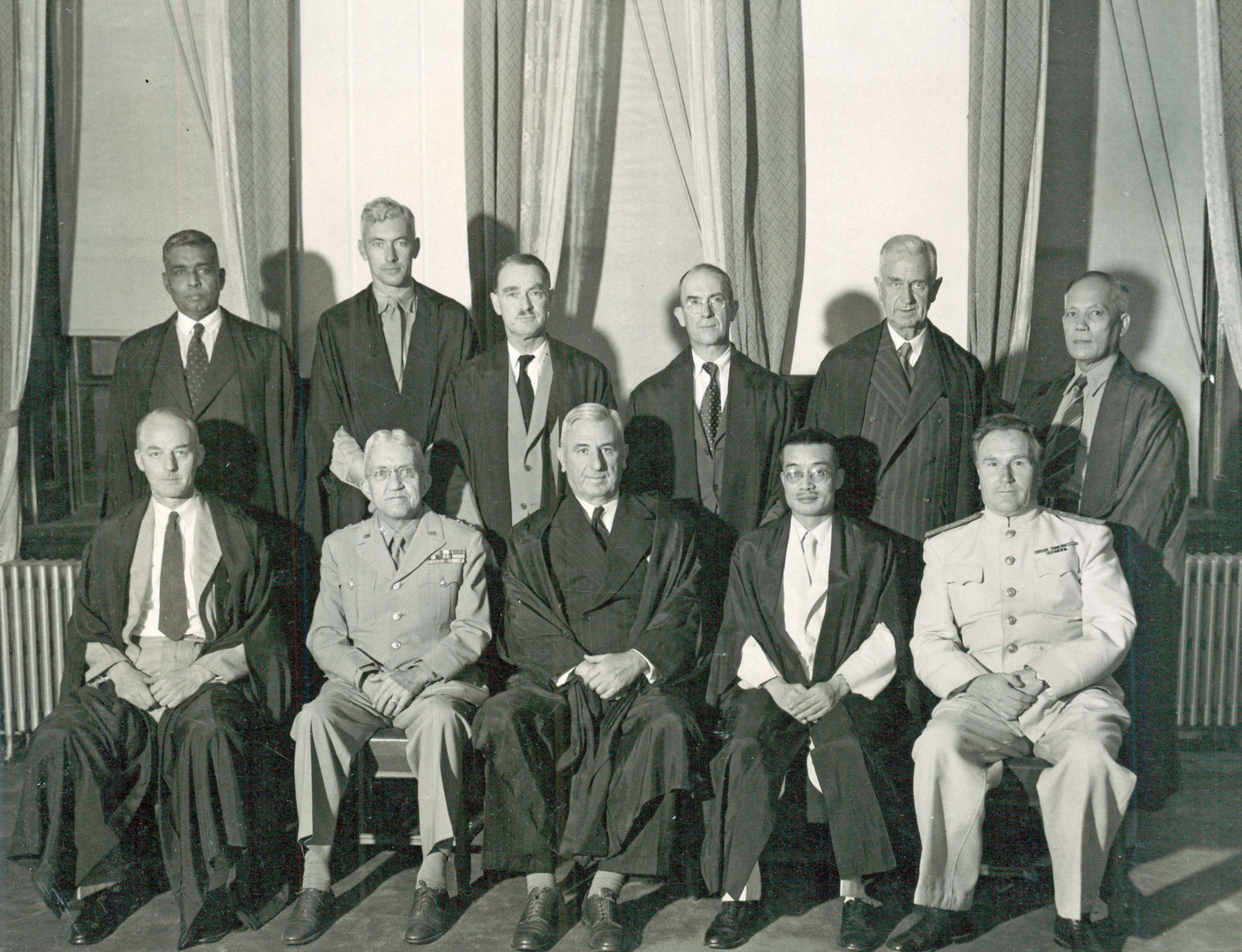
The judges (July 29, 1946)

On January 19, 1946, MacArthur issued a special proclamation ordering the establishment of an International Military Tribunal for the Far East (IMTFE). On the same day, he also approved the Charter of the International Military Tribunal for the Far East (CIMTFE), which prescribed how it was to be formed, the crimes that it was to consider, and how the tribunal was to function. The charter generally followed the model set by the Nuremberg trials. On April 25, in accordance with the provisions of Article 7 of the CIMTFE, the original Rules of Procedure of the International Military Tribunal for the Far East with amendments were promulgated.

== Tokyo War Crimes Trial ==
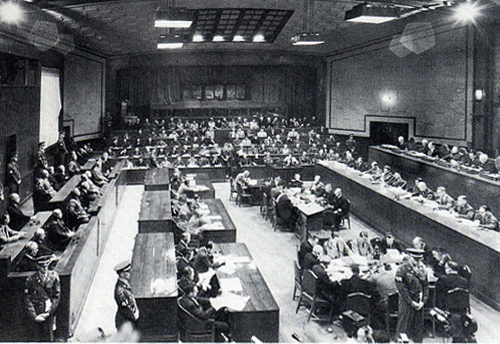
View of the Tribunal in session: the bench of judges is on the right, the defendants on the left, and the prosecutors in the back

Following months of preparation, the IMTFE convened on April 29, 1946. The trials were held in the War Ministry office in Tokyo.

On May 3 the prosecution opened its case, charging the defendants with crimes against peace, conventional war crimes, and crimes against humanity. The trial continued for more than two and a half years, hearing testimony from 419 witnesses and admitting 4,336 exhibits of evidence, including depositions and affidavits from 779 other individuals.

=== Charges ===
Following the model used at the Nuremberg trials in Germany, the Allies established three broad categories:

- "Class A" charges covered crimes against peace, that is, waging a war of aggression against other nations, and only applied to Japan's top leaders who had planned and directed the war. The tribunal only had jurisdiction over those charged with Class A crimes.
- "Class B" charges covered conventional war crimes, that is, violations of the laws of war in which only enemy and neutral nationals can be the principal victims, such as the Rape of Nanjing, the attack on the neutral U.S. at Pearl Harbor without warning, or the Bataan Death March.
- "Class C" charges covered crimes against humanity, that is, systematic violence, deportation, or enslavement of any civilian population in time of peace or war, or persecutions on political or racial grounds in the execution of or in connection with any foregoing crimes. This category was created mainly to address atrocities committed by a state against its own nationals or allied citizens. This class of charges might have been applied to Japan's use of Korean and Taiwanese subjects as forced laborers and comfort women. In the end, however, crimes against colonial subjects went unaddressed at the trials.

The indictment accused the defendants of promoting a scheme of conquest that:

[C]ontemplated and carried out ... murdering, maiming and ill-treating prisoners of war (and) civilian internees ... forcing them to labor under inhumane conditions ... plundering public and private property, wantonly destroying cities, towns and villages beyond any justification of military necessity; (perpetrating) mass murder, rape, pillage, brigandage, torture and other barbaric cruelties upon the helpless civilian population of the over-run countries.

The chief prosecutor, Joseph B. Keenan, issued a press statement along with the indictment: "War and treaty-breakers should be stripped of the glamour of national heroes and exposed as what they really are—plain, ordinary murderers."

Count	Offense
1	As leaders, organizers, instigators, or accomplices in the formulation or execution of a common plan or conspiracy to wage wars of aggression, and war or wars in violation of international law
27	Waging unprovoked war against China
29	Waging aggressive war against the United States
31	Waging aggressive war against the British Commonwealth (Crown colonies and protectorates of the United Kingdom in the Far East and South Asia, Australia and New Zealand)
32	Waging aggressive war against the Netherlands (Dutch East Indies)
33	Waging aggressive war against France (French Indochina)
35, 36	Waging aggressive war against the USSR
54	Ordered, authorized, and permitted inhumane treatment of prisoners of war and others
55	Deliberately and recklessly disregarded their duty to take adequate steps to prevent atrocities

=== Evidence and testimony ===
The prosecution began opening statements on May 3, 1946, and took 192 days to present its case, finishing on January 24, 1947. It submitted its evidence in fifteen phases.

The prosecution team relied on the doctrine of command responsibility, which obviated the need to prove the various alleged atrocities were the result of the defendants' illegal orders. The prosecution instead had to prove three things: that war crimes were systematic or widespread; the accused knew that troops were committing atrocities; and the accused had power or authority to stop the crimes.

Evidentiary standards were low, and, according to Article 13 of the Charter, it was not to be "bound by technical rules of evidence ... and shall admit any evidence which it deems to have probative value", including documents such as diaries or letters which lacked "proof of its issuance or signature". One example of evidence used by prosecution to argue that a conspiracy had existed was the Tanaka Memorial, a document purportedly from 1927 that laid out the Japanese government's plans to conquer the world. The memorial was later revealed to be a hoax of Chinese origin, but its validity was not widely doubted at the time. Conversely, the defense was expected to adhere to the best evidence rule. Any possible evidence that would incriminate Emperor Hirohito and his family was excluded from the International Military Tribunal for the Far East, as the United States believed it needed him to maintain order in Japan and achieve their postwar objectives.

=== Defense ===
The defendants were represented by over a hundred attorneys, three-quarters of them Japanese and one-quarter American, plus a support staff. The defense opened its case on January 27, 1947, and finished its presentation 225 days later on September 9, 1947.

The defense argued that the trial could never be free from substantial doubt as to its "legality, fairness and impartiality" and also that the laws they were accused of violating had not yet been established at the time of the actual acts. Similarly, they argued that, as individuals, they could not be held accountable for acts committed by the state, and that they could not be tried for not preventing others from committing war crimes.

The defense argued that Allied Powers' violations of international law should be examined.

During the trial, Shigenori Tōgō continued to say that Japan had acted in self-defense and been forced into the war by the Hull note, saying that "we felt at the time that Japan was being driven either to war or suicide".

=== Judgment ===
After the defense had finished its presentation on September 9, 1947, the IMTFE spent fifteen months reaching judgement and drafting its 1,781-page opinion. The reading of the judgement and the sentences lasted from November 4 to 12, 1948. Five of the eleven justices released separate opinions outside the court.

In his concurring opinion Australian justice William Webb took issue with Emperor Hirohito's legal status, writing, "The suggestion that the Emperor was bound to act on advice is contrary to the evidence." While refraining from personal indictment of Hirohito, Webb indicated that Hirohito bore responsibility as a constitutional monarch who accepted "ministerial and other advice for war" and that "no ruler can commit the crime of launching aggressive war and then validly claim to be excused for doing so because his life would otherwise have been in danger ... It will remain that the men who advised the commission of a crime, if it be one, are in no worse position than the man who directs the crime be committed."

Justice Delfín Jaranilla of the Philippines disagreed with the penalties imposed by the tribunal as being "too lenient, not exemplary and deterrent, and not commensurate with the gravity of the offence or offences committed."

Justice Henri Bernard of France argued that the tribunal's course of action was flawed due to Hirohito's absence and the lack of sufficient deliberation by the judges. He concluded that Japan's declaration of war "had a principal author who escaped all prosecution and of whom in any case the present Defendants could only be considered as accomplices" and that a "verdict reached by a Tribunal after a defective procedure cannot be a valid one."

"It is well-nigh impossible to define the concept of initiating or waging a war of aggression both accurately and comprehensively," wrote Justice Bert Röling of the Netherlands in his dissent. He stated, "I think that not only should there have been neutrals in the court, but there should have been Japanese also." He argued that they would always have been a minority and therefore would not have been able to sway the balance of the trial. However, "they could have convincingly argued issues of government policy which were unfamiliar to the Allied justices." Pointing out the difficulties and limitations in holding individuals responsible for an act of state and making omission of responsibility a crime, Röling called for the acquittal of several defendants, including Hirota.

Justice Radhabinod Pal of India produced a judgment in which he dismissed the legitimacy of the IMTFE as victor's justice: "I would hold that each and every one of the accused must be found not guilty of each and every one of the charges in the indictment and should be acquitted on all those charges." While taking into account the influence of wartime propaganda, exaggerations, and distortions of facts in the evidence, and "over-zealous" and "hostile" witnesses, Pal concluded, "The evidence is still overwhelming that atrocities were perpetrated by the members of the Japanese armed forces against the civilian population of some of the territories occupied by them as also against the prisoners of war."

=== Sentencing ===
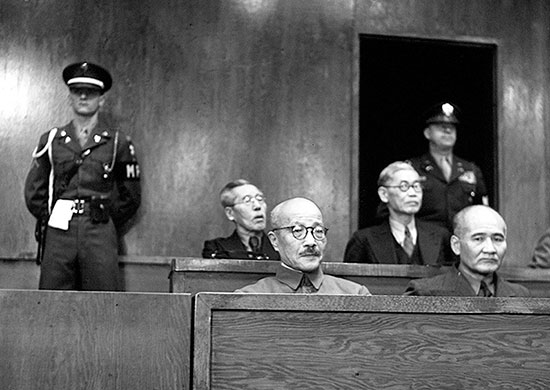
Defendants at the International Military Tribunal for the Far East: (front row, left to right) Prime Minister Hideki Tojo, Admiral Oka Takazumi, (back row, left to right) Chairman of the Privy Council Kiichirō Hiranuma, Foreign Minister Shigenori Tōgō

One defendant, Shūmei Ōkawa, was found mentally unfit for trial and the charges were dropped.

Two defendants, Yōsuke Matsuoka and Osami Nagano, died of natural causes during the trial.

Six defendants were sentenced to death by hanging for war crimes, crimes against humanity, and crimes against peace (Class A, Class B and Class C):

- General Kenji Doihara, chief of the intelligence services in Manchukuo
- Kōki Hirota, former prime minister (later foreign minister)
- General Seishirō Itagaki, war minister
- General Heitarō Kimura, commander, Burma Area Army
- Lieutenant General Akira Mutō, chief of staff, 14th Area Army
- General Hideki Tojo, commander, Kwantung Army (later prime minister)

One defendant was sentenced to death by hanging for war crimes and crimes against humanity (Class B and Class C):

- General Iwane Matsui, commander, Shanghai Expeditionary Force and Central China Area Army

On November 24, 1948, two days after a meeting with the Allied Control Commission for Japan, MacArthur confirmed the verdict and sentences.

The seven defendants who were sentenced to death were executed at Sugamo Prison in Ikebukuro on December 23, 1948. MacArthur, afraid of embarrassing and antagonizing the Japanese people, defied the wishes of President Truman and barred photography of any kind, instead bringing in four members of the Allied Council to act as official witnesses.

Sixteen defendants were sentenced to life imprisonment. Three (Koiso, Shiratori, and Umezu) died in prison, while the other thirteen were paroled between 1952 and 1958:

- General Sadao Araki, war minister
- Colonel Kingoro Hashimoto, major instigator of the second Sino-Japanese War
- Field Marshal Shunroku Hata, war minister
- Baron Kiichirō Hiranuma, prime minister
- Naoki Hoshino, Chief Cabinet Secretary
- Okinori Kaya, Minister of Finance
- Marquis Kōichi Kido, Lord Keeper of the Privy Seal
- General Kuniaki Koiso, governor-general of Korea, later prime minister
- General Jirō Minami, commander, Kwantung Army, former governor-general of Korea
- Vice Admiral Takazumi Oka, chief of the Naval Affairs Bureau
- Lieutenant General Hiroshi Ōshima, Ambassador to Germany
- Lieutenant General Kenryō Satō chief of the Military Affairs Bureau
- Admiral Shigetarō Shimada, naval minister and Chief of the Navy General Staff
- Toshio Shiratori, Ambassador to Italy
- Lieutenant General Teiichi Suzuki, president of the Cabinet Planning Board
- General Yoshijirō Umezu, war minister and Chief of the Army General Staff
- Foreign minister Shigenori Tōgō was sentenced to 20 years' imprisonment. Togo died in prison in 1950.
- Foreign minister Mamoru Shigemitsu was sentenced to 7 years and paroled in 1950. He later served as Foreign Minister and as Deputy Prime Minister of post-war Japan under Prime Minister Ichiro Hatoyama.

== Other war crimes trials ==
More than 5,700 lower-ranking personnel were charged with conventional war crimes in separate trials convened by Australia, China, France, the Dutch East Indies, the Philippines, the United Kingdom, and the United States. The charges covered a wide range of crimes including prisoner abuse, rape, sexual slavery, torture, ill-treatment of laborers, execution without trial, and inhumane medical experiments. The trials took place in around fifty locations in Asia and the Pacific. Most trials were completed by 1949, but Australia held some trials in 1951. China held 13 tribunals, resulting in 504 convictions and 149 executions. Of the 5,700 Japanese individuals indicted for Class B war crimes, 984 were sentenced to death; 475 received life sentences; 2,944 were given more limited prison terms; 1,018 were acquitted; and 279 were never brought to trial or not sentenced.

The Soviet Union and Chinese Communist forces also held trials of Japanese war criminals. The Khabarovsk War Crime Trials held by the Soviets tried and found guilty some members of Japan's bacteriological and chemical warfare unit, also known as Unit 731. However, those who surrendered to the Americans were never brought to trial. As Supreme Commander for the Allied Powers, MacArthur gave immunity to Shirō Ishii and all members of the bacteriological research units in exchange for germ warfare data based on human experimentation. On May 6, 1947, he wrote to Washington that "additional data, possibly some statements from Ishii probably can be obtained by informing Japanese involved that information will be retained in intelligence channels and will not be employed as 'War Crimes' evidence." The deal was concluded in 1948.

== Criticism ==
=== Charges of victors' justice ===
The United States had provided the funds and staff necessary for running the Tribunal and also held the function of Chief Prosecutor. The argument was made that it was difficult, if not impossible, to uphold the requirement of impartiality with which such an organ should be invested. This apparent conflict gave the impression that the tribunal was no more than a means for the dispensation of victors' justice. Solis Horowitz argues that IMTFE had an American bias: unlike the Nuremberg trials, there was only a single prosecution team, led by an American, although the members of the tribunal represented eleven different Allied countries. The IMTFE had less official support than the Nuremberg trials. Keenan, a former U.S. assistant attorney general, had a much lower position than Nuremberg's Robert H. Jackson, a justice of the U.S. Supreme Court.

Justice Jaranilla had been captured by the Japanese and survived the Bataan Death March and the Manila massacre. The defense sought to remove him from the bench claiming he would be unable to maintain objectivity. The request was rejected but Jaranilla did excuse himself from presentation of evidence for atrocities in his native country of the Philippines.

Justice Radhabinod Pal argued that the exclusion of Western colonialism and the atomic bombings of Hiroshima and Nagasaki from the list of crimes and the lack of judges from the vanquished nations on the bench signified the "failure of the Tribunal to provide anything other than the opportunity for the victors to retaliate". In this he was not alone among Indian jurists, with one prominent [Kolkata] barrister writing that the Tribunal was little more than "a sword in a [judge's] wig."

Justice Röling stated, "[o]f course, in Japan we were all aware of the bombings and the burnings of Tokyo and Yokohama and other big cities. It was horrible that we went there for the purpose of vindicating the laws of war, and yet saw every day how the Allies had violated them dreadfully."

However, in respect to Pal and Röling's statement about the conduct of air attacks, there was no positive or specific customary international humanitarian law with respect to aerial warfare before and during World War II. Ben Bruce Blakeney, an American defense counsel for Japanese defendants, argued that "[i]f the killing of Admiral Kidd by the bombing of Pearl Harbor is murder, we know the name of the very man who[se] hands loosed the atomic bomb on Hiroshima," although Pearl Harbor was classified as a war crime under the 1907 Hague Convention, as it happened without a declaration of war and without a just cause for self-defense.

Similarly, the indiscriminate bombing of Chinese cities by Japanese Imperial forces was never raised in the Tokyo Trials in fear of the United States being accused of the same thing for its air attacks on Japanese cities. As a result, Japanese pilots and officers were not prosecuted for their aerial raids on Pearl Harbor and cities in China and other Asian countries.

=== Pal's dissenting opinion ===
Indian jurist Radhabinod Pal raised substantive objections in a dissenting opinion: he found the entire prosecution case to be weak regarding the conspiracy to commit an act of aggressive war, which would include the brutalization and subjugation of conquered nations. About the Nanking Massacre—while acknowledging the brutality of the incident—he said that there was nothing to show that it was the "product of government policy" or that Japanese government officials were directly responsible. There is "no evidence, testimonial or circumstantial, concomitant, prospectant, restrospectant, that would in any way lead to the inference that the government in any way permitted the commission of such offences," he said. In any case, he added, conspiracy to wage aggressive war was not illegal in 1937, or at any point since. In addition, Pal thought the refusal to try what he perceived as Allied crimes (particularly the use of atomic bombs) weakened the tribunal's authority. Recalling a letter by Kaiser Wilhelm II signalling his determination to bring World War I to a swift conclusion through brutal means if necessary, Pal stated that "This policy of indiscriminate murder to shorten the war was considered to be a crime. In the Pacific war under our consideration, if there was anything approaching what is indicated in the above letter of the German Emperor, it is the decision coming from the Allied powers to use the bomb", adding that "Future generations will judge this dire decision". Pal was the only judge to argue for the acquittal of all of the defendants.

=== Exoneration of the Imperial Family ===
Emperor Hirohito and other members of the Imperial Family might have been regarded as potential suspects. They included career officer Prince Yasuhiko Asaka, Prince Fushimi Hiroyasu, Prince Naruhiko Higashikuni, and Prince Tsuneyoshi Takeda. Herbert P. Bix explained, "The Truman's administration and General MacArthur both believed the occupation reforms would be implemented smoothly if they used Hirohito to legitimise their changes."

As early as November 26, 1945, MacArthur confirmed to Admiral Mitsumasa Yonai that the Emperor's abdication would not be necessary. Before the war crimes trials actually convened, the Supreme Commander for the Allied Powers (SCAP), the International Prosecution Section (IPS), and court officials worked behind the scenes not only to prevent the imperial family from being indicted, but also to skew the testimony of the defendants to ensure that no one implicated the Emperor. High officials in court circles and the Japanese government collaborated with Allied GHQ in compiling lists of prospective war criminals. People arrested as Class A suspects and incarcerated in the Sugamo Prison solemnly vowed to protect their sovereign against any possible taint of war responsibility.

According to Bix, Brigadier General Bonner Fellers "immediately on landing in Japan went to work to protect Hirohito from the role he had played during and at the end of the war" and "allowed the major criminal suspects to coordinate their stories so that the emperor would be spared from indictment."

Bix also argues that "MacArthur's truly extraordinary measures to save Hirohito from trial as a war criminal had a lasting and profoundly distorting impact on Japanese understanding of the lost war" and "months before the Tokyo tribunal commenced, MacArthur's highest subordinates were working to attribute ultimate responsibility for Pearl Harbor to General Hideki Tojo." According to a written report by Shūichi Mizota, Admiral Mitsumasa Yonai's interpreter, Fellers met the two men at his office on March 6, 1946, and told Yonai, "It would be most convenient if the Japanese side could prove to us that the emperor is completely blameless. I think the forthcoming trials offer the best opportunity to do that. Tōjō, in particular, should be made to bear all responsibility at this trial."

Historian John W. Dower wrote that the campaign to absolve Emperor Hirohito of responsibility "knew no bounds." He argued that with MacArthur's full approval, the prosecution effectively acted as "a defense team for the emperor," who was presented as "an almost saintly figure" let alone someone culpable of war crimes. He stated, "Even Japanese activists who endorse the ideals of the Nuremberg and Tokyo charters and who have labored to document and publicize the atrocities of the Shōwa regime cannot defend the American decision to exonerate the emperor of war responsibility and then, in the chill of the Cold War, release and soon afterwards openly embrace accused right-winged war criminals like the later prime minister Nobusuke Kishi."

Three justices wrote an obiter dictum about the criminal responsibility of Hirohito. Judge-in-Chief Webb declared, "No ruler can commit the crime of launching aggressive war and then validly claim to be excused for doing so because his life would otherwise have been in danger ... It will remain that the men who advised the commission of a crime, if it be one, are in no worse position than the man who directs the crime be committed."

Justice Henri Bernard of France concluded that Japan's declaration of war "had a principal author who escaped all prosecution and of whom in any case the present Defendants could only be considered as accomplices."

Justice Röling did not find the emperor's immunity objectionable and further argued that five defendants (Kido, Hata, Hirota, Shigemitsu, and Tōgō) should have been acquitted.

=== Failure to prosecute perpetrators of inhumane medical experimentation ===
Shirō Ishii, commander of Unit 731, received immunity in exchange for data gathered from his experiments on live prisoners. In 1981 John W. Powell published an article in the Bulletin of the Atomic Scientists detailing the experiments of Unit 731 and its open-air tests of germ warfare on civilians. It was printed with a statement by Judge Röling, the last surviving member of the Tokyo Tribunal, who wrote, "As one of the judges in the International Military Tribunal, it is a bitter experience for me to be informed now that centrally ordered Japanese war criminality of the most disgusting kind was kept secret from the Court by the U.S. government".

=== Failure to prosecute other suspects ===
Forty-two suspects, such as Nobusuke Kishi, who later became Prime Minister, and Yoshisuke Aikawa, head of Nissan, were imprisoned in the expectation that they would be prosecuted at a second Tokyo Tribunal but they were never charged. They were released in 1947 and 1948.

=== Failure to prosecute Japan's atrocities against its nationals as crimes against humanity ===
Despite Class C charges being created to prosecute Japan for atrocities against its nationals, this never occurred at all. Britain, France, Netherlands, and the U.S.—four-nation members of the Tokyo trials—had colonies themselves and feared that their own colonial atrocities might be brought to account for crimes against humanity. As a consequence, this left the Korean and Taiwanese victims of Japanese colonial atrocities without any recourse in the international legal system.

== Aftermath ==
=== Release of the remaining 42 "Class A" suspects ===
The International Prosecution Section (IPS) of the SCAP decided to try the 70 Japanese apprehended for "Class A" war crimes in three groups. The first group (28 people) were major leaders in the military, political, and diplomatic sphere. The second group (23 people) and the third group (19 people) were industrial and financial magnates who had been engaged in weapons manufacturing industries or were accused of trafficking in narcotics, as well as a number of lesser known leaders in military, political, and diplomatic spheres. The most notable among these were:

- Nobusuke Kishi: In charge of industry and commerce of Manchukuo, 1936–1940; Minister of Industry and Commerce under Tojo administration.
- Fusanosuke Kuhara: Leader of the pro-Zaibatsu faction of Rikken Seiyukai.
- Yoshisuke Aikawa: Sworn brother of Fusanosuke Kuhara, founder of Japan Industrial Corporation; went to Manchuria after the Mukden Incident (1931), at the invitation of his relative Nobusuke Kishi, where he founded the Manchurian Heavy Industry Development Company.
- Toshizō Nishio: Chief of Staff of the Kwantung Army, Commander-in-Chief of China Expeditionary Army, 1939–41; war-time Minister of Education.
- Kisaburō Andō: Garrison Commander of Port Arthur and Minister of Interior in the Tojo cabinet.
- Yoshio Kodama: A radical ultranationalist. War profiteer, smuggler and underground crime boss.
- Ryōichi Sasakawa: Ultranationalist businessman and philanthropist.
- Kazuo Aoki: Administrator of Manchurian affairs; Minister of Treasury in Nobuyoki Abe's cabinet; followed Abe to China as an advisor; Minister of Greater East Asia in the Tojo cabinet.
- Masayuki Tani: Ambassador to Manchukuo, Minister of Foreign Affairs and concurrently Director of the Intelligence Bureau; Ambassador to the Reorganized National Government of China.
- Eiji Amo: Chief of the Intelligence Section of Ministry of Foreign Affairs; Deputy Minister of Foreign Affairs; Director of Intelligence Bureau in the Tojo cabinet.
- Yakichiro Suma: Consul General at Nanking; in 1938, he served as counselor at the Japanese Embassy in Washington; after 1941, Minister Plenipotentiary to Spain.

All remaining people apprehended and accused of Class A war crimes who had not yet come to trial were set free by MacArthur in 1947 and 1948.

=== San Francisco Peace Treaty ===
Under Article 11 of the San Francisco Peace Treaty, signed on September 8, 1951, Japan accepted the jurisdiction of the International Military Tribunal for the Far East. Article 11 of the treaty reads:

Japan accepts the judgments of the International Military Tribunal for the Far East and of other Allied War Crimes Courts both within and outside Japan, and will carry out the sentences imposed thereby upon Japanese nationals imprisoned in Japan. The power to grant clemency, reduce sentences and parole with respect to such prisoners may not be exercised except on the decision of the government or governments which imposed the sentence in each instance, and on the recommendation of Japan. In the case of persons sentenced by the International Military Tribunal for the Far East, such power may not be exercised except on the decision of a majority of the governments represented on the Tribunal, and on the recommendation of Japan.

=== Parole for war criminals movement ===
In the late 1940s and 1950s, a move to provide amnesty for lesser war criminals began in both Japan and Germany. In Japan, public sympathy was directed toward Class B and C criminals and there was domestic sentiment that the Japanese people were really victims in the whole affair and that the leaders bore most of the responsibility. Sugamo Prison was renamed to the Sugamo Detention Centre, and members of the public visited it to provide friendship and entertainment for those imprisoned there. A 1950 directive signed by MacArthur granted those convicted of life sentences the ability to be paroled after fifteen years, and additionally reduced sentences to two-thirds of their original time for good behaviour. A 1952 campaign to release the prisoners was supported by ten million people and, in 1955, a survey by the Japanese government showed that nearly two-thirds of the respondents disapproved of the Tokyo Trials. The war criminals themselves had also begun advocating for their own release.

On September 4, 1952, President Truman issued Executive Order 10393, establishing a Clemency and Parole Board for War Criminals. Its purpose was to "make the necessary investigation in, and advise the President" in matters relating to the "clemency, reduction of sentence, or parole" of those convicted by the International Military Tribunal for the Far East or other war tribunals created by the American government when such a decision was "required on recommendation by the Government of Japan".

On May 26, 1954, Secretary of State John Foster Dulles rejected a proposed amnesty for the imprisoned war criminals but instead agreed to "change the ground rules" by reducing the period required for eligibility for parole from 15 years to 10 years. That year, Kingoro Hashimoto, Shunroku Hata, Jirō Minami, and Oka Takazumi were paroled, followed in 1955 by Sadao Araki, Hiranuma Kiichirō, Naoki Hoshino, Okinori Kaya, Kōichi Kido, Hiroshi Ōshima, Shigetarō Shimada, and Teiichi Suzuki. Kenryō Satō, the last of Class A criminals, was released in March 1956. On April 7, 1957, the Japanese government publicly gave clemency to all convicted during the tribunals.

== Legacy ==
In 1978, the kami of 1,068 convicted war criminals, including the kami of 14 convicted Class-A war criminals, including Hideki Tōjō, Kenji Doihara, Iwane Matsui, Heitarō Kimura, Kōki Hirota, Seishirō Itagaki, Akira Mutō, Yosuke Matsuoka, Osami Nagano, Toshio Shiratori, Kiichirō Hiranuma, Kuniaki Koiso, and Yoshijirō Umezu, were secretly enshrined in the Yasukuni Shrine. The decision to enshrine the Class A criminals made the shrine controversial, and it has been a point of contention in the diplomatic relationships between China, South Korea, and Japan.

Arnold Brackman, who had covered the trials for United Press International, wrote The Other Nuremberg: The Untold Story of the Tokyo War Crimes Trial, a rebuttal of charges that the trial had been "victor's justice"; this rebuttal was posthumously published in 1987, four years after Arnold Brackman's death.

In a survey of 3,000 Japanese people which was conducted by Asahi News as the 60th anniversary of the start of the trial approached in 2006, 70% of those who were questioned were unaware of the details of the trial, a figure that rose to 90% among those who were in the 20–29 age group. Some 76% of those polled agreed that the Japanese war effort was entirely or partially aggressive, while 7% believed that the war was waged for self-defense. A 45% plurality characterized the war as motivated by some mix of aggression and self-defense.

A South Korean government commission cleared 83 of the 148 Koreans who were convicted of war crimes by the Allies. The commission ruled that the Koreans, who were categorized as Class B and Class C war criminals, were actually victims of Japanese imperialism.

=== Potential concerns expressed by the Japanese Imperial Family ===
In February 2015, Crown Prince Naruhito (who would later be crowned emperor himself in 2019) expressed concern about how Japan's history and involvement in World War II would be remembered by the Japanese population. Naruhito stated that it was "important to look back on the past humbly and correctly", in reference to Japan's role in World War II-era war crimes; he further argued that there was an ongoing need to "correctly pass down tragic experiences and the history behind Japan to the generations who have no direct knowledge of the war, at the time memories of the war are about to fade."

== List of judges, prosecutors, and defendants ==
=== Judges ===
MacArthur appointed a panel of 11 judges, nine from the nations that signed the Instrument of Surrender.

Judge	Background	Country	Opinion
Sir William Webb	Justice of the High Court of Australia; President of the Tribunal	Australia	Separate
Edward Stuart McDougall	Justice of the Court of King's Bench of Quebec	Canada	
Mei Ju-ao	Member of the Legislative Yuan	China	
Henri Bernard	Avocat-General at Bangui; Chief Prosecutor of the First Military Tribunal in Paris	France	Dissenting
Radhabinod Pal	Judge of the Calcutta High Court	India	Dissenting
Professor Bert Röling	Professor of Law at Utrecht University	Netherlands	Dissenting
Erima Harvey Northcroft	Judge of the Supreme Court of New Zealand; former Judge Advocate-General of the New Zealand Army	New Zealand	
Colonel Delfin Jaranilla	Attorney General of the Philippines; Associate Justice of the Supreme Court of the Philippines	Philippines	Separate
The Honourable Lord Patrick	Senator of the College of Justice, Scotland	United Kingdom	
John P. Higgins	Chief Justice of the Massachusetts Superior Court; replaced by Major General Myron C. Cramer upon resignation.	United States	
Major General Myron C. Cramer	Judge Advocate General of the United States Army; replaced Judge Higgins in July 1946	United States	
Major-General I. M. Zaryanov	Member of the Military Collegium of the Supreme Court of the USSR	USSR	

Legal scholar Roscoe Pound was also apparently favourably disposed to replacing John P. Higgins as a judge, but his appointment did not eventuate.

=== Prosecutors ===
The chief prosecutor, Joseph B. Keenan of the United States, was appointed by President Harry S. Truman.

Prosecutor	Background
Joseph B. Keenan	Assistant Attorney General of the United States; Director of the Criminal Division of the Department of Justice of the United States
Mr. Justice Alan Mansfield	Senior Puisne Judge of the Supreme Court of Queensland
Brigadier Henry Nolan	Vice-Judge Advocate General of the Canadian Army
Hsiang Che-chun	Minister of Justice and Foreign Affairs
Robert L. Oneto	Prosecutor of the Provisional Government of the French Republic
P. Govinda Menon	Crown Prosecutor and Judge, Supreme Court of India
W.G. Frederick Borgerhoff-Mulder	Associate Prosecutor of the Netherlands
Brigadier Ronald Henry Quilliam	Deputy Adjutant-General of the New Zealand Army
Pedro Lopez	Associate Prosecutor of the Philippines
Arthur Strettell Comyns Carr	British MP and Barrister
Minister and Judge Sergei Alexandrovich Golunsky	Head of the Legal Department of the Ministry of Foreign Affairs of the Soviet Union

=== Defendants ===
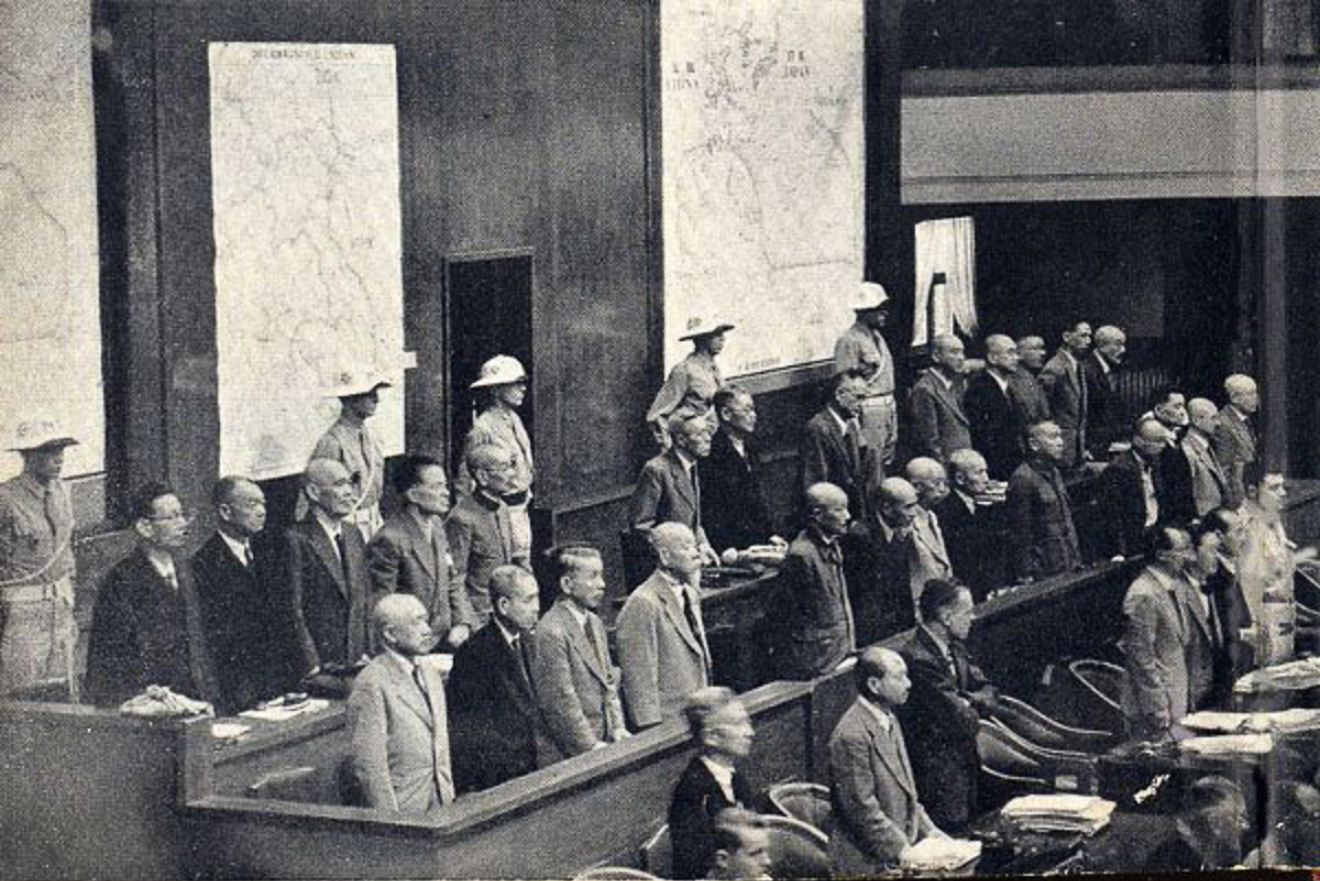
The defendants

Twenty-eight defendants were charged, mostly military officers and government officials.

==== Civilian officials ====
- Kōki Hirota, prime minister (1936–37), foreign minister (1933–1936, 1937–38)
- Hiranuma Kiichirō, prime minister (1939), president of the privy council
- Naoki Hoshino, chief cabinet secretary
- Kōichi Kido, Lord Keeper of the Privy Seal
- Toshio Shiratori, Ambassador to Italy
- Shigenori Tōgō, foreign minister (1941–42, 1945)
- Mamoru Shigemitsu, foreign minister (1943–1945)
- Okinori Kaya, finance minister (1941–1944)
- Yōsuke Matsuoka, foreign minister (1940–41)

==== Military officers ====
- General Hideki Tojo, prime minister (1941–1944), war minister (1940–1944), chief of the Imperial Japanese Army General Staff Office (1944)
- General Sadao Araki, war minister (1931–34)
- General Kenji Doihara, chief of the intelligence service in Manchukuo
- Colonel Kingoro Hashimoto, founder of Sakurakai
- Field Marshal Shunroku Hata, war minister (1939–40)
- General Seishirō Itagaki, war minister (1938–39)
- General Heitarō Kimura, commander of the Burma Area Army
- General Kuniaki Koiso, prime minister (1944–45), governor-general of Korea (1942–44)
- General Iwane Matsui, commander of the Shanghai Expeditionary Force and Central China Area Army
- General Jirō Minami, governor-general of Korea (1936–1942)
- Lieutenant General Akira Mutō, chief of staff of the 14th Area Army
- Fleet Admiral Osami Nagano, navy minister (1936–37), chief of the Imperial Japanese Navy General Staff (1941–1944)
- Vice Admiral Takazumi Oka, chief of the Bureau of Naval Affairs
- Lieutenant General Hiroshi Ōshima, ambassador to Germany
- Lieutenant General Kenryō Satō, chief of the Military Affairs Bureau
- Admiral Shigetarō Shimada, navy minister (1941–1944), chief of the Imperial Japanese Navy General Staff (1944)
- Lieutenant General Teiichi Suzuki, chief of the Cabinet Planning Board
- General Yoshijirō Umezu, commander of the Kwantung Army, chief of the Imperial Japanese Army General Staff Office (1944–45)

==== Other defendants ====
- Shūmei Ōkawa, a political philosopher and ideologue

== See also ==
- Allied war crimes during World War II
- Bangka Island massacre
- Bataan Death March
- Comfort women
- Indian National Army trials
- Japanese war crimes
- Justice Erima Harvey Northcroft Tokyo War Crimes Trial Collection
- Khabarovsk war crimes trials
- Manila massacre
- Nanjing Massacre
- Nanjing War Crimes Tribunal
- Nanking: A 2007 Chinese film about the Nanjing Massacre.
- The Rape of Nanking (book): a book about the Nanjing Massacre which was written by Iris Chang, the book was published in the United States by Basic Books in 1997, the sixtieth anniversary of the start of the Nanjing Massacre
- Philippine War Crimes Commission
- Sugamo Prison
- Unit 731
- Yokohama War Crimes Trials
- プライド運命の瞬間 ("Praido", Pride): A 1998 Japanese film about the trial.
- The Tokyo Trial: A 2006 Chinese film about the trial.
- Tokyo Trial: a 2016 miniseries
- Post-World War II Romanian war crime trials
