= 13 Eerie =

2013 Canadian film

- Theatrical released poster
- Directed by: Lowell Dean
- Written by: Christian Piers Betley
- Produced by: Don Carmody; Kevin DeWalt; Mark Montague; David Cormican
- Starring: Katharine Isabelle; Michael Shanks; Brendan Fehr; Brendan Fletcher; Nick Moran; Jesse Moss
- Cinematography: Mark Dobrescu
- Edited by: Jacqueline Carmody
- Music by: Igor Vrabac; Ken Worth
- Production companies: Don Carmody Productions; Minds Eye Entertainment
- Distributed by: Entertainment One
- Release dates: March 29, 2013 (France); April 2, 2013 (United States)
- Running time: 87 minutes
- Country: Canada
- Language: English
- Budget: $3 million
- Box office: $21.2 million

13 Eerie is a 2013 Canadian horror film directed by Lowell Dean, making his feature film debut. It is also produced by Don Carmody, Kevin DeWalt, Mark Montague and David Cormican and written by Christian Piers Betley. The film stars Katharine Isabelle, Michael Shanks, Brendan Fehr, Brendan Fletcher, Nick Moran and Jesse Moss. It entails the story about six forensic undergrads completing a university field exam on a deserted island, oblivious that the island was previously used for illegal biological experiments on life-term prisoners.

== Plot ==
Six forensic undergrads, Megan (Katharine Isabelle), Daniel (Brendan Fehr), Josh (Brendan Fletcher), Patrick (Jesse Moss), Kate (Kristie Patterson) and Rob (Michael Eisner), are assigned to complete a scientific field exam on a deserted island known as Eerie Strait, where life-term prisoners were once held and corpses lay dead. With cameras set up, Professor Tomkins (Michael Shanks) dispatches them into pairs to examine corpses in different areas as part of staged murders, restricting the pairs from interacting, only allowing their use of walkie talkies to report back to him. Unfortunately these have been accidentally damaged. He also monitors their activities from a surveillance cabin.

Shortly, Larry (Nick Moran), an ex-con who transported the group, warns partners, Megan and Kate, about finding the unexpected corpse of a skinhead female in a jumpsuit which soon comes alive in their working area. Rob spots the zombie in the woods and tries to warn his partner, Daniel, who dismisses it. Due to the earlier damage, all of the walkie talkies lose battery life, and communication is broken. While in the woods alone, the zombie pursues Kate and cannibalizes parts of her. Josh and Patrick hear her screams and see a figure's movements in the woods, suspecting there is a problem.

As Larry tries to inform an initially skeptical Tomkins, who is upset with Larry for inadvertently destroying much of the equipment, Megan finds Kate injured, carrying her back to the student cabin before she dies. Rob, believing something is up, leaves Daniel to go out on his own. As Kate revives as a zombie and Rob approaches her as one after being bitten to death by the tattoo zombie (Ryland Alexander) and thug zombie (Jason Truong), Megan is forced to gruesomely kill the two of them. The remaining crew splits up and searches for the missing others, and Daniel finds Megan. Back at the main cabin, as the zombies attack, Tomkins shoots the skinhead zombie that is outside and inside where Larry botches a molotov cocktail, the thug zombie is able to pull Larry underneath the cabin to bite him to death.

Tomkins tells Megan and Daniel to hide in a school bus. Chased by the zombies, Josh and Patrick seek safety in a prison bus, honking the horn that alerts the others to their location. Leaving the school bus, Megan and Daniel see zombie Larry coming after them. Megan accidentally fires a shot that injures Daniel, but she shoots Larry dead. They are found and they join Josh and Patrick on the prison bus. The zombies attack the bus, and they crash the tattoo zombie into a nearby cabin, resulting in Patrick's death. The thug zombie comes after them and it is shot down. They drive away, but the bus starts to smoke and it tips over a branch and crashes, though Megan, Daniel and Josh, who sustains a knee injury, all survive. Not long after, the tattoo zombie catches up to them and Megan shoots it, but runs out of bullets. As she is about to be bitten, Josh saves her, driving an arrow through the zombie's head.

The next day Tomkins finds them. Captain Veneziano (Lyndon Bray) drives by and they have him pull over. Megan, Daniel and Josh get into the car as Tomkins attacks Veneziano, who is pressured to admit the island was used for conducting biological experiments on prisoners sentenced to death row and turned into a death camp when the testing went wrong years ago. The tattoo zombie approaches from behind and Tomkins sacrifices Veneziano to save his own life. He attempts to drive off with his students, only to realize the keys are clenched between the teeth of the zombie. The final scene shows Megan, Daniel, Josh and Tomkins looking terrified about their fates.

== Cast ==
- Katharine Isabelle as Megan
- Michael Shanks as Professor Tomkins
- Brendan Fehr as Daniel
- Brendan Fletcher as Josh
- Nick Moran as Larry Jefferson
- Jesse Moss as Patrick
- Kristie Patterson as Kate
- Michael Eisner as Rob
- Lyndon Bray as Captain Veneziano
- Ryland Alexander as Tattoo Zombie
- Shannon Jardine as Skinhead Nazi Zombie
- Jason Truong as Thug Zombie

== Production ==
The film is a Canadian production produced by Don Carmody Productions and Minds Eye Entertainment.

== Release ==
13 Eerie was released on home video April 2, 2013.

== Reception ==
Generally, critical reception for 13 Eerie were mixed to negative.

DVD Verdict stated that the film "13 Eerie is a respectable entry into the zombie genre. If you find this one in the discount bin, snatch it up". On an opposite perspective, DVD Talk stated that "An unusual setup isn't enough to save 13 Eerie from falling into the pit of clichés created by its zombie and slasher forefathers. Once you get past the idea of watching something truly novel and settle in for another helping of the usual, you'll find a competently staged and acted production."
