= Between (TV series) =

Canadian science fiction drama television series

- Genre: Science fiction; Teen drama
- Created by: Michael McGowan
- Starring: Jennette McCurdy; Jesse Carere; Ryan Allen; Justin Kelly; Kyle Mac; Jack Murray; Brooke Palsson; Stephen Bogaert; Samantha Munro; Rick Roberts; Steven Grayhm; Percy Hynes White; Mercedes Morris; Shailyn Pierre-Dixon; Jordan Todosey
- Country of origin: Canada
- Original language: English
- No. of seasons: 2
- No. of episodes: 12

Production
- Executive producers: Michael McGowan; Don Carmody; David Cormican; Naveen Prasad
- Running time: 45 minutes
- Production companies: Don Carmody Television; Mulmur Feed Co.; Elevation Pictures

Original release
- Network: City (Canada); Netflix (international)
- Release: May 21, 2015 – August 4, 2016

Between is a Canadian science fiction drama television series which debuted on Citytv on May 21, 2015. Created by Michael McGowan, the series stars Jennette McCurdy as Wiley Day, a pregnant teenage daughter of a minister living in the small town of Pretty Lake, which is coping with a mysterious disease that has killed everybody age 22 and older.

The series is a co-production between Citytv and Netflix, which distributes the series outside Canada as a Netflix Original Series. The series was renewed for a second season on July 8, 2015, which premiered on June 30, 2016. Though the series was never officially cancelled, no news has been released about the series since the last episode of the second season aired on August 4, 2016.

== Plot ==
Between is the story of a small town called Pretty Lake and surrounding rural area under siege from a mysterious disease that has wiped out everybody aged 22 and older. The series also explores numerous themes: the power vacuum that results when the government quarantines a 10 square mile zone and leaves the inhabitants to fend for themselves; the desire of inhabitants to escape, ignoring that they will spread the deadly disease to the entire planet; and the effect of hormonal teenaged/young adult angst becoming the guiding force for an entire community.

Charles "Chuck" Lott is an entitled kid from a rich family who had been on the school hockey team, and assumes the role of a leader among the survivors, including several of his siblings. Their father, Charles Lott Sr., was the town's wealthiest person, owning half the town. Having died after the first episode, he is seen as a corpse in the second.

== Cast and characters ==
=== Main ===
- Jennette McCurdy as Wiley Day
- Jesse Carere as Adam Jones
- Ryan Allen as Gord
- Justin Kelly as Chuck Lott Jr.
- Kyle Mac as Ronnie Creeker
- Jack Murray as Mark
- Brooke Palsson as Melissa Day (season 1)
- Stephen Bogaert as Charles Lott Sr., Chuck's father (season 1)
- Samantha Munro as Stacey
- Rick Roberts as Clarence Jones, Adam's father (season 1)
- Steven Grayhm as Liam Cullen (season 2)
- Percy Hynes White as Harrison (guest season 1, main season 2)
- Mercedes Morris as Renee Tofoli (season 2)
- Shailyn Pierre-Dixon as Frances (recurring season 1, main season 2)
- Jordan Todosey as Tracey Creeker (recurring season 1, main season 2)
- Rosemary Dunsmore as Minister Miller (recurring season 1, main season 2)
- Pascal Langdale as Dexter Crane (season 2)

=== Recurring ===
- Krystal Nausbaum as Amanda Lott (season 1)
- Niamh Wilson as Lana Lott (season 1)
- Shailene Garnett as Ms. Amy Symonds (season 1)
- Jim Watson as Pat Creeker
- Lucius Hoyos as McCalister
- Abigail Winter as Samantha
- Jesse Bostick as Felix
- Wesley Morgan as Kevin (season 1)
- Canute Gomes as Vince (season 1)
- Sarah Podemski as Ellen (season 1)
- Rebecca Liddiard as Hanna
- Ian Fisher as John
- Leanne Miller as Helen (season 2)
- Alexander de Jordy as Lamar (season 2)
- Drew Davis as Eric Tofoli (season 2)

== Episodes ==
Season	Episodes	Originally released	
Season	Episodes	First released	Last released
1	6	May 21, 2015	June 25, 2015
2	6	June 30, 2016	August 4, 2016

=== Season 1 (2015) ===
No. overall	No. in season	Title	Directed by	Written by	Original release date	Prod. code
1	1	"School's Out"	Jon Cassar	Michael McGowan	May 21, 2015	101
An outbreak of unexplained illness arises in the small town of Pretty Lake and leads to the death all people age 22 and older. The government puts the city in quarantine to prevent the disease from spreading. Locked, the people who are still alive try to find a way out and an explanation for these deaths while dealing with personal problems.
2	2	"Who's the Boss"	Jon Cassar	Peter Mitchell	May 28, 2015	102
The government orders the survivors in Pretty Lake to burn the bodies of their loved ones who died of the viral outbreak, after which they will lift the quarantine. Wiley faints and is taken to the fire pit of bodies. Adam thinks that a scientist named Art Carey has something to do with these unexplained deaths. Chuck's sister Amanda accidentally sets fire to the supermarket containing the town's major food supply, and blames it on Ronnie.
3	3	"Crossing Lines"	Jon Cassar	Malcolm Macrury	June 4, 2015	103
The government maintains the quarantine, and restricts airspace over Pretty Lake. Frannie is in danger on the farm when a tiger breaks loose from the local zoo. Chuck accuses Ronnie of murdering his sister Lana, and Gord is shot trying to help. Power goes down and Wiley and Adam think it's the perfect time to try to escape.
4	4	"Love Hurts"	Michael McGowan	Story by : Michael McGowan; Teleplay by : Michael McGowan & Blain Watters	June 11, 2015	104
Ms. Amy Symonds, who turns 22, fears she may be the next victim of the virus; Chuck punishes a kid who wrecks a car; Melissa searches for Wiley and her baby. Ronnie exaggerates the drugs and tries to do something to shock everyone.
5	5	"End of the Rope"	Michael McGowan	Story by : Mark Bacci; Teleplay by : Michael McGowan & Blain Watters	June 18, 2015	105
Ellen interrogates Adam about remaining residents in Pretty Lake; Chuck's friend collapses and needs to get out of the quarantine zone. Wiley and Pat make an irreversible mistake.
6	6	"War"	Michael McGowan	Story by : Michael McGowan & Ellen Vanstone; Teleplay by : Michael McGowan & Blain Watters	June 25, 2015	106
Adam thinks he may have found a way out of Pretty Lake: Chuck and the Creekers agree to a ceasefire, but it will require Ronnie to make a sacrifice. Melissa convinces Wiley to reveal who is the father of her child.

=== Season 2 (2016) ===
No. overall	No. in season	Title	Directed by	Written by	Original release date	Netflix release date	Prod. code
7	1	"Get Out of Town"	Richard Bota	Sam Egan	June 30, 2016	July 1, 2016	201
After four weeks stuck in quarantine, Pretty Lake residents are already running out of food and the despair to escape becomes the highest priority among them.
8	2	"Us vs. Them"	Richard Bota	Sam Egan	July 7, 2016	July 1, 2016	202
After a tragic accident, Chuck returns to Pretty Lake. A strange scientist enters Pretty Lake claiming to have a cure and the hope and distrust resurge among the youngers.
9	3	"Hope"	Richard Bota	Sam Egan	July 14, 2016	July 1, 2016	203
Ronnie discovers an abandoned place where a group of survivors led by Renee tries to live day after day. Wiley has to make a choice that could change her life. Adam and Chuck go in search of answers.
10	4	"Extraction"	Michael McGowan	Robert King	July 21, 2016	July 1, 2016	204
Wiley and Liam seek someone about to turn 22 years to test the cure. Frannie and Harrison begin a search for answers. The reign of Renee in The Horde may be at stake.
11	5	"Horatio Rising"	Michael McGowan	Sandra Chwialkowska	July 28, 2016	July 1, 2016	205
Adam gets what he wanted and risks everything in a plan that may cost the lives of everyone in Pretty Lake. Wiley takes the lead within the fence. Minister Miller orders total extermination of the inhabitants of the town.
12	6	"Don't Look Back"	Michael McGowan	Sandra Chwialkowska	August 4, 2016	July 1, 2016	206
Adam continues trying to get out all the vaccinated citizens of Pretty Lake before the extermination authorized by Minister Miller. Wiley failed negotiations with Renee, which could cost Mark's life.

== Production ==
The series was originally set for a season of six one-hour episodes, co-produced and financed by Citytv and Netflix as part of a collaboration deal. The series represents the first major television solo starring role for McCurdy.

Production of season 1 began on October 20, 2014. Citytv aired an exclusive preview of the series during their broadcast of the 57th Annual Grammy Awards, and the series premiered on May 21, 2015.

Jesse Carere was promoted to managing director for season 2. Production of season 2 began in January 2016, with six one-hour episodes like the first season. The series shot through March 11, 2016, with two new characters, Liam (played by Steven Grayhm) and Renee (played by Mercedes Morris).

=== Web series ===
==== Between the Lines ====
As an accompaniment to the show, a web series called Between the Lines has been released, featuring eight two-minute webisodes. The web series follows the character Amanda as she interviews students at Pretty Lake High as an assignment for the school's yearbook. The series begins pre-outbreak, and continues throughout the quarantine and ensuing chaos, taking an in-depth look at a different character each week. The first installment of the web series was posted on May 22, 2015, with new webisodes made available every week on CityTV.com, after each TV episode broadcasts. The season 2 edition of the web series, a six-part video diary kept by Wiley and Adam, became available on June 23, 2016.

==== Inside Between ====
In addition, season 2 includes an after-show web component called Inside Between, hosted by Angelina LeDrew-Bonvarlez and Nicole Stamp and streaming live (then remaining available) on CityTV.com's Between page, directly following each TV episode's initial broadcast on City.

== Broadcast ==
Per the collaboration deal, the series airs terrestrially on City, and streams on Shomi in Canada and Netflix internationally. It is the first series originating from Canada to air on Netflix from its inception.

Episodes aired on a week by week basis on City, on Thursdays at 8 pm Eastern Time. During season 1, they were later added on week by week basis on Netflix, for international viewing at 11:30 pm Eastern. Season 1 was added to Netflix's Canadian service one year after its Shomi debut. For season 2, all six episodes were released on Netflix on July 1, 2016, outside Canada.

=== Ratings ===
Between's season 1 ratings on Citytv pulled a combined 3.2 million viewers, reaching roughly 10% of the Canadian population. The show performed at 31% in the desirable 18–34 age demographic, significantly above the channel average of 19% for the demographic.

== Reception ==
Rotten Tomatoes reports a 22% approval rating with an average rating of 4.3/10, based on 18 critic reviews. The website's critics consensus reads, "A poorly acted regurgitation of post-apocalyptic cliches, Between falls short of Netflix's other high quality offerings." On the review aggregator Metacritic, the series has a weighted average score of 47 out of 100 based on 10 critics, indicating "mixed or average".

Brian Lowry of Variety called Between "an utterly ho-hum addition to Netflix's original lineup". Keith Uhlich of The Hollywood Reporter wrote, "It's the end of the world as they know it, and viewers won't care." Mike Hale of The New York Times called it a "familiar ensemble soap opera with conspiracy-theory embroidery". Mary McNamara of the Los Angeles Times wrote, "The town is lovely, the premise solid if overfamiliar, but the script lacks both depth and tension (big problem), and McCurdy is one of the few cast members who can act." Kevin P. Sullivan of Entertainment Weekly rated it C− and criticized the show's writing. Joshua Alston of The A.V. Club rated it C+ and wrote that the series lacks a compelling hook.

== See also ==
- The Girl Who Owned a City (1975), novel detailing a pandemic which killed off anyone over the age of 12
- Empty World (1977), novel where a plague kills off all the adults
- The Tribe (1999 TV series), television series where the adult population has been wiped out by a deadly virus and the kids become warring tribes
- Jeremiah (TV series), television series where the adult population has been wiped out by a deadly virus
- Gone (novel series) (2008), novel series where anyone over the age of 15 disappears mysteriously
- The Sparticle Mystery (2011), television series detailing an experiment that made anyone over the age of 15 disappear mysteriously
- The Society (TV series) (2019), television series where only a group of teenagers remain after their entire town disappears mysteriously
