= The Secret Life of Marilyn Monroe =

2015 American television drama miniseries

- Genre: Drama; Biopic
- Based on: The Secret Life of Marilyn Monroe by J. Randy Taraborrelli
- Teleplay by: Stephen Kronish
- Directed by: Laurie Collyer
- Starring: Kelli Garner; Susan Sarandon; Emily Watson; Jeffrey Dean Morgan
- Composer: David Carbonara
- Country of origin: United States
- Original language: English
- No. of episodes: 2

Production
- Executive producers: Stephen Kronish; Damien Ganczewski; Keri Selig; Jonathan Koch; Steven Michaels
- Producers: Joseph Boccia; Don Carmody; David Cormican
- Production locations: Ontario, Canada
- Cinematography: Christopher Manley
- Editors: Ron Wisman; Ron Wisman Jr.
- Running time: 84 minutes
- Production companies: Intuition Productions; Asylum Entertainment

Original release
- Network: Lifetime
- Release: May 30 – May 31, 2015

The Secret Life of Marilyn Monroe is a 2015 American biographical drama miniseries on Marilyn Monroe. It stars Kelli Garner, Susan Sarandon, Emily Watson, Jeffrey Dean Morgan, and Eva Amurri Martino and was first aired on Lifetime on May 30 and 31, 2015. The (two-hour forty-seven minute) miniseries is based on The New York Times bestseller of the same name by J. Randy Taraborrelli. It was nominated for three Creative Arts Emmy Awards.

== Plot ==
A chronicle of Marilyn Monroe's family life, her relationship with her mother, Gladys Pearl Baker, and how she succeeded in hiding her most intimate secrets from the press and an invasive world.

== Cast ==
=== Main characters ===
- Kelli Garner as Marilyn Monroe
- Susan Sarandon as Gladys Pearl Baker, Marilyn's mother
- Emily Watson as Grace McKee, Marilyn's foster mother, later called "aunt"
- Jack Noseworthy as Alan DeShields, Marilyn's therapist
- Giacomo Gianniotti as Jimmy Dougherty, Marilyn's first husband
- Jeffrey Dean Morgan as Joe DiMaggio, Marilyn's second husband
- Stephen Bogaert as Arthur Miller, Marilyn's third husband
- Matthew Bennett as Whitey, Marilyn's makeup artist
- Embeth Davidtz as Natasha Lytess, Marilyn's acting coach
- Peter MacNeill as Mr. Schenck, Chairman of Fox Studios
- Tony Nardi as Johnny Hyde, Marilyn's agent
- Barry Flatman as Mr. Zanuck, Studio Head of 20th Century Fox
- Angela Vint as Patricia Newcomb, Marilyn's publicist
- Tamara Hickey as Patricia Kennedy Lawford

=== Supporting characters ===
- Eva Amurri Martino as young Gladys Pearl Baker
- Gloria Gruber as Ida Bolender, Marilyn's caretaker as a child, also called "aunt"
- Vickie Papavs as Mrs. Murray, Marilyn's housekeeper
- Morgan Kelly as Tom Kelly, photographer
- Michael Rash as Billy Wilder, Marilyn's director
- Norm Owen as Richard Sherman
- Neil Crone as Don Lyon
- Jeff Kassel as Dr. Ennis, Gladys' doctor
- Sarah Booth as Mrs. Kelly
- Carolina Bartczak as Phyllis
- Lindsay G Merrithew as the Beverly Hill Physician
- Ella Allan as young Marilyn Monroe (Norma Jeane)
- Mia Allan as young Marilyn Monroe (Norma Jeane)

== Reception ==
=== Critical reception ===
The Secret Life of Marilyn Monroe garnered mixed reviews. Keith Ulrich of The Hollywood Reporter writes, "There's little that's surprising or inspired in Lifetime's two-part miniseries about iconic Hollywood celebrity Marilyn Monroe." While, Brian Lowry of Variety writes, "What sets this latest rehash of the star's existence apart, marginally, is a knockout performance by Kelli Garner and, to a lesser degree, Susan Sarandon's turn as her mentally disturbed mother." A positive review by Jordan Appugliesi of US Weekly states, "Surprise! It's Actually Good." On Rotten Tomatoes the series has an approval of 55% based on 11 reviews with an average rating of 6/10. The site's critical consensus reads, "Offering few revelations, The Secret Life of Marilyn Monroe treads the same well-worn path as many other Monroe biopics, despite an admirable performance by Kelli Garner". On Metacritic, the series has a score of 55 out of 100 based on 12 critics, indicating "mixed or average".

=== Accolades ===
Association	Category	Recipient	Result	Ref
Creative Arts Emmy Awards	Outstanding Cinematography for a Limited Series or Movie	Chris Manley	Nominated	
Creative Arts Emmy Awards	Outstanding Hairstyling for a Limited Series or a Movie	Cliona Furey; Cathy Shibley; Jacqueline Robertson Cull; Vincent Sullivan	Nominated	
Creative Arts Emmy Awards	Outstanding Makeup for a Limited Series or a Movie (Non-Prosthetic)	Jordan Samuel; Patricia Keighran; Susan Reilly LeHane	Nominated	
Directors Guild of America	Outstanding Directorial Achievement in Movies for Television and Miniseries	Laurie Collyer	Nominated	
Online Film & Television Association Awards	Best Actress in a Motion Picture or Miniseries	Kelli Garner	Nominated	
Prism Awards	Best Actress in a Motion Picture or Miniseries	Kelli Garner	Nominated	
Screen Actors Guild Awards	Outstanding Performance by a Female Actor in a Television Movie or Miniseries	Susan Sarandon	Nominated	
