= Don Carmody =

American film producer

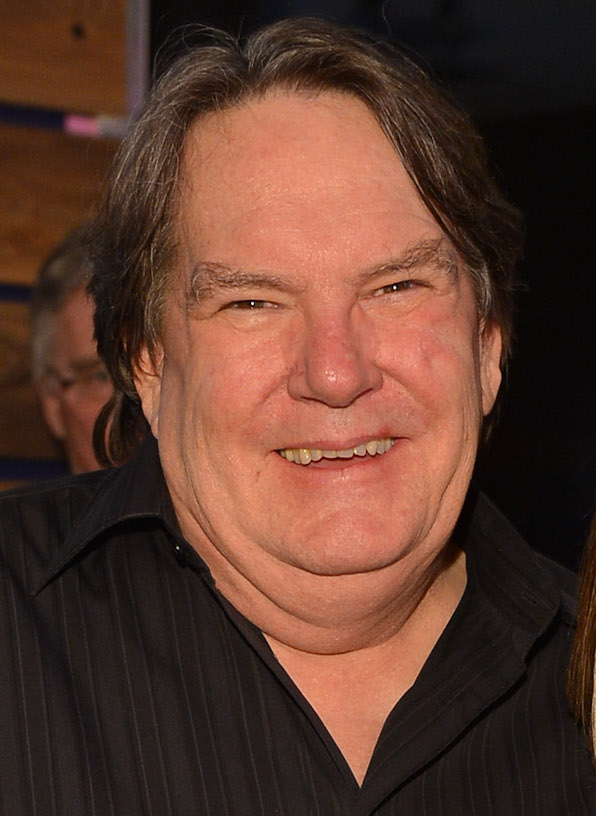
- Carmody at the 2013 Canadian Screen Awards Nominee Reception
- Born: Donald Carmody; April 16, 1951 (age 75); Providence, Rhode Island, U.S.
- Occupations: Film producer, television producer

Donald "Don" Carmody (born April 16, 1951) is an American-born Canadian film and television producer.

== Education ==
Born in Rhode Island and raised in Montreal, he earned a BA in communication studies from Loyola College, one of Concordia University's founding institutions, in 1972.

== Career ==
He began his career in the 1970s at Cinèpix Film Properties, where he worked on the early films of David Cronenberg with Ivan Reitman, and later moved to Harold Greenberg’s Astral Bellevue Pathé, where he was an executive in charge of production. Leaving Astral, he served as co-producer on Bob Clark’s box office smash, Porky's, for decades, Canada's highest-grossing film worldwide.

Carmody has produced some 100 films thus far, including Denis Villeneuve's Polytechnique (2009), The Mighty, Yesterday, The Boondock Saints, and he was a member of the producing team on the hit musical Chicago, which was shot in Toronto and won an Academy Award in 2002 for Best Picture. He has also produced the video game adaptations the Resident Evil and Silent Hill series. He is the recipient of five Canadian Screen Awards, and is a board member of the Canadian Film Centre.

== Filmography ==
=== Film ===
Year	Title	Director	Writer	Producer
1984	The Surrogate	Yes	Yes	Yes
1985	Junior	No	Yes	Yes
1989	Snake Eater II: The Drug Buster	No	Yes	No
1991	The Hitman	No	Yes	Yes

Producer

- Tulips (1981)
- Porky's (1981)
- Spacehunter: Adventures in the Forbidden Zone (1983)
- Porky's II: The Next Day (1983)
- The Vindicator (1986)
- Meatballs III: Summer Job (1986)
- State Park (1988)
- Welcome Home (1989)
- Whispers (1990)
- Sidekicks (1992)
- Johnny Mnemonic (1995)
- The Substitute (1996) (Uncredited)
- Resident Evil: Apocalypse (2004)
- Some Things That Stay (2004)
- Silent Hill (2006)
- Skinwalkers (2007)
- Polytechnique (2009)
- The Boondock Saints II: All Saints Day (2009)
- Die (2010)
- Resident Evil: Afterlife (2010)
- Goon (2011)
- Breakaway (2011)
- Resident Evil: Retribution (2012)
- Home Again (2012)
- Silent Hill: Revelation (2012)
- The Mortal Instruments: City of Bones (2013)
- Pompeii (2014)
- Love, Rosie (2014)
- After the Ball (2015)
- Wait Till Helen Comes (2016)
- Tulipani, Love, Honour and a Bicycle (2017)
- Tokyo Trial (2017)
- 22 Chaser (2018)
- Lucky Day (2019)
- Death of a Ladies' Man (2020)
- Forgiveness (TBA)

Co-producer

- Shivers (1975)
- Rabid (1977)
- Split Image (1982)
- The Big Town (1987)
- Weekend at Bernie's II (1993)
- The Mighty (1998)
- The Third Miracle (1999)
- The Whole Nine Yards (2000)
- Chicago (2002)
- Amelia (2009)

Executive producer

- Blackout (1978)
- Yesterday (1981)
- The Hot Touch (1981)
- Strange but True (1983)
- Fred C. Dobbs Goes to Hollywood (1983)
- Cathy Smith: It's Only Rock N' Roll (1985)
- Switching Channels (1988)
- Physical Evidence (1989)
- The Lost World (1992)
- Primary Motive (1992)
- Guilty as Sin (1993)
- Squanto: A Warrior's Tale (1994)
- Love in Paris (1997)
- Critical Care (1997)
- Senseless (1998)
- 54 (1998)
- The Boondock Saints (1999) (Co-executive producer)
- In Too Deep (1999)
- Battlefield Earth (2000)
- The Art of War (2000)
- Get Carter (2000)
- The Pledge (2001) (Uncredited)
- The Caveman's Valentine (2001) (Uncredited)
- 3000 Miles to Graceland (2001)
- Driven (2001)
- Angel Eyes (2001)
- Heist (2001)
- City by the Sea (2002)
- Wrong Turn (2003)
- Gothika (2003)
- Assault on Precinct 13 (2005)
- Lucky Number Slevin (2006)
- Outlander (2008)
- The Echo (2008)
- 45 R.P.M. (2008)
- Orphan (2009)
- Whiteout (2009)
- Hidden 3D (2011)
- An Insignificant Harvey (2011)
- The Factory (2012)
- 13 Eerie (2013)
- Bad Country (2014)
- He Hated Pigeons (2015)

Miscellaneous crew

Year	Film	Role	Notes
1971	McCabe & Mrs. Miller	Production assistant	Uncredited
1973	Keep It in the Family	Production assistant	
1973	The Pyx	Production assistant	Uncredited
1975	The True Story of Eskimo Nell	Second unit coordinator	
1976	Death Weekend	Associate producer	
1977	Battle Beyond the Street	Associate producer	
1979	Meatballs	Production executive	
1980	Death Ship	Production executive	
1980	Terror Train	Production executive	
1981	Hard Feelings	Production executive	
1985	Jagged Edge	Assistant producer	Uncredited
1989	Winter People	Bond representative	
1989	Speed Zone	Bond representative	
1996	The Substitute	Bond representative	
1997	Good Will Hunting	Production consultant	Uncredited
1998	Knock Off	Bond representative	

Production manager

Year	Film	Role	Notes
1973	U-Turn	Assistant production manager	
1974	The Apple, the Stem and the Seeds	Production manager	
1975	Eskimo Nell	Production manager	Uncredited
1975	Tout feu, tout femme	Production manager	
1975	Shivers	Production manager	
1975	The Mystery of the Million Dollar Hockey Puck	Production manager	
1977	Rabid	Production manager	
1981	Heartbreak High	Production manager	

As an actor

Year	Film	Role
1994	Squanto: A Warrior's Tale	Archangel Officer
1997	Critical Care	Maitre d'
1999	The Boondock Saints	Mafioso #2
1999	The Third Miracle	Jack Da Sica
2011	Goon	Guy in Leather Jacket

Location management

Year	Film	Notes
1973	Keep It in the Family	
1974	The Apprenticeship of Duddy Kravitz	Uncredited
1974	The White Dawn	Uncredited

Thanks

- Pay the Ghost (2015)
- Adventures in Public School (2017)
- Anon (2018)

=== Television ===
Executive producer

- Mary and Joseph: A Story of Faith (1979) (TV movie)
- A Man Called Intrepid (1979)
- The Tracker (2001) (TV movie)
- Tokyo Trial (2016)
- Between (2015–16)
- Northern Rescue (2019)

Line producer

- The Intruder Within (1981) (TV movie) (Uncredited)
- Payoff (1991) (TV movie)

Producer

- The Late Shift (1996) (TV movie)
- The Secret Life of Marilyn Monroe (2015)
- Shadowhunters (2016)

Miscellaneous crew

Year	Title	Role	Notes
1980	Chairman of the Board	Production auditor	TV movie
2015−16	Between	President: Don Carmody Television	

Production manager

Year	Title	Notes
1973	Across This Land	TV movie
1980	Guilty or Not Guilty	TV movie
1991	Payoff	TV movie
