= Edward Stuart McDougall =

Canadian politician

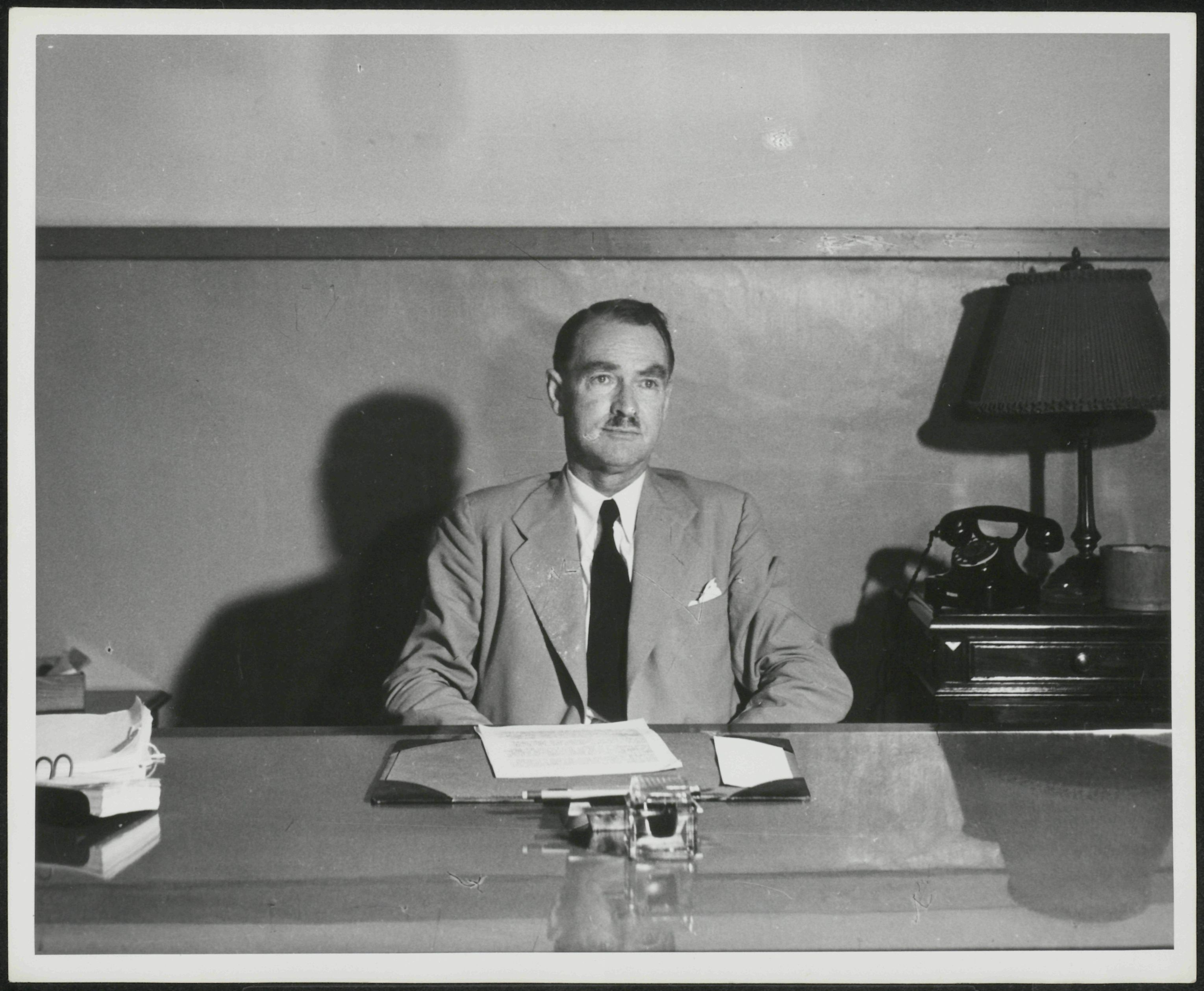
- Born: 25 September 1886; Montreal, Quebec, Canada
- Died: 14 February 1957 (aged 70); Montreal, Quebec, Canada

Edward Stuart McDougall (25 September 1886 – 14 February 1957) was a Canadian politician and judge. He was a judge on the Court of King's Bench of Quebec and the International Military Tribunal for the Far East. In 1936, McDougall was briefly the Quebec minister of finance in the first government of Adélard Godbout.

McDougall was born in Montreal, Quebec, Canada. He earned a law degree from McGill University and became a member of the Quebec bar in 1913. At the beginning of the First World War, in 1914, he volunteered in Princess Patricia's Canadian Light Infantry of the Canadian Expeditionary Force. He was sent to the front in 1915 and was wounded in 1917, after which he returned to Montreal. At the end of the war, McDougall was a major.

In 1922, he married Katherine Eleanor Mackenzie. They had a daughter.

In June 1936, Adélard Godbout succeeded Louis-Alexandre Taschereau as premier of Quebec. Wanting to dissociate from old government, which was sullied by the scandals, Godbout sought out some non-politicians to serve in his cabinet. McDougall accepted Godbout's offer to become provincial treasurer (minister of finance). McDougall was sworn in on 27 June 1936 and immediately began campaigning for election to the Quebec National Assembly in the 1936 election as a Liberal. McDougall ran in the constituency of Montreal-Saint-Laurent. On 17 August 1936, McDougall was beaten by Thomas Joseph Coonan, the Union Nationale candidate, by less than 200 votes. The Union Nationale won more seats than the Liberals, and Godbout's short term as premier also came to an end.

In 1942, McDougall was appointed as a judge of the Court of King's Bench of Quebec (the former name of the Quebec Court of Appeal), the highest appellate court in Quebec. In 1946, McDougall represented Canada as a judge on the International Military Tribunal for the Far East in Tokyo.

McDougall died in Montreal. He was survived by his wife, daughter and 3 grandchildren.
