= Delfín Jaranilla =

Filipino judge

The Honorable Delfín Jaranilla
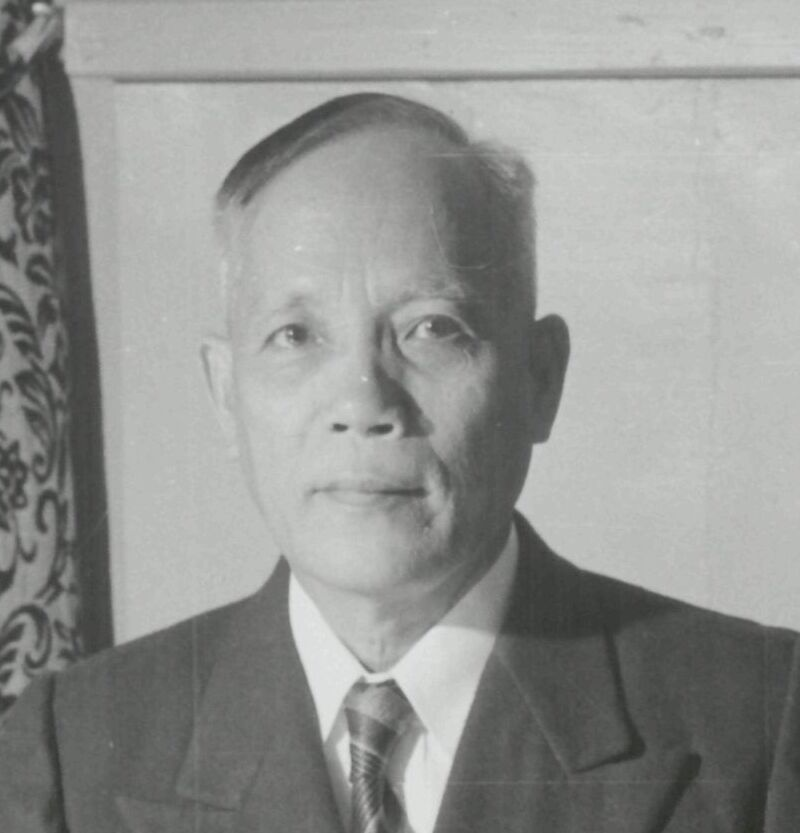

Attorney General of Philippines
- In office July 1, 1927 – June 30, 1932
- Preceded by: Alexander A. Reyes

Secretary of Justice, Agriculture, and Commerce
- In office February 27, 1945 – July 12, 1945
- President: Sergio Osmeña

44th Associate Justice of the Supreme Court of the Philippines
- In office June 6, 1945 – June 6, 1946
- Appointed by: Sergio Osmeña
- Preceded by: José Lopez Vito
- Succeeded by: José Hontiveros

Personal details
- Born: Delfín Jaranilla y Jebución; December 24, 1883 La Paz, Iloilo, Captaincy General of the Philippines, Spanish Empire
- Died: June 4, 1980 (aged 96) Philippines
- Education: University of Tennessee; Georgetown University (LLB)

Delfín Jaranilla y Jebución (December 24, 1883 – June 4, 1980) was a Filipino judge. He served as the Attorney General of the Philippines from 1927 to 1932, as part of the American colonial Insular Government. He was named Judge Advocate General and after the Japanese conquest of the Philippines was forced on the Bataan Death March. He served as Secretary of Justice, Agriculture, and Commerce in 1945. After holding the position of Secretary of Justice, he was appointed the 44th Associate Justice of the Supreme Court of the Philippines. After the conclusion of World War II, he was selected to serve as a Justice of the Philippines on the International Military Tribunal for the Far East.

== Biography ==
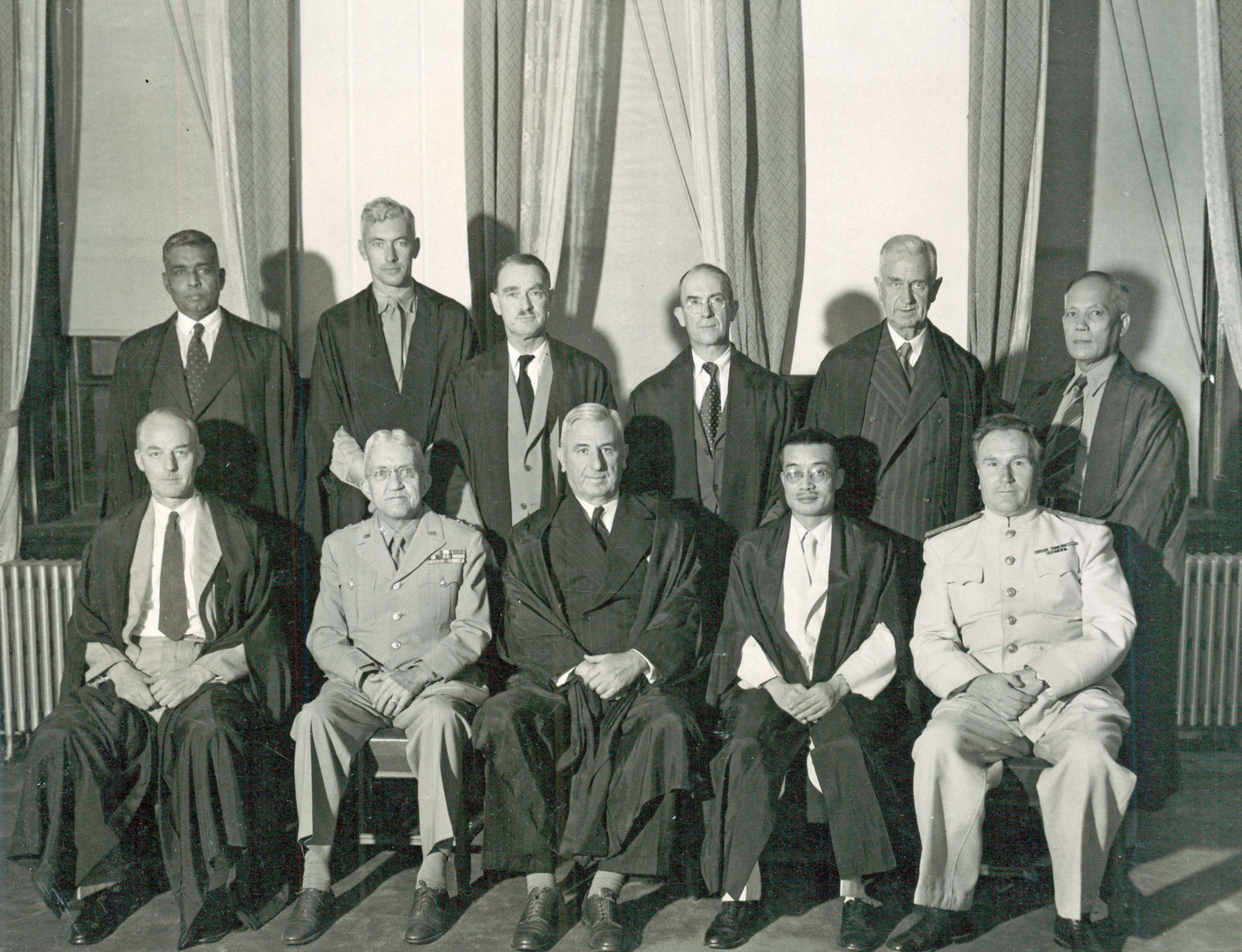
The judges at the International Military Tribunal for the Far East Ichigaya Court

Jaranilla was born in La Paz, Iloilo City, to Antonio Jerous Jaranilla and Juana Jebucion. In 1903, he was dispatched to the United States under the 'Pensionado' scholarship programme and studied at Santa Ana High School. He graduated from Georgetown University in 1907 with a diploma in law.

He died on June 4, 1980, at age 96.

== In popular culture ==
Jaranilla was portrayed by Bert Matias in the NHK miniseries Tokyo Trial (2016).
