= Henri Bernard (magistrate) =

French judge (1899–1986)

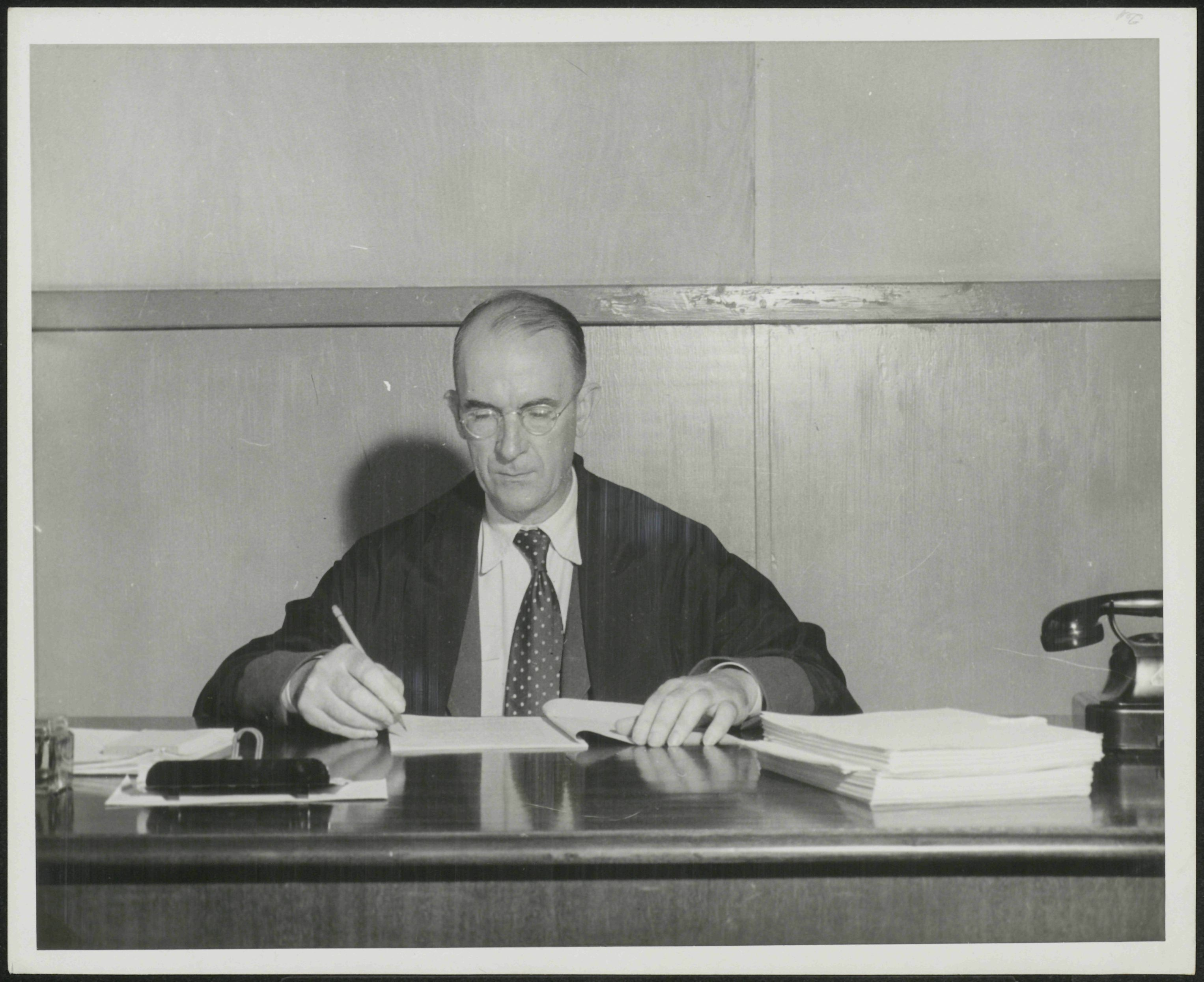
Henri Bernard in Tokyo, Japan

Henri Bernard (8 October 1899 – 15 February 1986) was a French lawyer and judge. Bernard made a career in the colonies before joining Free France during the Second World War. After the war, he was one of the judges of the International Military Tribunal for the Far East.

== Biography ==
Henri Bernard was born on 8 October 1899 in Arles, and obtained his law degree at the University of Aix-en-Provence. After his graduation, he became a colonial magistrate. In 1931, he was a deputy public prosecutor in Conakry, French Guinea. In 1933, he was the examining magistrate in Dakar, French West Africa. In 1938, he was a public prosecutor in Bangui, French Equatorial Africa. In 1941 he was promoted to deputy Attorney General, and in 1943 the Avocat-General. During his time as Avocat-General, he enjoyed the support of Minister of Colonies Georges Mandel.

During the Second World War, Bernard joined Free France. For supporting the Free French forces in Brazzaville on 28 August 1940, he was sentenced to death in absentia in July 1941 by the military tribunal of Gannat in Vichy France. In Free France, he was appointed colonel and was posted to Beirut as the government’s representative (Commissaire du gouvernment).

After the war, Bernard returned to his duties as a colonial magistrate. He was later appointed as the French judge at the International Military Tribunal for the Far East ("Tokyo Trial") in Tokyo by the Minister of the Overseas, following the withdrawal of fellow magistrate Henri Heimburger. Bernard spoke little English, and was assisted by Jacques Gouëlou, an English teacher from Lycée Michelet of Paris. He issued a dissenting opinion at the Tribunal, criticizing the trial proceedings as partial, and with a selective prosecution that excluded Emperor Hirohito, whom he considered the "principal perpetrator" of the war.

He died in 1986.
