= Red Army Military Law Academy =

Red Army Military Law Academy (later Soviet Army Military Law Academy) (Russian: Военно-юридическая академия Красной Армии (Совеской Армии)) is a military higher educational institution of the Soviet Army that was designed to train officers for military tribunals and military prosecutor's offices, being active from November 5, 1939 to May 18, 1956. It was formed the base of the Military Law Department of the All-Union Law Academy. It was then transformed into the Military Law Department of the Lenin Military-Political Academy, and was eventually inherited by the Military University of the Ministry of Defense of the Russian Federation.
