= Sunchaser Pictures =

Sunchaser Pictures is a company formed by writer/director/producer Gavin Heffernan, based in Hollywood, California.

== Filmography ==
- The Steaks (2000)
- Expiration (2004)
- Santa Croce (2007)
- Grand Wheel (2008)
- Devolution (2010)
- Devolution: Reckoning (2011)

== Awards ==
- The collection of five Sunchaser short films Devolution won the Audience Choice award at the 2010 HollyShorts Film Festival in Los Angeles.
- Grand Wheel premiered at SXSW Film Festival, screened at multiple festivals from 2008 to 2010, and won a Special Jury Prize for best cinematography at the Canadian Filmmakers' Festival for Sunchaser filmmakers Erik Forssell and Eric Koretz. The anti-war film was also presented with the Silver Bear at the 37th Festival of Nations in Austria, as well as Best Experimental Film at the 2009 Oxford Film Festival.
- Expiration won Best Feature Film at the Canadian Filmmakers' Festival in 2004. EFilmCritic also named Gavin Heffernan Best New Filmmaker in 2004 for Expiration.
