= Harun Mehmedinović =

American film director

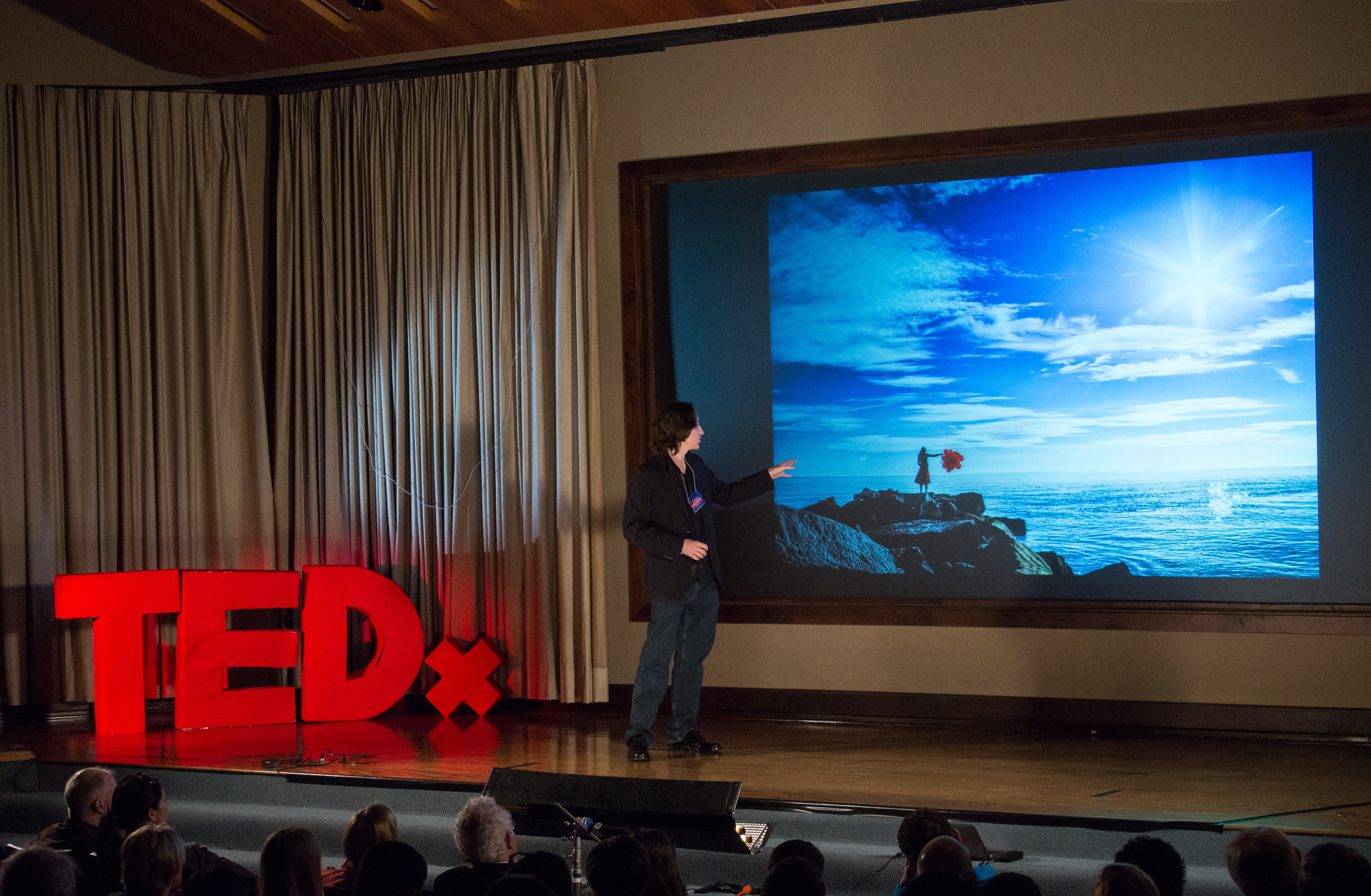
- Born: Harun Mehmedinović; Sarajevo, Bosnia and Herzegovina
- Education: UCLA; American Film Institute
- Occupations: photographer cinematographer director writer
- Years active: 2003–present
- Website: http://www.bloodhoney.com

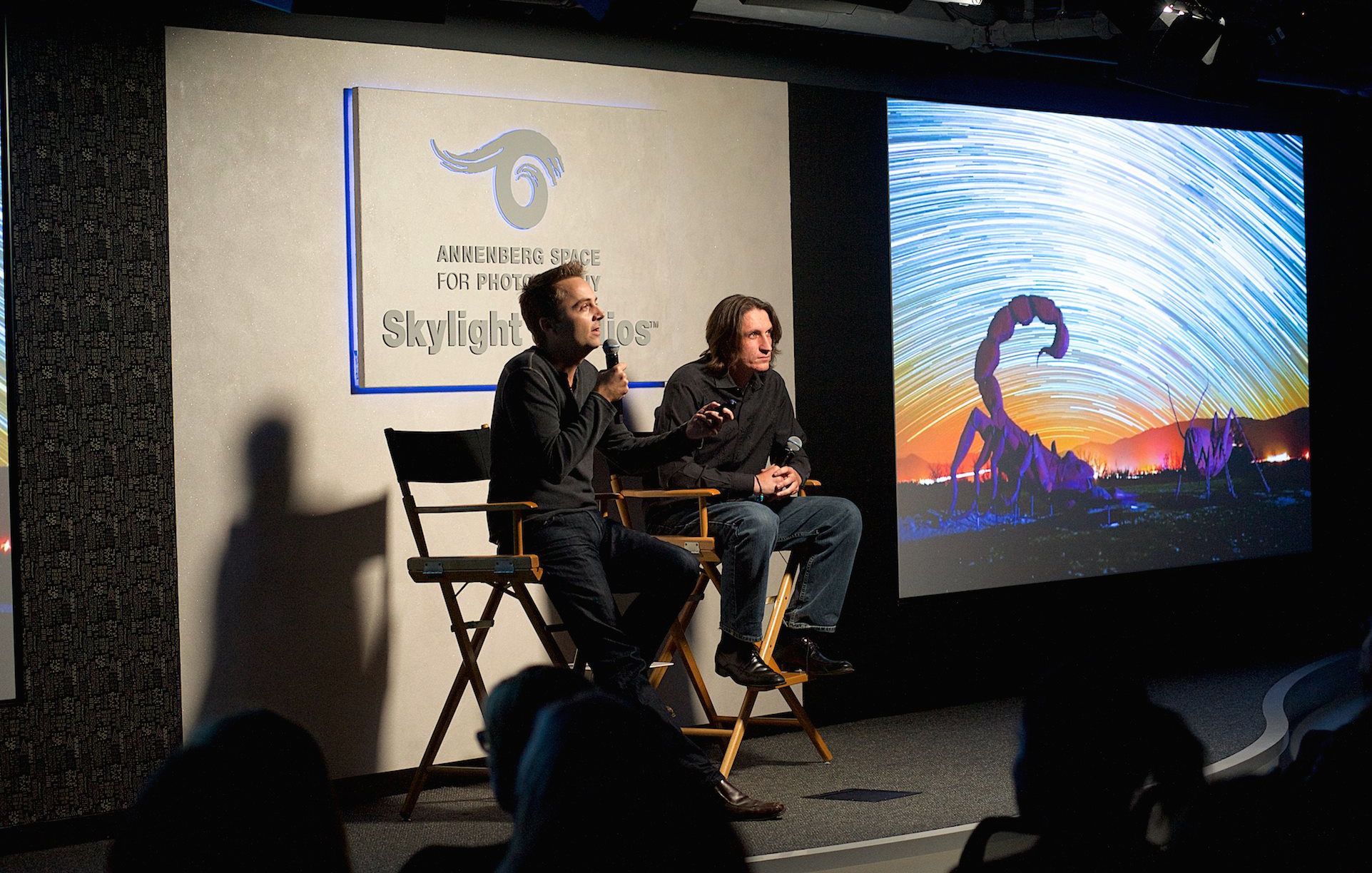
Harun Mehmedinović and Gavin Heffernan at SKYGLOWPROJECT.COM event at The Annenberg Photo Space in Los Angeles

Harun Mehmedinović is a Bosnian American director, screenwriter, photographer, cinematographer, author and Bosnian Genocide and Siege of Sarajevo survivor. He is a graduate of UCLA School of Theater, Film and Television and American Film Institute. He is the co-creator of the viral timelapse series SKYGLOW, cinematographer and co-producer of the Leonardo DiCaprio-produced documentary Ice on Fire for HBO, which premiered at Cannes Film Festival May 22, 2019. and cinematographer of IMAX Grand Canyon: Rivers of Time (2022). He is the cinematographer of the climate documentary Legion 44 (2024).

His film In the Name of the Son, premiered at the Telluride Film Festival and went on to win over thirty international awards including Shanghai Film Festival.

== Career ==
Mehmedinović is a graduate of UCLA School of Theater, Film and Television and American Film Institute. He wrote and directed In the Name of the Son, which premiered at the Telluride Film Festival and went on to win over thirty international awards.

He is also a photographer and contributor to BBC Earth, National Geographic, Vogue Italia, and has spoken at TED about his photography work. His photograph of the cloud-inverted Grand Canyon was listed among the 2015 Best Travel Photos of the Year by National Geographic. In 2016, Mehmedinović was a member of the BBC Earth Instagram team that won the Webby Award for "Best Photography and Graphics." His work has been featured by various media outlets, including The New York Times, Wired, Time, Sierra Club Magazine, Forbes, NPR, Los Angeles Times, LA Weekly, Vice, and Washington Post, among others.

Mehmedinović has also contributed time-lapse videos for use in concerts and events, most notably by The Rolling Stones for their song Moonlight Mile during their Zip Code Tour in 2015 as well as for their songs Wild Horses and Angie for their Desert Trip appearance, Roger Waters for his song Breathe during the 2016 Desert Trip festival, Cosmic Gate for their music video for the single am2pm in 2016, Paul Simon's 2018 Homeward Bound Farewell Tour, and John Mayer's 2022 SOB ROCK Tour.

Mehmedinović is an author of three photography books: Seance, in 2013, with a foreword by Aleksandar Hemon, Persona in 2015, and SKYGLOW in 2017. Mehmedinovic collaborated with Gavin Heffernan on SKYGLOW, which was a crowdfunded book and Blu-Ray intended to tackle the rising danger and damage of urban light pollution. The fundraising campaign generated a tremendous amount of publicity and ended on May 9, 2015, as the fourth most successful Kickstarter campaign in the Photobooks category. SKYGLOW was featured by Science Channel's Outrageous Acts of Science, National Park Service as part of their official 2016 Centennial celebration video, and was released as a hardcover book and Blu-Ray series in April 2017.

In 2019, Mehmedinović competed work as a cinematographer on the Leonardo DiCaprio-produced Ice on Fire for HBO, which premiered to a standing ovation at Cannes Film Festival as part of the Official Selection.

== Credits ==
=== Feature documentary films ===
- SKYGLOW (Upcoming) – Director/Editor/Co-Cinematographer
- LEGION 44 (2024) - Cinematographer
- IMAX GRAND CANYON: RIVERS OF TIME (2022) – Co-Cinematographer
- ICE ON FIRE (2019) – Cinematographer/Co-Producer
- AKICITA (2018) – Co-Cinematographer

=== Skyglow ===
- WET MOUNTAIN VALLEY (2021) – Co-director/Cinematographer/Editor
- ANCESTRAL NIGHTS (2019) – Co-director/Cinematographer/Editor
- HAARP BOREALIS (2019) – Director/Cinematographer/Editor
- SKYGLOW NYC (2018) – Co-director/Cinematographer/Editor
- Colorado Serenade (2018) – Director/Cinematographer/Editor
- Kaibab Requiem (2017) – Director/Cinematographer/Editor
- Mojave Forsaken (2017) – Co-director/Cinematographer/Editor
- Stormhenge (2017) – Co-director/Cinematographer
- POLI'AHU (2017) – Co-director/Cinematographer
- Ft. Union Lullaby (2016) – Director/Cinematographer/Editor
- Hades Exhales (2016) – Director/Cinematographer/Editor
- Tortugas Rock (2016) – Director/Cinematographer/Editor
- Dishdance (2015) – Co-director/Cinematographer/Editor
- Promo (2015) – Co-director/Cinematographer
- YIKÁÍSDÁHÁ: "That Which Comes Before the Dawn" (2014) – Co-director/Cinematographer

=== BBC Earth ===
- Kaibab Elegy (2017) – Director/Cinematographer/Editor
- Sandstorm Alomogordo (2016) – Director/Cinematographer/Editor
- Amargosa Superbloom (2016) – Director/Cinematographer/Editor
- Mojave Blues (2016) – Director/Cinematographer/Editor
- Elkmont Symphony (2016) – Director/Cinematographer/Editor
- Shenandoah Reverie (2015) – Director/Cinematographer/Editor
- Melancholy Gorge (2015) – Director/Cinematographer/Editor
- Pinnacles (2015) – Co-director/Cinematographer
- Tempest Vermilion (2015) – Co-director/Cinematographer
- Wavelight (2014) – Co-director/Cinematographer

=== Concerts and Music Videos ===
- Cielo Hemon: Howdy, Hand of God! (2021) – Director/Cinematographer/Editor
- Paul Simon: Homeward Bound Tour (2018) – Co-director/Cinematographer
- Cosmic Gate: AM2PM (2016) – Co-director/Cinematographer
- Roger Waters: "Breathe" visuals for Desert Trip Indio and the 2016 Tour (2016) – Co-director/Cinematographer
- The Rolling Stones: "Angie" visuals for Desert Trip Megaconcert – Co-director/Cinematographer
- The Rolling Stones: "Wild Horses" visuals for Desert Trip Megaconcert – Co-director/Cinematographer
- The Rolling Stones: "Moonlight Mile" visuals for ZIP CODE Tour (2015) – Co-director/Cinematographer

=== Short Fiction Films ===
- In the Name of the Son (2007) – Writer/Director
