= Hursley (disambiguation) =

Hursley is a village in Hampshire, England.

Hursley may also refer to:

- HMS Hursley (L84), a Second World War escort destroyer
- Hursley House, a mansion in Hursley, Hampshire, England

== People ==
- Frank and Doris Hursley (1902–1989 and 1898–1984), husband-and-wife team who wrote American serials
- Joe Hursley (born 1979), actor and musician living in California, US
