= Gavin Heffernan =

Canadian filmmaker and screenwriter

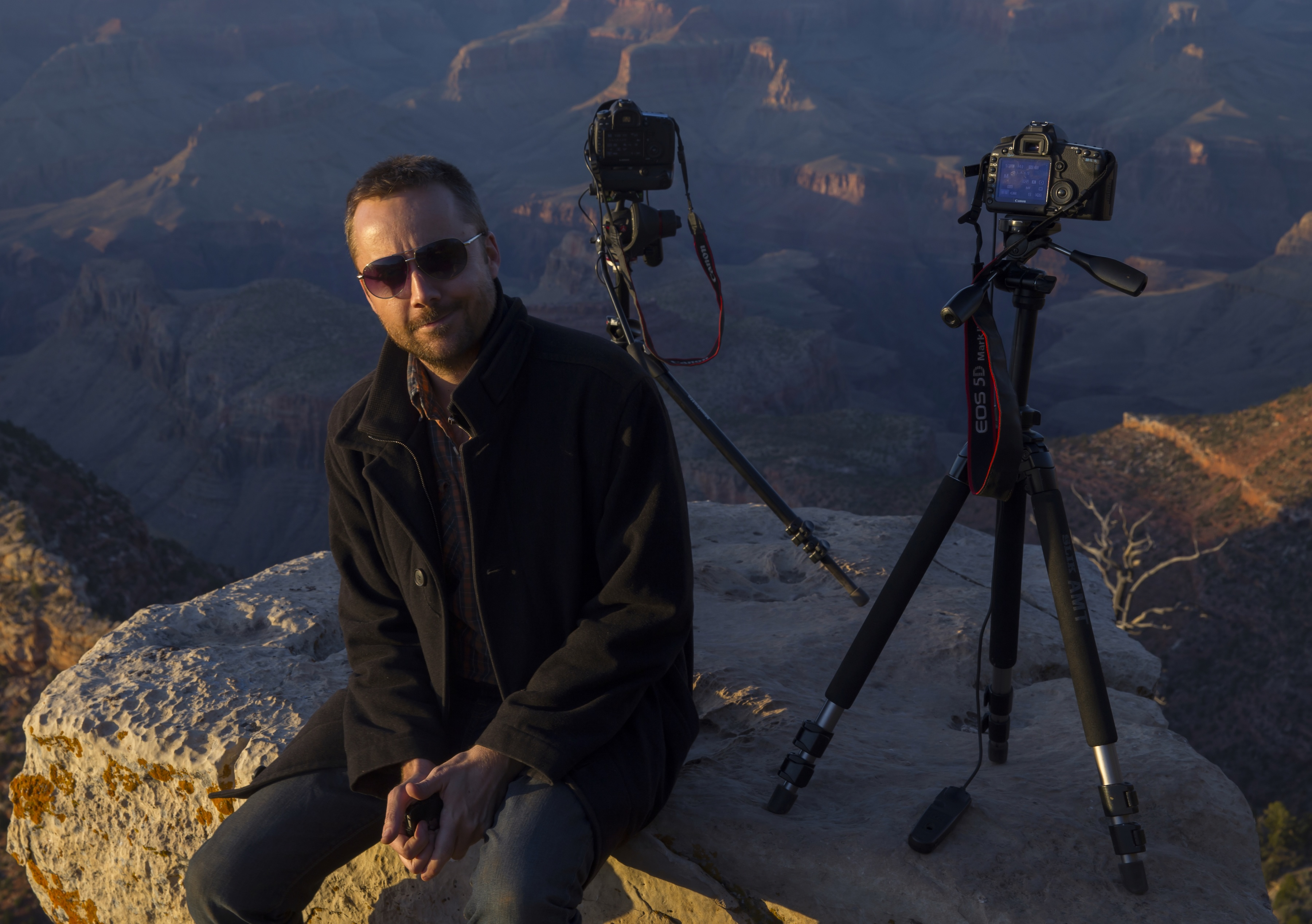
- Heffernan at Grand Canyon National Park in April 2014
- Born: April 2, 1980 (age 46); Oakville, Ontario, Canada
- Occupations: Filmmaker, photographer, producer
- Years active: 1999–present
- Website: www.gavinbheffernan.com

Gavin Heffernan (born April 2, 1980) is a Canadian filmmaker, photographer, and producer. He co-wrote the psychological horror film The Taking of Deborah Logan (2014) and Paranormal Activity: The Ghost Dimension (2015) with writing partner Adam Robitel. Also known for directing experimental visual works, primarily timelapse, featured in the Rolling Stones' 2015 Zip Code Tour as well as their 2016 Desert Trip shows. Heffernan also contributed visuals to Pink Floyd's Roger Waters' 2016 concerts, Paul Simon's 2018 Homeward Bound Farewell Tour, and John Mayer's 2022 Sob Rock tour.

== Early life ==
Gavin Heffernan was born on April 2, 1980, in Oakville, Ontario. He is an alumnus of McGill University and the American Film Institute. While attending McGill, Gavin wrote, directed, and starred in the feature film Expiration (2003). Though budgeted at a meagre $10,000, the film was awarded the Grand Jury Prize at the 2004 Canadian Filmmakers' Festival, received a 76% critic score on Rotten Tomatoes, and acclaim from publications Variety, and Ain't it Cool News.

== Career ==
His unconventional anti-war documentary Grand Wheel (2008) premiered at SXSW and played more than fifty film festivals in twenty countries. His 2010 collection of experimental shorts about the fall of man titled "Devolution" premiered at the Florida Film Festival and won an Audience Award at the 2010 HollyShorts Film Festival. The sci-fi follow-up "Devolution: Reckoning" premiered at the 2011 Festival du Nouveau Cinema in Montreal. In October 2011, Heffernan was attached to co-write the screen adaptation of Ray Manzarek's The Poet in Exile, a novel exploring the notion that Jim Morrison of the Doors staged his death in 1971.

Heffernan's timelapse art has been featured in Leonardo DiCaprio's Ice on Fire global warming doc for HBO, Virgin America flights, BBC Earth, Bravo's first scripted show Girlfriends' Guide to Divorce, and many other press and TV outlets including The New York Times, CNN, Time, National Geographic, CBS News, and Wired. Borrego Springs, California, named their 2014 town festival after Heffernan's "Borrego Stardance" astro timelapse and October 25 was subsequently named "Gavin Heffernan Day" in San Diego County by Senator Joel Anderson.

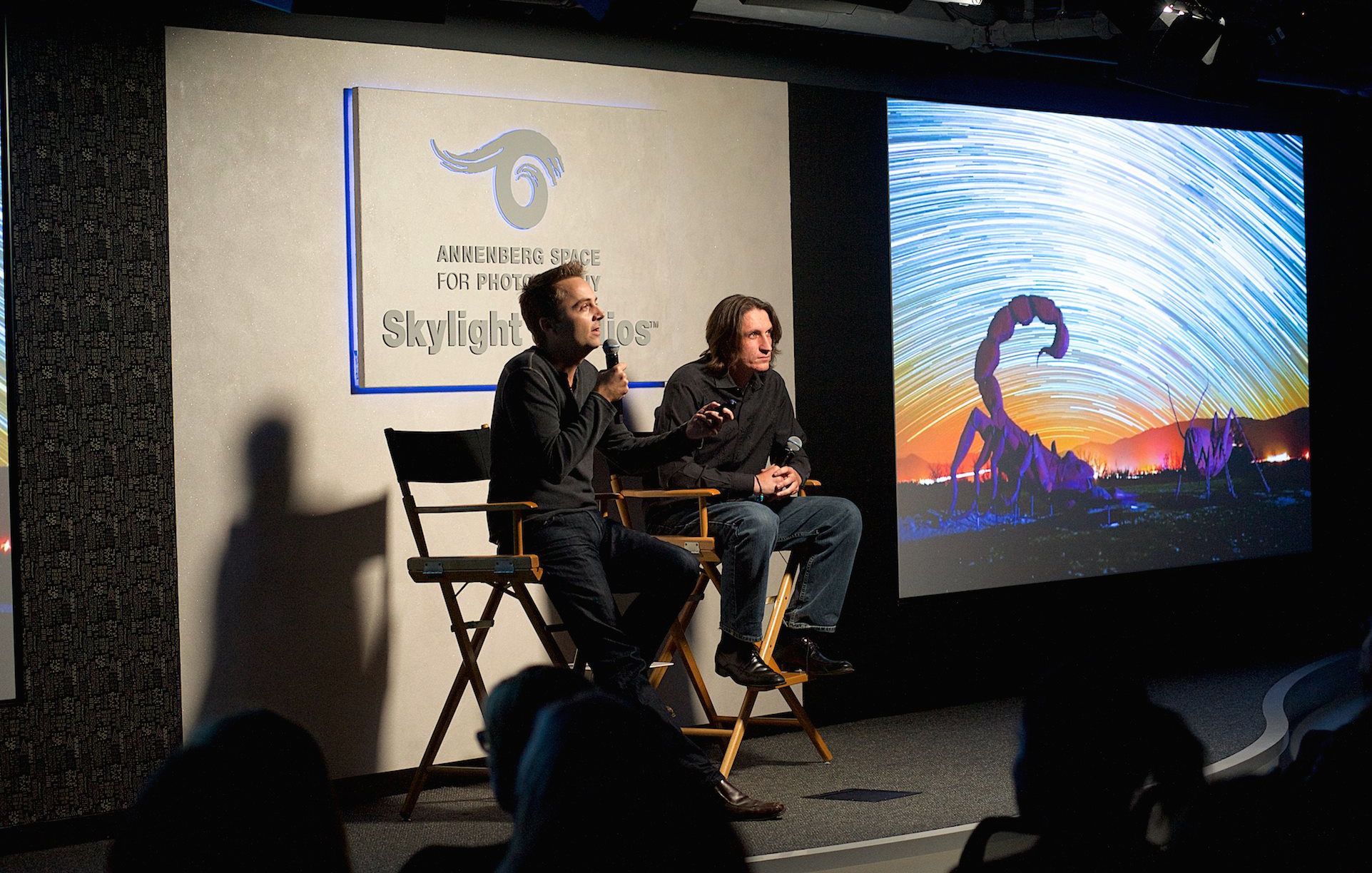
SKYGLOW event at the Annenberg Photo Space in Los Angeles

In 2015, Heffernan and Harun Mehmedinovic co-founded SKYGLOW, a crowdfunded book and Blu Ray project to tackle the rising danger and damage of urban light pollution. The fundraising campaign generated significant publicity and ended on May 9, 2015, as the fourth most successful Kickstarter campaign ever in the Photobooks category. The SKYGLOW book released in April 2017 at SKYGLOWPROJECT.COM and was created in association with the International Dark Sky Association.

In July 2021, Heffernan and Robitel had partnered with Darren Aronofsky on a thriller series for Netflix titled The Craving. In July 2019, the duo had teamed up with Sam Raimi on an "Untitled Supernatural Thriller" for Sony Pictures.
