= In the Name of the Son =

In the Name of the Son can refer to:

- In the Name of the Son (2007 film), a 2007 short film
- In the Name of the Son (2012 film), a 2012 Belgian film
