= Fakes (TV series) =

Canadian television sitcom

- Genre: Crime comedy
- Created by: David Turko
- Written by: David Turko; Tabia Lau
- Directed by: Jasmin Mozaffari; Joyce Wong; Mars Horodyski
- Starring: Emilija Baranac; Jennifer Tong
- Countries of origin: Canada; United States
- No. of seasons: 1
- No. of episodes: 10

Production
- Executive producers: Simon Barry; Lilly Burns; Jake Fuller; Stephen Hegyes; Tony Hernandez; David Turko
- Producers: Giuliana Bertuzzi; Zack Tucker Gangnes; Todd Giroux
- Production locations: West Vancouver, British Columbia
- Running time: 21–22 minutes
- Production companies: Reality Distortion Field; Jax Media; Omnifilm Entertainment

Original release
- Network: CBC Gem (Canada); Netflix (United States)
- Release: September 1, 2022

Fakes is a comedy television series, which premiered in 2022 on CBC Gem in Canada and Netflix internationally. The series stars Emilija Baranac and Jennifer Tong as Zoe and Rebecca, two teenagers in West Vancouver, British Columbia who launch what quickly becomes the largest fake ID empire in North America. The series premiered September 1, 2022.

Each episode is portrayed from the perspective of one of the two young women, making use of the unreliable narrator technique as their respective viewpoints sometimes contradict each other. Richard Harmon, who plays the supporting character Tryst, highlighted this aspect of the show as a fun creative opportunity for him as an actor, because it allowed him to play more than one variation on the character, based on the differing views of his character in each of the main characters' perspectives, instead of having to maintain a single consistent characterization.

The series received two Canadian Screen Award nominations at the 11th Canadian Screen Awards in 2023, for Best Comedy Series and Best Picture Editing in a Children's or Youth Program or Series (Sabrina Pitre). The series also received two Writer's Guild of Canada nominations for Best Writing in a Comedy Series in 2023.

The show was confirmed to be cancelled on September 19, 2023. Jen Tong, who played the character Becca on the show, publicly announced the cancellation via social media, expressing her gratitude for the opportunity and thanking the fans for their support. The series had garnered a dedicated following, but ultimately, Netflix decided not to renew it for a second season.

== Episodes ==
No.	Title	Directed by	Written by	Original release date
1	"Teen Drinking is Very Bad..."	Jasmin Mozaffari	David Turko	September 1, 2022
2	"Yo I Got a Fake ID Though"	Jasmin Mozaffari	David Turko	September 1, 2022
3	"Don't Panic (definitely don't)"	Jasmin Mozaffari	Tabia Lau, David Turko	September 1, 2022
4	"We Are the Captains Now"	Jasmin Mozaffari	Tabia Lau, David Turko	September 1, 2022
5	"Real G's Move in Silence Like Lasagna"	Joyce Wong	David Turko	September 1, 2022
6	"A Cup of Ambition"	Mars Horodyski	Tabia Lau	September 1, 2022
7	"All Eyes on Me"	Joyce Wong	Tabia Lau	September 1, 2022
8	"King of Anything"	Mars Horodyski	Tabia Lau	September 1, 2022
9	"Forged in Stone (or something)"	Joyce Wong	Tabia Lau	September 1, 2022
10	"She Said She Said"	Joyce Wong	David Turko	September 1, 2022
