= Jackie English =

Canadian television host and actor

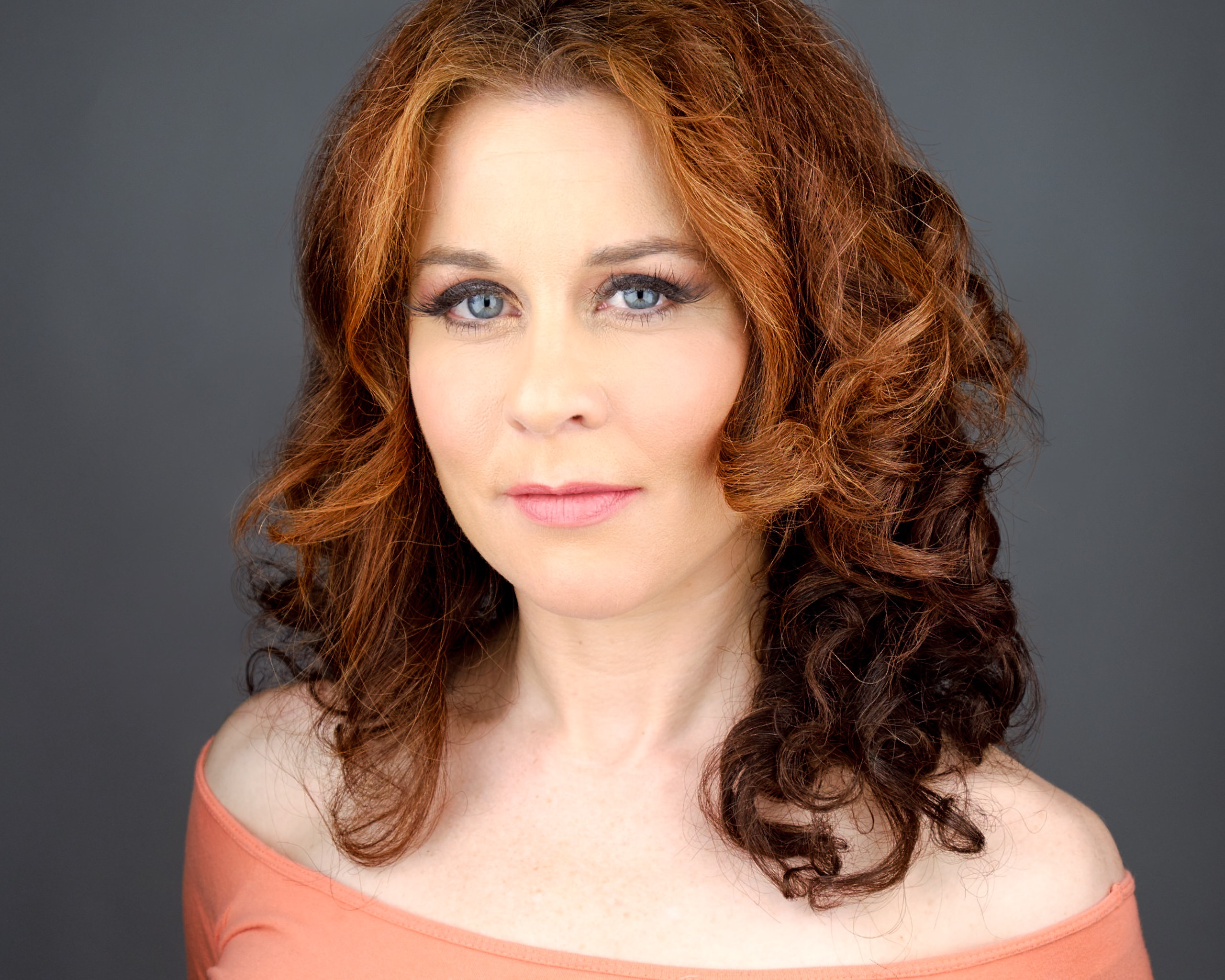

Jackie English is a Canadian television host, actress, dancer, choreographer, director, filmmaker and performer.

== Early life ==
English was born in Toronto, Ontario. English later moved to Montreal where she graduated from McGill University in mechanical engineering. After university she worked for a year at Capgemini in Montreal as a consultant before becoming a full time performing artist

== Career ==
After leaving the corporate world, English became a host of TVOKids, TVOntario's after school block of children's programs, alongside Milton Barns, Mark Sykes and Nicole Stamp, and later Ryan Fields. English appeared in live interstitial breaks between shows such as Art Attack, Arthur, Dino Dan and The Magic School Bus. During these segments she would perform original characters including Jigsaw Jill and interview noteworthy Canadians including Robert Munsch and Perdita Felician. English also appeared in number of original TVO Kids series BOD TV, as Artbot in Artbot, Nifty Girl in Super Citizens, the mayor in The Reading Rangers, and was the in-house choreographer for music videos. Later English became the on-location host to in-studio hosts Kara Harun and Dalmar Abuzeid, where she reported on kids news including interviewing Chris Bosh, visiting Cirque du Soleil and the ROM. Best known was her 40 episodes of the series Jackie's School of Dance which was nominated for two A.C.T. Awards.

In 2011, English wrote and directed her first film, a one-minute short film called NIMBY which won first prize at the Toronto Urban Film Festival where judge Atom Egoyan called it "extraordinary." She then started a film collective called The Splinter Unit which produced 8 films, including Out directed by Jeremy Lalonde, which premiered at TIFF.

In 2017 English's first feature film Becoming Burlesque, starring Shiva Negar with the support of Telefilm, premiered at Whistler Film Festival. The film was the opening film at the Canadian Film Festival and won Best Film at the Tryon Film Festival in North Carolina before its Canadian and American Theatrical release, followed by digital distribution in North America. English was declared a Canadian Director To Watch by Broadway World.

As an actress, English has appeared in TV series CBC's Frankie Drake Mysteries, new Netflix Series Dare Me, Rookie Blue, Beauty and the Beast, The Handmaid's Tale, The Accused and feature film You Gotta Believe.

As a choreographer, English created 60 episodes of TFO series Minivers, dances for Second City MainStage, I, Martin Short, Goes Home.

== Filmography ==
Film
Year	Film	Role	Notes
2011	Christmas Magic	Nurse	Hallmark
2011	NIMBY	Writer/Director	Winner of TUFF
2012	Anitviral	Waitress	Directed by Brandon Cronenberg
2015	Duty Calls	Director / Producer	Funded by BravoFact!
2017	Becoming Burlesque	Writer / Director	Produced by Telefilm
2019	Buffaloed	Drunk Woman	Directed by Tanya Wexler
2020	Flashback	Violet	Directed by Christopher MacBride
2024	You Gotta Believe	Ditsy Attendant	Directed by Ty Roberts
2023	Out of My Mind	Maria's Mom	Produced by Disney

Television
Series	Role	Notes
Dare Me	Deena Diaz	Produced by Netflix
Grand Army	Shopkeeper	Produced by Netflix
Frankie Drake Mysteries	Vera Jean	Produced by Shaftesbury
Cracked	Passenger	Produced by CBC
Beauty and the Beast	Janie	Aired on CBS
Rookie Blue	Brooke Sloane	Aired on Global, ABC
TVO Kids	Self	Produced by TVO
The Reading Rangers	The Mayor of Docville	Produced by TVO
Super Citizens	Nifty Girl	Produced by TVO
BodTV	Various	Produced by TVO
Tumbletown Tales	Various	Produced by TVO
Artbot	Arbot	Produced by TVO
Jackie's School of Dance	Self / Choreographer	Produced by TVO
Martin Short Goes Home	Choreographer	Produced by Second City
Minivers	Choreographer	Produced by TFO

== Awards, festivals and nominations ==
Year	Nominated work	Role	Association	Category	Result
2008	Tumbletown Tales (TVO)	Voice actor	Gemini Awards	Best Children's or Youth Fiction Program or Series	Nominated
2009	Jackie's School of Dance (TVO)	Choreographer	Alliance of Children's Television Awards	Best Children's TV Series	Nominated
2011	NIMBY	Director	Toronto Urban Film Festival (TUFF)	Best Film	Winner
2014	Out (written by Jeremy Lalonde)	Producer	Directors Guild of Canada	Best Short Film	Nominated
2016	Duty Calls (written by Sean Cullen)	Director/producer	Canadian Film Festival	Best Actress in a Short	Winner
2016	Duty Calls (written by Sean Cullen)	Director/producer	BravoFACT!	$30,000 grant	Winner
2017	Becoming Burlesque	Director/writer	Tryon International Film Festival	Best Film	Winner
2017	Becoming Burlesque	Director/writer	Tryon International Film Festival	Audience Choice Award	Winner
2017	Becoming Burlesque	Director/writer	Star Ranch Texas Nudist Film Festival	Audience Choice Award	Winner
2017	Becoming Burlesque	Director/writer	Canadian Film Festival	Official Selection Opening Film	
2019	Diamonds in the Rough	Director	Toronto International Short Festival	Official Selection	
