= Junior's Giant =

2022 Canadian short film

- Directed by: Paula Brancati
- Written by: Debra McGrath
- Produced by: Paula Brancati; Candice Chow-How; Ryan Goldhar; Debra McGrath; Colin Mochrie
- Starring: Eric Peterson; Kinley Mochrie; Debra McGrath
- Cinematography: Scott McClellan
- Edited by: Jason P.J. Deschamps
- Music by: Anthony Brancati
- Production company: Bankrupt T. Clown Productions
- Release date: September 17, 2022 (Female Eye)
- Running time: 16 minutes
- Country: Canada
- Language: English

Junior's Giant is a Canadian short drama film, directed by Paula Brancati and released in 2022. The film stars Eric Peterson as Junior, an elderly man suffering from Lewy body dementia who begins to hallucinate a giant, causing strain in his loving relationship with his transgender granddaughter Kaye (Kinley Mochrie).

The film was written by Debra McGrath, based in part on her own father's struggles with dementia. She also appears in the film as Junior's daughter and Kaye's mother Dale, with the supporting cast including Ardon Bess, Thom Allison, Al Maini and Savannah Burton.

The film premiered at the 2022 Female Eye Film Festival. It was subsequently screened at the 2023 Canadian Film Festival, and the 2023 Muskoka Queer Film Festival.

Peterson won the award for Best Performance in a Short Film at CFF, and the ACTRA Award for Outstanding Performance, Male or Gender Non-Conforming.
