= You've Got a Friend (TV program) =

- Created by: Jason Goldberg; Ashton Kutcher; Jeff Fisher
- Starring: Joe Hursley; Crista Flanagan; Lisa Cohen; Steve Markle
- Narrated by: Ashton Kutcher
- Countries of origin: United States; United Kingdom
- Original language: English
- No. of seasons: 1
- No. of episodes: 8

Production
- Executive producers: Jason Goldberg; Ashton Kutcher; Jason Stuffings; David R. Franzke; Billy Rainey; Lois Clark Curren; Rod Aissa
- Production companies: Tiger Aspect Productions; Katalyst Media; MTV Music & Series Development

Original release
- Network: MTV
- Release: October 24 – December 12, 2004

You've Got A Friend is a 2004 reality comedy program on MTV, produced by Ashton Kutcher, Jason Goldberg, and Jeff Fisher. It was launched near the same time as their reality prank show Punk'd, and although successful in ratings, was cancelled at the end of the first season so they could focus on its more popular counterpart.

The program filmed contestants having to tolerate a 'friend' for 48 hours, while filmed on hidden camera in their home and different public settings. The 'friend' would be a trained improvisational comedian, who would progressively torment the contestant, their friends and loved ones. The catch was that the friends and family of the contestant were unaware of the folie à deux. If able to endure the embarrassment caused by the irreverent demands of the friend, the contestant would win a cash prize.

== Reality comedy premise ==
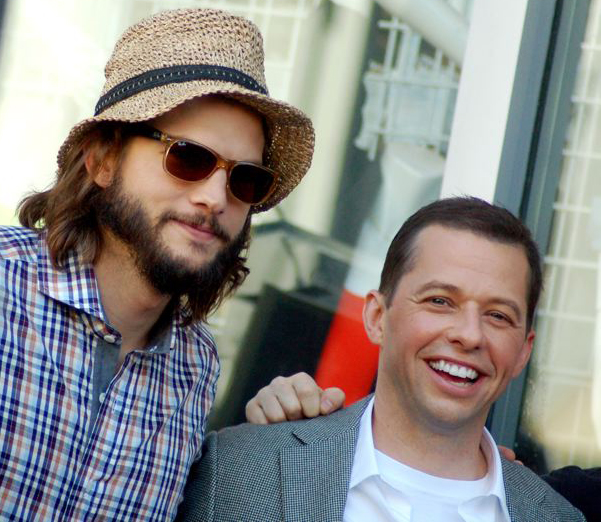
Ashton Kutcher produced You've Got a Friend at the same time as his hit reality show Punk'd

The program filmed contestants interacting with friends and loved ones, with only the contestants aware they were on a television show. To win, the contestant had to convince friends and family over 48 hours that a trained improvisational comedian was their new 'best friend.'

The contestant would not know the identity of the actor ahead of time, but only meet him while having a meal with friends at a restaurant. They would know the game had begun when the actor entered the dining area and said the phrase: "Hello, stranger!"

The actor would then slowly but relentlessly torment the contestant, acting bizarre, and asking them to commit irreverent acts to prove their friendship, to the chagrin and concern of their real friends and family.

Examples included the 'friend' demanding contestants shave their heads and eyebrows, break up with their girlfriends or boyfriends, or arrange meetings with loved ones to tell them the contestant was moving to Hollywood to start a new life with the 'friend'. The actor would even cause contestants to lose their actual jobs.

The premise was to embarrass the contestant and progressively disrupt their personal lives as the program continued. At the end of 48 hours, if the contestant followed all direction and proved their friendship, they would receive a cash prize of $15,000.

== Improvisational comedians ==
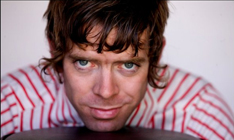
Joe Hursley played the 'friend' for a number of episodes

Notable among actors playing the 'friend' on the program was a young Crista Flanagan, before her time on Mad TV and Mad Men. Joe Hursley also played the 'friend' for several episodes, becoming progressively more sinister as the program progressed. He later worked with Kutcher on Punk'd, and was lead singer for The Ringers before moving on to the Indians.
