= Gold Bars: Who the Fuck Is Uncle Ludwig? =

- Directed by: Billie Mintz
- Written by: Billie Mintz
- Produced by: Billie Mintz; Danny Webber
- Starring: Glenn Feldman
- Cinematography: Zach Silverstein
- Edited by: Andrew Cromey; Michele Francis
- Music by: Lydia Ainsworth
- Production companies: Innov8r; Artifact Enterprises
- Release date: January 23, 2025
- Running time: 88 minutes
- Country: Canada
- Language: English

Gold Bars: Who the Fuck Is Uncle Ludwig? is a Canadian documentary film, directed by Billie Mintz and released in 2025. The film profiles Glenn Feldman, a Montreal lawyer who is convinced that his former friend and business partner Irwin Lande's family wealth was acquired from Nazi gold stolen by Lande's uncle Ludwig Delphiner. Feldman's estranged daughter reluctantly joins her father's investigation of the claim as well, but begins to notice and highlight the increasing inconsistencies and implausibilities in his story.

Lande was discussed, but not named, in the film due to an ongoing libel lawsuit, which was later resolved in Lande's favour in October 2025, with Feldman being ordered to pay Lande CA$1 million in damages.

The film premiered at the Miami Jewish Film Festival in January 2025, and had its Canadian premiere in March at the Canadian Film Festival, but was distributed primarily on television with a broadcast on Documentary and streaming on CBC Gem.

== Awards ==
At the Canadian Film Festival, the film won the award for Best Documentary.

The film received a Canadian Screen Award nomination for Best Documentary Program at the 14th Canadian Screen Awards in 2026.
