= Razzberry Jazzberry Jam =

Canadian animated preschool musical series (2008-2012)

- Also known as: RJJ
- Created by: Mike Kasprow
- Developed by: David Dias; Elliott Smith; Mike Kasprow (concept)
- Directed by: Campbell MacKinlay
- Voices of: Cle Bennett; Christine Hamilton; Maurice Dean Wint; Nicole Stamp; Jenna Andrews; Steve Markle; Jeff Kassel
- Composer: Jon Levine
- Country of origin: Canada
- Original language: English
- No. of seasons: 2
- No. of episodes: 26

Production
- Executive producer: Michael Kasprow
- Producer: Brian Sharp
- Production locations: Charlottetown, Prince Edward Island
- Production company: Trapeze Animation

Original release
- Network: CBC Television
- Release: December 23, 2008 – March 23, 2012

Razzberry Jazzberry Jam is a Canadian animated/live action preschool musical television series aired on the Canadian Broadcasting Corporation on December 23, 2008. This series is about music. All the characters are anthropomorphic musical instruments. In each episode, a special guest arrives at "The House of Jam" and the band learn about that guest (instrument) and a new song that features that instrument. Each episode also has two live action components where children learn about musical concepts with real musicians and real instruments. The animation is done with Macromedia Flash 8.

== Characters ==
- Louis the Trumpet (voiced by Clé Bennett.) He is the charismatic showman leader of the Jazzberries, who has been a part of the band since its creation, along with R.C. and former Jazzberry Annie the Voice. Louis is an understanding and kind leader, but can also be impulsive. He is named for Louis Armstrong.
- Ella the Piano (voiced by Christine Hamilton.) Ella is the largest instrument and the only Jazzberry who moves around on wheels, which makes her self-conscious at times, though this does not bother the band. The kindest and sweetest member of the band, Ella is passionate about music and the House of Jam. She's named for Ella Fitzgerald.
- Billie the Guitar (voiced by Nicole Stamp and sung by Jenna Andrews.) The daughter of musician Elmore the Guitar, Billie is a diva, who is very much aware of her talent and is a huge perfectionist as a result. Her impulsive and often competitive personality butts heads with the other instruments often. She's named for Billie Holiday.
- R.C. the Double bass (voiced by Maurice Dean Wint.) A fellow founding member of the Jazzberries, alongside Louis. R.C. is very calm and oftentimes quiet, but whenever he talks, the other Jazzberries listen. He's much more serious about his music compared to the other members, as shown when he preferred to dress fancy instead of in a costume for their performance in the episode "Phantom of the Jam." His initials stand for Ray Charles.
- Buddy and Krupa the drums (voiced by Steve Markle and Jeff Kassel respectively.) Buddy is happy, sweet, innocent, friendly, and peppy, while Krupa is moody, sassy, and pessimistic. The drums often wish they were independent of each other, but the two genuinely have kind intentions—Buddy believes everybody deserves praise and Krupa's perfectionism stems from a desire for everyone to be talented. Buddy's named for Buddy Rich while Krupa is named for Gene Krupa.

== Reception ==
Razzberry Jazzberry Jam received positive reviews.

Joyce Slaton of Common Sense Media rated the show three stars out of five, saying it "gentle, inclusive, and filled with both musical references and actual songs in a variety of genres, this animated show is best for preschoolers, particularly those with an interest in music."
