= Dan Abramovici =

Canadian actor, writer, and director

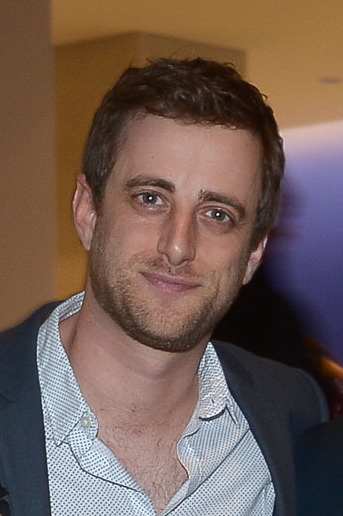
- Dan Abramovici (2016/2017)
- Occupations: Actor, writer, director
- Years active: 2008–present
- Website: https://www.danabramovici.com

Dan Abramovici is a Canadian actor, writer, and director.

== Career ==
Abramovici began his career as an actor before moving into writing and directing. After graduating from the Canadian Film Centre's acting school, Abramovici attracted some acclaim for the film Ben's at Home, which he starred in and also co-wrote. The Toronto Star called the film "a simple charmer," while The Georgia Straight called it an "unlikely festival hit" that is "sharply written and played." The film was shot in August 2013 on a budget of just $20,000, half funded by Horodyski and Abramovici and half by a crowdfunding campaign on Indiegogo. The film premiered in April 2014 at the WorldFest-Houston International Film Festival. It had its Canadian premiere at the Montreal World Film Festival. It won the award for Best Feature Film at the 2014 Rhode Island International Film Festival, and the award for Best Feature Film at the 2015 Canadian Film Festival. Abaramovici also won the award for Best Actor at the Indie Fest in 2014. It was released theatrically in Canada in 2015.

Abramovici has directed several short films since 2012. In 2021, he directed the short film Play It Again. In 2025, he wrote and directed a short film starring Chloe Van Landschoot, which premiered at the 29th Fantasia International Film Festival.

He is slated to star in the forthcoming independent feature film The Fallers directed by Will Bowes, and his feature film directorial debut, an adaptation of his 2021 short film Play It Again, will be released in 2026.
