= Kim Albright =

Canadian film director

Kim Albright is a Canadian film director based in Vancouver, British Columbia, whose debut feature film With Love and a Major Organ was released in 2023.

Originally from Westmount, Quebec, she was educated at McGill University and in Edinburgh, remaining in the United Kingdom for most of the 2000s and 2010s as a director of commercials and music videos before returning to Canada in 2017. In her early career she also directed a number of short films, including Dragonfly (2007), Edward's Turmoil (2009), Albatross (2010), The Purple Plain (2016), The Director (2018) and Bring Out Your Dead (2019).

She did a residency at the Canadian Film Centre in 2018, during which she met playwright Julia Lederer and began to collaborate on a film adaptation of Lederer's stage play With Love and a Major Organ. In 2020 she won two awards from Women in the Directors Chair for the screenplay treatment.

The film went into production in early 2022, and premiered in March 2023 at the South by Southwest festival, followed by its Canadian premiere in July at the Fantasia Film Festival.

The film was named to the initial longlist for the 2023 Jean-Marc Vallée DGC Discovery Award, and won awards for Best Film at the 2023 Reelworld Film Festival, and the 2024 Canadian Film Festival.
