= The Dancing Dogs of Dombrova =

2018 Canadian drama film

- Directed by: Zack Bernbaum
- Written by: Michael Whatling
- Produced by: Zack Bernbaum; Stephen Chandler Whitehead; Adrian Moldovan
- Starring: Katherine Fogler; Douglas Nyback
- Cinematography: Stephen Chandler Whitehead
- Edited by: Jane MacRae
- Music by: Erica Procunier
- Production company: Ezeqial Productions
- Distributed by: Film Movement
- Release date: October 27, 2018 (Austin)
- Running time: 102 minutes
- Country: Canada
- Languages: English; Polish

The Dancing Dogs of Dombrova is a Canadian comedy-drama film, directed by Zack Bernbaum and released in 2018. The film stars Katherine Fogler and Douglas Nyback as Sarah and Aaron Cotler, Jewish Canadian siblings who are travelling together to their grandmother's hometown of Dąbrowa Górnicza, Poland, to fulfill her dying wish of being reunited with the cremated remains of her dead childhood dog.

The cast also includes Doroftei Anis, Silva Helena Schmidt, Stefan Vizireanu, Adrian Matioc, Marius Stanescu, Dana Talos, Alexandra Murarus, Boris Melinti, Pali Vecsei, Vlad Robas, Ciprian Scurtea, Valentin Spaeth, Liviu Vlad and Alina Lipovetchi.

== Production ==
Bernbaum acknowledged that the film was inspired by aspects of his own real family life, including drawing from his own relationship with his sister, choosing Dąbrowa Górnicza as the setting because that was his own grandmother's real hometown, and basing its title on his grandmother once saying that his sister's dog was dancing when it jumped up and down excitedly at a family gathering, but stated that the film was not meant to be understood as autobiographical.

Despite being set in Poland, the film was shot principally in Romania, as coproducer and cinematographer Stephen Chandler Whitehead had established professional connections there from prior work.

== Distribution ==
The film premiered on October 27, 2018, at the Austin Film Festival, and had its Canadian premiere in the Borsos Competition program at the 2018 Whistler Film Festival.

== Critical response ==
Amy Longsdorf of the USA Today syndication service wrote that "it takes a while for the picture to get going as filmmaker Zach Bernbaum struggles to get the sad/funny balance just right. But once Sarah and Aaron begin dissecting their complicated relationship, 'Dancing Dogs' finds its groove, allowing audiences to eavesdrop on the secret places in the characters' lives."

== Awards ==
It was screened at the 2019 Canadian Film Festival, where the film won the award for Best Feature Film and Bernbaum won for Best Director.

Courtney Small of Cinema Axis wrote that the film "is a crowd-pleaser filled with wit and genuine emotion. You will love these characters flaws and all."
