= Shoot to Marry =

2020 Canadian documentary film

- Film poster
- Directed by: Steve Markle
- Written by: Steve Markle
- Produced by: Steve Markle
- Edited by: Steve Markle
- Distributed by: Gravitas Ventures
- Release date: January 26, 2020 (Slamdance)
- Running time: 74 minutes
- Country: Canada
- Language: English

Shoot to Marry is a 2020 Canadian documentary film, directed by Steve Markle. The film centres on Markle's interviews with women he has called under the pretext of making a documentary film about "interesting women", but in fact with the goal of meeting a new woman to date and marry after breaking up with his longtime girlfriend. Ultimately, Markle learns from each of the women and undergoes a personal evolution.

The film premiered at the 2020 Slamdance Film Festival, where it won the Best of Breakouts Audience Award. It had its Canadian premiere at the 2020 Canadian Film Festival, where it won the award for Best Feature.

== Critical response ==
On the review aggregator Rotten Tomatoes, the film has a 76% approval rating, based on 17 reviews.

Kim Hughes of Original Cin writes “Brutally candid and frequently hilarious, indie filmmaker Steve Markle’s documentary Shoot to Marry, about his novel search for everlasting love — or more specifically, his search for marriage which may or may not be everlasting — is a balm for the broken-hearted and a great diversion with unexpected gravitas in its conclusion. It’s also a cautionary tale about expectations and how we pile them on ourselves at our peril. What follows is equal parts quest and catharsis.”

John Doyle of The Globe and Mail reviewed the film and writes: “It shouldn’t work, but it does and exudes an uncanny charm that makes it highly, perversely enjoyable.” He concluded that “What should be an off-putting premise is nothing of the sort; Markle’s sad-sack act is really just an excuse for an observational doc that illuminates how terribly ordinary and a little lonely most people are."

Film writer Raquel Stecher of Quelle Movies writes, "Shoot to Marry is a heartfelt documentary that is equal parts introspective, quirky, funny, sad and joyful. Usually in a review like this I would refer to the filmmaker by his or her last name. But this is such an intimate documentary that in a weird way I felt like I really got to know Steve and through his film I made a new friend. I found myself rooting for him from the very beginning and even felt second hand embarrassment at his failures and sheer joy at his accomplishments. Steve is genuine and funny.”

Critic Allen Adams of The Maine Edge writes of Markle “And there’s something to be said for the evolution he himself undergoes along the way; even as the rejections mount, he learns about what it takes to be a good partner. Each of these women teaches him something real; they bring forth their respective passions and allow him to view the world through the lenses they provide.”

The UK film critic Musanna Ahmed writes in Film Inquiry “Markle provides lots of laughs. With this delightful film, a real-life rom-com, he proves to be a natural storyteller with a gift for finding comedy in every moment. It’s a lightweight premise with heavyweight emotions, underscored by a very effective soundtrack which mixes 90’s rom-com nostalgia with a catchy leitmotif that signals a new start (which happens a lot) in his path to a blessed union.”

Writing for Film Threat, Chris Salce stated that "when watching Shoot To Marry, I kept asking questions that, oddly enough, Markle also brings up. He questions if his tactic of finding women to be in his documentary while also trying to date them is ethical. He does ask for permission to record their dates, but it just seems like a bizarre request. Markle even compares what he’s doing to a “casting couch.” If you don’t know what that is, Google it with the safe search on as NSFW material may come up. I also noticed that he was attracted to just about every woman he interviewed and wanted to date them all. It comes across as weird and creepy."

For Point of View, Pat Mullen wrote that "Shoot to Marry might have seemed like a great idea in 2015, but despite Markle’s best efforts to make himself the punchline of his own jokes, the film has a tone-deaf representation of women. Markle acknowledges that his conceit is problematic, and that trying to score a wife by making a documentary about dating isn’t entirely fair to the women who consent to sharing the views about the subject. The interviewees genuinely seem surprised when Markle either goes in for a kiss or asks them for a date before the interviews abruptly end. With all that has happened in the years since Markle began production, Shoot to Marry might have benefitted from a bit more little soul-searching about the women in the film. In a post-#MeToo environment, one has to read the room."

Chris Luciantonio of Film Pulse wrote that the film "takes on a distinct incel vibe that taints all the awkward comedic moments with antipathy", but wrote that "however, the trouble with condemning this film hinges, as most documentaries do, on its claim to be reality, and Shoot to Marry’s claims are tenuous at best. By nature all documentaries consist of some editorializing and construction to achieve their verisimilitude, but Markle’s film seems to overtly do so. Mockumentary might be a better distinction, as one too many of his interviews end with a whacky comedic moment that a bad comedian like Markle would write. A blind date ends with her confessing her coprophagia fetish; a grade-school crush has a rant about how she blames her husband for their autistic son; a journey to a sex club sees him mostly talking to other dejected men. All of these are limp punchlines to jokes he forgot to deliver, but Markle tries to maintain an air of reality to his inane experiment that’s more insulting than it is creative."
