= Steve Markle =

Canadian filmmaker

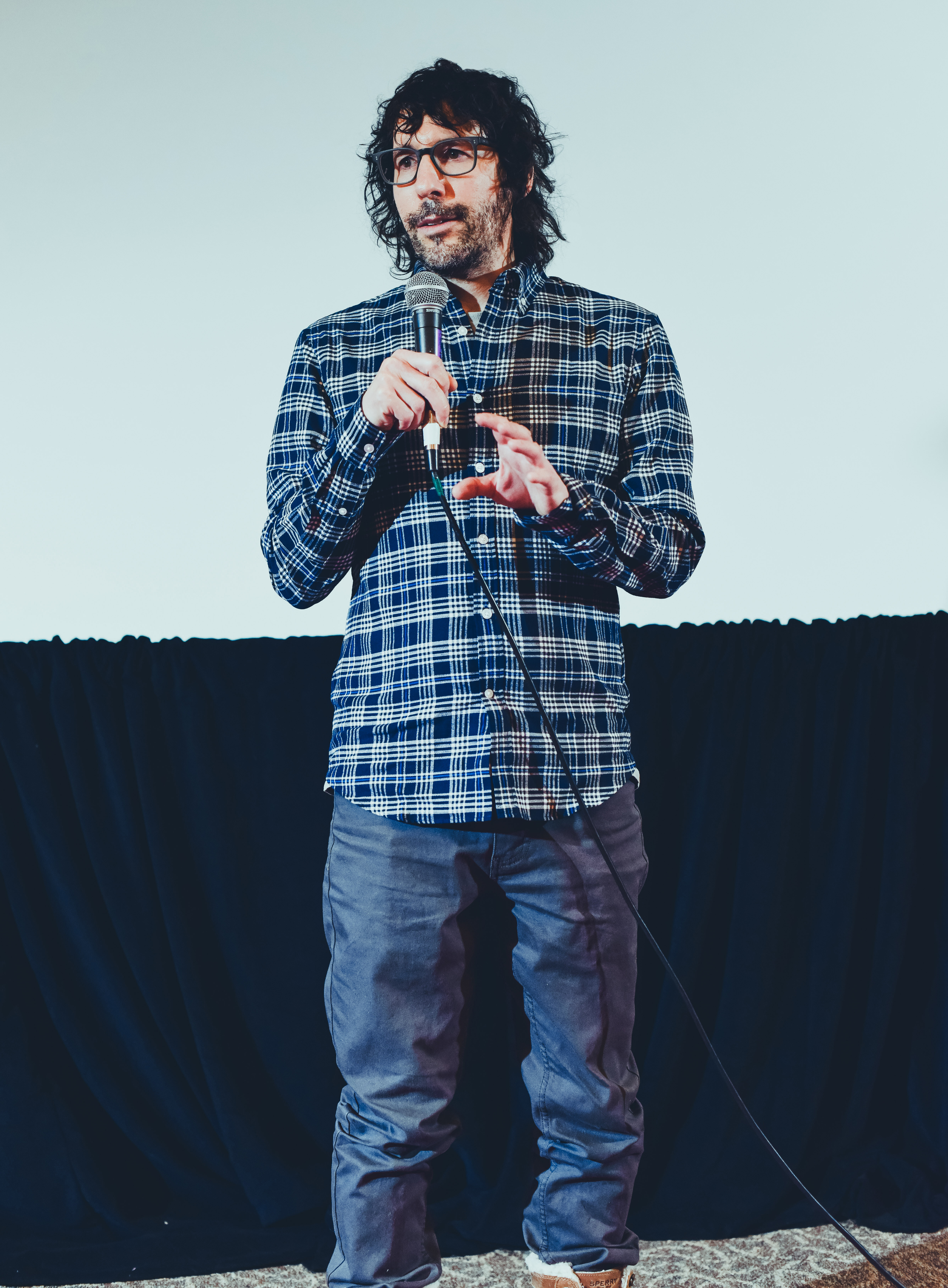

Steve Markle is a Canadian filmmaker, actor, writer, editor and producer best known for Shoot To Marry (2020), Testees (2008), and Camp Hollywood (2004).

Markle won a Gemini Award for his documentary Camp Hollywood in 2005, and won the Slamdance Film Festival Audience Award for Breakout Features for his documentary Shoot To Marry in 2020.

== Early life and education ==
Markle was born and raised in Toronto, Ontario. His father, Jack Markle, and uncle, Sam Markle, are pioneers of neon art. They created the iconic three-story neon record for Sam The Record Man and ran The Electric Gallery in Yorkville from 1970 to 1979.

In 1993, Markle graduated from Ryerson University as recipient of the Norman Jewison Filmmaking Award.

== Career ==
Markle directed TV commercials and music videos before taking a creative director position at Showcase, a Canadian TV network, in 1997. That same year, Markle ran for Mayor of Toronto in the 1997 Toronto municipal election promising origami parking tickets, and magical elves to handle road construction. Markle received 1,244 votes.

In 2003, Markle moved to Los Angeles. He performed at The Hollywood Improv and filmed comedy videos at the Playboy Mansion and the MTV Video Music Awards before taking the starring role in You’ve Got A Friend, a hidden camera show produced by Ashton Kutcher for MTV in 2004.

=== Camp Hollywood ===
In 2004, Markle wrote, directed, edited and produced the documentary Camp Hollywood which had its American broadcast premiere on Sundance TV. Camp Hollywood won a Gemini Award in Canada where it aired on IFC and CBC Television. Camp Hollywood follows aspiring actors, comedians and musicians residing at the Highland Gardens hotel, in Los Angeles, then a seedy hotel living on past associations with The Rat Pack, Janis Joplin and other rock stars. The documentary, which sees Markle trying to live at the hotel for 60 days in order to become a stand-up star, is considered a cult classic and features cameos by Mark Margolis and Malin Åkerman.

=== Testees ===
In 2008, Markle starred in the FX comedy series Testees. Markle plays a slacker who works as a human guinea pig. Testees aired on FX in the U.S., the TV network Showcase in Canada, and on Comedy Central in Germany, Austria and the Netherlands.

=== Shoot To Marry ===
In 2020, Markle’s documentary Shoot To Marry had its world premiere at the Slamdance Film Festival winning the Audience Award for Breakout Features. Shoot To Marry had its European premiere at the Raindance Film Festival and its Canadian premiere at the Canadian Film Festival where it won the award for Best Feature. Written, directed, edited and produced by Markle, the documentary follows the filmmaker, heartbroken from a failed Christmas proposal, as he films interesting women on a search for enlightenment and love.

Shoot To Marry was released by Gravitas Ventures in the U.S. and by Northern Banner Releasing in Canada where it premiered on Super Channel.

== Selected awards and nominations ==
- 2005 Gemini Award for Best Performing Arts Program or Series or Arts Documentary Program or Series: Camp Hollywood (2004)
- 2005 nomination, Gemini Award for Best Writing in a Documentary Program or Series: Camp Hollywood (2004)
- 2009 nomination, Canadian Screen Award for Best Comedy Series: Testees (2008)
- 2020 Slamdance Film Festival Audience Award for Breakout Features: Shoot To Marry
- 2020 Canadian Film Festival Award for Best Feature: Shoot To Marry

== Selected filmography ==
- Camp Hollywood (2004) (Writer/Director/Editor/Producer)
- Shoot To Marry (2020) (Writer/Director/Editor/Producer)

== Television ==
- You’ve Got A Friend (2004) (Actor)
- Testees (2008) (Actor)
- Razzberry Jazzberry Jam (2008-2011) (Actor)
- Kenny vs. Spenny Christmas Special (2010) (Actor)
- Breakout Kings (2011) (Actor)
