= Zack Bernbaum =

Canadian film director

- Occupation: film director

Zack Bernbaum is a Canadian film director from Toronto, Ontario.

A graduate of the film studies program at Ryerson University, he founded his own production company, Ezeqial Productions, early in his career. He named the company for his Hebrew name, Yechezkel (Ezekiel), but opted to change the spelling for artistic reasons as he did not want his films to be perceived as religiously themed.

He directed his feature debut, And Now a Word from Our Sponsor, in 2013, and followed up in 2015 with Cold Deck.

In 2018 he released The Dancing Dogs of Dombrova, which won the awards for Best Film and Best Director at the 2019 Canadian Film Festival.

He has also directed the short films So Soon Forgotten (2009), Captive Love (2016) and The Announcement (2020).

As of 2020, he had two future film projects, Cut for Stone and (An)other, in development.
