= Ben's at Home =

- Poster
- Directed by: Mars Horodyski
- Written by: Mars Horodyski; Dan Abramovici
- Produced by: Mars Horodyski; Dan Abramovici; Anneli Ekborn
- Starring: Dan Abramovici; Jessica Embro
- Cinematography: Walter Pacifico
- Edited by: Mike Reisacher
- Production companies: Awkward Silence Productions; Cinemars Productions; Sabeth Productions
- Distributed by: Pacific Northwest Pictures
- Release date: April 11, 2014 (WorldFest)
- Running time: 70 minutes
- Country: Canada
- Language: English
- Budget: $20,000

Ben's at Home is a 2014 Canadian romantic comedy film, directed by Mars Horodyski. The film stars Dan Abramovici as Ben, a man who responds to an emotional breakup on the eve of his 30th birthday by rearranging his life so that he will never have to leave his apartment again, only to have his desire to live as a hermit challenged when he and Jess (Jessica Embro), a regular driver for his food delivery service, develop a romantic interest in each other.

The cast also includes Jim Annan, Rob Baker, Craig Brown and Inessa Frantowski.

The film was shot in August 2013 on a budget of just $20,000, half funded by Horodyski and Abramovici and half by a crowdfunding campaign on Indiegogo.

The film premiered in April 2014 at the WorldFest-Houston International Film Festival. It had its Canadian premiere at the Montreal World Film Festival.

== Awards ==
At Houston, the film won the award for Best Comedy Feature.

It won the award for Best Feature Film at the 2014 Rhode Island International Film Festival, and the award for Best Feature Film at the 2015 Canadian Film Festival.

Horodyski won the Canadian Comedy Award for Best Direction in a Film at the 16th Canadian Comedy Awards.
