= With Love and a Major Organ =

2023 Canadian drama film

- Film poster
- Directed by: Kim Albright
- Written by: Julia Lederer
- Produced by: Madeleine Davis
- Starring: Anna Maguire; Hamza Haq
- Cinematography: Leonardo Harim
- Edited by: Tony Zhou
- Music by: Jeremy Wallace Maclean
- Production companies: Common Knowledge Films; Virtual Insurance Films
- Release date: March 12, 2023 (SXSW)
- Running time: 91 minutes
- Country: Canada
- Language: English

With Love and a Major Organ is a 2023 Canadian fantasy drama film, directed by Kim Albright, and starring Anna Maguire and Hamza Haq.

Based on a stage play by Julia Lederer, the film is set in an alternate reality in which all human individuality and emotion has been suppressed by technological mediation; life decisions like careers and relationships are mediated by a computer application called LifeZap rather than personal passions, emotions are explored only in facilities that resemble escape rooms, and even the heart itself is simply a physical object that can be removed from a person's chest.

The cast includes Veena Sood, Donna Benedicto, Arghavan Jenati, Laara Sadiq, Ryan Beil, Kerën Burkett, Enid-Raye Adams, Miho Suzuki, Ken Godmere, Linda Pollard, Jennifer Copping, Michael Daingerfield, Lynda Boyd, Calix Fraser and William Vaughan.

== Plot ==
Anabel (Anna Maguire), an artist who is one of the few remaining people who still experience a world of individuality and emotion, falls in love with George (Hamza Haq), a man who is part of the dominant paradigm and who rejects her because LifeZap has not selected her for him. Heartbroken, Anabel removes her heart so that she can finally blend into the norm, and sends it to George, who places it in his own chest and begins to experience genuine emotion and individuality for the first time in his life.

== Production and distribution ==
Albright did a residency at the Canadian Film Centre in 2018, during which she met Lederer and began to collaborate on a film adaptation of Lederer's stage play. In 2020 she won two awards from Women in the Directors Chair for the screenplay treatment.

The film went into production in BC in early 2022.

The film premiered in March 2023 at the South by Southwest festival, and had its Canadian premiere in July at the Fantasia Film Festival.

== Critical response ==
On the review aggregator website Rotten Tomatoes, 87% of 23 critics' reviews are positive, with an average rating of 6.9/10.

Rachel Ho of Exclaim! praised Maguire and Haq for their performances, writing that "the flip between Anabel and George notably does not simply elicit a one-to-one switch in Maguire and Haq's performances. Refreshingly, both play their characters' newfound perspectives in different registers that go beyond a typical personality swap." She further stated that "With Love and a Major Organ has moments of fantastical surrealism, including a whimsical dance sequence that is reminiscent of a bygone era of film, as well as the premise that hearts are inanimate objects that can be removed and replaced. Albright grounds each of these elements with a down-to-earth production quality that grants audiences the ability to suspend disbelief easily, which is further aided by a humorous script by Julia Lederer."

Courtney Small of That Shelf wrote that "Albright crafts the type of wildly original debut that immediately makes her a director who should be on everyone’s radar. With Love and a Major Organ will have you laughing one moment and contemplating the nature of human connections the next. By setting the film in a world that feels close to our own, but strange enough to keep one constantly off balance, Albright brings interesting layers to her characters and the situation in which they find themselves."

For RogerEbert.com, Nick Allen wrote that "'With Love and a Major Organ' is bold in many ways, including how it manages to present its mundane world with tact and spirit. Albright’s direction always aims for the compelling and pleasing but non-showy, like when a bachelorette party falls apart with Anna at the center, executed in one smoothly coordinated shot. Maguire’s performance fluctuates between funny and tragic, but her work is so natural. This movie has so much wisdom, and it comes from Albright and her inspired team as if it were intuition."

John Fink of The Film Stage was more mixed, writing that "what the film gets right in its tone is that liminal space of being lonely in a big city, technology is meant to disrupt and solve every problem except those of the heart. While I admit I have never seen Lederer’s play performed, this adaptation is a rendition too awkward for cinematic shape. In the theater much is left to the imagination––a table with a few chairs against a black curtain can represent any space. I imagine the charm of the play is a precise focus on performance and dialogue; it’s perhaps more interesting to have a spectator create their own image of a replacement heart than it is to see it onscreen."

== Awards ==
The film was named to the initial longlist for the 2023 Jean-Marc Vallée DGC Discovery Award.

It won the awards for Outstanding Feature Film, Outstanding Feature Actor (Haq) and Outstanding Feature Cinematographer (Leo Harim) at the 2023 Reelworld Film Festival, and the award for Best Feature Film at the 2024 Canadian Film Festival.
