= Canadian Film Festival =

Annual film fest in Toronto, Ontario

Canadian Film Fest
- Location: Toronto, Ontario, Canada
- Founded: 2004
- Language: English
- Website: www.canfilmfest.ca

The Canadian Film Fest, formerly known as the Canadian Filmmakers Festival, is an annual film festival in Toronto, Ontario. Showcasing a program of Canadian independent films, it is held in March of each year and usually runs for five days.

The festival was launched in 2004, and ran annually until 2008 at the Royal Cinema. Although not staged between 2009 and 2011, it was relaunched in 2012 and has run annually since. The festival has been staged at the Scotiabank Theatre since 2017.

The festival was formed in association with the Toronto International Film Festival Group, but operates independently of TIFF. It serves commonly, but not exclusively, as the Toronto premiere venue for films which premiered elsewhere on the Canadian or international film festival circuits in the previous year but have not yet screened in Toronto, although it also serves as the premiere venue for some films.

The 2020 festival was cancelled due to the COVID-19 pandemic in Canada; instead, the organizers partnered with the pay TV service Super Channel to provide television and streaming broadcasts of the films that had been slated to screen at the festival. With the pandemic continuing into 2021, festival organizers again partnered with Super Channel to present the 2021 edition of the festival under the same model.

== Award for Best Feature Film ==
Year	Film	Director	Ref
2004	Expiration	Gavin Heffernan	
2005	The Overlookers	Christopher Warre Smets	
2006	The End of Silence	Anita Doron	
2007	The Zero Sum	Raphael Assaf	
2008	The Last Hit Man	Christopher Warre Smets	
2012	A Little Bit Zombie	Casey Walker	
2013	The Storm Within (Rouge sang)	Martin Doepner	
2014	Patch Town	Craig Goodwill	
2015	Ben's at Home	Mars Horodyski	
2016	How to Plan an Orgy in a Small Town	Jeremy Lalonde	
2017	Great Great Great	Adam Garnet Jones	
2018	The Drawer Boy	Arturo Pérez Torres	
2019	The Dancing Dogs of Dombrova	Zack Bernbaum	
2020	Shoot to Marry	Steve Markle	
2021	Sugar Daddy	Wendy Morgan	
2022	Carmen	Valerie Buhagiar	
2023	Babysitter	Monia Chokri	
2024	With Love and a Major Organ	Kim Albright	
2025	Darkest Miriam	Naomi Jaye	
2026	Akashi	Mayumi Yoshida	

== Films ==
=== 2014 ===
==== Features ====
- Afterparty — Michelle Ouellet
- The Birder — Ted Bezaire
- H & G — Danishka Esterhazy
- Patch Town — Craig Goodwill
- Play the Film — Alec Toller
- The Privileged — Leah Walker

==== Shorts ====
- Bastards — Jeremy LaLonde
- De Puta Madre: A Love Story — Catherine Black
- Ephemeral — Rebecca Davis
- The Golden Ticket — Patrick Hagarty
- Gumshoes — Reese Eveneshen
- Kate — Illya Klymkiw
- The Last Supper — Jonathan Eagan
- Margaret Finds Her Mojo — Brett Heard
- My Old Man — Ryan M. Andrews
- Peter and Jane Know Some of the Same People — Chris Remerowski
- The Prince — Francesco Giannini
- Snapshots — Brian Stockton
- Survival Guide — Phil Connell
- Uncommon Enemies — Alex Hatz

=== 2015 ===
==== Features ====
- Barn Wedding — Shaun Benson
- Ben's at Home — Mars Horodyski
- The Cocksure Lads Movie — Murray Foster
- Late Night Double Feature — Navin Ramaswaran, Zach Ramelan, Torin Langen
- Nocturne — Saul Pincus
- Pretend We're Kissing — Matt Sadowski
- Relative Happiness — Deanne Foley
- Shooting the Musical — Joel Ashton McCarthy

=== 2016 ===
==== Features ====
- 20 Moves — Harv Glazer
- Across the Line — Director X
- Borealis — Sean Garrity
- Dead Rush — Zach Ramelan
- How to Plan an Orgy in a Small Town — Jeremy LaLonde
- Jackie Boy — Cody Campanale
- The Sabbatical — Brian Stockton

==== Shorts ====
- Divorce Photographer — Christine Buijs
- Dude, Where's My Ferret? — Alison Parker
- Duty Calls — Jackie English
- The Floaters — Nick Wilson
- Flung — Christopher Warre Smets
- The Girl Next Door — Peter Mabrucco
- Julia Julep — Alana Cymerman
- Keystone — Ian Foster
- Looking for Today — Dylan Rayne Fitzgerald
- Onto Us — Natty Zavitz
- Pit — Jonathan Steckley
- Shavasana — Ian Macmillan
- Static — Tanya Lemke
- Synapse Dance — Karen Suzuki
- Winter Hymns — Dusty Mancinelli
- Worst.Day.Ever. — Adam Goldhammer

=== 2017 ===
==== Features ====
- An American Dream: The Education of William Bowman — Ken Finkleman
- Badsville — April Mullen
- Broken — Lynne Spencer
- Broken Mile — Justin McConnell
- Edging — Natty Zavitz
- Filth City — Andy King
- Great Great Great — Adam Garnet Jones
- The Heretics — Chad Archibald
- Lost Solace — Chris Scheuerman
- Modern Classic — J.M.B. Hunter

==== Shorts ====
- A.O.K. — Aris Athanasopoulos
- The Bakebook — Suri Parmar
- The Cameraman — Connor Gaston
- Come Back — Hannah Anderson, Aidan Shipley
- Companionship — Zachary Ramelan, Alex Loubert
- Farm Is a Four-Letter Word — Ryan Couldrey
- Grocery Store Action Movie — Matthew Campbell
- I Love You So Much It's Killing Them — Joel Ashton McCarthy
- Magic Mushrooms — Sean Wainsteim
- Milk — Winnifred Jong
- Parent, Teacher — Roman Tchjen
- Rainfall — Efehan Elbi
- She Came Knocking — John Ainslie
- Sleeping In — Denis Dulude
- Sunny Side Up — Caitlin Dosa
- Time Out — Navin Ramaswaran
- Tuesday, 10:08 a.m. — Thomas Pepper, Jane Tattersall
- Ways to Water — Kit Weyman
- Welcome Stranger — Brit Kewin

=== 2018 ===
==== Features ====
- Becoming Burlesque — Jackie English
- The Cannon — Marshall Axani
- The Drawer Boy — Arturo Pérez Torres, Aviva Armour-Ostroff
- The Go-Getters — Jeremy LaLonde
- Love Jacked — Alfons Adetuyi
- Luba — Caley Wilson
- Ordinary Days — Kris Booth, Renuka Jeyapalan, Jordan Canning
- Prodigals — Michelle Ouellet
- Room for Rent — Matthew Atkinson
- A Swinger's Weekend — Jon E. Cohen

==== Shorts ====
- As Long As It Takes (Le temps qu'il faut) — Abeille Tard
- Before the Day — Paul McGillion
- Breathing Through a Straw — Leigh Rivenbark
- Cancel the Fucking Internet — Ryan Kayet
- The Catch — Holly Brace-Lavoie
- C.P.R. — Clara Altimas
- Dinette — Christopher Lazar
- Emmy — Hannah Cheesman
- Friends on Facebook — Chris Ross
- Game — Joy Webster
- Good Hands — Lauren Vandenbrook
- I Love You More — Kevin Hartford
- The Last Goodbye — James Benda
- Martin's Hagge — Penny Eizenga
- Must Kill Karl — Joe Kicak
- Newborn — Ray Savaya
- Prom Night — Samantha MacAdam
- Purl — Ian Macmillan
- Slap Happy — Madeleine Sims-Fewer, Dusty Mancinelli
- The Things You Think I'm Thinking — Sherren Lee

=== 2019 ===
==== Features ====
- Creep Nation — John Geddes
- The Dancing Dogs of Dombrova — Zack Bernbaum
- Honey Bee — Rama Rau
- Nose to Tail — Jesse Zigelstein
- Nowhere — Thomas Michael
- Pond Life — Gord Rand
- Red Rover — Shane Belcourt
- This Is North Preston — Jaren Hayman
- Wolves Unleashed: Against All Odds — Andrew Simpson

==== Shorts ====
- Among the Soil — Francis Luta
- Be My Guest — David Jermyn
- Brave Little Army — Michelle D’Alessandro Hatt
- Case of the Massey Bodice Ripping — Karen Knox
- Christmas Green — Clara Altimas
- Claire — Spencer Ryerson
- Darkside — Erin Carter, Sam Coyle
- The Desolation Prize — Shane Day
- Dotage — Cat Hostick
- Duck Duck Goose — Shelley Thompson
- Engaged to be Engaged — Joseph Covello
- Hang Up! — Richard Powell
- Home in Time — Patrick Hagarty
- I Beat Up My Rapist — Katrina Saville
- Keep Coming Back — Brendan Brady
- Moon Dog — Chala Hunter
- No. 3: In the Absence of Angels — Camille Hollett-French
- One Leg In, One Leg Out — Lisa Rideout
- The Riveters — Kate Felix
- A Snake Marked — Juan Riedinger
- Screaming on the Inside — Salar Pashtoonyar
- Shuttlecock — Melanie Jones
- Spatss! — Régis Loisel
- Spooning — Rebecca Applebaum
- Take Your Mark — Scott Cavalheiro
- Terminally in Love — Emily Jenkins, Justin Black
- This Is Not a Drill — Ravi Steve
- With You Always — Angela Besharah
- Woman in Stall — Madeleine Sims-Fewer, Dusty Mancinelli

==== Awards ====
- Best Feature: The Dancing Dogs of Dombrova
- Best Short: Terminally in Love
- William F. White Reel Canadian Indie: Honey Bee
- People's Pick: Wolves Unleashed: Against All Odds
- DGC Ontario Best Director: Zack Bernbaum, The Dancing Dogs of Dombrova
- ReTake Furniture Rentals Best Set and Production Design: Terminally in Love
- Best Actor in a Feature: Aaron Abrams, Nose to Tail
- Best Actor in a Short: Krista Morin, Spooning
- Achievement in Documentary Filmmaking: Wolves Unleashed: Against All Odds
- Best Short, Honorable Mention: No. 3: In the Absence of Angels
- Harold Greenberg Script Competition: Stephen Sloot, Harold Doesn't Die

=== 2020 ===
==== Features ====
- Alone Across the Arctic — Francis Luta
- Clapboard Jungle — Justin McConnell
- The Cuban — Sergio Navarretta
- Hazy Little Thing — Sam Coyle
- A Perfect Plan — Jesse Ikeman
- Queen of the Morning Calm — Gloria Ui Young Kim
- Shoot to Marry — Steve Markle
- Volition — Tony Dean Smith

==== Shorts ====
- 8+ Weeks — Mike Mildon
- 20:12 — Kevin Champagne Lessard
- 20 Minutes to Life — Veronika Kurz
- Age of Dysphoria — Jessica Petelle
- Along the Water's Edge — Jonathan Elliott
- The Bear and the Beekeeper — Kristina Mileska
- Because One Day — Aref Mahabadi
- Blue in Hollywood — James Gangl
- Buzzard — Joy Webster
- Chubby — Madeleine Sims-Fewer, Dusty Mancinelli
- Death of the Party — Melanie Jones
- Everyone's Leaving Us — Jessie Gabe
- For the Best — Madeline Wahl
- Heart Bomb (Une bombe au cœur) — Rémi St-Michel
- Hypernova — Tate Young
- Joey — Jessica Hinkson, Laura Nordin
- Liminal — Dan Abramovici
- Plush — Anna Jane Edmonds
- Pressure Play — Eric Bizzarri
- The Red Bicycle — Fazila Amiri
- Shoegazer — Isa Benn
- Stealing from Stoners — Cameron LaPrairie, Brett Morton
- Swimmers — Chris Ross
- Tips — Mercedes Papalia
- You Too, Chuckles — Kevin Hartford

==== Unscreened ====
Several films had been planned for the festival lineup, but were not able to be screened due to the shift from physical to broadcast screening. However, the films were still screened for the jury, and remained eligible for the festival awards.

- All About Who You Know — Jake Horowitz
- Nail in the Coffin: The Fall and Rise of Vampiro — Michael Paszt
- Unidentified Woman — Katrina Saville
- You Hired a Hitman — Ravi Steve

==== Awards ====
- Best Feature - Shoot to Marry
- William F White Reel Canadian Indie - Queen of the Morning Calm
- Best Short - Liminal
- ReTAKE Best Set Design - The Bear and the Beekeeper
- DGC Ontario’s Best Director - Gloria Ui Young Kim, Queen of the Morning Calm
- Best Breakout Performance - Maya Harman, Chubby; Eponine Lee, Queen of the Morning Calm
- Editing - Nail in the Coffin
- Best New Voice - Isa Benn, Shoegazer
- Cinematography - François Messier-Rheault, Heart Bomb (Une bombe au cœur)
- Best Music - Alex Bird, Because One Day

=== 2021 ===
==== Features ====
- Between Waves — Virginia Abramovich
- Chained — Titus Heckel
- The Corruption of Divine Providence — Jeremy Torrie
- Events Transpiring Before, During and After a High School Basketball Game — Ted Stenson
- Mad Dog and the Butcher (Les Derniers vilains) — Thomas Rinfret
- Range Roads — Kyle Thomas
- Sugar Daddy — Wendy Morgan
- White Elephant — Andrew Chung
- Woman in Car — Vanya Rose

==== Shorts ====
- 1978 — Hamza Bangash
- Acting Out — Jean-Sébastien Beaudoin-Gagnon
- Ain't No Time for Women (Y'a pas d'heure pour les femmes) — Sarra El Abed
- Aniksha — Vincent Toi
- Bad Omen — Salar Pashtoonyar
- Birdie — Alexandre Lefebvre
- Breakout — Kevin Hartford
- Clothing (Les vêtements) — Caroline Blais
- Danica's Mom — Kennedy Kao
- The First Goodbye — Ali Mashayekhi
- The Flexed Arm Hang — Findlay Brown
- Girls Shouldn't Walk Alone at Night (Les filles ne marchent pas seules la nuit) — Katerine Martineau
- Goodbye Golovin — Mathieu Grimard
- Inuit Languages of the 21st Century — Ulivia Uviluk
- Just for the Record — Vojin Vasovic
- The Kall — Barbara Mamabolo
- Mister Cachemire (Monsieur Cachemire) — Iouri Philippe Paillé
- Moon (Lune) — Zoé Pelchat
- Nothing Pretty Here (Rien de beau ici) — Gabrielle Vigneault-Gendron
- Of Memory and Debris (De memoria y escombros) — Rodrigo Michelangeli
- Otanimm-Onnimm (Father/Daughter) — Neko Wong-Houle, Terrance Houle
- The Pond, at Night (L'Étang, la nuit) — Olivia Boudreau
- The Room — Sami Mermer, Houman Zolfaghari
- Roseline Like in the Movies (Roseline comme dans les films) — Sara Bourdeau
- The Sky is Blue, Katlhoum — Darani Urgessa
- The Trip — Mikizi Migona Papatie
- Wish — Ingrid Veninger
- With Feeling — Gillian McKercher
- The World to Come — Josh Fagen

==== Awards ====
- Best Feature - Sugar Daddy
- EDA Foundation Best Producer - Salar Pashtoonyar, Bad Omen
- Best Short - Jean-Sébastien Beaudoin-Gagnon, Acting Out
- DGC Ontario Best Director - Wendy Morgan, Sugar Daddy
- ReTAKE Furniture Rental Best Set Design - White Elephant
- William F. White Reel Canadian Indie - Events Transpiring Before, During, and After a High School Basketball Game
- Best Ensemble - White Elephant
- Best Music - Marie-Hélène L. Delorme, Sugar Daddy
- Best Performance - Kelly McCormack, Sugar Daddy
- Best Director (Short) - Katerine Martineau, Girls Shouldn't Walk Alone at Night
- Best Performance, Female (Short) - Joanie Martel, Moon (Lune)
- Best Performance, Male (Short) - Éric Bernier, Mister Cachemire (Monsieur Cachemire)
- Breakout Performance (Short) - Amaryllis Tremblay, Girls Shouldn't Walk Alone at Night
- Best Screenplay - Samuel Cartin, Mister Cachemire (Monsieur Cachemire)

=== 2022 ===
==== Features ====
- Ashgrove — Jeremy LaLonde
- Beneath the Surface (Le Lac des hommes) — Marie-Geneviève Chabot
- Carmen — Valerie Buhagiar
- The Last Mark — Reem Morsi
- The Long Rider — Sean Cisterna
- The Noise of Engines (Le Bruit des moteurs) — Philippe Grégoire
- A Small Fortune — Adam Perry
- Tehranto — Faran Moradi
- Tenzin — Michael LeBlanc, Josh Reichmann
- We're All in This Together — Katie Boland

==== Shorts ====
- Ahu's Journal — Weeda Azim
- Aska — Clara Milo
- Beast — Benjamin Nicolas
- Bleach — Mattias Graham
- Decomposing — Nessa Aref
- Defund — Khadijah Roberts-Abdullah, Araya Mengesha
- Feeling the Apocalypse — Chen Sing Yap
- fufu — Omolola Ajao
- god@mail.com — Roger Gariépy
- I Hate You — Taylor Olson, Koumbie
- In the Fray — Allyson Glenn
- In the Jam Jar — Colin Nixon
- Joutel — Alexa-Jeanne Dubé
- Mimine — Simon Laganière
- Not My Age — Kaitlyn Lee
- Nuisance Bear — Jack Weisman, Gabriela Osio Vanden
- On the Fence — Paula Ner Dormiendo
- Opération Carcajou — Nicolas Krief
- Proximity — Jamie Miller
- Rent Do — Gavin Michael Booth
- See You Garbage! (Au plaisir les ordures!) — Romain Dumont
- The Eternal Chaos of Allan Andre — Stephane Mukunzi
- The Future Innu (L'Innu du futur) — Stéphane Nepton
- Things We Feel But Do Not Say — Lauren Grant
- Trophy — Sandra Coppola
- We Don't Need Your Kind — Kennedy Kao
- White Rose — Marilou Caravecchia-Pelletier
- Woodpecker — Kevin T. Landry

==== Awards ====
- Best Feature - Carmen
- Best Short - See You, Garbage!
- DGC Ontario Best Director - Marie Geneviève Chabot, Beneath the Surface
- ReTAKE Furniture Rental Best Set Design - The Noise of Engines
- William F. White Reel Canadian Indie - Ashgrove
- Best Ensemble - Ashgrove
- Best Music - Tenzin
- Best Breakthrough Performance - Tenzin Kelsang, Tenzin
- Best Producer (Short) - Asad Chaudhry, On the Fence
- Best Acting Ensemble (Short) - I Hate You
- Best Cinematography (Short) - Sam Holling, Gabriela Osio Vanden and Jack Weisman, Nuisance Bear

=== 2023 ===
==== Features ====
- Babysitter — Monia Chokri
- Bloom (Jouvencelles) — Fanie Pelletier
- Bystanders — Koumbie
- Golden Delicious — Jason Karman
- How to Get Your Parents to Divorce (Pas d'chicane dans ma cabane!) — Sandrine Brodeur-Desrosiers
- Polarized — Shamim Sarif
- Retrograde — Adrian Murray
- Streams Flow from a River — Christopher Yip
- When Time Got Louder — Connie Cocchia
- Wintertide — John Barnard

==== Shorts ====
- Alex — Aisha Evelyna
- Amani — Alliah Fafin
- Bach Ma — Darlene Huynh
- Call Me Daddy — Amanda de Souza
- Corvine — Sean McCarron
- Desi Standard Time Travel — Kashif Pasta
- The English Teacher — Jeremy James Fokuoh
- Everything Will Be All Right — Farhad Pakdel
- Fursona — Alyssia Labbé-Hervieux
- Great Seeing You — Holly Pruner
- Junior's Giant — Paula Brancati
- Majboor-E-Mamool — Haaris Qadri
- Menace — Joy Webster
- Momma's Boy — Sonny Atkins
- No Bedroom — Ryan Leedu
- October 5th — Lily Labelle
- Quiet Minds Silent Streets — Karen Chapman
- Rachel and Raha — Nedda Sarshar
- Shallots and Garlic — Andrea Nirmala Widjajanto
- Sissy — Caleb Harwood, Simon Paluck
- Soap — Lulu Wei
- The Temple (Le Temple) — Alain Fournier
- There Are No Children Here — Shehrezade Mian
- There Was Nothing — Alexandre Lavigne
- The Untouchable — Avazeh Shahnavaz

==== Awards ====
- Best Feature - Babysitter
- Best Short - Menace
- DGC Ontario Best Director - Adrian Murray, Retrograde
- ReTAKE Furniture Rental Best Set Design - Babysitter
- William F. White Reel Canadian Indie - Bloom (Jouvencelles)
- Best Screenplay - How to Get Your Parents to Divorce (Pas d'chicane dans ma cabane!)
- Best Ensemble - How to Get Your Parents to Divorce (Pas d'chicane dans ma cabane!)
- People's Pick for Best Flick - Polarized
- Best Documentary Short - Quiet Minds Silent Streets
- Best Performance - Eric Peterson, Junior's Giant
- Best Breakthrough Performance - Cassandra Paige, No Bedroom
- Best Producer (Short) - Shyam Valera, Desi Standard Time Travel
- Best Acting Ensemble (Short) - The Untouchable
- Best Cinematography (Short) - There Was Nothing

=== 2024 ===
==== Features ====
- The Burning Season — Sean Garrity
- Daughter of the Sun — Ryan Ward
- Doubles — Ian Harnarine
- Hailey Rose — Sandi Somers
- Kite Zo A: Leave the Bones — Kaveh Nabatian
- Look at Me — Taylor Olson
- Place of Bones — Audrey Cummings
- Valley of Exile — Anna Fahr
- WaaPaKe — Jules Arita Koostachin
- With Love and a Major Organ — Kim Albright
- Wild Goat Surf — Caitlyn Sponheimer

==== Shorts ====
- Aftercare — Anubha Momin
- Ahu — Mahsa Razavi
- Bibi's Dog Is Dead — Shervin Kermani
- Bleak as the Setting Sun — Joanna Decc
- Boat People — Thao Lam, Kjell Boersma
- Breathe — Kimberly Miller-Pryce
- Capsule — Dani Kind
- Children of War — Salar Pashtoonyar
- Dead Cat — Annie-Claude Caron, Danick Audet
- Desync — Minerva Navasca
- Don't Forget Me — Alice Wang
- EITR — Fateema Al-Hamaydeh Miller
- Ephemera — Cici Clancy
- Erase & Rewind — Lauren Grant
- Fish Boy — Christopher Yip
- The Future Above Us — Vanessa Magic
- Grenfell Adrift on an Iceberg — John Hollands
- Hello Anson — Yvonne Sung
- Here and There (D'Ici, d'ailleurs) — Chadi Bennani
- Hot Local Singles Are in Your Area — Peter Sreckovic
- I Never Promised You a Jasmine Garden — Teyama Alkamli
- In the Heat — Samuel Chou
- In the Whiteness — Niya Ahmed Abdullahi
- Katshinau (Les Mains sales) — Julien G. Marcotte, Jani Bellefleur-Kaltush
- Khastegari — Camil Ghajary
- The Last Rhino (Le Dernier rhinocéros) — Guillaume Harvey
- Mum — Julia Patey
- Nosocomephilia — Michèle Kaye
- Return to Hairy Hill (Retour à Hairy Hill) — Daniel Gies
- Redlights — Eva Thomas
- Rock the Cradle — Asis Sethi
- Saint Bernard — Luke Sargent
- Seance for a Close Friend — Ammar Keshodia
- The Steak — Kiarash Dadgar
- Still Waters — Katia Café-Fébrissy
- Table for Three — Joseph Chung
- Three Trees — M.R. Horhager, Aaron Hong
- The Tweetations Revue — Fraser Collins
- Unibrow — Nedda Sarshar
- Until You Die (Jusqu’à ce que tu meures) — Florence Lafond
- Virga — Jean-François Leblanc
- What Good Canadians Do — Stephanie Joline
- When You Know You...Know? — Katie Uhlmann
- The Whipping Boy — Victor Oly
- Xie Xie, Ollie — James Michael Chiang

==== Awards ====
- Best Feature - With Love and a Major Organ
- Best Short - Redlights
- DGC Ontario Best Director - Anna Fahr, Valley of Exile
- William F. White Reel Canadian Indie - Doubles
- Best Screenplay - Jonas Chernick and Diana Frances, The Burning Season
- People's Pick for Best Flick - Doubles
- Best Leading Performance - Taylor Olson, Look At Me
- Best Supporting Performance - Errol Sitahal, Doubles
- Best Animated Short - Boat People
- Best Comedy Short - Dead Cat
- Best Documentary Short - Hello Anson
- Best Writing (Short) - Charles Dionne, Virga
- Best Producer (Short) - Kiarash Dadgar, The Steak
- Best Comedy Performance (Short) - EITR
- Best Dramatic Performance (Short) - Gauri Prasad, Rock the Cradle

=== 2025 ===
==== Features ====
- Conceiving Clara — Tarique Qayumi
- Crocodile Eyes — Ingrid Veninger
- Darkest Miriam — Naomi Jaye
- Gold Bars: Who the Fuck Is Uncle Ludwig? — Billie Mintz
- His Father's Son — Meelad Moaphi
- Home Free — Avi Federgreen
- The Killgrin — Joanna Tsanis
- Larry (They/Them) — Catherine Legault
- The Legacy of Cloudy Falls — Nick Butler
- Lunatic: The Luna Vachon Story — Kate Kroll
- The Players — Sarah Galea-Davis
- Please, After You — Rob Michaels
- Skeet — Nik Sexton
- To the Moon — Kevin Hartford
- Vampire Zombies... from Space! — Michael Stasko
- Waiting for the Storms (Le Temps) — François Delisle

==== Shorts ====
- Anyway, I Piss Sitting Down (Anyway, j'pisse assis) — Zak Slattery
- Beaupré the Giant (Géant Beaupré) — Alain Fournier
- Belonging — Benjamin Campbell
- Beyond the Gaze — Arianna Bardesono
- Black Empanadas — Sid Santiago Zanforlin
- Brave Rebel Army — Michelle D'Alessandro Hatt
- Days Before the Death of Nicky (Jours avant la mort de Nicky) — Denis Côté
- Capacity — Kristin Booth, Tim Ware
- Clementine — Beth Evans
- Chand — Arshad Mohamed
- Cranes Like White Giraffes — Josiah Dyck
- Do Us Part — William Phillips
- Easybake — Sasha Duncan
- Ezda — Halime Akturk
- Gatekeepers — Jason Speir, Ben Speir
- The Gift — Rebecca Applebaum
- A Good Day Will Come — Amir Zargara
- Greenhorn — Sabrina Way
- Hair! — Sara Jade Alfaro-Dehghani
- Hatch — Alireza Kazemipour, Panta Mosleh
- Herald — Sandro Pehar
- Kofi — Marianna Phung
- Lease Me Alone — Sandrine Brodeur-Desrosiers
- Lei 累 — Huiri Shi
- Raptured — Camille Trudel
- Michif Land-Based Knowledge — Robin Adams
- Mother's Tongue — Vanessa Millado
- My Son Went Quiet — Ian Bawa
- Nola — Aisha Evelyna, Natalie Novak Remplakowski
- Of May — Brit Kewin
- One Day — Yazmeen Kanji
- One Night on Opeongo — Sam Leslie
- The Other Stuff — Bernard Gray
- Paper Lanterns — Laura King
- Pasta Negra — Jorge Thielen Armand
- Saturday Class — Carri Chen
- The Sculptor — Joshua Banman
- The Show Will Begin Shortly — Liz Shmuilov
- Sleep Talking — Ethan Godel
- Spaceman — Dan Abramovici
- Spermatozoon — Beth Tang
- Summer Love — Virgile Ratelle
- Tailor Made — Quan Luong
- Thin Walls — Robert Armanyous
- Tina, When Will You Marry? — Celestina Aleobua
- Uasheskun — Normand Junior Thirnish-Pilot
- Uncomfy — Jessica Hinkson
- Wanda Justice Warrior — Josiane Blanc
- Waterman's Ballad — Jamie Knox
- Whispering in the Leaves — Luvleen Hunjan

==== Awards ====
- Best Feature - Darkest Miriam
- Best Documentary - Gold Bars: Who the Fuck Is Uncle Ludwig?
- Best Short - Sleep Talking
- DGC Ontario Best Director - Sarah Galea-Davis, The Players
- People's Pick for Best Flick - Skeet
- Special Mention for Originality - Waiting for the Storms
- Best Performance - Stefani Kimber, The Players
- Best Animated Short - Beaupré the Giant
- Best Comedy Short - Bail Bail
- Jury Honorable Mention - Sleep Talking
- Best Producer (Short) - Amir Zargara and Iman Tahsin, A Good Day Will Come
- Best Performance (Short) - Celia Green, Greenhorn

=== 2026 ===
==== Features ====
- Akashi — Mayumi Yoshida
- Ballistic — Chad Faust
- The Bearded Girl — Jody Wilson
- Best Boy — Jesse Noah Klein
- A Breed Apart — Adam Belanger, David Lafontaine
- A Farewell to Youth — Adam Jack
- Hangashore — Justin Oakey
- It Comes in Waves — Fitch Jean
- James — Max Train
- Los Rios — Ryan Fyfe-Brown, Dale Bailey
- Lucid — Deanna Milligan, Ramsey Fendall
- Mihnea — Mike Doaga
- Nesting (Peau à peau) — Chloé Cinq-Mars
- Plan C — Scott Cavalheiro
- #vanlife — Trevor Cameron
- What Comes Next — Alex Caulfield

==== Shorts ====
- Animals — Michael Makaroff
- As Long as We Are Immortal (Tant que nous sommes immortels) — Nora Burlet Dhainaut
- At the End — Isabelle Deluce, Lili Beaudoin
- Black Water (Lac en cœur) — Tim Bouvette
- Blood or Water — Kristina Mileska
- Conditions of Release — Mitchell Greenberg
- Eel — Wayne Burns
- En plein air — Morgana McKenzie
- Finding Shelter — Mehrtash Mohhit
- Flat — Suri Parmar
- For Dawn — Setareh Saleh
- Fractured Acts — Yeimi Daza
- Ghislaine's Place — Franie-Éléonore Bernier
- The Gnawer of Rocks (Mangittatuarjuk) — Louise Flaherty
- Halfway Haunted — Sam Rudykoff
- Halifax Pier — Matthew Daniel Herst
- I Am Pleased — Vanessa Magic
- Leili's Photo — Maral Mostafavi
- Leopard — Dan Abramovici
- The Line She Carries — Crystal Martin
- The Loon (Le Huard) — Paula Bourgie
- The Midnight Hour — Anita Yung
- My Grandmother's Tipi (Nuuhkuum Uumichiwaapim) — Lindsay Chewanish
- Niimi — Dana Solomon
- Pidikwe (Rumble) — Caroline Monnet
- Pink Elephant — Maria del Mar
- Portraits — Quan Luong
- Road 138 — Sarah Warren
- Rocco — Luke Gallagher
- S.A.D. — Vanessa Sandre
- Sea Star — Tyler Mckenzie Evans
- Sorry, It's a Girl — Jaskaran Gill
- Taco Boy — Lizzie Han
- A Tale of Ira Abbott — Sasha Zvereva
- V.I.N.C.E. (Voice Intelligent Narrative Creative Engine) — Adam Greydon Reid
- Vital — Amir Zargara
- Wayside — Roann Enriquez
- Winkie — Daniel Duranleau
- Winter After Winter — Brandon Kaufman
- Would You Love Me If I Were a Worm? — Aaron Alter

==== Awards ====
- Best Feature - Akashi
- Best Short - Sea Star
- DGC Ontario Best Director - Justin Oakey, Hangashore
- People's Pick for Best Flick - Akashi
- Special Jury Award for Cinematography - Hangashore
- Special Jury Award for Exceptional Vision - James
- Special Jury Award for Impact - Los Rios
- Best Performance (Short) - Artemis Aria, The Players
- Best Producer (Short) - Louise Flaherty, Leili's Photo
- Best Screenplay (Short) - Tim Bouvette, Jeanne Gourd and Camille L. Saint-Michelle, Black Water

== Gallery ==
Old logo before the name change
