= SKYGLOW =

Project exploring light pollution

SKYGLOW is an ongoing crowdfunded project exploring light pollution and its impact on cities, as well as North America's endangered dark-sky locations. It is produced by photographers/filmmakers Gavin Heffernan and Harun Mehmedinović, in association with the International Dark-Sky Association. It was funded by a Kickstarter fundraising campaign in 2015.

SKYGLOW was featured on Season 6 of the Discovery Science show Outrageous Acts of Science.

On December 5, 2015, Heffernan and Mehmedinović gave a talk about SKYGLOW at The Annenberg Space for Photography in Los Angeles, and previewed photos and video from their journeys.

SKYGLOW photography and videos has been featured in numerous media outlets and popular culture, including a performance of The Rolling Stones' song Moonlight Mile during their Zip Code Tour in 2015, Roger Waters at Desert Trip Indio, Cosmic Gate's music video for their single am2pm in 2016, BBC Earth, and the U.S. National Park Service as part of their official centennial celebration video.
