= Balls to the Wall (film) =

2011 American film directed by Penelope Spheeris

- Directed by: Penelope Spheeris
- Written by: Jason Nutt
- Starring: Joe Hursley; Jenna Dewan; Colleen Camp
- Music by: William Ross
- Release date: April 30, 2011 (Newport Beach)
- Running time: 97 minutes
- Country: United States
- Language: English

Balls to the Wall is a 2011 American comedy film written by Jason Nutt and directed by Penelope Spheeris. The film had its premiere at the Newport Beach Film Festival on April 30, 2011.

== Plot ==
An engaged guy is forced by his future father-in-law to take a side job moonlighting as an exotic dancer in order to pay for an extravagant wedding neither of them can afford.

== Cast ==
- Joe Hursley as Ben Camelino
- Jenna Dewan as Rachel Matthews
- Mimi Rogers as Mrs. Matthews
- Christopher McDonald as Mr. Matthews
- Colleen Camp as Maureen
- Antonio Sabato Jr. as Uncle Sven
- Nic Few as The Iceman
- Matthew Felker as Chad Goldstein
- Dustin Ybarra as Lewis Gardener
- Raymond O'Connor as Bernie Niles
- Freda Foh Shen as Miss Watson
