= Savannah Burton =

Actor

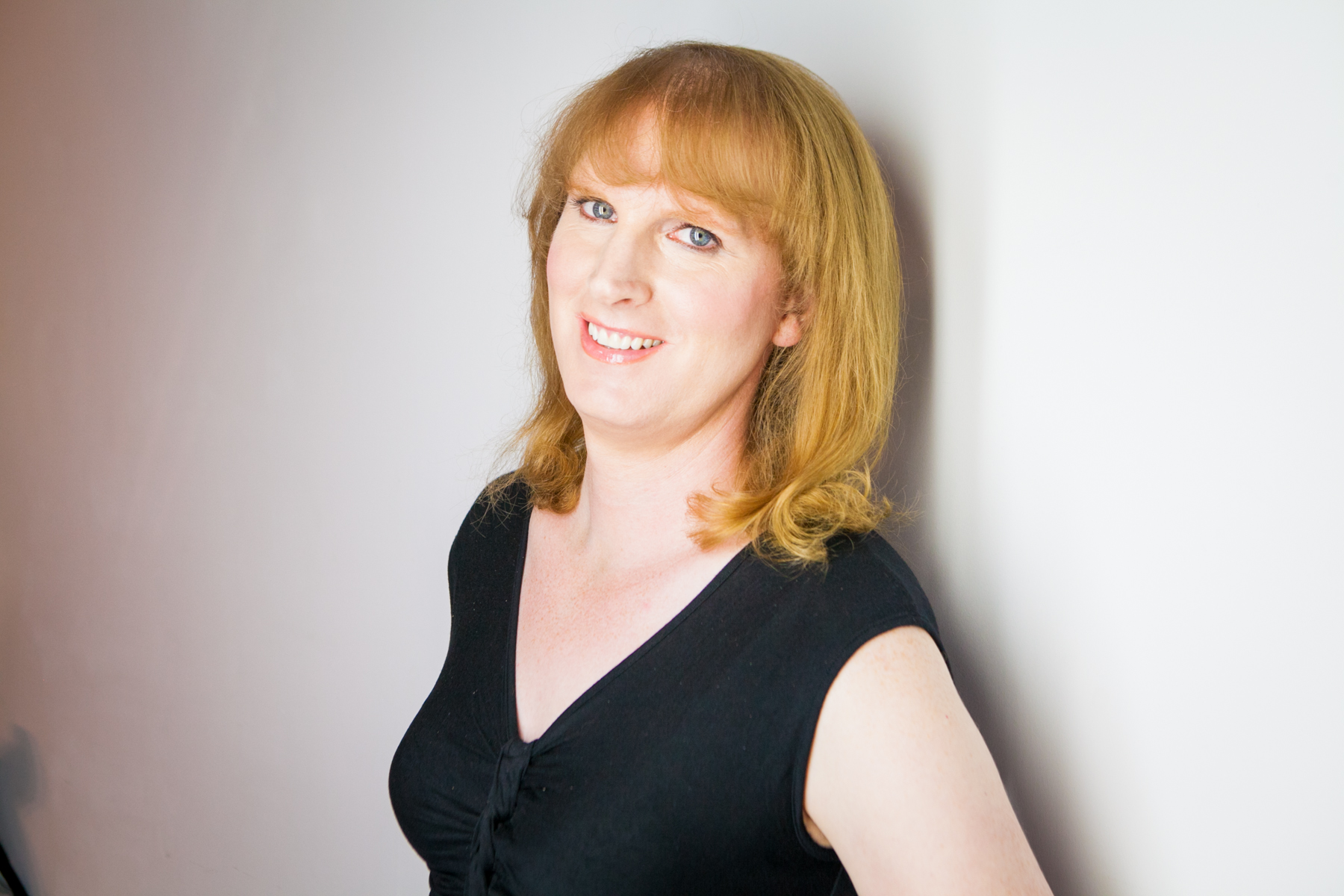
Burton in 2014

Savannah Burton (born c. 1977) is a Canadian actor and athlete originally from Corner Brook, Newfoundland. She was named to the Canadian national dodgeball team in March 2015, becoming the first out transgender athlete to compete for Canada internationally in team sports.

== Career ==
Burton became a member of the Canadian acting union ACTRA in 2006 and is best known for her roles on Beauty & the Beast on the CW Network and Killjoys on the Syfy network. In 2017, she was selected to be a member of Me to We Canada Future 50 series.

In 2017 she moved to Los Angeles to further her acting career.

In 2022 she appeared in the short film Junior's Giant.

== Athletics ==
In 2014 Burton competed in a rowing marathon in Ottawa. She and teammate Enza Anderson became the first openly trans rowers to compete in Canada.

She is the first out transgender athlete to compete for Canada internationally in team sports, having been selected for the Canadian national women's dodgeball team in March 2015. Her team finished fourth in the Dodgeball World Championship in Las Vegas that year. She competed again in 2017 as part of Team Maple Leaf when the championship was hosted at the Markham Pan Am Centre in Markham, Ontario. She had previously been a member of Canada's men's team at the inaugural 2012 world championship in Kuala Lumpur, before her transition.
