= Joe Hursley =

American actor

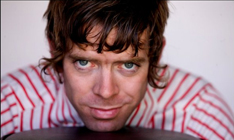
- Born: Joseph Gregory Hursley; March 19, 1979 (age 47); Austin, Texas
- Occupations: Actor, musician
- Website: http://joehursley.com/

Joseph Gregory "Joe" Hursley (born March 19, 1979) is an actor and musician living in Los Angeles, California.

== Early life ==
Hursley was born in Austin, Texas. His great-grandfather is Frank M. Hursley, co-creator of General Hospital, the longest running television soap opera. His father, Greg Hursley, is an architectural photographer and his mother Kelle is a nurse.

Hursley began his entertainment career after participating in the Schick "Groove n' Smooth" national talent search in 1999. He won the talent search, and started a karaoke company at age 19. He became well known in Austin nightlife scene as Karaoke Joe, going on to perform over five-hundred shows the next few years.

== Career ==
Hursley's first big break in the entertainment business was being tapped by Ashton Kutcher to star in the 2004 MTV reality comedy series You've Got a Friend. His task was to play an obnoxious 'friend' for 48 hours, while contestants had to prove their friendship in front of real friends and loved ones for a prize of $15,000. Hursley was increasingly sinister as the series progressed. After the show, Hursley joined Kutcher on Punk'd, where he pranked various celebrities.

He then appeared in major films including Accepted, Resident Evil: Extinction and Fast & Furious, which led him to his first starring feature role with cult director Penelope Spheeris in Balls to the Wall (2011). He also starred as the President of Nickelodeon Animation Studio in Nickelodeon's animated series, Fanboy & Chum Chum.

In 2009 Hursley starred in the rock opera Battle for Milkquarious, a promotional short film released by the California Milk Processor Board, creators of the "Got Milk?" campaign. Hursley played the film's protagonist, "Milktastic Rock Star" White Gold.

Hursley appeared in the 2013 action/fantasy/horror short "Sequence", which was internationally recognized at festivals worldwide, which included a nod for Best Actor (Short Shorts Film Festival Japan 2014), and winning overall Best Short at the LA Shorts Fest (2013).

In The Origins of Wit and Humor he played Les Candalero, a Woody Allen-esque outsider. In the upcoming indie feature "For All Eyes Always", he plays Thomas Devlin, a CIA operative starring in a government sanctioned reality TV show for the American public.

== Music ==
In late 2004, Hursley started the Los Angeles-based rock and roll band and Sunset Strip staples, The Ringers, with whom he released the albums Tokyo Massage III and Headlocks and Highkicks. They appeared in the Miami Ink episode "Ruthless and Toothless". The Ringers were featured in Spin in 2007. They also performed on stage in Accepted and were the only unsigned band to be featured on the movie soundtrack.

After the Ringers broke up in 2010, Joe and his cousin Patrick Hursley (the drummer of the Ringers) formed the indie rock band Indians. They released their self-titled debut in 2011. The first music video, "Sink Into You", was written and directed by Jordan Albertsen, and starred Joslyn Jensen and Taylor Handley.

Music by the Indians was featured in the 2012 film Rites of Passage, and the television shows Top Gear, and MTV's Catfish.

In 2013, Indians changed their name to We Were Indians, and released their debut album that same year.

== Filmography ==
Year	Title	Role	Notes
2004	You've Got a Friend	Frankie / Greg / Jack / ...	TV series Episodes: "Elie" "Erika" "Jayson" "Lindsey"
2004	No Pain, No Gain	Zigbar Miekbach	Feature
2004	10-8: Officers on Duty	Shooter	TV series Episodes: "Gypsy Road"
2005	Keeping Up with the Jonesers	Jonesers Nate	Short
2005	Horror High	Wild Willie Wilson	Video
2006	Punk'd	Field Agent / Himself	TV series Episodes: "Episode #7.8" "Episode #7.6" "Episode #7.2" "Episode #7.4" "Episode #7.3" "Episode #7.1"
2006	Accepted	Maurice	Feature
2006	Accepted	The Ringers	Singer/Songwriter: "Spotlite", "Keepin' Your Head Up"
2006	Broken	Rob	Feature
2007	Campus Ladies	Tambo	TV series Episode: "Safety First"
2007	Resident Evil: Extinction	Otto	Feature
2007	Weekend Junkies	Dirty Steve	
2008	Terminator: The Sarah Connor Chronicles	Tristan Dewitt	TV series Episode: "Brothers of Nablus"
2009	Monk	Winston Kasinsky	TV series Episode: "Mr. Monk and the Lady Next Door"
2009	Fast & Furious	Virgil	Feature
2009	Battle for Milkquarious	White Gold	Short
2009	Glee	Joe	TV series Episode: "Vitamin D"
2010	The Clinic	Marty Forrest	TV series Episodes: "Trouble Brewing" "Marijuana Meatloaf" "Raiders of the Lost Pot" "The Client Room" "Jab's in Love" "Marty's Home Away from Home"
2010	Burn Notice	Justin Walsh	TV series Episode: "Brotherly Love"
2010	CSI: Crime Scene Investigation	Junkie	TV series Episode: "Turn On, Tune In, Drop Dead"
2011	Balls to the Wall	Ben Camelino	Feature
2011	Here's to Big Bear		Short
2012	Awake	Francis	TV series Episode: "Two Birds"
2012	Golden Winter	Frankie	Feature
2012	Jack's Not Sick Anymore	Kip	Short
2012	Fanboy & Chum Chum	Nickelodeon President	TV series Episode: "Slime Day"
2012	From The Head	John	Feature
2013	RockBarnes: The Emperor in You	One Armed Man	Feature
2013	Sequence	Billy	Short
2013	Youth Large	Cheffid Rigsby	TV Pilot
2014	The Savages	Dad	Pilot
2014	L.A. Rangers	Hiker / Cowboy	TV series Episode: "Once Upon a Time in the Park"
2014	The Origins of Wit and Humor	Les Candalero	Feature
2015	For All Eyes Always	Thomas Devlin	Feature; Post Production
2015-16	Gamer's Guide to Pretty Much Everything	Mr. Spanks	Recurring Role (season 1)
2019-20	Dad	Neighbor / Malvin Bim	Web series Recurring Role (seasons 1–3)
2023	Rumble Through the Dark	Skelly	Feature
2024	Drugstore June	Lucas	Feature
2025	The Long Shot	Sir James	Feature
