= In the Name of the Son (2007 film) =

- Directed by: Harun Mehmedinović
- Written by: Harun Mehmedinović
- Produced by: Vikramadithya Singh
- Starring: Sergej Trifunović, Jack Dimich, Elvedin Slipac, Ingrid Walters, Nino Cirabisi
- Cinematography: Jason Raswant
- Edited by: Tyler Earring
- Music by: Pinar Toprak
- Release date: 2007
- Running time: 26 minutes
- Countries: United States; Bosnia and Herzegovina; India
- Languages: English, Bosnian

In the Name of the Son is a 2007 drama/thriller short film, set during and after the Bosnian War in present-day Los Angeles, written and directed by Harun Mehmedinović and produced by Vikramadithya Singh.

== History ==
The 25-minute film took a year and a half to complete and premiered at Telluride Film Festival in September, 2007. The film is not autobiographical, but it addresses the breakdown of normal societal ties that people in Bosnia witnessed and that Mehmedinović said he could not have written about without experiencing.

== Plot ==
The Name of the Son is a film that looks at human conflicts in the present, brought about during personal clashes in the Bosnian War in 1994.

After escaping execution, Tarik, a Bosnian prisoner of war, immigrates to the United States looking to leave his past behind. The psychosis of the conflicts that war brought to him when coping with these in civilian life are very hard for him. Years later, the man who spared his life shows up on Tarik's doorstep asking for a favor. However, the two main protagonists' feelings of guilt and torment are brought to bear with near devastating consequences.

== Cast ==
- Sergej Trifunović as Tarik
- Jack Dimich as Pavle
- Elvedin Slipac as Milan
- Ingrid Walters as Ayanna
- Nino Cirabisi as Passenger
- Zoran Radanovich as Serb Officer #1
- Zoran Danilović as Serb Officer #2
- Val Marijan as Serb Officer #3
- Mark Simich as Serb Officer #4
- Edin Gali as Bosnian POW #1
- William Love as Bosnian POW #2
- Eric Reinholt as Bosnian POW #3
- Jessica Moreno as Passenger
- Ryan O'Quinn as World Cup Announcer #1
- Chip Mullaney as World Cup Announcer #2

== Awards ==
Winner of 30 International Awards including:

- Best Director
  - Franklin J. Schaffner Award, American Film Institute
  - Richard P. Rogers Award, American Film Institute
  - Special Jury Award, WorldFest-Houston International Film Festival
- Best Short
  - San Diego Film Festival
  - Stony Brook Film Festival
  - BendFilm Festival
  - Cleveland International Film Festival
  - USA Film Festival
  - Tallahassee Film Festival
  - Savannah Film Festival
- Other awards
  - Angelus Award for "Audience Impact"
  - Bridges/Larson Foundation Award for Screenwriting
