= Mars Horodyski =

Mars Horodyski is a Canadian film and television director and screenwriter based in Toronto, Ontario. She is most noted as director and co-writer of the 2014 film Ben's at Home, for which she won the Canadian Comedy Award for Best Direction in a Film at the 16th Canadian Comedy Awards.

She has also received two Canadian Screen Award nominations, with nods for Best Direction, Variety or Sketch Comedy for This Hour Has 22 Minutes and Best Web Program Or Series, Fiction for Terrific Women at the 6th Canadian Screen Awards in 2018, and a Directors Guild of Canada nomination for Best Direction in a Comedy Series in 2019 for Mr. D.

Her other credits have included episodes of the web series Carmilla and the television series The Next Step, Zerby Derby, Odd Squad, Dino Dana, Star Falls, Holly Hobbie, Cavendish, Carter, Murdoch Mysteries, Ghostwriter, Endlings, Hudson & Rex, Pretty Hard Cases, Workin' Moms, Fakes and Beyond Black Beauty.
