= Ice on Fire (2019 film) =

2019 documentary on potential extinction event

- Directed by: Leila Conners
- Produced by: Leonardo DiCaprio; Leila Conners; Mathew Schmid; Nancy Abraham; George DiCaprio
- Narrated by: Leonardo DiCaprio
- Cinematography: Harun Mehmedinović
- Edited by: Leila Conners
- Music by: Jeremy Soule
- Production companies: HBO Documentary Films; Tree Media; Appian Way Productions
- Distributed by: HBO
- Release dates: May 22, 2019 (Cannes Film Festival); June 11, 2019 (United States)
- Running time: 98 minutes
- Country: United States
- Language: English

Ice on Fire is a 2019 documentary which explores the potential extinction level event caused by arctic methane release, and the newly developed technologies that could reverse global warming by sequestering carbon out of the atmosphere. The film premiered to a standing ovation at Cannes Film Festival on May 22, 2019. and HBO on June 11, 2019.

== Reception ==
Ice on Fire premiered at Cannes Film Festival to rave reviews. Screen Daily praised the film, stating: "Given humanity’s alarming capacity for tuning out the stuff with which it doesn’t want to engage, this slick documentary, which coats its doomsday scenario pill with a sugaring of science as saviour, might be the best chance yet to bring the message to the broader population. The film, which debuts on HBO on June 11, should be essential viewing for anyone who plans to carry on living on the planet; its approach, while never patronising or simplistic, manages to convey the scientific basics in a way which should not be entirely alienating to a lay audience." The Hollywood Reporter Cannes review praised the film, stating: "...as a beginners' guide to Arctic thaw and its consequences, this is pretty exemplary stuff. Instead of anchoring the explanation around a dominant, often onscreen TED-talk-cum-storyteller like campaigner Al Gore or naturalist David Attenborough, Ice on Fire keeps the narration (only heard) from DiCaprio to a judicious medium, bedding it over high-definition footage, often shot with drones or using time-lapse techniques, under the direction of cinematographer Harun Mehmedinovic." Variety also praised the documentary deeming it a better follow-up to The 11th Hour, and said that it 'continues to spread the alarm about climate change but this time offers concrete solutions."

As of October 2021, 91% of the ten review compiled on Rotten Tomatoes are positive, with an average rating of 7.1/10.
