= Expiration (film) =

- Expiration Poster
- Directed by: Gavin Heffernan
- Written by: Gavin Heffernan
- Produced by: Ben Dally; Sebastian Grobys; Samantha Gutterman
- Starring: Janet Lane; Gavin Heffernan; Erin Simkin; Yetide Badaki
- Cinematography: Ben Dally; Sebastian Grobys
- Edited by: Gavin Heffernan
- Music by: Jon Day
- Release date: September 25, 2003
- Running time: 102 minutes
- Country: Canada
- Language: English

Expiration is an independent feature film, directed by Gavin Heffernan and released in 2003. The film stars Heffernan as Sam, a man who unwittingly walks in on a convenience store robbery in Montreal and must team up with drug dealer Rachel (Janet Lane) in an attempt to recover their stolen goods.

It was the winner of the Grand Jury Prize and Best Feature Film at the 2004 Canadian Filmmakers' Festival.
