= Desert Trip =

2016 music festival in Indio, California

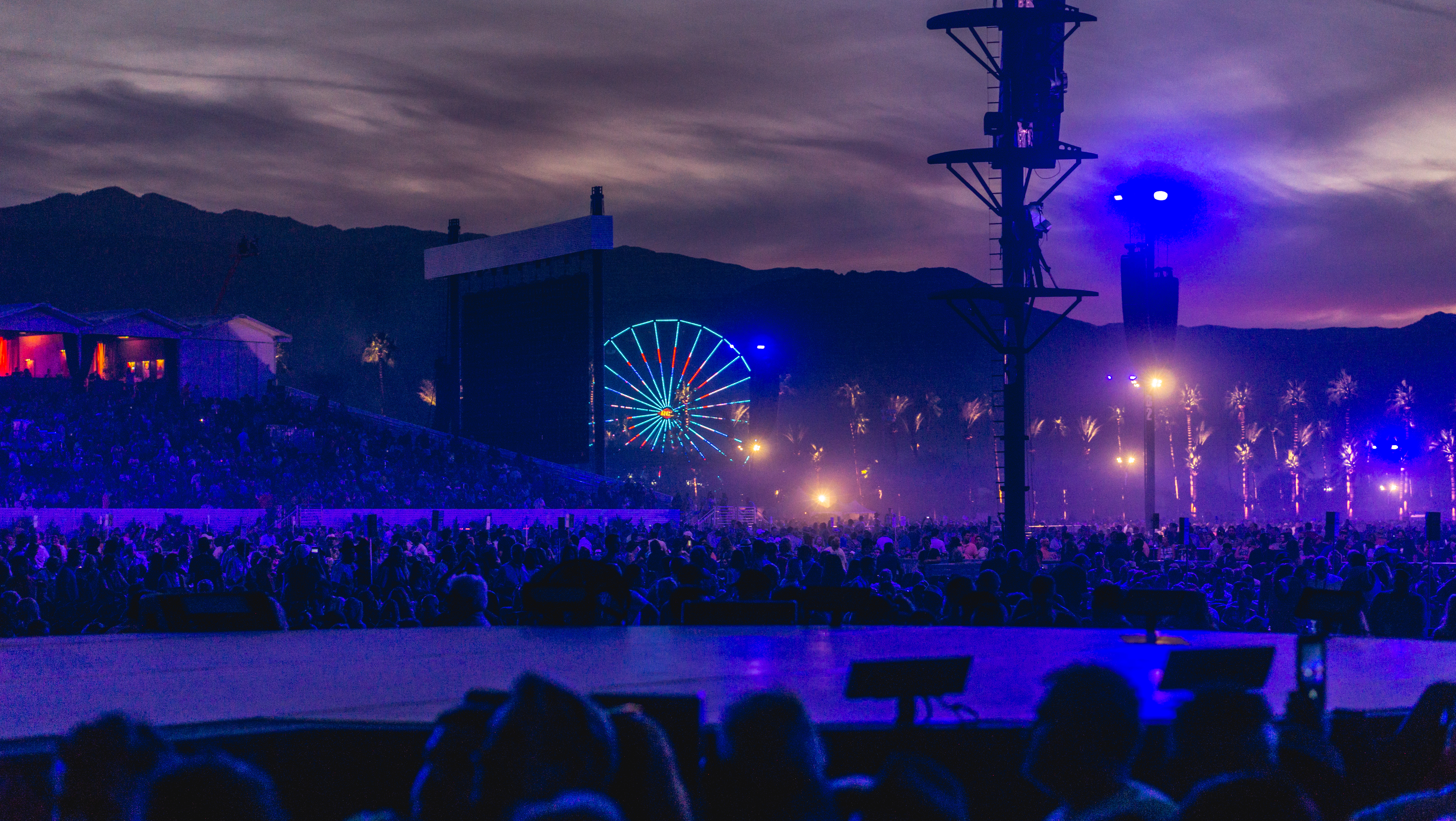
- Genre: Rock
- Dates: October 7–9 and 14–16, 2016
- Locations: Empire Polo Club; 81–800 Avenue 51; Indio, California 92201
- Founders: Paul Tollett
- Organizer: Goldenvoice
- Website: deserttrip.com

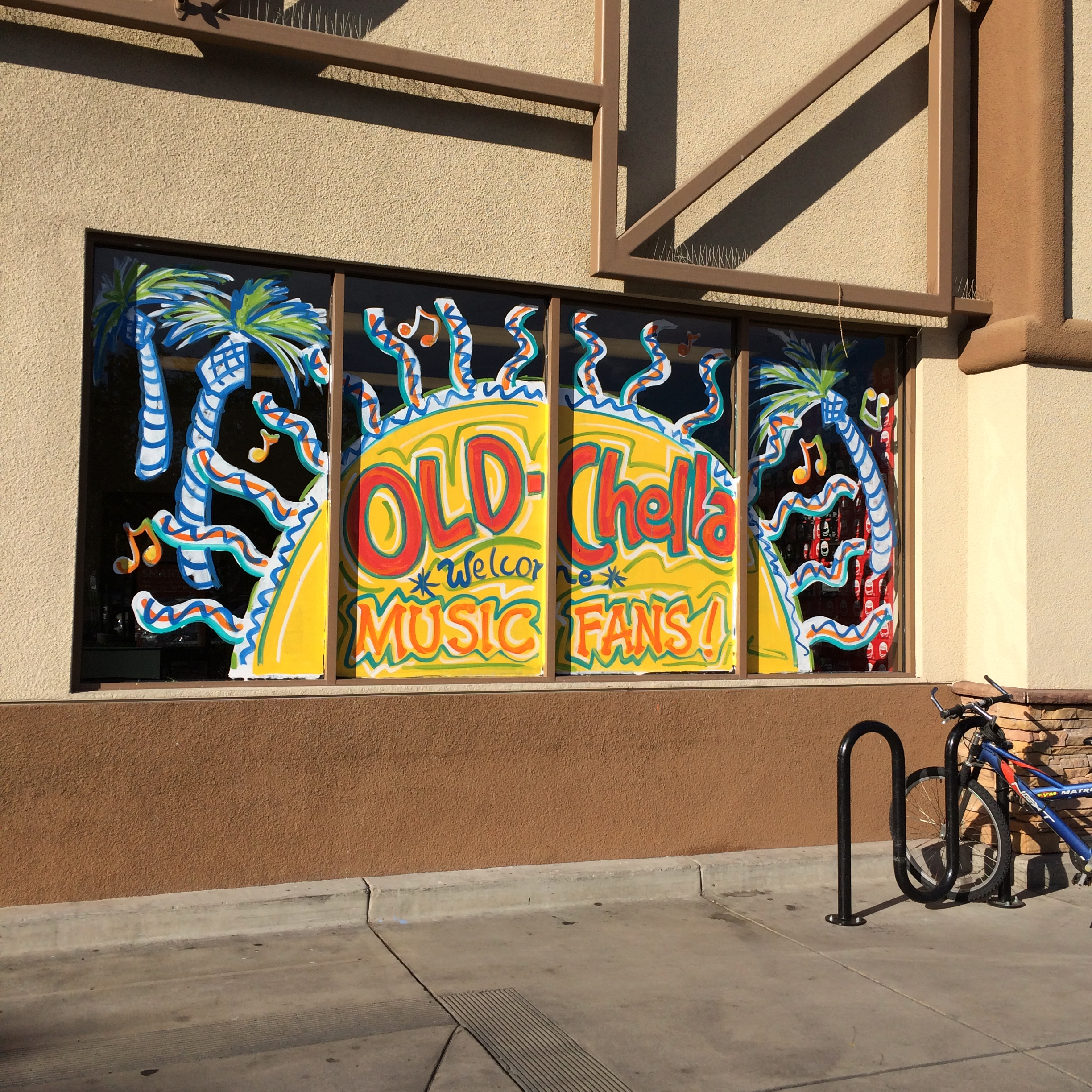
"Old-chella" window display in a Palm Desert storefront during the festival

Desert Trip was a six-day music festival that took place on October 7–9 and 14–16, 2016, at the Empire Polo Club in Indio, California, United States. The performers were The Rolling Stones, Bob Dylan, Paul McCartney, Neil Young, Roger Waters, and The Who. The festival was dubbed "Oldchella" by Stereogum a few weeks before it was officially announced, referencing both the age of the performers and the fact that the concert was arranged by Goldenvoice, the company that also promotes the Coachella Valley Music and Arts Festival at the same venue.

== History ==
Desert Trip was founded by Coachella co-founder, producer, and Goldenvoice chief, Paul Tollett.

It was produced by Goldenvoice, the company that runs Coachella and is owned by AEG. According to The New York Times the average attendee spent $1,000 on the weekend event.

== Notable performances ==
Bob Dylan opened the weekend with his song "Rainy Day Women #12 & 35".

The Rolling Stones covered The Beatles' "Come Together".

Paul McCartney opened his October 15 set with "A Hard Day's Night". In the same show, he surprised his audience with a performance of his song "FourFiveSeconds" with special guest Rihanna. He also invited Neil Young on the stage to perform "Why Don't We Do It In The Road?" for the first time ever and "A Day In The Life" with him. They then continued on to perform a cover of John Lennon's "Give Peace A Chance".

Neil Young delivered his iconic song "Harvest Moon" to a large hunter's moon during weekend 2. The crowd cheered as the lyrics "there's a full moon rising" came up.

Bob Dylan's October 14 performance came the day after he was announced as the 2016 Nobel Prize in Literature winner.

Roger Waters notably used his performance to make negative comments about 2016 Republican Presidential nominee Donald Trump and cite his support of Palestine in its conflict with Israel.

== Lineup ==
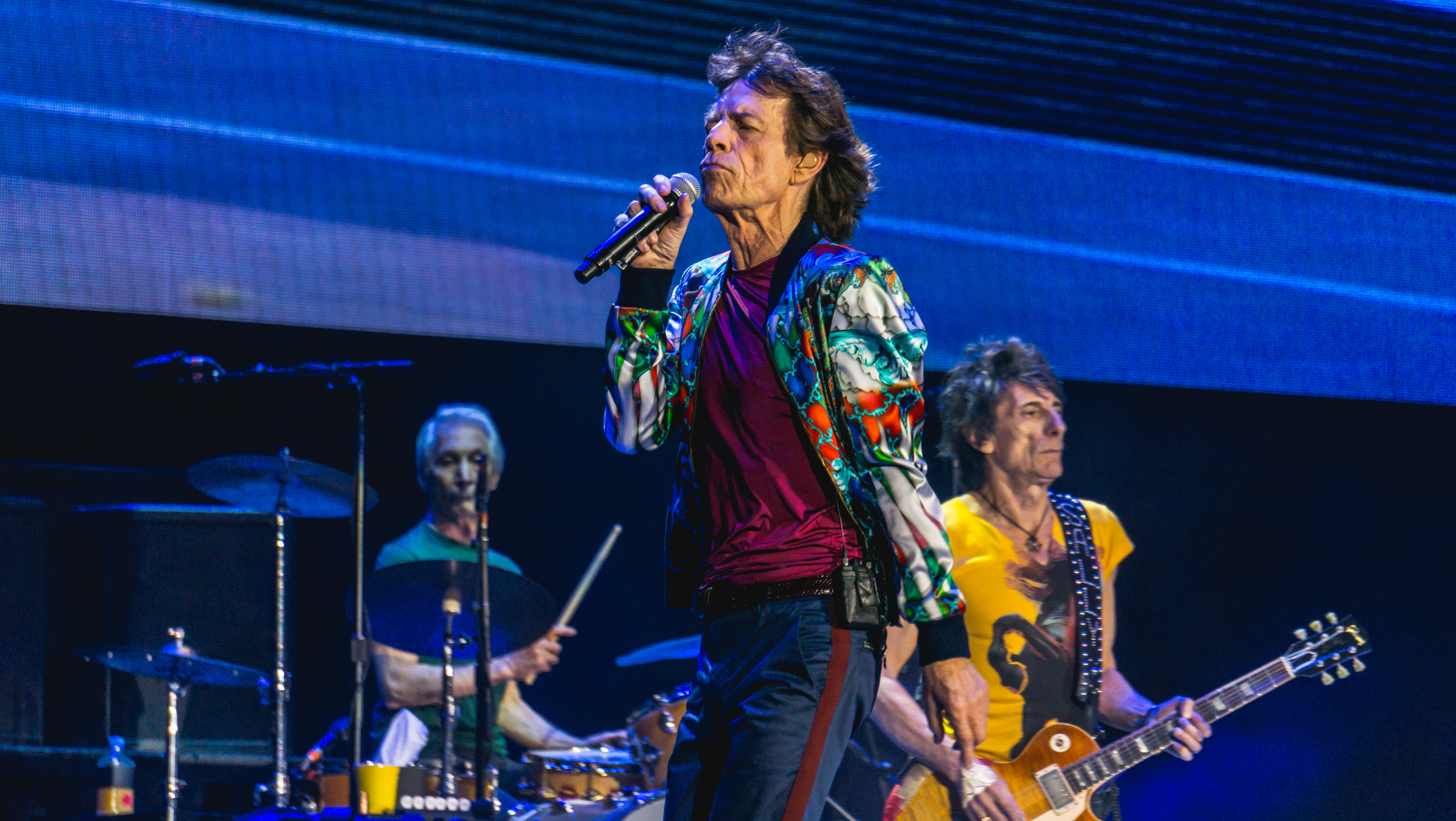
The Rolling Stones during their performance on the festival's opening day

Friday, October 7, 14

- Bob Dylan, The Rolling Stones

Saturday, October 8, 15

- Neil Young, Paul McCartney

Sunday, October 9, 16

- The Who, Roger Waters
