= David Bezmozgis =

Latvian Canadian writer and filmmaker

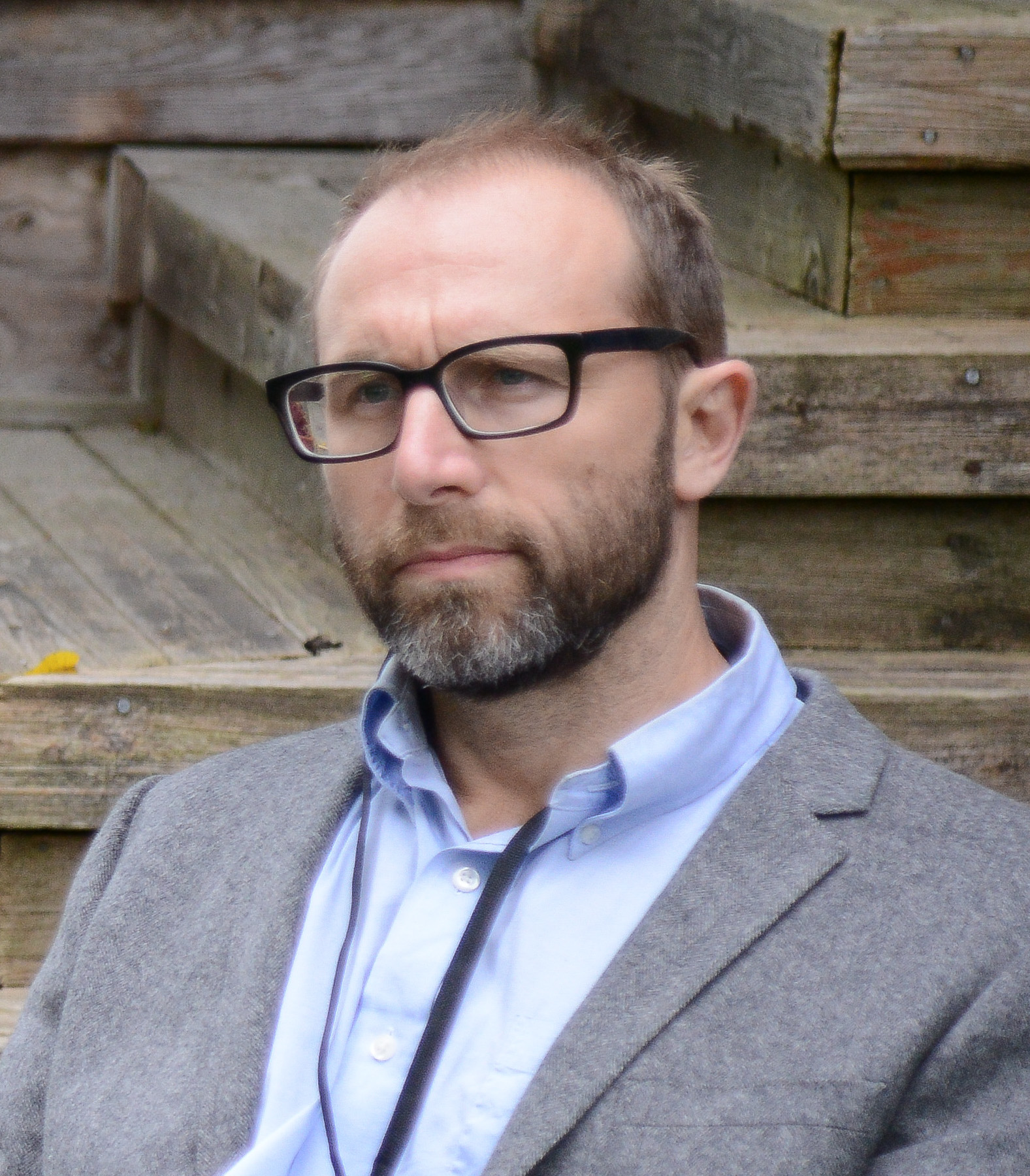
- Bezmozgis at the Eden Mills Writers' Festival in 2014
- Born: June 2, 1973 (age 53); Riga, Latvia

David Bezmozgis (Latvian: Dāvids Bezmozgis; born 1973) is a Latvian-born Canadian writer and filmmaker, currently the head of Humber College's School for Writers.

== Life and career ==
=== Educational background ===
Born in Riga, Latvia, he came to Canada with his family when he was six. He graduated with a B.A. in English literature from McGill University. Bezmozgis received an M.F.A. from the University of Southern California's School of Cinema-Television.

=== Short stories ===
His short story "Natasha", which originally appeared in Harper's, was included in the Best American Short Stories 2005 collection. His short story "The Train of Their Departure", which The New Yorker featured in its August 2010 issue, is actually an excerpt from his first novel The Free World, released on April 4, 2011, to wide acclaim. His short stories "Tapka", "The Russian Riviera" and "From, To" were also published in The New Yorker. His short stories "The Second Strongest Man" and "A New Gravestone for an Old Grave" have been published in Zoetrope All-Story. "A New Gravestone for an Old Grave" was also included in the Best American Short Stories 2006 collection.

His short story "Minyan" was published in the Winter 2002 issue of Prairie Fire and won the Silver Medal in the 2003 National Magazine Award for Fiction. His short story "An Animal to the Memory" was also published in Vol. 5, No. 2 (2002) of paperplates. His short story "Rome, 1978" was published in the April 2011 issue of The Walrus.

His short story collection, Immigrant City, was published in 2019.

=== Books ===
His first published book is Natasha and Other Stories (2004). Stories from that collection first appeared in The New Yorker, Harper's and Zoetrope All-Story. Natasha and Other Stories was chosen for inclusion in Canada Reads 2007, where it was championed by Steven Page.

Bezmozgis' first novel The Free World (2011) was published in 2011. Set in Italy in 1978, Bezmozgis' novel chronicles the experience of Jewish refugees from the USSR. Critics in North America and in Europe have suggested that in this novel Berzmozgis presented through a fictional lens what another Jewish-Soviet immigrant Maxim D. Shrayer had described in his book "Waiting for America" (2007). It was subsequently nominated and shortlisted for the Giller Prize, the Governor General's Literary Award for English-language fiction, the Amazon.ca First Novel Award, and for the Governor General's Awards.

Bezmozgis' second novel, The Betrayers (2014) is about a famous Russian Jewish dissident who, after the fall of the Soviet Union, meets the man who denounced him. He also worked on the novel during a New York Public Library Cullman Center fellowship that he received. The novel was published in 2014 by Little, Brown and Company.

=== Films ===
==== Short films and documentaries ====
In 1999, while still a film student at the USC School of Cinematic Arts, Bezmozgis directed and wrote his first film, a short 25-minute documentary called L.A. Mohel, which won a major award for student filmmakers. In 2001, Bezmozgis wrote and directed a narrative short film entitled The Diamond Nose (2001), which starred Paul Lieber. In 2003, Bezmozgis directed a documentary entitled Genuine Article: The First Trial (2003), about the recruitment system for hiring law student interns used by Canadian law firms.

==== Feature films ====
In 2008 he completed his first narrative feature film, Victoria Day (2009), which he wrote and directed. The film stars Mark Rendall as a high-school hockey star dealing with emerging adulthood pressures and the expectations of his Russian-speaking parents. The film also had its world premiere at the 2009 Sundance Film Festival, where it was nominated for the Grand Jury Prize in the "World Cinema - Dramatic" category. It was also nominated for a Best Screenplay award at the 2010 Genie Awards. The film has also screened at the Shanghai International Film Festival, the Moscow International Film Festival, the Hamptons International Film Festival, the Athens International Film Festival, the Seoul International Youth Film Festival, the San Francisco Jewish Film Festival, and the Toronto Jewish Film Festival.

In 2015, Bezmozgis wrote and directed his second narrative feature film, Natasha (2015), based on his award-winning short story of the same name. The film stars Alex Ozerov and Sasha K. Gordon. Natasha was released theatrically in Canada by Mongrel Films in 2016. In 2017 the film received Canadian Screen Award nominations for Best Actress (Gordon) and Best Adapted Screenplay at the 5th Canadian Screen Awards.

Bezmozgis and Erik Rutherford cowrote the screenplay for the 2021 film Charlotte, for which they received a Canadian Screen Award nomination for Best Adapted Screenplay at the 10th Canadian Screen Awards in 2022, and a Writers Guild of Canada nomination for Best Feature at the 26th WGC Screenwriting Awards.

In 2025, Bezmozgis entered production on The Betrayers, a film adaptation of his own 2014 novel. It is scheduled to premiere in the Centrepiece program at the 2026 Toronto International Film Festival.

==== Television ====
Bezmozgis was a writer-producer on the fifth and final season of Orphan Black, writing an episode in 2017 titled, Manacled Slim Wrists.

== Personal life ==
As of 2014, Bezmozgis is married with three children.

== Awards ==
- New York Public Library Cullman Center Fellowship in 2010
- Named as One of the "Top 20 Fiction Writers Under the Age of 40" by The New Yorker in 2010
- Silver Medal in the 2003 National Magazine Awards for Fiction, "Minyan" in Prairie Fire (Winter 2002 - Vol. 23, No. 4)
- Helen and Stan Vine Canadian Jewish Book Award for Fiction, Koffler Centre of the Arts (2005)
- The Reform Judaism Prize for Jewish Fiction (2004)
- Commonwealth First Book Prize for Caribbean/Canada (2004)
- Danuta Gleed Literary Award for best first collection of short fiction in the English language (2005)
- Guggenheim Fellowship (2005)
- City of Toronto Book Award (2005)
- JQ Wingate Prize 2005 Fiction, Natasha and Other Stories
- National Jewish Book Award for The Betrayers (2015)
- Edward Lewis Wallant Award for The Betrayers (2014)
- National Jewish Book Award for The Betrayers (2014)

=== Finalist ===
- Guardian First Book Award (UK) (2004)
- Governor General's Awards for Literature (2004)
- Borders Original Voices Award (2004)
- Los Angeles Times Art Seidenbaum Award for First Fiction (2004)
- National Magazine Awards for fiction (2005)
- Scotiabank Giller Prize for The Free World (2011)
- Scotiabank Giller Prize for The Betrayers (2014)
- Giller Prize Immigrant City (2019)

== Work (short stories) available online ==
- An Animal to The Memory in paperplates (2002 - Vol. 5 No. 2)
- Tapka from The New Yorker (May 19, 2003)
- The Second Strongest Man from Zoetrope All-Story (Summer 2003 - Vol. 7 No. 2)
- Natasha in Harper's Magazine (May 2004)
- The Russian Riviera from The New Yorker (May 30, 2005)
- A New Gravestone for an Old Grave from Zoetrope All-Story (Summer 2005 - Vol. 7 No. 2)
- The Train of Their Departure from The New Yorker (August 9, 2010)
- Rome, 1978 from The Walrus (April 2011)

== Bibliography ==
=== Novels ===
- The Free World (2011) (Viking Press)
- The Betrayers (2014) (Little, Brown and Company)

=== Short story collections ===
- Natasha: And Other Stories (2004) (Farrar, Straus and Giroux)
- Immigrant City (2019)

=== Selected short stories ===
- Minyan in Prairie Fire (Winter 2002 – Vol. 23, No. 4) (silver-medal winner, National Magazine Awards)
- An Animal to The Memory in paperplates (2002 - Vol. 5 No. 2)
- Tapka from The New Yorker (May 19, 2003)
- The Second Strongest Man from Zoetrope All-Story (Summer 2003 - Vol. 7 No. 2)
- Natasha in Harper's Magazine (May 2004)
- The Russian Riviera from The New Yorker (May 30, 2005)
- A New Gravestone for an Old Grave from Zoetrope All-Story (Summer 2005 - Vol. 7 No. 2)
- The Train of Their Departure from The New Yorker (August 9, 2010)
- Rome, 1978 from The Walrus (April 2011)

== Filmography ==
=== As writer and/or director ===
Year	Film	Role	Other notes
1999	L.A. Mohel	writer, director	short documentary
2001	The Diamond Nose	writer, director	short film
2003	Genuine Article: The First Trial	director	television documentary
2008	Victoria Day	writer, director	feature film
2016	Natasha	writer, director	feature film
2021	Charlotte	cowriter with Erik Rutherford	animated feature film
2026	The Betrayers	writer, director	feature film
