= Alessandra Piccione =

Italian Canadian screenwriter

- Education: University of Toronto (BA); University of Victoria (MA)
- Occupations: Screenwriter, producer
- Website: https://snapfilmsinc.com/

Alessandra Piccione is a Canadian screenwriter and producer, known for her work on the films Looking for Angelina, The Colossal Failure of the Modern Relationship, and The Cuban. She completed her Bachelor of Arts at the University of Toronto, and her Master of Arts in literature at the University of Victoria, with high distinction.

She began her writing career in the world of theatre, where she received acclaim for her play, Naked, an adaptation of Nobel Prize-winning author Luigi Pirandello’s Vestire Gli Ignudi for the Pirandello Theatre Society. Since then, Piccione has written short films, television series, a documentary, and three feature films under her production banner S.N.A.P. Films Inc, with a particular interest in telling female stories.

== Career ==
=== Early work and Looking for Angelina ===
Piccione produced the short film Over a Small Cup of Coffee, which premiered in Los Angeles in April 2001 at LAIFA, winning the special recognition award, and at the Toronto Italian Film Festival in June 2001. She wrote and produced the documentary Going to the Movies, as well as the short Commedia for Bravo! (now CTV Drama Channel) and the film Il Bagno (The Bath). Both films premiered at the Toronto Italian Film Festival.

Piccione became interested in the history of Angelina Napolitano after meeting New York playwright Frank Canino. Together, Piccione and Canino wrote the screenplay for Looking for Angelina as a poignant re-telling of a little-known part of Canadian history. The film tells the story of Italian immigrant Napolitano, who killed her abusive husband with an axe on Easter Sunday in Sault Ste. Marie, Ontario in 1911. Looking for Angelina was a featured film at the 2005 Montreal World Festival, 2005 International Film Festival of India, 2005 Shadows of the Mind Film Festival, 2005 Cimameriche Film Festival in Genova, Italy, and 2014 Bay Street Film Festival (now the Vox Popular Media Arts Festival) Retrospective, among others.

It won the Best Feature Drama and Award of Distinction at the Quintus Film Festival in Montreal and the Audience Award at the Bay Street Film Festival, among other accolades. The film was theatrically released in 2006, and was in the top five at the Canadian box office, according to Playback.

=== The Colossal Failure of the Modern Relationship, shorts, and S.N.A.P. Films Inc. ===
In 2011, Piccione wrote and produced the short film Serena DeBergerac. In 2012, she wrote and produced The Fortune Cookie, which won an Award of Merit at the Best Shorts Competition and in 2014, she produced En Plein Air, which was showcased at Nuit Blanche in Sault Ste. Marie, Ontario.

She reunited with Frank Canino to co-write The Reunion, which won the Feature Screenplay award at the WILDSound International Screenplay Festival in Toronto, Canada. She also wrote feature scripts for AMBI Pictures, and Ken Corday and NBC Studios.

In 2015, Piccione wrote the screenplay for The Colossal Failure of the Modern Relationship, a comedy-drama shot entirely in Niagara's wine country. Released theatrically in 2017, the film stars Enrico Colantoni, Krista Bridges, and David Cubitt. The film had its world premiere at the Niagara Integrated Film Festival, its western Canada premiere at the Whistler Film Festival, and its U.S. premiere at the Sonoma International Film Festival in 2016. The film won the Castlepoint Numa Award at the Italian Contemporary Film Festival in Toronto.

Piccione co-founded production company and creative hub S.N.A.P. Films Inc. with director Sergio Navarretta.

=== The Cuban, Margaret Herrick Library, and upcoming projects ===
Inspired by her own personal experience and many conversations about the subject matter, Piccione wrote the screenplay for The Cuban.

Shot in Canada and Havana, Cuba, the film stars Academy Award winner Louis Gossett Jr., Academy Award nominee Shohreh Aghdashloo, Ana Golja, Lauren Holly, and Giacomo Gianniotti and centres on the unexpected friendship between Luis Garcia, an elderly Cuban musician with dementia, and Mina, his care worker, who brings Luis out of his shell through a shared love of music.

The Cuban premiered in Canada on 7 December 2019 at the Whistler Film Festival, where it won the Borsos Competition award and was a runner-up for the Audience Award for the festival's Canadian films. It had its U.S. premiere in February 2020 at the Los Angeles Pan African Film Festival where it won the Audience Award for Narrative Feature and the Special Programmer's Award.

Following sold-out screenings in Los Angeles and being featured in the Canadian Film Festival’s selection of films that aired on Super Channel, The Cuban successfully opened the ICFF Lavazza Drive-In Film Festival in 2020. It was released theatrically across North America in July 2020.

In 2020, Piccione's screenplay for The Cuban was selected to be featured in the permanent Core Collection in the Academy of Motion Picture Arts and Science’s Margaret Herrick Library. Additionally, the film was in the nomination race for the 93rd Academy Awards, and was nominated for three awards at the 2021 Canadian Screen Awards.

In 2024 April 29, Piccione was nominated for the 32nd Annual RBC Canadian Women Entrepreneur Awards. Piccione wrote the screenplay for the film What We Have Left, directed by Sergio Navarretta, with Frank Canino. The film stars Barabara Williams, R. H. Thomson, Tommie- Amber Pirie, and Peter MacNeill.

As of 2025, Piccione is set to write and produce an as-yet-announced limited series, among other film projects, under S.N.A.P. Films Inc.
