= Sergio Navarretta =

Film director

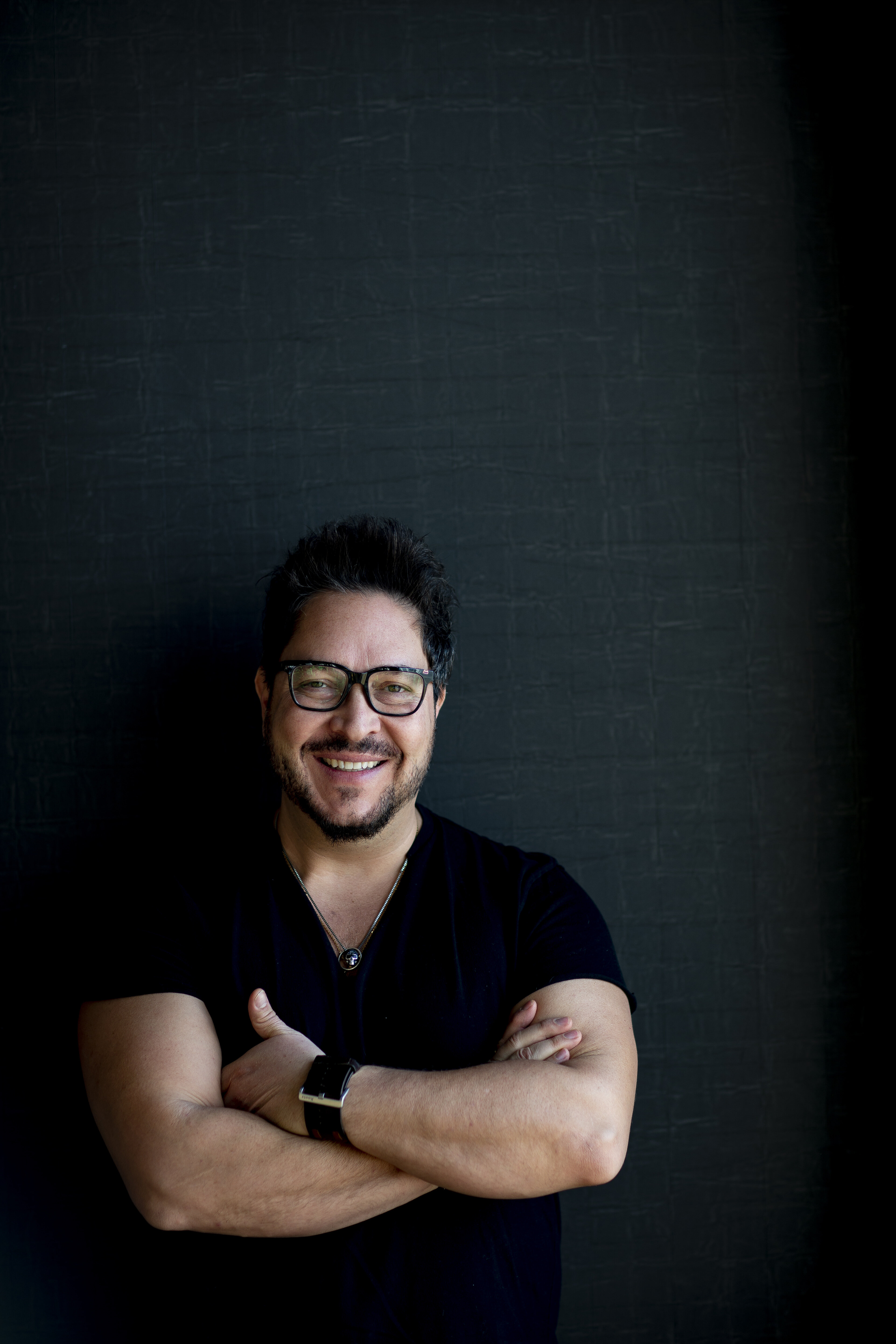
Navarretta in 2019

Sergio Navarretta is a film director who draws inspiration from Italian cinema. Navarretta is best known for The Cuban and the feature film, Looking for Angelina, based on the true-life story of Angelina Napolitano. The International Women of the World in Bologna, Italy, presented Navarretta with a special award on September 18, 2010, for his work on Looking for Angelina. Navarretta is a co-founder of S.N.A.P. Films Inc., along with his partner Alessandra Piccione. He has been featured in Time Magazine, on Fox News, NPR to name a few.

Navarretta has directed several other projects, including the short film Serena DeBergerac and the award-winning Over a Small Cup of Coffee, which premiered at the Princess Cinema in Waterloo in 2000. He directed the documentary Going to the Movies, which premiered in September 2002 at the Academy of Canadian Cinema and Television screening series, and the dramatic film Il Bagno (The Bath), which premiered in June 2002 at the Toronto Italian Film Festival. In 2003, he directed another short film, Commedia, an operatic piece inspired by Commedia dell’arte characters and aerial acrobatics, which appeared on Bravo! later that year. In 2012, he directed The Fortune Cookie, which won a Best in Shorts Award and in 2014, he directed En Plein Air, which showcased at Nuit Blanche in Sault Ste. Marie, Ontario.

In 2015, Navarretta directed The Colossal Failure of the Modern Relationship, a comedy/drama shot entirely in Niagara's wine country. Starring Krista Bridges (Heroes Reborn), Enrico Colantoni (Flashpoint, Just Shoot Me), and David Cubitt (Traders, Medium). The film had its world premiere at the Niagara Integrated Film Festival, its Western Canada premiere at the Whistler Film Festival and its U.S. premiere at Sonoma International Film Festival. The film won the Castlepoint Numa Award at the ICFF festival in Toronto. Navarretta is a founding member of the Town of Innisfil's Arts, Culture, and Heritage Council and served as Vice Chair of that council for a year.

In 2015, he was an executive producer on Arctic Dogs, the animated feature film starring Jeremy Renner, Alec Baldwin, James Franco, Heidi Klum, John Cleese, Anjelica Huston, Omar Sy, Michael Madsen, and Laurie Holden.

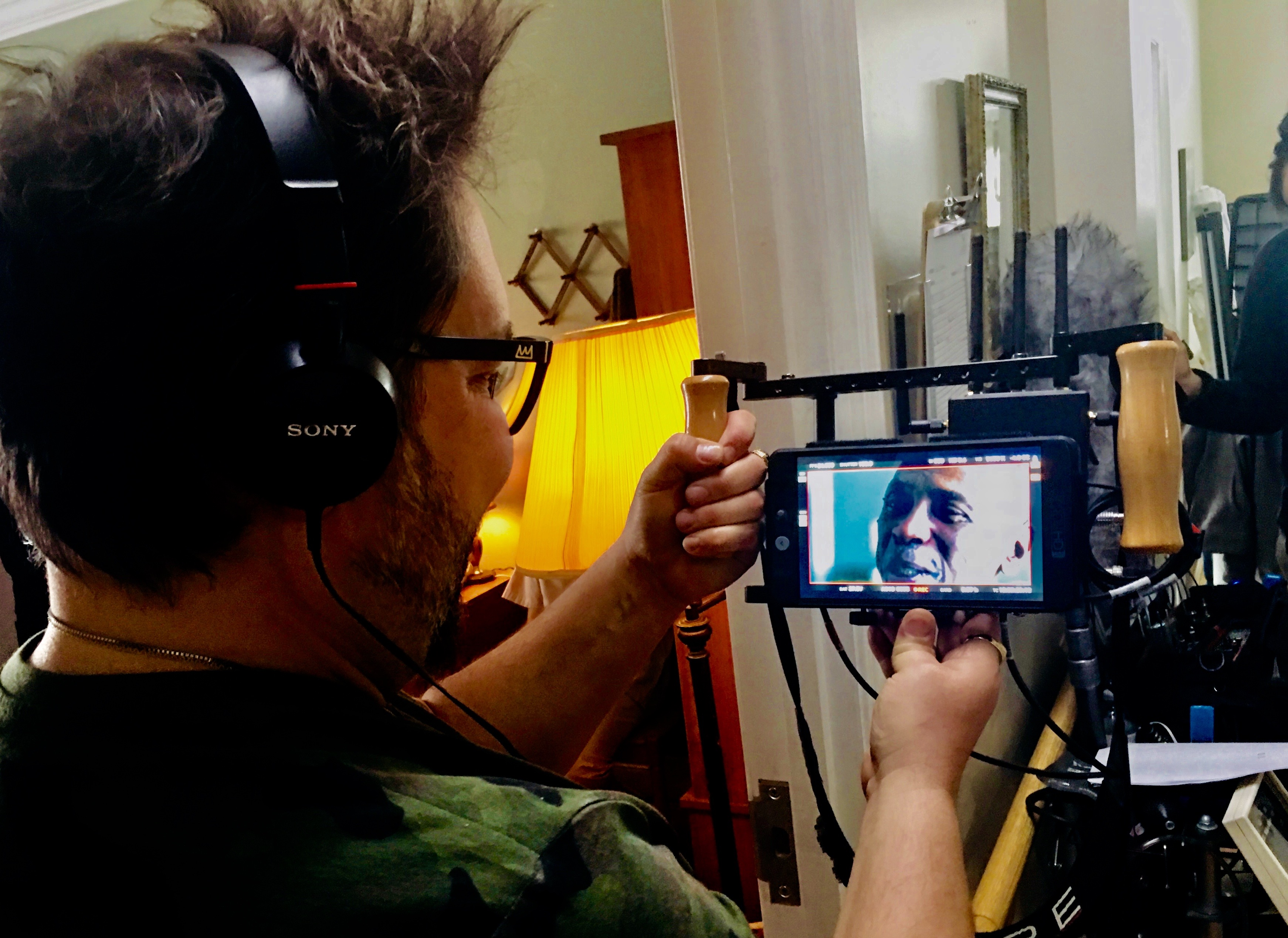

In 2018, he directed The Cuban, starring Oscar winner Louis Gossett Jr. and Shohreh Aghdashloo. The film, shot in Brantford and Brant County in southern Ontario through mid-May, also stars Degrassi: Next Class actress Ana Golja, Giacomo Gianniotti, and Lauren Holly.

In January 2022, Navarretta started a podcast titled Creativity Unleashed. Navarretta directed a film titled Loathe Thy Neighbour which premiered in August of 2025 at TIFF. In 2026, Navarretta started post production on his latest film What We Have Left, directed from a screenplay by Alessandra Piccione and Frank Canino. The film stars Barabara Williams, R. H. Thomson, Tommie- Amber Pirie, and Peter MacNeill.

Navarretta has a background in music from the Royal Conservatory of Music and is a member of the DGC (Directors Guild of Canada). He served as a mentor in this year's Being Black in Toronto initiative and is teaching a masterclass for Reel Works in New York City, whose mission is to empower undeserved youth. Navarretta has been invited to contribute to panels and public forums for organizations such as: The Academy of Film and Television; WIFT; TIFF; and FOLCS (New York).

== Selected filmography ==
- Lamborghini - The Legend
- The Cuban
- Trading Paint
- The Fortune Cookie (Short)
- Arctic Justice
- Bent
- Andron
- The Colossal Failure of the Modern Relationship
- En Plein Air II (Short)
- Serena DeBergerac (Short)
- Looking for Angelina
- Commedia (Short)
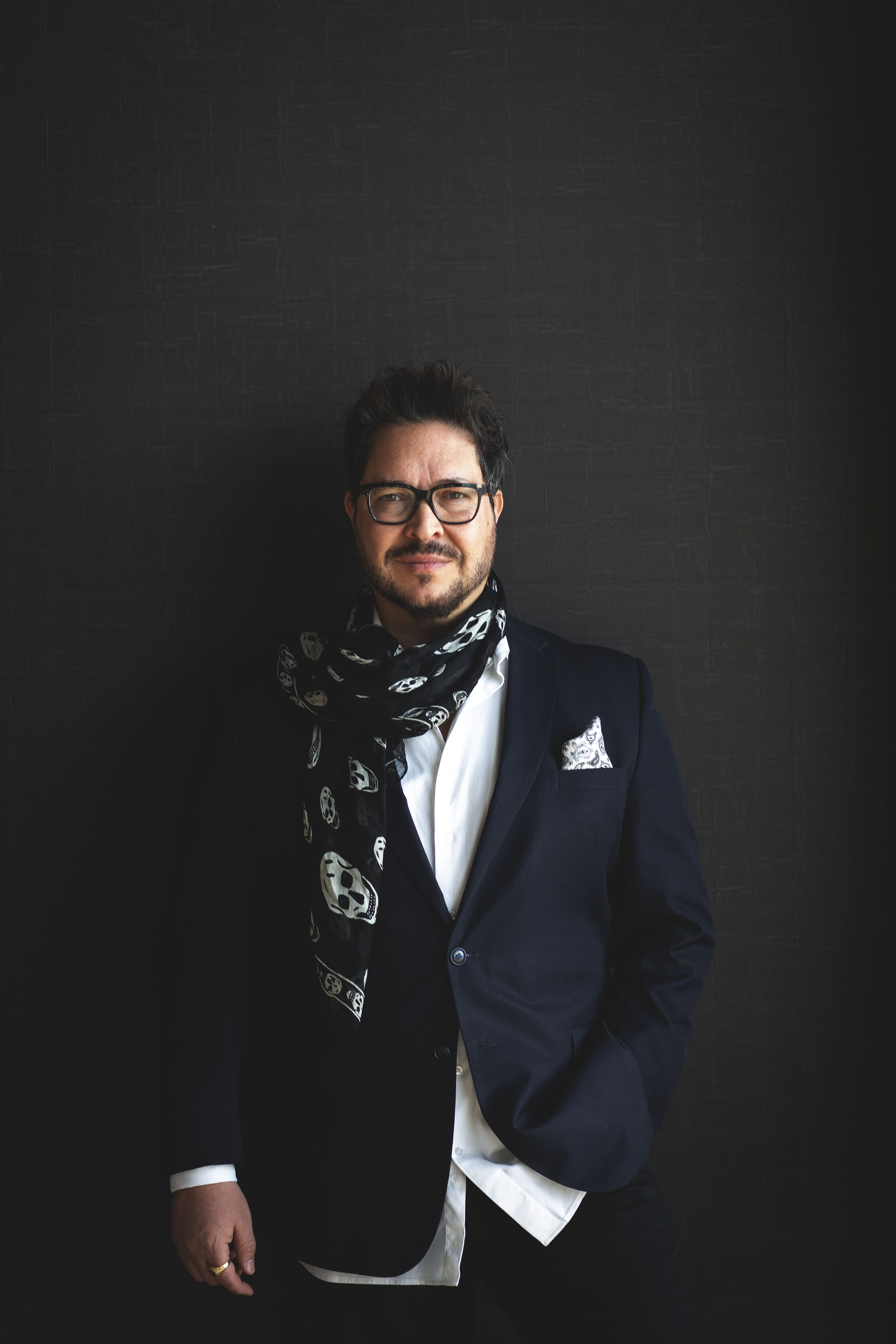

== Awards and nominations ==
- Best Shorts Competition 2012 – Winner of Award of Merit for "The Fortune Cookie"
- Italian Contemporary Film Festival 2015 – Winner of Castlepoint Numa Award for the production of "The Colossal Failure of the Modern Relationship"
- nominated for 2 CSA awards in Canada for The Cuban
- ran an Oscar nomination race for The Cuban (Top 50 according to Variety Magazine)
