= Brooke Palsson =

Canadian actress, singer-songwriter (born 1993)

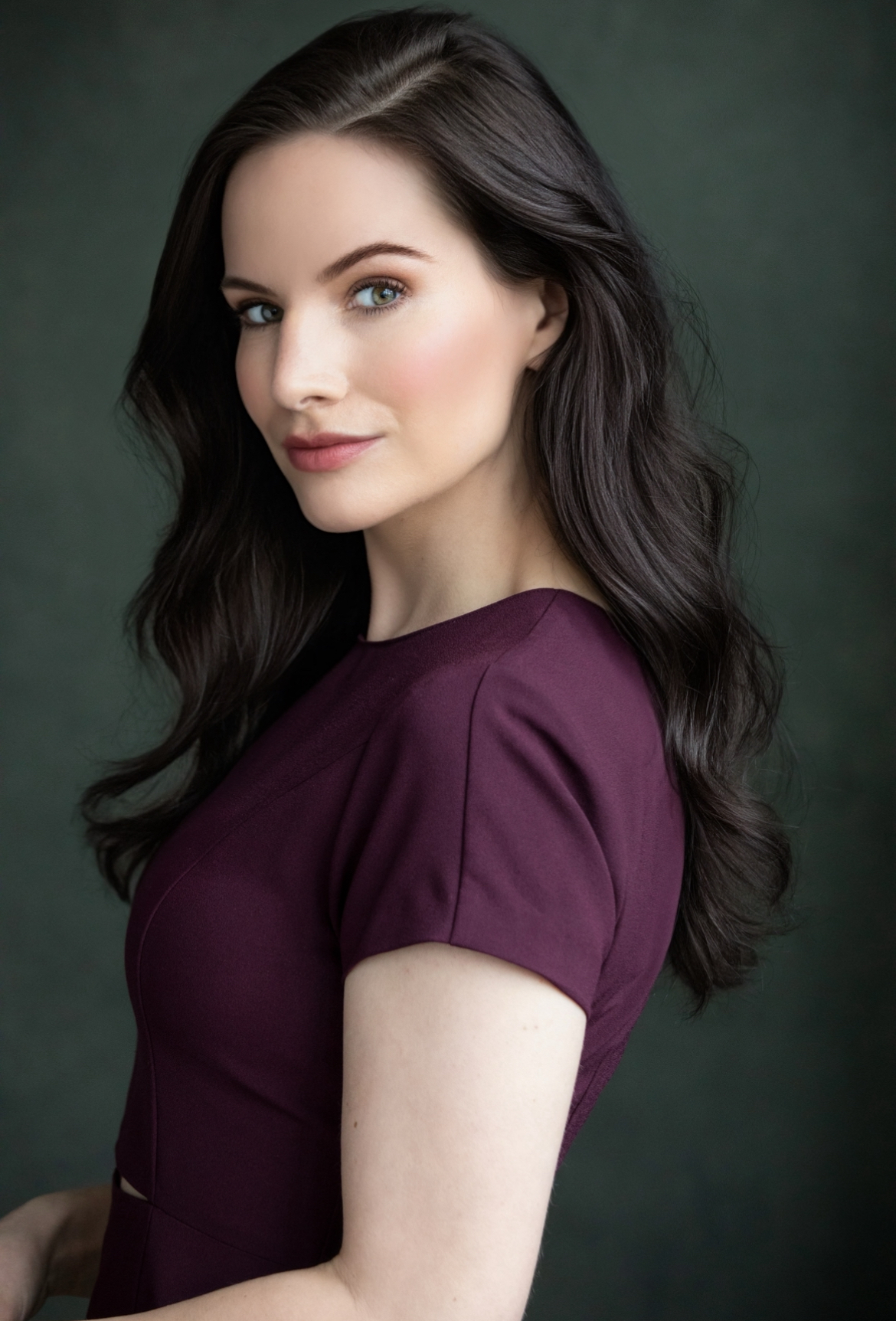
- Born: 23 April 1993 (age 33); Winnipeg, Manitoba, Canada
- Occupations: Actress; singer-songwriter
- Years active: 2002–present
- Known for: Between
- Spouse: Fuad Ahmed

Brooke Palsson (born 23 April 1993) is a Canadian actress and singer-songwriter. She was born in Winnipeg, Manitoba, Canada. She is known for Less Than Kind (2008), Euphoria (2013), Keyhole (2012) and The Colossal Failure of the Modern Relationship (2014). She won the 2011 Canadian Comedy Award for Best Performance by a Female on television for her work on Less Than Kind. Her first EP was titled The Willow. She played Melissa Day on the City / Netflix show Between.

She performed during the 2015 Pan American Games in Toronto's Distillery District.

== Filmography ==
=== Film ===
| Year | Title | Role | Notes |
|---|---|---|---|
| 2006 | Halley's Comet | Girl | Short |
| 2011 | Rusted Pyre | Sally | Short |
| 2011 | Keyhole | Denny | |
| 2012 | Elijah the Prophet | Levy Family Member | Short |
| 2013 | Molly Maxwell | Caitlin | |
| 2013 | Euphoria | Michelle | |
| 2015 | The Colossal Failure of the Modern Relationship | Amy | |
| 2023 | Polarized | Singer | |

=== Television ===
| Year | Title | Role | Notes |
|---|---|---|---|
| 2002 | Christmas Rush | Melanie Morgan | TV film |
| 2004 | While I Was Gone | Jo Beckett's Daughter | TV film |
| 2007 | Eye of the Beast | Larissa Connor | TV film |
| 2008–2013 | Less Than Kind | Miriam Goldstein | Main role |
| 2011 | Todd and the Book of Pure Evil | Ariel | "Simply the Beast" |
| 2012 | Flashpoint | May Dalton | "Broken Peace" |
| 2013 | Saving Hope | Katie | "I Watch Death" |
| 2014 | Rookie Blue | Meghan Kelly | "All by Her Selfie" |
| 2015 | Between | Melissa Day | Main role |
| 2016 | Orphan Black | Elle | "The Antisocialism of Sex" |
| 2016 | Lost & Found Music Studios | | "Take Control", "Let It Go" |
| 2021 | How to Find Forever | Rachel Richards | TV film |
| 2022 | Workin' Moms | Nina | 4 episodes |
