= Charlotte (2021 film) =

2021 animated biographical drama film

- Film poster
- Directed by: Éric Warin; Tahir Rana
- Written by: Erik Rutherford; David Bezmozgis
- Story by: Erik Rutherford
- Based on: Life? or Theatre? by Charlotte Salomon
- Produced by: Julia Rosenberg; Jérôme Dopffer; Eric Goossens; Anton Roebbens
- Starring: Keira Knightley; Brenda Blethyn; Jim Broadbent; Sam Claflin; Henry Czerny; Eddie Marsan; Helen McCrory; Sophie Okonedo; Mark Strong
- Edited by: Roderick Deogrades; Sam Patterson
- Music by: Michelino Bisceglia
- Production companies: January Films; Serendipity Point Films; Telefilm Canada; CBC Films; Sons of Manual; Les Productions Balthazar; Centre National du Cinéma et de l’Image Animée; Ontario Creates; Screen Flanders; Région Nouvelle-Aquitaine; Flanders Audiovisual Fund; Walking the Dog
- Distributed by: Elevation Pictures (Canada); Nour Films (France); The Searchers (Belgium)
- Release dates: 13 September 2021 (TIFF); 22 April 2022 (Canada); 9 November 2022 (France)
- Running time: 92 minutes
- Countries: Canada; Belgium; France
- Language: English
- Budget: US$14 million

Charlotte is a 2021 animated biographical drama film about German painter Charlotte Salomon, directed by Éric Warin and Tahir Rana, from a screen story by Erik Rutherford and a screenplay by Rutherford and David Bezmozgis, inspired by Salomon's autobiographical painting series, Life? or Theatre?. It stars the voices of Keira Knightley, Brenda Blethyn, Jim Broadbent, Sam Claflin, Henry Czerny, Eddie Marsan, Helen McCrory (in her final appearance), Sophie Okonedo and Mark Strong. Knightley, Marion Cotillard, and Xavier Dolan serve as executive producers. Cotillard also voiced Salomon in the French version of the film. Charlotte is an international co-production between Canada, Belgium and France.

The film made its world premiere at the Toronto International Film Festival on 13 September 2021. It was released in Canada on 22 April 2022 and in France on 9 November 2022.

== Plot ==
A young artist, Charlotte Salomon, and her family attend an opera in 1935 Berlin. Members of the Nazi party interrupt her stepmother Paula's performance and attempt to expel Jewish attendees. Charlotte thinks that her maternal grandparents are correct to depart for Rome, though her father Albert and Paula desire to remain in Germany. Charlotte paints a scene of the conductor ordering the Nazis to depart.

While visiting her grandparents, Charlotte befriends an American woman, Ottilie Moore, at the Sistine Chapel. Ottilie offers her home at the Cote d'Azure as refuge to the family. Despite her parents' desire that she become a seamstress, Charlotte is accepted into the Academy of Fine Arts, where she develops her expressionist style.

She also befriends and romances Alfred Wolfsohn, Paula's vocal teacher, who comforts her after her expulsion and asks her to illustrate his wartime memoirs. The two spend the day together in Wannsee, only for Charlotte to learn that Alfred has a fiancée. Kristallnacht happens that evening, during which Charlotte's paintings are burned and Jewish residents are rounded up.

Albert is sent to the Sachsenhausen concentration camp and returns to the family two months later. Albert and Paula obtain an exit visa for Charlotte by claiming that her grandparents are ill, and Charlotte is sent to France to live with Ottilie and her grandparents. Charlotte learns that her grandmother is increasingly mentally unwell. Charlotte falls in love with the groundskeeper Alexander Nagler, though her grandfather decides to move the three of them to Nice after he finds out. Charlotte's grandmother commits suicide, after which her grandfather admits that both Charlotte's mother and aunt killed themselves.

Charlotte returns to Ottilie's home where she confides in Alexander her family's history of mental illness and her desire to paint her life. Six weeks after she begins the project, Ottilie takes the young refugees who reside with her to America. She offers for Charlotte and Alexander to join her, but Charlotte returns to Nice as her visa is dependent on staying with her increasingly abusive grandfather. She eventually poisons him by putting Veronal in his dinner.

Charlotte, now pregnant by Alexander, continues to paint. Alexander outs himself as a Jew to marry Charlotte. She gives her collection of paintings, which she has titled Life? Or Theatre? to the village doctor, Dr. Moridis, for safekeeping. Shortly after, the couple is taken away by Nazis.

The epilogue informs the audience that Charlotte and Alexander were both killed in Auschwitz. Paintings from Life? Or Theatre? are interspersed with footage of the Salomons and Ottilie.

== Cast ==
- Keira Knightley as Charlotte Salomon
- Brenda Blethyn as Grossmama
- Jim Broadbent as Grosspapa
- Sam Claflin as Alexander Nagler
- Henry Czerny as Dr. Moridius/Policeman #2/Security Guard
- Eddie Marsan as Albert Salomon
- Helen McCrory as Paula Salomon-Lindberg
- Sophie Okonedo as Ottile Moore
- Mark Strong as Alfred Wolfsohn
- Pippa Bennett-Warner as Barbara
- Raoul Bhaneja as Professor Koch/Brown Shirt Leader/Looter #1/SS Soldier No. 1
- Julian Richings as Dr. Kurt Singer/Policeman #1/SS Soldier No. 2
- Tony Nappo as Mr. Brahvi/Vatican Guard

== Production ==
=== Development ===
Producer Julia Rosenberg fell in love with Charlotte Salomon as an artist at the age of 13 when she was first given a collection of her work, "Life? or Theatre?". While jogging one morning in 2011, Rosenberg had an idea that if Salomon drew her life story as a painting series, then she had to produce an animated dramatic film. Rosenberg then sent an email to the Charlotte Salomon Foundation, and that's how the project started. In May 2012, Rosenberg officially optioned Salomon's memoir, "Life? or Theatre?".

The film was originally announced in 2016 as a project to be directed by Bibo Bergeron, and written by Erik Rutherford and Miriam Toews. The screenplay was developed over a four-year period by Erik Rutherford before David Bezmozgis came on and joined in collaboration. The Charlotte Salomon Foundation had script approvals.

An international co-production between Canada, Belgium, and France, the film was produced by Canada's January Films and Sons of Manual, in co-production with Belgium's Walking the Dog, and France's Les Productions Balthazar, in association with Telefilm Canada, Trinity Media Financing, Umedia, Serendipity Point Films, Centre National du Cinéma et de l’Image Animée, Eurimages, Crave, CBC Films, Ontario Creates, Screen Flanders, Région Nouvelle-Aquitaine, and Flanders Audiovisual Fund.

In July 2021, it was announced that the cast included Keira Knightley, Brenda Blethyn, Jim Broadbent, Sam Claflin, Henry Czerny, Eddie Marsan, Helen McCrory, Sophie Okonedo and Mark Strong, with Marion Cotillard and Romain Duris set to voice a French-language version of the film. Warin and Rana directed from a screenplay by Erik Rutherford and David Bezmozgis, with Knightley, Cotillard, Xavier Dolan, and Nancy Grant set to executive produce, with Elevation Pictures set to distribute in Canada, Diaphana Distribution in France, and The Searchers in Belgium.

The film's original version is in English. Keira Knightley was recorded before animation. Marion Cotillard (who voiced Charlotte Salomon in the French version) came on afterwards and recorded with the final film. Cotillard had previously worked with executive producers Xavier Dolan and Nancy Grant in the 2016 film It's Only the End of the World. Cotillard told French magazine L'Obs that she had never heard of Charlotte Salomon until Grant approached her for this project. Grant gave Cotillard a book of Salomon's paintings and she felt moved by the artist's work.

== Release ==
It had its world premiere at the Toronto International Film Festival on 13 September 2021. In December 2021, Good Deed Entertainment acquired North American distribution rights to the film, and gave it a limited release in the United States on 22 April 2022.

The film had a limited theatrical release in Canada on 22 April 2022 by Elevation Pictures. It was released in France on 9 November 2022 by Nour Films.

== Reception ==
On the review aggregator website Rotten Tomatoes, the film received a 71% approval rating, based on 49 reviews, with an average rating of 6.4/10. The website's consensus reads, "While it lacks the spark of its subject's remarkable work, Charlotte offers a worthy introduction to a remarkable – albeit tragic – real-life story." On Metacritic, the film received a score of 58 out of 100, based on 16 critic reviews, indicating "mixed or average reviews".

AlloCiné, a French cinema site, gave the film an average rating of 3.4/5, based on a survey of 13 French reviews.

In December 2021, the film was named to TIFF's annual year-end Canada's Top Ten list of the best Canadian films of 2021.

== Awards and nominations ==
Year	Award / Film Festival	Category	Recipient(s)	Result	Ref.
2021	23rd Jerusalem Jewish Film Festival	Schoumann Award – International Competition	Éric Warin & Tahir Rana	Nominated	
2021	40th Vancouver International Film Festival	M/A/D (Music/Art/Design) Audience Award	Éric Warin & Tahir Rana	Won	
2022	46th Annecy International Animation Film Festival	Best Feature Film	Éric Warin & Tahir Rana	Nominated	
2022	12th Canadian Cinema Editors Awards	Best Editing in Animation	Roderick Deogrades & Sam Patterson	Won	
2022	10th Canadian Screen Awards	Adapted Screenplay	David Bezmozgis & Erik Rutherford	Nominated	
2022	Writers Guild of Canada Screenwriting Awards	Feature Film	David Bezmozgis & Erik Rutherford	Nominated	
