= Mazin Elsadig =

Canadian actor

- Born: Mazin Elfadil Elsadig; September 2, 1987 (age 39); Chicago, Illinois, U.S.
- Occupation: Actor
- Years active: 2004–present

Mazin Elfadil Elsadig (born September 2, 1987) is an American-born Canadian actor of Sudanese heritage. He had a role in the 2007 Disney Channel Original Movie Jump In! and later joined the cast of the CTV/The N teen drama Degrassi: The Next Generation as Damian Hayes, for the show's sixth and seventh seasons, from 2006 to 2008. Elsadig also appeared on the stage play in Marcia Johnson's Late in 2008. He is also the voice of Broseph on the Teletoon animated series Stoked. He is also known for his affiliation with Canadian rapper and singer Drake and wrote the single "Pianist Hands (Interlude)" for Drake's debut mixtape Room for Improvement, which was released in 2006.

In 2009 The Nightingale Company, the studio of television producer Debbie Nightingale, announced the development of Us and Them, a television comedy series which would have starred Drake and Elsadig, although the series was never completed.

== Filmography ==
Film and television roles
Year	Title	Role	Notes
2005	The Perfect Man	Dexter	Film; deleted scene
2006–08	Degrassi: The Next Generation	Damian Hayes	Recurring role (season 6); main role (season 7); 9 episodes
2007	Jump In!	Chuck	Television movie
2009-2013	Stoked	Broseph	Voice role; main role
2010	Uniform	Rolando	Short Film
2015	People Hold On	Darren	Film
2016	Four in the Morning	William	Main Role
