= The Betrayers (film) =

2026 Canadian drama film

- Directed by: David Bezmozgis
- Written by: David Bezmozgis; Paige Cooper
- Based on: The Betrayers by David Bezmozgis
- Produced by: Bill Marks; Anna Yatsenko; Volodymyr Yatsenko
- Starring: Michael Aronov; Simon McBurney; Tina Benko
- Cinematography: Jared Raab
- Edited by: Orlee Buium
- Music by: Anton Dehtiarov
- Production companies: ForeFilms; A71 Entertainment
- Distributed by: Vortex Media
- Release date: September 12, 2026 (TIFF)
- Running time: 90 minutes
- Country: Canada
- Language: English

The Betrayers is a Canadian-Ukrainian drama film, directed by David Bezmozgis and released in 2026. An adaptation of his own 2014 novel of the same name, the film centres on Baruch (Michael Aronov), an Israeli politician and former Soviet dissident disgraced by scandal, who takes refuge in Crimea where he unexpectedly encounters Volodya (Simon McBurney), the man who originally betrayed him to the KGB many years earlier.

The cast also includes Kaelen Ohm and Tina Benko, as well as Roxanna Hope Radja, Elan Even, Aharon Jinjihashvili, Shauna MacDonald, Tara Nicodemo, Alex Ozerov-Meyer, Viktorija Portnova, Ronan Quiniou and Trudy Weiss in supporting roles.

== Distribution ==
The film premiered in the Centrepiece program at the 2026 Toronto International Film Festival.

== Critical response ==
For That Shelf, Rachel West wrote that "Bezmozgis’ ownership of the story works in his favour. He focuses on the key points of his novel and translates them to the screen with precision. At times, the film feels akin to a John le Carré novel, demonstrating a keen understanding of when to pull back and when to hold onto a moment. The characters leap from the page while retaining the fullness they have in the novel."
