= Erik Rutherford =

Canadian writer

Erik Rutherford is a Canadian writer. He wrote the screen story for the 2021 film Charlotte and was cowriter with David Bezmozgis of the screenplay, for which they received a Canadian Screen Award nomination for Best Adapted Screenplay at the 10th Canadian Screen Awards in 2022, and a Writers Guild of Canada nomination for Best Feature at the 26th WGC Screenwriting Awards.

From 2009 to 2014, Rutherford was chief editor of Canadian online magazine Ryeberg Curated Video, which invited notable "novelists or artists or professional critics" to write essays with embedded video clips. Contributors included Mary Gaitskill, Lynn Crosbie, Sheila Heti, Bert Archer, Kevin Chong, Russell Smith (writer), Sholem Krishtalka, and Claudia Dey.

The Canadian writer Miriam Toews is Rutherford's partner.
