= Angelina Napolitano =

Canadian murderer (1882–1932)

- Murder defendant Angelina Napolitano as she appeared in the press at the time of her 1911 trial
- Born: March 12, 1882 near Naples, Italy
- Died: September 4, 1932 (aged 50); Hotel Dieu Hospital, Frontenac County, Ontario, Canada
- Occupation: Homemaker
- Status: Deceased
- Motive: Spousal abuse
- Conviction: Murder
- Penalty: Death; commuted to life imprisonment

Details
- Date apprehended: April 16, 1911

Angelina Napolitano (March 12, 1882 – September 4, 1932) was an immigrant to Canada who murdered her abusive husband in 1911, igniting a public debate about domestic violence and the death penalty. She was the first woman in Canada to use the battered woman defense on a murder charge and brought domestic abuse to national awareness.

Napolitano was found guilty, and although the jury recommended clemency, she was sentenced to death, which led to a flood of petitions asking to have her life spared. After an international outcry, however, the Canadian federal cabinet eventually commuted her sentence to life imprisonment. She served 11 years before being paroled.

In 2005, the story of Napolitano's marriage and dramatic trial was turned into an award-winning independent film, Looking for Angelina.

== Early life and marriage ==
Angelina was born in Italy about 1883, probably in a small town not too far from Naples. Her family name is not known. She married Pietro Napolitano about 1898 and the couple emigrated to America shortly after the turn of the century. They lived in New York City for seven years and moved to Canada in 1909—first to Thessalon, Ontario, then to Sault Ste. Marie, where there was a sizable Italian immigrant community. The couple had four children.

The Napolitano marriage was not good; Pietro beat and threatened his wife. In November 1910, he attacked her with a pocket knife, stabbing her nine times in the face, neck, shoulder, chest and arms and wounding her badly. He was charged with assault, but received a suspended sentence.

== Killing ==
After her conviction, newspapers across North America gathered petition signatures calling for Napolitano's sentence to be commuted or for her to be released.

As the winter of 1910–1911 continued, Pietro, who worked on and off as a labourer, began to pressure Angelina to earn money (to build the family a house) by prostitution. On April 16, 1911, Easter Sunday, when Angelina was six months pregnant, Pietro told her to go out and make money through sex or he would beat her, kill her, or kill her unborn child. He was going to sleep and she had until he woke to get some money.

That afternoon, as Pietro slept in their top-floor apartment on James Street, Angelina took an axe and hit him four times in the neck and head, killing him. She immediately sought out a neighbour and confessed, adding "I just killed a pig", then waited for the police to come. They found her with her arms wrapped around her youngest child, and charged her with murder.

== Trial ==
The trial began on Monday, May 8, 1911, in Sault Ste. Marie, with Justice Byron Moffatt Britton presiding and Edmund Meredith as the crown attorney. When the court realized that Napolitano did not have a lawyer, the trial was adjourned for a day to allow the court-appointed lawyer, Uriah McFadden, to prepare a case.

When the trial resumed on Tuesday, May 9, Meredith called nine witnesses to testify to Napolitano's guilt. McFadden called only Angelina herself, who did not speak English well. McFadden's case rested on what was essentially the battered woman defense; he argued that Pietro's abuse had forced a desperate Angelina to murder, and cited the November stabbing. Britton, however, ruled the incident inadmissible evidence, arguing that "if anybody injured six months ago could give that as justification or excuse for slaying a person, it would be anarchy complete".

The jury returned a guilty verdict. The trial had lasted only three hours. Although the jury recommended clemency, Britton sentenced her to hang because murder required a mandatory death sentence. The execution was scheduled for August 9, one month after Napolitano's due date.

== Reaction and aftermath ==
Napolitano's pregnancy at the time of sentencing was emphasized, helping to make her an international cause célèbre.

Once the story hit the newspapers, however, a media frenzy began—not just in Sault Ste. Marie, but especially in the United States and even Europe. Though some of the coverage was negative, arguing from racist stereotypes that Napolitano, as an Italian, was a "hot-blooded foreigner" and deserved to pay the penalty for her crime, most of it revolved around those sympathetic to the abuse she had suffered, and agitating for her sentence to be commuted to jail time or even a pardon. The federal minister of justice, Sir Allen Bristol Aylesworth, received many letters from individuals (including McFadden), as well as petitions organized by groups in Sault Ste Marie, Toronto, New York City, Chicago, England, Austria, and Poland. A doctor in Ohio, Dr. Alexander Aalto, even offered to be hanged in Angelina's place, saying: "It would only be fair to Mrs. Napolitano for a man to give his life for her, inasmuch as her life is in peril on account of a man's persecution of her, and because men condemned her."

Dr. Aalto's remarks reflect a theme among Napolitano's supporters, who included women in the fledgling feminist movement. These early feminists argued that Pietro's beatings meant the murder was in self-defense, and that Britton was being sexist when he threw out the evidence of abuse. The British suffragette journal Common Cause excoriated not only the law that had condemned Angelina, but also the justice system that upheld it as "both bad, for they are exclusively masculine".

Other arguments presented in the letters included the idea (put forward by the area's MP, Arthur Cyril Boyce) that Angelina must be not guilty because her pregnancy made her temporarily insane, and the argument that Napolitano's fear of her impending doom would adversely affect her unborn baby, therefore she should be pardoned. This last was a common psychological view at the time.

Whether any of these arguments had an impact, the federal cabinet eventually did commute Angelina's sentence to life imprisonment on July 14, 1911.

Napolitano's later life is not well known. She did give birth, but the baby died within a few weeks. Her older children were placed in foster homes. She was granted parole on December 30, 1922, after serving 11 years at Kingston Penitentiary. Napolitano reportedly died on September 4, 1932, at the Hotel Dieu Hospital in Frontenac County, Ontario.

== Film ==
In 2003, independent film director Sergio Navarretta began researching Angelina's life for a documentary, but expanded the project into a feature film "once we realized how dramatic the facts were". The film, Looking for Angelina, was shot in two weeks in 2004 in Sault Ste. Marie, on a shoestring budget of $250,000. The writers, Alessandra Piccione and Frank Canino, took inspiration from Canino's play The Angelina Project. Lina Giornofelice starred as Angelina, with Alvaro D'Antonio playing Pietro. For authenticity, large parts of the film are in period-correct Italian with English subtitles.

The film showed at the Montreal World Film Festival, Cinéfest in Sudbury, Quitus Italian Film Festival in Montreal, Shadows of the Mind Festival in Sault Ste Marie, the International Film Festival of India, Cimameriche Film Festival in Genoa and the Mumbai International Film Festival. "In general", said director Navaretta, "audiences have responded to the film on an emotional level, empathizing with the journey of [the characters]." Looking For Angelina won three awards: A Special Recognition at the Cimameriche Film Festival and Best Feature (Drama) and Quitus Award of Distinction at the Quietus Film Festival in Montreal.

== Domestic violence campaign ==
The film Looking For Angelina includes a domestic violence awareness campaign component. The film's producers, Platinum Image Film, often screened the movie before a panel discussion of domestic violence experts, or put on screenings to raise money for organizations such as the Shelter from the Storm Campaign.

As of October 2008, the film DVD sells packaged with a 114-page companion book, Child Abuse Prevention and Intervention, written by Toronto community agency BOOST. The book is intended to help teachers help children learn about and prevent family violence.

== See also ==
- Domestic violence
- Capital punishment in Canada
- Sault Ste. Marie
