= Victoria Day (film) =

- Directed by: David Bezmozgis
- Written by: David Bezmozgis
- Produced by: Judy Holm; Michael McNamara
- Starring: Mark Rendall; Holly Deveaux; Sergiy Kotelenets; Nataliya Alyexeyenko; John Mavrogiannis; Scott Beaudin
- Cinematography: David Franco
- Edited by: Roderick Deogrades
- Music by: Lesley Barber
- Production company: Markham Street Films
- Distributed by: Maximum Film Distribution
- Release date: January 17, 2009 (Sundance Film Festival)
- Running time: 87 minutes
- Country: Canada
- Languages: English; Russian

Victoria Day is a 2009 Canadian independent film directed by David Bezmozgis and produced by Markham Street Films. The film stars Mark Rendall in the lead role, as well as Holly Deveaux, Sergiy Kotelenets, Nataliya Alyexeyenko, John Mavrogiannis, and Scott Beaudin.

== Plot ==
The film's story takes place the week preceding the Victoria Day long weekend in Toronto, the year of 1988. The story line depicts the weeklong journey of a sixteen-year-old ordinary teenage boy, Ben Spektor, and the conspiring events that sequence to a coming-of-age story.

The film begins on Sunday May 19, 1988. The Victoria Day weekend is fast approaching, initiating the coming end of another high school year. The attention of characters first seems to rest on the Stanley Cup finals, which are in play in Boston with Wayne Gretzky's Edmonton Oilers facing the Boston Bruins. Since Ben Spektor's life is mostly centered on hockey, he is portrayed as the star player of his Toronto Red Wings minor hockey league team, resembling the skills of a young Gretzky throughout the film's opening scenes. However, a life-altering event changes the course of Ben's path as he attends a Bob Dylan concert alongside his juvenile close friends: Sammy and Noah. While there, Ben spots Jordan Chapman, his classmate, hockey teammate, and tormentor, taking part in what appears to be a routine drug deal. Being short of five dollars to purchase the drugs, Jordan provokes Ben into reluctantly spotting him the remainder. This critical affair seemed hardly significant to Ben at the time— he could not have foreseen the life-altering consequences this event would have on his future.

As the days pass, Jordan's whereabouts are a mystery, and the city police organize a search party that is ultimately fruitless. With a guilty conscience and the fear of Jordan's disappearance, the days drag on for Ben. However, the sequence of events initiate a budding romance for Ben and Jordan's fifteen-year-old sister, Cayla. From love and romance, to the future of Ben's hockey career, Ben's adolescent life appears to be promising. Yet, the continuous discomfort of his teammate's disappearance preoccupies Ben's life, drastically altering the determined path of his promising future.

== Cast ==
- Mark Rendall as Ben Spektor
- Sergiy Kotelenets as Yuri Spektor
- Nataliya Alyexeyenko as Mila Spektor
- Mitchell Amaral as Jordan Chapman
- Holly Deveaux as Cayla Chapman
- John Mavro as Sammy Balaban
- Scott Beaudin as Noah Hartsman
- Greta Onieogou as Sara
- Melanie Leishman as Melanie
- Duane Murray as Coach Ken
- Jeff Pustil as Jerry Chapman
- Scotty Cook as Tim Wilson
- Brendan Price as Brad McCoulough

== Reception ==
A lot of suburban Toronto is depicted in the film, including city landmarks like Ontario Place. Since the film is set in Canada and named after a Canadian public holiday, there are definite illustrations of the life of a teenage boy in Canada. Regardless of these distinct references, Bezmozgis states, "I didn't set out to make a film that is distinctly Canadian, I set out to make a movie that reflected my experience of growing up, and it just happened to be in Toronto. It's an experience that could have happened for the most part in Chicago, or New York, Boston or Los Angeles. It happened to take place in Toronto, so there are elements that are specific to Toronto, but the story itself is like any teenage story in North America."

Finally, the film was featured at the 2009 Sundance Film Festival, in the World Dramatic Competition category. "In what amounts to a record, the movie was picked up faster for Sundance than any other Canadian film in history - enough to the point that the press kit and other promotional material had to be hastily assembled."

According to John Anderson of Variety "The hero of Victoria Day doesn't quite come of age, but he realizes he'll have to in writer-helmer David Bezmozgis' tale of late-'80s Toronto teenagers -- one of whom disappears like Amelia Earhart, endowing this Canadian production with an undercurrent of apprehension".

== Accolades ==
Year	Award	Category	Result
2009	Genie Awards	Best Original Screenplay: David Bezmozgis	Nominated
2009	San Francisco Jewish Film Festival	Film Presented	Nominated
2009	Sundance Film Festival	World Dramatic Competition	Nominated
2009	Toronto Jewish Film Festival	Film Presented	
2009	Athens International Film Festival	Film Presented	
