= Natasha and Other Stories =

Book by David Bezmozgis

- Author: David Bezmozgis
- Language: English
- Genre: Short story collection
- Publisher: HarperCollins (Canada); Farrar, Straus and Giroux (US)
- Publication date: 2004
- Publication place: Canada
- Media type: Print (paperback)
- Pages: 147 pp
- ISBN: 0-00-200568-9 (HarperCollins); ISBN 978-0-374-28141-0 (Farrar, Straus and Giroux)
- OCLC: 54065062

Natasha and Other Stories (ISBN 0-374-28141-6) is a collection of short stories by Canadian author David Bezmozgis. His first published book, Natasha was published in 2004. Stories from the collection first appeared in The New Yorker, Harper's and Zoetrope All-Story.

The book is a collection of linked stories about the Bermans, a Jewish family from Latvia adapting to their new life as immigrants to Canada. The central character is Mark Berman, who is a young child when the family first arrives in Canada.

The title story was adapted by Bezmozgis into the 2015 film Natasha.

== Awards and nominations ==
Natasha and Other Stories won the Danuta Gleed Literary Award in 2005, and was nominated for the 2004 Governor General's Award for English fiction and the Guardian First Book Award.

The book was also chosen for inclusion in Canada Reads 2007, where it was championed by Steven Page.
