= What We Have =

- Directed by: Maxime Desmons
- Written by: Maxime Desmons
- Produced by: Maxime Desmons; Damon D'Oliveira; Sally Karam
- Starring: Maxime Desmons; Roberta Maxwell; Alex Ozerov; Kristen Thomson
- Cinematography: Daniel Grant
- Edited by: Kye Meechan
- Music by: Elizabeth Dehler
- Release date: September 18, 2014 (Cinéfest)
- Running time: 89 minutes
- Country: Canada
- Languages: English; French

What We Have (French: Ce qu'on a) is a Canadian drama film, written and directed by Maxime Desmons. It was the first feature film ever made under Telefilm Canada's new microbudget funding program.

The film stars Desmons as Maurice Lesmers, a gay French expatriate living in North Bay, Ontario who takes a job tutoring Allan (Alex Ozerov), a high school student, in French while auditioning for a stage production of Molière's The Miser. Drawn to protect and defend Allan from the bullying that he faces at school for being gay, their student-teacher relationship is soon complicated when Allan falls in love with Maurice, in turn triggering Maurice's own repressed memories of childhood sexual abuse.

The film had its theatrical premiere in 2014 at the Cinéfest Sudbury International Film Festival, but wider release was delayed until 2015 due to producer Damon D'Oliveira's commitments to the promotion of the television miniseries The Book of Negroes. It won the juried award for Best Canadian Film at the 2015 Inside Out Film and Video Festival.
