= Natasha (2015 film) =

2015 film by David Bezmozgis

- Directed by: David Bezmozgis
- Written by: David Bezmozgis
- Produced by: Bill Marks; Deborah Marks
- Starring: Alex Ozerov; Sasha K. Gordon; Aidan Shipley; Lola Tash; Deanna Dezmari
- Cinematography: Guy Godfree
- Edited by: Michelle Szemberg
- Production company: Natasha Films
- Distributed by: Mongrel Media
- Release date: November 7, 2015 (BJFF)
- Running time: 93 minutes
- Country: Canada
- Languages: English; Russian
- Box office: $8,325

Natasha is a Canadian drama film, which premiered in 2015 before being released in Canada in 2016 and in the United States in 2017. The film was written and directed by David Bezmozgis, based on the title story from his 2004 short story collection Natasha and Other Stories.

== Plot ==
Mark Berman, an idealistic Jewish Canadian teenager in Toronto is seduced into a torrid affair by the mysteriously appearing but extremely ruthless Natasha, the daughter of his uncle Fima's new Russian mail-order bride who has been living a double life as a sex worker since childhood. Although the original short story took place in the 1980s, for the film Bezmozgis updated the temporal setting to the present day in order to explore the impact of contemporary technology, such as the internet, on the story.

== Cast ==
- Alex Ozerov as Mark Berman
- Sasha K. Gordon as Natasha
- Lola Tash as Jana
- Aidan Shipley as Rufus
- Deanna Dezmari as Bella
- Pavel Tsitrinel as Meyer
- Mila Kanev as Dora
- Alla Kadysh as Faina
- Igor Ovadis as Faina's uncle
- Sergiy Kotelenets as Gena
- John Mavro as Daniel
- Jonathan Purdon as older pool guy
- Grisha Pasternak as Vadim
- Joshua Teixeira as kid 1
- Kylon Howell as kid 2

== Release ==
The film premiered at the Boston Jewish Film Festival in November 2015, and was screened at several other film festivals before going into general commercial release in Canada in May 2016.

== Awards ==
The film garnered two Canadian Screen Award nominations at the 5th Canadian Screen Awards in 2017, for Best Actress (Gordon) and Best Adapted Screenplay (Bezmozgis).

== Reception ==
Natasha scored an "Extremely Fresh" rating of 100% based on 11 critical reviews on Rotten Tomatoes, with an average rating of 7.21/10. Based on 6 critics on Metacritic, Natasha has a rank of 76 out of a 100, indicating "generally favorable reviews".

Neil Genzlinger of The New York Times wrote "[the film] creates a disturbing portrait of a girl turned calculating and nihilistic by her upbringing, and there is no coyness here".

Peter Howell of Toronto Star had praised the film, saying that "[it] succeeds because of its haunting lead performances".

Variety's Jessica Kiang wrote "David Bezmozgis adapts his own short story into an impressively controlled coming of age tale animated by a cunning central performance".

According to Tatiana Craine of The Village Voice, "Natasha is as beguiling and confounding as its title character".

Tomris Laffly of RogerEbert.com said that "[the director] manages to summon something richer out of this tale you might temporarily feel you've been told before".
