= Lola Tash =

Canadian actress (born 1995)

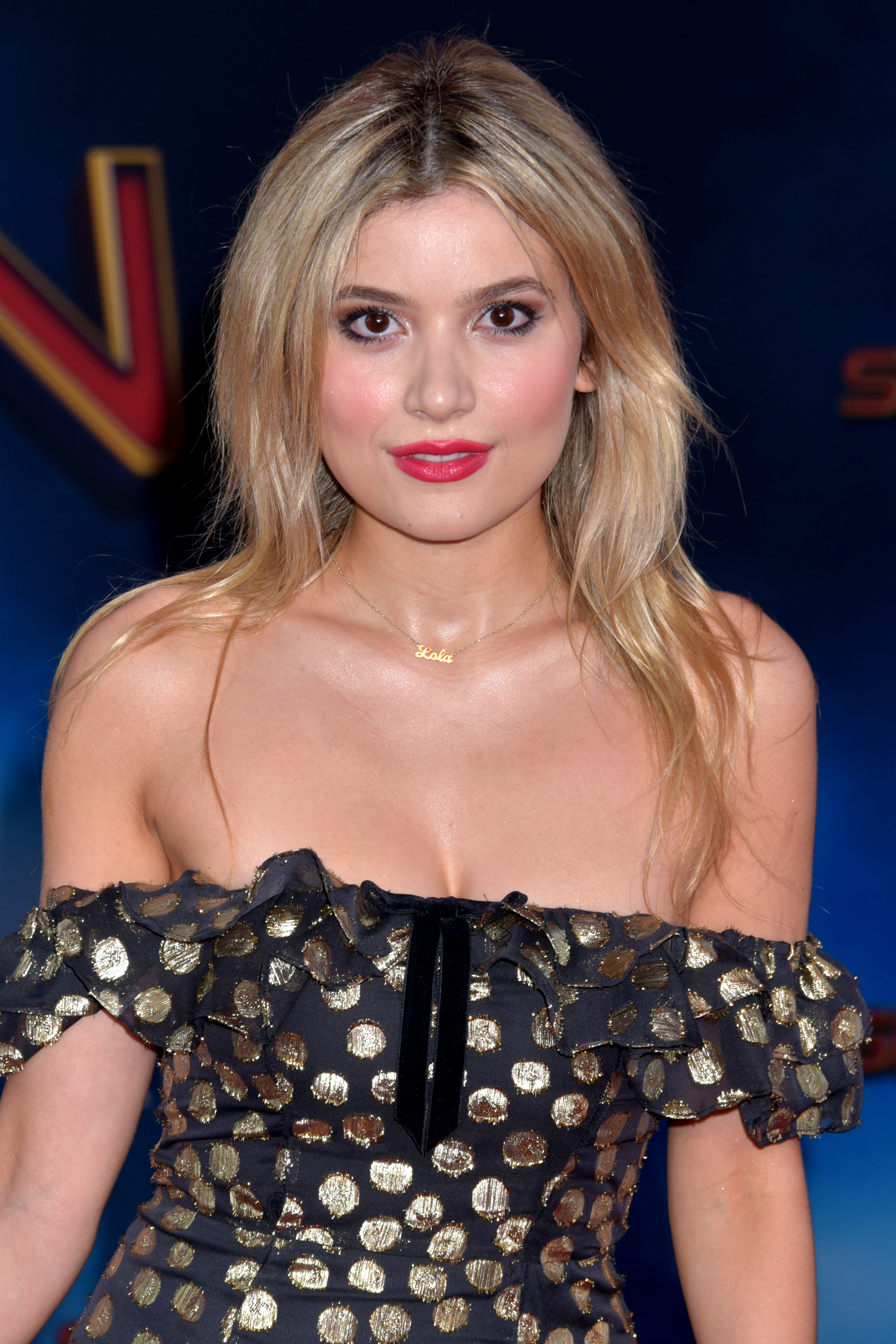
- Lola Tash arrives for the premiere of "Spider-Man: Far From Home"
- Born: September 4, 1995 (age 31)
- Occupation: Actress
- Years active: 2007-Present

Lola Bridgette Tash (born September 4, 1995) is a Canadian actress. She is best known for portraying Gisela Calicos on Connor Undercover. She starred as Chideh in the movie The Wild Girl, as Robin on Rookie Blue, Vicky in Reviving Ophelia and also guest starred as Vicky on The Latest Buzz, as well as many television commercials. Her roles have also included Natalia on Reign, Molly Maxwell in Molly Maxwell, Sloane Daniels on Republic of Doyle, Caitlyn in A Wife's Nightmare, and Mitzi in Four in the Morning. Tash is one of the owners of the "MyTherapistSays" social media account with Nicole Argiris, Nora Tash, and Gina Tash.

== Filmography ==
=== Film ===
Year	Title	Role	Notes
2013	Molly Maxwell	Molly Maxwell	
2015	After the Ball	Polly	
2015	Natasha	Jana	

=== Television ===
Year	Title	Role	Notes
2007	The Latest Buzz	Vicky Z	Episode: "The Rock Out Issue"
2010	The Wild Girl	Chideh	Television film
2010	Rookie Blue	Robin	Episode: "Honor Roll"
2010	Reviving Ophelia	Vicky	Television film
2010-2011	Connor Undercover	Gisela Calicos	Main role; 39 episodes
2013	Reign	Natalia	Episode: "Pilot"
2013-2014	Republic of Doyle	Sloan Daniels	Recurring role; 17 episodes
2014	A Wife's Nightmare	Caitlin	Television film
2016	Four in the Morning	Mitzi	Main role; 8 episodes
