= Daniel Maslany =

Canadian actor

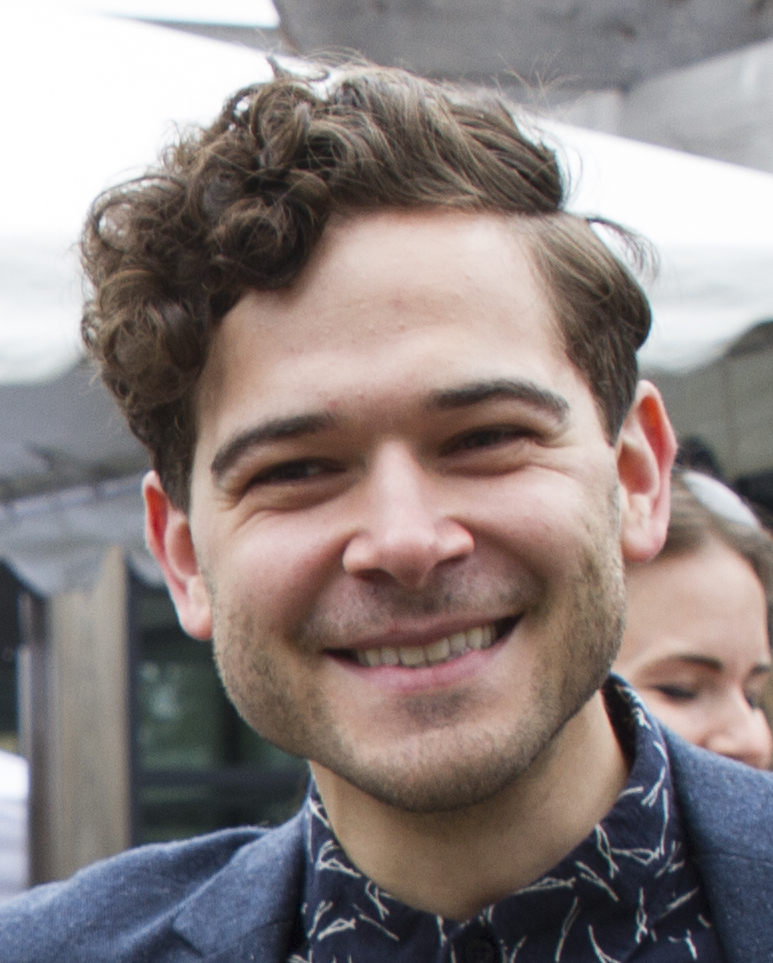
- Maslany at the 2018 CFC Annual BBQ Fundraiser
- Born: Daniel Joseph Maslany; September 17, 1988 (age 37); Regina, Saskatchewan, Canada
- Occupations: Actor, producer, composer
- Years active: 2000–present
- Known for: Four in the Morning; Impulse; Murdoch Mysteries
- Spouse: Lucy Adele Hill
- Relatives: Tatiana Maslany (sister); Brendan Hines (brother-in-law)

Daniel Joseph Maslany (born September 17, 1988) is a Canadian actor, producer and composer. He is known for playing Bondurant Smit in CBC's offbeat and absurd comedy series Four in the Morning, Llewellyn Watts in the series Murdoch Mysteries and Townes Linderman in the series Impulse on YouTube Premium.

== Early life ==
Maslany was born in Regina, Saskatchewan, the son of Daniel Maslany, a woodworker, and Renate (née Kratz), a French-English translator and interpreter. His older sister, Tatiana, is an actress too, and his younger brother, Michael, is an animator. He has Austrian, German, Polish, Romanian, and Ukrainian ancestry. As a child he participated in drawing, dance, acting, and filmmaking classes. He is a graduate of the Globe Theatre Conservatory.

== Career ==
=== Theatre ===
The solo show, O.C. Dean, written and performed by Maslany, premiered at Globe Theatre in Regina in 2013 (Globe Theatre Shumiatcher Sandbox Series), then toured to Uno Fest in Victoria in 2014.

Maslany performed in the play Stupid Fucking Bird by Aaron Posner, and in particular for the Canadian premiere in 2013. He also produced the Video Trailer. He also worked as sound, music, projection designer and co-creator of A Date with the Night at Globe Theatre in 2015.

As an actor, Maslany has played parts in Robin Hood, Peter Pan, The Alice Nocturne, A Midsummer Night's Dream, George Dandin, and Pride and Prejudice at the Globe Theatre in Regina; Rage, The Alice Nocturne, and The Story of Mr. Wright in the Globe Theatre Shumiatcher Sandbox Series; as well as Wrecked, and The Secret Life of the Octopus, as part of the Persephone Youth Tour. He also directed The Fusion Project: By Candlelight for the Globe Theatre Shumiatcher Sandbox Series.

Maslany designed the sound and music for Robin Hood and Metamorphoses at the Globe Theatre, as well as Trout Stanley at The Storefront Theatre and Shannon 10:40 for Videofag.

=== Films/television ===
Maslany made his on-screen debut in the 2000 film Skipped Parts, playing character Petey Pierce. He later appeared in several television series and films, including Renegadepress.com, Corner Gas, and Chained.

In 2016 he played Bondurant in the short-lived Toronto series Four in the Morning.

Joining the cast of the series Murdoch Mysteries in 2017, Maslany took on the character of Llewellyn Watts, a police detective.

He played Townes Linderman in the YouTube Premium series Impulse.

=== Other works ===
Daniel Maslany worked as executive producer, second assistant director and composer for the short film, Shut Up (2019). He also composed the music of the short film, 90/91 (post-production).

Maslany has also been a Combat Improv performer.

== Awards ==
Maslany won the Regina's Mayor's Arts & Business Award for Emerging Artist in 2008.

== Personal life ==
Maslany lives in Toronto, Ontario with his wife, Lucy Adele Hill, who is an actress and writer.

== Filmography ==
| Year | Title | Role | Note |
|---|---|---|---|
| 2000 | Skipped Parts | Petey Pierce | Film |
| 2003 | The Risen | Bobby "Tiger" Simms | TV film |
| 2004 | Renegadepress.com | Josh | Episodes: "The Long Way Home"; "Some of My Best Friends Are"; "Skin Deep" |
| 2005 | Moccasin Flats | Greg | Episode: Signs |
| 2005–2007 | Corner Gas | Teen / Main student / Teenage boy | Episodes: "Buzz Driver" (main student); "Fun Run" (teen); "Key to the Future" (teen); "Rock On!" (teenage boy) |
| 2008 | Moccasin Flats: Redemption | Tony | TV film |
| 2009 | The Shortcut | Ivor Hartley (1950s) | Film |
| 2010 | Wingin' It | Elliot | Episode: "Bully Elliot" |
| 2012 | Chained | Young Bob | Film |
| 2012 | InSayshable | Young businessman | |
| 2015 | The Secret Life of Marilyn Monroe | Payne Whitney Orderly | TV miniseries Episode: "Part 2" |
| 2016 | Four in the Morning | Bondurant Smit | TV series Episodes: "The Music"; "Four Christs"; "Folklore"; "Moon"; "Chemistry"; "Blow"; "Day Kids"; "Pig" |
| 2016 | Designated Survivor | Jared Abbott | Episode: "The Results" |
| 2016–present | Murdoch Mysteries | Detective Llewellyn Watts | Recurring role |
| 2017 | Frankie Drake Mysteries | Llewellyn Watts | |
| 2018 | SuperGrid | Owl | Film |
| 2018–2019 | Impulse | Townes Linderman | Main role |
| 2019 | Tokens | Dennis AD | Episodes: "Your Best Head Forward"; "Include the Kitchen Sink"; "Finding Cinderella" |
| 2019 | I Am in the World as Free and Slender as a Deer on a Plain | | Short film |
| 2019 | Lie Exposed | Jerry | Film |
| 2019 | Goliath | Parker | Film |
| 2022 | Hudson & Rex | Derek Spade | Season 5 Episode 1: "Lost In The Barrens" |
| 2023 | Essex County | Luke | Film |
| 2023 | Close to You | Michael | Main role |
| 2024 | My Dead Mom | Cole | Web series |
