= Four in the Morning (TV series) =

- Genre: Dark comedy Comedy drama Science fiction Fantasy; Magical realism
- Written by: Ira Parker
- Directed by: Pavan Moondi
- Starring: Lola Tash; Michelle Mylett; Daniel Maslany; Mazin Elsadig
- Country of origin: Canada
- Original language: English
- No. of seasons: 1
- No. of episodes: 8

Production
- Executive producers: Ari Lantos; Mark Musselman; Ira Parker; Jeff Sagansky; Matt Geller
- Running time: 22 minutes (approx.)
- Production company: Serendipity Point Films

Original release
- Network: CBC Television
- Release: August 26 – October 8, 2016

Four in the Morning is a Canadian television comedy-drama series, which premiered on CBC Television on August 26, 2016. Starring Lola Tash, Michelle Mylett, Daniel Maslany and Mazin Elsadig, the series focuses on four friends in their 20s who regularly get together at 4 a.m.

The series was produced by Robert Lantos's Serendipity Point Films, on a low budget model of $300,000 per episode. The series was not renewed for a second season.

== Development ==
Creator and show-runner Ira Parker wrote the pilot script, which was meant to feel like a play, when he was in graduate school c. 2011. He had a season mapped out in his mind and loosely based some of the characters and storylines on his own experiences. Parker was surprised that CBC picked up the show with its sex scenes, drug use, and profanity, and that the public broadcaster allowed them to make the show without creative limitations.

Parker wrote all the episodes, then spent a week with playwright Daniel Goldfarb refining the scripts for the season.

== Cast ==
- Lola Tash as Mitzi
- Michelle Mylett as Jamie
- Daniel Maslany as Bondurant Smit
- Mazin Elsadig as William Wilson

== Production ==
The producers for the project were Parker, Matt Geller, Ari Lantos, Mark Musselman and Jeff Sagansky. The series was produced by Serendipity Point Films, on a low budget model of $300,000 per episode. It was set and filmed in Toronto, including the Patrician Grill on King Street East and Massey Hall.

The series was directed by Pavan Moondi with filming beginning in April 2016. The majority of filming was done overnight, between 6 p.m. and 6 a.m. Maslany said this helped develop a surrealist mindset.

== Episodes ==
| No. | Title | Directed by | Written by | Original air date |
|---|---|---|---|---|
| 1 | "Pig" | Pavan Moondi | Ira Parker | August 26, 2016 |
Bondurant makes a romantic overture toward Jaime in front of Mitzi and William. Mitzi tells Jaime that she's having Bondurant's abortion, and tells the story of her conversation with her dying pig. Turned down by Juilliard, Bondurant tells William of his introduction to jazz, and gains William's help breaking into Massey Hall.
| 2 | "Day Kids" | Pavan Moondi | Ira Parker | September 2, 2016 |
Rapidly aging day-kids in footsie pajamas are abandoned in the diner, and the foursome try to fulfill the mayflies' wishes while reflecting on their own lives.
| 3 | "Blow" | Pavan Moondi | Ira Parker | September 9, 2016 |
Bondurant loses his blow before an audition and tells Jaime that he loves Mitzi. Mitzi tells William that their partners are cheating on them, and they consider payback.
| 4 | "Chemistry" | Pavan Moondi | Ira Parker | September 16, 2016 |
Bondurant accuses Mitzi of being conflicted, but invites her for Thanksgiving with his family in Manitoba. Jaime tells of her past lovers who killed themselves trying to satisfy her as a sexual contrarian.
| 5 | "Moon" | Pavan Moondi | Ira Parker | September 23, 2016 |
The nightlife shifts to the University of Toronto observatory, where the science-fiction department prepares to blow up the moon. Bondurant walks away from a performance before the jazz elite to save the source of his sometimes-brilliance. The couples fight: William and Jaime over his repressed emotions, while Mitzi deduces that Bondurant lied about getting into Juilliard.
| 6 | "Folklore" | Pavan Moondi | Ira Parker | September 30, 2016 |
Jaime takes William to a mysterious party, where prominent literati have read his work – which seems to be an examination of Jaime's empty life. Meanwhile, in Manitoba, Bondurant fails to stop his parents from reuniting; they drug Mitzi who admits to sleeping with William.
| 7 | "Four Christs" | Pavan Moondi | Ira Parker | October 8, 2016 |
After the affairs come to light, William considers what Jaime means to him and visits his father for relationship advice. The gang go their separate ways.
| 8 | "The Music" | Pavan Moondi | Ira Parker | October 8, 2016 |
A few weeks later, discouraged by a Juilliard rep, Bondurant breaks into Massey Hall before leaving. Jaime dates Roman Roman who similarly uses her as his muse. William writes a note for Jaime and contemplates suicide. Mitzi has a mistaken carriage [sic].

== Themes ==
The series considers in-between times when anything can happen. Journalist Bill Harris wrote that 4 a.m. marked the behavioural dividing line between "people heading to work rather than staggering home". He noted that the plot is suited to this transitional time, when the characters are both "tired and wired." David Berry of the National Post noted that experiences at this hour are more definitive for being beyond daily routines. Journalist Melita Kuburas wrote that the show is about the moments when the effects of alcohol wear off which "reveal tender, sweet and sad aspects of young adulthood." Actor Maslany felt the characters are escaping the frustrations of their daily lives and seeking the unexpected. He noted that social codes don't seem to apply in a time when most people are asleep.

Creator Ira Parker called it a "genre-bending show", more drama than comedy, with elements of fantasy, science fiction, and twists of the absurd which Parker calls "magical realism". Harris described it as "a televised stage play [...] more artsy than raw." Kuburas noted that the characters are "unreliable narrators" of the story that includes moments of magical realism. Maslany stated that these elements show how "anything feels possible" at that hour.

Jealousy is a major theme, talked about in the first episode and left to build through the season. This is exacerbated by a lie told to Mitzi by the ghost of her pet pig, and shakes-up the group.

== Critical reception ==
John Doyle of The Globe and Mail described the show as "an honest expression of twentysomething angst and confusion" and found it compelling, humorous and touching. He praised the performances of the four lead actors and felt that there was an audience for the offbeat comedy.
