= Molly Maxwell =

2013 Canadian film

- Film poster
- Directed by: Sara St. Onge
- Written by: Sara St. Onge
- Produced by: John Nadalin; Aeschylus Poulos; Mark Van de Ven
- Starring: Lola Tash
- Cinematography: Catherine Lutes
- Edited by: Stephen Philipson
- Production company: Canadian Film Centre
- Distributed by: Entertainment One
- Release date: January 6, 2013 (Palm Springs)
- Running time: 90 minutes
- Country: Canada
- Language: English

Molly Maxwell is a 2013 Canadian drama film directed by Sara St. Onge. It stars Lola Tash as Molly Maxwell, a teenager romantically pursuing her high school English teacher Ben (Charlie Carrick).

The film's cast also includes Krista Bridges, Richard Clarkin and Alex Ozerov.

Sarah Millman received a Canadian Screen Award nomination for Best Costume Design for her work in Molly Maxwell, at the 2nd Canadian Screen Awards in 2014.
