= The Cuban =

2019 Canadian drama film

- Film poster
- Directed by: Sergio Navarretta
- Written by: Alessandra Piccione
- Produced by: Alessandra Piccione; Sergio Navarretta; Taras Koltun; Ana Golja
- Starring: Louis Gossett Jr.; Ana Golja; Lauren Holly; Giacomo Gianniotti; Shohreh Aghdashloo
- Cinematography: Celiana Cárdenas
- Edited by: Jane MacRae
- Music by: Hilario Durán
- Production company: S.N.A.P. Films Inc.
- Distributed by: A71 Entertainment Brainstorm Media
- Release date: December 7, 2019 (Whistler)
- Running time: 109 minutes
- Country: Canada
- Language: English

The Cuban is a 2019 Canadian drama film, directed by Sergio Navarretta and written by Alessandra Piccione. The film stars Ana Golja as Mina, a young woman working at a nursing home managed by her aunt Bano (Shohreh Aghdashloo) while preparing for medical school, whose outlook on life is profoundly changed when she meets and befriends Luis Garcia (Louis Gossett Jr.), a former Cuban jazz musician who has been living in the home since being diagnosed with dementia.

== Plot ==
An unexpected friendship begins between an elderly Cuban musician with dementia who is brought out of his shell by his care worker, and a disillusioned young pre-med Afghan student named Mina. Through a shared loved of music, both their lives are changed.

== Cast ==
- Louis Gossett Jr. as Luis Garcia
- Ana Golja as Mina Ayoub
- Lauren Holly as Nurse Baker
- Shiva Negar as Zahra Karzai
- Jonathan Keltz as Ethan
- Layla Alzida as Shireen Karzai
- Kane Mahon as Atesh Karzai
- Taborah Johnson as Clarita
- Giacomo Gianniotti as Kris
- Shohreh Aghdashloo as Bano Ayoub
- Tanner Zipchen as Orderly

In addition, Gabriel Sanchez Hernandez is seen throughout the film when Luis' addled memories conjure up the young Elena.

== Release ==
The film premiered on December 7, 2019, at the Whistler Film Festival, where Celiana Cárdenas won the Borsos Competition award for Best Cinematography in a Canadian Film. It had its American premiere in February 2020 at the Los Angeles Pan African Film Festival, winning the Audience Award for Narrative Feature and the Special Programmer's Award.

In April 2020, the film aired on Super Channel as part of its special program of airing the films that had been slated to run at the Canadian Film Festival prior to its cancellation in light of the COVID-19 pandemic.

The film was released at drive-ins and traditional theatres across Canada on July 28, 2020, and in virtual cinemas across the United States on July 31, 2020.

== Awards and nominations ==
Award	Date of ceremony	Category	Nominees	Result	Reference
Canadian Screen Awards	May 20, 2021	Best Editing	Jane MacRae	Nominated	
Canadian Screen Awards	May 20, 2021	Best Original Song	Hilario Durán, "El Milagro"	Nominated	
Canadian Screen Awards	May 20, 2021	Best Original Song	Hilario Durán, "Mambo in Dominante"	Nominated	
