= Celiana Cárdenas =

Mexican-Canadian cinematographer

Celiana Cárdenas is a Mexican-Canadian cinematographer. She is most noted for her work on the film The Cuban, for which she won the Borsos Competition award for Best Cinematography in a Canadian Film at the 2019 Whistler Film Festival, and the television series Diggstown, for which she received a Canadian Screen Award nomination for Best Photography in a Drama Program or Series at the 9th Canadian Screen Awards in 2021.

Her other credits have included the films Picture Day, Portrait of a Serial Monogamist and Riot Girls.
