= Jane MacRae =

Canadian film and television editor

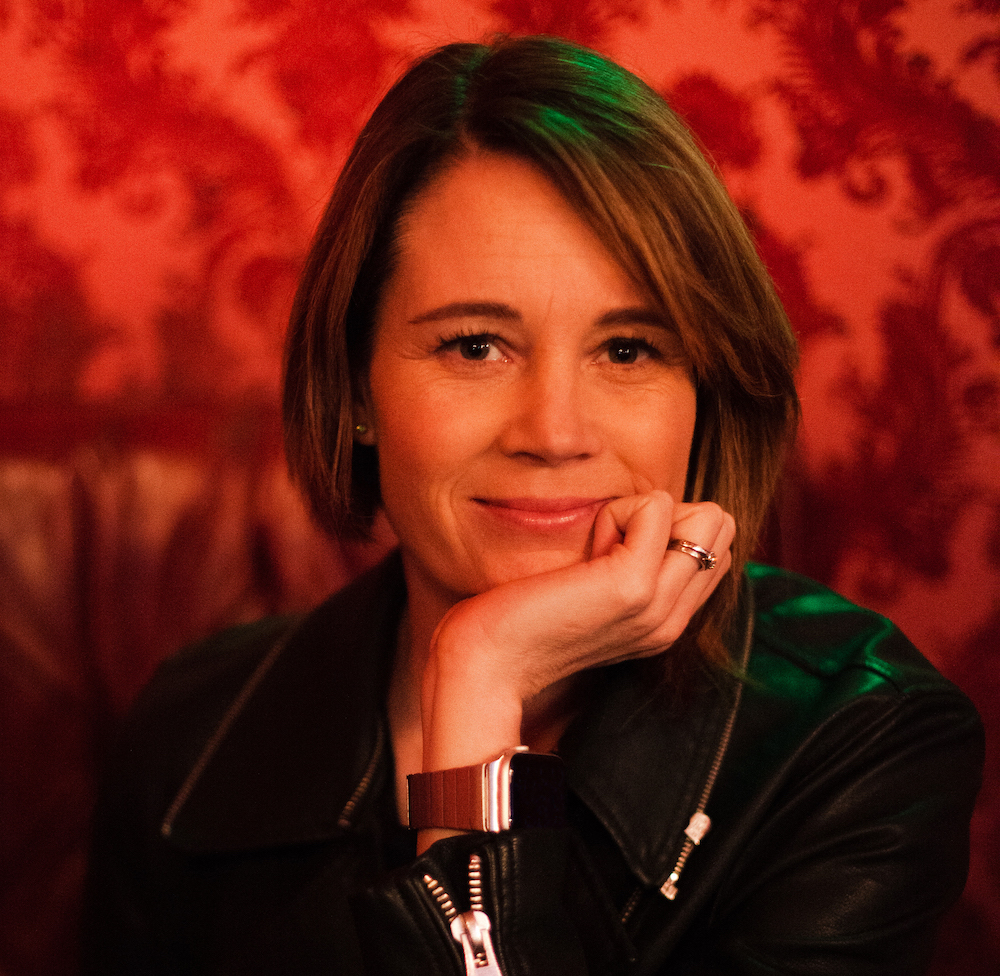
Jane MacRae

Jane MacRae is a Canadian film and television editor. She is most noted for her work on the 2019 film The Cuban, for which she received a Canadian Screen Award nomination for Best Editing at the 9th Canadian Screen Awards in 2021.

Her other credits have included the films Blood Hunters, 22 Chaser and The Dancing Dogs of Dombrova, and the television series Endlings, Odd Squad, Dino Dana and Lockdown.
