= Looking for Angelina =

- Directed by: Sergio Navarretta
- Release date: 2005
- Country: Canada
- Languages: English, Italian

Looking for Angelina is a 2005 Canadian drama film based on the murder case involving Angelina Napolitano. Napolitano allegedly murdered her husband with an axe and was sentenced to be executed.

In 2003, independent film director Sergio Navarretta began researching Angelina's life for a documentary, but expanded the project into a feature film "once we realized how dramatic the facts were." The film, Looking for Angelina, was shot in two weeks in 2004 in Sault Ste. Marie, on a shoestring budget of $250,000. The writers, Alessandra Piccione and Frank Canino, took inspiration from Canino's play "The Angelina Project". Lina Giornofelice starred as Angelina, with Alvaro D’Antonio playing Pietro. For authenticity, large parts of the film are in period-correct Italian with English subtitles.

The film was released on February 11, 2005, directed by Sergio Navarretta. The film was released in both English and Italian. The film was also released in Argentina on February 19, 2009 under the title Buscando a Angelina. It was shown at the Montreal World Film Festival, Cinéfest in Sudbury, Quitus Italian Film Festival in Montreal, Shadows of the Mind Festival in Sault Ste Marie, the International Film Festival of India, Cimameriche Film Festival in Genoa and the Mumbai International Film Festival. "In general," said director Navaretta, "audiences have responded to the film on an emotional level, empathizing with the journey of [the characters]." "Looking For Angelina" won three awards: A Special Recognition at the Cimameriche Film Festival and Best Feature (Drama) and Quitus Award of Distinction at the Quitus Film Festival in Montreal.
