= The Colossal Failure of the Modern Relationship =

- Directed by: Sergio Navarretta
- Written by: Alessandra Piccione
- Starring: Krista Bridges; Enrico Colantoni; David Cubitt; Brooke Palsson
- Release date: 2015 (Niagara Integrated Film Festival)
- Running time: 102 minutes
- Country: Canada
- Languages: English; French; Italian; Hebrew

The Colossal Failure of the Modern Relationship is a 2015 Canadian comedy drama film written by Alessandra Piccione, directed by Sergio Navarretta and starring Krista Bridges, Enrico Colantoni, David Cubitt and Brooke Palsson.

== Cast ==
- Krista Bridges as Catrine
- Enrico Colantoni as Freddy
- David Cubitt as Richard
- Brooke Palsson as Amy

== Release ==
The film was shown at the Niagara Integrated Film Festival in 2015. Then it was released in theaters in Canada on June 23, 2017.

== Reception ==
Norman Wilner of Now gave the film a negative review, calling it “a pretty generic romantic comedy with some appealing actors, set in the incredibly picturesque Niagara wine country.”

Chris Knight of the National Post also gave the film a negative review and wrote, “The mostly Canadian cast are good actors all, but nothing they’re forced to say in Alessandra Piccione’s screenplay rings true…”
