= Coconut Hero =

2015 film

- Directed by: Florian Cossen
- Written by: Elena von Saucken
- Produced by: Jochen Laube; Fabian Maubach; Paul Scherzer
- Starring: Alex Ozerov; Bea Santos
- Cinematography: Brendan Steacy
- Music by: Matthias Klein
- Release date: 28 June 2015 (MIFF)
- Running time: 97 minutes
- Countries: Germany; Canada
- Languages: English; German

Coconut Hero is a German-Canadian comedy film directed by Florian Cossen and released in 2015. Coconut Hero premiered on March 18, 2015 at the Carlton Cinema in Toronto where it screened for two consecutive weeks. Following its premiere, on March 25, Coconut Hero was shown for one week in Ottawa's ByTowne Cinema.

== Plot ==
Mike Tyson (not to be confused with Mike Tyson) is a 16-year-old student living in the Canadian town of Faintville. Tyson attempts suicide, though after surviving he soon finds out that he has a deadly tumor. Initially, the tumor appears as a godsend in Tyson's mind as he becomes increasingly preoccupied with the desire and development of a mission to find a way to end his life. This mission is reinforced by his religious figure's encouragement for Tyson to find a plan for himself and follow through with it.

After finding out about his tumor, Tyson meets Miranda and his priorities in life change from his morbid preoccupation, to spending time with and learning about his new love interest. Soon after, Tyson also meets his father; a figure that had been absent in his life until this point in time. Cynthia, his mother, objects to his father's sudden return, but becomes closer to him after learning that Tyson has planned against getting surgery to remove his tumor: the only means of saving his life.

Tyson becomes overwhelmed with the conflict between choosing to fulfill his wishes of ending his life versus his thoughts and feelings surrounding his new relationship with Miranda. These feelings lead Tyson into making a spontaneous decision to run away with Miranda on a road-trip. After witnessing Miranda being struck by a car and suffering an unfortunate death whilst still on their trip together, Tyson decides to get the surgery that will remove his tumor. Ultimately, Tyson chooses life.

== Cast ==
- Alex Ozerov as Mike Tyson
- Bea Santos as Miranda
- Krista Bridges as Cynthia Tyson
- Sebastian Schipper as Frank Burger
- Jim Annan as Pastor
- Udo Kier as Mr. Morrow
- R. D. Reid as Funeral Director
- Jeff Clarke as Doctor

== Production ==
The director, Florian Cossen, is a German-Canadian and pays homage to a large portion of his youth spent in a small Canadian city by filming Coconut Hero within Canada in a similarly small town. Coconut Hero was filmed in 2014 in Sault Ste. Marie, Ontario, a town in northern Ontario. The filming of Coconut Hero also took the cast to Germany for two days, after spending six weeks in Sault Ste. Marie.

The film is a German-Canadian co-production from Toronto's Six Island Productions and Germany-based UFA Fiction. Search Engine Films out of Toronto distributed the movie out of Canada.

== Reception ==
Barry Hertz of The Globe and Mail praises Florian Cossen's ability to cast an impressive number of European actors for a small film, but describes the film's plot by saying "there's nothing new here that hasn't been mined, ahem, to death in other, similar genre entries".

Harald Mühlbeyer, a German critic from the 2015 Munich Film Festival, explains that the title is confusing and generally unrelated to the content of the film itself, but is quoted as saying that overall, Coconut Hero is a good film: "[The title] is the only mistake in this outstanding one masterpiece", as translated from German.

== Award nominations ==
In 2015, Coconut Hero was nominated for the Golden Eye Award at the Zurich Film Festival. The film was later nominated in the New Directors Competition Category in 2016 at the Seattle International Film Festival.
