= Sasha K. Gordon =

Ukrainian actress

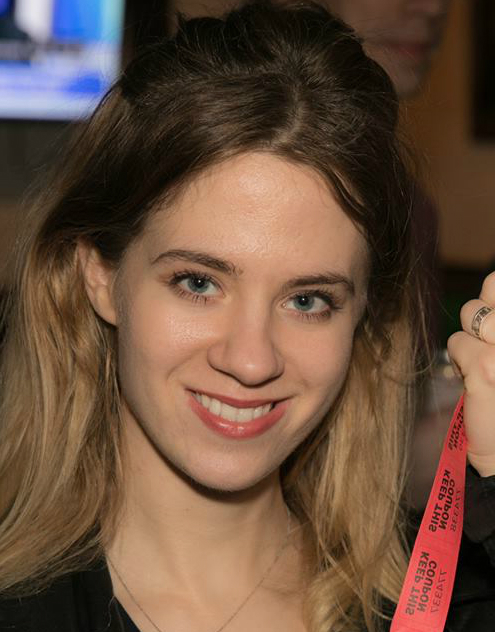
- At Peter McManus Cafe in 2017
- Born: Oksana Tischenko; 11 October 1989 (age 35); Odesa, Ukrainian SSR, Soviet Union (now Ukraine)
- Occupation: Actress
- Years active: 2015–present

Sasha K. Gordon (born Oksana Tischenko, (Note: Ukrainian: Оксана Тищенко, romanized: Oksana Tyshchenko) October 11, 1989) is an actress residing in New York City, New York. She is most noted for her performance in the 2015 film Natasha, for which she garnered a Canadian Screen Award nomination for Best Actress at the 5th Canadian Screen Awards in March 2017.

== Early life ==
Born and raised in Odesa, Ukrainian SSR, Soviet Union (now Ukraine), She moved to the United States at age 16.

== Education ==
Gordon studied marketing and finance at Fordham University, and acting at the Bruce Ornstein Acting Workshop.

== Career ==
Gordon is also a stage actress with the Wednesday Repertory Company in New York City, and performed in the off-Broadway play Terezin.

Sasha's favorite actors are Andrei Mironov, Philip Seymour Hoffman, Meryl Streep, Robert De Niro, and Ben Kingsley.
