= Jerusalem Jewish Film Festival =

Jewish Film Festival

The Jerusalem Jewish Film Festival (JJFF) is an annual film festival held in Jerusalem, dedicated to world cinema that focuses on Jewish life, experience, history and culture worldwide. It is hosted by the Jerusalem cinematheque and 2021 marked its 23rd year.

Past notable guests include Jewish French philosopher Bernard-Henri Lévy.
