= Krista Bridges =

Canadian actress (born 1968)

- Born: 4 November 1968 (age 57); Ontario, Canada
- Occupation: Actress
- Years active: 1988–present

Krista Bridges (born 4 November 1968) is a Canadian actress. She has appeared in more than 110 film and television productions since 1988, and received a Genie Award nomination for Best Supporting Actress at the 13th Genie Awards in 1992 for The Shower.

== Selected filmography ==
=== Film ===
Film
Year	Title	Role	Notes
1988	Murder One	Hostess	Credited as Krista Pontes
1989	Sing	Pretty Girl	
1992	The Shower	Kate	
1994	Soft Deceit	Ed's Girlfriend	
1996	Kids in the Hall: Brain Candy	Groupie	
1998	Altarpiece	Woman	Short film
1999	Blind	The Woman	Short film
2000	Left Behind: The Movie	Ivy Gold	
2002	Santa Monica	Miss Mederos	
2002	Narc	Audrey Tellis	
2002	Left Behind II: Tribulation Force	Ivy Gold	
2004	Tongue Tied	Emma	Short film
2005	Aurora Borealis	Cara	
2005	Niagara Motel	Sandy	
2005	Land of the Dead	Motown	
2005	Lake	Woman	Short film
2007	Late Fragment	Faye	
2009	The Cry of the Owl	Elaine	
2009	Man v. Minivan	Penny	Short film
2011	388 Arletta Avenue	Katherine	
2011	Faces in the Crowd	Francine #4	
2012	Your Side of the Bed	Genie	
2013	Molly Maxwell	Marilyn Maxwell	
2014	Warning Signs	Elaine	Short film
2014	The Christmas Switch	Barbara Morgan	
2015	When the Sky Falls	Megan	Original title Deadly Voltage
2015	Coconut Hero	Cynthia Tyson	
2015	The Colossal Failure of the Modern Relationship	Cat Lytton	
2018	Knuckleball	Sheriff Connie Munroe	
2018	Isabelle	Jessica	
2019	Astronaut	Molly	
2019	Goliath	Ellie	
2021	The Boathouse	Laura Peterson	
2022	I Like Movies	Terri Kweller	
2023	Dream Scenario	Carlotta	
2023	Suze	Deb	
2025	A Breed Apart	Clara Pender	

=== Television ===
Television
Year	Title	Role	Notes
1988	War of the Worlds	Teen Queen	Season 1, episode 9: "To Heal the Leper"
1989	My Secret Identity	Beth / Susannah	2 episodes
1989–1990	The Hitchhiker	Penny / Killer Hooker	2 episodes
1990	T. and T.	Sissy	Season 3, episode 3: "Halfway to Nowhere"
1990	Top Cops	Diane James	Season 1, episode 16: "Connie Higgins/Dick Tracy"
1990	The Kids in the Hall	Over-Eager Girlfriend	Episode #2.9
1991	The Hidden Room	Caroline	Season 1, episode 8: "Taking Back the Night"
1991	Beyond Reality	Angie	Season 1, episode 10: "Black Magic"
1994	Catwalk	Zoe	Season 2, episode 2: "Killing Time"
1994	RoboCop	WOMB Woman	Episode 17: "Sisters in Crime"
1994	Harlequin: Treacherous Beauties	Tiffany	TV movie
1994	Side Effects	Sherry	Season 1, episode 1: "Immortality Business"
1994–1995	Forever Knight	Ellen / Sharon	2 episodes
1994–1996	Kung Fu: The Legend Continues	Lorraine Larsen / Sally	2 episodes
1995	Bloodknot	Julie / Tom's girlfriend	TV movie
1995	The Hardy Boys	Sophie	Episode 4: "Say Cheese"
1997	Melanie Darrow	Claire	TV movie
1997	Once a Thief	Sherri	Episode 5: "Mac Daddy"
1998–2000	Power Play	Rose Thornton	
2001	Doc	Joyce / Joyce Slayton	2 episodes
2001	Leap Years	Deborah	Episode 9
2001–2004	Blue Murder	Adrienne Carlyle / Sarah Vasek	2 episodes
2004–2006	Naked Josh	Hunter Randall	3 episodes
2006	Cheaters' Club	Meredith Glass	TV movie
2007	The Dresden Files	Special Agent Kelly Raskin	Episode 3: "Hair of the Dog"
2007	She Drives Me Crazy	Virginia Valenti	TV movie
2008	Dr. Jekyll and Mr. Hyde	Claire Wheaton	TV movie
2008	The Summit	Dr. Zuzanna Vrobova	Miniseries; Episode: "Night Two"
2009	Murdoch Mysteries	Madame Ettie Weston	Season 2, episode 5: "The Green Muse"
2009	Flashpoint	Patty Cooper	Season 2, episode 17: "The Good Citizen"
2010	Who Is Clark Rockefeller?	Agent Susan Pascale	TV movie
2010	Durham County	Sabina Leung	6 episodes
2011	Wandering Eye	Jacqueline Fitzpatrick	TV movie
2011	The Case for Christmas	Dina Smiger	TV movie
2012	The Wife He Met Online	Zenya Ivanski	TV movie
2012	Rookie Blue	Dana Moyer	Season 3, episode 5: "Messy Houses"
2012	The Listener	Kelly	Season 3, episode 10: "Lockdown"
2012	XIII: The Series	Alice	Season 2, episode 3: "Defender"
2012–2014	Republic of Doyle	Kathleen Doyle	19 episodes
2013	Nikita	Angela	Season 3, episode 9: "Survival Instincts"
2013	Dangerous Persuasions	Susan Hamlin	Episode 4: "American Nightmare"
2013	Hannibal	Jocelyn Madchen	Season 1, episode 10: "Buffet Froid"
2013	Haven	Carmen Brock	Season 4, episode 4: "Lost and Found"
2013	The Rick Mercer Report	Trick'r'Treat Mother	Episode: #11.4
2015–2016	Heroes Reborn	Anne Clark	10 episodes
2016	Eyewitness	FBI Director	Episode 7: "They Lied"
2016	Incorporated	Diana	Episode 3: "Human Resources"
2016–2017	19-2	Inspector Elise Roberge	11 episodes
2017	Ransom	Mary Hofsteter / Mary Hofstedter	2 episodes; one uncredited
2017	Sometimes the Good Kill	Sister Nora	TV movie
2017	Killjoys	Captain	Season 3, episode 1: "Boondoggie"
2017	Played		Episode 1: "Played"
2017	Suits	Janet Stanger	2 episodes
2018	Schitt's Creek	Mom Guest	Season 4, episode 1: "Dead Guy in Room 4"
2018	Her Stolen Past	Rebecca	TV movie
2018–2022	The Expanse	Admiral Kirino / Capt. Sandrine Kirino	TV series
2019	Homekilling Queen	Sarah Hart	TV movie
2020	A Killer in My Home	Jenna Fallon	
2020	Nurses	Astrid	Season 1, episode 10: "Lady Business"
2020	Ghostwriter	Michelle Palmer	2 episodes
2021	Ginny & Georgia	Mrs. Chen	Episode 5: "Boo, Bitch"
2021	Titans	Dr. Leslie Thompkins	Season 3, episode 5: "Lazarus"
2021	Webcam Cheerleaders	Nancy	TV movie
2021	The Lost Symbol	Townsend	Episode 9: "Order Eight"
2022	Coroner	Malou Dan	Season 4, episode 6: "Young Legend"
2022	Transplant	Shelley	2 episodes
2022	Workin' Moms	Louise Maddox	4 episodes
2022	The Umbrella Academy	Sarah-Beth	Season 3, episode 2: "World's Biggest Ball of Twine"
2022	The Good Doctor	Moira Stinson	Season 6, episode 3: "A Big Sign"
2024–2025	Heartland	Gracie Pryce	Season 18 episode 10: "Open House" Season 19, episodes 1-3, 5 & 6, 9 & 10
