= Alex Ozerov-Meyer =

Canadian actor (b. 1992)

- Born: Alex Ozerov; August 3, 1992 (age 34); Tula, Russia
- Occupation: Actor
- Spouse: Sydney Meyer (m. 2021)

Alex Ozerov-Meyer (née Ozerov; born 1992) is a Russian and Canadian actor. He is most noted for his performance in the short film Pyotr495, for which he won the Canadian Screen Award for Best Lead Performance in a Digital Program or Series at the 7th Canadian Screen Awards.

== Early life ==
Ozerov is originally from Tula, Russia. As a young child he lived in Garbolovo, a military townlet outside Saint Petersburg as his father was a paratrooper in the army. His parents separated when he was six years old and he lived between his mother in England and his father in Ukraine. He moved to Kitchener, Ontario, when he was thirteen after his mother met a man living in Canada. They later settled in Toronto.

== Career ==
He had a couple of small roles in television before being cast in his first major role, as Trevor in the 2012 film Blackbird. He has since appeared in the films Guidance, What We Have, Coconut Hero, and Natasha, and the television series Bitten, Freakish, The Americans, Orphan Black, Cardinal, and Another Life.

== Personal life ==
In 2021 he married Sydney Meyer, his co-star in the series Slasher: Flesh and Blood, and has since been credited as Alex Ozerov-Meyer.

== Filmography ==
Year	Title	Role	Notes
2011	Salem Falls	Thomas McAfee	Television film
2012	What's Up Warthogs!	Magician	Episode: "Inauguration Complication"
2012	Blackbird	Trevor	
2012	The Transporter	Punk	2 episodes
2013	Molly Maxwell	Starr	
2013	Perfect Storm: Disasters That Changed The World	Sergey Zahlystov	Episode: "Hitler's Frozen Army"
2013	Rookie Blue	Digby	Episode: "Skeletons"
2013	Cracked	Derek Tilson	Episode: "Skeletons"
2014	Guidance	Brent 'Ghost' Wark	
2014	What We Have	Allan	
2014–2017	Orphan Black	Ramone	4 episodes
2015	Coconut Hero	Mike Tyson	
2015	The Dark Stranger	Toby Garrison	
2015	A Christmas Horror Story	Mike Tyson	
2015	Natasha	Mark Berman	
2016	Bitten	Alexei Antonov	Recurring role; 9 episodes
2016	The History of Love	Misha Strumann	
2016	Freakish	Lyle	Recurring role; 3 episodes
2016–2017	The Americans	Mischa Semenov	Recurring role; 7 episodes
2017	Boys on Film 16: Possession	Pyotr	
2017	Blindspot	Vanya Petrushev	Episode: "This Profound Legacy"
2017	The Machine	Maxim	Television film
2019	Cardinal	Jack	Recurring role; 6 episodes
2019	Frankenstein's Monster's Monster, Frankenstein	Joey Vallejo	Television film
2019–2021	Another Life	Oliver Sokolov	Main role (season 1); Guest role (season 2)
2021	Slasher	Theo Galloway	Main role (season 4)
2022	Hudson & Rex	Otto Hart	Episodes: "Blood & Diamonds"
2022	Transplant	Otto Hart	Episodes: "Audition"
2023	The Spencer Sisters	Vasily	Episodes: "The Runaway's Regret"
2024	Brilliant Minds	John Doe	Recurring role
2026	The Voices of Our Mother	Martin	
2026	The Betrayers	Avi Glickman	
2026	Mayday	Viktor	
2026	Lucky Weekend		
