= List of Vancouver International Film Festival award winners =

The following is a list of Vancouver International Film Festival award winners.

== Award winners by year ==
=== 2002 ===
- Most Popular International Film: Bowling for Columbine by Michael Moore
- Most Popular Canadian Film: Expecting by Deborah Day and FIX: The Story of an Addicted City by Nettie Wild
- National Film Board Award for Best Documentary: Gambling, Gods and LSD by Peter Mettler

=== 2003 ===
- Most Popular International Film: Kamchatka by Marcelo Piñeyro
- Most Popular Canadian Film: The Corporation by Mark Achbar and Jennifer Abbott
- National Film Board Award for Best Documentary: Los Angeles Plays Itself by Thom Andersen

=== 2004 ===
- Most Popular International Film: Machuca by Andrés Wood
- Most Popular Canadian Film: What Remains of Us by François Prévost and Hugo Latulippe and Being Caribou by Leanne Allison and Diana Wilson
- National Film Board Award for Best Documentary: In the Realms of the Unreal by Jessica Yu
- Best Young Canadian Director of a Short Film: Jennifer Calvert for Riverburn

=== 2005 ===
- Most Popular International Film: Go, See, and Become by Radu Mihăileanu
- Most Popular Canadian Film: Eve and the Fire Horse by Julia Kwan
- National Film Board Award for Best Documentary: A Particular Silence by Stefano Rulli

=== 2006 ===
- Most Popular International Film: The Lives of Others by Florian Henckel von Donnersmarck
- Most Popular Canadian Film: Mystic Ball by Greg Hamilton
- National Film Board Award for Best Documentary: Have You Heard From Johannesburg? by Connie Field
- Special Jury Prize: Radiant City by Gary Burns and Jim Brown

=== 2007 ===
- Vancity People's Choice Award for Most Popular Canadian Film: She's a Boy I Knew directed by Gwen Haworth
- Rogers People's Choice Award for Most Popular International Film: Persepolis directed by Marjane Satrapi and Vincent Paronnaud
- People's Choice Award for Most Popular International Nonfiction Film: Garbage Warrior directed by Oliver Hodge
- Kyoto Planet "Climate for Change" Award: The Planet directed by Johan Söderberg, Michael Stenberg, and Linus Torell
- Dragons & Tigers Award for Young Cinema: shared by Fujian Blue directed by Weng Shouming (Robin Weng) and Mid-Afternoon Barks directed by Zhang Yuedong
- Citytv Western Canadian Feature Film Award: Normal directed by Carl Bessai
- National Film Board of Canada Best Canadian Documentary Feature Award: Up the Yangtze directed by Yung Chang
- Women In Film and Television Vancouver Artistic Merit Award: She's a Boy I Knew directed by Gwen Haworth
- Most Promising Director of a Canadian Short Film: The Windfisherman directed by Anna McRoberts

=== 2008 ===
- Citytv Western Canada Feature Film Award: Fifty Dead Men Walking directed by Kari Skogland
- VIFF Nonfiction Feature Award: Born Without directed by Eva Norvind
- Most Promising Director of a Canadian Short Film: The Valet directed by Drew McCreadie
- Women in Film & Television Vancouver Artistic Merit Award: Mothers & Daughters awarded to Tantoo Cardinal
- International Film Guide Inspiration Award: Control Alt Delete directed by Cameron Labine
- Rogers People's Choice Award: I've Loved You So Long (Il y a longtemps que je t'aime) directed by Philippe Claudel
- documentary Audience Award: Throw Down Your Heart directed by Sascha Paladino
- VIFF Most Popular Canadian Film Award: Mothers & Daughters directed by Carl Bessai
- National Film Board's Most Popular Canadian Documentary Award: Fierce Light: When Spirit Meets Action directed by Velcrow Ripper
- VIFF Environmental Film Audience Award: Blue Gold: World Water Wars directed by Sam Bozzo
- Dragons & Tigers Award for Young Cinema: Perfect Life directed by Emily Tang

=== 2009 ===
- Canwest Award for Best Canadian Feature Film I Killed My Mother (J'ai tué ma mère) directed by Xavier Dolan
- Most Promising Director of a Canadian Short Film: The Last Act directed by Jan Binsse and David Tougas
- Women in Film & Television Vancouver Artistic Merit Award: 65 Redroses directed and produced by Nimisha Mukerji and Gillian Lowry
- Rogers People's Choice Award: Soundtrack for a Revolution directed by Bill Guttentag and Dan Sturman
- documentary Audience Award for Most Popular Nonfiction Film: Facing Ali directed by Pete McCormack
- VIFF Most Popular Canadian Film Award: 65 Redroses by Nimisha Mukerji & Philip Lyall
- National Film Board's Most Popular Canadian Documentary Award: 65 Redroses by Nimisha Mukerji & Philip Lyall
- VIFF Environmental Film Audience Award: At the Edge of the World directed by Dan Stone
- Dragons & Tigers Award for Young Cinema: Eighteen directed by Jang Kun-jae

=== 2010 ===
- ET Canada Award for Best Canadian Feature Film Incendies directed by Denis Villeneuve
- Most Promising Director of a Canadian Short Film Mokhtar, directed by Halima Ouardiri
- Rogers People's Choice Award Waste Land (UK, Brazil), directed by Lucy Walker
- VIFF Most Popular Nonfiction Film Award, Kinshasa Symphony (Germany), directed by Claus Wischmann and Martin Baer
- VIFF Most Popular Canadian Film Award, Two Indians Talking, directed by Sara McIntyre
- NFB Most Popular Canadian Documentary Award, Leave Them Laughing, directed by John Zaritsky
- VIFF Environmental Film Audience Award, Force of Nature: The David Suzuki Movie (Canada), directed by Sturla Gunnarsson
- Dragons & Tigers Award for Young Cinema, Good Morning To The World (Japan), directed by Hirohara Satoru

=== 2011 ===
- Shaw Media Award for Best Canadian Feature Film ($20,000 prize) – Nuit #1, Anne Émond (Canada)
- Dragons & Tigers Award for Young Cinema, presented by Brad Birarda & Robert Sali ($10,000 prize) – The Sun Beaten Path, Sonthar Gyal (China)
- Most Promising Director of a Canadian Short Film Award ($2,000 prize) – We Ate the Children Last, Andrew Cividino (Canada)
- Rogers People's Choice Award – A Separation, Asghar Farhadi (Iran)
- VIFF Most Popular Nonfiction Film Award – Sing Your Song, Susanne Rostock (USA)
- VIFF Most Popular Canadian Film Award – Starbuck, Ken Scott (Canada)
- NFB Most Popular Canadian Documentary Award – Peace Out, Charles Wilkinson (Canada)
- VIFF Environmental Film Audience Award – People of a Feather, Joel Heath (Canada)

=== 2012 ===
- Award for Best Canadian Feature Film ($10,000 prize) – Blackbird, Jason Buxton (Canada)
- Dragons & Tigers Award for Young Cinema, presented by Brad Birarda ($5,000 prize) – Emperor Visits The Hell (Tang Huang You Difu), Li Luo (China)
- Most Promising Director of a Canadian Short Film Award ($2,000 prize) – Float, Juan Riedinger (Canada)
- Rogers People's Choice Award – The Hunt, Thomas Vinterberg (Denmark)
- VIFF Most Popular Canadian Film Award – Becoming Redwood, Jesse James Miller (Canada)
- NFB Most Popular Canadian Documentary Award – Blood Relative, Nimisha Mukerji (Canada)
- VIFF Most Popular International Documentary Film Award – Nuala, Patrick Farrelly and Kate O'Callaghan (Ireland)
- VIFF Environmental Film Audience Award – Revolution, Rob Stewart (Canada)
- VIFF Most Popular International First Feature Award – I, Anna, Barnaby Southcombe (UK)
- Women in Film & Television Vancouver Artistic Merit Award: Liverpool directed and written by Manon Briand

=== 2013 ===
- Award for Best Canadian Feature Film ($5,000 prize each) – Rhymes for Young Ghouls, Jeff Barnaby (Canada) and That Burning Feeling, Jason James (Canada)
- Dragons & Tigers Award for Young Cinema, presented by Brad Birarda ($5,000 prize) – Anatomy of a Paperclip, Ikeda Akira (Japan)
- Most Promising Director of a Canadian Short Film Award ($2,000 prize) – Nathan, Mathieu Arsenault (Canada)
- Rogers People's Choice Award – Like Father, Like Son, Koreeda Hirokazu (Japan)
- VIFF Most Popular Canadian Film Award – Down River, Benjamin Ratner (Canada)
- VIFF Most Popular Canadian Documentary Award – When I Walk, Jason DaSilva (Canada)
- VIFF Most Popular International Documentary Film Award – Desert Runners, Jennifer Steinman (USA)
- VIFF Most Popular Canadian Environmental Documentary Award – Salmon Confidential, Twyla Roscovich (Canada)
- VIFF Most Popular International First Feature Award – Wadjda, Haifaa al-Mansour (Germany, Saudi Arabia)
- Women in Film & Television Vancouver Artistic Merit Award: Sarah Prefers to Run directed and written by Chloé Robichaud

=== 2014 ===
- Award for Best Canadian Film ($8,000 prize) – Violent, Andrew Huculiak (Canada)
- Most Promising Director of a Canadian Short Film Award – The Cut, Geneviève Dulude-De Celles (Canada)
- Rogers People's Choice Award – The Vancouver Asahi, Ishii Yuya (Japan)
- VIFF Most Popular Canadian Film Award – Preggoland, Jacob Tierney (Canada)
- VIFF Most Popular Canadian Documentary Award – All the Time in the World, Suzanne Crocker (Canada)
- VIFF Most Popular International Documentary Film Award – Glen Campbell: I'll Be Me, James Keach (USA)
- VIFF BC Emerging Filmmaker Award – Sitting on the Edge of Marlene, Ana Valine (Canada)
- VIFF Best BC Film Award – Violent, Andrew Huculiak (Canada)
- VIFF Impact Award – Just Eat It: A Food Waste Story, Grant Baldwin (Canada)
- VIFF Best New Director (international) – Miss and the Doctors, Axelle Ropert (France) and Rekorder, Mikhail Red (Philippines)
- Women in Film & Television Vancouver Artistic Merit Award – Sitting on the Edge of Marlene, Ana Valine

=== 2015 ===
The 34th annual Vancouver International Film Festival was held from September 24 to October 9, 2015. The VIFF Industry Conference – the premier media conference in Western Canada – runs from September 30 to October 3, 2015.

Audience Awards

- Rogers People's Choice Award – Brooklyn, John Crowley (UK, Ireland, Canada)
- VIFF Most Popular International Documentary – Ingrid Bergman: In Her Own Words (Jag är Ingrid), Stig Björkman (Sweden)
- VIFF Most Popular Canadian Feature – Room, Lenny Abrahamson (Ireland, Canada)
- VIFF Most Popular Canadian Documentary – Haida Gwaii: On the Edge of the World, Charles Wilkinson (Canada)
- VIFF Impact: International Audience Award – Landfill Harmonic, Brad Allgood and Graham Townsley (USA, Paraguay)
- VIFF Impact: Canadian Audience Award – Fractured Land, Damien Gillis and Fiona Rayher (Canada)
- Women in Film+Television Artistic Merit Award – Ninth Floor, Mina Shum (Canada)

Juried Awards

- Best Canadian Film: Sleeping Giant, Andrew Cividino
- Best British Columbia Film: Fractured Land, Damien Gillis and Fiona Rayher
- British Columbia Emerging Filmmaker: The Devout, Connor Gaston
- Emerging Canadian Director: The Sound of Trees (Le Bruit des arbres), François Péloquin
- Best Canadian Short Film: Blue-Eyed Blonde, Pascal Plante
- Most Promising Director of a Canadian Short Film: Never Steady, Never Still, Kathleen Hepburn

=== 2016 ===
The 35th annual Vancouver International Film Festival was held from September 29 to October 14, 2016.

- Ignite Award – Cabbie, Jessica Parsons and Jennifer Chiu (Canada)
- Best BC Short Film Award – Here Nor There, Julia Hutchings (Canada)
- Best BC Film Award – Window Horses (The Poetic Persian Epiphany of Rosie Ming), Ann Marie Fleming (Canada)
- BC Emerging Filmmaker Award – Hello Destroyer, Kevan Funk (Canada)
- Best Canadian Film – Window Horses (The Poetic Persian Epiphany of Rosie Ming), Ann Marie Fleming (Canada)
- Best Canadian Short Film – Those Who Remain (Ceux qui restent), Mathieu Vachon (Canada)
- Most Promising Director of a Canadian Short Film – Parent, Teacher, Roman Tchjen (Canada)
- Emerging Canadian Director – Never Eat Alone, Sofia Bohdanowicz (Canada)
- Best Canadian Documentary – Living With Giants (Chez les géants), Sebastien Rist and Aude Leroux-Lévesque (Canada)
- VIFF IMPACT Award – Power to Change: The Energy Rebellion (Power to Change – Die Energie Rebellion), Carl-A. Fechner (Germany)
- VIFF Super Channel People's Choice Award – Maudie, Aisling Walsh (Canada, Ireland)
- Most Popular International Feature – I, Daniel Blake, Ken Loach (United Kingdom, France, Belgium)
- Most Popular International Documentary – Human, Yann Arthus-Bertrand (France)
- Most Popular Canadian Documentary – Spirit Unforgettable, Pete McCormack (Canada)

=== 2017 ===
The 36th annual Vancouver International Film Festival was held from September 28 to October 13, 2017

BC Spotlight Awards

- Sea to Sky Award – Never Steady, Never Still, Kathleen Hepburn
- Best BC Film Award – Luk'Luk'I, Wayne Wapeemukwa
- BC Emerging Filmmaker Award – Kathleen Hepburn (Never Steady, Never Still)

Canadian Awards

- Best Canadian Film – Black Cop, Cory Bowles
- Emerging Canadian Director – Kathleen Hepburn (Never Steady, Never Still)
- Best Canadian Documentary – Unarmed Verses, Charles Officer
- Best BC Short Film – Rupture, Yassmina Karajah
- Best Canadian Short Film – Shadow Nettes, Phillip Barker
- Most Promising Director of a Canadian Short Film – Vincent Toi (The Crying Conch)

Impact Awards

- VIFF Impact Award – BLUE, Karina Holden

Audience Awards

- Super Channel People's Choice Award – Indian Horse, Stephen Campanelli
- VIFF Most Popular International Feature – Loving Vincent, Dorota Kobiela and Hugh Welchman (Poland, UK)
- VIFF Most Popular International Documentary – Faces Places, Agnès Varda, JR (France)
- VIFF Most Popular Canadian Documentary – Shut Up and Say Something, Melanie Wood
- #mustseebc – Shut Up and Say Something, Melanie Wood

=== 2018 ===
The 37th annual Vancouver International Film Festival was held from September 27 to October 12, 2018.

BC Spotlight Awards

- Sea to Sky Award – Broken Bunny by Meredith Hama-Brown
- Best BC Film Award – Edge of the Knife, Gwaai Edenshaw and Helen Haig-Brown
- BC Emerging Filmmaker Award – Zach Lipovsky and Adam Stein, Freaks
- Best BC Short Film – Biidaaban (The Dawn Comes), Amanda Strong

Canadian Awards

- Best Canadian Film – Edge of the Knife by Gwaai Edenshaw and Helen Haig-Brown
- Emerging Canadian Director – Seán Devlin for When the Storm Fades
- Best Canadian Documentary – The Museum of Forgotten Triumphs by Bojan Bodružić
- Best Canadian Short Film – Fauve by Jérémy Comte
- Most Promising Director of a Canadian Short Film – Claire Edmondson for EXIT

Impact Awards

- VIFF Impact Award – The Devil We Know by Stephanie Soechtig

Audience Awards

- Super Channel People's Choice Award – Finding Big Country by Kathleen Jayme
- VIFF Most Popular International Feature – Shoplifters by Kore-eda Hirokazu
- VIFF Most Popular International Documentary – Bathtubs Over Broadway by Dava Whisenant
- VIFF Most Popular Canadian Feature – Edge of the Knife by Gwaai Edenshaw and Helen Haig-Brown
- #mustseebc – Finding Big Country, Kathleen Jayme

Sustainable Production Excellence Awards

- Sustainable Production Impact - X-Files, season 11
- Sustainable Production Champion - Keep it Green Recycling (Kelsey Evans); Portable Electric (Mark Rabin); Clara George; Ronny Fritsch

=== 2019 ===
The 38th annual Vancouver International Film Festival was held from September 26 to October 11, 2019.

BC Spotlight Awards

- Sea to Sky Award – Ying Wang for The World Is Bright
- Best BC Film Award – The Body Remembers When the World Broke Open by Elle-Máijá Tailfeathers and Kathleen Hepburn
- BC Emerging Filmmaker Award – Elle-Máijá Tailfeathers for The Body Remembers When the World Broke Open

Canadian Awards

- Best Canadian Film – One Day in the Life of Noah Piugattuk by Zacharias Kunuk
  - Special Mention: Blood Quantum by Jeff Barnaby
- Emerging Canadian Director – Heather Young for Murmur
  - Special Mention: Myriam Verreault for Kuessipan
- Best Canadian Documentary – Jordan River Anderson, the Messenger by Alanis Obomsawin
  - Special Mention: My Dads, My Moms and Me by Julia Ivanova
- Best Canadian Short Film – At the Bottom of the Sea by Caroline So Jung Lee
  - Special Mention: The Physics of Sorrow by Theodore Ushev
- Most Promising Director of a Canadian Short Film: Guillaume Fournier, Samuel Matteau and Yannick Nolin for Acadiana
  - Special Mention: Jessica Johnson, Ryan Ermacora for Labour/Leisure

Impact Awards

- VIFF Impact Award: Resistance Fighters by Michael Wech
- Rob Stewart Eco Warrior Award: The Pollinators by Peter Nelson

Audience Awards

- People's Choice — Parasite by Bong Joon-ho
- Most Popular Canadian Film — Red Snow by Marie Clements
- Most Popular Canadian Documentary — Haida Modern by Charles Wilkinson
- Most Popular International Documentary — Coup 53 by Taghi Amirani

=== 2020 ===
The 39th annual Vancouver International Film Festival was held from September 24 to October 7, 2020.

BC Spotlight Awards

- Sea to Sky Award — Banchi Hanuse for Nuxalk Radio
- Best BC Film Award — The Curse of Willow Song by Karen Lam
- BC Emerging Filmmaker Award — Jessie Anthony for Brother, I Cry
- Best BC Short Film — Cake Day by Phillip Thomas

Canadian Awards

- Best Canadian Film — Beans by Tracey Deer
  - Special Mention — Nadia, Butterfly by Pascal Plante
- Emerging Canadian Director — Madeleine Sims-Fewer and Dusty Mancinelli for Violation
- Best Canadian Documentary — Call Me Human by Kim O'Bomsawin
  - Special Mention — Prayer for a Lost Mitten by Jean-François Lesage
- Best Canadian Short Film — Bad Omen by Salar Pashtoonyar
  - Special Mention — Moon by Zoé Pelchat

International Awards

- VIFF Impact Award — The Reason I Jump by Jerry Rothwell
- Rob Stewart Eco Warrior Award — Peter Wohlleben, subject of The Hidden Life of Trees

VIFF Immersed Awards

- Best in Cinematic Live-Action — Kowloon Forest by Alexey Marfin
- Best in Documentary — By the Waters of Babylon by Kristen Lauth Shaeffer and Andrew Halasz
- Best in Animation — The Book of Distance by Randall Okita
- Honorable Mention in Animation — In the Land of Flabby Schnook by Francis Gélinas
- Audience Award — Ecosphere: Raja Ampat by Joseph Purdam

VIFF Immersed Volumetric Market (Microsoft Mixed Reality Capture Studios Special Prize)

- A Vocal Landscape by Omid Zarei and Anne Jeppesen
- Uninterrupted by Nettie Wild and Rae Hull

=== 2021 ===
The 40th annual Vancouver International Film Festival was held from October 1 to October 11, 2021.

BC Spotlight Awards

- Best BC Film — Handle With Care: The Legend of the Notic Streetball Crew by Jeremy Schaulin-Rioux, Kirk Thomas
- BC Emerging Filmmaker Award — Portraits From a Fire by Trevor Mack
- Best BC Short Film — The Horses (Liz Cairns)

Canadian Awards

- Best Canadian Film — Without Havana (Sin la Habana) by Kaveh Nabatian
- Emerging Canadian Director — Caroline Monnet for Bootlegger
- Best Canadian Documentary — Returning Home by Sean Stiller
- Best Canadian Short Film — Together by Albert Shin

International Awards

- Impact Award — Blue Box (Michal Weits)
- Rob Steward Eco Warrior Award — Coextinction (Gloria Pancrazi, Elena Jean)

VIFF Immersed Awards

- Cinematic Live Action — Symphony (Igor Cortadellas)
- Documentary — Inside COVID19 (Gary Yost, Adam Loften)
- Augmented Reality — Mission to Mars AR (Piotr Baczyński, Bartosz Rosłoński)
- Animation — Beat (Keisuke Itoh)
- VeeR Audience Award — Red Eyes (Sngmoo Lee)
- XR Market Grant — Memory Place (Zeynep Abes)

== Award winners by award ==
=== Most Popular Canadian Film ===
Most Popular Canadian Film

- 2002 — Expecting directed by Deborah Day and FIX: The Story of an Addicted City by Nettie Wild
- 2003 — The Corporation by Mark Achbar and Jennifer Abbott
- 2004 — What Remains of Us by François Prévost and Hugo Latulippe and Being Caribou by Leanne Allison and Diana Wilson
- 2005 — Eve and the Fire Horse by Julia Kwan
- 2006 — Mystic Ball by Greg Hamilton

Vancity People's Choice Award for Most Popular Canadian Film

- 2007 — She's a Boy I Knew by Gwen Haworth

VIFF Most Popular Canadian Film Award

- 2008 — Mothers & Daughters by Carl Bessai
- 2009 — 65 Redroses by Nimisha Mukerji and Philip Lyall
- 2010 — Two Indians Talking by Sara McIntyre
- 2011 — Starbuck by Ken Scott
- 2012 — Becoming Redwood by Jesse James Miller
- 2013 — Down River by Benjamin Ratner
- 2014 — Preggoland by Jacob Tierney
- 2015 — Room by Lenny Abrahamson (Ireland, Canada)
- 2016 — Maudie by Aisling Walsh
- 2017 — Indian Horse by Stephen Campanelli
- 2018 (VIFF Most Popular Canadian Feature) — Edge of the Knife by Gwaai Edenshaw and Helen Haig-Brown
- 2019 (Most Popular Canadian Film) — Red Snow by Marie Clements
- 2020 — Beans by Tracey Deer
- 2021 — Handle With Care: The Legend of the Notic Streetball Crew by Jeremy Schaulin-Rioux and Kirk Thomas
- 2022 — TBA

=== Most Popular International Film ===
Most Popular International Film

- 2002 — Bowling for Columbine by Michael Moore
- 2003 — Kamchatka by Marcelo Piñeyro
- 2004 — Machuca by Andrés Wood
- 2005 — Go, See, and Become by Radu Mihăileanu
- 2006 — The Lives of Others by Florian Henckel von Donnersmarck

Rogers People's Choice Award for Most Popular International Film

- 2007 — Persepolis directed by Marjane Satrapi and Vincent Paronnaud

VIFF Most Popular International First Feature Award

- 2012 — I, Anna by Barnaby Southcombe (UK)
- 2013 — Wadjda by Haifaa al-Mansour (Germany, Saudi Arabia)
- 2016 (Most Popular International Feature) — I, Daniel Blake by Ken Loach (United Kingdom, France, Belgium)
- 2017 — Loving Vincent by Dorota Kobiela and Hugh Welchman (Poland, UK)
- 2018 — Shoplifters by Kore-eda Hirokazu
