= Kroos (film) =

2019 documentary film

- Poster
- Directed by: Manfred Oldenburg
- Produced by: Leopold Hoesch
- Starring: Toni Kroos; Gudrun Kämmer; Heinz Kämmer; Amelie Kroos; Birgit Kroos; Felix Kroos; Jessica Kroos; Leon Kroos; Roland Kroos; Gareth Bale; Jaime Benito; Casemiro; Luka Modrić; Florentino Pérez; Sergio Ramos; José Ángel Sánchez; Pep Guardiola; Jupp Heynckes; Uli Hoeneß; Miroslav Klose; Joachim Löw; Matthias Sammer; Zinedine Zidane; Sascha Breese; Dirk Hebel; Volker Struth; Wolfram Eilenberger; Max Geis; Raphael Honigstein; Paul Ingendaay; Marcel Reif; Ronald Reng; Santiago Segurola; Philipp Selldorf; Robbie Williams
- Cinematography: Johannes Imdahl
- Edited by: André Hammesfahr
- Music by: Gert Wilden Jr
- Release dates: June 30, 2019 (Cologne premiere); July 4, 2019 (Germany)
- Running time: 113 minutes
- Country: Germany
- Languages: German, French, English, Spanish

Kroos is a 2019 documentary film about German professional footballer Toni Kroos. The film was directed by Manfred Oldenburg and produced by Leopold Hoesch.

== Synopsis ==
The film tells the story of national player Toni Kroos from Greifswalder SC to Real Madrid. The various stages of his career are presented and his sporting career is traced. In addition to the athletic analysis, the film provides insights into the private life of Toni Kroos. The father of three founded the Toni Kroos Foundation in 2015, which is also presented in the film.

In addition to family members of Toni Kroos – among others wife Jessica, brother Felix and his parents Birgit and Roland Kroos – the film mainly features his sporting companions. These include the coaches Pep Guardiola, Jupp Heynckes and Zinedine Zidane, the president of FC Bayern Munich, Uli Hoeneß, the president of Real Madrid, Florentino Pérez, as well as the professional footballers Gareth Bale, Luka Modrić and Sergio Ramos and even singer, entertainer and football fan Robbie Williams. In addition, football experts and journalists such as Marcel Reif and Wolfram Eilenberger comment on the development and special features of Toni Kroos and his playing style.

== Production ==
The film is a production of Broadview Pictures, funded by the Film- und Medienstiftung NRW, the FilmFernsehFonds Bayern and the Deutscher Filmförderfonds.

== Reception ==
Manfred Riepe praises the director in the magazine epd Film, because Oldenburg says in this entertaining film a little more than that the ball is round and the game lasts 90 minutes: "This film conveys itself even to those who normally don't care much about football".

On Spiegel Online, Peter Ahrens criticizes that one learns little about the main character, even though Kroos is always in the picture. "What he thinks about the world, about football, about the business, about the things in life, cannot be understood even after an hour and a half on the cinema screen (...) The deeper the film delves into the subject, the less important Toni Kroos seems to be".
