= The Last Taboo =

- German: Das letzte Tabu
- Directed by: Manfred Oldenburg
- Produced by: Leopold Hoesch
- Starring: Amal Fashanu; Thomas Hitzlsperger; Collin Martin; Matt Morton; Peter Tatchell; Marcus Urban; Vít Chalupa; Dr. Tatjana Eggeling; Morgan Hackworth; Luděk Mádl; Elijah Martin; Per Mertesacker; Dario Minden; Babak Rafati; Rolf Töpperwien; Tanja Walther-Ahrens
- Cinematography: Jonas Julian Köck
- Edited by: Dirk Hegenhahn
- Music by: Stefan Döring
- Production company: Broadview TV GmbH
- Release date: 13 February 2024
- Running time: 94 minutes
- Countries: Germany; United Kingdom; United States; Czech Republic
- Languages: German; English; Spanish; Czech

The Last Taboo is a documentary film by German filmmaker Manfred Oldenburg that deals with the topic of homophobia in professional football. The film was produced by Broadview Pictures, with Leopold Hoesch as the producer. The Last Taboo launched exclusively on Prime Video on 13 February 2024.

== Synopsis ==
The Last Taboo deals with the topic of homosexuality in professional football. The film tells the personal stories of less than ten openly homosexual professional footballers out of 500,000 active male players worldwide. Among others, Thomas Hitzlsperger, Amal Fashanu, Peter Tatchell, Collin Martin, Matt Morton, Per Mertesacker, Babak Rafati, Rolf Töpperwien, Marcus Urban, Dario Minden, Tatjana Eggeling and Tanja Walther-Ahrens are featured.

The documentary film focuses on the experiences and conflicts of these individuals, from self-denial to liberation through their coming out. It questions why homosexuality is still a taboo subject in football and challenges society's perception and handling of this topic.

== Production ==
The multi-award-winning producer Leopold Hoesch is responsible for the production. The film is a Broadview Pictures production, with Felix Gottschalk and Peter Wolf as creative producers. Manfred Oldenburg, who has received several awards for his documentaries in the past, directed the film.

== Publication ==
The Last Taboo was released exclusively on Prime Video on 13 February 2024 in German speaking countries.

== Reception ==
The Last Taboo has garnered predominantly positive feedback in the German press, with various aspects of the film being praised.

The Süddeutsche Zeitung emphasizes that the documentary "does not make answering this question easy. (...) 'The Last Taboo' takes the time to present the topic in all its ambivalence." Similarly, the film is praised for being thoroughly researched and crafted with great effort, allowing "those who are the subject" to speak.

The Passauer Neue Presse highlights that The Last Taboo opens up a new perspective within the football world by letting the homosexual footballers speak for themselves and thereby showing what it's like to play in an environment that forces them to keep their identity secret.

Der Freitag also stresses: "From all these portrayals, a great deal of empathy is evident – yet Manfred Oldenburg manages not to slip into a narrative of victimhood."

The Frankfurter Allgemeine Zeitung praises the film for managing to "generate great optimism" despite its unvarnished portrayal of the issue.

Der Standard also writes that the documentary "brings the topic vividly to the fore and gives hope."

Queer.de emphasizes: "That the film now gathers stories of footballers who have come out and extensively lets the actors speak for themselves is at least a good start."

Rory Smith also devotes his football column in The New York Times to the film The Last Taboo.
