= Ordinary Men: The "Forgotten Holocaust" =

- Directed by: Manfred Oldenburg, Oliver Halmburger
- Music by: Stefan Ziethen
- Country of origin: Germany
- Original language: German

Production
- Producer: Leopold Hoesch
- Cinematography: Domenic Barbero, Tobias Corts, Jonas Köck, Ed Regan, Björn Schneider, Florian Ungerer, Sebastian Woithe, Florian Eppple
- Editors: Dirk Hergenhahn, André Hammesfahr
- Production company: Broadview TV

Original release
- Network: ZDF
- Release: 2022

Ordinary Men: The "Forgotten Holocaust" (German: Ganz normale Männer – Der „vergessene Holocaust“) is a German documentary film by director Manfred Oldenburg and producer Leopold Hoesch from 2021. The film was broadcast on ZDF on 25 January 2022.

== Synopsis ==
Seventy-five years after the end of the Nuremberg trial of the Major War Criminals, this documentary takes a look at another trial that made history. The Einsatzgruppen trial against members of four death squads from the security police and SD, the security service of the SS, is considered the largest murder trial in history. Tens of thousands of Germans belonged to the mobile commandos of the Einsatzgruppen and police battalions. The film takes a look at who these men were and how they were able to commit such crimes, as well as what the few survivors reported and how they were able to escape the mass murder. These concepts work hand-in-hand with historical theories of German collective guilt, or lack of it -- as discussed in books like Ordinary Men: Reserve Police Battalion 101 and the Final Solution in Poland by historian Christopher Browning.

Director Manfred Oldenburg traces the path of one of the murder battalions using written records, original documents, film footage and photos as well as scenic reconstructions. Historians and social psychologists give their opinions.

Benjamin Ferencz plays a central role in the film. The American lawyer made world history and was chief prosecutor in Nuremberg against leading members of the so-called "Einsatzgruppen". A recent in-depth interview with Ferencz, who then was one hundred and one years old, forms a key element of the film.

Historians Christopher Browning, Hillary Earl, and Stephen Klemp help provide the historical framework for the film. They are part of filmed interviews and voice over narration of the film. The film largely draws from Browning’s previous work in his 1992 book Ordinary Men: Reserve Police Battalion 101 and the Final Solution in Poland.

German social psychologist Harald Welzer and sociologist Stefan Kuhl provide a glimpse into the psyche of the men of Reserve Battalion 101. They try to answer the psychological question of how these ordinary men were able to commit such crimes.

== Production and distribution ==
The film is a co-production of Broadview Pictures and ZDF. It was released on the streaming platform Netflix 6 June 2023.
