= A Rustling of Leaves: Inside the Philippine Revolution =

1988 Canadian documentary film

- Directed by: Nettie Wild
- Written by: Nettie Wild
- Produced by: Nettie Wild; Robert Porter
- Narrated by: Nettie Wild
- Cinematography: Kirk Tougas
- Edited by: Peter Wintonick
- Music by: Joey Ayala
- Production company: Kalasikas Productions
- Distributed by: Kalasikas Productions (Canada); The Empowerment Project (United States); Films Transit (Internationally)
- Release date: October 13, 1988 (VIFF)
- Running time: 112 minutes
- Country: Canada
- Language: English
- Budget: $500,000-521,000
- Box office: $110,170

A Rustling of Leaves: Inside the Philippine Revolution is a 1988 Canadian documentary by Nettie Wild about the political upheaval in the Philippines following the fall of Ferdinand Marcos and the People Power Revolution.

Wild went to the Philippines in the early 1980s to study its theatre culture. She became interested in the New People's Army and planned on making a documentary on them. She unsuccessfully proposed the idea to multiple organizations before the National Film Board of Canada and Channel 4 financed the project. Wild planned to start filming in early 1986, but Corazon Aquino's victory delayed the project. Filming restarted during a ceasefire and negotiations between Aquino's government and the NPA, but they had difficulty filming in the mountains and the NPA cancelling events. Wild expanded the scope of the film to cover the political scene of the Philippines rather than just the NPA.

The film premiered at the Vancouver International Film Festival, after being rejected by the Montreal World Film Festival and Toronto Festival of Festivals, and received positive reviews.

== Production ==
=== Development and financing ===
Nettie Wild made a theatre show, Under the Gun-A Disarming Review, about Canada's support for military dictators, including Ferdinand Marcos, in 1983. She received a $8,000 grant from the Canada Council to study the theatre culture of the Philippines and a grant from the National Film Board of Canada to make a film about indigenous Filipino theatre. She went to the Philippines in 1985, and met with the New People's Army. Wild decided to make a documentary about the NPA and made an agreement with the NPA in which she would be allowed to film a gathering of the people's revolutionary court, the Sparrows, and a raid by the NPA.

Wild made two proposals with Chris Pinney, a film distributor in Vancouver. One was a 30-minute film about Filipino street theatre and the other one was a 60-minute film about the NPA. The drafts were sent to the Canadian Broadcasting Corporation, CTV Television Network, PBS, Canada Council, and NFB. The thirty page draft about the NPA documentary, using the working title of Kalasikas (meaning "a rustling of leaves" in Tagalog), was more popular. Wild later chose to translate the title as "nobody could pronounce it" and instead used Kalasikas as the name of her production company.

Pinney became a producer on the film, but requested a pseudonym, Chris James, due to its political nature. They planned on starting filming in 1986, but had a difficult time finding financial support. TVOntario was interested, but chose not to finance it while the CBC declined as "Canadians aren't interested in little brown people on the other side of the world" according to Wild. Wild met with NBC, but the network demanded that it provide the crew, on-camera journalist, producers, and final edit control while Wild would be an associate producer. PBS was making a three-part series on the Philippines and considered making Wild's film a fourth part of the series, but felt that it did not structurally fit in. The film received a $15,000 grant from Canada Council Explorations.

Wild met with Peter Katadotis, the head of English-language production at the NFB, who supported the project. Pinney was on the committee that chose to hire Katadotis. Katadotis initially obtained a $10,000 grant from the Program to Assist Filmmakers in the Private Sector and later obtained over $260,000 in total for the film. He became the head of production and development at Telefilm Canada during the film's production. Pinney met with Rod Stoneman, the commission editor of Channel 4's The Eleventh Hour. Stoneman offered to buy the television rights for the film in the United Kingdom for $50,000, with the plan being for a one-hour film by the end of 1986. The film had a budget of $500,000-521,000 (equivalent to $1,153,090-1,201,520).

=== Filming ===
Production started in 1985, with Martin Duckworth as cinematographer and Aerlyn Weissman as the sound recordist. Wild, fearful of being spied on, spoke in code and used other people's phones. Katadotis told her that he was contacted by an official in the Department of Communications who stated that the Canadian Security Intelligence Service wanted every file involving Wild from the NFB as she was "a threat to national security". The Canada Council received a similar demand and the organization's offices in Ottawa were broken into and had documents related to A Rustling of Leaves stolen. John Brewin asked for an investigation into these claims, but François N. Macerola stated that he was never asked to withdraw the NFB's funding.

Wild planned to start filming in February 1986, but postponed it after Corazon Aquino's victory in the 1986 Philippine presidential election. The delay resulted in her losing her crew. Kirk Tougas was selected to be the cinematographer and Gary Marcuse as the sound recordist. A second crew, for shooting in Mindanao, was retained at a higher price. Before leaving for the Philippines she raised $7,000 from lawyers and human rights activists and another $8,000 from the United Church of Canada. The film was shot using 16 mm film and audio was recorded using a Walkman. Wild lost fourteen pounds during filming.

Wild restarted filming during a ceasefire and negotiations between Aquino's government and the NPA. $100,000 of NFB film equipment was brought to the Philippines and buried every night in case of being attacked by the Armed Forces of the Philippines. Tougas refused to film in the mountains which resulted in them focusing on legal left-wing groups in Manilla and sugar workers on Negros rather than "people with guns coming out of their noses". WIld planned on filming the NPA in the mountains with a new crew, but one hour before her plane was to leave she was told by a NPA agent that they cancelled it as they did not have editorial control. Wild decided to expand the scope of the film to be about both legal and illegal left-wing organizations. Wild interviewed Bernabe Buscayno, Ed de la Torre, and Jun Pala for the film.

They were allowed to film the NPA's trial of a soldier who deserted and was identifying NPA sympathizers. JoJo Sescon, a local Filipino photographer, attempted to film the execution of this soldier despite Wild telling him to stop and she pushed his camera away before the firing started.

=== Editing and score ===
During post-production Wild lived on a $1,000 monthly grant from the Laidlaw Foundation and four months of unpaid rent was forgiven by her housing cooperative.

Wild completed filming and returned to Canada on August 21, with 64,000 feet of film. Over the course of eight months she reduced this to 4,000 feet. She asked Peter Wintonick to edit the film and told him that "It's going to be a saving job". Wild, who had no money left, received $35,000 from the Canada Council to pay Wintonick after submitting fifteen minutes of unedited film and later received another $15,000. Wintonick came to Vancouver in November 1987,

The soundtrack, scored by Joey Ayala, was recorded in Wild's living room after Ayala set up an 8-track studio. Wild, inspired by Wintonick editing the film while listening to Talking Heads, asked David Byrne to co-score the film. Byrne declined, but allowed her to use his music without paying. The Bee Gees also allowed her to use their music without paying. Ayala was paid $1,000 and air fare.

Wild requested $12,000 from the NFB, which had already contributed $261,000, to finance the sound mixing. Barbara Janes, the NFB's director in Vancouver, was unable to contribute the money. The Laidlaw Foundation contributed $24,000 instead. She also received another $10,000 from BC Film to pay Alpha Cine to do the mixing. Sound mixing was completed by September 1988.

Telefilm gave the project another $60,000 to repay its $172,000 worth of debts and back wages, but only 65% was paid back by 1993 even with other organizational funding.

== Release ==
Wild submitted a rough-cut of the film to the Montreal World Film Festival and Toronto Festival of Festivals, but was rejected by both. Wild stated that it was because "they hated the narration". Alan Franey, the organizer of the Vancouver International Film Festival, saw the film and accepted it.

Franey wanted the film shown in the 800-seat Ridge Theatre, but Wild successfully argued for it to be shown at the Pacific Cinematheque, with less than 200 seats, instead as the Ridge Theatre would allow up to 1,600 people to see the film for free. The film was also shown at the Berlin International Film Festival and Houston International Festival.

Wild met with CBC executives about showing the film on TV, but she rejected their offer of showing a 57-minute version of the 112 minute film. Franey told her to release the film theatrically herself. It was released by Wild's Kalasikas Productions in Canada, The Empowerment Project in the United States, and internationally by Films Transit. Film Cooperativo, a Swiss company, translated the film to French and added an opening by Torre. The film was not shown in the Philippines until its release at the Daang Dokyu Film Festival in 2020.

== Reception ==
=== Box office ===
A Rustling of Leaves theatrically premiered at the Bloor Cinema on 21 April 1989, and earned $14,000 in five days. Promotion in Canada cost $10,000 and earned $58,675 after being shown 100 times in Canada by 1991, while earning $9,020 internationally. The film premiered in the United States on 24 May 1990, in Santa Monica, and earned $42,475, with Kalasikas receiving $20,101, after being shown 124 times in the country.

The CBC paid $80,000 to show the film as a part of a prime-time series of documentaries with some edits for a panel discussion. TV Cinq paid $15,000, but Wild only earned $3,000 due to dubbing and subtitling costing $26,000, although Telefilm covered most of the expenditures. WNET paid $5,000.

=== Critical response ===
Liam Lacey, writing in The Globe and Mail, stated that the film was "dynamic and disturbing". Variety's review stated that "given the conditions under which pic was shot, quality of image is remarkable and cutting effective". Alex Esclamado accused the film of being communist propaganda and refused to review it.

Marc Horton, writing in the Edmonton Journal, gave the film three stars and praised it for giving "an interesting view of the politics of the Philippines", "a high level of candor with all parts of the spectrum", and the sophistication of the film's soundtrack, cinematography, and editing. Kevin Thomas, writing in the Los Angeles Times, stated that the film "offers a disturbing, comprehensive and illuminating survey of the enormous challenges facing Filipinos".

== Accolades ==
Award	Date of ceremony	Category	Recipient(s)	Result	Ref.
Houston International Festival		Grand Prize	A Rustling of Leaves: Inside the Philippine Revolution	Won	
Genie Awards	22 March 1989	Best Feature Length Documentary	A Rustling of Leaves: Inside the Philippine Revolution	Nominated	

== Works cited ==
- Posner, Michael (1993). Canadian Dreams: The Making and Marketing of Independent Films. Canadian Independent Film Caucus. ISBN 1550541145.
- Variety's Film Reviews 1989-1990. Vol. 21. R. R. Bowker. 1991. ISBN 0835230899.
