= Moses – 13 Steps =

MOSES – 13 Steps
- 13 Steps – Die unglaubliche Karriere des Edwin Moses
- Directed by: Michael Wech
- Produced by: Leopold Hoesch
- Starring: Jody David Armour; Lonnie Bunch; Doriane Coleman; Anita DeFrantz; Donna de Varona; Manfred Germar; Danny Harris; Bernd Heller; Samuel L. Jackson; Holly Johnson Friar; Michael Johnson; Bob Kersee; Roger Kingdom; Spike Lee; John Maxwell; Gianni Merlo; Anne Merrem; Edwin Moses; Irving Moses; Julian Moses; Ulrike Nasse-Meyfarth; LaRoy Penix; Andre Phillips; Steve Price; Mike Shine; Tommie Smith; Tracy Sundlun; Delay Thompson; Milan Tiff; Travis Tygart; Neil Degrasse Tyson; Karsten Warholm; Ken Yoshino; Josiah Young III
- Edited by: André Hammesfahr
- Music by: Stefan Döring
- Release date: 2024
- Running time: 105 minutes
- Country: Germany
- Languages: English, German

MOSES – 13 Steps is a 2024 documentary film about American track and field athlete Edwin Moses. The film was directed by Michael Wech and produced by Leopold Hoesch.

== Synopsis ==
The feature-length documentary MOSES – 13 Steps (German title: 13 Steps – Die unglaubliche Karriere des Edwin Moses) offers an in-depth exploration of Moses’s unprecedented dominance in the 400-metre hurdles and his broader impact on sport and society.

The title refers to Moses’s innovative 13-step technique, developed while studying physics at Morehouse College, which became central to his strategy and helped propel him through a historic 122-race winning streak spanning nine years, nine months, and nine days. The documentary traces his journey from his early years in segregated America to his athletic triumphs – including Olympic gold medals in 1976 and 1984 – as well as his legacy as a scientist, reformer, and advocate for equality, anti-doping measures, and athletes’ rights.

== Production ==
The film is a production of Broadview Pictures, directed by Michael Wech, produced by Leopold Hoesch and executive produced by Morgan Freeman, Lori McCreary, Scott Borden, James Younger, and Vera Bertram.

== Release ==
The film premiered at DOC NYC, where it featured a Q&A session following the screening with producer Leopold Hoesch and was also shown at the Boulder International Film Festival. Additionally, it received the Best Feature Film award at the inaugural OLY House Film Festival in Paris, selected for its powerful exploration of Moses’s legacy and societal contributions.

Further screenings and festival selections include the Montreal and Toronto Black Film Festivals, the Film Festival Cologne, the San Diego International Film Festival, the Annapolis Film Festival, the Morehouse College Human Rights Film Festival and the Paladino d'oro Sport Film Festival.

The film was released in German cinemas in December 2024. In September 2025, it became available to stream on the ARD Mediathek.
