= Chad Willett =

Canadian actor and producer (born 1971)

- Born: Chad D. Willett; October 10, 1971 (age 54); New Westminster, British Columbia, Canada
- Occupations: Actor; producer
- Years active: 1993—present
- Awards: Leo Award (2010)
- Website: chad-willett.com (defunct)

Chad D. Willett (born October 10, 1971, in New Westminster, British Columbia), is a Canadian actor and producer who has worked for over 30 years as a professional in film, television and theatre. His selected films include Alive, directed by Frank Marshall and produced by Kathleen Kennedy. Hector and the Search for Happiness, starring Simon Pegg, Monster Trucks directed by Chris Wedge, Broken Diamonds alongside Ben Platt and Lola Kirke and Steal This Movie with Vincent D'Onofrio

Willett produced and starred in the film Becoming Redwood in 2011. The film won the 2012 Vancouver International Film Festival Most Popular Canadian Film Award. In 2010, Willett received a Leo Award for his portrayal of the small town redneck antagonist in the film Cole, directed by Carl Bessai. His most recent role was in the 2021 TV movie A Dickens of a Holiday!, until he landed a recurring role as Coach Jensen in the Amazon Prime Video series Off Campus in 2026.

== Career ==
In the CBS miniseries, Joan of Arc, Willett starred alongside Leelee Sobieski, Peter O’Toole, and Shirley MacLaine. In the CBS event movie, The Locket, he worked with Academy Award winner Vanessa Redgrave, as a young man caring for an aging lady in a nursing home.

Other notable television credits include series regular roles on The Chronicle, Jack & Jill, Charmed, Madison, The Cape, and guest appearances on House M.D., Bones, NCIS, Human Target, The Secret Circle, Supernatural.

Willett's theatre credits include the Pulitzer Prize-winning play, Proof, at the Cleveland Play House and As Bees in Honey Drown, at the Pasadena Playhouse, the California state theatre.

== Filmography ==
- Alive (1993)
- Madison (TV series) (1993—95)
- The X-Files (1994)
- The Outer Limits (1996)
- The Cape (1996 TV series) (1996—1997)
- Nothing Too Good for a Cowboy (1998)
- Dead Man's Gun (1998)
- Joan of Arc (1999, miniseries)
- The Long Kill (1999)
- Jack & Jill (1999—2000)
- Columbo (2000)
- Charmed (2001)
- The Chronicle (2001—2002)
- The Locket (2002, TV movie)
- 12 Days of Christmas Eve (2004, TV movie)
- NCIS (TV series) (2005)
- Carolina Moon (2007)
- House (2007)
- Supernatural (2009)
- Bones (2009)
- Cole (2009)
- Human Target (2010)
- For Christ's Sake (2010)
- Becoming Redwood (2012)
- The Secret Circle (2012)
- Haven (2012)
- When Calls the Heart (2014)
- Motive (2014)
- Hector and the Search for Happiness (2014)
- Monster Trucks (2017)
- Beyond (2017-2018)
- Colony (2018)
- The Good Doctor (2018)
- Broken Diamonds (2021)
- Big Sky (2021)
- A Dickens of a Holiday! (2021, TV movie)
- Off Campus (2026)
