= The Physics of Sorrow =

- Film poster
- Directed by: Theodore Ushev
- Based on: The Physics of Sorrow by Georgi Gospodinov
- Narrated by: Rossif Sutherland
- Production company: National Film Board of Canada
- Release date: September 7, 2019 (TIFF)
- Running time: 27 minutes
- Country: Canada

The Physics of Sorrow (French: Physique de la tristesse) is a Canadian animated short film, directed by Theodore Ushev and released in 2019. The film explores themes of memory, time, displacement, and identity through the fragmented reflections of a nameless protagonist who recalls his childhood in post-communist Bulgaria and his subsequent emigration to Canada.

== Summary ==
Based on the novel by Bulgarian writer Georgi Gospodinov, the film tells the story of a man reminiscing about his childhood as he struggles to understand the meaning and purpose of his life.

== Production ==
The film was animated entirely through encaustic painting, an old artistic technique involving the melting of pigmented beeswax. It was narrated by Rossif Sutherland, and features a smaller voice appearance by his father, Donald Sutherland.

== Release and reception ==
The film premiered at the 2019 Toronto International Film Festival, where it received an honourable mention from the Best Canadian Short Film award jury. It also received a Special Mention for Best Canadian Short Film at the 2019 Vancouver International Film Festival, and was named Best Canadian Film at the 2019 Sommets du cinéma d'animation.

=== Accolades ===
In December 2019, the film was named to TIFF's annual year-end Canada's Top Ten list for short films. It was shortlisted for the Academy Award for Best Animated Short Film in 2019, and won the Prix Iris for Best Animated Short Film at the 22nd Quebec Cinema Awards in 2020. The Physics of Sorrow also won a Golden Sheaf Award for Best Animation at the 2020 Yorkton Film Festival. In 2020 the film won "the Annecy Cristal" (le Cristal d'Annecy) at the Annecy International Animation Film Festival.
