= 65 Redroses =

65_Redroses
- Directed by: Philip Lyall; Nimisha Mukerji
- Written by: Nettie Wild
- Produced by: Philip Lyall; Nimisha Mukerji; John Ritchie
- Starring: Eva Markvoort
- Cinematography: Mike Rae
- Edited by: Justin Cousineau; Philip Lyall; Nimisha Mukerji
- Music by: Adam Locke-Norton
- Production companies: Force Four Entertainment in association with CBC Newsworld; Dualogue Productions
- Release date: October 9, 2009 (VIFF)
- Running time: 70 minutes
- Country: Canada
- Language: English

65_RedRoses is a 2009 documentary film about Eva Markvoort, a young woman from New Westminster, British Columbia, who suffered from cystic fibrosis. Directed by Philip Lyall and Nimisha Mukerji, it follows Markvoort as she lives her life undaunted by her disease, waiting for a lung transplant while blogging about her experiences.

== Production ==
The film began when Philip Lyall, a long-time friend of Markvoort, introduced her to his University of British Columbia film school partner Nimisha Mukerji. Lyall and Mukerji had been looking for a post-graduation project and decided to chronicle Markvoort's wait for a double-lung transplant. They named the film 65_Redroses after Eva's online identity, which she had chosen because, according to the Canadian cystic fibrosis community, "sixty-five roses" is how many young children with the disease mispronounce "cystic fibrosis". Eva added 'red' because it was her favourite colour.

When Lyall and Mukerji began shooting, Markvoort's lungs were so clogged doctors said that without a transplant, she would not live to 2009. She was getting ready to visit a pumpkin patch the week before Halloween in 2007, when her pager went off, a signal to call the hospital transplant center. A pair of lungs was available for transplant. This sequence, emotional for both Markvoort and the filmmakers, was instrumental in attracting the attention and backing of the Canadian Broadcasting Corporation.

== Release ==
65_Redroses premiered at the Hot Docs Canadian International Documentary Festival and won three awards at the Vancouver International Film Festival, including most popular Canadian film and documentary. It debuted on television on CBC's The Passionate Eye series and was acquired by the Public Broadcasting Service for international distribution.

On November 16, 2010, it was announced that 65_Redroses had been acquired by the Oprah Winfrey Network and would premiere in the United States in early 2011.

Hello Cool World is the distributor of the film in Canada.
