= The Locket (2002 film) =

2002 American TV movie

- Written by: Richard Paul Evans; Ron Paley
- Directed by: Karen Arthur
- Starring: Vanessa Redgrave; Chad Willett; Marguerite Moreau
- Music by: Bruce Broughton
- Country of origin: United States
- Original language: English

Production
- Producers: Brent Shields; Richard Welsh; Gordon Wolf
- Cinematography: Tom Neuwirth
- Editor: Sabrina Plisco
- Running time: 100 min

Original release
- Network: CBS
- Release: December 8, 2002

The Locket is a 2002 Hallmark Hall of Fame psychological drama television film starring Vanessa Redgrave. The film is a screen adaptation of Richard Paul Evans' novel of the same name, adapted and directed by Karen Arthur. It premiered on December 8, 2002 on CBS.

== Plot ==
Esther is a disillusioned and bitter nursing home resident who shares much with her attendant, Michael, in terms of personal sacrifices that they have both made. Esther also hides a dark secret. Michael has spent the last several years of his life looking after his cancer-stricken late mother and now faces rejection from his fiancée's father. Michael makes it his mission to improve the last years of Esther's life.

Aided with a locket with her lost love's photograph, Michael searches for the elusive love of Esther's life. But ironically it is Esther that does the greatest favours for Michael. She vouches for him when he's accused of a murder in the nursing home, and helps put him back in contact with his fiancée and estranged father. Just before dying, Esther gives Michael the ring from her past love, hoping he will give it to his fiancée.

== Cast ==
- Vanessa Redgrave as Esther Huish
- Chad Willett as Michael Keddington
- Marguerite Moreau as Faye Murrow
- Lori Heuring as Alice Richards
- Lourdes Benedicto as Amanda Ibarra
- Terry O'Quinn as Casey Keddington
- Brock Peters as Henry McCord
- Mary McDonnell as Helen Staples

== Awards ==
CAMIE Awards: Character and Morality in Entertainment Award (won)

Hollywood Makeup Artist and Hair Stylist Guild Awards: Best Hair Styling - Television Mini-Series/Movie of the Week - Steven Mack, Gina Maran (won)
