= Broken Diamonds =

- Theatrical release poster
- Directed by: Peter Sattler
- Written by: Steve Waverly
- Produced by: Thad Luckinbill; Trent Luckinbill; Molly Smith; Rachel Smith; Trina Wyatt
- Starring: Ben Platt; Lola Kirke; Alphonso McAuley; Yvette Nicole Brown; Chad Willett; Lynda Boyd
- Cinematography: Bryce Fortner
- Edited by: Robert Hoffman
- Music by: Keegan DeWitt; Dabney Morris
- Production company: Black Label Media
- Distributed by: FilmRise
- Release dates: April 1, 2021 (Santa Barbara); July 23, 2021 (United States)
- Country: United States
- Language: English

Broken Diamonds is a 2021 American drama film directed by Peter Sattler from a screenplay by Steve Waverly. It stars Ben Platt, Lola Kirke, Yvette Nicole Brown, Alphonso McAuley, and Lynda Boyd.

The film had its world premiere at the Santa Barbara International Film Festival on April 1, 2021. It was released on July 23, 2021, by FilmRise.

== Premise ==
In the wake of his father's death, a twenty-something writer sees his dream of moving to Paris put in jeopardy when he's forced to temporarily take in his wildly unpredictable, mentally ill sister.

== Cast ==
- Ben Platt as Scott
- Lola Kirke as Cindy
- Yvette Nicole Brown as Cookie
- Alphonso McAuley
- Lynda Boyd as Mom
- Chad Willett as Leeland Weaver
- Amanda Fix as Young Cindy
- Debs Howard as Julia

== Production ==
In March 2018, it was announced Ben Platt had been cast in the film, which was originally titled Love and Oatmeal, with Peter Sattler directing from a screenplay by Steve Waverly. Molly Smith, Rachel Smith, Thad Luckinbill, Trent Luckinbill, and Trina Wyatt will produce the film, while Jon Schumacher will executive produce the film under their Black Label Media banner. In May 2018, Lola Kirke joined the cast of the film. In June 2018, Yvette Nicole Brown and Alphonso McAuley joined the cast of the film.

=== Filming ===
Principal photography began on June 4, 2018, in Vancouver.

== Release ==
The film had its world premiere at the Santa Barbara International Film Festival on April 1, 2021. Prior to, FilmRise acquired global distribution rights to the film.

It was released on July 23, 2021.
