= Ryan Grantham =

Canadian actor and murderer (born 1998)

- Born: November 30, 1998 (age 27); Squamish, British Columbia, Canada
- Education: Simon Fraser University (formerly)
- Occupation: Former actor
- Years active: 2007‒2019
- Criminal charges: Second-degree murder
- Criminal penalty: Life in prison with no parole eligibility for 14 years
- Criminal status: Incarcerated

Ryan Grantham (born November 30, 1998) is a Canadian former actor and convicted murderer. His acting career primarily involved small roles, with him having featured in Diary of a Wimpy Kid and Riverdale.

He was charged with second-degree murder for killing his mother and was sentenced in September 2022 to life imprisonment with a chance of parole after 14 years.

== Early life ==
Ryan Grantham was born on November 30, 1998, to Barbara Waite in Squamish, British Columbia, Canada. He started out as a child actor while also enrolled in acting schools. Grantham began working in the entertainment industry at nine years old in 2007 with The Secret of the Nutcracker. His mother and younger sister supported his aspiration to become an actor, and in 2020, he was enrolled in Simon Fraser University. However, he missed all of his classes due to his heavy drinking and marijuana usage which was attributed to his depression. Grantham also had suicidal thoughts.

== Career ==
Grantham made his acting debut in the 2007 television film The Secret of the Nutcracker, playing the role of Billy. In addition, he has also been in numerous TV shows and movies including Supernatural, iZombie and Becoming Redwood with his last role being in 2019 as Jeffery Augustine for Riverdale.

=== Filmography ===
Year	Title	Role	Notes
2007	The Secret of the Nutcracker	Billy	
2008	Storm Cell	Young Sean	
2008	Trial by Fire	Little Boy	
2009	Riese: Kingdom Falling	Young Arkin	
2009	Santa Buddies	Sam	
2010	Diary of a Wimpy Kid	Rodney James	
2010	Goblin	Ben	
2010	Altitude	Bruce	
2010	Ice Quake	Shane Webster	
2010	Battle of the Bulbs	Tim Wallace	
2011	Marley & Me: The Puppy Years	Moose	
2012	Barricade	Jack Shade	
2012	Smart Cookies	Dax	
2012	12 Disasters	Peter	
2013	The Carpenter's Miracle	Luke	
2013	Becoming Redwood	Redwood	
2014	Way of the Wicked	Young Robbie	
2015	Perfect High	Robbie	
2016	Considering Love and Other Magic	Tommy	
2019	Undercover Cheerleader	Max	
2019	Riverdale	Jeffery Augustine	

== Murder ==
On March 31, 2020, Grantham shot his 64-year-old mother in the head with a .22 rifle as she was playing the piano. After the murder, he filmed his mother's corpse with a GoPro while saying "I shot her in the back of the head. In the moments after, she would have known it was me". He covered his mother's body with a blanket and rosary before surrounding her body with lit candles. In his March 31 diary entry, he wrote "I'm so sorry Mum, I'm so sorry Lisa ‒ I hate myself. There's a lot of media of me out there, film and TV, hundreds of hours of me that can be viewed and dissected. No one will understand." He watched Netflix, drank beer, and smoked marijuana for hours before going to sleep. Grantham's sister Lisa visited their home and discovered the crime scene on April 1 after not receiving her daily calls or texts from her mother.

A day later, Grantham packed his car with 12 Molotov cocktails, three guns, ammunition, and camping supplies. He then drove east, planning to either assassinate Canadian prime minister Justin Trudeau or go on a rampage at Simon Fraser University or Lions Gate Bridge. However, Grantham ultimately canceled his plan, and turned around at Hope, British Columbia, to drive back to the Vancouver police headquarters to turn himself in.

His sentencing began on June 13, 2022. His lawyer argued that he did it due to his mental illness, including an intense period of clinical depression. Prosecutors stated he committed a "heartbreaking breach of trust," saying his mother was an excellent parent and she had no reason to fear him.

On September 23, 2022, Grantham pleaded guilty to charges of second-degree murder and was sentenced at the British Columbia Supreme Court to life in prison. In a court statement, Grantham said "In the face of something so horrible, saying sorry seems so pointless. But from every fibre of my being, I am sorry. I cannot explain or justify my actions. I have no excuse. It hurts me to think about how badly I've wasted my life". He will not be eligible for parole until 2036. Grantham has also been receiving psychiatric help while in prison.
