= Eva Markvoort =

Canadian woman who suffered and died from cystic fibrosis

Eva Markvoort (March 31, 1984 – March 27, 2010) was a woman from New Westminster, British Columbia, Canada who died from cystic fibrosis at the age of 25. She blogged about her life, family and experiences, including undergoing a lung transplant and her subsequent transplant rejection, in her blog "65_Redroses," which is also the name of a documentary film about her, 65_Redroses.

Markvoort's online identity is based on Canadian cystic fibrosis community lore that "65 roses" is a malapropism among children for the disease of "cystic fibrosis". Eva added 'red' because it was her favourite colour. She was also awarded the title of Miss New Westminster in 2002.

Despite early success following her double lung transplant in 2007, Markvoort died on March 27, 2010, at Vancouver General Hospital after a long battle with transplant rejection, while awaiting a second lung transplant. Shortly before her death, the 25-year-old theatre student received her degree from the University of Victoria at her hospital bedside.

On March 25, Markvoort wrote the last post on her blog:

I am not managing, not managing at all. I'm drowning in the medications. I can't breathe. Every hour. Once an hour. I can't breathe. Something has to change.

Markvoort had recorded an emotional farewell video on February 11, saying she likely had only days to live. These last spoken words to her web community drew more than 150,000 views in less than 24 hours. In addition to her degree, she also received the Cystic Fibrosis Canada's Doug Summerhayes award for outstanding commitment to the cause. She was also a recipient of the Queen Elizabeth II Golden Jubilee Medal.

On April 30, 2010, Markvoort's family held a memorial service that was attended and watched by thousands of people, around the world. The celebration was streamed live to Eva's blog for her followers who could not attend in person. A version has been edited by Justin Cousineau and posted on Eva's blog, which continues to be updated by her family.
