= Nowitzki. The Perfect Shot =

- Nowitzki. Der perfekte Wurf
- Directed by: Sebastian Dehnhardt
- Written by: Sebastian Dehnhardt
- Produced by: Leopold Hoesch
- Starring: Dirk Nowitzki; Holger Geschwindner; Kobe Bryant; Michael Finley; Yao Ming; Steve Nash; Jason Kidd; Vince Carter; Mark Cuban; Rick Carlisle; Donnie Nelson; Helmut Schmidt
- Cinematography: Johannes Imdahl
- Edited by: André Hammesfahr
- Release date: 16 September 2014
- Running time: 105 minutes
- Country: Germany
- Languages: German, English

Nowitzki. The Perfect Shot is a German documentary film produced by Leopold Hoesch depicting the career of Dirk Nowitzki from the second German Basketball League to the NBA. The films premiered on 16 September 2014 in Cologne.

== Synopsis ==
The film depicts the relationship between Dirk Nowitzki and his personal coach and mentor Holger Geschwindner. Geschwindner developed Nowitzki's talent with various means including science to improve Nowitzki's jump shots. The film features basketball footage and personalities such as Nowitzki, players Kobe Bryant, Yao Ming, Steve Nash, Michael Finley, and Jason Kidd, coaches Don Nelson and Rick Carlisle, Dallas Mavericks owner Mark Cuban, NBA commissioner David Stern, and former German Chancellor Helmut Schmidt.

== Background ==
The film is produced by Broadview TV and supported with means by the Filmcommission NRW and the German Federal Film Fund (DFFF). In the summer of 2014, over 100.000 Euros was generated within 24 hours through the online marketspace Zencap for its international distribution.

The song All Night by Parov Stelar was used in the credits.

== Awards ==
The film was nominated for the German Film Award 2015, the 18th Shanghai International Film Festival and the 2015 Dallas International Film Festival.
