= Becoming Redwood =

- Promotional poster
- Directed by: Jesse James Miller
- Written by: Jesse James Miller
- Produced by: Joely Collins; Chad Willett
- Starring: Ryan Grantham; Jennifer Copping; Chad Willett
- Cinematography: David Crone
- Edited by: Charlie Renfrew
- Music by: Schaun Tozer
- Production company: Storylab Productions
- Release date: 11 October 2012 (VIFF)
- Running time: 99 minutes
- Country: Canada
- Language: English

Becoming Redwood is a 2012 Canadian film written and directed by Jesse James Miller, and starring Ryan Grantham, Jennifer Copping, and Chad Willett. In the film, 11-year-old Redwood (Grantham) believes he can bring his parents back together by beating Jack Nicklaus at the 1975 Masters golf tournament.

Robert Bell suggests that the film has "constant nods to Wes Anderson."

== Accolades ==
Becoming Redwood won Most Popular Canadian Film at the 2012 Vancouver International Film Festival, and received an honorable mention from the Best Canadian Film jury.

It was nominated for the Vancouver Film Critics Circle Award for Best British Columbia Film at the Vancouver Film Critics Circle Awards 2012.
