= 2021 Vancouver International Film Festival =

2021 Canadian film festival

- Opening film: The Electrical Life of Louis Wain
- Closing film: Petite Maman
- Location: Vancouver, British Columbia, Canada
- Founded: 1958
- No. of films: 190
- Festival date: October 1–11, 2021
- Website: VIFF

Vancouver International Film Festival
- 41st 39th

The 2021 Vancouver International Film Festival, the 40th event in the history of the Vancouver International Film Festival, was held from October 1 to October 11, 2021. Unlike the 2020 Vancouver International Film Festival, which was staged entirely online due to the COVID-19 pandemic, the 2021 festival featured in-person screenings at the VIFF Centre and other venues, although most titles were also available on the online VIFF Connects platform.

The festival opened with the film The Electrical Life of Louis Wain, and closed with the film Petite Maman. 190 films from 51 countries where screened in the festival constituting 113 features, 77 shorts, 80 narrative features and 33 documentary features.

In addition, the festival screened some titles outside Vancouver, including in Terrace and Powell River. Some, but not all, titles on the online platform were available for viewing across Canada rather than being geoblocked to British Columbia.

== Awards ==
Audience-voted awards were announced on October 13 following the end of the festival; however, the juried award winners were announced during the festival as a technique to help publicize and promote the winning films.

Award	Film	Filmmaker
Audience Award, Galas & Special Presentations	Official Competition (Competencia oficial)	Gastón Duprat & Mariano Cohn
Audience Award, Contemporary World Cinema	The In-Laws (Tesciowie)	Kuba Michalczuk
Audience Award, True North	Handle With Care: The Legend of the Notic Streetball Crew	Jeremy Schaulin-Rioux, Kirk Thomas
Audience Award, Gateway	Time	Ricky Ko
Audience Award, Impact	Little Palestine: Diary of an Occupation	Abdallah Al-Khatib
Audience Award, Insights	The Six	Arthur Jones
Audience Award, M/A/D	Charlotte	Eric Warin, Tahir Rana
Audience Award, Altered States	Saloum	Jean Luc Herbulot
Best Canadian Film	Without Havana (Sin la Habana)	Kaveh Nabatian
Best Canadian Documentary	Returning Home	Sean Stiller
Best Canadian Short Film	Together	Albert Shin
Emerging Canadian Director	Bootlegger	Caroline Monnet
Best BC Film	Handle With Care: The Legend of the Notic Streetball Crew	Jeremy Schaulin-Rioux, Kirk Thomas
Best BC Short Film	The Horses	Liz Cairns
BC Emerging Filmmaker	Portraits from a Fire	Trevor Mack
VIFF Impact Award	Blue Box	Michal Weits
Rob Stewart Eco Warrior Award	Coextinction	Gloria Pancrazi, Elena Jean
Immersed (Virtual Reality Program), Best Cinematic Live Action	Symphony	Igor Cortadellas
Immersed, Best Documentary	Inside COVID19	Gary Yost, Adam Loften
Immersed, Best Augmented Reality	Mission to Mars AR	Piotr Baczyński, Bartosz Rosłoński
Immersed, Best Animation	Beat	Keisuke Itoh
Immersed, Best Animation Honorable Mention	The Passengers	Ziad Touma
Immersed, Audience Award	Red Eyes	Sngmoo Lee

== Films ==
=== Special presentations ===
English title	Original title	Director(s)	Production country
All My Puny Sorrows		Michael McGowan	Canada
Belfast		Kenneth Branagh	United Kingdom, Ireland
Benediction		Terence Davies	United Kingdom, United States
Bergman Island		Mia Hansen-Løve	France, Mexico, Brazil, Germany
Drive My Car	Doraibu mai kā	Ryusuke Hamaguchi	Japan
The Electrical Life of Louis Wain		Will Sharpe	United Kingdom, United States
Everything Went Fine	Tout s'est bien passé	François Ozon	France
Memoria		Apichatpong Weerasethakul	Thailand, Colombia, France, Germany, Mexico, China
Mothering Sunday		Eva Husson	United Kingdom
Night Raiders		Danis Goulet	Canada
Official Competition	Competencia oficial	Gastón Duprat & Mariano Cohn	Spain
One Second	秒钟	Zhang Yimou	China
Petite Maman		Céline Sciamma	France
Red Rocket		Sean Baker	United States
The Worst Person in the World	Verdens verste menneske	Joachim Trier	Norway

=== Contemporary World Cinema ===
English title	Original title	Director(s)	Production country
Azor		Andreas Fontana	Argentina, France, Switzerland
The Beta Test		Jim Cummings, PJ McCabe	United States
Bone Marrow		Hamid Reza Ghorbani	Iran
The Book of Delights	O Livro dos Prazeres	Marcela Lordy	Brazil
Brighton 4th		Levan Koguashvili	Georgia, Russia, Bulgaria, Monaco, United States
Brother's Keeper	Okul Tıraşı	Ferit Karahan	Turkey, Romania
Bye Bye Morons	Adieu les cons	Albert Dupontel	France
Celts	Kelti	Milica Tomović	Serbia
Clara Sola		Nathalie Álvarez Mesén	Sweden, Costa Rica, Belgium, Germany
Compartment No. 6	Hytti nro 6	Juho Kuosmanen	Finland, Estonia, Germany, Russia
Fabian – Going to the Dogs	Fabian oder Der Gang vor die Hunde	Dominik Graf	Germany
Father Pablo	Padre Pablo	José Luis Isoard Arrubarrena	Mexico
The Girl and the Spider	Das Mädchen und die Spinne	Ramon Zürcher, Silvan Zürcher	Switzerland
Girlfriends	Chavalas	Carol Rodríguez Colás	Spain
Godavari		Nikhil Mahajan	India
Havel		Slávek Horák	Czech Republic
Him	Han	Guro Bruusgaard	Norway
Hit the Road	Jadde Khaki	Panah Panahi	Iran
The In-Laws	Tesciowie	Kuba Michalczuk	Poland
Lamya's Poem		Alex Kronemer	Canada, United States
Miracle	Miracol	Bogdan George Apetri	Romania, Czech Republic, Latvia
Paris, 13th District	Les Olympiades	Jacques Audiard	France
Queen of Glory		Nana Mensah	United States
The Siamese Bond	Las siamesas	Paula Hernández	Argentina
Small Body	Piccolo Corpo	Laura Samani	Italy, France, Slovenia
Souad		Ayten Amin	Egypt, Tunisia, Germany
A Tale of Love and Desire	Une histoire d'amour et de désir	Leyla Bouzid	France, Tunisia
Unclenching the Fists	Разжимая кулаки	Kira Kovalenko	Russia
What Do We See When We Look at the Sky?	Ras vkhedavt, rodesac cas vukurebt?	Alexandre Koberidze	Germany, Georgia

=== True North ===
English title	Original title	Director(s)
Be Still		Elizabeth Lazebnik
The Boathouse		Hannah Cheesman
Bootlegger		Caroline Monnet
Coextinction		Gloria Pancrazi, Elena Jean
Damascus Dreams		Émilie Serri
Darkroom		Lukas Maier
Drunken Birds	Les Oiseaux ivres	Ivan Grbovic
Handle With Care: The Legend of the Notic Streetball Crew		Jeremy Schaulin-Rioux, Kirk Thomas
Hands That Bind		Kyle Armstrong
Islands		Martin Edralin
The Last Tourist		Tyson Sadler
Learn to Swim		Thyrone Tommy
Night Blooms		Stephanie Joline
Portraits from a Fire		Trevor Mack
Quickening		Haya Waseem
Returning Home		Sean Stiller
Ste. Anne		Rhayne Vermette
See for Me		Randall Okita
The White Fortress	Tabija	Igor Drljaca
Wildhood		Bretten Hannam
Without Havana	Sin la Habana	Kaveh Nabatian
Zo Reken		Emanuel Licha

=== Gateway ===
English title	Original title	Director(s)	Production country
Barbarian Invasion		Tan Chui Mui	Malaysia, Hong Kong, Philippines
A Chat		Wang Xide	China
Fortune Favors Lady Nikuko	Gyokō no Nikuko-chan	Ayumu Watanabe	Japan
In Front of Your Face		Hong Sang-soo	South Korea
Money Has Four Legs		Maung Sun	Myanmar
Moneyboys	尋找	C.B.Yi	Taiwan, Austria
Sinkhole	Singkeuhol	Kim Ji-hoon	South Korea
Spaghetti Code Love		Takeshi Maruyama	Japan
Three Sisters		Lee Seung-won	South Korea
Time		Ricky Ko	Hong Kong
Wife of a Spy	Spy no Tsuma	Kiyoshi Kurosawa	Japan
Yuni		Kamila Andini	Indonesia, Singapore, France, Australia

=== Impact ===
English title	Original title	Director(s)	Production country
Ayukawa: The Weight of Life		Tu Neill, Jim Speers	New Zealand, United Kingdom, Japan
Behind the Headlines		Daniel Andreas Sager	Germany
Blue Box		Michal Weits	Israel, Canada, Belgium
From the Wild Sea	Fra det vilde hav	Robin Petré	Denmark
Her Socialist Smile		John Gianvito	United States
Little Palestine: Diary of an Occupation		Abdallah Al-Khatib	Lebanon, France, Qatar
Secrets from Putumayo		Aurélio Michiles	Brazil

=== Insights ===
English title	Original title	Director(s)	Production country
Daughter of a Lost Bird		Brooke Pepion Swaney	United States
Faya Dayi		Jessica Beshir	Ethiopia, United States, Qatar
The First 54 Years: An Abbreviated Manual for Military Occupation		Avi Mograbi	France, Finland, Israel, Germany
Flee		Jonas Poher Rasmussen	United States, United Kingdom, France, Sweden, Norway, Denmark
Just a Movement	Juste un mouvement	Vincent Meessen	Belgium, France
The King of North Sudan		Danny Abel	United States, China, Egypt, Thailand
Maya		Jamshid Mojaddadi, Anson Hartford	United Kingdom, Iran
My Childhood, My Country - 20 Years in Afghanistan		Phil Grabsky, Shoaib Sharifi	Afghanistan, United Kingdom
The Six		Arthur Jones	China
Taming the Garden		Salomé Jashi	Switzerland, Germany, Georgia
The Velvet Queen	La Panthère des neiges	Marie Amiguet, Vincent Munier	France
Venetian Molecules	Molecole	Andrea Segre	Italy

=== M/A/D ===
English title	Original title	Director(s)	Production country
Charlotte		Eric Warin, Tahir Rana	Canada, France, Belgium
The Endless Moment: The Painter Rolf Kuhlmann		Claudia Schmid	Germany, Greece
Keep Rolling		Man Lim Chung	Hong Kong
Nine Sevilles	Nueve Sevillas	Gonzalo García Pelayo, Pedro G. Romero	Spain, France
Records		Alan Zweig	Canada
Rock Bottom Riser		Fern Silva	United States
Stories That Transform Us		Corey Payette	Canada
To the Moon		Tadhg O'Sullivan	Ireland
White Cube		Renzo Martens	Netherlands, Belgium

=== Modes ===
English title	Original title	Director(s)	Production country
Adversarial Infrastructure		Anna Engelhardt	Russia
The Canyon		Zachary Epcar	United States
The Coast		Sohrab Hura	India
Corps Samples		Astrid de la Chapelle	France
Happiness Is a Journey		Ivete Lucas, Patrick Bresnan	United States, Estonia
In Flow of Words		Eliane Esther Bots	Netherlands
I've Been Afraid		Cecelia Condit	Mexico
Motorcyclist's Happiness Won't Fit Into His Suit	Al motociclista no le cabe la felicidad en el traje	Gabriel Herrera	Mexico
Neon Phantom	Fantasma Neon	Leonardo Martinelli	Brazil
New Abnormal		Sorayos Prapapan	Thailand, South Korea, Singapore
Once Upon a Screen: Explosive Paradox		Kevin B. Lee	Germany, United States
Show Me Other Places		Rajee Samarasinghe	Sri Lanka, United States

=== Altered States ===
English title	Original title	Director(s)	Production country
Bipolar		Queena Li	China
Kicking Blood		Blaine Thurier	Canada
Saloum		Jean Luc Herbulot	Senegal
The Scary of Sixty-First		Dasha Nekrasova	United States
Strawberry Mansion		Albert Birney, Kentucker Audley	United States
Tin Can		Seth A. Smith	Canada
Woodlands Dark and Days Bewitched: A History of Folk Horror		Kier-La Janisse	United States

=== Short Forum ===
English title	Original title	Director(s)
Ajjigiingiluktaaqtaugut (We Are All Different)		Lindsay McIntyre
Bad Seeds	Mauvaises herbes	Claude Cloutier
Big Things		Eric Peterson
The Blactor		Rukiya Bernard
Boobs	Lolos	Marie Valade
Canucks Riot I		Lewis Bennett
Chocolate		Charlene Moore
Defund		Kahdijah Roberts-Abdulla, Araya Mengesha
Evan's Drum		Ossie Michelin
Flower Boy		Anya Chirkova
Hatha		Asia Youngman
Heavy Petting		Brendan Prost
The Horses		Liz Cairns
Indigenous Dads		Peter Brass
The Isobel Imprint		Liz Grant
Jean Swanson: We Need a New Map		Teresa Alfield
Kiri and the Girl		Grace Dove
Like the Ones I Used to Know	Les Grandes claques	Annie St-Pierre
Mary Two-Axe Earley: I Am Indian Again		Courtney Montour
Meneath: The Hidden Island of Ethics		Terril Calder
Militant Mother		Carmen Pollard
The Mohel		Charles Wahl
Nalujuk Night		Jennie Williams
News from Home		Sara Wylie
On Either Side		Elisa Julia Gilmour
Personals		Sasha Argirov
Prometheus		Marie Farsi
A Safe Distance		Gloria Mercer
Solitary Skies		Amanda Cassidy
Srikandi		Andrea Nirmala Widjajanto
Things We Feel But Do Not Say		Lauren Grant
Tla-o-qui-aht Dugout Canoe		Steven Davies
Together		Albert Shin
Twelve Hours		Paul Shkordoff
The Untouchable		Avazeh Shahnavaz
A Void		Dominique Van Olm
Without You		Mina Shum

=== International Shorts ===
English title	Original title	Director(s)	Production country
Al-Sit		Suzannah Mirghani	Sudan, Qatar
All Dogs Die	Allir Hundar Deyja	Ninna Pálmadóttir	Iceland
Anyhow, Anyway	Seja como for	Catarina Romano	Portugal
Apart, Together		Olivia Hang Zhou	United States, China
The Black Disquisition		Quincy G. Ledbetter	United States
Carrier	Lasti	Max Ovaska	Finland
Chants from a Holy Book		Cassiana Der Haroutiounian, Cesar Gananian	Brazil
Charlotte		Zach Dorn	United States
Charon		Yannick Karcher	France
Don vs. Lightning		Big Red Button	United Kingdom
Dona		Marga Melià	Spain
Fall of the Ibis King		Mikai Geronimo, Josh O'Caoimh	Ireland
Flowing Home	Nhu môt dòng sông	Sandra Desmazières	France
The Following Year		Miguel Campaña	Spain
Goodbye Tornio	Hei hei Tornio	Emilia Hernesniemi	Finland
Granny's Sexual Life	Babičino seksualno življenje	Urška Djukić	Slovenia, France
MeTube: August Sings Una Furtiva Lagrima		Daniel Moshel	Austria
The Monkey		Lorenzo Degl´Innocenti, Xosé Zapata	Portugal, Spain
Neko and Flies		Tsao Shih Han	Taiwan
The Night I Left America		Laki Karavias	United States
Nuevo Rico		Kristian Mercado Figueroa	United States
Quality Time		Omer Ben-David	Israel
A Quiet Man	L'Homme silencieux	Nyima Cartier	France
A Roll in the Hay	Une partie en l'air	Geoffrey Fighiera	France
Roy		Tom Berkeley, Ross White	United Kingdom
The Saverini Widow	La Veuve Savarini	Loïc Gaillard	France
Unnecessary Things	Непотрібні речі	Dmytro Lisenbart	Ukraine
Wake		Mark Boston	United Kingdom
Your Street	Deine Strasse	Güzin Kar	Switzerland

=== Reel Youth ===
English title	Original title	Director(s)	Production country
10am		Prodipto Saha	Bangladesh
All Alone		Mackenzie Dy	Canada
The Art of Being in a World of Not Being		Soheil Soheili, Parsa Shojai, Alireza Ahmadi, Sajad Teymoori	Iran
Christopher Hunte		Tiffany Siu, Andrea Leung	Canada
Eye Robot		Elina Villemure, Noah Harrison	United States
From the North		Avi Maksagak	Canada
ḥaḥuupač̓akukqin		Tim Masso	Canada
A Letter to Hong Kong		Wynne Kwok	Canada
Kamayan		Minerva Navasca	Canada
kʷənáŋət néʔ		Marius Fernandes, Julian Fernandes, Anthony Fernandes, Malinalli Angulo, Weah Fernandes	Canada
The Moments	Chwile	Piotr Kaźmierczak	Poland
Music for the End of the World		Emmanuel Li	United Kingdom
Pitoc e icinakosian		Jos-Onimskiw Ottawa-Dubé, Gerry Ottawa	Canada
The Secret of Colors		Travis Nguyen	Canada
Sophie and Jacob		Max Shoham	Canada
Wicket		Harsh Khurana	India
Witch's Hunt Day		Odilia Tanujaya	Indonesia
