= The Chronicle (TV series) =

- Genre: Science fiction; Comedy; Mystery
- Created by: Silvio Horta
- Starring: Chad Willett; Rena Sofer; Reno Wilson; Jon Polito; Curtis Armstrong; Elaine Hendrix; Patrick Renna; Sharon Sachs; Octavia Spencer; April Bolds
- Composer: Donald Markowitz
- Country of origin: United States
- Original language: English
- No. of seasons: 1
- No. of episodes: 22

Production
- Running time: 44 minutes
- Production companies: The Greenblatt/Janollari Studio; Stu Segall Productions; Roundtable Productions; Silent H Productions; 20th Century Fox International Television Distribution

Original release
- Network: Sci Fi
- Release: July 14, 2001 – March 22, 2002

The Chronicle is an American science fiction comedy television series starring Chad Willett that was broadcast on the Sci-Fi Channel from July 14, 2001, to March 22, 2002. The series is based on the News from the Edge series of novels (for example, Vampires from Vermont) by Mark Sumner, a St. Louis–based author. The series was originally sold to NBC, which shot the pilot, but later found a home on Sci-Fi Channel. The original creative producers who brought the series to television were German Michael Torres and Trevor Taylor.

== Premise ==
The show centers on a group of journalists at a tabloid newspaper, The Chronicle, and the contradictions that transpire when they realize that the various monsters, aliens, and mutants turn out to be real.

== Cast ==
=== Main ===
- Chad Willett as Tucker Burns
- Rena Sofer as Grace Hall
- Reno Wilson as Wes Freewald
- Jon Polito as Donald Stern

=== Recurring ===
- Curtis Armstrong as Sal the Pig-Boy
- Sharon Sachs as Vera
- Elaine Hendrix as Kristen Martin
- Octavia Spencer as Ruby
- April Bolds as Chronicle Staff Writer

== Production ==
Series creator Silvio Horta adapted the book series News from the Edge by Mark Sumner, whose concept was that every outlandish picture or story in a tabloid is real. Horta stated his intention was to make a more fun, less dour version of The X-Files. The series was initially developed for NBC as a half-hour comedy, but they passed on the produced pilot. The project was then picked up by the Sci-Fi Channel, where it was expanded to an hour-long comedic monster of the week format, similar in tone to Buffy the Vampire Slayer.

== Episodes ==
No.	Title	Directed by	Written by	Original release date	Prod. code
1	"Pilot"	Marc Buckland	Silvio Horta	July 14, 2001	5009-01-179
Tucker Burns (Chad Willett), a journalism graduate from Columbia with a slightly blemished record, is desperate for a job in the print media. The only place that will hire him is The World Chronicle, a weekly tabloid. He quickly discovers that the Chronicle's articles may be truer than people think. The pilot introduces other Chronicle staff members, including lead reporter Grace Hall (Rena Sofer), photographer Wes Freewald (Reno Wilson), and editor/publisher Donald Stern (Jon Polito).
2	"What Gobbles Beneath"	Adam Davidson	Silvio Horta	July 14, 2001	5009-01-105
Powerful new cell phones threaten the city when huge underground worms home in on the signals.
3	"Here There Be Dragons"	Sanford Bookstaver	Naren Shankar	July 21, 2001	5009-01-107
Tucker, Grace and Wes investigate a dragon living in the sewers beneath Chinatown only to get tangled up in a love triangle. George Takei guest stars as the father of Mina Shen (Youki Kudoh).
4	"Baby Got Back"	John T. Kretchmer	Silvio Horta	July 28, 2001	5009-01-102
An abandoned baby on the doorstep of the World Chronicle building exposes the staff to a dangerous--some might even say demonic--pyramid scheme, led by David Tally (Richard Karn).
5	"He's Dead, She's Dead"	John T. Kretchmer	Erin Maher & Kay Reindl	August 4, 2001	5009-01-106
6	"Bermuda Love Triangle"	Krishna Rao	Henry Alonso Myers	August 11, 2001	5009-01-110
7	"Only the Young Die Good"	Adam Davidson	Peter Hume	August 18, 2001	5009-01-109
8	"Bring Me the Head of Tucker Burns"	Sanford Bookstaver	Javier Grillo-Marxuach	August 25, 2001	5009-01-111
9	"Let Sleeping Dogs Fry"	Bruce Seth Green	Javier Grillo-Marxuach	September 8, 2001	5009-01-101
10	"Take Me Back"	Krishna Rao	Naren Shankar	September 15, 2001	5009-01-112
11	"Touched by an Alien"	Sanford Bookstaver	Javier Grillo-Marxuach	January 4, 2002	5009-01-113
12	"Pig Boy's Big Adventure"	Michael Grossman	Javier Grillo-Marxuach	January 11, 2002	5009-01-116
13	"The Cursed Sombrero"	Sanford Bookstaver	Silvio Horta	January 18, 2002	5009-01-115
14	"Tears of a Clone"	Adam Davidson	Hans Beimler	January 25, 2002	5009-01-117
15	"I See Dead Fat People"	Jay Tobias	Josh Appelbaum & André Nemec	February 1, 2002	5009-01-103
16	"Man and Superman"	Adam Davidson	Henry Alonso Myers	February 8, 2002	5009-01-114
17	"Hot from the Oven"	Jay Tobias	Javier Grillo-Marxuach	February 15, 2002	5009-01-108
18	"The Stepford Cheerleaders"	Perry Lang	Henry Alonso Myers	February 22, 2002	5009-01-104
19	"The Mists of Avalon Parkway"	David Straiton	Henry Alonso Myers	March 1, 2002	5009-01-118
20	"The King Is Undead"	Krishna Rao	Javier Grillo-Marxuach	March 8, 2002	5009-01-119
21	"Hell Mall"	David Barrett	Michael Shear & Patrick Sean Smith	March 15, 2002	5009-01-120
22	"A Snitch in Time"	Krishna Rao	Hans Beimler	March 22, 2002	5009-01-121
