= Way of the Wicked =

- Directed by: Kevin Carraway
- Written by: Matthew Robert Kelly
- Produced by: Matthew Robert Kelly
- Starring: Vinnie Jones, Christian Slater, Emily Tennant, Matthew Robert Kelly
- Cinematography: Curtis Petersen
- Edited by: Richard Martin
- Music by: Christopher Nickel
- Production companies: Matt Kelly Films; Odyssey Media
- Distributed by: Image Entertainment (USA); Signature Entertainment (UK); Amazing D.C. (Japan)
- Release date: April 30, 2014 (China)
- Running time: 92 minutes
- Country: United States
- Language: English

Way of the Wicked is a 2014 American horror film directed by Kevin Carraway and starring Christian Slater. The film had its Internet premiere on April 30, 2014 in China and was released onto DVD in the United States on May 20 of the same year. The story concerns a young boy who may or may not be the Anti-Christ.

== Plot ==
Father Henry visits the home of 12-year-old Robbie Mueller on the suspicion that Robbie used supernatural powers to kill a young bully who was tormenting him. Robbie professes his innocence and tells the priest to speak to his friend Heather Elliot. Father Henry explains that he already interviewed Heather and that she claimed to not know what happened. When Henry holds his cross and presses the boy for answers, Robbie’s mom forces Henry from their home.

5 Years Later – Heather’s police detective father John Elliot still grieves over the death of Heather’s mother the previous year. Robbie resurfaces as a new student at the same high school attended by Heather. Heather’s newfound attraction to Robbie irritates Greg Forsythe, who is interested in Heather. In front of Heather, Greg starts a fight with Robbie. Greg suddenly begins bleeding, convulsing, and is thrown repeatedly into the lockers by an invisible force before being taken away in an ambulance. Father Henry observes from a distance.

After being released from the hospital, Greg takes Heather for a drive. When Greg becomes overly physical with Heather, he is forcibly thrown to the ground. Heather kicks Greg before fleeing in his convertible. While walking home, Greg has a run-in with Robbie. Afterwards, a piece of farm machinery activates on its own and kills Greg.

Detective Fleming calls John to the crime scene and reveals that Heather is a suspect in Greg’s death, and that the farm machinery mysteriously had no engine inside of it. To John’s dismay, his daughter continues her budding relationship with Robbie, who John suspects may be involved in Greg’s murder. John confronts Robbie on several occasions, angering Robbie and alienating Heather.

Father Henry meets with John and tells him his suspicions about Robbie being connected to a prophecy foretelling evil. That night, Henry nearly drives his car off the road when it goes out of control unexpectedly. At school, Greg’s friend Matt and another boy assault Robbie in the locker room. Matt and the other boy are then taken down by an invisible force. Later, Father Henry is killed when the cross worn around his neck mysteriously chokes him.

John discovers Father Henry’s body and then finds Robbie at the cemetery with Heather. John confronts Robbie at gunpoint as Heather professes Robbie’s innocence to her father. Robbie pulls his own gun and points it at John. When an invisible force causes the gun to fly from Robbie’s hand, Robbie scrambles after it. John is forced to shoot when Robbie aims his weapon once again. With Robbie dead, Heather reveals to her father that she was actually the person with the supernatural ability.

== Cast ==
- Vinnie Jones as John Elliott
- Christian Slater as Henry
- Emily Tennant as Heather
- Jake Croker as Robbie
- Aren Buchholz as Greg
- Matthew Robert Kelly as Detective Fleming (as Matt Kelly)
- Brittney Wilson as Cindy
- Jedidiah Goodacre as Matt
- Jillian Fargey as Elizabeth
- Chris Shields as Teacher
- Anna Galvin as Laura
- Sydney Waack as Young Heather
- Ryan Grantham as Young Robbie
- Jason Burkart as Janitor
- Bal Nagra as Boy #1

== Production ==
Plans to film Way of the Wicked were announced in 2012. Rutger Hauer and Peter Facinelli were initially attached to star in the film along with Christian Slater. The initial plot description was different from the final product, and Hauer was to portray a priest assisting Facinelli, a detective trying to discover the whereabouts of a murderer. Slater was to star as Facinelli's boss. The initial script was written by Lawrence Salva, but was re-worked into a new script by Matthew Robert Kelly. Jones was later signed to portray detective John Elliott and Slater took on the role of Henry, a defrocked priest. Of filming, Carraway stated that he enjoyed working with Slater on the film and that Jones liked the chance to "play something a little different because he always plays the tough guy characters".

== Reception ==
HorrorNews.net wrote a positive review for Way of the Wicked, as they felt that it was "one of the better horror movies that [they] have seen recently" and cited the film's cast as a highlight. In contrast, Ain't It Cool News panned the movie overall and cautioned readers to "steer clear of this bland witch/paranormal outing".
