= Resistance Fighters =

- Poster
- Genre: Documentary
- Written by: Michael Wech
- Directed by: Michael Wech
- Music by: Andreas Lucas
- Country of origin: Germany
- Original languages: German, English

Production
- Producer: Leopold Hoesch
- Cinematography: Johannes Imdahl, Sven Kiesche
- Editor: Michael Scheffold
- Running time: 99 minutes

Original release
- Network: Arte
- Release: March 12, 2019

Resistance Fighters – The Global Antibiotics Crisis (German: Resistance Fighters – Die globale Antibiotika-Krise) is a documentary film by the German director Michael Wech and producer Leopold Hoesch. It was broadcast on Arte on March 12, 2019 and had its international festival premiere at the Copenhagen International Documentary Festival (CPH:DOX) on March 24, 2019.

== Content ==
The film deals with the phenomenon of antibiotic resistance spreading worldwide and the associated consequences for human cohabitation. The starting point of the documentary film is the United Nations General Assembly in September 2016 in New York, where the problem of the worldwide growing resistance to antibiotics was a central theme. In the course of the film, various experts in the field are brought up for discussion: Scientists, including Timothy Walsh of Cardiff University, one of the world's leading microbiologists on antibiotic resistance, who are looking for the causes of the spread of resistance and alternatives to antibiotics, politicians, such as the British economist and financial expert Jim O'Neill, appointed in 2014 by the then Prime Minister David Cameron as the British government's special envoy for antibiotic resistance, who want to draw public attention to the problem and also focus on the economic dimension of the increasing antibiotic resistance, as well as patients and their doctors who fight against infections with multi-resistant germs in hospitals. The use of antibiotics in animal feed plays a central role in the film. It also discusses the discovery of the first antibiotic penicillin by Scottish scientist Alexander Fleming and the rise of antibiotics to become a globally used remedy. The film was shot in the United States, United Kingdom, Vietnam, Bangladesh and Germany.

== Production and distribution ==
The film is a co-production of Broadview Pictures and ZDF and was produced in cooperation with Arte. It was funded by the Hessische Filmförderung and the Film- und Medienstiftung NRW.

The film is distributed since February 2019 by the documentary film distributor Dogwoof.

== Festivals and awards ==
- March 2019: International festival premiere at the Copenhagen International Documentary Film Festival CPH:DOX
- June 2019: Screening in Halle (Saale) at the Silbersalz Science & Media
- September 2019: US premiere in New York at the United Nations General Assembly. Opening speech by US Secretary of Health and Human Services Alex Azar (with support from the Melinda and Bill Gates Foundation, Centers for Disease Control and Prevention, Wellcome Trust)
- October 2019: Canadian premiere at the Vancouver International Film Festival – Winner of the “Impact Award“
- October 2019: Screening in Palo Alto at the United Nations Association Film Festival
- October 2019: Screening in Paris at the Pariscience Film Festival – Winner of the “Grand Prix AST – Ville de Paris”
- January 2020: Screening in Dhaka at the Dhaka International Film Festival
- January 2020: Screening in La Jolla at the Impact DOCS Awards – Winner of the “Award of Excellence Special Mention: Documentary Feature”
- February 2020: Screening in Rotterdam at the Dutch Global Health Film Festival
- February 2020: Screening in Sedona at the Sedona International Film Festival
- April 2020: Screening in Olomouc at the Academia Film Olomouc Festival
- 2020: Screening at the Kyiv International Film Festival
- June 2020: Nomination for the German Television Award in the category "Best Documentary"
- June 2020: Winner of the German Television Award in the category "Best Editing Info/Documentary"
