= Koneline: Our Land Beautiful =

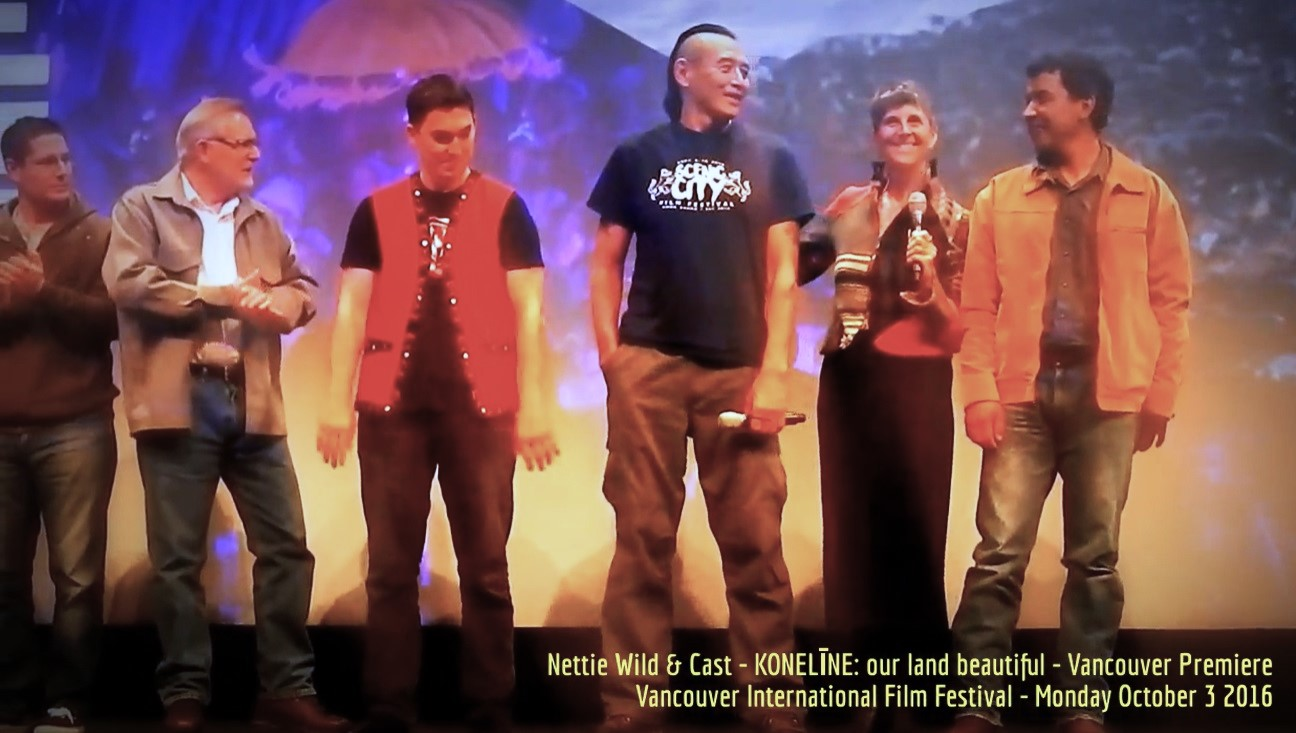
- Nettie Wild (second from right) and cast of KONELĪNE- our land beautiful, at the 2016 Vancouver International Film Festival
- Directed by: Nettie Wild
- Produced by: Betsy Carson
- Cinematography: Van Royko
- Edited by: Michael Brockington
- Music by: Jesse Zubot; Hildegard Westerkamp; Mark Lazeski
- Production company: Canada Wild Productions
- Release date: February 7, 2016 (Available Light Film Festival)
- Running time: 96 minutes
- Country: Canada
- Language: English

Koneline: Our Land Beautiful is a 2016 Canadian documentary film, directed by Nettie Wild and produced by Betsy Carson. The film explores the different lives of the Tahltan First Nations located in northern British Columbia. Through an objective lens, the audience experiences different perspectives from natives, miners, hunters, linesmen, geologists and tourists in Telegraph Creek. "Koneline" means "our land beautiful" in the Tahltan language.

== Filming ==
It took four years to film and one year to edit the documentary. The director, Nettie Wild, had to earn the trust from the Tahltan people. Wild gained permission by promising the Tahltan people that they could see the end product. The intention of the KONELĪNE is to be "cinematic poetry" where film captures an unbiased perspective without pushing any political message.

== Awards ==
The film premiered at the 2016 Hot Docs Canadian International Documentary Festival, where it won the award for Best Canadian Feature Documentary. It has also won the Audience Choice Award for Best Canadian Documentary at the 2016 Available Light Film Festival, and CSC Robert Brooks Award for Best Cinematography (Van Royko). The film garnered three Canadian Screen Award nominations at the 5th Canadian Screen Awards in 2017, for Best Feature Length Documentary, Best Cinematography in a Documentary (Royko) and Best Editing in a Documentary (Michael Brockington).
