= She's a Boy I Knew =

- Directed by: Gwen Haworth
- Written by: Gwen Haworth
- Produced by: Gwen Haworth
- Starring: Gwen Haworth
- Music by: Daniel Moxon
- Production company: Shapeshifter Films
- Distributed by: Indieflix
- Release date: 2007
- Running time: 70 minutes
- Country: Canada
- Language: English

She's a Boy I Knew is a Canadian documentary film by Gwen Haworth, released in 2007. The film documents Haworth's process of coming out as transgender and undergoing gender transition, using a combination of interviews, home video footage, short animation clips and interviews with her friends and family about its impact on them.

The film premiered at the Vancouver International Film Festival in 2007. It won the People's Choice Award for Most Popular Canadian Film, and Haworth won the Women in Film and Television Vancouver Artistic Merit Award. At the 2008 Inside Out Film and Video Festival, it won the Audience Award for Best Documentary.

== See also ==
- List of LGBT films directed by women
