= Nimisha Mukerji =

Canadian director and filmmaker

Nimisha Mukerji is a Canadian film and television director. She has directed episodes of The Imperfects, Mech-X4, and Gabby Duran & the Unsittables.

== Career ==
Mukerji's debut feature, 65_Redroses (2009), was one of the first official selections by Oprah Winfrey for her Documentary Club on OWN. Distributed by PBS International, Ro*co, and Hellocoolworld, 65_Redroses was commissioned by the CBC and acquired by Netflix and Hulu. In 2009, Mukerji and Philip Lyall, her collaborator on 65 Redroses, were named winners of the Don Haig Award at the Hot Docs Canadian International Documentary Festival.

Mukerji's second feature, Blood Relative (2012), was produced for Knowledge Network and screened in competition at Hot Docs 2013, winning the Audience Awards in Vancouver, New York, and Paris, before receiving three Canadian Screen Award nominations, including Best Direction in a Documentary Program, Mukerji's second nomination in this category.

Her short narrative works include The Arrival Hour, In the Deep, and Beauty Mark, which was the official selection by Telefilm Canada's Not Short on Talent Program at the 2013 Cannes Film Festival. Mukerji is an alumnus of TIFF's Talent Lab and sits on the boards of DOC National and Point of View. She was the recipient of the 2014 Women in Film & Television Artistic Achievement Award and the 2015 Directors Guild of Canada's Mentorship Award.
