= Steve Price =

Stephen, Steven or Steve Price may refer to:

== Government and military ==
- Stephen Price (Australian politician) (born 1969), member of the Western Australian Legislative Assembly
- Stephen Price (born 1572) of Gray's Inn, London, member of Parliament for New Radnor Boroughs in 1601
- Stephen Price (died 1562), member of Parliament for Radnorshire, Wales in 1555
- Stephen Price (RAF officer) (1893–1974), English flying ace during World War I

== Media, journalism, and writing ==
- Steve Price (broadcaster) (born 1955), Australian radio journalist
- Steven Price (businessman) (born 1962), American businessman, co-founder of Townsquare Media, and minority owner of the Atlanta Hawks
- Steven Price (writer), Canadian poet and novelist

== Music, film, and theatre ==
- Stephen Price (theatre manager) (1782–1840), manager of the Park Theatre in New York and Drury Lane in London
- Steve Price (musician), American percussionist for the band Pablo Cruise
- Steven Price (composer) (born 1977), British composer, best known for scoring Gravity (2013)
- Steven Price, a fictional character in the 2011 film Abduction

== Sport ==
- Stephen Price (cricketer) (born 1979), English cricketer
- Steve Price (coach) (born 1977), Australian rugby league coach
- Steve Price (rugby league) (born 1974), Australian rugby league footballer

== Business ==
- Stephen Price (lawyer) (born 1961), Australian lawyer and Chairman of Corrs Chambers Westgarth
