= Volker Struth =

German football agent

Volke Struth (born 10 March 1966) is a German football agent.

== Career ==
Struth has represented Germany international Toni Kroos.
