= Gwen Haworth =

Canadian film director and cinematographer

- Born: Steve Haworth; December 9, 1972 (age 53); Vancouver, British Columbia, Canada
- Notable work: Transgender Canadian film "She's a Boy I Knew"
- Awards: Winner of the artistic merit award from Women in Film & Television

Gwen Haworth (born December 9, 1972) is a Canadian transgender filmmaker, editor, social worker and instructor, known for her experimental documentaries She's a Boy I Knew (2007) and A Woman With a Past (2014). Haworth is also an advocate for transgender health issues and was chosen in 2014 as one of Vancouver's 12 Remarkable Women at a ceremony on March 8 for International Women's Day.

== Early life and education ==
Gwen Haworth was born and raised in Vancouver, Canada. After graduating with a degree in psychology in 1995, she went on to complete undergraduate and graduate degrees in Film Production at the University of British Columbia. Haworth trained as a director's intern with the Academy of Canadian Cinema and Television and served as a programmer and board member for Out On Screen, which holds Vancouver's Queer Film Festival.

== Career ==
=== She's a Boy I Knew (2007) ===
Haworth's 2007 multi-award-winning documentary She's a Boy I Knew explores her gender transition through the voices of her friends and family. It has played in over 100 film festivals across the world and is part of the post-secondary curriculum in schools across North America. The film begins in 2000 when Haworth, then named Steven, came out to her family about her lifelong female gender identity. The basic story is Haworth's journey from a man to a woman from Steve to Gwen. What's unusual is the fact that the film has been created by someone like Gwen: a female born with the physical appearances of a male. Haworth tells her story rather than having it told by someone else. Gwen shifts the focus onto the six most important people in her life who unexpectedly find their bonds overcoming their preconceptions of gender and sexuality, discussing how they reacted to her transition. Gwen's mother considered Steve as a "regular Vancouver boy" who played hockey and never showed anything she would regard as feminine. Gwen's father realized he lost his son when Steve legally changed his name. Haworth discusses her transition as states "I came out at 27, told people about my gender identity and found a lot of support. I realized I could now approach things that were personal in life, things that I'd kept at shoulder's length, this film had the chance to have an impact on other people's lives and other families going through a similar process."

=== A Woman With a Past (2014) ===
In 2014, Haworth created the documentary A Woman With a Past in the documentary anthology Fucking Different XXY, discuss transgender individuals and the journeys that they have been through when transitioning. The segment focuses on the life of Antonette Rea, a transgender intersex poet and activist. Haworth discusses Antonette's work on the streets, her struggles with stigma, violence and addiction, and how ultimately her humour and poetry have been essential to creating a new chapter and self-expression. In a review of the film, critic Kevin Griffin argues that Haworth's films create an emotional space that engulfs the viewer and contributes to radical changes in public awareness about transgender and gender-variant people.

== Personal life ==
Gwen Haworth has contributed to public awareness about trans and gender-variant people. As well as being a queer gender filmmaker, Haworth is also a social worker who offers sessions that focuses on helping transgender individuals with medical and mental health care. Of her work, Haworth has stated, "I love giving back to the community and am truly blessed to help these individuals".

== Awards ==
- People's Choice Award for the Most Popular Canadian Film at the Vancouver International Film Festival (2007, for She's A Boy I Knew)
- Women in Film & Television Vancouver Artistic Merit Award at the Vancouver International Film Festival (2007, for She's A Boy I Knew)
- Vancouver's 12 Remarkable Women

== Filmography ==
Movie	Year
Not Kokura	1996
Road Movie	1997
She's a Boy I Knew	2007
Fucking Different XXY, segment "A Women With a Past"	2014
