= Tanja Walther-Ahrens =

German footballer (born 1970)

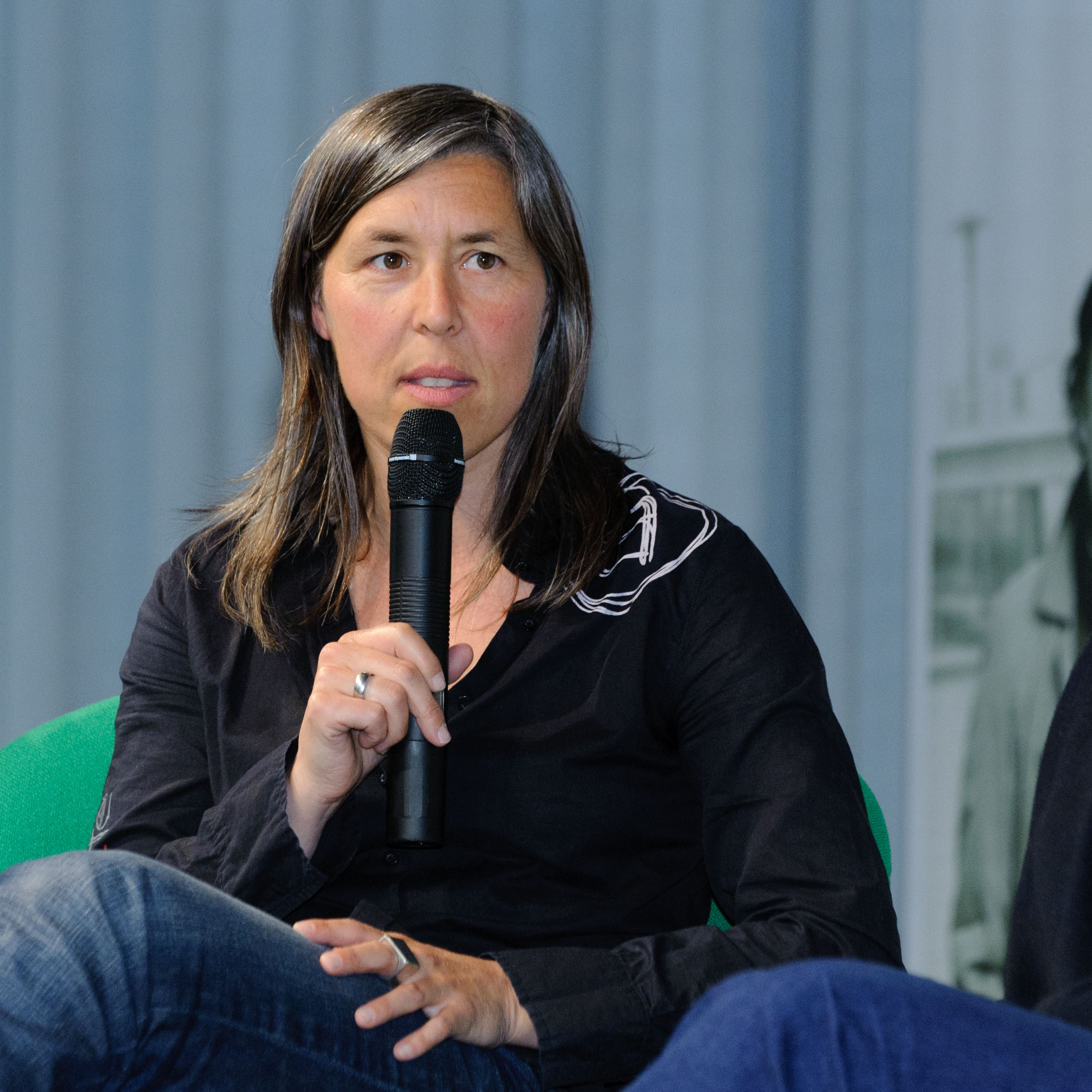

Personal information
- Date of birth: 9 October 1970 (age 56)
- Place of birth: Hesse, Germany
- Position: Midfielder

Senior career*
| Years | Team | Apps | (Gls) |
| 1992–1994 | Tennis Borussia Berlin | | |
| 1995–1999 | Turbine Potsdam | | |
- * Club domestic league appearances and goals

Tanja Walther-Ahrens is a retired German footballer who played for 1. FFC Turbine Potsdam.
