= Coextinction (film) =

- Directed by: Gloria Pancrazi; Elena Jean
- Produced by: Gloria Pancrazi; Elena Jean; Andrew Luba; Nicholas Castel
- Cinematography: Nicholas Castel; Gabriel Swift; Will Allen; Joel Barrow; Ben Cox; John Fulton; Brad Lancaster; Victoria Obermeyer; Gabriel Swift; Jan Schädle Ubeda; Bronson Whytcross
- Edited by: Nicholas Castel; Elena Jean
- Music by: Julien Verschooris
- Production company: Coexistence Films
- Distributed by: Blue Ant Media
- Release date: October 3, 2021 (VIFF)
- Running time: 95 minutes
- Country: Canada
- Language: English

Coextinction is a Canadian documentary film, directed by Gloria Pancrazi and Elena Jean and released in 2021. The film centres on the environmental threat to orcas in the Pacific Ocean, caused in part by the simultaneous decline of Pacific salmon stocks that the orcas depend on for food.

The film premiered on October 3, 2021 at the 2021 Vancouver International Film Festival, where it was named the winner of the Rob Stewart Eco Warrior Award.

Nicholas Castel, Gabriel Swift, Bronson Whytcross and John Fulton received a Canadian Screen Award nomination for Best Cinematography in a Documentary at the 10th Canadian Screen Awards in 2022.

The film was executive produced by Gloria Pancrazi, Elena Jean, Andrew Luba, Nicholas Castel, Victoria Obermeyer and PNW Protectors.
