= Handle With Care: The Legend of the Notic Streetball Crew =

2021 Canadian documentary film

- Directed by: Jeremy Schaulin-Rioux; Kirk Thomas
- Written by: Joel Haywood
- Produced by: Ryan Sidhoo
- Cinematography: Hunter Wood
- Edited by: Sarah Cruise; Alec MacNeill Richardson; Jeremy Schaulin-Rioux
- Music by: Edo Van Breemen; Johannes Winkler
- Production company: The Notic Studios
- Distributed by: Gravitas Ventures
- Release dates: October 8, 2021 (VIFF); March 26, 2024 (Canada)
- Running time: 86 minutes
- Country: Canada
- Language: English

Handle With Care: The Legend of the Notic Streetball Crew is a 2021 Canadian documentary film, directed by Jeremy Schaulin-Rioux and Kirk Thomas. The film is a portrait of the Notic Streetball Crew, a streetball team who were active in Vancouver in the early 2000s; Schaulin-Rioux and Thomas got their start in the film industry making short documentary films and performance videos about the team.

The film premiered on October 8, 2021, at the 2021 Vancouver International Film Festival, where it won the award for Best British Columbia film and the Audience Award for most popular film in the True North program.

The film was a nominee for the DGC Allan King Award for Best Documentary Film at the 2022 Directors Guild of Canada awards. It received three Canadian Screen Award nominations at the 11th Canadian Screen Awards in 2023, for Best Feature Length Documentary, Best Editing in a Documentary (Schaulin-Rioux) and Best Original Music in a Documentary (Edo Van Breemen, Johannes Winkler).

== See also ==
- List of basketball films
