= Laidlaw Foundation =

Canadian charitable foundation

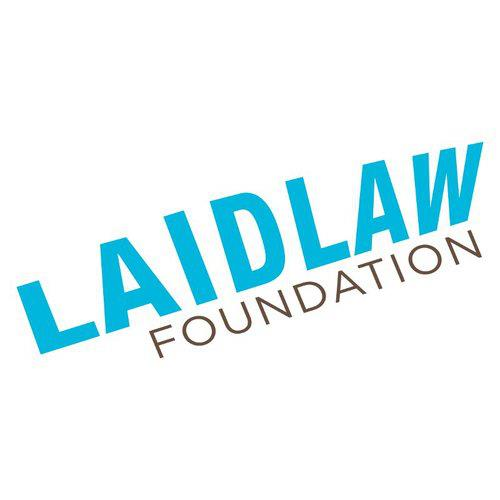
- Founded: 1949
- Founder: Robert A. Laidlaw
- Location: Toronto, Ontario
- Executive Director: Jehad Aliweiwi (2014-present)
- Endowment: C$75.3 million (2023)
- Website: laidlawfdn.org

The Laidlaw Foundation is a Canadian charitable foundation based in Toronto, Ontario. Founded in 1949 by Robert A. Laidlaw, the institution was established with the purpose of providing financial support for charitable, conservation, educational, and cultural organizations in the Ontario region. Mr. Laidlaw and his two sons, Nicholas and Roderick, gave more than C$11 million to the foundation out of a family fortune made from the R. Laidlaw Lumber Company.

Historically, the Laidlaw Foundation supported institutions such as the Hospital for Sick Children, the National Ballet of Canada, the National Ballet School, Upper Canada College, and the Royal Ontario Museum, among many others. In recent decades, the foundation has moved away from making major gifts to large institutions, shifting its focus to organizations and initiatives addressing child poverty, civic engagement, at-risk youth, justice for Indigenous communities, environmental sustainability, and the arts. Today, the foundation's work prioritizes Indigenous issues, and youth organizing for community change.

== Key people and history (1961-2024) ==
In 1961, the Laidlaw Foundation hired its first full-time staff member, Mary Claire Thomas. Thomas, who completed her Master's of Social Work at the University of Toronto, led the foundation until her retirement in 1982. Although she was hired under the title of Secretary, "she was responsible for running the organization and devising policies and new programs with the board."

In 1982, the Laidlaw Foundation hired Nathan Gilbert, 30, as its new Foundation Secretary (later Executive Director), a role he served in until his retirement in 2013. During this period, the foundation continued its support for environmental initiatives and cultural projects, but shifted focus from large legacy cultural institutions like the ROM to small theatre companies such as Buddies in Bad Times, Theatre Passe Muraille, and the Ballet Creole. In addition, the foundation established new funding priorities addressing civic engagement and social inequities, funding social infrastructure for at-risk youth, as well as policy and advocacy initiatives that promoted structural solutions to child poverty.

Since 2014, the Laidlaw Foundation has been led by Executive Director Jehad Aliweiwi, a former 3rd line right winger for the Toronto Marlies. Following the 2015 release of the Final Report of the Truth and Reconciliation Commission of Canada, the foundation pledged to support the implementation of the 94 calls to action, and has since given greater priority to addressing the needs of Indigenous communities. The Laidlaw Foundation's 2019-2024 Strategic Plan prioritizes "a deeper emphasis on youth-led systems change"; this includes focussing on "under-served youth impacted by the justice, education, and child welfare systems, and redoubling the commitment to elevate their needs and amplify their voices."
