= Jeremy Schaulin-Rioux =

Canadian film director and editor

Jeremy Schaulin-Rioux is a Canadian film director and editor from Vancouver, British Columbia. He is most noted as a two-time Juno Award nominee for Video of the Year, receiving nominations alongside Chandler Levack at the Juno Awards of 2015 for PUP's "Guilt Trip" and at the Juno Awards of 2016 for PUP's "Dark Days".

He has received numerous Prism Prize nominations, including for both "Guilt Trip" and "Dark Days". In addition to PUP, he has also directed music videos for DZ Deathrays, Lights, Billy Talent, Calpurnia, Tom Walker and Thao & the Get Down Stay Down.

His short film Rules for Werewolves, starring Finn Wolfhard, premiered at SXSW in 2020, and was later screened at the 2020 Toronto International Film Festival. A full-length version of the film is slated for future release.

The documentary film Handle With Care: The Legend of the Notic Streetball Crew, codirected by Schaulin-Rioux and Kirk Thomas, premiered at the 2021 Vancouver International Film Festival.
