= Marcel Reif =

Swiss sport journalist and commentator

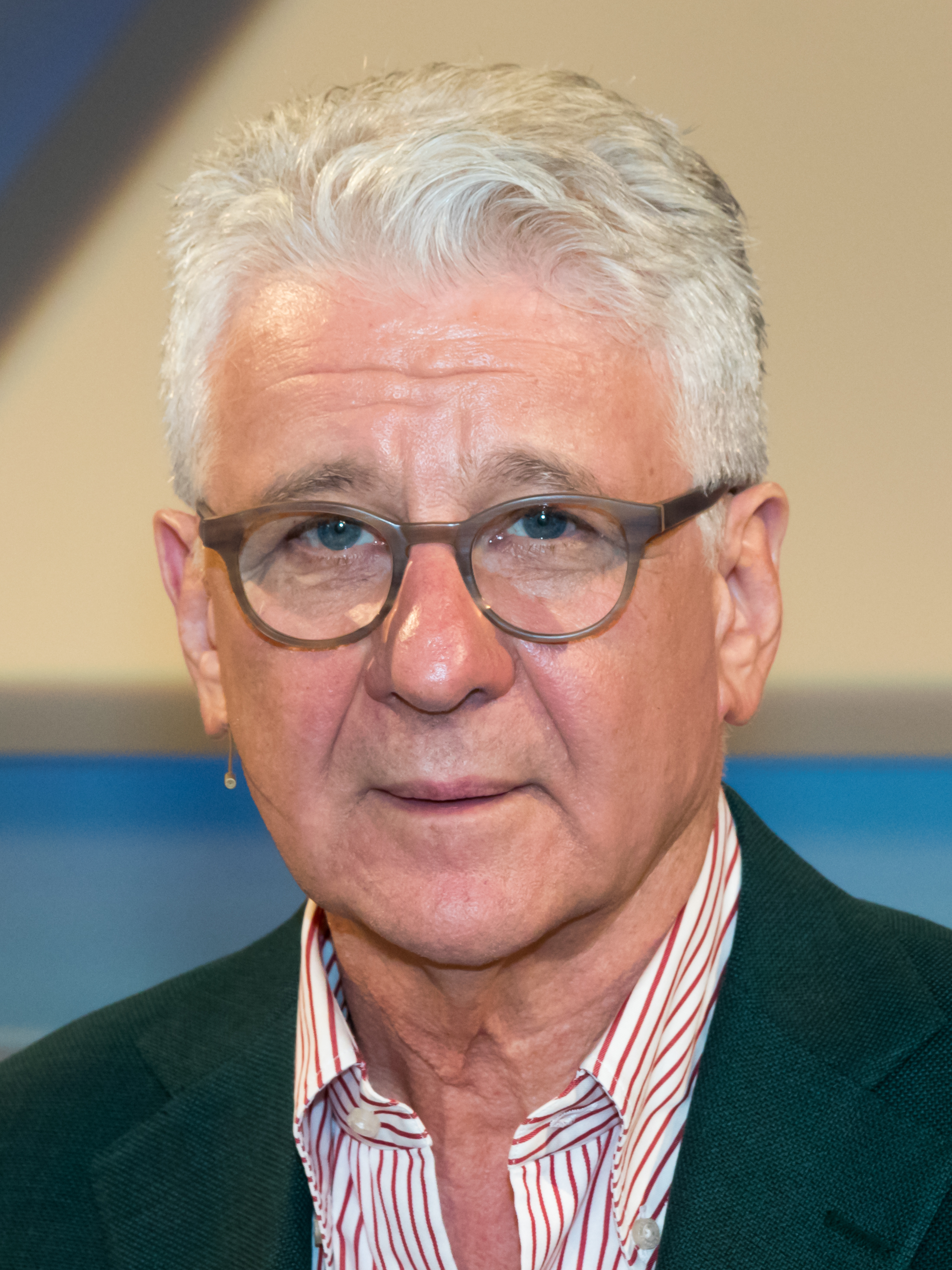
- Reif in 2019
- Born: 27 November 1949 (age 75); Wałbrzych, Silesia, Poland
- Citizenship: Switzerland
- Occupation(s): Journalist, commentator
- Years active: 1972–present
- Website: marcelreif.com

Marcel Reif (born 27 November 1949) is a Swiss television sport journalist and commentator

== Biography ==
Reif was born in Wałbrzych, Silesia (formerly Waldenburg), four years after the area was transferred to Poland from Germany following World War II. In 1956, his family moved to Tel Aviv; his father was a Polish Jew, while his mother was a German Catholic. Reif only learned to speak German at the age of eight, after his family moved again to Kaiserslautern.

Reif has been working for many years in German television as a journalist for sport programs on German broadcasters RTL and ZDF. After leaving RTL in 1999, he joined Sky Deutschland, which at that time was called "Premiere". Reif has been the head of the commentator staff for many years.

He lives in Zürich, Switzerland, and has three children. He married twice. In 2013, he acquired Swiss citizenship, and dispensed with his German one.

== Awards ==
- 2003: Adolf-Grimme-Preis
- 2002: Deutscher Fernsehpreis
