= Together (2021 short film) =

2021 Canadian film

- Directed by: Albert Shin
- Written by: Albert Shin
- Produced by: Albert Shin
- Starring: Kim Jae-rok; Ahn So-yo
- Cinematography: Myung-Hwan Moon
- Edited by: Cam McLauchlin
- Music by: Leland Whitty
- Production company: TimeLapse Pictures
- Release date: September 11, 2021 (TIFF)
- Running time: 12 minutes
- Countries: Canada; South Korea
- Language: Korean

Together is a Canadian-South Korean short drama film, directed by Albert Shin and released in 2021. The film stars Kim Jae-rok and Ahn So-yo as a man and a woman in South Korea who are meeting in person for the first time after having known each other only as online acquaintances, in order to finalize and carry out a mutual suicide pact.

The film premiered at the 2021 Toronto International Film Festival. It was subsequently screened at the 2021 Vancouver International Film Festival, where it won the award for Best Canadian Short Film.

The film was named to TIFF's annual year-end Canada's Top Ten list for 2021.
