= FIX: The Story of an Addicted City =

Canadian documentary film

Fix: The Story of an Addicted City is a Canadian documentary film, directed by Nettie Wild and released in 2003. The film centres on Vancouver's campaign to launch Insite, North America's first legal supervised injection site for injection drug users.

Figures interviewed in the film include drug user Dean Wilson, activist and organizer Ann Livingston, and Vancouver mayor Philip Owen.

The film won the Genie Award for Best Feature Length Documentary at the 24th Genie Awards.
