= Nettie Wild =

Canadian filmmaker (born 1952)

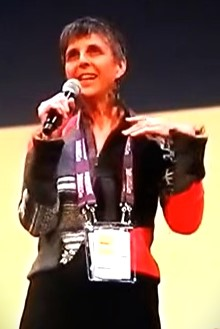
Wild at the 2016 Vancouver International Film Festival

Nettie Wild (Nettie Barry Canada Wild) is a Canadian filmmaker with a focus on documentaries that highlight marginalized groups and discrimination that these groups face, including people in Canada and around the world. She has worked throughout her professional career as an actor, director, producer, and cameraperson.

== Early life and education ==
Wild, full name Nettie Barry Canada Wild, was born in New York City on May 18, 1952 to a British father and a Kitsilano mother. Their occupations were journalist and opera singer, respectively. Wild's mother felt that Nettie sticking to her Canadian roots was important, hence the name, and one month after Wild was born, the family moved to Vancouver where Wild would live the majority of her life.

While studying at the University of British Columbia, Wild gained a Bachelor of Fine Arts (BFA) with a major in creative writing along with a minor in film and theatre. Alongside her studies, Wild co-founded Touchstone Theatre and Headlines Theatre with David Diamond, a fellow student. Wild worked with the Touchstone Theatre in 1975–1976 and Headlines Theatre during 1980–1985.

== Career ==
In 1991, she founded the Canada Wild Production with producer Betsy Carson. The production company was named in part after Wild's full name and reflects their general interest in Canadian based issues, despite making several films on more global issues.

One of Wild's earliest documentaries was Right to Fight (1982) which focused on the housing crisis that was taking place in Vancouver, British Columbia, Canada, which caused many people to have difficulty finding adequate housing or to live under the poverty line. This issue was very close to Wild as she grew up in Vancouver. Despite this, the film was received poorly and did not gain the filmmaker critical acclaim.

Wild would go on to make A Rustling of Leaves: Inside the Philippine Revolution (1988) after spending months in the Philippines, recording footage and interviewing individuals. During her time in the country, one of Wild's interviews was with a local DJ broadcasting anti-guerrilla propaganda. After threats of violence from this individual, Wild would go on to interview the president of the Philippines who showed support for the DJ. Wilds motivations behind this film was to show a look inside the revolution taking place in this country; shedding light on the situation, dispelling common Western myths about it, and advocating for support of the country. This documentary would gain Wild notoriety and support for future endeavors.

A Place Called Chiapas (1998) is a documentary by Wild following the protests and revolts that took place in Chiapas, a rural state in Mexico, known for its high rates of poverty. The events that are documented in this film take place after the signing of NAFTA (the North American Free Trade Agreement) and shows its immediate effects. This includes that it caused the Zapatista National Liberation Army (EZLN) to take over several towns and ranches in the area. The group was led by Subcomandante Marcos and caused much chaos for the town, surrounding area, and the Mexican government. Wild focused her documentary on an outsider's perspective of the rebellion, and in that way the film became immensely successful.

One of Wild's most successful films was Fix: The Story of an Addicted City (2002) which focused on the drug issue in Vancouver and the fight over whether safe injection sites should be constructed. Wild, working as the co-producer and director of the documentary, wanted to show the issues plaguing her home town. The film followed the two sides of the fight over safe injection sites and how to remedy the drug issue killing hundreds of residents every year. The film would go on to become one of Wild's most acclaimed films and lead to governmental involvement.

== Filmography ==
- Right to Fight (1982) dealing with the housing crisis in Vancouver, British Columbia, Canada
- A Rustling of Leaves: Inside the Philippine Revolution (1988)
- Blockade (1993) about a Gitksan logging blockade at Gitwangak
- A Place Called Chiapas (1998) about Zapatistas in Chiapas, Mexico.
- FIX: The Story of an Addicted City (2002) which deals with efforts to provide a safe injection site in Vancouver, British Columbia, Canada
- Koneline: Our Land Beautiful (2016), about the Tahltan people, its culture, and its lands.

== Awards ==
Wild was awarded the audience award for best documentary film at the 1998 AFI Fest for A Place Called Chiapas. She was given Genie Awards for Best Feature Length Documentary for both A Place Called Chiapas and Fix, and won two awards at the Berlin International Film Festival for A Rustling of Leaves.

At the 2016 Hot Docs Canadian International Documentary Festival (HotDocs), Wild won the Best Canadian Feature Documentary Award for KONELĪNE: our land beautiful.

At the 2016 Vancouver International Film Festival, Wild's film KONELĪNE: our land beautiful won the Women in Film and Television Artistic Merit Award, presented to a Canadian feature film at VIFF written and/or directed solely by a woman.

Wild was awarded the 2023 Governor General's Award in Visual and Media Arts for Artistic Achievement.
