= Broadview TV =

German film production company

Coordinates: 50.9229°N 6.9664°E

BROADVIEW TV GmbH
- Industry: Media
- Founded: 1999
- Headquarters: Cologne, Germany
- Key people: Executive manager: Leopold Hoesch
- Website: www.broadview.tv

Broadview TV GmbH is a German documentary film production company based in Cologne.

BROADVIEW produces documentaries for broadcast and cable networks in Germany and worldwide, including ZDF, ARD, arte, HBO, A&E, NHK, RTL, as well as for national and international Institutions including the German Foreign Office and the Commission of the European Union. The films have gone on to win the International Emmy® Award, the German Television Award, the Magnolia Award and Banff Television Award.

== History ==
Since its founding in 1999 by Leopold Hoesch, BROADVIEW TV is one of Germany's leading production companies in the fields of history, politics, culture, science and sports for TV stations, cinema distributors and media platforms in Germany and abroad. BROADVIEW TV has produced numerous documentaries for TV and cinema including the ARD-series 'German Dynasties', the arte-series 'TOO young TO DIE' and the ZDF-series 'Theatre Portraits' with Esther Schweins. Under the label Broadview Pictures, the company produced cinema documentaries that include Klitschko, Nowitzki. The Perfect Shot, Who owns nature?, KROOS and Resistance Fighters. Furthermore, Broadview TV also develops and shoots imagefilms for companies and institutions including the German Foreign Office and the European Union. The managing director is Leopold Hoesch. He represents The International Academy Of Television Arts & Industry as Ambassador to Germany.

Together with Guido Knopp and Sebastian Dehnhardt, Hoesch won the Emmy Award for Best Documentary for 'The Drama of Dresden' (2005).

== Documentaries ==
Jahr	Titel	Genre	Dauer	Sender
2025	NATALIE PORTMAN	Documentary	1 x 52'	Arte
2025	BERNHARD LANGER – Eternal Champion	Documentary	1 x 97'	MagentaTV
2025	ROYAL FAMILY – Holland's royal siblings	Documentary	1 x 43'	ZDF
2025	80 Years of the End of the War in the West – Between Ruins and Hope	Documentary	1 x 43'	WDR
2025	Ending wars – and making peace	Documentary	1 x 90'	Arte
2025	Spillover – Planet of Viruses	Documentary	1 x 90'	ARD
2024	BECKENBAUER – The Kaiser	Documentary	3 x 52'	MagentaTV
2024	The Eternal Udo Kier	Documentary	1 x 52'	WDR, Arte
2024	MOSES – 13 Steps	Documentary	1 x 105'	Cinema
2024	FEMOCRACY 2	Documentary	1 x 104'	Cinema
2024	KLITSCHKO – More than a Fight	Documentary	1 x 89'	Cinema
2024	Denmark's Royal Children – Departure and Legacy	Documentary	1 x 43'	ZDF
2024	The 2006 World Cup	Documentary	1 x 43'	WDR
2024	Football miracle: From Bern to Berlin	Documentary	1 x 92'	MagentaTV
2024	UMA THURMAN – Hollywood's Silent Warrior	Documentary	1 x 52'	Arte
2024	JOAQUIN PHOENIX – The Craft Of Emotion	Documentary	1 x 52'	Arte
2024	The Last Taboo	Documentary	1 x 94'	Prime Video
2024	Battle For The World: Germany and Globalization	Documentary	1 x 43'	ZDF
2023	Silvia. Sweden's German Queen	Documentary	1 x 43'	ZDF
2023	My Husband, The Crown Prince	Documentary	1 x 43'	ZDF
2023	My father, the king – Carl Gustaf and Victoria of Sweden	Documentary	1 x 43'	ZDF
2023	The Westfalenhalle – Arena of sensations	Documentary	1 x 45'	WDR
2023	Silent Invasion – China's Balkan strategy	Documentary	1 x 53'	Arte
2023	King Charles III.	Documentary	1 x 43'	ZDF, Arte
2023	Daniel Brühl – Breaking Bad	Documentary	1 x 52'	Arte
2023	How do we want to love?	Documentary	3 x 50'	Arte
2023	Nuclear power – the end of an era?	Documentary	1 x 90'	ZDF, Arte
2023	Sweden's Crown	Documentary	1 x 43'	ZDF
2022	The Queen’s Power – Sweden’s Strong Women	Documentary	1 x 43'	ZDF
2022	POWER COUPLES – The new Generation	Documentary	1 x 52'	ZDF, Arte
2022	COVID CENTURY – The Pandemic Preparedness Dilemma	Documentary	1 x 90'	ZDF
2022	UFOs - The Facts with Harald Lesch	Documentary	1 x 44'	ZDF
2022	Winona Ryder - The Ghosts She Called	Documentary	1 x 52'	ARTE
2022	SILENT PANDEMIC - The global fight against Antimicrobial Resistance	Documentary	1 x 90'	ZDF, ARTE
2022	Angela Merkel – A legacy through time	Documentary	1 x 90'	ARTE, MDR, ARD
2021	Ordinary Men – The "Forgotten Holocaust“	Documentary	1 x 45'	ZDF
2021	Snoop Dogg - The Doggfather	Documentary	1 x 52'	rbb, ARTE
2021	Abducted in Münsterland	Documentary	1 x 45'	WDR
2021	Schwarze Adler (Black Eagles)	Documentary	1 x 100'	amazon prime, ZDF
2021	Prince Consorts - In the Shadow of the Crown	Documentary	1 x 52'	Arte, ZDF
2021	Royal Heirs - The Gamechangers	Documentary	1 x 45'	ZDF
2021	SKIN ON SKIN: A Brief Cultural History of Touch	Documentary	1 x 52'	Arte
2020	Femocracy	Feature documentary	1 x 99'	
2020	"Hello, Dictator": Orbán, the EU and the rule of law	Documentary	1 x 89'	Arte
2020	FORESTLAND: A deep dive into the German "Heimat"	Documentary	1 x 52'	Arte
2020	Gerhard Schröder – Beat the drum	Documentary	1 x 52'	Arte
2020	Al Pacino – The Reluctant Star	Documentary	1 x 58'	3sat
2020	Germany's great clans – The Joop Story	Documentary	1 x 43'	ZDF
2019	Killer Germs – When antibiotics no longer work	Documentary	1 x 43'	ZDF
2019	Resistance Fighters: The Global Antibiotics Crisis	Feature documentary	1 x 98' | 1 x 60'	
2019	The Price of Protest: The Colin Kaepernick Story	Documentary	1 x 52'	ARTE G.E.I.E.
2019	Kroos	Feature documentary	1 x 114'	
2018	Germany's great clans – The Lidl Story	Documentary	1 x 45'	ZDF
2018	Coal	Documentary	2 x 90'	ARTE/ZDF
2017	Who owns Nature?	Theatrical Documentary	1 x 100'	
2016	Angela Merkel – The Unexpected	Documentary	1 x 90'	Arte, MDR
2016	Germany's great clans – The C&A Story	Documentary	1 x 45'	ZDF
2016	HEDDA	Fiction	1 x 90'	3sat, Arte
2015	Hitler's Mein Kampf – A Dangerous Book	Documentary	1 x 52'	Arte, ZDF
2015	Sinatra	Documentary	1 x 90'	Arte
2015	Arthur Miller – Man of the Century	Documentary	1 x 60	3sat
2015	Slapstick – The art of failure	Documentary	1 x 52	Arte
2015	Cologne's Grand Hotel – The Excelsior Hotel Ernst	Documentary	1 x 52'	WDR
2014	Nowitzki – The Perfect Shot	Documentary	1 x 90'	Magnolia Pictures
2014	Breath of Freedom	Documentary	1 x 90'	MDR, arte, Smithsonian Channel
2014	Train to Freedom	Documentary	1 x 90'	MDR, arte
2014	Gurlitt and the Secret of the Nazi Treasure	Documentary	1 x 45'	arte
2014	The Aldi Story - Karl and Theo Albrecht	Documentary	1 x 45'	ZDF
2013	1913 - Dance of the Century	Documentary	1 x 90'	arte
2013	German Dynasties: Lippe and His Royal House	Documentary	1 x 45'	WDR
2012	Silent Night in Stalingrad	Documentary	1 x 45'	ZDF
2012	The Kings of Sweden – A New Generation for the Monarchy	Documentary	1 x 45'	ZDF
2012	Gerhart Hauptmann: Rebel and Representative	Documentary	1 x 45'	3Sat
2012	German Dynasties: The Princes of Sayn-Wittgenstein-Berleburg	Documentary	1 x 45'	WDR
2012	German Dynasties: The Counts of Beissel von Gymnich	Documentary	1 x 45'	WDR
2012	Citizen Springer	Documentary	1 x 90'	arte/ZDF
2012	German Dynasties: The Opels	Documentary	1 x 45'	ARD
2012	German Dynasties: The Hohenzollerns	Documentary	1 x 45'	ARD
2012	Munich 72 - The documentary	Documentary	1 x 45'	ZDF
2012	The Drama of Dresden	Documentary	1 x 45'	ZDF
2011	KLITSCHKO	Documentary	1 x 90'	Kino
2011	Welcome Home	Mini-Series	6 x 30'	ZDFkultur
2011	John Fitzgerald’s Private Life	Documentary	1 x 45'	ZDF
2011	Too Young To Die: John Belushi	Mini-Series	1 x 52'	arte
2011	Too Young To Die: Kurt Cobain	Mini-Series	1 x 52'	arte
2011	Too Young To Die: Heath Ledger	Mini-Series	1 x 52'	arte
2011	Too Young To Die: Sharon Tate	Mini-Series	1 x 52'	arte
2011	The Kings of Sweden: Royal Affairs! Carl Gustaf and the Swedes	Documentary	1 x 45'	ZDF
2010	The chancellor who fell to his knees. The two lives of Willy Brandt.	Docudrama	1 x 90'	MDR
2010	The Grimaldis: noblesse oblige	Documentary	1 x 45'	ARD
2010	German Dynasties: The Thyssens	Documentary	1 x 45'	ARD
2010	German Dynasties: The Oetkers	Documentary	1 x 45'	ARD
2010	German Dynasties: The Gerlings	Documentary	1 x 45'	WDR
2010	The Kings of Sweden: Royal Wedding!: A Prince for Victoria	Documentary	1 x 45'	ZDF
2010	Dangerous trek through Caucasus	Documentary	1 x 45'	NDR
2010	The German Kaiser`s Empire	Documentary	3 x 45'	ZDF
2009	German Dynasties: The Princes of Bentheim-Tecklenburg	Documentary	1 x 45'	WDR
2009	The Miracle of Leipzig	Docudrama	1 x 90'	MDR, arte, TVP, Magyar TV, NRK, YLE
2009	The Kings of Sweden: The Kings` Children: Victoria and Daniel	Documentary	1 x 45'	ZDF
2009	Bella Italia – A Time Travel to Italy	Documentary	1 x 45'	WDR
2009	The Emerald Isle – A Time Travel to Ireland	Documentary	1 x 45'	WDR
2009	To live the Life of Riley – A Time Travel to the French Riviera	Documentary	1 x 45'	WDR
2009	German Dynasties: The Krupps	Documentary	1 x 45'	ZDF
2009	German Dynasties: The Counts of Oeynhausen-Sierstorpff	Documentary	1 x 45'	WDR
2008	German Dynasties: 4711 – Eau de Cologne	Documentary	1 x 45'	WDR
2008	The Human Footprint	Documentary	1 x 75'	ARD
2008	Majesty! Bhumibol and Sirikit of Thailand	Documentary	1 x 45'	ZDF
2008	Franz Josef Strauß – A German Story	Documentary	2 x 45'	ZDF
2008	German Dynasties: Deichmann	Documentary	1 x 45'	WDR
2007	German Dynasties: Oetker	Documentary	1 x 45'	WDR
2007	Legends: Heinz Rühmann	Documentary	1 x 45'	WDR
2007	The Kings of Sweden: The Kings` Children: Victoria and her Daniel	Documentary	1 x 45'	ZDF
2006	The Kings of Sweden: Majesty! Silvia and Carl Gustaf of Sweden	Documentary	1 x 45'	ZDF
2006	Bella Italia – In Love for Eternity	Documentary	2 x 45'	WDR
2006	German Dynasties: Haniel	Documentary	1 x 45'	ZDF
2006	Black September: Munich Olympics 1972 – The Attack	Documentary	1 x 90'	ZDF
2006	Germany – World Cup 2006: Champion of Hearts	Documentary	1 x 45'	ZDF
2006	Wembley '66 World Cup – The True Story	Documentary	1 x 45'	ZDF
2006	A Football Love Affaire	Docudrama	1 x 90'	ZDF
2006	Stalingrad – Director`s Cut	Documentary	1 x 90'	ZDF
2005	Drama of Dresden	Documentary	1 x 90'	ZDF
2004	Hitler`s Managers: Gustav and Alfried Krupp	Documentary	1 x 52'	History Channel
2004	Revolution ON AIR	Documentary	1 x 60'	NHK
2004	Miracle of Bern – The True Story	Documentary	1 x 90'	arte/ORF
2004	Miracle of Bern – The Game	Documentary	1 x 40'	ZDF
2004	The Longest Day	Documentary	1 x 52'	History Channel
2004	Makarenko principles	Documentary	1 x 45'	ZDFtheaterkanal
2003	Prisoners of War: The Return of the Ten Thousand	Documentary	1 x 45'	ZDF
2003	Stalingrad - A Trilogy	Documentary	1 x 52'	TVS/Teleac/NOT/YLE
2002	Foyer	Magazine	48 x 30'	ZDFtheaterkanal
2001	The War of the Century: Death Trap	Documentary	1 x 52'	History Channel

== Series ==
- Noble Dynasties in North Rhine-Westphalia
- German Dynasties
- Monarchies
- Theatre Makers
- Theatre Portraits
- Dynasties in North Rhine-Westphalia
- TOO Young TO DIE
- 'UNSER LAND'

== Awards and nominations won by Broadview TV ==
- 2020 German Television Award for "Resistance Fighters" (Best Editing Info/Documentary)
- 2020 Nominated – German Television Award for "Resistance Fighters" (Best Documentary)
- 2020 Award of Excellence Special Mention: Documentary Feature at the Impact DOCS Awards for "Resistance Fighters"
- 2019 Impact Award at the Vancouver International Film Festival for "Resistance Fighters"
- 2019 Grand Prix AST – Ville de Paris at the Pariscience Film Festival for "Resistance Fighters"
- 2019 Nominated – German Television Award for "Coal"
- 2018 Nominated – German Television Award for "3 Days in September" (Best Documentary)
- 2017 Deutsche Akademie für Fernsehen: Award for Myrna Drews for "Hedda" (Set design)
- 2017 Deutscher Wirtschaftsfilmpreis for "Germany's great clans - The C&A Story"
- 2015 RIAS TV Award for "Breath of Freedom"
- 2015 Nominated – Deutscher Filmpreis for "Nowitzki. The Perfect Shot"
- 2015 Nominated – Magnolia Award (Shanghai) for "Nowitzki. The Perfect Shot"
- 2014 Nominated – Magnolia Award (Shanghai), Prix Europe and Rockie Award (BANFF) for "Breath of Freedom"
- 2013 Bavarian TV Award for "Citizen Springer"
- 2013 Nominated – Sports Emmy Award for "KLITSCHKO"
- 2012 Deutscher Wirtschaftsfilmpreis Award for "Citizen Springer"
- 2012 Romy Award (Austria) for "KLITSCHKO" as 'Best Documentary Cinema' and for Leopold Hoesch as 'Best Producer'
- 2011 Magnolia Award (Shanghai) for "The chancellor who fell to his knees. The two lives of Willy Brandt."
- 2010 Banff World Media Festival Rockie Award for "The Miracle of Leipzig"
- 2010 WorldFest-Houston Gold Remi Award for "The Miracle of Leipzig"
- 2009 DocumFest (Timișoara, Romania) Great Prize Award for "The Miracle of Leipzig"
- 2006 Nominated – World Television Award (Banff) for "The Drama of Dresden"
- 2006 Magnolia Award (Shanghai) for "The Drama of Dresden"
- 2005 Nominated – World Television Award (Banff) for "The Miracle of Bern – The True Story"
- 2005 International Emmy Award (New York) for "The Drama of Dresden" (together with Sebastian Dehnhardt und Guido Knopp)
- 2004 Nominated – Magnolia Award (Shanghai) for "Stalingrad"
- 2004 German Television Award for "The Miracle of Bern – The True Story"
- 2003 Nominated – International Emmy Award for "Stalingrad"
