= Leopold Hoesch (film producer) =

German film producer

Leopold Hoesch (born February 16, 1969, in Cologne, West Germany) is a German film producer, International Emmy Award winner and founder of the production company Broadview TV. His films have received widespread acclaim for their depth, storytelling, and cultural impact.

== Early life and education ==
Leopold Hoesch was born and raised in Cologne, Germany. He holds a degree in Latin American Studies. His academic background has significantly influenced his approach to storytelling and production.

== Career ==
In 1999, Hoesch founded the production company Broadview TV GmbH. He acts as the executive manager. BROADVIEW has expanded its operations with subsidiaries such as BROADVIEW Pictures, BROADVIEW Music, TubeLounge GmbH, and BROADVIEW Distribution GmbH.

Hoesch has worked with the broadcasters ARD, ZDF, Arte, BBC, Prime Video, HBO, Sky and Netflix. His productions often focus on historical events, influential figures, and social issues, blending research with storytelling.

== Notable works ==
=== Sports documentaries ===
- Klitschko (2011): a documentary exploring the lives and careers of Ukrainian boxing champions Wladimir and Vitali Klitschko.
- Nowitzki: The Perfect Shot (2014): a biographical film about NBA star Dirk Nowitzki’s journey to becoming one of basketball’s greatest players.
- Schwarze Adler (Black Eagles, 2021): a documentary examining racism in German football through the experiences of Black players.
- DAS LETZTE TABU (2024)
- MOSES – 13 Steps (2024)
- Beckenbauer – Der letzte Kaiser (Beckenbauer – The Last Emperor, 2024): a biographical miniseries on German football legend Franz Beckenbauer.
- On the Wave (2025)

=== Historical and cultural documentaries ===
- Stalingrad Trilogy (2024): A three-part series offering an in-depth look at one of World War II’s most pivotal battles.
- The Drama of Dresden (2005): A documentary about the devastating Allied bombing of Dresden during World War II. The film portrays the tragedy through eyewitness accounts from Dresden residents and British pilots. It won the International Emmy Award for Best Documentary in 2005.
- DIE UNBEUGSAMEN (2021)
- Silent Pandemic: The Global Fight Against Antimicrobial Resistance (2022)
- DIE UNBEUGSAMEN 2 – Guten Morgen, ihr Schönen! (2024)

=== Biographical documentaries ===
- Angela Merkel – A Lagecy Through Time (2022): a portrait of Germany’s first female chancellor Angela Merkel.

== Awards and recognition ==
Leopold Hoesch has received numerous awards for his work, including:

- International Emmy Award: Recognizing excellence in television production.
- German Television Award (Deutscher Fernsehpreis): For outstanding contributions to German television.
- Grimme Preis (Grimme-Preis): Honoring exceptional quality in television programming.
- Bavarian Television Award (Bayerischer Fernsehpreis)

Hoesch is also a German ambassador for the International Academy of Television Arts and Sciences.
