= 2014 Vancouver International Film Festival =

Canadian Film Festival

- Opening film: Wild by Jean-Marc Vallée
- Closing film: Whiplash by Damien Chazelle
- Location: Vancouver, British Columbia, Canada
- Festival date: September 25–October 10, 2014

The 2014 Vancouver International Film Festival, the 33rd event in the history of the Vancouver International Film Festival, was held from September 25 to October 10, 2014.

The festival's opening gala film was Jean-Marc Vallée's Wild, and its closing gala was Damien Chazelle's Whiplash.

== Awards ==
Award winners were announced on October 10.

Award	Film	Filmmaker
People's Choice	The Vancouver Asahi	Yuya Ishii
Most Popular Canadian Feature	Preggoland	Jacob Tierney
Most Popular Canadian Documentary	All the Time in the World	Suzanne Crocker
Most Popular International Documentary	Glen Campbell: I'll Be Me	James Keach
Best Canadian Film	Violent	Andrew Huculiak
Best BC Film	Violent	Andrew Huculiak
BC Emerging Filmmaker	Sitting on the Edge of Marlene	Ana Valine
Most Promising Director of a Canadian Short Film	The Cut (La Coupe)	Geneviève Dulude-De Celles
VIFF Impact Award	Just Eat It: A Food Waste Story	Grant Baldwin
Women in Film and Television Artistic Merit Award	Sitting on the Edge of Marlene	Ana Valine

== Films ==
=== Special Presentations ===
- Above Us All — Eugene Jensen
- Amazonia 3D — Thierry Ragobert
- Cathedrals of Culture — Michael Madsen, Michael Glawogger, Margreth Olin, Karim Aïnouz, Robert Redford, Wim Wenders
- Clouds of Sils Maria — Olivier Assayas
- Foxcatcher — Bennett Miller
- Goodbye to Language — Jean-Luc Godard
- The Golden Era — Ann Hui
- Living Is Easy with Eyes Closed — David Trueba
- Maps to the Stars — David Cronenberg
- Men, Women & Children — Jason Reitman
- The Riot Club — Lone Scherfig
- The Tale of the Princess Kaguya — Isao Takahata
- The Vancouver Asahi — Yuya Ishii
- Welcome to Me — Shira Piven
- Wild Tales — Damián Szifron
- Winter Sleep — Nuri Bilge Ceylan

=== Canadian Images ===
- 1987 — Ricardo Trogi
- All the Time in the World — Suzanne Crocker
- Black Fly — Jason Bourque
- The Boy From Geita — Vic Sarin
- Bye Bye Blues — Anne Wheeler
- Corbo — Mathieu Denis
- The Creation of Meaning — Simone Rapisarda Casanova
- A Different Drummer: Celebrating Eccentrics — John Zaritsky
- Dirty Singles — Alex Pugsley
- Elephant Song — Charles Binamé
- Everything Will Be — Julia Kwan
- An Eye for Beauty (La Règne de la beauté) — Denys Arcand
- Fall — Terrance Odette
- Just Eat It: A Food Waste Story — Grant Baldwin
- Marinoni: The Fire in the Frame — Tony Girardin
- Martin's Pink Pickle — René Brar
- Miraculum — Daniel Grou
- Mommy — Xavier Dolan
- Monsoon — Sturla Gunnarsson
- October Gale — Ruba Nadda
- Preggoland — Jacob Tierney
- The Price We Pay — Harold Crooks
- The Pristine Coast — Scott Renyard
- Sitting on the Edge of Marlene — Ana Valine
- Songs She Wrote About People She Knows — Kris Elgstrand
- Turbulence — Soran Mardookhi
- Two 4 One — Maureen Bradley
- The Valley Below — Kyle Thomas
- Violent — Andrew Huculiak
- What Are We Doing Here? (Qu’est-ce qu’on fait ici ?) — Julie Hivon
- You're Sleeping Nicole (Tu dors Nicole) — Stéphane Lafleur

=== Cinema of Our Time ===
- 52 Tuesdays — Sophie Hyde
- Asteroid — Marcelo Tobar
- August Winds (Ventos de Agosto) — Gabriel Mascaro
- Beautiful Youth (Hermosa juventud) — Jaime Rosales
- Behavior (Conducta) — Ernesto Daranas
- Beloved Sisters (Die geliebten Schwestern) — Dominik Graf
- Boy and the World (O Menino e o Mundo) — Alê Abreu
- Boychoir — François Girard
- Buzzard — Joel Potrykus
- Casa Grande — Fellipe Barbosa
- Charlie's Country — Rolf de Heer
- Class Enemy (Razredni sovražnik) — Rok Biček
- Clownwise (Klauni) — Viktor Tauš
- Come to My Voice (Were Denge Min) — Hüseyin Karabey
- Corn Island (Simindis kundzuli) — Giorgi Ovashvili
- Decent People (Gente de bien) — Franco Lolli
- Difret — Zeresenay Berhane Mehari
- Field of Dogs (Psie Pole) — Lech Majewski
- Fish & Cat — Shahram Mokri
- The Fool (Durak) — Yuri Bykov
- Force Majeure (Turist) — Ruben Östlund
- Free Fall (Szabadesés) — György Pálfi
- The Gambler (Losejas) — Ignas Jonynas
- God Help the Girl — Stuart Murdoch
- Güeros — Alonso Ruizpalacios
- Heaven Knows What — Ben and Joshua Safdie
- Highway — Imtiaz Ali
- History of Fear (Historia del Miedo) — Benjamín Naishtat
- Hope and Wire — Gaylene Preston
- Horse Money (Cavalo Dinheiro) — Pedro Costa
- Human Capital (Il capitale umano) — Paolo Virzì
- In Order of Disappearance (Kraftidioten) — Hans Petter Moland
- Jauja — Lisandro Alonso
- The Kindergarten Teacher — Nadav Lapid
- Lakshmi — Nagesh Kukunoor
- Leviathan — Andrey Zvyagintsev
- The Liberator (Libertador) — Alberto Arvelo
- Listen Up Philip — Alex Ross Perry
- Manos sucias — Josef Wladyka
- Mr. Turner — Mike Leigh
- N – The Madness of Reason — Peter Krüger
- Navajazo — Ricardo Silva
- Noble — Stephen Bradley
- Of Horses and Men (Hross í oss) — Benedikt Erlingsson
- The Owners — Adilkhan Yerzhanov
- Papusza — Joanna Kos-Krauze, Krzysztof Krauze
- Parasite (Huba) — Wilhelm Sasnal, Anka Sasnal
- Paris of the North (París Norðursins) — Hafsteinn Gunnar Sigurðsson
- Phoenix — Christian Petzold
- The Princess of France (La princesa de Francia) — Matías Piñeiro
- Queen and Country — John Boorman
- Red Knot — Scott Cohen
- Rocks in My Pockets (Akmeņi manās kabatās) — Signe Baumane
- The Rooftops — Merzak Allouache
- Run — Philippe Lacôte
- Something Must Break (Nånting måste gå sönder) — Ester Martin Bergsmark
- Sorrow and Joy (Sorg og glæde) — Nils Malmros
- Stations of the Cross (Kreuzweg) — Dietrich Brüggemann
- Still Life — Uberto Pasolini
- Tales — Rakhshān Banietemad
- To Kill a Man (Matar a un hombre) — Alejandro Fernández Almendras
- Two Days, One Night (Deux jours, une nuit) — Jean-Pierre and Luc Dardenne
- The Two Faces of January — Hossein Amini
- Two Shots Fired (Dos disparos) — Martín Rejtman
- Two Step — Alex R. Johnson
- Una Vida: A Fable of Music and the Mind — Richie Adams
- Welcome to New York — Abel Ferrara
- White Bird in a Blizzard — Gregg Araki
- The Womb (El Vientre) — Daniel Rodríguez Risco
- The Wonders (Le meraviglie) — Alice Rohrwacher
- Zero Motivation — Talya Lavie

=== Spotlight on France ===
- 24 Days (24 jours, la vérité sur l'affaire Ilan Halimi) — Alexandre Arcady
- Handmade with Love from France (Le Temps suspendu) — Julie Georgia Bernard
- In the Name of My Daughter (L'Homme qu'on aimait trop) — André Téchiné
- The Kidnapping of Michel Houellebecq (L'enlèvement de Michel Houellebecq) — Guillaume Nicloux
- Life of Riley (Aimer, boire et chanter) — Alain Resnais
- Li'l Quinquin (P'tit Quinquin) — Bruno Dumont
- Love at First Fight (Les Combattants) — Thomas Cailley
- Miss and the Doctors (Tirez la langue, mademoiselle) — Axelle Ropert
- La Sapienza — Eugène Green

=== Documentaries ===
- Becoming Bulletproof — Michael Barnett
- Challat of Tunis — Kaouther Ben Hania
- Concerning Violence — Göran Hugo Olsson
- The Creator of the Jungle (Sobre la marxa) — Jordi Morató
- A Dangerous Game — Anthony Baxter
- The Decent One (Der Anständige) — Vanessa Lapa
- Faith Connections — Pan Nalin
- Flore (Flore, route de la Mer) — Jean-Albert Lièvre
- Food Chains — Sanjay Rawal
- How I Came to Hate Math (Comment j'ai détesté les maths) — Olivier Peyon
- Iranian — Mehran Tamadon
- Jalanan — Daniel Ziv
- Maidan — Sergei Loznitsa
- Marmato — Mark Grieco
- Meat and Milk (De chair et de lait) — Bernard Bloch
- My Name Is Salt — Farida Pacha
- Nelson Mandela, the Myth and Me — Khalo Matabane
- New Boobs — Sacha Polak
- Red Army — Gabe Polsky
- Sacro GRA — Gianfranco Rosi
- Waiting for August — Teodora Ana Mihai
- Walking Under Water — Eliza Kubarska
- We Come as Friends — Hubert Sauper
- The Wild Years (Els anys salvatges) — Ventura Durall
- The Wound and the Gift — Linda Hoaglund
- Yakona — Anlo Sepulveda, Paul Collins

=== Dragons & Tigers ===
- 2030 (Nước) — Nguyễn Võ Nghiêm Minh
- Black Coal, Thin Ice — Diao Yinan
- Blind Massage — Lou Ye
- Coming Home — Zhang Yimou
- A Corner of Heaven — Zhang Miaoyan
- Disconcerto — Tatsushi Omori
- The Dossier — Rikun Zhu
- Exit — Chienn Hsiang
- Flowing Stories — Jessey Tsang Tsui-Shan
- The Furthest End Awaits — Chiang Hsiu-chiung
- Hill of Freedom — Hong Sang-soo
- The Horses of Fukushima — Yojyu Matsubayashi
- The Iron Ministry — J.P. Sniadecki
- Journey to the West — Tsai Ming-liang
- The Jungle School — Riri Riza
- Man on High Heels — Jang Jin
- Men Who Save the World — Liew Seng Tat
- The Midnight After — Fruit Chan
- Non Fiction Diary — Jung Yoon-suk
- Ow — Yohei Suzuki
- Rekorder — Mikhail Red
- Revivre — Im Kwon-taek
- Sea Fog (Haemoo) — Shim Sung-bo
- Sharing — Makoto Shinozaki
- The Sun, The Moon & The Hurricane — Andri Cung
- Uncertain Relationships Society — Heiward Mak
- The Uncle Victory — Zhang Meng

=== Altered States ===
- Alleluia — Fabrice Du Welz
- Bloody Knuckles — Matt O'Mahony
- The Editor — Adam Brooks and Matthew Kennedy
- A Girl Walks Home Alone at Night — Ana Lily Amirpour
- Housebound — Gerard Johnstone
- The Incident (El Incidente) — Isaac Ezban
- The Infinite Man — Hugh Sullivan
- It Follows — David Robert Mitchell
- The Well — Thomas Hammock

=== Arts & Letters ===
- Advanced Style — Lina Plioplyte
- Art and Craft — Sam Cullman, Jennifer Grausman
- Ballet 422 — Jody Lee Lipes
- Before the Last Curtain Falls — Thomas Wallner
- Cartoonists - Foot Soldiers of Democracy — Stéphanie Valloatto
- Dominguinhos — Mariana Aydar, Joaquim Castro, Eduardo Nazarian
- Finding Fela — Alex Gibney
- Glen Campbell: I'll Be Me — James Keach
- The Great Museum — Johannes Holzhausen
- Ilya and Emilia Kabakov: Enter Here — Amei Wallach
- In Search of Chopin — Phil Grabsky
- Looking for Light: Jane Bown — Luke Dodd, Michael Whyte
- Mercedes Sosa: The Voice of Latin America — Rodrigo H. Vila
- Miss Hill: Making Dance Matter — Greg Vander Veer
- Nas: Time Is Illmatic — One9
- National Gallery — Frederick Wiseman
- The Other One: The Long Strange Trip of Bob Weir — Mike Fleiss
- The Past Is a Grotesque Animal — Jason Miller
- The Possibilities Are Endless — James Hall, Edward Lovelace
- Pulp: A Film About Life, Death and Supermarkets — Florian Habicht
- Que Caramba es la Vida — Doris Dörrie
- Regarding Susan Sontag — Nancy Kates
- The Salt of the Earth — Wim Wenders, Juliano Ribeiro Salgado
- Trespassing Bergman — Jane Magnusson, Hynek Pallas

=== Canadian Short Films ===
- 3rd Page from the Sun — Theodore Ushev
- 40 Candles — Sophie Jarvis
- The Acting Teacher — Aaron Craven
- Back Streets — Cameron MacGowan
- Bedbugs: A Musical Love Story — Matthew Kowalchuk
- Bengal Light — Olivier Godin
- Bison — Kevan Funk
- The Blue Marble — Co Hoedeman
- Broken Face — Alain Fournier
- Broken Palace — Ross Munro
- Burnt Grass — Ray Wong
- Chamber Drama — Jeffrey Zablotny
- The Chaperone — Fraser Munden
- The Cut (La Coupe) — Geneviève Dulude-De Celles
- Cutaway — Kazik Radwanski
- Day 40 — Sol Friedman
- Dead Hearts — Stephen W. Martin
- Dorsal — Aidan Shipley
- Eclissi — Tygh Runyan
- Fallow — Breanna Cheek
- Godhead — Connor Gaston
- Hard Card — Lucas Hrubizna
- The Hearing — Russell Ratt-Brascoupe
- Hole — Martin Edralin
- Howard and Jean — Heather Young
- Just Living — Bryan Demore and Neil Champagne
- Jutra — Marie-Josée Saint-Pierre
- Kreb — Tim Tracey
- Land of the Sun — Melissa Flagg
- Life's a Bitch (Toutes des connes) — François Jaros
- Lifers — Joel Salaysay
- Light — Yassmina Karajah
- Little Brother (Petit frère) — Rémi St-Michel
- Luk'Luk'I: Mother — Wayne Wapeemukwa
- Mynarski Death Plummet — Matthew Rankin
- Never Stop Cycling — Colin Lepper
- Not Indian Enough — Alex Zahara
- Pour Retourner — Scooter Corkle
- The Rehearsal — Carl-Antonyn Dufault
- Righteous — Cory Bowles
- Ship — Jeff Petry
- Sleeping Giant — Andrew Cividino
- Stray — Ashley McKenzie
- Tigerbomb! — Andrew Struthers
- A Tomb with a View — Ryan J. Noth
- The Weatherman and the Shadowboxer — Randall Okita
- What Doesn't Kill You — Rob Grant
- Withering Heights — Liz Cairns

=== International Short Films ===
- 130909: A Portrait of Marina Abramovic — Matthu Placek
- 6-Minute Mom — Chris Shimojima
- Absolution — Dean Butler
- All the Pain in the World — Tommaso Pitta
- Alphonso — Erenik Beqiri
- Anal Juice — Sawako Kabuki
- Anmado/Clean Me — Kang Sangwoo
- The Black Butterflies — Antoine Blanchet
- Budding, Swelling — Ryoya Usuha
- Business as Usual: The Prophet's on Board (Business As Usual – Der Prophet fliegt mit) — Lenn Kudrjawizki
- Cowboy Ben — Scott Rawsthorne, Jon Shaikh
- David Hockey: In the Now — Lucy Walker
- De Riria Subasutaimu — Shinsaku Hidaka
- Deaf and Wind — Hwang Kyuil
- Emo: The Musical — Neil Triffett
- Flower Bud — Saki Nakano
- Grounded — Alexis Michalik
- Gyro — Madoka
- Hollygrove: The True Life Story of Monserrat — Carlos Hurtado
- I'm Not a Hairdresser — Lee Hyungsuk
- In the Blind — Davis Hall
- Inside Voices — Ryland Walker Knight
- Katie — Nathan Gotsch
- Keep Dancing — Greg Vander Veer
- Leidi — Simon Mesa Soto
- Letter to Annabelle — Dom Marano
- The Light Harvester — Jason Howden
- The Lion's Mouth Opens — Lucy Walker
- A Long Beside — Paul Wong
- Magnificent View — Nam Keunhak
- Nest of Stone — Kim Noce
- Newspaper — Yoshinao Satoh
- Niagara — Chie Hayakawa
- No One But Lydia — Rob Richert
- Out of Reach (Rain Night) — Pablo Diartinez
- Outlier — Martin Wallner
- Penance — Jeff Wolfe
- Phone Box — Alan Powell
- Rain on Film — Tim Woodall, Phil Drinkwater
- Rappa — Yuki Nakajima
- Rattlefly — Min Ding
- Revelations — Annakate Chappell
- Los Rosales — Daniel Ferreira
- Sequence — Carles Torrens
- Skunk — Annie Silverstein
- The Small Garden — Shunsuke Saito
- Snow Hut — Yoriko Mizushiri
- Soliton — Isamu Hirabayashi
- Sophie — Alex Lombard
- The Stomach — Ben Steiner
- They Came at Night — Andrew Ellis, Alex Mallis
- The Tide Keeper — Alyx Duncan
- Waiter — Ryoji Yamada
- White, Heat, Lights — Takashi Nakajima
