= Dakota Daulby =

Canadian actor (born 1994)

- Born: October 10, 1994 (age 32); Vancouver, British Columbia, Canada
- Occupations: Actor, Director, Producer, Writer
- Years active: 2010–present
- Website: www.dakotadaulby.com

Dakota Daulby (born October 10, 1994) is a Canadian film and television actor, producer, director and screenwriter.

== Early life ==
Daulby was born in Vancouver, British Columbia. He spends his time between his home town of Maple Ridge and Vancouver. He started his two-year acting program under the department head and Gemini Award winning actor Phil Granger and completed the program with honours in September 2014.

== Career ==
Daulby entered the American market with work on TV shows such as Falling Skies and Wayward Pines. He discovered his love for acting at a young age and proceeded to enroll in New Image College.

=== 2011–2014: Early roles ===
Daulby got his first break after landing the lead role in the award-winning short film Why Does God Hate Me?, written and directed by Joel Ashton McCarthy. The film was featured at the New York Film Festival and other film festivals across the world.

Daulby next appeared in the Lifetime film Girl Fight by director Stephen Gyllenhaal. He cited Gyllenhaal's son, Jake Gyllenhaal as a major influence on his career.

The following year, Daulby landed the starring role in the feature film The Woodcarver, alongside John Ratzenberger. He co-starred as the love interest in the Leo Award-winning big screen adaptation Sitting on the Edge of Marlene alongside Paloma Kwiatkowski and Suzanne Clément, adapted from the novella The Trouble With Marlene by Billie Livingston.

=== 2014–present: Falling Skies and beyond ===
Daulby appeared in the series Spooksville, CW's iZombie, Pretty Little Addict, Batwoman, Van Helsing, and in a recurring role on the fourth season of Falling Skies. Daulby portrays the ruthless Nazi-esque head of the Espheni brainwashing camps, Kent Matthews. On the show, he worked closely with Maxim Knight, Noah Wyle, Will Patton, Doug Jones and Colin Cunningham.

In early 2014, Daulby won the leading role in the Canadian horror thriller, Black Fly, which was released at international film festivals in 2015. Daulby received a nomination at Leo Awards for "Best Male Lead in a Motion Picture" - losing to his Black Fly co-star Matthew MacCaull. In November 2015, Daulby was nominated for and won the ACTRA Union of BC Performers (UBCP) award for the best emerging performer for his role in Black Fly.

Daulby co-wrote, co-directed, and co-produced over 20 short and alternative media films with New Image Entertainment. In 2016, he had a guest starring role opposite Academy Award nominatee Djimon Hounsou, in M. Night Shyamalan's Wayward Pines. Daulby played Travis in the Luc Besson fantasy epic, The Warriors Gate.

=== Other projects ===
Daulby was the co-creator of the Vancouver-based 72 horror film festival, The Phrike Filmfest - also acting as the shows official MC. He is highly involved in New Image College's community events, he hosted and appeared on such shows like Breakfast Television, the Fair at the PNE, Electric Playground and Shaw Television.

Daulby appears in the CW's The 100 as Sheidheda.

== Filmography ==
Year	Title	Role	Notes
2010	Camp Goodtimes	Max	Short film
2011	Why Does God Hate Me?	Matthew	Short Film
2011	Girl Fight	Sophomore Boy #1	TV movie
2012	The Woodcarver	Matthew	TV movie
2013	Mimi & Me	Sam Vaughn	Short Film
2014	Spooksville	Jerome Simone; 1 episode	TV series
2014	Falling Skies	Kent Matthews; 5 episodes	TV series
2014	Sitting on the Edge of Marlene	Drew	Movie
2014	Roar	Josh	Short Film; Nominated – Leo Award for Best Lead Performance by a Male in a Short Drama
2014	Black Fly	Jake Henson	Movie; Nominated – Leo Award for Best Lead Performance by a Male in a Motion Picture; Nominated – UBCP/ACTRA Award for Best Newcomer
2014	Josh & Tom	Tom; co-producer	Short Film
2014	That Strawberry?	Co-writer, co-director, and co-producer	Short Film
2015	iZombie	Tommy/Tom; 2 episodes	TV series
2016	Pretty Little Addict	Tyler Kinan	TV movie
2016	The Warriors Gate	Travis	Movie
2016	Wayward Pines	Griffin; 1 episode	TV series Nominated – Leo Award for Best Guest Performance by a Male in a Dramatic Series
2018	Freaks	Executioner	Movie
2019–2020	The 100	Sheidheda/ Dark Commander	TV series
2021	Black Summer	Sonny	TV series
2021	The Last Victim	Tad	Movie
2022–2023	Mayans M.C.	Joker	TV series
2024	Shōgun	Salamon	TV series
2024	Longlegs	Agent Horatio Fisk	Movie
2025	Smoke	Lee	Miniseries
2026	Tight Lettuce (Tissé serré)	Joel	Feature film
