= The Family of the Forest =

- French: La famille de la forêt
- Directed by: Laura Rietveld
- Written by: Laura Rietveld
- Produced by: Katarina Soukup
- Starring: Gérard Mathar; Catherine Jacob
- Cinematography: Alex Margineanu
- Edited by: Annie Leclair
- Music by: Ramachandra Borcar
- Production company: Catbird Productions
- Distributed by: Les Films du 3 mars
- Release date: March 31, 2022
- Running time: 85 minutes
- Country: Canada
- Language: French

The Family of the Forest (French: La famille de la forêt) is a Canadian documentary film, directed by Laura Rietveld and released in 2022. The film profiles Gérard Mathar and Catherine Jacob, a couple from Belgium who have moved to Canada to live off the land on a 22-acre property in the Gaspé Peninsula region of Quebec, where they run their own business selling foraged food products.

== Distribution ==
The film premiered on March 31, 2022, at the Vues sur mer film festival in Gaspé, before going into commercial release on April 8.

It was later screened at other Canadian film festivals, including the Windsor International Film Festival, the Kingston Canadian Film Festival, and the Oakville Festivals of Film and Art.

It received its television premiere in 2025, being added to Ici TOU.TV in Canada and broadcast on Arte in Europe.

== Critical response ==
Pat Mullen of Point of View wrote that "as family portraits go, Family of the Forest will especially appeal to fans of the festival circuit hit All the Time in the World. This film offers a companion of sorts to Suzanne Crocker's account of her family's one-year experiment living off-grid up north. Both films remind audiences of the deep connection to be had with nature and the freedom of escaping the hustle of urban life. However, Family of the Forest also asks if such life truly is an escape if it requires 24/7 commitment. There's a difference between a year-long trial of unplugging and a complete lifestyle commitment."

== Awards ==
The film was the winner of the People's Choice Award at the Kingston Canadian Film Festival.
