= Kingston Canadian Film Festival =

Coordinates: 44°14′N 76°30′W

- Location: Kingston, Ontario, Canada
- Founded: 2001
- Language: English; French
- Website: http://www.kingcanfilmfest.com

The Kingston Canadian Film Festival (KCFF) is an annual, non-profit, week-long film festival held in Kingston, Ontario, Canada. It showcases exclusively Canadian cinema and artists. Founded in 2001, the festival has grown into the largest standalone showcase of Canadian cinema, presenting a range of programming including feature films, short films, documentaries, and in-person events such as panels, Q&As, and occasional live performances.

Though the festival takes place in late winter, the organization also offers year-round programming.

== History ==
The Kingston Canadian Film Festival (KCFF) was founded in 2001 by Alex Jansen, who was then studying Film at Queen’s University. The inaugural event was a three-day showcase held at The Screening Room, a repertory cinema in downtown Kingston that Jansen managed at the time. The festival was launched with support from Moving Pictures: Canadian Films on Tour, which was succeeded by backing from the Toronto International Film Festival (TIFF) Group in 2003.

By its second year (2002), the festival added a second, larger venue on the Queen's University campus. The festival saw substantial growth in programming that year, from a shorts competition, to another day of the festival; making it the largest stand-alone showcase of feature films from across Canada. Subsequent years saw the introduction of new programming and outreach efforts. The Local Filmmaking Initiative (LFI) was launched in 2003 with support from the City of Kingston’s Healthy Community Fund. In 2006, a French Community Outreach program was added, followed by high school outreach programming in 2008 in partnership with Reel Canada.

Leadership also shifted in 2006 when Alison Migneault, who had just become co-director the previous year, became Festival Director. Jansen continued to serve in a consulting role. The following year, the Festival launched its first-ever retrospective series, around the 50th anniversary of film-making by the acclaimed Canadian director Allan King.

The Festival held a local short film competition (10 Years, 10 Minutes), for a local team to produce a short film to be premiered at the 10th anniversary festival, awarding the winner $5,000 cash and professional mentorship. In 2011, they celebrated the 10th anniversary, premiered the winner, and hosted a special screening of the silent film Carry On Sergeant!.

The 2020 festival was cancelled due to the COVID-19 pandemic. A fully digital format was adopted in 2021, shifted to hybrid in 2022, and returned fully to in-person programming in 2023, incorporating the newly renovated Broom Factory as a venue. This period also saw KCFF developing its year-round activities. New initiatives included the Slaight Music Video Program (launched in 2019), the 18mm Program (2023), and the KCFF Doc Factory (2025).

In 2024, KCFF awarded $25,000 to Blaine Watters (winner of the 25 Years 25 Minutes Pitch Competition) to create a short film for the 25th anniversary Fest in 2025.

== Programming ==
KCFF primarily showcases Canadian films, including narrative features, documentaries, and short films. The festival features both English- and French-language works, and regularly includes Indigenous cinema.

=== Key Festival Programs and Events ===
==== Feature Film Screenings ====
The festival typically screens 30–40 Canadian feature films annually, including works by first-time filmmakers, established directors, and award-winning productions.

==== Short Film Programs ====
KCFF screens approximately 50–75 short films each year, presented in four themed programs.

==== Special Events ====
The festival features Q&As, podcasts, panels, and workshops with filmmakers and industry professionals, along with industry events like receptions, awards, and networking for both new and established creatives. It also offers special presentations, including live music, comedy, and stage performances by Canadian artists, and its own podcast called Rewind Fast Forward, with host Thom Ernst.

=== Year-Round Activities ===
In addition to the annual festival, KCFF presents year-round programming such as community screenings, workshops, and special events. These are often produced in collaboration with local organizations, schools, and Queen’s University. KCFF worked in partnership with RAW Design and KPP Concerts to open The Broom Factory, a venue that hosts many of the festival’s educational and filmmaking initiatives and acts as the main office of the organization.

Ongoing programs include the 18MM Program, a mentorship and production initiative for youth filmmakers; the KCFF Doc Factory, which provides training for emerging documentary creators; and the Slaight Music Video Program, a collaborative project that pairs local filmmakers with musicians to produce original music videos.

== Venues ==
KCFF takes place at various venues throughout downtown Kingston, including:

- Isabel Bader Centre for the Performing Arts
- The Screening Room
- Grand Theatre
- Broom Factory

== Awards ==
KCFF presents a number of awards annually, including both audience-selected and juried categories:

- People’s Choice Award – Voted on by audiences, All feature films are automatically in competition.
- Doug Falconer Award of Excellence – Awarded annually to a Kingston-based film professional for outstanding contributions to film. Selected by the Douglas J. Falconer charitable committee.
- Best Canadian Short – Open to all films in the Canadian Shorts program
- Best Local Short – Open to all films in the Local Shorts program showcasing work from the Kingston region.
- Favourite Music Video – Voted on by audiences
- Best Music Video – A juried award
- Best Youth Short – Open to all films in the Youth Shorts program by local young filmmakers.
- KCFF Doc Factory Award – A juried award
- KCFF 18 MM Award – A juried award

=== People's Choice Award ===
The most popular film with festival audiences.

Year	Film	Director(s)	Ref
2006	The Life and Hard Times of Guy Terrifico	Michael Mabbott	
2007	Snow Cake	Marc Evans	
2008	Amal	Richie Mehta	
2009	One Week	Michael McGowan	
2010	The Trotsky	Jacob Tierney	
2011	Incendies	Denis Villeneuve	
2012	Monsieur Lazhar	Philippe Falardeau	
2013	Still Mine	Michael McGowan	
2014	Siddharth	Richie Mehta	
2015	All the Time in the World	Suzanne Crocker	
2016	Guantanamo’s Child: Omar Khadr	Michelle Shephard, Patrick Reed	
2017	Operation Avalanche	Matt Johnson	
2018	Don't Talk to Irene	Pat Mills	
2019	The Grizzlies	Miranda de Pencier	
2021	Beans	Tracey Deer	
2021	You Will Remember Me (Tu te souviendras de moi)	Éric Tessier	
2022	Wildhood	Bretten Hannam	
2023	The Family of the Forest (La famille de la forêt)	Laura Rietveld	
2024	Irena's Vow	Louise Archambault	
2025	Blue Sky Jo (La petite et le vieux)	Patrice Sauvé	
2026	Montreal, My Beautiful (Montréal, ma belle)	Xiaodan He	

=== Best Canadian Film ===
Sponsored by Playback, a juried award for best Canadian film introduced in 2025.

Year	Film	Director(s)	Ref
2025	Shepherds (Bergers)	Sophie Deraspe	
2026	The Cost of Heaven (Gagne ton ciel)	Mathieu Denis	

=== Best First Feature ===
Year	Film	Director(s)	Ref
2022	Islands	Martin Edralin	
2025	The Last Meal (Le Dernier repas)	Maryse Legagneur	
2026	Follies (Folichonneries)	Éric K. Boulianne	

=== Best Short Film ===
Year	Film	Director(s)	Ref
2018	Newborn	Ray Savaya	
2019	Suede	Danny Belair	
2021	Scars	Alex Anna	
2022	Amani	Alliah Fafin	
2023	Split Ends	Alireza Kazemipour	
2024	Meteor	Atefeh Khademolreza	
2025	Fantas	Halima Elkhatabi	
2026	No Matter the Weather (Beau temps, mauvais temps)	Florence Lafond	

=== Favourite Short Film ===
Year	Film	Director(s)	Ref
2021	Sinking Ship	Sasha Leigh Henry	
2022	Forgotten	Margran Shaw	

== Organization ==
The festival is organized by a registered not-for-profit charitable corporation, overseen by a volunteer board of directors and managed by a small staff team. It is supported by a mix of public and private funding, including grants, sponsorships, ticket revenue, and donations.

The organization is run by Executive Director Marc Garniss, and the Chair of the Board of Directors is Blaine Allan.

== See also ==
- Film Festivals in Canada – A list of film festivals held in Canada
- Cinema of Canada – History of and information on English cinema of Canada
- Cinema of Quebec – History of and information on French cinema of Canada
