= Ash (2019 film) =

- Directed by: Andrew Huculiak
- Written by: Andrew Huculiak; Josh Huculiak; Cayne McKenzie; Joseph Schweers
- Produced by: Josh Huculiak; Brent Hodge; Andrew Huculiak; Nicole Irene Dyck
- Starring: Tim Guinee; Chelah Horsdal; Eric Keenleyside; Cameron Crosby
- Cinematography: Joseph Schweers
- Edited by: Joseph Schweers; Andrew Huculiak
- Music by: Cayne McKenzie; We Are the City
- Production companies: Amazing Factory; Hodgee Films; The Film Farm; Goodbye Productions
- Distributed by: Game Theory Films
- Release date: September 30, 2019 (Vancouver International Film Festival)
- Running time: 104 minutes
- Country: Canada
- Language: English

Ash is a 2019 Canadian drama film directed by Andrew Huculiak and starring Tim Guinee, Chelah Horsdal, Eric Keenleyside, and Cameron Crosby. It is the second film directed by Huculiak and the second feature-length film produced by the Vancouver-based production company Amazing Factory Productions. The film premiered at the 2019 Vancouver International Film Festival and is currently making a festival run internationally.

== Premise ==
Reporting from the frontlines of the Okanagan wildfires, Stan (Tim Guinee) documents uncommon heroism on his blog while hoping for a big break that’ll make him a household name beyond Peachland, British Columbia. When he's accused of a disturbing crime that damages his marriage and reputation, however, he must scramble to salvage what's left of his life.

== Production ==
Amazing Factory Productions kept a day-by-day production journal on the film's official website "www.imnotabadperson.com." I'm Not A Bad Person being the title of the screenplay before the name of the film was changed during production. "Day 1" was considered to be September 14, 2014, while the team's first film, Violent was still being shopped around at film festivals. The team sat around a bonfire discussing a controversial idea for a new film. The film would be loosely based on a true story about a childhood family friend of Huculiak's.

It wasn't until June 2016, while the film was still in pre-production, that the team determined that the story they were crafting would be set amongst a violent wildfire in the Canadian wilderness, and so prior to any casting, and without a finished script, Joseph Schweers and Josh Huculiak drove into a wildfire to gather shots for the film.

The film was finished in December 2017, and made its world premiere at the 2019 Vancouver International Film Festival. It is currently making an international film festival run.

== Reception ==
Film critic Adrian Mack of Georgia Straight said, "When VIFF wraps on October 11, Ash is the film people will be talking about. Andrew Huculiak’s latest is both an astonishing technical feat and, thematically, a potentially explosive act of daring. It’s hard to know which was more dangerous."
