= Who's Driving Doug =

- Directed by: David Michael Conley
- Written by: Michael Carnick
- Produced by: Nicole Carbonetta; David Michael Katz
- Starring: RJ Mitte; Paloma Kwiatkowski; Daphne Zuniga; Ray William Johnson; Travis Flores
- Cinematography: Tom Clancey
- Edited by: Bob Mori
- Music by: Chad Rehmann; Death Cab for Cutie
- Production company: Katz Agency
- Distributed by: Filmbuff; Haley's Flight, LLC
- Release date: February 26, 2016
- Running time: 99 minutes
- Country: United States
- Language: English

Who's Driving Doug is a 2016 American independent drama road film directed by David Michael Conley, starring RJ Mitte, Paloma Kwiatkowski, Daphne Zuniga, and Ray William Johnson, and featuring Travis Flores. It was produced by David Katz and Nicola Carbonetta and written by Michael Carnick. The film follows Doug (Mitte), an introvert with muscular dystrophy who goes on a road trip with driver Scott (Johnson) and friend Stephanie (Kwiatkowski) in order to get away from his overbearing mother (Zuniga).

== Cast ==
- RJ Mitte as Doug
- Paloma Kwiatkowski as Stephanie
- Daphne Zuniga as Alison
- Ray William Johnson as Scott
- Travis Flores as Kevin

== Production ==
The film's writer, Michael Carnick, has Muscular Dystrophy, but the film is not strictly autobiographical. Casting for the film was announced in May 2014, with RJ Mitte, Paloma Kwiatkowski, Daphne Zuniga, as well as comedian Ray William Johnson, best known for his Equals Three series, being announced in his first film role. Filming began on May 27, 2014 in Los Angeles, California.

== Release ==
Who's Driving Doug was acquired by Filmbuff in early February 2016 and premiered at the Santa Barbara International Film Festival on February 6, 2016. It will be released in late February.

== Reception ==
Who's Driving Doug received mixed-to-negative reviews. It holds a 20% on Rotten Tomatoes. Tirdad Derakhshani said of the film "Who's Driving Doug, an emotional coming-of-age story about a college student with osteodystrophy, is one of those movies that stacks the decks against critical viewers. If you don't like it, you come off as a heartless misanthrope - especially since its titular star, RJ Mitte, actually suffers from mild cerebral palsy. It's hard to enjoy a film peopled by so many unlikable people."

The Hollywood Reporter gave the film a generally positive review, praising the performances of Mitte, Zuniga, Johnson, with particular praising going toward Johnson, saying "Johnson makes the strongest impression of all. He can be alternately surly and sympathetic, maddening and generous; this is a beautifully nuanced performance." Back To The Movies called it a "A beautiful tale of love, life, responsibility and coping with life when the odds are stacked again you, Who’s Driving Doug is a heart-felt tale that tugs at the heart strings every step of the way."
