= Just Eat It: A Food Waste Story =

- Directed by: Grant Baldwin
- Written by: Jenny Rustemeyer; Grant Baldwin
- Produced by: Jenny Rustemeyer
- Cinematography: Grant Baldwin; Jenny Rustemeyer
- Edited by: Grant Baldwin
- Music by: Grant Baldwin
- Production company: Peg Leg Films
- Distributed by: Knowledge Network
- Release date: April 27, 2014 (Hot Docs)
- Running time: 75 minutes
- Country: Canada
- Language: English

Just Eat It: A Food Waste Story is a Canadian documentary film, directed by Grant Baldwin and released in 2014. The film centres on Baldwin and his partner, producer Jenny Rustemeyer, as they embark on a plan to spend six months living only off discarded food, ultimately learning that up to 40 per cent of all food in North America ends up in the garbage as waste despite being unspoiled and perfectly edible.

The film premiered at the 2014 Hot Docs Canadian International Documentary Festival.

== Awards ==
Award	Year	Category	Recipient	Result	Ref
Hot Docs Canadian International Documentary Festival	2014	Earl A. Glick Emerging Canadian Filmmaker Award	Grant Baldwin	Won	
CPH:DOX	2014	Politiken Audience Award	Grant Baldwin	Won	
Leo Awards	2015	Best Direction in a Documentary Program or Series	Grant Baldwin	Won	
Leo Awards	2015	Best Musical Score in a Documentary Program or Series	Grant Baldwin	Won	
Vancouver Film Critics Circle	2014	Best Canadian Documentary	Grant Baldwin	Nominated	
Vancouver International Film Festival	2014	Impact Award	Grant Baldwin	Won	
Vancouver International Film Festival	2014	#MustSeeBC	Grant Baldwin	Won	
