= Rick Westhead =

Canadian sports correspondent

Rick Westhead (born 1971) is a Canadian sports correspondent, investigative journalist, and author. He previously reported on foreign affairs for the Toronto Star and is known for his investigative journalism, particularly in ice hockey. He has written extensively about sexual assault scandals in sports. He is a senior correspondent for TSN.

== Career ==
Westhead previously worked in New Jersey and New Brunswick.

He began his sports reporting career as a freelancer for The New York Times. He reported on foreign affairs for the Toronto Star and moved overseas. He then accepted a role as a correspondent for TSN. He has criticised the NHL and its lack of care for players like Joe Murphy who suffered from concussions and mental illness and ended up homeless. In 2021, Westhead interviewed Kyle Beach in an exclusive interview for TSN; Beach was a victim of sexual assault when he played for the Chicago Blackhawks.

Westhead received an anonymous tip, which led to the exposure of the sexual assault lawsuit against the victim E.M. and the 2018 Canadian World Junior team. His reporting on the scandal in May 2022 led to the reveal of Hockey Canada's sexual assault settlement fund.

His first book, Finding Murph, explores and criticizes the NHL and its lack of care for players who experience concussions and CTE. In November 2025, his best-selling book We Breed Lions was published. Westhead's writing focuses on analyzing the toxic hockey culture in Canada and the sexual assault trial in 2025. He is donating all proceeds from this book to the Toronto Rape Crisis Centre and other charitable organizations focused on gender-based violence.

We Breed Lions was shortlisted for the Trillium Book Award for English Prose in 2026, and for the 2026 Balsillie Prize for Public Policy. In the same year, Westhead was featured in Code of Misconduct, Sébastien Trahan's documentary film about the Hockey Canada scandal.

Westhead currently works as a senior correspondent for TSN, as well as reporting for CTV.

== Personal life ==
Westhead was born in 1971 in Oakville, Ontario. His mother gave birth to him when she was 15 years old and put him up for adoption. He was adopted into a family with three other siblings; two biological children and another adopted daughter. He met his birth mother for the first time in 1997, and learned that he has three half-siblings.

He is an alumnus of Toronto Metropolitan University, and graduated from the Ryerson School of Journalism in 1995 with a bachelor's degree in journalism. He currently resides in Ontario and regularly plays hockey recreationally in Toronto. Westhead has two sons. One of his sons was diagnosed with lymphoma in 2021.

== Works ==
- Finding Murph: How Joe Murphy Went From Winning a Championship to Living Homeless in the Bush (2020)
- We Breed Lions: Confronting Canada’s Troubled Hockey Culture (2025)

== Awards ==
| Award | Year | Category | Work | Result | Ref |
|---|---|---|---|---|---|
| Canadian Screen Awards | 2016 | Best Sports Feature Segment | "Favela United" with Josh Shiaman, Darren Oliver, Devon Burns, Kevin Fallis | Nominated | |
| Canadian Screen Awards | 2017 | Best Sports Feature Segment | "Radical Play" with Josh Shiaman, Jason Wessel, Darren Oliver, Kevin Fallis | Won | |
| Canadian Screen Awards | 2019 | Best Sports Feature Segment | "Finding Murph" with Josh Shiaman, Stuart Roberts, Devon Burns, Michael Banani | Won | |
| Canadian Screen Awards | 2020 | Best Sports Feature Segment | "Phonzie" with Josh Shiaman, Jason Wessel, Kevin Fallis, Jacob Frenkel | Nominated | |
| Canadian Screen Awards | 2021 | Best Sports Feature Segment | "The Unwanted Visitor" with Josh Shiaman, Michael Banani, Devon Burns, Ken Volden | Nominated | |
| Canadian Screen Awards | 2023 | Best Sports Feature Segment | "Left Behind" with Josh Shiaman, Nigel Akam, Darren Oliver, Michael Banani | Won | |
| Canadian Screen Awards | 2023 | Best Host or Interviewer, News or Information Program or Series | That's Hockey | Nominated | |
| Canadian Screen Awards | 2024 | Best Documentary Program | Broken: The Toxic Culture of Canadian Gymnastics with Ken Volden, Matt Cade, Brett Mitchell, Paul Harrington, Riley Nimens | Won | |
| Trillium Book Award | 2026 | English Prose | We Breed Lions: Confronting Canada’s Troubled Hockey Culture | Pending | |
