= Grant Baldwin =

Canadian documentary film director

Grant Baldwin (born in Brighton, England) is an English–Canadian record producer, cinematographer and documentary filmmaker.

== Life ==
Baldwin was born in England, emigrated to Canada at an early age with his family and grew up in Nanaimo. After being schooled as an audio engineer, Baldwin worked as a composer of film and television music. Today, Baldwin lives in North Vancouver and works as a composer, screenwriter and director of documentary film and television.

== Music ==
Using the pseudonyms Earball and later Phontaine, Baldwin released his own music, mainly of the downtempo und ambient genres. For his music, Baldwin collaborated with the singer Nadia Clark several times, as well as with other singers und musicians.

== Film and TV ==
Together with his wife, producer Jenny Rustemeyer, Baldwin runs the Canadian production company Silvapark Films.

In addition to direction and cinematography, Baldwin is responsible for the film music of the productions. The topics of the documentaries are especially pollution (The Clean Bin Project), food loss and waste (Just Eat It: A Food Waste Story) and the interaction between people and nature (This Mountain Life).

== Discography ==
=== Earball ===
- 2001: aqui

=== Phontaine ===
- 2004: Phontaine
- 2007: Bibliotec
- 2013: Resort

== Filmography ==
- 2010 – The Clean Bin Project
- 2014 – Just Eat It: A Food Waste Story
- 2018 – This Mountain Life
- 2020–24 – Search and Rescue: North Shore (TV series)

== Awards ==
Award	Year	Category	Work	Result	Ref
Canadian Screen Awards	2020	Best Cinematography in a Documentary	This Mountain Life	Nominated	
Hot Docs Canadian International Documentary Festival	2014	Earl A. Glick Emerging Canadian Filmmaker Award	Just Eat It: A Food Waste Story	Won	
Leo Awards	2015	Best Direction in a Documentary Program or Series	Just Eat It: A Food Waste Story	Won	
Leo Awards	2015	Best Musical Score in a Documentary Program or Series	Just Eat It: A Food Waste Story	Won	
Leo Awards	2019	Best Direction in a Feature Length Documentary	This Mountain Life	Won	
Leo Awards	2019	Best Cinematography in a Feature Length Documentary	This Mountain Life	Won	
Leo Awards	2020	Best Cinematography in a Feature Length Documentary	Because We Are Girls	Nominated	
Leo Awards	2021	Best Direction in a Documentary Series	Search and Rescue: North Shore	Won	
Leo Awards	2021	Best Musical Score in a Documentary Series	Search and Rescue: North Shore with Stephen Fuller	Won	
Leo Awards	2021	Best Cinematography in a Documentary Series	Search and Rescue: North Shore with Ian Christie	Nominated	
Leo Awards	2024	Best Musical Score in a Feature Length Documentary	Subterranean with Stephen Fuller	Won	
Leo Awards	2025	Best Direction in a Documentary Series	Search and Rescue: North Shore	Nominated	
Leo Awards	2025	Best Cinematography in a Documentary Series	Search and Rescue: North Shore with Ian Christie	Nominated	
Vancouver Film Critics Circle	2014	Best Canadian Documentary	Just Eat It: A Food Waste Story	Nominated	
Vancouver Film Critics Circle	2018	Best British Columbia Film	This Mountain Life	Nominated	
Vancouver International Film Festival	2014	Impact Award	Just Eat It: A Food Waste Story	Won	
Vancouver International Film Festival	2014	#MustSeeBC	Just Eat It: A Food Waste Story	Won	
