= Ray William Johnson =

American YouTuber (born 1981)

- Born: August 14, 1981 (age 45); Oklahoma City, Oklahoma, U.S.
- Education: Columbia University School of General Studies
- Occupations: Internet personality; actor; comedian; filmmaker; rapper; singer; musician
- Spouse: Kelly Farrell (m. 2022)

YouTube information
- Channels: Ray William Johnson; Your Favorite Martian
- Years active: 2008–present
- Subscribers: 18.6 million (Ray William Johnson); 4.03 million (Your Favorite Martian)
- Views: 14.9 billion (Ray William Johnson); 1.13 billion (Your Favorite Martian)
- Musical career
- Genres: hip hop; pop; comedy
- Member of: Your Favorite Martian
- Formerly of: Fatty Spins; Fat Damon; The Upside Downs
- Last updated: November 19, 2026

Ray William Johnson (born August 14, 1981) is an American internet personality, comedian, actor, and singer-songwriter best known for his eponymous YouTube channel and his web series on that channel, Equals Three. From 2011 to 2013, his channel was the most-subscribed YouTube channel, during which it also became the first channel to reach 5 million subscribers. In 2013, the channel surpassed 10 million subscribers and had over 2 billion views, making it one of the most watched and subscribed to channels at the time. Johnson left the series in March 2014 but continued to produce it and other web series like Booze Lightyear, Comedians On, and Top 6, the first two of which were later cancelled. In the 2020s, he has since transitioned to sharing true crime stories, primarily on TikTok, Facebook and Instagram.

Johnson, along with Jesse Cale, was a founding member of Your Favorite Martian, an internet cartoon band, in which he also provided vocals as Puff Puff. As of December 2025, it has 3.81 million subscribers on YouTube and 296,547 monthly listeners on Spotify. Starting in early 2011, the band released 60 songs. After an over decade long hiatus their most recent song, "Real Girl", was uploaded on May 8, 2024. The band is known for edgy lyrics, with "Orphan Tears", "Stalkin' Your Mom", "Whip Your Kids", "Transphobic Techno", and "Tig Ol' Bitties" being songs in their discography.

Johnson has also delved into writing and acting. His first scripted web series, Riley Rewind, premiered on Facebook in 2013. He created a television concept that was purchased by FX the same year. He made his live-action acting debut in the indie road film Who's Driving Doug. In 2015 his production company, Mom & Pop Empire, was reported to be co-producing a documentary with Supergravity Pictures about monopolies in the cable television industry.

== Early life and education ==
Johnson was born on August 14, 1981, and raised in Oklahoma City, Oklahoma. He has claimed he is Native American. His parents separated when he was a child. When he was around 13 years old, Johnson ran away from home to live with his father for a few months. He described him as alcoholic and physically abusive and claimed he had used Johnson’s college savings bank account. As such, he remained estranged from him until his death in 2014. Johnson attended Norman North High School, where he graduated in 1999. He later attended the Columbia University School of General Studies, where he studied history, but did not graduate.

== Career ==
=== Equals Three ===
Johnson began posting videos to his "Ray William Johnson" channel in April 2009. In 2011, the channel became YouTube's first to reach five million subscribers. The channel had also attained nearly two billion total views. Originally, Johnson produced videos out of his New York City apartment, but, in 2011, he signed a deal with Maker Studios to produce videos on set in Culver City, California. While at Maker Studios, Johnson produced a Spanish-language version of the series, Igual a Tres, and also produced a series of comedic animated music videos on a side channel called Your Favorite Martian.

In October 2012, Johnson announced that he would be leaving Maker Studios, contending that they had been pressuring him to sign a new contract that limited his access to his AdSense account and would reportedly take 40% of his earnings from the series. The contract also would have required Johnson to give up 50% of his intellectual property rights to the show and his other animated web project, Your Favorite Martian. In November 2012, Johnson founded his own production studio, Equals Three Studios (then known as Runaway Planet), and continued producing Equals Three. Your Favorite Martian series was ended that same month due to his dispute with Maker Studios.

In December 2013, Johnson announced that he would be ending Equals Three in the near future to focus on other projects. His last show as host (titled "THANK YOU FOR EVERYTHING") was published on March 12, 2014, and was around 14 minutes long. The channel had over 10 million subscribers and 2.6 billion total views at the time of Johnson's departure. The show returned in July 2014 with Robby Motz as host. Motz would depart in July 2015, at which point Kaja Martin, one of Johnson's frequent collaborators, took over as host, but Martin was subsequently replaced by Carlos Santos in December 2015.

In 2015, Johnson sued Jukin Media for requesting the removal of 40 Equals Three videos which sampled their content. The case was later settled.

The series featured numerous celebrity guests, including Robin Williams, Sarah Silverman, Gabriel Iglesias, John Cho, and Jason Biggs.

=== Scripted series ===
In December 2013, Johnson debuted his first scripted series, Riley Rewind, which was originally released on Facebook before migrating to YouTube. The series revolved around a teenager with a special time-shifting power. It was released in 5 parts and cumulatively totaled about 50 minutes. In 2015, Johnson reported the series had received 10 million views on Facebook.

Earlier in 2013, Johnson was in talks with FX Networks about a scripted series based on his life. The network gave Johnson a script commitment. The script was to be written by Mike Gagerman and Andrew Waller.

=== Other "Ray William Johnson" content ===
Since his departure from Equals Three, Johnson has continued producing comedic series for his main "Ray William Johnson" channel. These series included Booze Lightyear, Top 6, and Comedians On. Booze Lightyear was a scripted sketch comedy web series that featured a variety of different actors often in comedic situations. Johnson appeared on the series' first episode in February 2015. Top 6 is "list show" that is written and hosted by Kelly Landry and discusses 6 items about a given topic each episode. Top 6 also premiered in February 2015. Comedians On premiered in July 2015 and featured a collection of different comedians humorously discussing a chosen topic with Carlos Santos as host. "Comedians On" along with "Booze Lightyear" were eventually cancelled at roughly the same time that Carlos Santos became host of "Equals Three". All of these shows (including Equals Three itself) are produced by Equals Three Studios. Johnson occasionally appears in these shows and in "update vlogs" on the channel.

=== Music, acting, and film production ===
Johnson was attached to an indie film project entitled Who's Driving Doug in May 2014. He was cast in a role as a new driver for a disabled recluse played by former Breaking Bad star, RJ Mitte. The film was written by Michael Carnick, who uses a wheelchair as the result of a rare disorder, and also stars Paloma Kwiatkowski. Who's Driving Doug was released in February 2016. Johnson previously had a small part in Jay & Silent Bob's Super Groovy Cartoon Movie. He appeared in a series of advertisements for DiGiorno pizzas in January 2016, alongside Colleen Ballinger, DeStorm Power, and American football player Clay Matthews III.

Johnson is also the co-creator (with former Equals Three host, Kaja Martin) of the film production company, Mom & Pop Empire. They are currently working on a documentary project seeking to expose cable monopolies. Johnson and Martin are co-producers along with Max Benator and Marc Hustvedt's Supergravity Pictures. Johnson is expected to narrate the film. Mom & Pop Empire had previously co-produced a film called Manson Family Vacation with Mark and Jay Duplass. The film premiered at South by Southwest in 2015 and its distribution rights were purchased by Netflix soon after. Johnson and Martin are also working on a separate film starring Johnson and a long-form movie version of their web series Booze Lightyear as part of Mom & Pop Empire.

In the musical sphere, Johnson released an album titled Fat Damon in 2018, which featured three tracks: "Conspiracy Theory Guy (ft. Wax)", "My Life Is Dope", and "Fred Astaire". Additionally, he formed a virtual band named The Upside Downs, although the timeline of their releases is not specified.

=== Recent work and true crime stories ===
In 2020, Johnson returned to YouTube after a yearlong hiatus with a new series called Svperhvman. He also revived his side project "Your Favorite Martian" releasing a new video called "Orphan Tears Part 2", the first in over ten years. He has since transitioned to sharing mostly true crime stories on social media in a short-form content format, which has been particularly successful on TikTok, Instagram, and Facebook.

== Personal life ==
Johnson was previously in a relationship with YouTuber and actress Anna Akana until 2014. The couple co-hosted the podcast Runaway Thoughts and collaborated on the 2013 web series Riley Rewind. In a 2015 interview with Rhett and Link, Akana attributed their breakup partly to an imbalance in their professional and financial standing.

Johnson married Kelly Farrell in May 2022 after almost six years of dating. Johnson has stated in multiple videos that he does not plan on having children and gotten a vasectomy. Johnson has been open about his struggle with depression and credits his estranged father’s death on his journey to self improvement.

== Filmography ==
Year	Title	Role	Notes
2009–2014	Equals Three	Host as himself (until 2014)	Also creator and executive producer, formerly writer
2010	The Professionals	Stan	Episode: "Special Request"
2010	Annoying Orange	Crabapple	Episode: "Crabapple"
2010–2011	Breaking NYC	Himself	66 episodes
2011–2012	Breaking Los Angeles	Himself	8 episodes
2011–2012	Your Favorite Martian: The Animated Series	Puff (voice)	11 episodes
2012	RVC: The Lone Shopping Network	Derek	
2013	Jay & Silent Bob's Super Groovy Cartoon Movie	Quick Stop Hipster (voice)	
2013	Riley Rewind	Mr. Osborne	Also creator, director, writer, and executive producer
2013–2014	Epic Rap Battles of History	Goku / Boba Fett	2 episodes
2014	The Fluffy Movie	Nurse	
2015	Manson Family Vacation		Executive producer
2015	Booze Lightyear	Booze Player	Also creator, writer, and executive producer
2015	Comedians On	Himself	Also creator and executive producer
2015	Top 6		Executive producer
2016	Who's Driving Doug	Scott	
2016	We Love You	Derrick	

== Discography ==
Fatty Spins
Year	Name
2009	"Doin' Your Mom"
2009	"Fresh Prince" (cover)
2010	"YouTube Party"
2010	"Muppet Sex"
2010	"Apple Store Love Song"
2010	"School'd"
2010	"(untitled gangsta song)"

Your Favorite Martian
Year	Name
2011	"My Balls"
2011	"Zombie Love Song"
2011	"Bottles of Beer"
2011	"Club Villain"
2011	"The Stereotypes Song"
2011	"The Unofficial Smithers Love Song"
2011	"Orphan Tears Part 1" (Note: features vocals from Wax)
2011	"Mr. Douchebag"
2011	"Transphobic Techno (Bitch Got a Penis)"
2011	"Grandma Got a Facebook"
2011	"Tig Ol' Bitties"
2011	"Fight to Win" (Note: features vocals from DeStorm Power)
2011	"Stalkin' Your Mom" (Note: features vocals from Wax)
2011	"Robot Bar Fight"
2011	"8-Bit World" (Note: features vocals from Hoodie Allen)
2011	"Puppet Break-Up" (Note: music video directed by Sam Macaroni)
2011	"Whip Your Kids" (Note: features vocals from Nice Peter)
2011	"Booty Store"
2011	"Nerd Rage"
2011	"Epileptic Techno"
2011	"Dookie Fresh"
2011	"Santa Hates Poor Kids"
2011	"Shitty G"
2012	"Friend Zone"
2012	"She Looks Like Sex (Remix)" (Note: features Mike Posner)
2012	"We Like Them Girls" (Note: music video directed by ForrestFire101)
2012	"Alien"
2012	"White Boy Wasted" (Note: features vocals from Dumbfoundead)
2012	"Complicated"
2012	"Take Over The World"
2012	"Text Me Back"
2012	"Jupiter"
2012	"Just a Friend" (Biz Markie cover)
2012	"Somebody That I Used to Know" (Gotye cover)
2012	"Fight for Your Right" (Beastie Boys cover)
2012	"Love the Way You Lie" (Eminem and Rihanna cover)
2012	"Road Rage"
2012	"My Balls" (Alt rock cover)
2012	"Alien (Unplugged)"
2012	"Jump Around" (House of Pain cover)
2012	"Bartender Song" (Rehab cover)
2012	"High Voltage" (Linkin Park cover)
2012	"Boom Headshot"
2022	"Orphan Tears Part 2" (feat. Cartoon Wax and Stevi the Demon)
2022	"Orphan Tears Part 3" (feat. Cartoon Wax and Stevi the Demon)
2022	"Verified"
2022	"Uno Reverse" (feat. Cartoon Wax)
2022	"Eff This Job" (feat. Cartoon Wax)
2022	"Brain Rave" (feat. Stevi the Demon)
2022	"This Is Why I'm Single" (feat. Shuba and Cartoon Wax)
2022	"Rich People" (feat. Cartoon Wax)
2023	"Gentleman's Ballad"
2023	"Everyone Clapped" (feat. Cartoon Wax)
2023	"Date Myself"
2023	"Damn I'm Ugly" (feat. Billy Marchiafava)
2023	"Telescope" (feat. Stevi the Demon)
2023	"Iamverybadazz"
2023	"The Trauma Song"
2023	"Algorithm God"
2024	"Real Girl"

Fat Damon
Year	Name
2018	"Conspiracy Theory Guy" (feat. Wax)
2018	"Fred Astaire"
2018	"My Life is Dope"

The Upside Downs
Year	Name
2018	"Fred Astaire 1"
2018	"Everything is Bullshit 2"
2020	"BANG! 3"
2020	"Wolverine 4"
2020	"I'm Speaking 5"
2020	"Pixar Mom 6"
2021	"You Keep Me Hangin' On 7"
2021	"Ugly 8"
2021	"Baby Yoda 9"
2021	"Brain Stew 10"
2021	"Silent Mode 11"
2021	"Let's Do Drugs 12"
2021	"Yellow 13"
2021	"Heartcatchthump 14"
2021	"Kung Fu in the Afterlife 15"
2021	"Stupid World 16"
2022	"Everything is Bullshit 2" (Evolved Version)

== Recognition and awards ==
Variety magazine called Johnson's scripted web series, Riley Rewind, the 7th best web series of 2013. Johnson was also listed among The Hollywood Reporter's "Comedy Class of 2013." French YouTubers Antoine Daniel and Mathieu Sommet have cited Johnson's Equals Three as their inspiration, respectively for What The Cut !? and Salut les Geeks !.

Achievements
Preceded by nigahiga	Most Subscribed Channel on YouTube; 2011–2013	Succeeded by Smosh
