= Broom Factory =

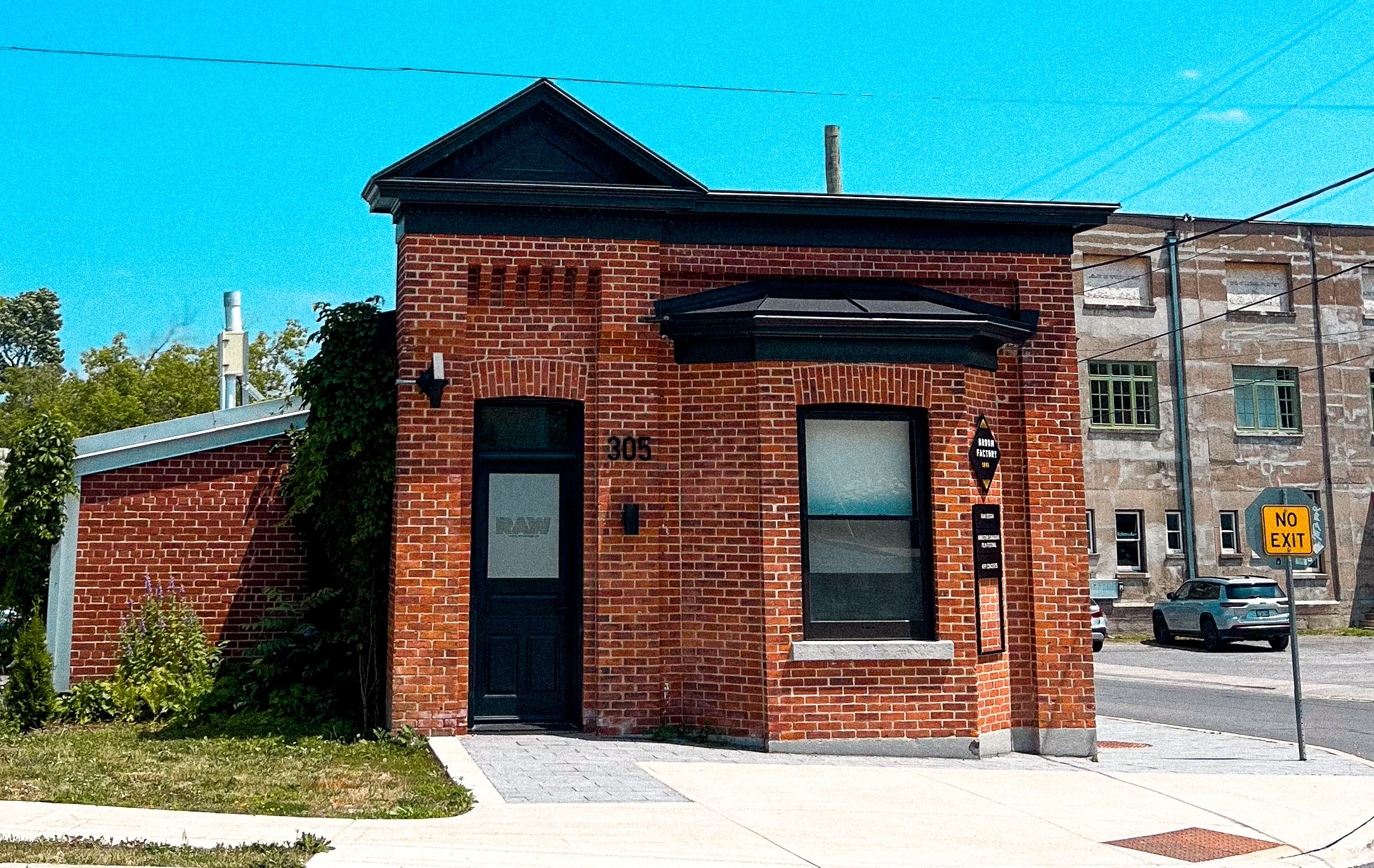
- Broom Factory front view
- Interactive map of the Broom Factory area

General information
- Location: 305 Rideau St., Kingston, Ontario, Canada
- Coordinates: 44°14′31″N 76°28′59″W
- Completed: 1894

Website
- broomfactory.ca

The Broom Factory is a renovated heritage building in the Inner Harbour neighbourhood of Kingston, Ontario, Canada. Constructed in 1894, it originally served as the factory of a broom company, and continued to be used by manufacturing or industrial businesses until the 1990s. After being abandoned for a time, the building was bought by the city, designated a heritage property in 2015, and bought by RAW Design in 2016, an architecture firm who remain the building's current owners.

In the present day, the building functions as a local hub, "serving film, music, design, and the broader arts in general." The building hosts live music, film screenings, workshops, and other community programming. It is fully accessible, all-ages, and environmentally conscious in its design, with a mission to create a safe and welcoming space for everyone.

The building is operated in partnership with the Kingston Canadian Film Festival (KCFF), and KPP Concerts. Both RAW and KCFF now use the building during the day as office space.

The building is one block from the river, beside the route of the Hanley Spur, and sits on the same street as the National Grocers’ Building (a hub for studios and small business) and the Woolen Mill (housing offices, restaurants, clinics, a spa etc.).

== Facilities and features ==
The Broom Factory has a permanent stage measuring 17 ft (5.2 m) long, 15 ft (4.6 m) wide, and 2 ft (0.6 m) high. Behind the stage, two conference rooms are available, which function as green room facilities. It is available for events and programming after 4 p.m. and is licensed to serve alcohol; able to serve drinks, coffee and snacks when events are held.

The Broom Factory includes a range of modular equipment intended to support flexible event setups and efficient transitions between uses. These include lighting systems, a projector and blackout blinds, a sound system and mixing console, and a variety of microphones and DI boxes

=== Accessibility, inclusivity, and sustainability ===
The Broom factory is designed and run with inclusivity and sustainability in mind. It has non-gendered washrooms, one of which is wheelchair accessible. Events are open to all ages, and encouraged to end early to "maximize inclusion, accessibility, and artist health." The Broom Factory includes a land acknowledgment in its communications and on-site materials.

The building itself is net-zero ready, eco-friendly and non-reliant on fossil fuels. To support sustainable transportation, the venue also provides a bike lock station.

== Previous performers ==
The Broom Factory has hosted a variety of artists across music, comedy, and spoken word, including:

- Charlie Kaufman, a screenwriter and director known for writing Being John Malkovich and Eternal Sunshine of the Spotless Mind
- Kevin McDonald and Bruce McCulloch from The Kids in the Hall
- Gord Sinclair, the bassist for the Canadian band The Hip (The Tragically Hip)
- Protest the Hero, a Canadian progressive metal band
- Propagandhi a Canadian punk band
- Shayne Koyczan, a spoken word poet and writer
- Virginia to Vegas, a Canadian singer-songwriter
- Ria Mae, a Canadian singer-songwriter
- Donovan Woods, a Canadian singer-songwriter
- Whitehorse, a Canadian folk-rock duo
- Dizzy, an indie pop band
- Snotty Nose Rez Kids, an Indigenous Canadian hip-hop duo

== History ==
=== The Bailey Broom Factory ===
The building, a red-brick industrial warehouse, was constructed in 1894 by the Imperial Oil Company. William Bailey, who had been manufacturing brooms since the late 1850s, relocated his company, "W.B. Broom Co." from 299 Queen Street to the new site some time between 1896 and 1903. Together with his son, Samuel R. Bailey, and associates William J. Lee and John M. Hughes, he established the new factory, rebranding to "the Bailey Broom Company".

A 1956 account reports that a Bailey factory burned to the ground on July 22, 1903. There has been speculation that this may have been the 299 location, fueling the move, though this has not been proven.

In approximately 1905, William Bailey engaged Newlands and Son, esteemed architects based in Kingston, to design an office addition at the front of the building. A concrete warehouse running north–south was also constructed between 1904 and 1911.

Reports vary on the number of employees working in the factory and numbers of their "universal cleaner brooms" produced, but numbers are somewhere between 40 and 55 employees, producing an average of 140 to 157 dozen brooms a day.

=== Successive ownership ===
After the business closed in 1923, the property was sold to a subsidiary of the Imperial Oil Company, either British-American Oil Co. or the Queen City Oil Company, who resold to Quintal & England roofing in 1959. The firm stopped operation in 1994, at which point Rosen Fuels used the building for storage and abandoned it at some point in the next decade.

On April 15, 2014, the City of Kingston bought the building in a lot sale including 305 to 323 Rideau st., with the condition that the factory was demolished by August 15 of the same year. The city had intended to improve the look of the area and make way for the since-cancelled “Wellington Street Extension,” which would have had an arterial road cut through Douglas Fluhrer Park.

=== Protests and re-sale ===
On June 17, 2014, the neighbors who owned a business across the road, Michael and John Sinclair, heard of the demolition plan and spread word. Hundreds of letters were sent to the city opposing the demolition, and a protest was held outside of City Hall.

Community heritage experts, including Laura Murray of the Swamp Ward and Inner Harbour History Project, advocated against the demolition, citing the lack of attention and restoration efforts to industrial heritage buildings or heritage buildings north of Princess Street. The association with Newlands and Son was also drawn on to emphasize importance of the history of the building.

On June 30, 2014, Kingston City Council voted to stop demolition, and sold it to Toronto-based architecture firm RAW Design in 2016. According to Jon Jeremonis, a representative and architect of the firm, they received many calls and emails expressing both gratitude and interest in the restoration process during construction.

=== Renovations ===
From purchase, RAW Design had intended for the building to become the firm's Eastern Ontario branch office, as well as a café and community hub. A proposal for nine residential townhouses beside the building was later halted due to the extensive soil remediation that would have been required.

The building was extensively restored, and portions restabilized. The original building and the Newlands & Sons addition were left largely unaltered, while the structurally unstable concrete and warehouse additions were demolished. The former warehouse footprint was repurposed as a bike parking and waste storage area.

Careful restoration was carried out on the original brickwork, wood detailing, and windows, using historically appropriate techniques for the masonry, while modern materials were incorporated into the new windows. Key elevations were reconstructed or repaired to reflect the historic design while supporting contemporary use.

Sustainability upgrades, such as improved insulation and energy-efficient systems, were also incorporated. By 2021, the offices were in use. The space was featured in the January/February 2023 Kingston Life spotlight.
