= The Boy From Geita =

Tanzanian documentary film

- Directed by: Vic Sarin
- Written by: Vic Sarin; Simon Rieber
- Screenplay by: Vic Sarin
- Produced by: Tina Pehme; Kim Roberts
- Starring: Peter Ash; Adam; Adam Robert
- Release date: 25 April 2014
- Running time: 1h 19m
- Countries: Tanzania; Canada
- Languages: English; Kiswahili

The Boy From Geita is a 2014 documentary film directed by Vic Sarin that tells the story of Adam, a young boy from Geita, Tanzania, who suffers abuse due to superstitions surrounding albinism. The film explores the challenges faced by people with albinism in Africa, particularly in Tanzania, where some believe their body parts hold mystical powers.

== Synopsis ==
The film follows Adam, a young boy with albinism, who faces physical and psychological abuse from his community. He meets Peter Ash, a Canadian man with albinism, who travels to Tanzania to help raise awareness about the rights of people with albinism. Together they confront social and cultural challenges while finding hope through their solidarity and educational efforts.

== Cast ==
- Peter Ash
- Adam
- Adam Robert

== Awards ==
- 2014 Screened at the 2014 Vancouver International Film Festival
- 2015 Nominated for the DGC Allan King Award for Best Documentary Film
