= Skoden =

#skoden
- Directed by: Damien Eagle Bear
- Written by: Damien Eagle Bear
- Produced by: Damien Eagle Bear
- Starring: Pernell Bad Arm
- Cinematography: Tamarra Canu
- Edited by: Billy Calling First; Jasleen Kaur; Kane Stewart
- Music by: Melody McKiver
- Production company: Dirty Jacket Productions
- Release date: May 1, 2025 (Hot Docs)
- Running time: 76 minutes
- Country: Canada
- Language: English

#skoden is a Canadian documentary film, directed by Damien Eagle Bear and released in 2025. The film is a portrait of Pernell Bad Arm, a homeless Kainai man in Lethbridge, Alberta, who attained viral internet fame in the 2010s when an image of him confronting a photographer briefly became an anti-indigenous racist meme, before being reclaimed by indigenous youth as a symbol of pride and resistance.

In an essay for CBC Arts, Eagle Bear explained his desire to help flesh out and expand the understanding of a man who was known to the general public more as a symbol than as a real person.

The film premiered in the Canadian Spectrum competition at the 2025 Hot Docs Canadian International Documentary Festival, where Damien Eagle Bear won the Earl A. Glick Emerging Canadian Filmmaker Award.
