= First We Eat =

Award winning Canadian documentary film

- Film poster
- Directed by: Suzanne Crocker
- Written by: Suzanne Crocker
- Produced by: Suzanne Crocker
- Cinematography: Suzanne Crocker
- Edited by: Michael Brockington; Caroline Christie; Astrid Schau-Larsen
- Music by: Corb Lund; Alex Houghton; Jesse Cooke; Marieke Hiensch; Andrew Laviolette
- Production company: Drift Productions
- Release date: May 28, 2020 (Hot Docs)
- Running time: 101 minutes
- Country: Canada
- Language: English

First We Eat is a Canadian documentary film, directed by Suzanne Crocker and released in 2020. The film documents the attempts of Crocker and her family, after a landslide temporarily blocked highway access to their hometown of Dawson City, Yukon, to spend a full year exclusively consuming food that had been hunted, fished, gathered, grown or raised locally, while carefully considering the environmental and social impacts of modern commercial transport of food. The documentary film premiered on May 28, 2020 on Hot Docs.

== Production ==
Crocker first announced the project in 2017. The film's production website also incorporates an ongoing collaborative project on food security, including guides to foraging for edible wild plants, a seed guide to fruits and vegetables that grow well in Yukon, and a recipe guide to dishes that can be cooked with local ingredients available in the Dawson City area.

== Release ==
The film premiered as part of the 2020 Hot Docs Canadian International Documentary Festival. Due to the COVID-19 pandemic in Canada it was not screened theatrically, but premiered as part of the festival's online streaming component. It was named one of five winners of the festival's Rogers Audience Award, alongside the films The Walrus and the Whistleblower, 9/11 Kids, The Forbidden Reel and There's No Place Like This Place, Anyplace.

It was opening film at 18th EBS International Documentary Film Festival held from 23 to 28 August 2021 in Seoul, South Korea. It was screened on August 23, 2021.
