= Cocaine, Prison & Likes: Isabelle's True Story =

Canadian television documentary series

Cocaine, Prison & Likes: Isabelle's True Story (French: Cocaïne, prison & likes : la vraie histoire d'Isabelle) is a Canadian documentary television series that premiered in 2022 on Crave. The film profiles Isabelle Lagacé, a Canadian woman who spent several years in prison in Australia after being caught on a cruise ship in 2016 with more than 30 kilograms of cocaine hidden in her room.

Lagacé and her friend and travel companion Mélina Roberge, who was also arrested and imprisoned, were recruited into the scheme by a professional drug smuggler, and agreed to participate because the cruise offered them an opportunity to build their brands as social media influencers by posting glamorous content from around the world.

Roberge did not participate in the film, instead telling her version of the story in her book Sans filtre, which was published earlier in 2022.

Produced by Urbania and Connect3 and directed by Sébastien Trahan, the series production was announced in July 2022. The series was released in both English and French versions, premiering on Crave in December 2022.

The series received a Canadian Screen Award nomination for Best Factual Series at the 12th Canadian Screen Awards in 2024.
