= Wuthering High School =

- Screenplay by: Delondra Williams
- Directed by: Anthony DiBlasi
- Starring: Francesca Eastwood; Paloma Kwiatkowski; James Caan
- Theme music composer: Chris Ridenhour
- Country of origin: United States
- Original language: English

Production
- Producer: David Michael Latt
- Cinematography: Scott Winig
- Editor: Ana Florit
- Running time: 88 minutes

Original release
- Network: Lifetime
- Release: March 14, 2015

Wuthering High School is a 2015 American made-for-television drama film directed by Anthony DiBlasi and starring Francesca Eastwood, Paloma Kwiatkowski and James Caan.

It is a modern retelling of Emily Brontë's 1847 novel, Wuthering Heights.

== Plot ==
Cathy and Heath were friends as children, and engage in a wild and destructive relationship as teenagers.

== Cast ==
- Paloma Kwiatkowski as Cathy Earnshaw
- Andrew Jacobs as Heath
- Matthew Boehm as Eddie Linton
- James Caan as Mr. Earnshaw
- Francesca Eastwood as Ellen

== Reception ==
Emily Ashby of Common Sense Media gave the film two stars out of five. Caitlin Gallagher of Bustle magazine notes "The sunniness of California doesn't match the original novel's moodiness (and broodiness) of the moors in northern England..." but observes that the main characters remain unlikeable, as in the novel.
