= The Price We Pay (2014 film) =

- Directed by: Harold Crooks
- Written by: Harold Crooks; Brigitte Alepin
- Based on: La Crise fiscale qui vient by Brigitte Alepin
- Produced by: Nathalie Barton
- Production company: InformAction
- Distributed by: Filmoption; Cinemaflix
- Release date: September 5, 2014 (TIFF)
- Running time: 93 minutes
- Country: Canada
- Language: English

The Price We Pay is a 2014 Canadian documentary film. It premiered at the 2014 Toronto International Film Festival. Directed by Harold Crooks and based on Brigitte Alepin's book La Crise fiscale qui vient, the film profiles the use of tax havens by large corporations as a dodge from having to pay corporate taxes.

The film was named to TIFF's annual Top Ten Canadian Films list, and had its general theatrical release in 2015.

The film received a Canadian Screen Award nomination for Best Editing in a Documentary at the 4th Canadian Screen Awards, and a Quebec Cinema nomination for Best Documentary Film at the 18th Quebec Cinema Awards. It won the Vancouver Film Critics Circle award for Best Canadian Documentary at the Vancouver Film Critics Circle Awards 2014.
