= Code of Misconduct =

2026 Canadian documentary film

- Directed by: Sébastien Trahan
- Written by: Sébastien Trahan; Laurel Baker
- Produced by: Annie Bourdeau
- Starring: Rick Westhead
- Cinematography: Laurence Turcotte-Fraser
- Edited by: Olivier Gilbert; Philippe Gariépy
- Production company: Urbania
- Distributed by: Cineflix Media
- Release date: April 26, 2026 (Hot Docs)
- Running time: 88 minutes
- Country: Canada
- Language: English

Code of Misconduct is a Canadian documentary film, directed by Sébastien Trahan and released in 2026. Featuring investigative journalist Rick Westhead, the film profiles the Hockey Canada sexual assault scandal, in which five junior ice hockey players were charged with sexual assault in 2018, leading to allegations that Hockey Canada, the sport's governing body in Canada, had participated in helping to cover up the incident.

The film premiered on April 26, 2026, at the Hot Docs Canadian International Documentary Festival, where the feature film was nominated for the Bill Nemtin Award for Best Social Impact Documentary. At the same event, director Sébastien Trahan won the Earl A. Glick Emerging Canadian Filmmaker Award.

Following its Hot Docs premiere, the film was broadcast on Super Channel on May 8.
