= The Vancouver Asahi =

- Poster
- バンクーバーの朝日
- Directed by: Yuya Ishii
- Screenplay by: Satoko Okudera
- Produced by: Naoto Inaba; Miyoshi Kikuchi
- Starring: Satoshi Tsumabuki; Kazuya Kamenashi; Ryō Katsuji; Yusuke Kamiji; Sosuke Ikematsu; Kōichi Satō
- Cinematography: Ryuto Kondo
- Edited by: Shinichi Fushima
- Music by: Takashi Watanabe
- Distributed by: Toho
- Release date: September 29, 2014
- Running time: 133 minutes
- Countries: Japan; Canada
- Language: Japanese
- Box office: ¥882 million (Japan)

The Vancouver Asahi (Japanese: バンクーバーの朝日, Hepburn: Bankūbā no Asahi) is a 2014 Japanese-Canadian co-produced baseball drama film directed by Yuya Ishii, based on the true story of a Vancouver-based baseball team called the Vancouver Asahi which existed before the Second World War. It was released to Japanese theaters on December 20.

== Plot ==
The film is set in Canada during the 1930s.

== Cast ==
- Satoshi Tsumabuki as Reggie Kasahara
- Kazuya Kamenashi as Roy Naganishi
- Ryō Katsuji as Kei Kitamoto
- Yusuke Kamiji as Tom Miyake
- Sosuke Ikematsu as Frank Nojima
- Kōichi Satō as Seiji Kasahara
- Mitsuki Takahata as Emmy Kasahara

== Reception ==
The film has grossed ¥882 million at the Japanese box office.

The film was screened at the 2014 Vancouver International Film Festival, where it won the People's Choice Award as the most popular film at the festival.

== See also ==
- Asahi (baseball team)
- List of baseball films
- Japanese Canadians
