= Earl A. Glick Emerging Canadian Filmmaker Award =

Canadian film award

The Earl A. Glick Emerging Canadian Filmmaker Award is a Canadian film award, presented annually at the Hot Docs Canadian International Documentary Festival to honour works by emerging Canadian documentary filmmakers. Directors who are screening their first or second films in the festival program are eligible for the award, which includes a $3,000 prize endowed by the estate of Canadian film producer Earl A. Glick.

The award was presented for the first time in 2013. Prior to that year, Canadian and international emerging filmmakers were eligible for a single Emerging Artist award. From 2013 until 2021, the award was presented as Emerging Canadian Filmmaker, with Glick's name being added in 2022.

== Winners ==
Year	Director	Film	Ref
2013	Nicolas Renaud	Brave New River (La nouvelle rupert)	
2014	Grant Baldwin	Just Eat It: A Food Waste Story	
2015	Ryan Mullins	Chameleon	
2016	Aude Leroux-Lévesque, Sébastien Rist	Living With Giants (Chez les géants)	
2017	François Jacob	A Moon of Nickel and Ice (Sur la lune de nickel)	
2018	Michael Del Monte	Transformer	
2019	Emily Gan	Cavebirds	
2020	Ying Wang	The World Is Bright	
2021	Elle-Máijá Tailfeathers	Kímmapiiyipitssini: The Meaning of Empathy	
2022	Jacquelyn Mills	Geographies of Solitude	
2023	Dominique Chaumont	Veranada	
2024	Laurence Lévesque	Okurimono	
2025	Damien Eagle Bear	Skoden	
2026	Sébastien Trahan	Code of Misconduct	
