= TaxCOOP =

TaxCOOP is a non-profit Canadian policy institute dedicated to international tax competition and cooperation, independent and defending no political, partisan or national interests. Its head office is located in Montreal, in the province of Quebec, Canada.

TaxCOOP hosts annual conferences and publishes works, including the book Winning the Tax Wars (2017) and Coordination and Cooperation: Tax Policy in the 21st Century (2021). Several TaxCOOP conferences have been set up in collaboration with international organizations, notably the World Bank, the United Nations, and the International Economic Forum of the Americas. In 2017, TaxCOOP was selected among the fifty most influential tax organizations and personalities in the world by the English magazine, International Tax Review.

== History ==
TaxCOOP was set up in 2015 to promote a neutral global discussion on the subject of international tax competition, an issue that was not being addressed by global tax reform. TaxCOOP was founded by Brigitte Alepin, UQO professor, tax specialist and author, Allisson Christians, Full Professor, Associate Dean of Research at the Faculty of Law of McGill University and Holder of the H. Hewad Stikeman Research Chair in Tax Law, Lyne Latulippe, Ph.D, Associate Professor and Principal Researcher at the Research Chair in Taxation and Public Finance at the University of Sherbrooke, and the Honorable Louise Otis, international administrative judge, president of the administrative tribunal of the OECD and adjunct professor at McGill University.

== History of the TaxCOOP Conferences ==
In 2015, the TaxCOOP2015 conference was presented in Montreal at the Museum of Fine Arts. The objective of the non-partisan event was to raise awareness and stimulate reflection on the tax breaks granted by states to attract or retain investors. In 2016, the TaxCOOP2016 conference dedicated to developing countries was presented at the World Bank in Washington. In 2017, the TaxCOOP2017 conference was presented at the Palace of Nations in Geneva. In 2018, the TaxCOOP2018 conference was presented at the OECD headquarters at the Paris conference organized by the International Economic Forum of the Americas. In 2019, TaxCOOP presented New Tools for an Environmental Tax System at COP25, in Madrid. In 2020, the organization conducted the World Tax Summit, TaxCOOP2020, which took place in a virtual format. In 2021, their last event, Propelling A New Era of Tax Cooperation, was broadcast live from Montreal.

== Nominations ==
GLOBAL TAX 50, International Tax Review In 2017, TaxCOOP appears in the GLOBAL TAX 50 list of the International Tax Review magazine.

== Publications ==
Winning the Tax War: Tax Competition and Cooperation 2016. Winning the Tax Wars : Tax Competition and Cooperation. Dir. Brigitte Alepin, Blanca Moreno-Dodson, and Louise Otis. Series on International Taxation: Wolters Kluwer.

TaxCOOP: A Vision for Inclusivity in Global Tax Governance Publication of the article, TaxCOOP: A Vision for Inclusivity in Global Tax Governance, in International Tax Review in 2017.

10 years after the crisis, where are we in International Tax Reform? Publication of the interview conducted with Pascal Saint-Amans at TaxCOOP2018 in the periodicals RFFP, and Regard CFFP.

Coordination and Cooperation : Tax Policy in the 21st Century. 2021. Dir. Alepin, B., Latulippe, L., and Otis, L. Series on International Taxation: Wolters Kluwer.

== Picture of the global tax AGORA ==
Study carried out by TaxCOOP and presented at the annual conference of the Canadian Tax Foundation.

For a Global Environnemental Tax System : New Tools Study carried out by TaxCOOP and presented at COP25 in Madrid.

Forum for a War Tax Against Covid-19 Forum on behalf of TaxCOOP in L’Obs, published in 2020.

== Heavy Artillery : A War Tax Against COVID-19? ==
Opinion piece published in ITR in 2020. Documentary Fast and Dangerous Race to the Bottom Short documentary directed by Brigitte Alepin, premiered at TaxCOOP2020 – World Tax Summit, and on Ici RDI, Les grands reportages.
