= This Mountain Life =

- Directed by: Grant Baldwin
- Written by: Jenny Rustemeyer; Grant Baldwin
- Produced by: Jenny Rustemeyer
- Cinematography: Grant Baldwin
- Edited by: Grant Baldwin
- Music by: Grant Baldwin; Stephen Fuller
- Production company: Peg Leg Films
- Release date: October 2018 (VIFF)
- Running time: 76 minutes
- Country: Canada
- Language: English

This Mountain Life is a Canadian documentary film, directed by Grant Baldwin and released in 2018. The film centres on various residents of the Canadian province of British Columbia and their relationships with the province's mountain landscape, including a mother and daughter undertaking a 2,300 kilometre trek through the Coast Mountains, a married couple who have lived off the grid in the mountains for over 50 years, a pair of avalanche survivors and a group of Roman Catholic nuns living at an isolated nunnery in the Garibaldi Ranges.

The film had its theatrical premiere at the 2018 Vancouver International Film Festival.

The film won Best Visual Film at the 2018 Kendal Mountain Festival, and later received a Vancouver Film Critics Circle nomination for Best British Columbia Film.
