= It's Not Funny Anymore: Vice to Proud Boys =

- Directed by: Sébastien Trahan
- Written by: Laurel Baker; Sébastien Trahan
- Produced by: Annie Bourdeau; Pablo Salzman
- Starring: Thomas Morton
- Edited by: Laura Antohi
- Production companies: Urbania; Connect 3 Media
- Distributed by: Canadian Broadcasting Corporation
- Release date: October 24, 2024
- Running time: 88 minutes
- Country: Canada
- Language: English

It's Not Funny Anymore: Vice to Proud Boys is a Canadian documentary film, directed by Sébastien Trahan and released in 2024. The film explores the question of how Gavin McInnes, the Canadian political commentator originally known as a co-founder of the cultural magazine Vice, became radicalized as a far-right agitator who founded the neo-fascist Proud Boys organization.

Produced by Urbania magazine in conjunction with Connect 3 Media, the film is hosted by former Vice editor Thomas Morton. It debuted October 24, 2024, on Documentary, before being added to the CBC Gem platform the following day.

The film won the Canadian Screen Award for Best Documentary Program at the 13th Canadian Screen Awards in 2025.
