= Brigitte Alepin =

Canadian tax expert

Brigitte Alepin, born in 1966, is a Canadian tax specialist. She is notable for her published works, documentaries, the TaxCOOP conferences she co-founded and her various media interventions related to tax justice, as well as philanthropic and environmental taxation.

== Education ==
Brigitte Alepin holds a bachelor's degree in accounting from Université du Québec à Montréal, obtained in 1986. She was the recipient of the Excellence Award, and obtained the title of Chartered Professional Accountant.

She obtained a Master's degree in taxation in 1990 from the Université de Sherbrooke. She received a scholarship from the Canadian Research Fund, and her thesis proposed the creation of the Home Buyers' Plan (HBP).

In 2005, she studied at Harvard University, where she obtained a Master of Public Administration (majoring in Microeconomics) in 2006.

== Achievements and Media ==
In 2003, Brigitte Alepin published her first book, the best-selling Ces riches qui ne paient pas d'impôt (The Wealthy Who Pay No Taxes).

The conclusions of this work were the subject of a debate in the House of Commons of Canada. The Canadian government subsequently opened a public inquiry into tax havens and summoned Brigitte Alepin to the public finance committee as a tax expert. She has been called as an expert witness on more than 12 occasions before the Canadian House of Commons Standing Committee on Finance. She also testified before the Commission des Lois of the National Assembly of France.

Brigitte Alepin was a columnist for Le Journal de Montréal between 2004 and 2005 (the column she started was continued by Yves Séguin). She edited CA Magazine's Fiscalité-PME column from 2007 to 2012.

She worked with Ici Radio-Canada Télé on major investigations into important tax cases. This research was broadcast on the programs Enjeux and Enquête. One of the Enquête programs produced by Sovimage was inspired by her book, The Wealthy Who Pay No Taxes. From 2013 to 2014, Brigitte Alepin acted as exclusive special advisor for the CBC on “major media events” that fell within her expertise. She has been consulted by politicians who wish to know her opinion on various tax matters and has acted as an expert witness on various committees of the House of Commons and the Canadian Senate.

During her studies at Harvard, Brigitte Alepin worked on a special project aimed at developing an international tax system adapted to the globalization of trade: "The Adaptation of Our Tax Systems to Globalization." These writings have been studied internationally and certain conclusions were presented in the magazine L'Actualité in 2006.

In view of the 2009 United Nations Climate Change Conference, Brigitte Alepin received the mandate from CPA Canada and a group of companies to verify how to better use taxation to help Canada take the green transition. Its conclusions were presented internationally, in various media and to political representatives.

In 2012, the Quebec Health Commissioner gave the mandate to Brigitte Alepin and the firm Raymond Chabot Grant Thornton to estimate health costs in Quebec in 2030, given the aging population and the increase in disease chronicles.

The Government of Quebec's Taxation Review Commission entrusted Brigitte Alepin with the mandate "Les grandes orientations internationales en matière de fiscalité" (Major trends in international taxation) in the fall of 2014.

The documentary film The Price We Pay, directed by Harold Crooks and produced by InformAction Films, was inspired by the book The Coming Fiscal Crisis, which Brigitte Alepin wrote in 2010. The film, released in theaters in fall 2014, was selected for the Hot Docs Forum and by the Toronto International Film Festival in 2014. In 2016, Brigitte Alepin won a Gémeaux Award from the Canadian Academy of Cinema and Television for co-writing the film The Price to Pay.

In 2016, Alepin was included in the list of the 50 most influential tax professionals in the world, according to the magazine International Tax Review ITR.

She contributed the chapter “100 Years of Tax in Canada,” published in the book Etat du Québec 2017.

In 2017, Brigitte Alepin acted as a collaborator and advisor for the Commission sur les Finances du Québec in the development of its "Action plan to ensure tax equity" in Quebec.

In 2017, she acted as an advisor to Quebec Minister of Finance Carlos Leitão in order to put in place new tax measures to ensure the supervision of e-commerce and tax fairness towards traditional and local commerce.

In 2018, she co-authored the study “Family taxation: a model to redefine”, in collaboration with Raymond Chabot Grant Thornton and the Université du Québec à Montréal. The conclusions of this study were presented in 2018 by her and the Quebec CPA Order to the Minister of Justice of Québec, the Honorable Sonia Lebel, and during the public consultations launched by the Government of Québec within the framework of family law reform.

In 2019, she signed the study “For global environmental tax system: new tools” presented with Louise Otis at the 2019 United Nations Climate Change Conference of the United Nations.

In 2021, she signed the chapter “Treasury efficiency of the Canadian tax regime for private foundations and their founders” in the book The Routledge Handbook of Taxation and Philanthropy.

Brigitte Alepin is the instigator and co-founder of the international TaxCOOP conferences with the aim of putting international tax competition on the global tax reform agenda.

The TaxCOOP conferences were presented in Montreal in 2015 and 2020 and within international organizations during the years 2016 (World Bank), 2017 (United Nations), 2018 (OECD) and 2019 (COP25 in Madrid). TaxCOOP has been ranked on the prestigious Global Tax 50 of the most influential personalities and organizations in the world in taxation by the International Tax Review.

Brigitte Alepin joined the School of Management Sciences at the Université du Québec à Montreal as a professor in 2017 29 and the Université du Québec en Outaouais in 2019.

== Published works ==
- Alepin, Brigitte (2004). Ces riches qui ne paient pas d'impôt. MERIDIEN ED DU, Montreal.
- Alepin, Brigitte (2010). La Crise fiscale qui vient. VLB Éditeur, Montreal.
- Alepin, Brigitte (2012). Bill Gates, Pay Your Fair Share of Taxes...Like We Do!. James Lorimer & Co. Ltd, Toronto.
- Alepin, Brigitte (2021). Winning the Tax Wars. James Lorimer & Co. Ltd, Toronto.
- Alepin, Brigitte (2017). Chapter: 100 Years of Tax in Canada in État de Québec 2017. Institut du nouveau monde, Montreal.

== Filmography ==
=== 4.1 As screenwriter ===
2014: The Price We Pay. Nominated for the 2014 TOP TEN of the Toronto International Film Festival (TIFF) and chosen Best Canadian Documentary by the Vancouver Film Critics Circle31. Brigitte Alepin presented the film The Price We Pay at several festivals and international organizations, including two performances at the Organization for Economic Co-operation and Development (OECD Forum 2015[2]32 and at the 10th anniversary of the Global Forum on Transparency and Exchange of Information for Tax Purposes in 2019.

=== 4.2 As director ===
2020: Rapide et Dangereuse - A fiscal race towards the abyss (Fast & Dangerous race to the bottom)34: Chosen and presented in the Grands Reportages 35 of ICI RDI and recipient of the Humanitarian Award for Best Shorts Competition 2020.

== Charitable activities ==
=== 5.1 Radio-Dodo ===
Radio-Dodo is an idea of Brigitte Alepin. Radio-Dodo's programs in French and Arabic are intended for Syrian children living in war zones and Syrian refugee children aged three to seven. Radio-Dodo's mission is to help children fall asleep. Radio-Dodo has been on the air since January 1, 2016 and is sponsored by UNESCO37. In May 2017, Radio-Dodo organized a humanitarian mission in Gaziantep, where the administrator, Brigitte Alepin, gave toys and radios to Syrian children.
