= Sitting on the Edge of Marlene =

2014 Canadian crime drama film

- Film poster
- Directed by: Ana Valine
- Written by: Ana Valine
- Produced by: Amber Ripley
- Starring: Suzanne Clément; Paloma Kwiatkowski; Callum Keith Rennie; Dakota Daulby
- Cinematography: Steve Cosens
- Edited by: Lara Mazur; Fredrik Thorsen
- Production companies: Foundation Features; Rodeo Queen Pictures
- Release date: September 2014 (Cinefest Sudbury)
- Running time: 96 minutes
- Country: Canada
- Language: English

Sitting on the Edge of Marlene is a Canadian crime drama film, directed by Ana Valine and released in 2014. An adaptation of Billie Livingston's novella The Trouble with Marlene, the film stars Suzanne Clément as Marlene Bell, a grifter and con artist who is indoctrinating her daughter Sammie (Paloma Kwiatkowski) in the ways of crime with the help of her colleague Fast Freddy (Callum Keith Rennie); meanwhile, Sammie has other ideas about her future, and develops a romantic interest in Drew (Dakota Daulby), a devoutly Christian teenager who hangs out at the local roller rink.

The film was shot in Vancouver, British Columbia in 2013, and had its theatrical premiere on the film festival circuit in 2014 before going into commercial release in 2015.

In 2016, the film was picked up for U.S. distribution by Breaking Glass Pictures.

== Critical response ==
Chris Knight of the National Post gave the film a mixed review, writing that it was uneven but praising Clément and Kwiatkowski's performances. For Now, Radheyan Simonpillai placed the film in the context of an apparent eruption of mommy issues in Canadian cinema, alongside David Cronenberg's Maps to the Stars and Xavier Dolan's Mommy, opining that the character of Marlene "resembles five Dolan characters spun into one" but praising Kwiatkowski for keeping the film anchored in smaller comedic moments. He concluded that "Sammie's frustrated attempts to escape either through suicide or Jesus are handled with a light touch and feel genuine and quirky, very different from the heavy mugging going on the rest of the time."

== Awards ==
Valine won the award for Best Director at the Leo Awards in 2014, and Grant Pearse won the award for Best Production Design. The film was also a nominee for Best Picture, Best Actress (Kwiatkowski), Best Screenplay (Valine), Best Editing (Lara Mazur and Fredrik Thorsen) and Best Sound Editing (Greg Stewart, Miguel Nunes, Gina Mueller, Don Harrison and Ian Mackie).

At the 2014 Vancouver International Film Festival, Valine won the awards for BC Emerging Filmmaker and Women in Film & Television Vancouver Artistic Merit. At the Vancouver Film Critics Circle Awards 2014, Rennie was nominated for Best Supporting Actor in a Canadian Film and the film was nominated for Best First Film by a Canadian Director.
