= The Sun, The Moon & The Hurricane =

2014 film directed by Andri Cung

The Sun, The Moon & The Hurricane is a 2014 Indonesian drama film directed by Andri Cung in his directorial debut, produced by Goodsheep Production in collaboration with Kinekuma Pictures. The film stars William Tjokro, Cornelio Sunny, Natalius Chendana, Gesata Stella, and Paul Agusta. According to Andri, the film represents different phases of human life: times filled with many problems are likened to the hurricane, while youth, full of dramatic love stories, is symbolized by the sun, and adulthood, which is calmer and more stable, is represented by the moon. The film had its world premiere at the Vancouver International Film Festival in 2014, where Andri was nominated for the Best New Director award.

== Plot ==
The film narrates Rain when he is 32 years old, he reflects on his life, realizing it all began the day that Kris defended him from his high school bullies. Kris demanded friendship, insisted on sleepovers, and isolated Rain from other friends, even while Kris himself frequently went out with other girls. Rain, aware of his own homosexuality, struggled to understand. He felt abandoned when Kris suddenly vanished.

However, Rain managed to move past this, gaining sexual experience during a trip to Bangkok. Years later, he receives an invitation to visit Kris, who is now married and living in Bali.

== Cast ==
- William Tjokro as Rain
- Cornelio Sunny as Will
- Natalius Chendana as Kris
- Gesata Stella as Susan
- Paul Agusta as Oom

== Award ==
The production took place from April 2013 to March 2014, with scenes shot in Bangkok, Bali, and Jakarta. Andri was nominated as Best new director in Vancouver International Film Festival 2014. Andri also got nominated in Piala Maya, Indonesian Film Award for Best Original Screenplay and also got William nominated as Best Newcomer Award During the screening of the film on 4 June 2015, Andri told all the audience that all the actor that play the gay character is straight.
