= Sébastien Trahan =

Canadian documentary filmmaker

Sébastien Trahan is a Canadian documentary filmmaker from Montreal, Quebec, who directed a number of short and television documentaries before making his feature debut with Code of Misconduct in 2026.

His first English-language documentary, the 2024 television film It's Not Funny Anymore: Vice to Proud Boys, won the award for Best Documentary Program at the 13th Canadian Screen Awards in 2025.

== Filmography ==
- Belle maman - 2009
- Le Meilleur des mondes - 2011
- Manon Lauzon - 2012
- Pour le plaisir - 2013
- Bonne fête - 2014
- Inside - 2014
- Le dernier vol de Raymond Boulanger - 2020
- Corruption: Les révélations choc de la commission Charbonneau - 2022
- Cocaine, Prison & Likes: Isabelle's True Story - 2022
- It's Not Funny Anymore: Vice to Proud Boys - 2024
- Le printemps le plus long - 2025
- Code of Misconduct - 2026

== Awards ==
| Award | Year | Category | Work | Result | Ref |
|---|---|---|---|---|---|
| Hot Docs Canadian International Documentary Festival | 2026 | Earl A. Glick Emerging Canadian Filmmaker Award | Code of Misconduct | Won | |
| Prix Gémeaux | 2021 | Best Direction - Documentary : Biography or Portrait, arts and culture, nature, sciences and environment | Le dernier vol de Raymond Boulanger | Won | |
