= Vancouver Film Critics Circle Awards 2014 =

Annual Canadian film awards ceremony

The nominations for the 15th Vancouver Film Critics Circle Awards, honoring the best in filmmaking in 2014, were announced on December 22, 2014. The winners were announced on January 5, 2015.

== Winners and nominees ==
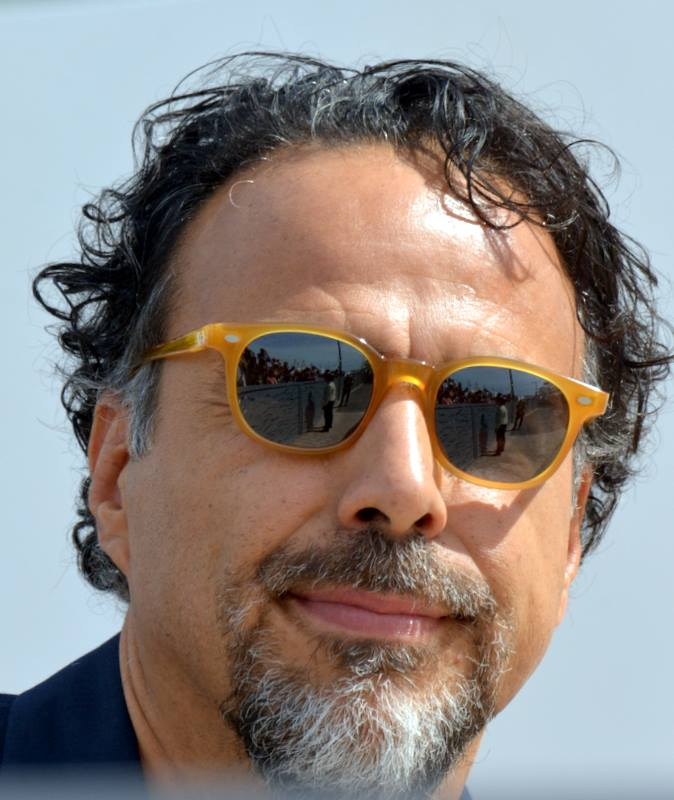
Alejandro G. Iñárritu, Best Director winner

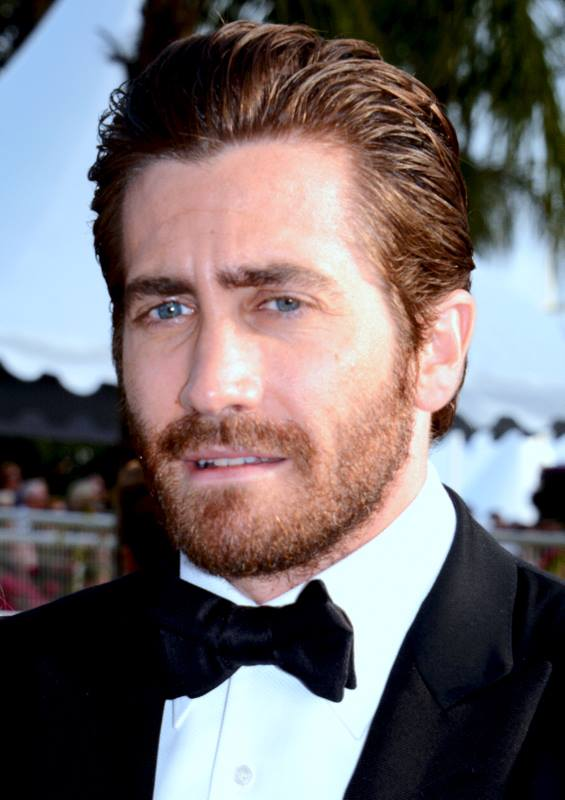
Jake Gyllenhaal, Best Actor winner

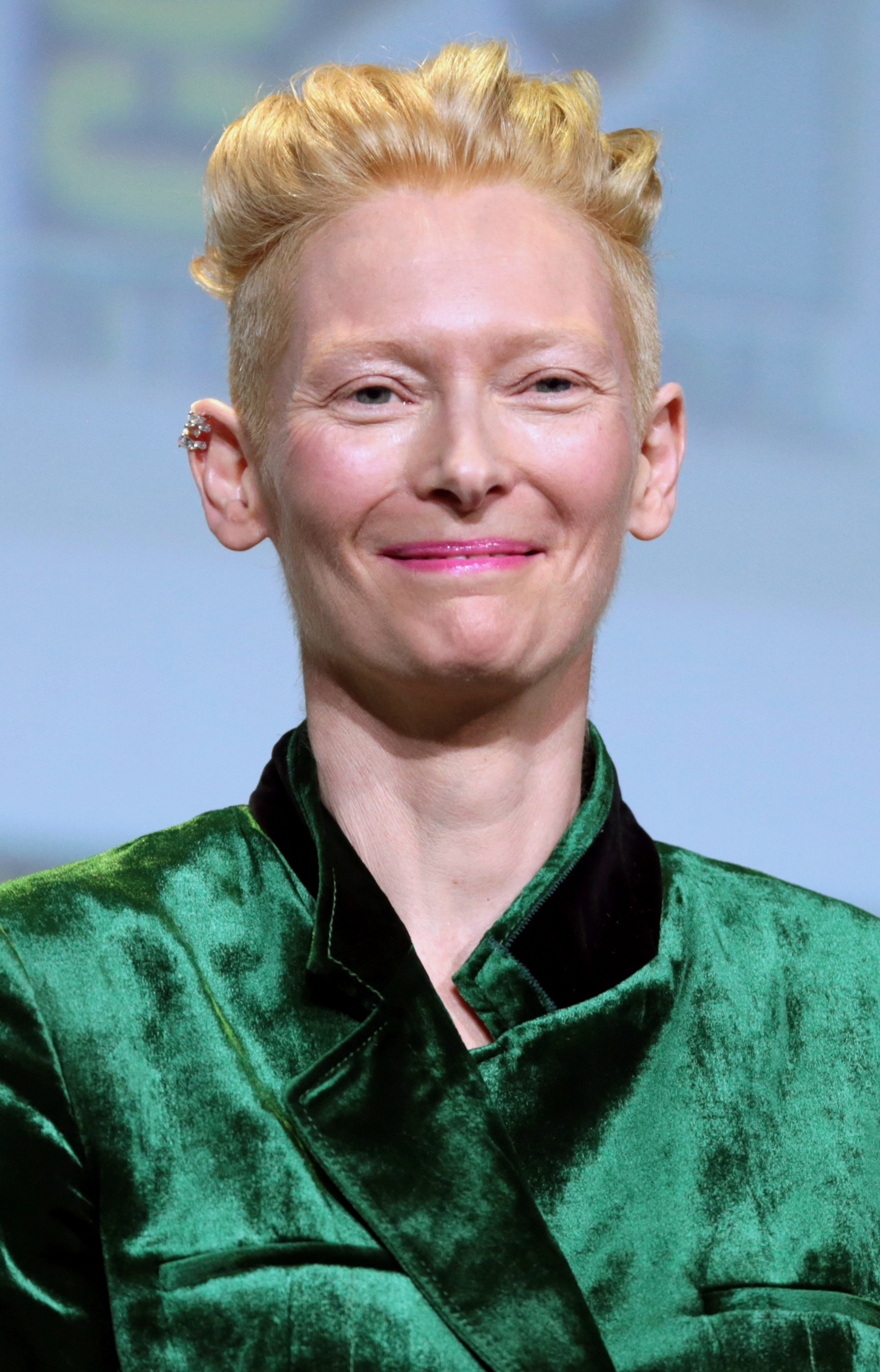
Tilda Swinton, Best Actress winner

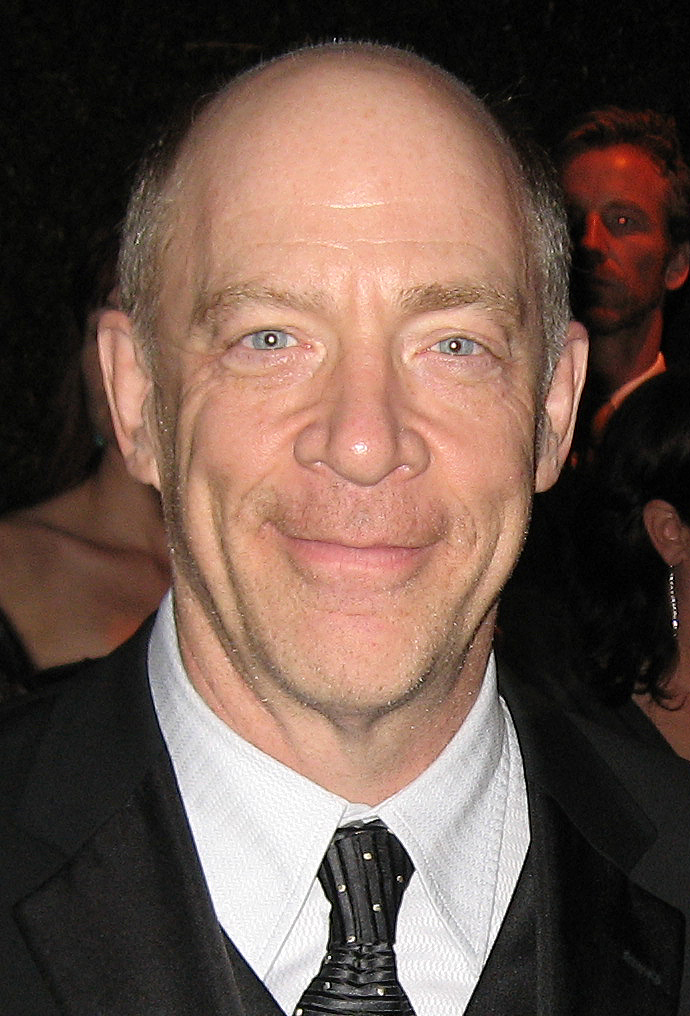
J. K. Simmons, Best Supporting Actor winner

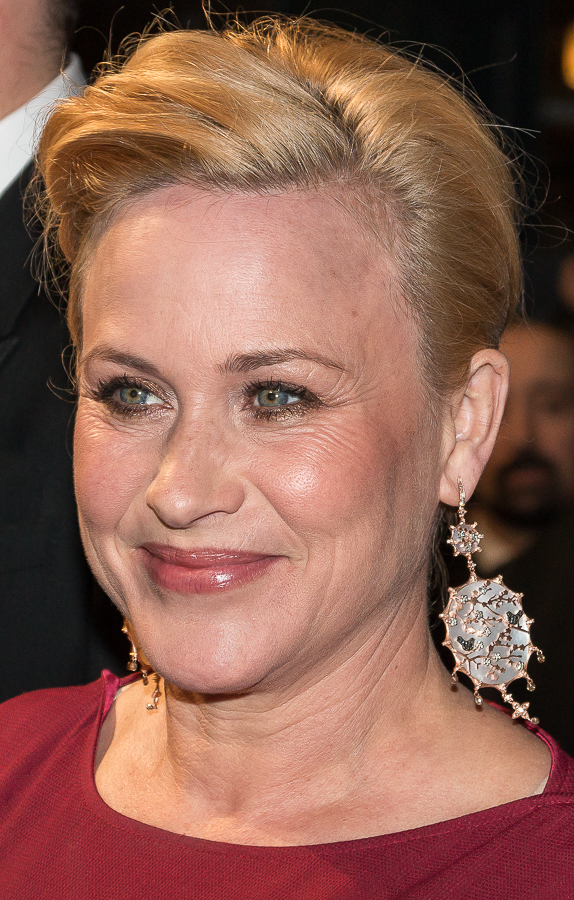
Patricia Arquette, Best Supporting Actress winner

=== International ===
Best Film

- Boyhood
- Birdman or (The Unexpected Virtue of Ignorance)
- Whiplash

Best Director

- Alejandro G. Iñárritu – Birdman or (The Unexpected Virtue of Ignorance)
- Wes Anderson – The Grand Budapest Hotel
- Richard Linklater – Boyhood

Best Actor

- Jake Gyllenhaal – Nightcrawler
- Benedict Cumberbatch – The Imitation Game
- Michael Keaton – Birdman or (The Unexpected Virtue of Ignorance)

Best Actress

- Tilda Swinton – Only Lovers Left Alive
- Marion Cotillard – The Immigrant
- Reese Witherspoon – Wild

Best Supporting Actor

- J. K. Simmons – Whiplash
- Edward Norton – Birdman or (The Unexpected Virtue of Ignorance)
- Mark Ruffalo – Foxcatcher

Best Supporting Actress

- Patricia Arquette – Boyhood
- Jessica Chastain – A Most Violent Year
- Laura Dern – Wild

Best Screenplay

- Wes Anderson – The Grand Budapest Hotel
- Alejandro G. Iñárritu, Nicolás Giacobone, Alexander Dinelaris Jr., and Armando Bo – Birdman or (The Unexpected Virtue of Ignorance)
- Richard Linklater – Boyhood

Best Foreign Language Film

- Force Majeure
- Ida
- We Are the Best!

Best Documentary

- The Overnighters
- Citizenfour
- Virunga

=== Canadian ===
Best Canadian Film

- You're Sleeping Nicole (Tu dors Nicole)
- Enemy
- Mommy

Best Director of a Canadian Film

- Denis Villeneuve – Enemy
- Xavier Dolan – Mommy
- Stéphane Lafleur – You're Sleeping Nicole (Tu dors Nicole)

Best Actor in a Canadian Film

- Antoine Olivier Pilon – Mommy
- Jake Gyllenhaal – Enemy
- Maxwell McCabe-Lokos – The Husband

Best Actress in a Canadian Film

- Julianne Côté – You're Sleeping Nicole (Tu dors Nicole)
- Anne Dorval – Mommy
- Dagny Backer Johnsen – Violent

Best Supporting Actor in a Canadian Film

- Marc-André Grondin – You're Sleeping Nicole (Tu dors Nicole)
- Bruce Greenwood – Elephant Song
- Callum Keith Rennie – Sitting on the Edge of Marlene

Best Supporting Actress in a Canadian Film

- Suzanne Clément – Mommy
- Sarah Allen – The Husband
- Sarah Gadon – Enemy

Best Screenplay for a Canadian Film

- Xavier Dolan – Mommy
- Andrew Huculiak, Josh Huculiak, Cayne McKenzie, and Joseph Schweers – Violent
- Elan Mastai – The F Word

Best Canadian Documentary

- The Price We Pay
- Everything Will Be
- Just Eat It: A Food Waste Story

Best First Film by a Canadian Director

- Violent
- Sitting on the Edge of Marlene
- The Valley Below

Best British Columbia Film

- Violent
- Everything Will Be
- Preggoland
