= Billie Livingston =

Canadian writer

Billie Livingston is a Canadian novelist, short story writer, essayist, and poet.

== Life and career ==
Born in Hamilton, Ontario, Livingston grew up in Toronto and Vancouver, British Columbia. She lives in Vancouver.

Her critically acclaimed first novel, Going Down Swinging (2000), was followed by The Chick at the Back of the Church (2001), a poetry book that was shortlisted for the Pat Lowther Award. Her second novel, Cease to Blush, was published in 2006 and subsequently chosen as one of the year's best books by The Globe and Mail, January Magazine, and The Tyee. Livingston's One Good Hustle, a novel about a young woman's fear that she is genetically doomed to become a con artist, was long-listed for the 2012 Giller Prize and selected by The Globe and Mail, January Magazine, and Toronto's Now as one of the year's best books.

Livingston's short story collection, Greedy Little Eyes, was cited by The Globe and Mail as one of 2010's best books and by The Georgia Straight as one of the fifteen most outstanding books of the year. In 2011 Greedy Little Eyes won the Danuta Gleed Literary Award for Best Short Story Collection as well as the CBC's Bookie Award. In 2013, her novella The Trouble with Marlene was made into the feature film Sitting on the Edge of Marlene, directed by Ana Valine, and starring Suzanne Clément, Paloma Kwiatkowski and Callum Keith Rennie. The film was released in 2014.

2016 saw Livingston's American debut with the publication of The Crooked Heart of Mercy.

In addition to publications in journals and magazines around the world, Livingston's poetry has appeared in textbooks and on public transit through the TransLink "Poetry in Transit" program. She has received fellowships from The Banff Centre, MacDowell Colony, Escape to Create (Seaside, Florida), Ucross Foundation and Omi International Arts Center.

She is married to American actor and writer, Tim Kelleher.

== Awards and honours ==
In 2026, Livingston's story, The Headache, originally published by Dark Yonder, was nominated in the category of Best Crime Short Story for the Crime Writers of Canada Awards of Excellence. This story was also selected by series editor Otto Penzler and guest editor, Tess Gerritsen as one of twenty to appear in the 2026 edition of The Best Mystery Stories of the Year.

In 2025, Livingston's story, Houdini Act, originally published by The Saturday Evening Post, was nominated in the category of Best Crime Short Story for the Crime Writers of Canada Awards of Excellence.

Her short story, Same Old Song, which first appeared in Black Cat Weekly was selected by series editor Otto Penzler and guest editor, John Grisham as one of twenty to appear in the 2025 edition of The Best Mystery Stories of the Year.

In 2017, Billie Livingston received the Writers' Trust Engel/Findley Award "in recognition of a remarkable body of work, and in anticipation of future contributions to Canadian literature."

Livingston's 2010 short story collection Greedy Little Eyes won the Danuta Gleed Literary Award and was longlisted for the Frank O'Connor International Short Story Award. Her novel One Good Hustle was longlisted for the 2012 Scotiabank Giller Prize.

== Bibliography ==
=== Fiction ===
- The Crooked Heart of Mercy (January 2016 Canada, March 2016 U.S.)
- One Good Hustle (July 2012)(longlisted for the Giller Prize)
- Greedy Little Eyes (2010) Winner of the Danuta Gleed Literary Award, Winner of the CBC Bookie Award
- Cease to Blush (2006)
- Going Down Swinging (2000)

=== Young adult fiction ===
- The Trouble with Marlene (Annick Press, 2010)

=== Poetry ===
- The Chick at the Back of the Church (2001) Finalist for the Pat Lowther Award

=== Anthologies ===
- The Mysterious Bookshop Presents The Best Mystery Stories of the Year 2026 (Penzler Publishers, September 2026)
- The Mysterious Bookshop Presents The Best Mystery Stories of the Year 2025 (Penzler Publishers, September 2025)
- Crimeucopia: Crank It Up (Murderous Ink Press, November 2023)
- Literature and the Writing Process—Cdn Edition (Pearson, 2005)
- Northwest Edge: Fictions of Mass Destruction (Chiasmus Press, 2003)
- Dropped Threads 2 (Vintage Books, 2003)
- Love Poems for the Media Age (Ripple Effect Press, 2001)
- Journey Prize Anthology (McClelland and Stewart, 2001)
- Hammer and Tongs (Smoking Lung Press, 1999)
- The Edges of Time (Seraphim Editions, 1999)
- Meltwater (Banff Centre Press, 1999)
