= Travis Flores =

American writer (1991 – 2024)

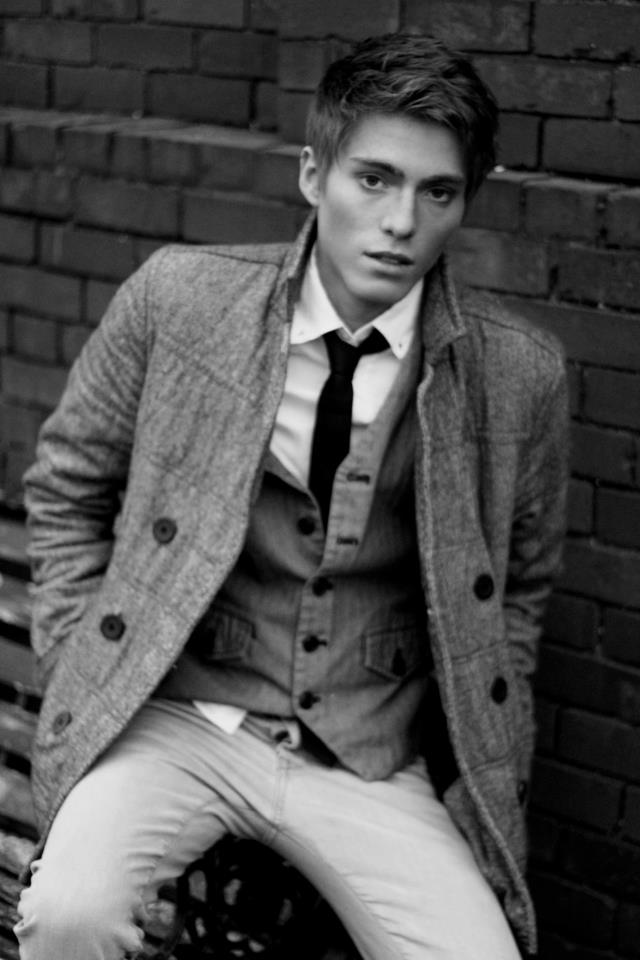
- Flores in 2012
- Born: Travis Michael Flores; April 7, 1991; Glendale, California, U.S.
- Died: May 23, 2024 (aged 33)
- Education: Marymount Manhattan College; New York University
- Occupations: Motivational speaker, writer, producer
- Years active: 2004–2024
- Partner: Clément Souyri

Travis Michael Flores (April 7, 1991 – May 23, 2024) was an American writer, activist, philanthropist, and motivational speaker, best known for being an advocate of cystic fibrosis and queer youth. He was a published children's book author and wrote for several magazines and publications, including OUT, UpWorthy, and DoSomething. He has been featured in works such as Chicken Soup for the Soul, Reader's Digest: Selections, Charlie's Cancer Rescue, The Lemonade Stand, and The Key of Awesome as a parody of One Direction singer Liam Payne.

== Life ==
=== Early life (1991–2003) ===
Flores was born in Glendale, California, on April 7, 1991. He was diagnosed with cystic fibrosis when he was 4 months old.

=== Activism and writing career (2003–2024) ===
Flores began his activism career at the age of 12, when he began work with illustrator Michelle Ciappa to prepare his children's book The Spider Who Never Gave Up for publishing. In 2004, after the book was published, Flores began a motivational speaking and book tour at the age of 13. A year later, Flores partnered with Disney to print an edition of his book for a Make-A-Wish Foundation event, in which two million dollars was donated to the charity.

Flores had cystic fibrosis and was a spokesperson for various cystic fibrosis-related organisation and fundraisers. He carried out charitable work with the Make-A-Wish Foundation and the Cystic Fibrosis Foundation and donated a large percentage of his children's book proceeds to the two organisations. He helped to raise money for the Cystic Fibrosis Foundation and Make-A-Wish, and other charities, including the Christina Grimmie Foundation and Global Genes. Flores also established his own 501(c)(3) organization in 2005, which provides laptops to chronically ill young people in hospitals.

Flores started college when he was sixteen and received his bachelor's degree in acting from Marymount Manhattan College at the age of twenty. In 2010, during his work as an undergraduate student, he worked with Susan Batson on the Broadway workshops of the Tennessee Williams play, In Masks Outrageous and Austere. In 2012, the play opened at the Culture Project theatre in New York City, but Flores was no longer affiliated with the project. While working in New York City, he attended New York University and graduated in the spring of 2013 with a master's degree in fundraising.

On March 3, 2015, Flores successfully received a double-lung transplant at Ronald Reagan UCLA Medical Center. Following the operation, he continued his work in entertainment and later underwent a second double-lung transplant on October 3, 2017, at the same medical facility. In January 2019, his second transplant was rejected by his body. On May 5, 2020, Flores received his third bilateral lung transplant, making him 1 of approximately 30 worldwide to have ever undergone 3 double-lung transplants.

In May 2019, Flores came out as gay on the CW series My Last Days, making him the first person to come out on the network.

Flores lived in Los Angeles, California, with his partner, Clément Souyri, before his death. He continued to pursue his philanthropic work, acting and writing. His parents, Timothy and Teresa Flores, as well as his two siblings, live in Ohio.
