= Violent (film) =

- Directed by: Andrew Huculiak
- Written by: Andrew Huculiak; Josh Huculiak; Joseph Schweers; Cayne McKenzie
- Produced by: Josh Huculiak; Amy Darling; Brent Hodge
- Starring: Dagny Backer Johnsen; Mari Sofie Andreassen; Karl Bird; Tomine Mikkeline Eide; Tor Halvor Halvorsen; Yngve Seterås
- Cinematography: Joseph Schweers
- Music by: We Are the City
- Production company: Amazing Factory
- Distributed by: Media Darling
- Release date: September 30, 2014 (Vancouver International Film Festival)
- Running time: 102 minutes
- Countries: Canada; Norway
- Languages: Norwegian; English
- Budget: $300,000

Violent is a 2014 Canadian-Norwegian drama film directed by Andrew Huculiak and created by the Vancouver-based production company Amazing Factory Productions. The film acts as a companion to the Vancouver band We Are the City's album of the same name. Though the film features an original score by the band, none of the band's songs are featured in the film.

== Plot synopsis ==
The film follows Dagny (Dagny Backer Johnsen), a young woman longing to escape small-town life and move to the big city. Dagny's mother arranges for her to work for a family friend who lives in the city. Dagny recalls her most recent memories of the five people who loved her the most, all while experiencing a catastrophic event.

== Production ==
The movie, produced by Josh Huculiak, Amy Darling of Media Darling and Brent Hodge of Hodgee Films, was made for $300,000, and was shot sometimes with less than five crew members on set at a time. The film is the feature film debut for Amazing Factory Productions, who are well known for creating music videos for bands such as Hey Ocean!, We Are the City and Said the Whale.

"The film was truly a collaboration between two Vancouver groups, one a band called We Are The City and the other a video production company called Amazing Factory," said Andrew Huculiak in an interview the Vancouver International Film Festival, "The film is mostly in Norwegian. None of us speak Norwegian. It’s funny, because we always knew that conducting this sort of experiment would be a challenge in many obvious ways, but there were so many things that came up as we were already deep into the process. For example, when we got to the editing room with all the footage taken in Norway we assumed that we could subtitle each individual takes by referencing the script, but it quickly became clear that doing it without knowing Norwegian would be impossible. There were natural breaks mid-sentence and we’d be like “where in the English translation are they stopping?”.

The script was written in English and translated into Norwegian with nobody on the production team speaking Norwegian. At times, there were fewer than five people on set at one time, and with no production vehicle, the crew would walk over ten kilometers a day.

== Reception ==
Etan Vlessing of The Hollywood Reporter wrote, "Huculiak is hurling a brick for Canadian newcomers with his Norwegian-language drama about impulsive teen angst that is filled with creative risk." Indiewire called the film "A sincere expression of a generous curiosity about some of life’s bigger questions, and an attempt to find, in the act of leave-taking, some wisdom and a kind of grace."

Marina Antunes of Quiet Earth called the film "brilliant" saying, "Huculiak marks Dagny's day to day normalcy with gorgeous, if sometimes baffling images. Some are abstract and look like static while others are simply strange, people and furniture floating above the city. Violent is unlike any other coming of age story I've seen and its unlikely I'll ever see another one quite this profound, a movie that works as both a story of self discovery and of self reflection at the same time. A fantastic achievement that is not to be missed."

Matthew Ritchie of Exclaim! applauded the film, saying that the film draws "on the synth-based soundscapes and minimalist distorted rumblings hidden underneath the band's recent LP of the same name, the film and album act like strange companion pieces that enhance one another while not being entirely essential to enjoying the experience of either. That being said, if you're a fan of We Are the City, Huculiak's first-time feature feels like a testament to not only his strength as an up-and-coming musician, but a cinematic savant as well."

The Georgia Straight's Adrian Mack called the film "an utterly audacious feature debut" adding, "You might accuse these young filmmakers of relying a little too heavily on mood and visual poetics for Violent’s deliberately paced two hours, if it wasn’t for the uniformly impressive performances, grand scale, and genuine emotional payload achieved by the end."

The film was included in the list of Canada's Top Ten feature films of 2014, selected by a panel of filmmakers and industry professionals organized by TIFF.

At the 2015 Leo Awards, Violent won 8 awards, including Best Motion Picture, Best Direction, Best Screenwriting, and Best Cinematography.

List of Awards and Nominations
Award	Date of ceremony	Category	Recipient(s)	Result
Amiens International Film Festival	November 22, 2014	SIGNIS Award	Andrew Huculiak	Won
Annonay International Film Festival	February 9, 2015	Lycéens Jury Prize	Andrew Huculiak	Won
Annonay International Film Festival	February 9, 2015	Special Jury Prize	Andrew Huculiak	Won
Annonay International Film Festival	February 9, 2015	Grand Jury Prize	Andrew Huculiak	Nominated
Karlovy Vary International Film Festival	July 12, 2014	Independent Camera	Andrew Huculiak	Nominated
Leo Awards	June 14, 2015	Best Motion Picture		Won
Leo Awards	June 14, 2015	Best Direction in a Motion Picture	Andrew Huculiak	Won
Leo Awards	June 14, 2015	Best Screenwriting in a Motion Picture	Andrew Huculiak	Won
Leo Awards	June 14, 2015	Best Cinematography in a Motion Picture	Joseph Schweers	Won
Leo Awards	June 14, 2015	Best Picture Editing in a Motion Picture	Joseph Schweers	Won
Leo Awards	June 14, 2015	Best Visual Effects in a Feature Length Drama	Joseph Schweers; Marc Whitelaw	Won
Leo Awards	June 14, 2015	Best Musical Score in a Motion Picture	We Are The City	Won
Leo Awards	June 14, 2015	Best Casting in a Motion Picture	Cayne McKenzie; Andrew Huculiak	Won
Leo Awards	June 14, 2015	Best Production Design in a Motion Picture	Cayne McKenzie	Nominated
Vancouver Film Critics Circle	January 5, 2015	Best First Film by a Canadian Director	Andrew Huculiak	Won
Vancouver Film Critics Circle	January 5, 2015	Best British Columbia Film		Won
Vancouver Film Critics Circle	January 5, 2015	Best Actress in a Canadian Film	Dagny Backer Johnsen	Nominated
Vancouver Film Critics Circle	January 5, 2015	Best Screenplay for a Canadian Film	Andrew Huculiak; Josh Huculiak; Cayne McKenzie; Joseph Schweers	Nominated
Vancouver International Film Festival	October 4, 2014	Best Canadian Film		Won
Vancouver International Film Festival	October 4, 2014	Best British Columbia Film		Won
Vancouver International Film Festival	October 4, 2014	Best Emerging BC Filmmaker	Andrew Huculiak	Nominated
