= Andrew Huculiak =

Canadian musician and film director

Andrew Huculiak is a Canadian musician and film director. His debut feature film Violent, released in 2014, won the Vancouver Film Critics Circle Award for Best British Columbia Film in 2014 and was named to the Toronto International Film Festival's year-end Canada's Top Ten list. The film also won several Leo Awards in 2015, including Best Picture, Best Director and Best Screenplay.

His second feature film, Ash, was released in 2019.

As a musician, he is associated with the indie rock band We Are the City.
