= All the Time in the World (2014 film) =

- Film poster
- Directed by: Suzanne Crocker
- Written by: Suzanne Crocker; Nettie Wild; Carrie Gadsby
- Produced by: Suzanne Crocker
- Cinematography: Suzanne Crocker
- Edited by: Michael Parfit
- Music by: Cameron Daye; Anne Louise Genest; Alex Houghton
- Production company: Drift Productions
- Release date: October 1, 2014 (VIFF)
- Running time: 87 minutes
- Country: Canada
- Language: English

All the Time in the World is a Canadian documentary film, directed by Suzanne Crocker and released in 2014. The film documents the decision of Crocker and her family to spend nine months away from their home in Dawson City, Yukon to live off the grid in a wilderness setting entirely without modern technological conveniences such as electricity or indoor plumbing.

The film premiered at the 2014 Vancouver International Film Festival, where it won the award for Most Popular Canadian Documentary. It was screened at the Available Light Film Festival in Whitehorse, Yukon, in 2015, where it won the Audience Award for Best Canadian Documentary.
