= Paloma Kwiatkowski =

Canadian film and television actress (born 1994)

- Born: Paloma Kwiatkowski; May 29, 1994 (age 31); Vancouver, British Columbia, Canada
- Education: Canadian Improv Games
- Occupation: Actor
- Years active: 2012–present

Paloma Kwiatkowski (born May 29, 1994) is a Canadian film and television actress. She is best known for her roles as Thalia Grace in Percy Jackson: Sea of Monsters (2013) and Cody in Bates Motel. She also received four Leo Award nominations and won once in 2018.

== Personal life ==
Kwiatkowski was born in Vancouver. She lives in Burnaby, British Columbia. Her parents moved to Canada from Poland. As a high school student at Templeton Secondary School, Kwiatkowski took part in theatre, improv, and film-making. She was captain of the improv team which competed in the Canadian Improv Games and received a scholarship to an acting program. Having graduated from high school in 2012, she was accepted into Simon Fraser University's film program but decided to defer her enrollment.

== Career ==
In April 2012, it was announced that Kwiatkowski had been cast as the demi-god Thalia Grace, daughter of Zeus in Percy Jackson: Sea of Monsters (2013). Her portrayal was met with mixed reviews mostly due to the fact she had a small role. Kwiatkowski plays a main role in Sitting on the Edge of Marlene, a 2014 film adaptation of a young adult book by Canadian author Billie Livingston. In August 2013, she was cast in the recurring role of Cody Brennan in the second season of Bates Motel. In May 2014, she joined the cast of an indie film, Who's Driving Doug.

== Filmography ==
=== Film ===
Year	Title	Role	Notes
2010	Whatever it Takes	Tiffany	Short film
2013	Percy Jackson: Sea of Monsters	Thalia Grace	
2013	Cheat	Madeleine Charbonneau	
2014	Sitting on the Edge of Marlene	Sammie Bell	
2015	The Mary Alice Brandon File	Mary Alice Brandon	Short film
2016	Who's Driving Doug	Stephanie	
2017	The Christmas Calendar	Chey	
2018	The Professor	Student	
2019	Riot Girls	Scratch	
2019	Multiverse	Loretta	also known as Entangled
2024	The Island Between Tides	Lily	also known as The Lost Daughter

=== Television ===
Year	Title	Role	Notes
2014	Bates Motel	Cody Brennan	6 episodes
2015	Wuthering High School	Cathy Earnshaw	Television film
2016	Motive	Sadie Novak	Episode: "The Score"
2016	L'instinct d'une mère	Emily Yates	Television film
2016	Supernatural	Magda Peterson	Episode: "American Nightmare"
2017	Garage Sale Mystery: A Case of Murder	Deb Macbeth	Television film
2017	The Christmas Calendar	Chey	Canadian TV film
2017	Travelers	Abigail Paris	Episode: "11:27"
2017	Christmas Princess	Chloe	Television film
2019	The 100	Octavia Blodreina Double	1 episode
2019	Unspeakable	Elizabeth Darby Stephens	4 episodes
2020	When Calls the Heart	Jenny	2 episodes
2021	Debris	Clara	1 episode
2024	Allegiance	Marcy	1 episode
2024	Murder in a Small Town	Bree	3 episodes

== Awards and nominations ==
Year	Award	Category	Nominated work	Result	Ref.
2014	16th Leo Awards	Best Lead Performance by a Female in a Motion Picture	Sitting on the Edge of Marlene	Nominated	
2018	20th Leo Awards	Best Supporting Performance by a Female in a Television Movie	The Christmas Calendar	Won	
2019	21st Leo Awards	Best Supporting Performance by a Female in a Dramatic Series	Unspeakable (episode: "Intent")	Nominated	
2020	22nd Leo Awards	Best Lead Performance by a Female in a Motion Picture	Riot Girls	Nominated	
