= Suzanne Crocker =

Canadian documentary filmmaker

Suzanne Crocker is a Canadian documentary filmmaker from Dawson City, Yukon. She is most noted for her films All the Time in the World (2014), which won the award for Most Popular Canadian Documentary at the 2014 Vancouver International Film Festival, and First We Eat, which was one of the winners of the Audience Award at the 2020 Hot Docs Canadian International Documentary Festival.
