= List of Canadian films of 2014 =

This is a list of Canadian films which were released in 2014:

| Title | Director | Cast | Genre | Notes |
|---|---|---|---|---|
| 15 to Life: Kenneth's Story | Nadine Pequeneza | Kenneth Young | Documentary | |
| 100 Miles from Hell | Eric Sewell, Ian Sewell, Stephen Sewell | Stephen Sewell, Matt Butler, Nathan Ewert | Action | |
| 1987 | Ricardo Trogi | Jean-Carl Boucher, Sandrine Bisson, Claudio Colangelo | Comedy, drama | Prix Jutra - Art Direction, Costumes, Hair |
| 3 Indian Tales (3 histoires d'Indiens) | Robert Morin | | Drama | |
| All the Time in the World | Suzanne Crocker | | Documentary | |
| All Yours (Je suis à toi) | David Lambert | Nahuel Pérez Biscayart, Jean-Michel Balthazar, Monia Chokri | Drama | Belgian-Canadian coproduction |
| Ally Was Screaming | Jeremy Thomas | Camille Sullivan, Charlie Carrick, Giacomo Baessato, Arielle Rombough, Niall Matter | Dark comedy-thriller film | Union of BC Performers award (Camille Sullivan) |
| Aloft | Claudia Llosa | Jennifer Connelly, Cillian Murphy, Ian Tracey | Drama | Canada-France-Spain co-production |
| Anti-Social Limited | Rosvita Dransfeld | Chris Hoard | Documentary | |
| Backcountry | Adam MacDonald | Eric Balfour, Melanie Mullen, Missy Peregrym | Drama, horror-thriller | |
| Bang Bang Baby | Jeffrey St. Jules | Jane Levy, Justin Chatwin, Peter Stormare | Science fiction/musical | TIFF - Best Canadian First Feature Film; Claude Jutra Award |
| Before the Last Curtain Falls | Thomas Wallner | | Documentary | |
| Ben's at Home | Mars Horodyski | Dan Abramovici, Jessica Embro | Romantic comedy | |
| Big Eyes | Tim Burton | Amy Adams, Christoph Waltz, Danny Huston, Jon Polito, Krysten Ritter, Jason Schwartzman, Terence Stamp | Biographical drama | |
| Big News from Grand Rock | Daniel Perlmutter | Ennis Esmer, Gordon Pinsent, Aaron Ashmore | Comedy | |
| Big Muddy | Jefferson Moneo | Nadia Litz, Justin Kelly, Stephen McHattie | Neo-western crime drama | Shot in Saskatoon and southern Saskatchewan |
| Bison | Kevan Funk | Dylan Playfair, Tyler Burrows, James Michel, Kurt Max Runte | Short drama | |
| The Boxtrolls | Graham Annable, Anthony Stacchi | Ben Kingsley, Isaac Hempstead Wright, Elle Fanning, Dee Bradley Baker, Steve Blum, Toni Collette, Jared Harris, Nick Frost, Richard Ayoade, Tracy Morgan, Simon Pegg | Stop-motion animated fantasy comedy | |
| Brick Mansions | Camille Delamarre | David Belle, Catalina Denis, Paul Walker | Crime drama | Canada-France co-production |
| A Brony Tale | Brent Hodge | Ashleigh Ball, Andrea Libman, Nicole Oliver | Documentary | Canada-New Zealand co-production made with U.S. financing |
| The Calling | Jason Stone | Gil Bellows, Topher Grace, Susan Sarandon | Thriller | |
| The Captive | Atom Egoyan | Ryan Reynolds, Scott Speedman, Rosario Dawson | Thriller | |
| Cast No Shadow | Christian Sparkes | Percy Hynes White, Mary-Colin Chisholm, Joel Thomas Hynes | Drama | |
| The Cut (La Coupe) | Geneviève Dulude-De Celles | Milya Corbeil Gauvreau, Alain Houle | Short drama | |
| Cutaway | Kazik Radwanski | | Short drama | |
| Danny | Justin Simms & William D. MacGillivray | Danny Williams | National Film Board Documentary | |
| The Dependables | Sidney J. Furie | Seymour Cassel, Margot Kidder, Bo Svenson | Action, comedy | Direct to DVD |
| Dirty Singles | Alex Pugsley | Paul Campbell, Alex Paxton-Beesley, Ennis Esmer | Romantic comedy | |
| The Drownsman | Chad Archibald | Michelle Mylett, Caroline Korycki, Gemma Bird Matheson | Fantasy-horror-thriller | |
| Dr. Cabbie | Jean-François Pouliot | Vinay Virmani, Kunal Nayyar, Isabel Kaif | Comedy | |
| Ejecta | Chad Archibald & Matt Wiele | Lisa Houle, Julian Richings, Dee Wallace | Science fiction | |
| Elephant Song | Charles Binamé | Bruce Greenwood, Xavier Dolan, Catherine Keener, Carrie-Anne Moss | Drama | |
| The Empire of Scents (Le Nez) | Kim Nguyen | | Documentary | |
| Everything Will Be | Julia Kwan | | National Film Board Documentary | Canadian Screen Award - Best Cinematography in a Documentary; examines Vancouver's Chinatown |
| An Eye for Beauty (Le règne de la beauté) | Denys Arcand | Éric Bruneau, Mélanie Thierry, Melanie Merkosky, Marie-Josée Croze | Drama | |
| Fall | Terrance Odette | Michael Murphy, Wendy Crewson, Suzanne Clément | Drama | |
| Felix and Meira | Maxime Giroux | Hadas Yaron, Martin Dubreuil | Drama | TIFF - Best Canadian Feature Film; 2015 Canadian Screen Awards nomination for Best Picture |
| Finding Macpherson (Le Mystère MacPherson) | Serge Giguère | | Documentary produced with the National Film Board | Prix Jutra - Documentary |
| Forget and Forgive | Tristan Dubois | Elisabeth Röhm, Tygh Runyan, Neil Napier, Vivien Endicott-Douglas, Mal Dassin, Katy Grabstas, Richard Clarkin, Frank Moore, Julian Casey | Suspense-thriller television film | |
| From Prisons to Prisons (De prisons en prisons) | Steve Patry | | Documentary | |
| The Games Maker | Juan Pablo Buscarini | Joseph Fiennes, Tom Cavanagh, Megan Charpentier | Family, adventure | Canada-Argentina-Italy co-production |
| La Garde | Sylvain Archambault | Paul Doucet, Antoine L'Écuyer, Sandrine Bisson | Drama | |
| Garm Wars: The Last Druid | Mamoru Oshii | Lance Henriksen, Kevin Durand, Melanie St. Pierre | Science fiction | Canadian-Japanese co-production |
| Gore, Quebec | Jean Benoit Lauzon | Kate Elyse Forrest, Blake Mawson | Horror | |
| Guardian Angel (L'Ange gardien) | Jean-Sébatien Lord | Guy Nadon, Marilyn Castonguay, Patrick Hivon, Véronique Le Flaguais | Drama | |
| Guidance | Pat Mills | Pat Mills, Kevin Hanchard, Allison Hossack | Comedy | |
| Guidelines (La marche à suivre) | Jean-François Caissy | | National Film Board Documentary | |
| Guilda: Elle est bien dans ma peau | Julien Cadieux | Guilda | Documentary | |
| Heartbeat | Andrea Dorfman | Tanya Davis, Glen Matthews, Jackie Torrens | Drama | |
| Henri Henri | Martin Talbot | Victor Andrés Trelles Turgeon, Sophie Desmarais | Comedy | |
| Hit by Lightning | Ricky Blitt | Jon Cryer, Alexis Maitland, Will Sasso | Black comedy | Made with U.S. financing |
| Hole | Martin Edralin | Ken Harrower, Sebastian Deery, April Lee | Short drama | |
| How to Be Deadly | Nik Sexton | Leon Parsons, Gina Squires | Comedy | |
| I Am Syd Stone | Denis Theriault | Gharrett Patrick Paon, Michael Gaty | short drama | |
| I Put a Hit on You | Dane Clark, Linsey Stewart | Sara Canning, Aaron Ashmore | Comedy, thriller | |
| If You Love Your Children | Sanjay Patel (filmmaker) | Akash Sinha, Neha Kaul | Short | |
| In Deep Waters (Dans les eaux profondes) | Sarah Van den Boom | | Animated short | |
| In Her Place | Albert Shin | Kil Hae-Yeon | Drama | A Korean-language drama |
| In the Name of the King 3: The Last Mission | Uwe Boll | Dominic Purcell, Bashar Rahal | Action/adventure | Canada-Bulgaria co-production |
| Joy of Man's Desiring (Que ta joie demeure) | Denis Côté | Guillaume Tremblay | Docudrama | |
| Just Eat It: A Food Waste Story | Grant Baldwin | Grant Baldwin, Jenny Rustemeyer | Documentary | |
| Jutra | Marie-Josée Saint-Pierre | Claude Jutra | National Film Board animated short | Based on archival footage and animated sequences; Prix Jutra - Animated Short; Canadian Screen Award - Short Documentary |
| Kajutaijuq: The Spirit That Comes | Scott Brachmayer | Johnny Issaluk | Horror short | |
| Kung Fu Elliot | Matthew Bauckman & Jaret Belliveau | Elliot "White Lighting" Scott | Documentary | |
| Little Brother (Petit frère) | Rémi St-Michel | Étienne Galloy, Eric K. Boulianne | Short comedy | |
| The Little Queen (La Petite Reine) | Alexis Durand-Brault | Laurence Leboeuf, Patrice Robitaille | Drama | |
| Love in the Time of Civil War | Rodrigue Jean | Ana Christina Alva | Drama | |
| Love Project (Love Projet) | Carole Laure | Magalie Lépine-Blondeau, Benoît McGinnis, Natacha Filiatrault, Éric Robidoux, Céline Bonnier | Drama | |
| Maps to the Stars | David Cronenberg | Julianne Moore, Robert Pattinson, John Cusack, Mia Wasikowska | Drama | Canada-France-German co-production made with U.S. financing |
| Marinoni: The Fire in the Frame | Tony Girardin | Giuseppe Marinoni | Documentary | |
| The Masters of Suspense (Les Maîtres du suspense) | Stéphane Lapointe | Michel Côté; Robin Aubert; Antoine Bertrand | Comedy | |
| Me and My Moulton | Torill Kove | | Animated short produced with the National Film Board | Academy Award nominee; Canadian Screen Awards - Animated Short |
| Migration | Mark Lomond, Johanne Ste-Marie | | Animated short | |
| The Military Man (Le Militaire) | Noël Mitrani | Laurent Lucas | Drama | |
| Miraculum | Daniel Grou | Marilyn Castonguay, Gabriel Sabourin, Xavier Dolan, Robin Aubert | Drama | |
| Mommy | Xavier Dolan | Anne Dorval, Suzanne Clément, Antoine Olivier Pilon | Drama | |
| Mutant World | David Winning | Ashanti, Kim Coates, Amber Marshall | Science fiction | |
| My Little Pony: Equestria Girls – Rainbow Rocks | Jayson Thiessen | voices Tara Strong, Ashleigh Ball; Andrea Libman | Animated feature | Made with U.S. financing |
| Mynarski Death Plummet (Mynarski chute mortelle) | Matthew Rankin | | Experimental short, war drama | |
| The Nut Job | Peter Lepeniotis | voices Liam Neeson, Katherine Heigl, Brendan Fraser, Will Arnett | Animated feature | Canada-South Korea co-production made with U.S. funding |
| On the Trail of the Far Fur Country | Kevin Nikkel | | Documentary | |
| Out of Mind, Out of Sight | John Kastner | | Documentary produced with the National Film Board | best Canadian feature documentary, Hot Docs |
| Pierrot Lunaire | Bruce LaBruce | Susanne Sachsse | Musical/drama | Canada-German co-production; adaptation of Arnold Schoenberg's Pierrot Lunaire |
| Pompeii | Paul W. S. Anderson | Kit Harington, Emily Browning, Carrie-Anne Moss, Adewale Akinnuoye-Agbaje, Jessica Lucas, Jared Harris, Kiefer Sutherland | Historical-disaster romance | Golden Reel Award; Canadian Screen Awards - Art Direction/Production Design, Costumes, Sound, Visual Effects; Canada-German co-production |
| Preggoland | Jacob Tierney | Sonja Bennett, James Caan | Comedy | |
| Pretend We're Kissing | Matt Sadowski | Dov Tiefenbach, Tommie-Amber Pirie, Zoë Kravitz | Comedy-drama | |
| The Price We Pay | Harold Crooks | | Documentary | |
| Rampage: Capital Punishment | Uwe Boll | Brendan Fletcher, Lochlyn Munro | Action, crime-thriller | Canada-German co-production; direct to DVD |
| Reasonable Doubt | Peter Howitt | Dominic Cooper, Samuel L. Jackson, Gloria Reuben | Crime-thriller | |
| Rebel (Bihttoš) | Elle-Máijá Tailfeathers | | Documentary | |
| Roberta | Caroline Monnet | Marie Brassard, Julien Morin | Short drama | |
| Rock Paper Dice Enter | Shreela Chakrabartty | Kash Gauni | Crime-thriller | |
| Self(less) Portrait (Autoportrait sans moi) | Danic Champoux | | Documentary | |
| Seth's Dominion | Luc Chamberland | Canadian cartoonist Seth | National Film Board animated/live action documentary | Best animated feature film, Ottawa International Animation Film Festival |
| Sitting on the Edge of Marlene | Ana Valine | Suzanne Clément, Paloma Kwiatkowski, Callum Keith Rennie, Dakota Daulby | Drama | |
| Soif | Michèle Cournoyer | | Animated short | |
| Sol | Marie-Hélène Cousineau and Susan Avingaq | | Documentary | |
| Songs She Wrote About People She Knows | Kris Elgstrand | Arabella Bushnell, Brad Dryborough | Musical comedy | Made with U.S. financing |
| Stage Fright | Jerome Sable | Minnie Driver, Meat Loaf, Allie MacDonald | Horror musical | Made for Video on Demand |
| Stranger in a Cab (Ceci n'est pas un polar) | Patrick Gazé | Roy Dupuis, Christine Beaulieu, Sylvie Boucher | Drama | |
| Super Duper Alice Cooper | Sam Dunn, Scot McFadyen & Reginald Harkema | Alice Cooper | Documentary | Canadian Screen Awards - Feature Documentary, Best Editing in a Documentary |
| Swearnet: The Movie | Warren P. Sonoda | Mike Smith, John Paul Tremblay, Robb Wells | Comedy | |
| Sweeping Forward | Patricia MacDowell | Anne-Marie Saheb, Lydia Bouchard, Bénédicte Gobert, Sharon James, Melanie Elliot | Drama | |
| Taking My Parents to Burning Man | Joel Ashton McCarthy & Bryant H. Boesen | | Documentary | |
| Teen Lust | Blaine Thurier | Cary Elwes, Daryl Sabara, Emmanuelle Vaugier | Comedy | |
| To Russia with Love | Noam Gonick | Johnny Weir, Anastasia Bucsis, Belle Brockhoff, Blake Skjellerup | Documentary | |
| Trailer Park Boys: Don't Legalize It | Mike Clattenburg | John Paul Tremblay, Robb Wells, Mike Smith | Comedy | |
| Trick or Treaty? | Alanis Obomsawin | | National Film Board Documentary | Exploring Treaty 9 and Idle No More |
| Two 4 One | Maureen Bradley | Gavin Crawford, Naomi Snieckus, Gabrielle Rose | Romantic comedy-drama | |
| Uyghurs: Prisoners of the Absurd | Patricio Henríquez | | Documentary | |
| The Valley Below | Kyle Thomas | Kris Demeanor, Stephen Bogaert, Alana Hawley | Drama | |
| Violent | Andrew Huculiak | Dagny Backer Johnsen, Tor Halvor Halvorsen | Drama | VIFF - Best Canadian Feature Film, Best British Columbia Film; Leo Awards - Best Motion Picture, Best Direction, Best Screenwriting, Best Cinematography, Best Picture Editing, Best Visual Effects, Best Musical Score, Best Casting; Vancouver Film Critics Circle - Best First Film By A Canadian Director, Best British Columbia Film; Karlovy Vary International Film Festival Official Selection; San Sebastián International Film Festival Official Selection, Los Cabos International Film Festival Official Selection |
| The Wanted 18 | Paul Cowan & Amer Shomali | | Animated documentary produced with the National Film Board | Canada-France-Palestine co-production |
| We Were Wolves | Jordan Canning | Peter Mooney, Steve Cochrane, Lynda Boyd | Drama | |
| The Weatherman and the Shadowboxer | Randall Okita | | Animation/live action drama | |
| Wet Bum | Lindsay MacKay | Julia Sarah Stone, Leah Pinsent, Kenneth Welsh | Comedy-drama | |
| What Are We Doing Here? (Qu'est-ce qu'on fait ici ?) | Julie Hivon | Charles-Alexandre Dubé, Joëlle Paré Beaulieu, Sophie Desmarais, Guylaine Tremblay | Drama | |
| What We Have | Maxime Desmons | Maxime Desmons, Roberta Maxwell | Drama | |
| Where I'm From | Claude Demers | | National Film Board Documentary | |
| With Child | Titus Heckel | Kerry van der Griend | Drama | |
| WolfCop | Lowell Dean | Sarah Lind, Amy Matysio, Jesse Moss | Comedy-horror | |
| The Wolves (Les Loups) | Sophie Deraspe | Evelyne Brochu, Louise Portal, Benoît Gouin, Martin Dubreuil | Drama | |
| You're Sleeping Nicole (Tu dors Nicole) | Stéphane Lafleur | Marc-André Grondin, Fanny Mallette | Drama | Prix Jutra - Sound, Original Score |

== See also ==
- 2014 in Canada
- 2014 in Canadian television
