= List of films shown at Crazy8s =

The following is a list of films created through Crazy8s held each year in Vancouver, BC.

== Crazy8s 1999 ==
- The Rememberer directed by Coreen Mayrs and produced by Christopher Gora
- untitled directed by Harry Killas and produced by Paul Scherzer
- 8 Parts directed by Ryan Bonder

== Crazy8s 2000 ==
- Earliest Memory Exercise directed by Stacy Stewart Curtis
- Lift directed by Scott Weber
- My Life in 8 Minutes directed by Sandy Wilson
- Mr. Fortune’s Smile directed by Bruce Marchfelder
- Power of Persuasion Fly directed by James Dunnison

== Crazy8s 2001 ==
- happyland directed by Veda Hille
- Briggs directed by Bill Switzer
- The Waiting Room directed by Penelope Buitenhuis and produced by Asaf Benny and Isabelle Longnus
- Tundra directed by Allan Harmon and produced by Jason Cameron
- Along for the Ride directed by Michael Love

== Crazy8s 2002 ==
- Mary’s Stigmata directed by Rae Dawn Chong
- The Good Life directed by Peter Chrzanowski
- Candy From Strangers directed by Eric Johnson and produced by Jason Cameron
- Swimming Upstream directed by Bonnie Benwick and produced by Jason Cameron
- REM directed by Carl Bessai

== Crazy8s 2003 ==
- 50 Questions directed by Jacqueline Samuda and produced by Clare Hodge and Gerry Rutherford
- Danny and the Fairy G directed by Peter Stebbings
- Dogme Kung Fu! directed by Terry Mialkowsky and produced by Asha Gill and Ed Hatton
- 21st Century Scott directed by Matt Sinclair and produced by Samantha Morris
- Do Not Disturb directed by Asaf Benny and produced by Isabelle Longnus

== Crazy8s 2004 ==
- Man. Feel. Pain. directed by Dylan Akio Smith and produced by Wendy Russell
- My Father is an Actor directed by Sara McIntyre and produced by Naomi Wright
- Flush directed by Alec MacNeill Richardson & Niall MacNeill Richardson and produced by Seán Cummings
- Chemistry directed by Cameron Labine and produced by Marc Stephenson
- Zapruder vs. Sasquatch directed by Ed Hatton and produced by Krista Johnston

== Crazy8s 2005 ==
- 24/7 directed by Kelly-Ruth Mercier and produced by Bonnie Jean Mah and Nancy Welsh
- All In directed by Guy Judge and produced by Daljit DJ Parmar
- Crazy Late directed by Zach Lipovsky and produced by Chris Ferguson
- Sandra Gets Dumped directed by Tracy D Smith and produced by Sophie McGarry and Chad Allan Smith
- ...nettirwnU directed by Kaare Andrews and produced by Mel Weisbaum

== Crazy8s 2006 ==
- Breakdown directed by John Bolton and produced by Errin Lally
- Sand Castle directed by Katrin Bowen and produced by Tihemme Gagnon
- Fool’s Gold directed by Jordan Christianson and produced by Lauren Grant
- John Day Afternoon directed by Luke Divers and produced by Shawn Divers
- Ashes to Ashes directed by Samm Barnes
- Remission Impossible directed by Ken Hegan and produced by Nancy Welsh
- The Critic directed by Jaman Lloyd and produced by Chris Ferguson
- Circumference directed by CJ Wallis and produced by Michael David George and Marilyn Thomas

== Crazy8s 2008 ==
- Pi Day directed by Jon Anctil and produced by Scott Mainwood and Malcolm Oliver
- After the Beep directed by Lewis Bennett and Mark Boucher and produced by Chris Eastwood
- Under Pressure: A Story of Microscopic Stakes directed by Daneil DeVita & Mike Dinsmore and produced by Graham Wardle
- Bethany directed by Zach Gayne & Alex Essoe
- Verna directed by Jeffrey Hornung
- Nobody Special directed by Robert Kirbyson and produced by Tracey Nomura
- Minimum Wage, The Night Shift directed by Jeremy Maeers
- Nobody Special directed by Laura Dione Rooke

== Crazy8s 2009 ==
- Cash AToM directed by Tyson Hepburn and produced by John Driftmier
- The Mechanic directed by Michael Grand and produced by James Brown
- Mike Inc. directed by Jose Pablo Gonzalez and Paal Wilhelm Nesset and produced by Ryan Basaraba, Adrian Cox and Nilou Shahvarani
- Not Another Damn Musical directed by Chris Goldade and produced by Neil Dougall
- Riboflavin! directed by Blair Dykes
- Teaser directed by Lidia Stante

== Crazy8s 2010 ==
- Cat vs. Man directed by Zia Marashi and produced by Cole Hewlett and Mark MacDonald
- The Education of Wendy Wisconsin directed by Dwight Hartnett and produced by Pat Sayer
- Sad Bear directed by Liz Cairns and Joe LoBianco and produced by Erica Landrock, Erik Paulsson and Marc Stephenson
- Tunnel directed by Arianna McGregor and produced by David Jevons
- Sikat directed by Angelina Cantada and produced by Ita Kane-Wilson and Olesia Shewchuk
- Stupid Chainsaw Tricks directed by Kellie Ann Benz and produced by Christopher Shyer

== Crazy8s 2011 ==
- Dead Friends directed by Stephen W. Martin and produced by Kate Clarke, Alexander Glua and Katelyn Mann
- Funny Business directed by Russell Bennett and produced by Kate Green and Siobhan McCarthy
- Chained directed by Rehan Khokhar and produced by Matt Granger and Mikey Granger
- Run Dry directed by Sarah Crauder and Lindsay George and produced by Jordan Hall and Mélanie Lê Phan
- Colouring on the Walls directed by Shaun McKinlay and produced by Athan Merrick and Julie Stangeland
- Alchemy and Other Imperfections directed by Zachary Rothman and produced by Heather Lindsay

== Crazy8s 2012 ==
- A Mother’s Love directed by Camille Mitchell and produced by Jonathan Tammuz
- A Red Girl’s Reasoning directed by Elle-Máijá Tailfeathers and produced by Rose Stiffarm
- These Walls directed by Doreen Manuel and produced by Tamara Bell and Kirstie Satchwell
- Sleepy Stories directed by Andrew Rowe and produced by Laura Hope and Michael Rowe
- The Vessel directed by Marshall Axani and produced by Diana Donaldson and Graham Wardle
- The Weather Girl directed by Carleen Kyle and produced by Nathalie de Los Santos

== Crazy8s 2013 ==
- Braindamage directed by Matt Leaf and produced by Victoria Angell
- In the Deep directed by Nimisha Mukerji and produced by Haydn Wazelle and Anand Raghavan
- Manstruation directed by Ryan Haneman and produced by Derek Green
- Stewing directed by Sean Tyson and produced by Patrick Currie
- Under the Bridge of Fear directed by Mackenzie Gray and produced by Ryan Catherwood and Simona Atias
- When I Saw You directed by Jane Hancock and produced by Nicholas Carella and Michelle Ouellet

== Crazy8s 2014 ==
- Bedbugs: A Musical Love Story directed by Matthew Kowalchuk and produced by Sean Tyson
- Body Language directed by Maéva Thibeault and produced by Jon Warne
- Dial Y for Yesterday directed by Greg Crompton and produced by Darren Borrowman
- Earthlickers directed by Tony Mirza and produced by Justine Warrington, Alison Araya, Jim McKeown and Keli Moore
- Mattress directed by Michelle Kee and produced by David Kelso and Emma Peterson
- Sacrifice directed by Ryan Atimoyoo and produced by Peggy Thompson

== Crazy8s 2015 ==
- Kindergarten: Da Bin Ich Wieder directed by Aubrey Arnason and Kalyn Miles and produced by Laura Toplass
- One Last Ride directed by Caitlin Byrnes and produced by Jordan Barber, Caitlin Byrnes and Kyle Hollett
- Outside the Lines directed by Scott Belyea and produced by Keli Moore and David Rice
- The Twisted Slipper directed by Angie Nolan and produced by Siobhan McCarthy and Katie Schaitel
- Under a Glass Moon directed by Mo Soliman and produced by Brent McCorkle
- The Wolf who Came to Dinner directed by Jem Garrard and produced by Michael Khazen

== Crazy8s 2016 ==
- A Family of Ghosts directed by Shannon Kohli and produced by Rob Meekison
- Grocery Store Action Movie directed by Matthew Campbell and produced by Ryan Silva, David Kaye and Jameson Parker
- I Love You So Much It's Killing Them directed by Joel Ashton McCarthy and produced by Nach Dudsdeemaytha, Keli Moore and Marena Dix
- Iteration 1 directed by Jesse Lupini and produced by Arshia Navabi and Mert Sari
- Meet Cute directed by Patrick Currie and produced by Michele Picard, Michelle Morris and Yogi Omar
- Trying directed by Shauna Johannesen and produced by Lulu Pan

== Crazy8s 2017 ==
- Anh Hung directed by Lelinh Du and produced by Frazer MacLean
- Cypher directed by Lawrence Le Lam and produced by Nach Dudsdeemaytha
- No Reservations directed by Trevor Carroll and produced by Ben Mallin
- The Prince directed by Kyra Zagorsky and produced by Patrick Sabongui, Janene Carleton, Danielle Stott-Roy and Robin Nielson
- The Undertaker's Son directed by Heath Affolter, Jon Affolter and Thomas Affolter and produced by Rebeka Herron, Heath Affolter, Jon Affolter, Thomas Affolter and Nathan Affolter
- Woodman directed by Mike Jackson and produced by Rory Tucker, Rozlyn Young and Avi Glanzer

== Crazy8s 2018 ==
- Bordered directed by Anaïsa Visser and produced by Darren Devlin & Marco Bossow
- CC directed by Kailey Spear & Sam Spear and produced by Natasha Wehn
- Extra-Ordinary Amy directed by Christopher Graham and produced by Kris McRonney
- Gemini directed by Mily Mumford and produced by Phil Planta and Mayumi Yoshida
- Shuttlecock directed by Melanie Jones and produced by Kristyn Stilling
- Small Fish directed by Maxime Beauchamp and produced by Kent Donguines

== Crazy8s 2019 ==
- Ada directed by Steven Kammerer and produced by Amanda Konkin, Camille Hollett-French, Michael Khazen, Otto Mak and Kathleen Staples
- Hatch directed by Heather Perluzzo and produced by Robin Macabulos
- Idols Never Die directed by Jerome Yoo and produced by Mike Johnston, Thomas Affolter, Derek Kwan and Lawrence Le Lam
- Parabola directed by Lee Shorten and produced by Phil Planta and Brittany Lum-Cho
- The Mirror directed by Nessa Aref and produced by Madeleine Davis, Gabrielle Lambert and Sinead Hughes
- Unkept directed by Michael P. Vidler and produced by Pawan Deol

== Crazy8s 2020 ==
- Itsy Bitsy Spider directed by Brodi-Jo Scalise and produced by Josh Farnworth
- Mr. James Is Dead directed by Daniel Irving and Josh Aries and produced by Luisa Muniz and Mara Cruz
- Sol directed by Andy Alvarez and produced by Kate McCallum and Mike Johnston
- The Quieting directed by Ali Liebert and produced by Avi Glanzer, Nicolas Ayerbe Barona and Rebecca Steele
- The Substitute directed by Malibu Taetz and produced by David Mora Perea
- This Is a Period Piece directed by Bruna Arbex and produced by Karina Villela & Andrea Widjajanto

== Crazy8s 2021 ==
- Baba directed by Jay Kamal and produced by Javier Badillo and Panta Mosleh
- Crumbs directed by Jessey Nelson & Cody Nelson and produced by Joel Panas, Kyle Siemens, Rami Kahlon
- Cuello directed by Sebastian Ortiz Wilkins and produced by Moheb Jindran & Allen Xu
- iDorothy directed by Luvia Petersen and produced by Amanda Konkin
- Mom Vs Machine directed by Tesh Guttikonda and produced by Praneet Akilla, Bhavesh Chauhan, Kashif Pasta and Shyam Valera
- Tryst directed by Rachel Rose and produced by Mohamed Ibrahim, Eli Morris and Alisa Luke

== Crazy8s 2022 ==
- Consumer directed by Stephanie Izsak and produced by Kevin Keegan, Lori Watt, Nic Altobelli and Keara Barnes
- Imran and Alykhan directed by Shakil Jessa and produced by Sinéad Grewcock and Kora Vanderli
- The Faraway Place directed by Kenny Welsh and produced by Po-Chun Chen
- The Gold Teeth directed by Alireza Kazemipour and produced by Matisse Weyler-Hubert
- Undeveloped directed by Derek MacDonald and produced by Tyler Twiss
- Weeds Are Flowers, Too directed by Kay Shioma Metchie and produced by Vivian Davidson-Castro, Valerie Lopez and Alyssa Kostello

== Crazy8s 2023 ==
- Hellmark directed by Jessica Lauren Doucet and produced by Eloise Cameron-Smith
- High End Dying directed by Helen Liu and produced by Nancy Kamar, Melanie J. Germain and Moheb Jindran
- I Can't Go On directed by Brenna Goodwin-McCabe and produced by Dominique Roy
- Meditation 4 Black Women directed by Rukiya Bernard and produced by Teana-Marie Smith, Mariam Barry, Jessie Anthony, Andy Hodgson and Rukiya Bernard
- Passiflora directed by Gabriel Souza Nunes and produced by Aries Ceta and Elaine Yan
- ZIP directed by Ava Maria Safai and produced by Nicco Graham, Christopher Alexander Cook, Mandana Mehrghorbani, Ava Maria Safai, Caylee Watrin and Brook James

== Crazy8s 2024 ==
- Astronaut directed by Kevin Cheng and produced by Luke Vandenberg and Stephanie Joan
- DTF? directed by Jess McLeod and produced by Hana Huggins and Jess McLeod
- Gone Abroad directed by Kevin Ang and produced by Moheb Jindran
- Our Long Goodbye directed by Dave Beamish and produced by Erin Morgan, Christina McInulty and Sarah Alma Angelle
- Toe Pick directed by Teresa Alfeld and produced by Kiefer Doerksen, Melissa James, Thea Loo, Taylor Johansson and Natalie Murao
- What Are You Supposed To Do With Your Hands? directed by Larissa Thompson and produced by Amanda D’Silva

== Crazy8s 2025 ==
- My Mother, The Zombie directed by Samantha Pineda and produced by Lila Ferradans
- Our Monsters directed by Mia Petrovic and produced by Steven Hu, Tristan Miura and Jordan J. Rivera
- Red Light Rebel directed by Hannah Yang and produced by Ava Maria Safai
- The Reveal directed by Jackie Hoffart and produced by Andrea Feltrin
- W7éyle (Moon's Wife) directed and produced by Amanda Wandler
- Headcase (fka Where Is My Head?) directed by Spencer Zimmerman and produced by Siobhan Connors, Spencer Zimmerman and Jessica To

== Crazy8s 2026 ==
- The Decision directed by Cory Thibert and produced by Jelian Quincina
- The Last Caller directed by Mariel Calvo and produced by Kris Mish and Miguel Da Ponte
- Full Asian directed by Ely Davidson and produced by Ione Fernando, Madeline Zimmerman and Kevin Cheng
- Gone Viral directed by Katrina Reynolds and produced by Mariam Barry, Adrian Neblett, Maritama Carlson, Jennifer Duong, Renata Calderon and Mimi Dejene
- Mould directed by Morgan Abele and produced by Noah Rosellini
- The Thing Inside Her directed by Jacki Gunn and Della Haddock and produced by Lizzi Pedersen
