= Crazy8s =

Film festival

- Location: Vancouver, British Columbia, Canada
- Founded: 1999
- No. of films: fewest, 3 (1999); most, 8 (2006, 2008)
- Website: crazy8s.film

Crazy8s is a filmmaking competition and festival held annually in Vancouver, British Columbia, Canada. It provides funding and support to local filmmakers to shoot and edit a short film in eight days. It has been called one of the best platforms for emerging filmmakers in Vancouver and has produced over 100 short films.

== History ==
Crazy8s was founded in 1999 by Andrew Williamson. Teams of filmmakers pitch their concepts to industry professionals. Around 200 teams annually submit a video pitch, 40 are then chosen to pitch in-person to a jury, after that 12 teams advance to the script stage before six finalists are announced in early January.

After fine-tuning their concepts and delivering revised scripts, 6 winners are chosen to receive $1,000 and a production package and have three days to shoot followed by five days of post-production. Most of the approximately 2,000 people involved are industry professionals.

Notable past participants include Kaare Andrews, Samm Barnes, Carl Bessai, James Dunnison, Mackenzie Gray, Matthew Kowalchuk, CJ Wallis, Ali Liebert, Zach Lipovsky, Elan Mastai, Camille Mitchell, Nimisha Mukerji, Chris Goldade, Graham Wardle and Kyra Zagorsky.

Dylan Akio Smith's Man. Feel. Pain. won Best Canadian Short Film at the 2004 Toronto International Film Festival. Zach Lipovsky's Crazy Late is credited with helping earn him a spot on the reality show On the Lot. Earthlickers and Bed Bugs: A Musical Love Story later screened at the 2014 Whistler Film Festival. Joel Ashton McCarthy's I Love You So Much It's Killing Them won Best Short Film at Bruce Campbell's third annual GroovyFest. The 20th anniversary edition began February 8, 2019 and premiered February 23.

== Galas ==
The finished films are screened at a Gala Screening followed by an afterparty. The 2010 gala was held March 27 at the Vogue Theatre. The 2014 competition attracted 154 applicants. The 2015 gala screening was held February 28 at The Centre For Performing Arts and had 196 applicants. It was hosted by Diana Bang, attracted 1,700 people and featured the band No Sinner at the afterparty. The 2016 gala screening was held February 27 at The Centre For Performing Arts and was hosted by Ellie Harvie. The 2017 competition attracted 216 teams and will screen the final six films February 25 at The Centre For Performing Arts with an official afterparty at Science World.
