= Night of the Reaper =

2025 film directed by Brandon Christensen

- Promotional release poster
- Directed by: Brandon Christensen
- Written by: Brandon Christensen; Ryan Christensen
- Starring: Jessica Clement; Ryan Robbins; Summer H. Howell; Keegan Connor Tracy; Matty Finochi; Max Christensen; Bryn Samuel; Ben Cockell
- Cinematography: Clayton Moore
- Production companies: Not the Funeral Home; Superchill
- Distributed by: Shudder
- Release date: September 19, 2025
- Running time: 93 minutes
- Country: United States
- Language: English

Night of the Reaper is a 2025 slasher film directed by Brandon Christensen, starring Jessica Clement, Ryan Robbins, Summer H. Howell, Keegan Connor Tracy, Matty Finochi, Max Christensen, Bryn Samuel, and Ben Cockell. The film follows a woman (Clement) who takes a job as a babysitter before finding herself being threatened. Meanwhile, the sheriff (Robbins) obtains a tape containing footage of previous murders.

== Premise ==
A babysitter named Emily is killed by a masked figure. Subsequently, college student Deena agrees to babysit the young son of a sheriff named Rodney Arnold, who's dealing with a mystery involving snuff films delivered to him.

== Cast ==
- Jessica Clement as Deena Golding
- Ryan Robbins as Sheriff Rodney Arnold, a town sheriff and Max's father
- Summer H. Howell as Emily Golding, Deena's younger sister who was killed by The Reaper
- Keegan Connor Tracy as Elizabeth "Beth" Talbot
- Matty Finochio as Officer Butch Cassidy
- Max Christensen as Max Arnold, Rodney's son
- Ben Cockell as Chad Bolton, Willis's friend
- David Feehan as The Reaper
- Bryn Samuel as Willis Hanover, Deena's friend
- Savannah Miller as Haddie McAllister, Deena's best friend
- Susan Serrao as Sheila
- Huxley Fisher as Mark
- Isla Spencer as Marina
- Sofie Kane as Dottie
- Deborah Ferguson as Mrs. Dunham
- Blair Young as Dr. Hall
- Jocelyn Chugg as Abby
- Lonni Olson as Walt
- Drake Seipert as Connor Davis

== Release ==
Night of the Reaper was released in the United States on September 19, 2025. It is distributed by Shudder.

== Reception ==
On the review aggregator website Rotten Tomatoes, 78% of 27 critics' reviews are positive. Lloyd Farley of Collider gave the film a mostly positive review, saying that (while requiring "a level of suspension of disbelief") it succeeds in "subverting expectations" and "keep[ing] the audience engaged, mystified, and on the edge of their seats." Cole Groth of FandomWire gave the film a mildly positive review, calling it "a fine, 90-minute distraction that offers just enough mystery and atmosphere to keep dedicated horror fans engaged."
