= Ben Cotton =

Canadian film and television actor

- Born: July 26, 1975 (age 50); Edmonton, Alberta, Canada
- Occupation: Actor
- Years active: 1999–present

Ben Cotton (born July 26, 1975) is a Canadian film and television actor. His most notable roles are on the TV series Stargate Atlantis playing scientist Dr. Kavanagh, his portrayal of "Leon Bell" in the game Dead Rising 2, Shane Pierce, the local townie, on CBS's Harper's Island and Lt. Coker Fasjovik in Battlestar Galactica: Blood and Chrome.

== Selected filmography ==
- Smallville (2002) as Paul
- Stargate Atlantis (2004–2009) as Dr. Kavanagh
- The 4400: Episode 2x05 Suffer The Children (2005) as Dewey
- The Cabin Movie (2005)
- A Simple Curve (2005)
- Heartfelt Café (2006) as Romantic Boy
- Family in Hiding (2006) as Travis
- Slither (2006) as Charlie
- Whistler (2007) as Dean Webber
- Supernatural (2007) as Businessman/Pride
- Blood Ties: 2x08 The Good, The Bad and The Ugly (2007) as Kelly
- Flash Gordon : 1x14 Stand and Deliver (2007) as Bounty Hunter
- Battlestar Galactica: Razor (2007) as Terrified Man
- The Day the Earth Stood Still (2008) as Trucker
- Robson Arms (2008) as Joel
- Mayerthorpe (2008) as Leo Johnston
- jPod (2008) as Tim
- Messages Deleted (2009) as Sarge
- Christmas in Canaan (2009) as Buddy
- Riese the Series (2009) as Herrick
- Harper's Island (2009) as Shane Pierce
- Hellcats (2010) as Travis Guthrie
- 30 Days of Night: Dark Days (2010) as Dane
- The Boy Who Cried Werewolf (2010) as Cab Driver
- Doppelgänger Paul (2011)
- Arrow (2012) as Dave Hackett
- Alcatraz (2012) as Inmate
- Battlestar Galactica: Blood & Chrome (2012) as Coker Fasjovik
- Love at the Thanksgiving Day Parade (2012) as Brian
- Fringe (2012) as Impound Clerk
- Once Upon a Time in Wonderland (2013-2014) as Tweedle #2
- Cinemanovels (2013) as Ben
- Lawrence & Holloman (2013) as Lawrence
- Songs She Wrote About People She Knows (2014) as Jason
- Kid Cannabis (2014) as Joe Loya
- iZombie (TV series) (2015) as Blaine's henchman
- The Unseen (2016) as Crisby
- Mars (2016) as Captain Ben Sawyer
- Gregoire (2017) as Steve
- Crown and Anchor (2018)
- Limetown (2019) as Terry Hilkins
- Cold Pursuit (2019) as Windex
- Hammer (2019) as Adams
- An Awkward Balance (2020) as Mike
- Resident Alien (2021–2025) as Jimmy
- Debris (2021) as Loeb
- The Dragon Prince (2022–2024) as Rex Igneous (voice)
- The Night Agent (2023) as Wick
