= Marilyn (2011 film) =

- Directed by: Christopher Petry
- Written by: Christopher Petry
- Starring: Ryan Robbins; Allison Mack
- Cinematography: Bruce Borland
- Edited by: Kirby innah
- Release date: December 3, 2011 (Whistler Film Festival)
- Running time: 96 minutes
- Country: Canada
- Language: English

Marilyn is a 2011 romantic crime drama film written and directed by Christopher Petry, starring Ryan Robbins and Allison Mack. It is based upon a story written by Paddy Mitchell, a notorious bank robber who was part of the Stopwatch Gang, who appeared on many of the top FBI most wanted lists during his tenure as a criminal. The film is noted for having been released via Distrify, a video on demand system which allows for the distributor to make money from the film via either rental or purchase.

== Plot ==
Michael Grant (Ryan Robbins), is a paranoid and precarious criminal on the run, who regretfully takes in a twenty-year-old girl, Marilyn (Allison Mack), however, it is constantly hinted that she may be just a teenager.

== Cast ==
- Ryan Robbins as Michael Grant
- Allison Mack as Marilyn
- Mike Dopud as Romantic Trucker
- Juan Riedinger as Motel Clerk

Only Robbins and Mack are the two cast members who receive more than a few minutes of screen time, as the other two listed are the only other cast members who appear in more than one scene, however briefly.

== Reception ==
Through its numerous festivals, it has won the best male lead performance in the 2012 Leo Awards. It was also nominated for the best Canadian feature film in the Whistler Film Festival and was also nominated for the discovery award in the Calgary International Film Festival.

== Release ==
After touring numerous festivals, Marilyn was finally released in 2013 via Video on Demand.
