= Doppelgänger Paul =

2011 film

- Film poster
- Directed by: Dylan Akio Smith; Kris Elgstrand
- Written by: Kris Elgstrand
- Produced by: Katherine Hazen; Oliver Linsley
- Starring: Brad Dryborough; Tygh Runyan
- Cinematography: Craig Trudeau
- Edited by: Alex Leigh Barker; Aram Coen
- Production companies: Doghouse Films; The Whatever Institute
- Release date: September 12, 2011 (TIFF)
- Running time: 81 minutes
- Country: Canada
- Language: English

Doppelgänger Paul, or A Film About How Much I Hate Myself is a Canadian comedy film, directed by Dylan Akio Smith and Kris Elgstrand and released in 2011.

The film stars Tygh Runyan as Karl, a lonely man who decides following a near-death experience that Paul (Brad Dryborough) is his doppelgänger, even though the two men look nothing alike. Although Paul agrees to edit Karl's unpublished manuscript A Book About How Much I Hate Myself, their burgeoning friendship is tested when he edits it in ways that Karl takes as an insult to his creativity; however, they must reunite to undertake a road trip to Portland, Oregon when the book is unexpectedly and inexplicably published several months later by a different pair of dissimilar doppelgängers whom neither man can recall having met.

The film's cast also includes Arabella Bushnell, Ben Cotton and Bronwen Smith.

The film premiered at the 2011 Toronto International Film Festival, before going into commercial release in 2012.
