= Pure (Canadian TV series) =

- Genre: Crime drama
- Created by: Michael Amo
- Directed by: Ken Girotti
- Starring: Ryan Robbins; A. J. Buckley; Peter Outerbridge; Rosie Perez
- Country of origin: Canada
- No. of seasons: 2
- No. of episodes: 12

Production
- Production companies: Two East Production; Cineflix

Original release
- Network: CBC Television (season 1); Super Channel (season 2)
- Release: January 9, 2017 – July 2, 2019

Pure is a Canadian television drama series that first aired on CBC Television in January and February 2017, and subsequently on Super Channel. The show stars Ryan Robbins as Noah Funk, a Mennonite pastor working undercover within an organized crime network in order to clean up a drug trafficking problem in his community. The show also stars A. J. Buckley, Peter Outerbridge, Alex Paxton-Beesley, and Rosie Perez.

Pure is produced by Two East Productions and Cineflix Media and is directed by Ken Girotti.

Showrunner Michael Amo stated that he pitched the show to television networks in the 2000s but "didn't get any takers". It is inspired by the operations of a Mennonite organized crime ring that smuggled cocaine and marijuana from Mexico to Canada and the United States.

The series premiere was watched by 858,000 Canadian viewers. On April 12, 2017, the show was picked up by Hulu in the United States. WGN America acquired the US television rights to the series in August 2017.

Initially, Pure was not renewed for a second season; however, in April 2018 the show was picked up by Super Channel, CBC, Hulu, and WGN America for a season two with six episodes, set to premiere in 2019. The series is scheduled to debut on WGN America on May 28, 2019.

In June 2018, Super Channel announced that actors Alyson Hannigan, Christopher Heyerdahl, Zoie Palmer, and Victor Gomez were joining the production for Season 2.

== Cast ==
The cast includes:

- Ryan Robbins as Noah Funk, a pastor
- Alex Paxton-Beesley as Anna Funk, his wife
- Gord Rand as Abel Funk, his brother
- Dylan Everett as Isaac Funk, his son
- Jessica Clement as Tina Funk, his daughter
- A. J. Buckley as Bronco Novak, a police detective
- Peter Outerbridge as Eli Voss, a gang leader
- Rosie Perez as Phoebe O'Reilly, a DEA agent
- Alyson Hannigan as Esther Dunkel
- Christopher Heyerdahl as Augustus Nickel
- Zoie Palmer as Valerie Krochack
- Alex Crowther as Johan Fehr
- Brian Downey as Bishop Bergen

== Episodes ==
Season	Episodes	Originally released	
Season	Episodes	First released	Last released
1	6	January 9, 2017	February 13, 2017
2	6	May 28, 2019	July 2, 2019

=== Season 1 (2017) ===
No. overall	No. in season	Title	Directed by	Written by	Original release date	Canada viewers (millions)
1	1	"Ordination"	Ken Girotti	Michael Amo	January 9, 2017	1.021
2	2	"The Singing"	Ken Girotti	Michael Amo	January 16, 2017	N/A
Having agreed to accept a shipment of drugs from Mexican gang boss Eli Voss, Pastor Noah faces a crisis when the shipment is lost.
3	3	"As One"	Ken Girotti	Michael Amo	January 23, 2017	N/A
With the drugs not easily accessed, Pastor Noah turns to a group of buyers led by Crowbar for help - but is unable to promise them 25% off the drugs as they demand. Meanwhile police detective Bronco re-asserts himself, demanding a fourth call on Noah's allegiance. Noah's son announces his intention to seek baptism.
4	4	"Funeral"	Ken Girotti	Michael Amo	January 30, 2017	N/A
With substantially more dead bodies than foreseen, Noah strives to face the enormity of his own place in the crime gang even with his good intentions; meanwhile his wife has chosen a path to intimidate a local community member that brings down new sin on the enterprise.
5	5	"Communion"	Ken Girotti	Michael Amo	February 6, 2017	N/A
6	6	"Baptism"	Ken Girotti	Michael Amo	February 13, 2017	N/A

=== Season 2 (2019) ===
No. overall	No. in season	Title	Directed by	Written by	Original release date	U.S. viewers (millions)
7	1	"Excommunication"	Ken Girotti	Michael Amo	May 28, 2019	0.241
8	2	"Faspa"	Ken Girotti	Andrew Wreggitt	June 4, 2019	0.219
9	3	"Return of the Lamb"	T.W. Peacocke	Waneta Storms	June 11, 2019	0.107
10	4	"The Proposal"	T.W. Peacocke	Michael Amo	June 18, 2019	0.166
11	5	"Penance"	Ken Girotti	Andrew Wreggitt	June 25, 2019	0.195
12	6	"Wedding"	Ken Girotti	Michael Amo	July 2, 2019	0.194

== Setting ==
Though filmed in Nova Scotia, Pure is set in a fictional town called Antioch in southern Ontario, and during the first season, it also included the U.S. state of Texas and the Mexican state of Chihuahua.

== Accolades ==
Year	Award	Category	Nominee	Result	Ref
2017	ACTRA Maritimes Award	Outstanding Male Actor in a Supporting Role	Gary Levert	Nominated	
2017	Directors Guild of Canada Awards	Outstanding Directorial Achievement in Dramatic Series	Ken Girotti (episode: "Ordination")	Nominated	
2018	Canadian Screen Awards	Best Dramatic Series	Pure	Nominated	
2018	Canadian Screen Awards	Best Direction, Drama Series	Ken Girotti (episode: "Ordination")	Nominated	
2018	Canadian Screen Awards	Best Original Music, Fiction	Jonathan Goldsmith (episode: "Ordination")	Nominated	
2018	Screen Nova Scotia Awards	Best TV Series	Pure	Won	
