= The Cabin Movie =

2005 film

- Directed by: Dylan Akio Smith
- Written by: Kris Elgstrand
- Produced by: Rob Riley
- Starring: Arabella Bushnell; Ben Cotton; Brad Dryborough; Ryan Robbins; Justine Warrington; Erin Wells
- Cinematography: James Liston
- Edited by: Chris Bizzocchi
- Music by: Clinton Shorter
- Production companies: Cabin Movie Productions; Hybrid Films
- Distributed by: Mongrel Media
- Release date: September 15, 2005 (TIFF)
- Running time: 90 minutes
- Country: Canada
- Language: English
- Budget: $10,000

The Cabin Movie is a 2005 Canadian comedy-drama film directed by Dylan Akio Smith, written by Kris Elgstrand, and starring Arabella Bushnell, Ben Cotton, Brad Dryborough, Ryan Robbins, Justine Warrington, and Erin Wells. The film centres on a group of friends who try to reignite their lackluster sex lives by renting a cabin in the woods to have an orgy and record it as an amateur porn film.

== Plot ==
Maria, a married couple who have not had sex in a year, decide to invite two other couples to an orgy to spice up their sex lives. However, Mark and Katherine arrive dealing with relationship baggage that complicates their ability to participate, with Mark spending much of the event outside on the deck, while Jason has actually broken up with the girlfriend who was formerly part of the group's circle of friends, and instead arrives with his new love interest Ginny, a bisexual woman the rest of the group have never met.

== Cast ==
- Arabella Bushnell as Maria
- Ben Cotton as Jason
- Brad Dryborough as Mark
- Ryan Robbins as Ken
- Justine Warrington as Ginny
- Erin Wells as Katherine

== Distribution ==
The film premiered at the 2005 Toronto International Film Festival. In 2006, it was one of the first Canadian films to be carried by Blockbuster Video in its Festival Collection.
