= An Awkward Balance =

2020 Canadian comedy film

- Film poster
- Directed by: David Milchard
- Written by: Kris Elgstrand
- Produced by: Dylan Collingwood; Robert Mitchell; David Milchard; Christina Sicoli
- Starring: Ben Cotton; Christina Sicoli; Stephen Lobo; Sara Canning
- Cinematography: Peter Wilke
- Edited by: Rafi Spifak
- Music by: Jeff Gladstone; David Milchard
- Production companies: Concept Productions; Rare Little Bird Pictures; Tilt 9 Entertainment
- Release date: September 24, 2020 (VIFF)
- Running time: 87 minutes
- Country: Canada
- Language: English

An Awkward Balance, originally released as Fucking Idiots before being retitled, is a Canadian comedy film, directed by David Milchard and released in 2020. The film stars Ben Cotton and Christina Sicoli as Mike and Sara, a couple who are embarrassed by their lack of financial self-control after going on a spending spree that has left them virtually broke; they approach their friend Paul (Stephen Lobo) to administer aversion therapy in an attempt to curb their spending habits, only to be interrupted by the arrival of Venice (Sara Canning), a prostitute to whom Paul himself also owes a large unpaid debt.

The film's screenplay was written by Kris Elgstrand.

The film premiered at the 2020 Vancouver International Film Festival under the Fucking Idiots title.
