= Ryan Robbins =

Canadian actor (born 1972)

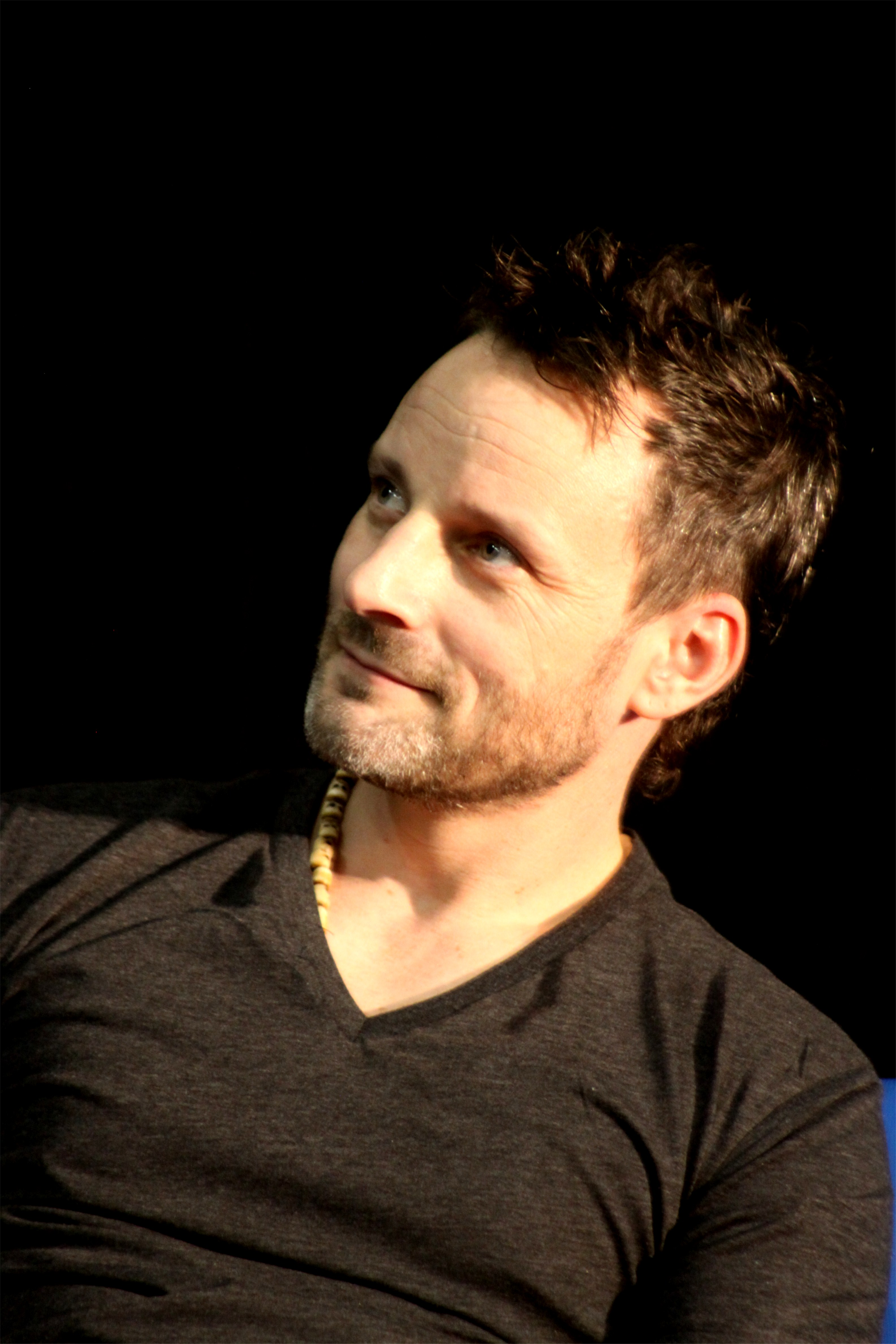
- Robbins in February 2011
- Born: Ryan John Currier; November 26, 1972 (age 53); Victoria, British Columbia, Canada
- Occupation: Actor
- Years active: 1994–present

Ryan John Currier (born November 26, 1972), better known as Ryan Robbins, is a Canadian actor.

== Early life ==
Robbins was born in Victoria, British Columbia.

== Career ==
Robbins is known for his roles as Ladon Radim in Stargate Atlantis, Henry Foss on Sanctuary and is the only actor to have played two different characters (not counting different incarnations of Cylon models as different characters) in the re-imagined Battlestar Galactica, having originally appeared in the 2003 Battlestar Galactica miniseries, with heavy makeup and prosthetics to age him, as the Colonial officer assigned to Armistice Station, followed by a recurring role as Charlie Connor in the third and fourth seasons of the Battlestar Galactica 2004–2009 TV series. Robbins later played Diego in the 2010 Battlestar Galactica prequel series Caprica.

Robbins has also guest starred in the TV series jPod as Alistair Parish and as Wendell on the Canadian series The Guard. In 2011 he played the role of John Grey in the film Apollo 18. He starred as Rand in Riese, Brad Tonkin in seasons 3 and 4 of Continuum and Tector in Falling Skies. In 2015 he had a recurring role on Arrow. He has a lead role in the Canadian series Pure.

Later, Robbins was cast as Agent Zeke "Zero" Rosenberg — a soldier, and a hypermasculine member of the Global Response and Intelligence Team — in the Sniper film series, making the character's debut in Sniper: Assassin's End (2020). In the 2026 Netflix series Little House on the Prairie he played the role of Russell Kind.

== Filmography ==
=== Film ===
| Year | Title | Role | Notes |
|---|---|---|---|
| 1997 | Horsey | Simon Leigh | |
| 1999 | Late Night Sessions | Ben | |
| 2001 | Turbulence 3: Heavy Metal | Tor | Direct-to-video film |
| 2001 | L.A.P.D.: To Protect and to Serve | Video Director | |
| 2002 | Liberty Stands Still | Fidgety Dude | |
| 2002 | Stark Raving Mad | Seedy Guy | |
| 2003 | Paycheck | Husband | |
| 2004 | Walking Tall | Travis | |
| 2004 | Catwoman | Bartender | |
| 2004 | Man. Feel. Pain. | Clint | Short film |
| 2005 | When Jesse Was Born | Harold Ferrell | Short film |
| 2005 | Behind the Camera: The Unauthorized Story of 'Mork & Mindy' | Street Performer | |
| 2005 | The Cabin Movie | Ken | |
| 2007 | Taming Tammy | Frances | |
| 2007 | Aliens vs. Predator: Requiem | Truck Driver | |
| 2008 | Sheltered Life | David Nash | |
| 2008 | Passengers | Dean | |
| 2009 | Smile of April | Jack | |
| 2009 | Manson, My Name Is Evil | Charlie Manson / Leslie's Dad | |
| 2009 | Collide | Nigel | Short film |
| 2010 | Unrivaled | Brian Waite | |
| 2010 | Wrecked | George Weaver | |
| 2011 | Vampire | Kevin Grant | |
| 2011 | Apollo 18 | Lt Col. John Grey | |
| 2011 | Marilyn | Michael Grant | |
| 2011 | Everything and Everyone | Noah | |
| 2011 | Suffer | Logan | Short film |
| 2012 | Cold Blooded | Cordero | |
| 2012 | Kill for Me | Detective Ferris | Direct-to-video |
| 2014 | Reasonable Doubt | Jimmy Logan | |
| 2014 | Seventh Son | Barkeep | |
| 2016 | The Confirmation | Trout | |
| 2016 | Warcraft | Karos | |
| 2016 | Spectral | Sgt. Comstock | |
| 2016 | Life on the Line | Eugene | |
| 2018 | Scorched Earth | Thomas Jackson | |
| 2018 | Boundaries | Jim | |
| 2019 | Daughter | Marc | |
| 2020 | Coffee & Kareem | The Money Guy | |
| 2020 | Sniper: Assassin's End | Agent Zeke "Zero" Rosenberg | Direct-to-video |
| 2022 | Sniper: Rogue Mission | Agent Zeke "Zero" Rosenberg | Direct-to-video |
| 2023 | Sniper: G.R.I.T. – Global Response & Intelligence Team | Agent Zeke "Zero" Rosenberg | Direct-to-video |
| 2025 | Sniper: The Last Stand | Agent Zeke "Zero" Rosenberg | Direct-to-video |
| 2025 | Night of the Reaper | Sheriff Rodney Arnold | |
| 2026 | Sniper: No Nation | Agent Zeke "Zero" Rosenberg | Direct-to-video |

=== Television ===
| Year | Title | Role | Notes |
|---|---|---|---|
| 1998 | Cold Squad | Chimp | Episode: "Stanley Caron" |
| 1998–1999 | Seven Days | Red | 2 episodes |
| 1999 | Millennium | Jed | Episode: "The Sound of Snow" |
| 1999 | Strange World | Bledsoe | Episode: "Azrael's Breed" |
| 1999 | The Net | Incredible Chill Shirt | Episode: "Chem Lab" |
| 2000 | Big Sound | Eddie Valor | TV series |
| 2000 | Just Deal | Rob / Manager | Episode: "With the Band" |
| 2000–2001 | Dark Angel | Arnie Haas | 2 episodes |
| 2001 | The Chris Isaak Show | Deke | Episode: "The Real Me" |
| 2001 | The Outer Limits | Richard | Episode: "Time to Time" |
| 2001 | Wolf Lake | Fletcher | Episode: "Meat the Parents" |
| 2001 | The Miracle of the Cards | Reggie | Television film |
| 2002 | Taken | Lt. Lou Johnson | Episode: "Beyond the Sky" |
| 2002 | Jeremiah | William Stauber | Episode: "The Bag" |
| 2002 | Beyond Belief: Fact or Fiction | Phillip Kirby | Segment: "The Mentor" |
| 2003 | The Twilight Zone | Tony | Episode: "The Path" |
| 2003 | Smallville | Louis Leery Jr. | Episode: "Exile" |
| 2003 | Battlestar Galactica | Armistice Officer | Miniseries; 2 episodes |
| 2004 | Kingdom Hospital | Dave Hooman | 3 episodes |
| 2004 | The Days | Mr. Marley | 2 episodes |
| 2004 | Dead Like Me | James Allen | Episode: "Hurry" |
| 2004–2006 | Stargate Atlantis | Ladon Radim | 5 episodes |
| 2005 | Into the West | 'Skate' Guthrie | Episode: "Manifest Destiny" |
| 2005 | Supernatural | Travis Weaver | Episode: "Bugs" |
| 2005 | Romeo! | Hacksaw | Episode: "Good Press" |
| 2006 | The Collector | Freddie Grimshaw | Episode: "The Jockey" |
| 2006 | The L Word | Bus Stop Man | Episode: "Losing the Light" |
| 2006 | The Evidence | Ron | Episode: "Borrowed Time" |
| 2006 | Saved | | Episode: "A Day in the Life" |
| 2006 | Blade: The Series | Sands | 2 episodes |
| 2006 | Alice, I Think | Bob | 13 episodes |
| 2006 | A Little Thing Called Murder | Shawn Little | Television film |
| 2006–2009 | Battlestar Galactica | Charlie Connor | Recurring role |
| 2007 | Psych | Vernon Stallings | Episode: "From the Earth to Starbucks" |
| 2007 | Painkiller Jane | Dr. Lewis | Episode: "Breakdown" |
| 2007–2011 | Sanctuary | Henry Foss | Main role |
| 2008 | jPod | Alistair Parish | 4 episodes |
| 2008 | Reaper | Demon | Episode: "Cancun" |
| 2008–2009 | The Guard | Wendell Linham | Recurring role |
| 2009–2010 | Riese: Kingdom Falling | Rand | 6 episodes |
| 2010 | Caprica | Diego | 4 episodes |
| 2011 | The Listener | James Madison | Episode: "Desperate Hours" |
| 2011 | True Justice | David Bird | Episode: "Lethal Justice: Part 2" |
| 2012 | Hell on Wheels | Hawkins | 2 episodes |
| 2012 | The Philadelphia Experiment | Richard Falkner | Television film |
| 2012–2014 | Falling Skies | Tector | Recurring role |
| 2013 | Goodnight for Justice: Queen of Hearts | Pinkerton | Television film |
| 2013 | Arctic Air | Pool Hustler | Episode: "There's Gold in Them Thar Hills" |
| 2013 | The Killing | Joe Mills | Recurring role |
| 2013 | Republic of Doyle | Callum Pardy | Recurring role |
| 2013 | Delete | Max Hollis | 2 episodes |
| 2014 | Ascension | Duke Vanderhaus | Miniseries |
| 2014–2015 | Continuum | John Doe / Brad Tonkin | Main role |
| 2015 | Motive | Eric Sharpe | Episode: "Best Enemies" |
| 2015 | Proof | Ryder Newburn / Buddy | Episode: "Showdown" |
| 2015 | Once Upon a Time | Sir Hank Morgan | Episode: "Dreamcatcher" |
| 2015–2016 | Arrow | Conklin | Recurring role; 9 episodes |
| 2016 | The X-Files | Murphy | Episode: "Founder's Mutation" |
| 2016 | Real Detective | Detective John Cameron | Episode: "Misery" |
| 2016 | The Magicians | Knifemaker's Son | Episode: "Have You Brought Me Little Cakes" |
| 2016 | Not with His Wife | Aiden Savage | Television film |
| 2016–2017 | Van Helsing | Taka | 4 episodes |
| 2017 | Rogue | | Episode: "The Determined and the Desperate" |
| 2017 | The Lost Wife of Robert Durst | Jim | Television film |
| 2017 | Yellow | Poet | Television film |
| 2017–2018 | Ghost Wars | Edward Clark | 4 episodes |
| 2017–2019 | Pure | Noah Funk | Series lead |
| 2018 | The Good Doctor | Hunter | Episode: "Pain" |
| 2018 | The Black Widow Killer | Steven Dwyer | Television film |
| 2018–2019 | Deadly Class | Rory | 3 episodes |
| 2019 | The Twilight Zone | David Kendall | Episode: "The Comedian" |
| 2019–2023 | Riverdale | Frank Andrews | Recurring role; 39 episodes |
| 2020 | Snowpiercer | Jack | Episode: "Prepare to Brace" |
| 2020–2021 | The Astronauts | Griffin Combes | 10 episodes |
| 2021 | Hudson & Rex | Jon 'Sorcerer' Carling | Episode: "Dead Man's Bridge" |
| 2022 | Surface | Dr. Patterson | Episode: "Psychogenic" |
| 2023 | Joe Pickett | Robbie Jax | Episode: "Ducks and Falcons" |
| 2024 | Family Law | Magnus Sundstrom | Episode: "It's the End of the World as We Know It" |
| 2024 | Tracker | Seth Adler | Episode: "Missoula" |
| 2025 | Sight Unseen | Walter Farrow | Episode: "Chain Reaction" |
| 2025 | Watson | Lloyd the Pharmacist | Episode: "Teeth Marks" |
| 2026 | Little House on the Prairie | Russell Kind | 5 episodes |

=== Web ===
| Year | Title | Role | Notes |
|---|---|---|---|
| 2011 | Mortal Kombat: Legacy | Raiden | Episode: "Raiden" |

=== Music videos ===
| Year | Title | Artist(s) | Role | Ref. |
|---|---|---|---|---|
| 2003 | "The Laws Have Changed" | The New Pornographers | Actor | |

== Awards and nominations ==
| Year | Award | Category | Work | Result | Ref. |
|---|---|---|---|---|---|
| 2005 | Leo Award | Best Performance by a Male in a Short Drama | Man. Feel. Pain. | Won | |
| 2006 | Leo Award | Best Performance by a Male in a Short Drama | When Jesse Was Born | Nominated | |
| 2008 | Leo Award | Best Guest Performance by a Male in a Dramatic Series | jPod | Won | |
| 2008 | Leo Award | Best Supporting Performance by a Male in a Feature Length Drama | Taming Tammy | Nominated | |
| 2008 | Leo Award | Best Supporting Performance by a Male in a Dramatic Series | The Guard | Nominated | |
| 2009 | Leo Award | Best Supporting Performance by a Male in a Dramatic Series | The Guard | Nominated | |
| 2009 | Leo Award | Best Guest Performance by a Male in a Dramatic Series | Sanctuary | Won | |
| 2010 | Leo Award | Best Supporting Performance by a Male in a Dramatic Series | Sanctuary | Nominated | |
| 2010 | Leo Award | Best Performance by a Male in a Short Drama | Collide | Nominated | |
| 2011 | Leo Award | Best Supporting Performance by a Male in a Dramatic Series | Sanctuary | Won | |
| 2012 | Leo Award | Best Performance by a Male in a Short Drama | Suffer | Nominated | |
| 2012 | Leo Award | Best Lead Performance by a Male in a Feature Length Drama | Marilyn | Won | |
| 2012 | Leo Award | Best Lead Performance by a Male in a Feature Length Drama | Everything and Everyone | Nominated | |
| 2013 | Leo Award | Best Guest Performance by a Male in a Dramatic Series | Hell on Wheels | Nominated | |
