= The Confessor (film) =

- Directed by: Lewin Webb
- Written by: Brad Mirman
- Produced by: Gary Howsam
- Starring: Christian Slater; Molly Parker; Stephen Rea
- Cinematography: Curtis J. Petersen
- Edited by: Nick Rotundo
- Music by: Gary Koftinoff
- Production company: Peace Arch Entertainment Group
- Distributed by: Sony Pictures Home Entertainment
- Release dates: August 28, 2004 (Montréal World Film Festival); March 21, 2006 (Canada)
- Running time: 91 minutes
- Country: Canada
- Language: English

The Good Shepherd (also known as The Confessor in the United States) is a 2004 Canadian drama film directed by Lewin Webb, written by Brad Mirman, and starring Christian Slater, Molly Parker and Stephen Rea. The film follows a high-heeled Catholic priest's investigation of a troubled teen's mysterious death. It was released direct-to-video on March 21, 2006.

== Plot ==
This religious-themed thriller follows Daniel Clemens (Christian Slater), a priest serving as public-relations representative for the Catholic Church, who embarks on an investigation against the will of Church authorities to prove the innocence of a fellow clergyman accused of the murder of a young homosexual prostitute. When the accused is found having committed suicide in prison, with the help from a dedicated reporter (Molly Parker) who was Father Clemens's girl-friend before he became a priest, they begin uncovering disturbing facts.

== Cast ==
- Christian Slater as Daniel Clemens
- Molly Parker as Madeline Finney
- Stephen Rea as McCaran
- Gordon Pinsent as Cardinal Ledesma
- Nancy Beatty as Lucy Gallagher
- Von Flores as Father Andrews
- Daniel Kash as Jeffrey Altman
- Alex Paxton-Beesley as Monica
- Jordan Hughes as Cameron
- Roman Podhora as Detective Sherman
- Shawn Lawrence as Bishop Sorano
- Colin Glazer as Monsignor Hummel
- Joan Gregson as Mrs. Donelly
- Kyra Harper as Mrs. Andrews
- Duane Murray as James
- Tim Progosh as Phillip Patterson
- Gary Brennan as Grey Hair
- James Dallas Smith as Eric Halloran
- Vanessa MacDonald as Female Police Officer
- Renee Percy as Godmother

== Filming ==
Filming took place in Hamilton, Ontario in 2004.
