= Summer H. Howell =

Canadian actress (born 2004)

- Howell in 2026
- Born: May 22, 2004 (age 22); Manitoba, Canada
- Occupation: Actress
- Years active: 2013–present

Summer Helena Howell (born May 22, 2004) is a Canadian actress. Beginning her career as a child actress, she starred in the films The Midnight Man (2016), Hunter Hunter (2020), and Clouds (2020). Howell had her breakthrough role as the title character in Mike Flanagan's supernatural horror series Carrie (2026).

== Early life ==
Summer H. Howell was born near Winnipeg, Manitoba on May 22, 2004. She lives with her family in St. Andrews. Her older brother was also a child actor; he is now a civil engineer.

== Career ==
At the age of six, Howell accompanied her older brother to a Crest toothpaste commercial audition. Originally intending to audition with him, she withdrew from the opportunity, though she continued to help her brother with rehearsals. After auditioning to two other projects, she made her feature film debut in the horror sequel Curse of Chucky (2013).

In 2025, it was announced that Howell had been cast in the title role of Carrie White in the Amazon Prime Video supernatural horror series Carrie, based on the Stephen King novel and helmed by Mike Flanagan. While preparing to audition for the role, she intentionally did not study the original novel or 1976 film adaptation because she knew Flanagan's vision would differ from them. Howell was chosen for the role from over 1,400 actresses. Carrie premiered on October 7, 2026 to positive reviews, with Howell's performance receiving critical acclaim from numerous outlets.

== Filmography ==
=== Film ===
Year	Title	Role	Notes
2013	Curse of Chucky	Alice Pierce	
2014	Garm Wars: The Last Druid	Nascien 666	
2014	Heart Wired	Copper	Short film
2014	Advanced Wizards & Warriors	Rachel / Homunculus	Short film
2016	The Midnight Man	Young Anna "Annie" Luster	
2017	Cult of Chucky	Alice Pierce	
2020	Clouds	Grace Sobiech	
2020	Hunter Hunter	Renee Mersault	
2021	Harland Manor	Sarah Ann Garrett	
2023	All Fun and Games	Demon / Daniel Good	
2024	Spirit in the Blood	Emerson Grimm	
2024	Time Cut	Jessica	
2025	Normal	Young Woman	
2025	Night of the Reaper	Emily Golding	
TBA	Runaway	Connie	

=== Television ===
Year	Title	Role	Notes
2015	Sunnyside	Actor	Episode: "War is Hell"
2017	Channel Zero	Margot (Age 11)	3 episodes
2020	Crashing Through the Snow	Mia Randall	Television film
2023	The Spencer Sisters	Jasmine	Episode: "The Virtuoso's Vixation"
2023	Abducted by My Teacher: The Elizabeth Thomas Story	Elizabeth Thomas	Television film
2026–present	Carrie	Carietta "Carrie" White	Lead role; 8 episodes
