= Hunter Hunter (film) =

2020 horror film

- Film poster
- Directed by: Shawn Linden
- Screenplay by: Shawn Linden
- Produced by: Shawn Linden; Neil Elman; Juliette Hagopian
- Starring: Devon Sawa; Camille Sullivan; Summer H. Howell; Nick Stahl
- Cinematography: Greg Nicod
- Edited by: John Gurdebeke; Chad Tremblay
- Music by: Kevon Cronin
- Production companies: Particular Crowd; Caramel Films; MarVista Entertainment
- Distributed by: IFC Midnight
- Release date: December 18, 2020 (United States)
- Running time: 93 minutes
- Countries: Canada; United States
- Language: English
- Box office: $32,705

Hunter Hunter is a 2020 horror thriller film written and directed by Shawn Linden and stars Devon Sawa, Camille Sullivan, Summer H. Howell, and Nick Stahl.

The film was released on December 18, 2020 by IFC Midnight in select theaters, on DVD and on demand and it received mostly positive reviews from critics.

== Plot ==
Joseph Mersault (Sawa), his wife Anne (Sullivan) and his daughter Renee (Howell) live in the remote Canadian wilderness, making a meager living as fur trappers. Joseph trains the eager Renee how to bait and trap various animals, while Anne stays home and takes care of the cabin, washing clothes and fetching water.

Their tranquility is threatened when a dangerous wolf begins to eat trapped animals along their fur line. Despite Anne's protests, Joseph leaves the cabin in order to track the wolf and eliminate the threat.

After a long day in the wilderness tracking the wolf with Renee, Joseph finds fresh tracks and sends his daughter back home out of concern for her safety. However, Joseph continues to hunt the wolf alone. He eventually stumbles upon a group of dead young women - brutally slaughtered, bared naked and arranged in a ritualistic circle.

Joseph returns home, but does not tell his family what he saw, instead claiming that he saw a wolf but failed to shoot it. The next day, Joseph tells Anne that he is going to hunt the wolf; instead, he begins tracking the killer of the young women.

Anne begins to worry about Joseph when he does not return home after a day, and she reports the dangerous wolf to the local police officers Barthes (Gabriel Daniels) and Lucy (Lauren Cochrane). They are dismissive, however, claiming that the wolf is merely doing what nature intended, in the wild, where city laws do not apply. Furthermore, the land on which Joseph's cabin is situated is federal land, and reporting the wolf would therefore trigger a federal investigation. Worried about losing their home, Anne leaves the station.

Running low on food, Anne shoots a baby deer, much to Renee's distress. Renee teaches Anne how to properly skin an animal; she had never learned how because Joseph was always around to do it.

One night, Renee hears cries of pain from the woods. After searching for the source, Anne finds a wounded stranger, Lou (Stahl). She brings him back to the cabin, whereupon he reveals that he is a wildlife photographer who was attacked by a wolf while taking photographs. Anne begins to nurse Lou back to health.

Meanwhile, police officer Barthes believes something strange to be going on with Anne and Renee, so he vows to go find them. On the way, however, he stumbles upon the same corpses as Joseph has previously. While trying to call Lucy for backup, Barthes's leg and arm are ensnared by bear traps that had been set by Joseph.

Anne goes looking for some food to eat, leaving Lou and Renee alone in the cabin. After killing a rabbit, Anne stumbles upon Joseph's corpse, and realizes that Lou killed him. She rushes back to the cabin but is knocked unconscious by Lou.

After Anne wakes up, Lou attempts to strangle and rape her, while listening to music on an old walkman. However, Anne manages to grab an animal trap and closes it on Lou's face. As he screams in pain, Anne goes to check on Renee, and finds that Lou has already killed her.

Unable to scream for help after losing lots of blood, Officer Barthes nevertheless manages to alert Lucy and other emergency workers of his location by firing his pistol into the air. By the time they arrive, though, Barthes has already died. Lucy and other police officers begin to examine the bodies of the young women.

Anne, meanwhile, has strung Lou up by his hands and prepares to skin him alive. She listens to loud music on his walkman, drowning out his screams, as she flays his entire upper body, including his face.

The police officers are alerted to a fire that Lou started and they follow the smoke back to the cabin. Upon their arrival, Anne quietly exits the cabin, holding Lou's skinned face, which she tosses to the ground. She sits down on her front porch and turns off the walkman. The film goes silent as police officers surround Anne with their guns drawn.

== Cast ==
- Devon Sawa as Joseph Mersault
- Camille Sullivan as Anne Mersault
- Summer H. Howell as Renee Mersault
- Nick Stahl as Lou
- Gabriel Daniels as Barthes
- Lauren Cochrane as Lucy
- Jade Michael as Tina
- Erik Athavale as Greg
- Blake Taylor as Cully
- Karl Thordarson as Officer #1

== Reception ==
On Rotten Tomatoes, the film has an approval rating of 94%, based on 52 reviews, with an average rating of 6.8/10. The website's critics consensus reads: "Bloody and brutal, Hunter Hunter is a hard-hitting survivalist thriller that ratchets its tension with precision." On Metacritic, the film has a weighted average score of 61 out of 100, based on nine critics, indicating "generally favorable" reviews.
