= Dirty Singles =

- Film poster
- Directed by: Alex Pugsley
- Written by: Alex Pugsley
- Produced by: Melanie Windle
- Starring: Paul Campell; Alex Paxton-Beesley; Ennis Esmer; Lauren Ash; Jefferson Brown; Melissa Hood; Matthew Edison; Samantha Espie; Shannon Kook; Pat Thornton; Alyssa Capriotti; Brittany Adams
- Cinematography: Jason Tan
- Edited by: Adam Locke-Norton
- Music by: Joseph Murray; Lodewijk Vos
- Production companies: Global Mechanic; Shaftesbury Films
- Distributed by: Video Services Corporation; Shaftesbury
- Release date: March 1, 2014
- Running time: 80 minutes
- Country: Canada
- Language: English

Dirty Singles is a 2014 Canadian romantic-comedy feature film written and directed by Alex Pugsley. The film was released by Video Services Corporation in Canada in September 2014 and was released in the United States in March 2016.

== Plot ==
A group of thirty-something Toronto friends and so-called friends try to navigate the world of love, romance and relationships, often within the context of those friendships and so-called friendships. The so-called ones are often in only a case of needing to maintain some sense of harmony in light of other friendships or relationships within the group. Included within the group are a married couple, a long-term couple (fifteen years) perhaps on the verge of marriage, some exes, some singles looking for love without success, some singles who may have found love already that hasn't or haven't worked out, and some players who aren't looking for love but only their next sex partner. And more often than not, each person, regardless of what their life looks like from the outside, is looking for something else besides what they have.

== Cast ==
- Paul Campell as Jack
- Alex Paxton-Beesley as Megan
- Ennis Esmer as Sean
- Lauren Ash as Carol
- Jefferson Brown as Gordo
- Melissa Hood as Caprice
- Matthew Edison as Jim
- Samantha Espie as Shelley
- Shannon Kook as Ian
- Pat Thornton as Matt
- Alyssa Capriotti as Tara
- Brittany Adams as Chloe

== Production ==
The film was cast in October–November 2012 and shot in December 2012 over fourteen days and thirty-one locations in the Dundas-Ossington area.

== Release ==
The film premiered at the 2014 Calgary International Film Festival. The film has also screened at the 2014 Vancouver International Film Festival, the 2015 Kingston Canadian Film Festival, and the 2015 Newport Beach Film Festival.

== Critical reception ==
Dirty Singles has received generally positive reviews from critics.

Eric Volmers of the Calgary Herald writes, "Dirty Singles works because it is believable, written with an ear for natural dialogue, and performed seamlessly by the cast."

Steve Gow of the Metro News comments that "Dirty Singles is a well-balanced movie that’s reminiscent of such multi-layered rom-coms as Love Actually and Crazy Stupid Love.".

"The characters are real people," remarks Jude Klassen in Movie Entertainment Magazine, "sometimes gorgeous, and sometimes a little hung-over and defeated. The dialogue is deadly sharp without being overtly honed, a credit to both the writing and the acting."

And Bruce DeMara of the Toronto Star, in a three-out-of-four starred review, writes, "The dialogue crackles throughout with profanity, wisecracks and well-observed truisms as the players variously grapple with infidelity, STDs and achieving orgasm."

Reviewers consistently singled out the performances of Lauren Ash and Ennis Esmer, who were nominated for multiple awards for their performances as Carol and Sean, winning Best Female Performance in a Feature and Best Male Performance in a Feature respectively at the 2015 Canadian Comedy Awards.

== Prizes and awards ==
- Winner 2013 TIFF Irving Avrich Emerging Filmmaker Award (for Alex Pugsley and Melanie Windle)
- Nominated for Best Canadian Feature at 2014 Vancouver International Film Festival
- Nominated for Best Performance Actor Male (Ennis Esmer) at 2015 ACTRA Awards
- Nominated for Best Performance Actor Female (Lauren Ash) at 2015 ACTRA Awards
- Nominated for Achievement in Music (Original Song) at 2015 Canadian Screen Awards
- Winner Best Male Performance (Ennis Esmer) in a Feature at 2015 Canadian Comedy Awards
- Winner Best Female Performance (Lauren Ash) in a Feature at 2015 Canadian Comedy Awards
