= Man. Feel. Pain. =

2004 film

- Directed by: Dylan Akio Smith
- Written by: Kris Elgstrand
- Produced by: Wendy Russell; Nancy Welsh
- Starring: Brad Dryborough; Ryan Robbins; Peter New; Arabella Bushnell
- Cinematography: Dylan Akio Smith
- Edited by: Tony Dean Smith
- Music by: Allan Levy
- Production companies: Crazy8s; Love Your Work Productions
- Distributed by: Brit Shorts
- Release date: May 15, 2004 (Crazy8s)
- Running time: 11 minutes
- Country: Canada
- Language: English

Man. Feel. Pain. is a Canadian short drama film, directed by Dylan Akio Smith and released in 2004. The film stars Brad Dryborough as Karl, an isolated loner who deliberately nails his hand to a wall as an experiment in self-inflicted pain, only to become venerated by his neighbours as a Christ-like figure as they learn of his suffering. Smith described the film as "about people being drawn to false idols".

The film's cast also includes Ryan Robbins, Peter New and Arabella Bushnell.

The film was produced for and premiered at the 2004 Crazy8s festival in Vancouver. It was later screened at the 2004 Toronto International Film Festival, where it won the award for Best Canadian Short Film, and at the Whistler Film Festival, where it was cowinner with Becky Bristow's film A Russian Wave of the ShortWork Award.
