= Taking My Parents to Burning Man =

- Directed by: Joel Ashton McCarthy and Bryant H. Boesen
- Produced by: Joel Ashton McCarthy; Bryant H. Boesen
- Starring: Bryant H. Boesen
- Cinematography: Joel Ashton McCarthy
- Edited by: Joel Ashton McCarthy and Bryant H. Boesen
- Music by: Brett Statham
- Release date: April 5, 2014 (Sonoma International Film Festival)
- Running time: 82 minutes
- Country: Canada
- Language: English
- Budget: $10,000

Taking My Parents to Burning Man is a 2014 Canadian documentary film directed by Joel Ashton McCarthy and Bryant H. Boesen that follows the latter's adventures with his 60-year-old parents at Burning Man. It provides a behind-the-scenes look at the preparation, journey and adventures at the "least-likely family vacation imaginable."

== Production ==
Boesen wanted to make a documentary about Burning Man to help define it for people who have never been. According to Boesen, it was his parents' decision to attend Burning Man; as he was planning to shoot a documentary anyway and they were already attending, he asked if he could follow them on their first visit.

Boesen approached McCarthy while the two were finishing film school to make the documentary. In April 2012, after McCarthy maxed out two credit cards, the pair launched a crowdfunding campaign on Kickstarter. After successfully raising over $10,000, Kickstarter refused to deliver payment due to an "administrative glitch" and despite Boesen having proof of being a dual US/Canadian citizen. The incident is incorporated into the feature. In December 2012 they relaunched their campaign, this time using indiegogo and again reached their $10,000 goal.

Their journey took them on a road-trip from Vancouver, British Columbia to northern Nevada in a 35-foot school bus. About 40 hours of footage was shot, including on-location from August 27 to September 3, 2012, with the approval of Black Rock City, LLC.

== Reaction ==
Selling out seven consecutive screenings, it won the Audience Choice Award for Best Documentary at both the 2014 Sonoma International Film Festival, where it had its world premiere, and the 2014 Newport Beach Film Festival. It also won the Micro-Budget Feature Award at the 2014 Maui Film Festival. It held its Canadian premiere at the Rio Theatre in May 2014.

Peter Mehlman described it as, "Funny, oddly heart-warming and beautifully produced... portrays Burning Man honestly." Fellow Vancouver filmmakers the Soska sisters called it, "the real spirit of Burning Man." Chelsea Rush praised its depiction of the family bonding. Tommy Cook, although liking it, mentions it becomes, "an exercise in creativity-shunned, where the only answer to rampant corporate greed and the monotony of the '9 to 5' is to regress back to a constant state of adolescence."
