= Alex Paxton-Beesley =

Canadian actress

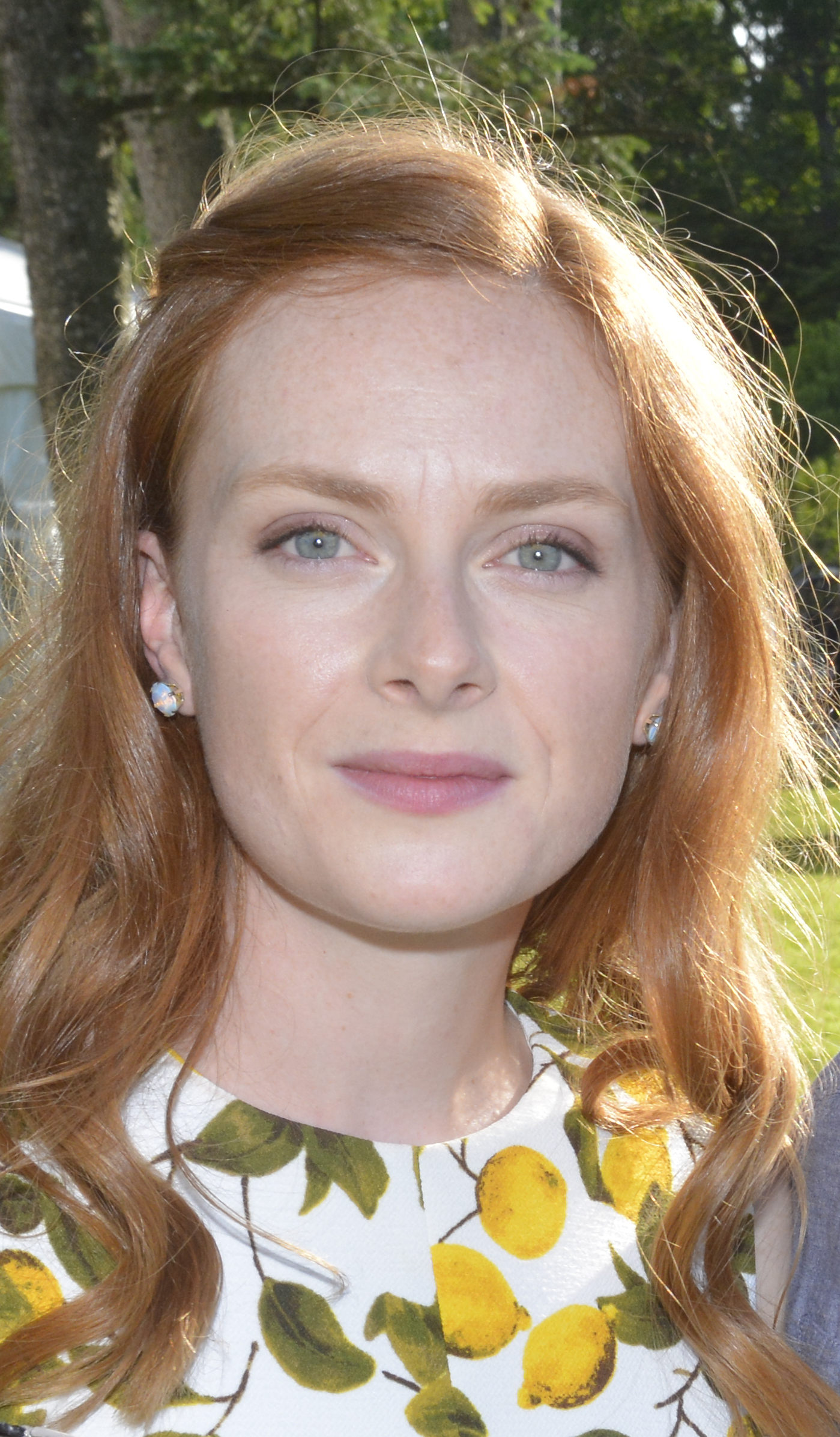
- Paxton-Beesley at the Canadian Film Centre Annual Garden Party in 2016
- Born: September 24, 1986 (age 40); Toronto, Ontario
- Occupation: Actress
- Years active: 2004–present

Alex Paxton-Beesley (born September 24, 1986) is a Canadian actress. She is noted for her acting roles in several TV series, including Copper, The Strain, Wynonna Earp, Cardinal and Pure.

== Early life ==
Paxton-Beesley was born and raised near the Grange Park neighbourhood of downtown Toronto close to the Art Gallery of Ontario (AGO) which is an art museum in Toronto, Ontario, Canada. Her first memory of acting on stage was in a playschool production as a rain cloud. When she was in the fourth grade, she moved to Italy for one year attending school there and learned to speak Italian. On her return to Canada, Paxton-Beesley attended the University of Toronto and was involved in a production of Buried Child with the Victoria College Dramatic Society.

== Education and theatre work ==
Paxton-Beesley graduated in 2008 from the George Brown Theatre School in Toronto, then went on to graduate from the Actors' Conservatory at the Canadian Film Centre.

== Theatre ==
Paxton-Beesley has been involved in stage work at The Company Theatre in Festen in 2008, at the Canadian Stage Company and the Citadel Theatre on Rock 'n' Roll in 2009, and at the Theatre Aquarius in The Woman in White. Paxton-Beesley was nominated and won an Outstanding Actress (Small) MyTheatre Award for her performance in Slip, for Circlesnake Productions, a complex psychological drama in which she played a detective, at the Harbourfront Centre: World Stage, Toronto. The production later moved to the Tarragon Theatre, her performance receiving high praise from Theatre Critic Karen Fricker.

== TV and film ==
Paxton-Beesley first appeared on screen in 2004 in The Good Shepherd (also known as The Confessor (film)), alongside Christian Slater and Molly Parker. Her television debut was in 2009, in Murdoch Mysteries and Being Erica. She was Young Rebecca in Warehouse 13, In 2012, she had a recurring role in The Firm as Sarah Holt for 9 episodes, the same year had a regular role in Copper, an American Civil War drama, wherein she played Ellen Corcoran for 11 episodes.

In 2014, she starred as Ann-Marie Barbour in series 3 of The Strain by Guillermo del Toro. The same year, she also starred in the film Dirty Singles, which featured at the 2014 Calgary International Film Festival.

In 2016, she played Hetty Tate in Wynonna Earp. In 2018, she played the role of "Red", a brain-damaged shooting victim, in six episodes of the TV series Cardinal, and in the same year starring as Anna Funk in Pure.

In 2021, Paxton-Beesley played a lead role as Katherine in the TV film A Mother's Lie alongside Sonja Smits who played her mother.

== Other work ==
Paxton-Beesley offers advice to budding acting students that they be mentally, physically and emotionally prepared for the reality of rejection in auditions. She was purported to suggest to students at a Niagara College Q&A session that of around 400 of her auditions (to 2014), only 10% or so were successful.

== Personal life ==
Her brother Tommy Paxton-Beesley is a musician, better known by the stage name River Tiber.

== Filmography ==
=== Film ===
Year	Title	Role
2004	The Good Shepherd	Monica
2012	Your Place or Mine (short)	Annie
2012	Malody	Malody
2013	The Colony	Terrified Woman
2014	Burnt Grass (short)	Sally
2014	Dirty Singles	Meagan
2015	Shavasana (short)	Claire
2015	Dredger (short)	Bird the Wifmaid
2017	Space & Time	Frances
2018	The Spadina House (short)	The Maid
2021	PAW Patrol: The Movie	additional voices
2021	The Desperate Hour	Off-Screen reader
2023	Close to You	Megan

=== Television film ===
Year	Title	Role / reference
2012	Christmas with Holly	Shelby (supporting lead)
2014	Guilty at 17	June Gailey
2017	The Perfect Soulmate	Sarah Miles
2020	Proposing Murder - A Crossword Mystery	Abby
2020	Is There a Killer in My Family?	Lauren
2021	A Mother's Lie	Katherine
2022	The Holiday Swap	Ally

=== Television series ===
Year	Title	Role
2009	Being Erica	Laurie (1 episode)
2010	Republic of Doyle	Theresa Harris (1 episode)
2010–2011	Warehouse 13	Rebecca St. Claire / Young Rebecca (2 episodes)
2011	Suits	Kelsey Price (1 episode)
2011	The Listener	Elizabeth Simmonds (1 episode)
2012	Flashpoint	Paramedic (1 episode)
2012	Alphas	Megan Bates (2 episodes)
2012	Beauty & the Beast	Chloe London (1 episode)
2012	Rookie Blue	Rachel Finley (1 episode)
2012	The Firm	Sarah Holt (9 episodes)
2012–2013	Copper	Ellen Corcoran (11 episodes)
2013	Lost Girl	Lola (1 episode)
2014	The Strain	Ann-Marie Barbour (3 episodes - series 3)
2015	Haven	Kira Fletcher (2 episodes)
2015	Minority Report	Liz Rutledge (1 episode)
2015	Remedy	Jennifer Wilson (1 episode)
2016	Private Eyes	Robyn Westing (1 episode)
2016	Wynonna Earp	Hetty Tate (1 episode)
2009–2017 & 2021	Murdoch Mysteries	Winifred Pink / Winifred 'Freddie' Pink / Lillie Dunn (7 episodes)
2018–2019	Pure	Anna Funk (12 episodes)
2018	Impulse	Sabine (3 episodes)
2018	Cardinal	Red (6 episodes)
2020	Fortunate Son	Pam Tiller (2 episodes)
2020–2021	The Bold Type	Eva Rhodes (recurring role - 6 episodes)
2021	Sex/Life	Judy (2 episodes)
2022	Astrid & Lilly Save the World	Newscaster (voice)(S1.E1)
2023	Chucky	Gretchen (2 episodes)
2025	Motorheads	Kelly (4 episodes)

== Awards and nominations ==
Year	Award	Category	Nominated work	Result	Ref.
2016	MyTheatre Awards	Outstanding Actress (Small)	Slip (Circlesnake Productions) at the Harbourfront Centre: World Stage, Toronto	Won	
