= Kung Fu Elliot =

- Film poster
- Directed by: Matthew Bauckman; Jaret Belliveau
- Produced by: David Eberts
- Cinematography: Matthew Bauckman; Jaret Belliveau
- Edited by: Matthew Bauckman; Jaret Belliveau
- Music by: Edmund Duff
- Distributed by: Netflix
- Release date: January 17, 2014 (Slamdance Film Festivall)
- Running time: 81 minutes
- Country: Canada
- Language: English

Kung Fu Elliot is a 2014 Canadian film co-directed by Matthew Bauckman and Jaret Belliveau, reportedly a documentary, concerning the attempt of Elliot "White Lighting" Scott to become "Canada's first action star".

== Synopsis ==
The film, billed as a documentary, follows the misadventures of Elliot "White Lighting" Scott, a man from Halifax, to make his third martial arts film, Bloodfight, between 2011 and 2013. Scott, an alleged Japanese-Canadian who has allegedly won numerous martial arts championships, has in partnership with his long-suffering girlfriend Linda Lum produced, directed and scripted two previous "micro-budget" martial arts films starring himself, They Killed My Cat (2009) and The Hero and the Stalker (2010). Despite the low budget of his films and his inability to act, Scott is convinced he will become a great film star. Scott at one point says: "I’m being a superhero for everyone who can’t be a superhero in the movies". Scott talks constantly about his legions of "fans" that he supposedly has in both Canada and China, but which are never seen in the film.

One reviewer, Anthony Harrison, wrote about Scott's film-making attempts: "However, Scott makes Ed Wood seem as capable a filmmaker as Orson Welles or Alfred Hitchcock. He doesn’t make B-movies; even calling Scott’s films Z-movies compliments them. There exists no letter beyond Z to accurately describe how bad Scott’s movies are. They’re shot on digital cameras and feature wooden actors delivering inane dialogue alongside horribly executed effects and fight scenes...No matter how bad the movies are, they’re driven by a nearly childlike sincerity. Scott has ambitious ideas, but he’s crippled by a lack of money — and talent." Over the course of the film, Scott's relationship with Lum disintegrates owing to his childish, immature character; his unwillingness to propose marriage to Lum, which she clearly wants; and his preference for spending his time using her money to make his martial arts films instead of getting a job. Finally Lum persuades Scott to take a job with a local traditional Chinese medicine clinic, where he studies acupuncture.

Scott, a man with an Asian fetish, especially for Asian women, goes to China, ostensibly to study acupuncture and shoot film footage for Bloodfight at the Shaolin Monastery. In China, Scott makes advances upon nearly every woman he meets, says he will soon be making a film with Jackie Chan, claims to have 900 fans on a Facebook group in Beijing (Facebook is not allowed in China), inspires amusement from a Shaolin monk over his inability to perform kung fu properly, and is unable to buy Lum the jade engagement ring she wants. Scott's acupuncture teacher, Dr. Diana Li, complains about his behavior in China: "You just trying to meeting all the girls". Scott explains his Asian fetish as due to his supposed Japanese descent, claiming to be one-sixth Japanese.

Towards the end of the film, Scott is revealed to be a pathological liar and a manipulative man whose life-story is shown to be a fraud. Scott abandons Bloodfight, instead making pornographic films starring himself and various prostitutes. In the last scene, Lum breaks up with Scott concerning a woman he brought to her house the previous night, and he then assaults the cameraman. The film's epilogue states that Scott has never won any martial arts championships and he has disappeared from Halifax.

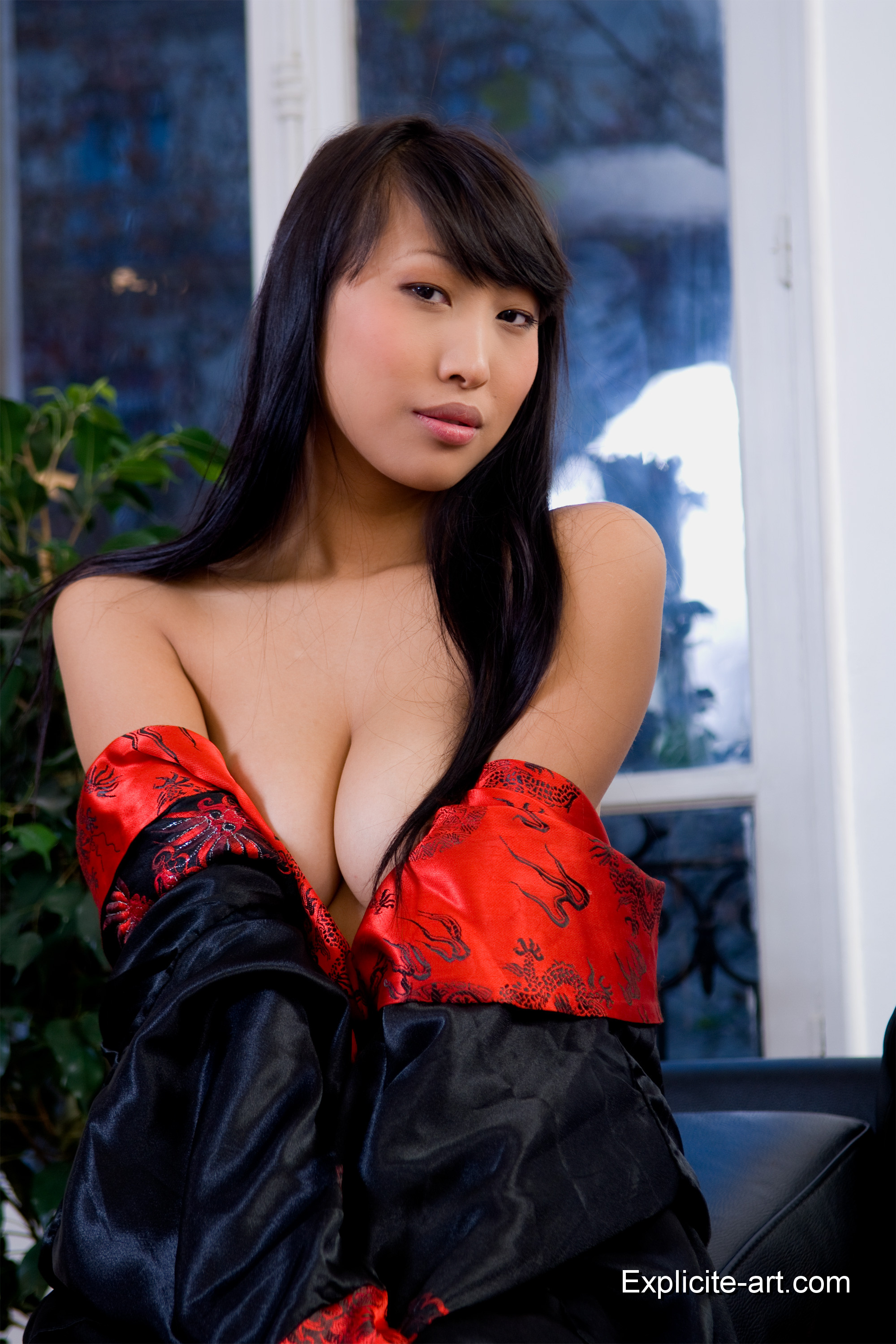
Sharon Lee as an example of the eroticized version of Asian women that appeals to the Asian fetishist Elliot

One of the filmmakers behind Kung Fu Elliot, Jaret Belliveau stated: "(Elliot’s) movie is a mind-boggling experience, and the fact that it exists, as a feature, just amazed us. It supposedly won these five awards at the Vancouver 8mm Martial Arts Film Festival, so we were perplexed by him right from the get-go. We confirmed on the Internet that the film fest where he won didn’t actually exist, but we thought it just added to the mystique of Elliot and the answers he gave to our questions. We thought it was all very innocent; he was still making Blood Fight, and he had this great cast of people around him and a supportive partner, and we didn’t know how far she was in on these little white lies." Belliveau stated that filming Scott was a frustrating experience as he was constantly lying to them about his supposed exploits and he stated his suspicion that the supposed stalker who was threatening Lum was in fact Scott, who was merely applying the plot of his film The Hero and the Stalker to real life in a bizarre bid to save a relationship that was falling apart.

== Interviews ==
- Elliot Scott
- Linda Lum
- Blake Zwicker
- Blair Bayers
- Dr. Diana Li

== Reviews ==
On review aggregator Rotten Tomatoes, the film holds an approval rating of 86% based on 14 reviews, with an average rating of 6.79/10. Reviewing the film in The New York Times, the critic Daniel Gold wrote: "Kung Fu Elliot chronicles his [Scott's] amateurish efforts to make a third feature, Bloodfight which he expects will be his breakthrough. Watching Elliot and his fellows stumble determinedly through shoots, pleasantly delusional about the movie’s prospects, is mildly amusing, a testament to indie film’s appeal for a certain hardy strain of dreamer...Upon his return home [from China], reality and fantasy increasingly collide, and Elliot’s distorted perspective slips into outright lies to friends and documentarians alike. By the abrupt and bizarre end of this odd little film, the question is whether Elliot’s just a low-grade scam artist or afflicted with a personality disorder. Or both". Reviewing the film in The Toronto Star, the critic Peter Howell wrote: "What begins as an amusing Project Grizzly-style account about a Canuck dreamer, one who jokes about making "acceptable cheese" with his movies, gradually becomes something different and darker as we learn one thing after another that mutes the laughter." However, Howell expressed some doubts about the last half of the film, wondering if Belliveau and Bauckman were manipulating Elliot on his self-destructive course. The critic Whitney Mallett wrote the film explored well the delusions of Scott from went from an eccentric underdog to a darkly manipulative type.

The critic Sarah Kurchak wrote that Elliot's manipulative behavior was repulsive and the film inspires schadenfreude at his ineptitude and sympathy for Lum. Kurchak also expressed some sympathy for the actor Blake Zwicker, writing his inept "unhinged" reading "To be or Not to be" soliloquy from Hamlet was "inhumane", but his pain over the death of his late girlfriend showed a more sympathetic side to the man." The critic Stephen Faber called the film the story of "likable, indefatigable losers"."

The critic Ben Sachs wrote in The Chicago Reader: "This Canadian documentary begins like an addition to the cycle, following Elliot Scott, a 30-ish amateur filmmaker, as he embarks on his latest no-budget actioner. Scott believes he can become the next Chuck Norris, and he's indulged by his idiot friends and long-suffering girlfriend (a levelheaded preschool teacher who should know better). As his production derails, however, the tone grows dark and revelations about Scott render him thoroughly unsympathetic. Directors Matthew Bauckman and Jaret Belliveau withhold key information until the third act, forcing one to reevaluate everything that came before, but by then you may already have grown tired of the cheap laughs." The critic Robert Horton wrote: "Kung Fu Elliot invites audience mirth at the expense of its collection of Nova Scotia oddballs, but you might not feel so guilty about your laughter by the time the movie reaches its bizarre, late-hatching revelations. There’s some creepy stuff going on in Halifax, folks...Elliot’s feeble martial-arts demonstration in front of an actual Shaolin monk is one of the movie’s indicators that Elliot’s bravado might not be founded in reality. In short, Elliot starts looking less like a self-deluded dreamer and more like a sociopath. Directors Matthew Bauckman and Jaret Belliveau play the audience quite skillfully here, as the story gradually goes down a disturbing road. It’s like watching the career of Ed Wood unfold in time-lapse quickness: from gung-ho promoter to ham-handed moviemaker to sleazy purveyor of soft-core (and possibly hard-core) porn. It’s a strange game for a documentary to play, and it leaves behind a faintly sour taste; you feel especially bad for the people sucked into Elliot’s high-kicking vortex. (One Blood Fight actor, hung out to dry by Elliot and the doc filmmakers alike, seems to have sprung from the Waiting for Guffman ensemble cast.) I’m mostly sure Kung Fu Elliot is for real; if not, somebody went to a lot of trouble to create the trailers for Elliot Scott’s past DVD efforts, such as They Killed My Cat".

In a review, the critic Chris Klimek wrote that Kung Fu Elliot was entertaining, but that: "Kung Fu Elliot’s violent climax arrives so swiftly, it raises the question of whether everything preceding it has been a hoax." In a review, the critic Casey Tourangeau questioned if the Kung Fu Elliot was really a documentary, stating the film felt "staged". Likewise, the critic Michael Rechtshafen wrote in The LA Times:"Well before that point arrives, when the affably goofy portrait takes a decidedly darker turn, one begins to suspect that directors Matthew Bauckman and Jaret Belliveau, just like their subject, might have been playing fast and loose with the truth. As presented, even the sweetly delusional Scott, with his heavy Canadian accent and doughy face, would have made for such a terrific SCTV character that it's hard to completely accept that he's the real deal". In a review, Kevin Jagernauth wrote about the efforts of Bauckman and Belliveau that the film was involving, but at the last act seemed implausible, leading him to suspect the film was staged.

The critic Etlan Adler wrote the film's: "...lively portrait of Elliot Scott, a Canadian martial-arts enthusiast with the dream of becoming his country’s first major action-movie star, always feels a little too good to be true. It’s not just the way that Scott’s delusions of grandeur make him resemble an extra from a Christopher Guest mockumentary; the entire production plays like a sly riff on the hit 1999 documentary American Movie, where director Chris Smith chronicled the low-budget filmmaking exploits of a modern-day Ed Wood, Mark Borchardt...And some cursory Googling brings up both an official Facebook page and Twitter feed for Scott—although the latter notably hasn’t been updated since 2012—as well as his production company’s website, Bad Acting Good Kung Fu Canada, which includes links to local press stories about him...But that doesn’t entirely erase lingering doubts that this whole thing might be an elaborate put-on, doubts that arise from the way the story unfolds and the behavior exhibited by both Scott and some of the supporting players in his life, including producer/girlfriend Linda Lum and buddy/co-star Blake Zwicker, who could be the Canadian cousin of American Movie sidekick Mike Schank...The fact that Kung Fu Elliot ultimately follows the same "fall from grace" arc that's present in so many fictional "star is born" narratives is another subtle indication that things aren’t necessarily what they appear to be. The movie ends with Scott conveniently fleeing Canada for parts unknown (possibly China) and neither he nor Lum appear to have stepped forward since to confirm or deny the movie's account of the final years of their professional and personal relationship."

The critic David Shreve argued that the film was not an "outright lie", but "there’s also no reason to believe that directors Matthew Bauckman and Jaret Belliveau didn’t have access to the big tone-shifting revelation until roughly the last week of Kung Fu Elliot in their two year filming stretch, which is what the film’s form and construction would have you believe. That information was knowingly back-pocketed until the right moment. Have whatever debate you would like regarding whether omission qualifies as deceit, but this sort of withholding certainly doesn’t constitute an act of honesty in the language of documentary film." About the debate over the veracity of the film, critic Rob Hunter wrote: "There are moments in the third act that might test the trust of viewers suspecting a staged interaction or line reading, but by all accounts what we see is real. It’s easy to question as Scott and his cohorts are at times too ridiculously bad at what they do, but their sincerity is on equal display."

== Awards ==
- Fantastic Fest Jury Award 2014-Best Documentary Feature.
- Slamdance Film Festival Grand Jury Prize 2014-Best Documentary Feature
