= Garm Wars: The Last Druid =

2014 science fiction film

- Movie poster
- Directed by: Mamoru Oshii
- Screenplay by: Mamoru Oshii; Geoffrey Gunn; Gen Urobuchi (Japanese dub)
- Story by: Mamoru Oshii
- Produced by: Makoto Asanuma; Mitsuhisa Ishikawa; Tetsu Fujimura; Lyse Lafontaine; Toshio Suzuki (Japanese dub)
- Starring: Lance Henriksen; Kevin Durand; Melanie St-Pierre; Jordan Van Dyck; Summer H. Howell; Andrew Gillies; Dawn Ford; Patrizio Sanzari; Martin Senechal
- Cinematography: Benoit Beaulieu
- Edited by: Atsuki Sato
- Music by: Kenji Kawai
- Production companies: Production I.G; Bandai Visual; Nakamura Group Advantage; Bandai Namco Entertainment; Lyla Films
- Distributed by: Toho (Japan); Arc Entertainment (U.S.)
- Release dates: October 25, 2014 (Tokyo); October 2, 2015 (Canada); May 20, 2016 (Japan)
- Running time: 102 minutes
- Countries: Canada; Japan
- Language: English

Garm Wars: The Last Druid is a 2014 English-language Japanese-Canadian live action/animated science fiction adventure film directed by Mamoru Oshii. It is also the first English-language film by Oshii, who is famous for his Japanese-language animated works including Ghost in the Shell and Urusei Yatsura. The film tells the story of three soldiers who abandon a genocidal war between tribes to seek answers about why their world has been abandoned by its god, and why the tribes were made to fight each other in the first place.

The film had two separate releases, with its English version premiering at the Tokyo Film Festival of 2014 and its Japanese version being released on May 20, 2016. The Japanese version was released as simply Garm Wars, and was produced by Studio Ghibli director Toshio Suzuki, with Gen Urobuchi writing the Japanese script. According to Suzuki, the Japanese dub "tried to change the impression of the film without changing the content of a single line."

== Plot ==
A small planet named Annwn circles around its blue parent planet called Gaia. Annwn was once populated by eight tribes, known as Garms. Long ago, the planet was at peace, as all the different races of Annwn were united by their collective servitude to their creator, a Goddess named Danaan. Violence broke out when Danaan left, setting all the tribes against each other in a never-ending war for supremacy. The war proved devastating to the planet's atmosphere, resulting in near annihilations of most of the tribes on the planet, though three remained—the Briga, the Kumtak and the Columba. During this time, the Druids, who previously conveyed the words of Annwn's Gods, disappeared. The Briga tribe lives on the ground and dominates in military superiority through the use of hybrid-powered tanks and cybernetics weaponry, while the weaker Kumtak tribe, facing near-extinction, is forced to submit to the Briga by offering advance information technology in their war against the Columba. The Columba rule the sky through the use of mechanized air forces and live in a fortified airship-like carrier.

The film is divided into three different acts. In Act 1, The Exile of the Three Magi, a Kumtak man named Wydd (Lance Henriksen) is captured by the Columba, along with a dog resembling a Basset Hound who he refers to as a 'Gula' (a holy creature to all the tribes) and a mysterious being who is identified as Nascien (Summer Howell), the last of the missing Druids. During his interrogation aboard the Columba airship, Wydd claims that he fled from the Briga people because the Kumtak are enslaved, and offers his services and the Druids' power to fight against his people's oppressors. When the airship is eventually destroyed during a Briga attack, Wydd reveals his true purpose, which is to travel to the lands of the Druids with Nascien and find out why Danaan created the Garms, if she intended to leave. He then recruits Khara (Melanie St-Pierre), the Columba clone-soldier that interrogated him, and Skelling (Kevin Durand), the Briga officer who led the attack on the airship, before setting off on this quest.

In Act 2, Passage to the Other World, Wydd and his companions continue their journey to the land of the Druids. As the journey draws on, Skellig and Khara both learn that they are quickly running out of mana, the life-energy that sustains them. Despite this pressing concern, the party travels in a Briga tank across war-torn wastelands and seas. Upon witnessing the devastation and brutality of the war, Khara begins to question the worth of the war, but Skellig does not appear to share these concerns.

In the final act, Sacred Grove, the party finally arrives at the land of the Druids. Unfortunately, the Briga tank breaks down, forcing Skellig to stay behind and repair it as Wydd, Khara and Nascien continue onward. During their exploration of the sacred grove, Wydd accidentally activates the Druids' defence systems and awakens giant robotic defenders. Skellig manages to repair the tank and hold off the defenders while the others escape, but loses his life in the process. When the group finally arrives at the source of the Druids' knowledge and power, Nascien kills Wydd and reveals her true purpose: to take control of the Druids' guardians and destroy all the Garms. While the guardians are awoken and set against the Garms, Khara manages to destroy Nascien before she escapes. Khara then asks the dying Nascien why the Garms were abandoned by the Gods. Nascien reveals that the Goddess Danaan left because she feared the destructive potential of the Garms, which is why Nascien took it upon herself to destroy them. Nascien then says the God's true name to satisfy Khara's curiosity, claiming that "They" are a jealous God. Khara then shoots Nascien and falls into a state of sorrow. As she looks up to the dispersed clouds, Gaia is revealed to resemble Earth, indicating that Annwn was once the Moon, and these "Gods" and the Goddess Danaan were responsible for the creation of mankind. The film then ends on a cliffhanger, with the rising gigantic robotic army called Malakh and the Garm warring tribes finally abandoning their endless war to unite against the common enemy, thus beginning a new age of heavy warfare on the planet of Annwn.

== Cast ==
Cast is displayed in order of appearance:

- Lance Henriksen as Wydd 256
- Kevin Durand as Skellig 58
- Melanie St-Pierre as Khara 22 and Khara 23
- Jordan Van Dyck as Interrogator A
- Summer H. Howell as Nascien 666
- Andrew Gillies as Columba Interrogator B
- Dawn Ford as Columba Commander
- Patrizio Sanzari as Kiakra Operator
- Martin Senechal as Technician

== Production ==
According to director Mamoru Oshii, production of Garm Wars began as early as the mid-1990s under the name G.R.M. The Record of Garm War, with planning for the film beginning shortly after the release of Ghost in the Shell. A combination of the 1996 and 1998 tech reels was screened at film festivals in 2001. However, production of the film—which originally had a planned budget of 6 billion yen—was put on hold for fifteen years due to technical limitations. Oshii announced that he had resumed production of the film in 2012, thanks to an animation technique Oshii calls "Hybrid Animation," which combines elements of computer-generated imagery and live-action filming. When asked why he decided to resume the film's creation fifteen years after its first conception, Oshii replied: "Unfortunately, at that time, the digital environment needed to realize the visuals was too undeveloped, and I was unable to create and release this film to the world. However, now in 2012, the environment for producing films has transformed, especially in digital technology which is currently operating at a shocking level compared to the time I first conceived this project. At long last, Garm Wars' time has come."

The film premiered at the Tokyo International Film Festival of October 2014, as part of the festival's Special Screening Section. Oshii also featured the film at Lucca Comics & Games of 2015, where he received the Movie Comic and Games award. Arc Productions earned the rights to the film in August 2015, releasing it in U.S. theaters and on demand on October 2, 2015.

On January 28, 2016, Toei Animation announced that it would be creating a Japanese dub of the film, under the title Garm Wars. The Japanese release had an all-star production team with Studio Ghibli director Toshio Suzuki as producer, with Gen Urobuchi, creator of Puella Magi Madoka Magica, Psycho Pass and the Fate/Zero anime writing the Japanese script. The dub was released on May 20, 2016.

== Reception ==
Reviews of Garm Wars: The Last Druid generally praise the film's visuals, music and sound design, while criticizing its overly complex plotline. On The Hollywood Reporter, Deborah Young praises the film's technical elements, praising its "spectacular visuals set to Kenji Kawai's heavenly choirs," but also criticizes its plot, stating that it is "...like an excerpt from a much longer and more complex epic with a lot of story missing." On Twitch Film, Christopher O'Keeffe said that "while [...] there is undoubtedly an impressive visual flair that's quite stunning at times" the film "from start to finish [...] feels like a prequel, a tie-in to flesh out a TV or game series," and that it is "like watching an overly long video game cut-scene I wanted to bash the X button and skip to the end". On Variety.com, Peter Debruge called the film "a visually stunning yet impenetrable hybrid blend of live action and CG visuals," but ultimately labels it as "guaranteed to bore all but "Ghost in the Shell" director Mamoru Oshii's most dedicated fans," due to its overly complex plotline. Screen International's Mark Adams described the film as "lush but ludicrous, beautiful but bewildering, inventive but inaccessible."
