= Jessica Clement =

Canadian actress

Jessica Clement is a Canadian actor. She is best known for her roles in the films Dream Scenario (2023), Longing, Everything's Going to Be Great (2023), and as the lead, Carly, in Night Blooms (2021).

Notable television credits include Pure (2017-2019) as Tina Funk, V.C. Andrews' Heaven TV mini-series (2019) as the titular character's sister, Fanny, and most recently in Gen V (2023–2025) as Harper.

== Early life ==
Clement was born and raised in Burlington, Ontario, Canada (outside Toronto). She started training for her acting career at the age of 7 in the Theatre Aquarius summer intensive, when she played young Cosette in their production of Les Misérables.

After graduating from Aldershot School, she first attended York University, and left when her studies were interrupted by filming obligations. She later attended the University of Guelph, and again chose to leave school when career opportunities arose.

== Career ==
=== Film ===
Clement played the role of Deena, the teenage babysitter, in the movie Night of the Reaper in 2025.

=== Television ===
Clement played the role of Tina, teenage daughter of protagonist parents Noah and Anna, on the Canadian crime drama "Pure" around 2019. She plays Mandy in the Reacher spin off, Neagley.

=== HamOnt Acting Studio ===
During the COVID-19 pandemic, Clement began collaborating with Nathan Fleet, director of the Hamilton Film Festival and the associated Hamilton School of Media Arts. Fleet provided the umbrella for Clement for create HamOnt Acting Studio where she provides a variety of classes and private coaching to help actors not only hone their performance skills, but also to acquire necessary knowledge about the industry, such as set etiquette, self-tape auditions, and getting an agent. She also co-writes/co-directs/co-produces/co-edits short films that screen at the Hamilton Film Festival, showcasing talent from HamOnt Acting Studio.
