= Arabella Bushnell =

Canadian actress and costume designer

Arabella Bushnell is a Canadian actress and costume designer. She is most noted for the 2014 film Songs She Wrote About People She Knows, in which she both played the lead role and designed the costumes; she received a Canadian Screen Award nomination for Best Costume Design at the 4th Canadian Screen Awards in 2016.

She also appeared in the films Man. Feel. Pain., The Cabin Movie, Doppelgänger Paul and Naked Bike Ride, and the television series Supernatural and Riverdale. As well, she has acted and designed sets and costumes for the stage, including productions of The Front Page, and Boston Marriage.

She is married to filmmaker Kris Elgstrand.
