= Alex Pugsley =

Canadian writer and filmmaker

Alex Pugsley (born 1963) is a Canadian writer and filmmaker, most noted for directing the 2014 film Dirty Singles.

In 1994 Pugsley and Laura MacDonald wrote and published Kay Darling, an epistolary novel consisting of letters between the title character and her friend Will.

As a filmmaker, he directed the short films The Pargonopers (1997), James O'Reilly in Parkdale (1997), and Fidelio (1998). He has since worked principally in television, writing for the television series My Best Friend Is an Alien, Liocracy, The Eleventh Hour, The Gavin Crawford Show, The Jane Show, Baxter, 15/Love, Life with Derek and Hudson & Rex.

His solo debut novel, Aubrey McKee, was published in 2020. He followed up with the short story collection Shimmer in 2022.

== Awards ==
He received a Gemini Award nomination for Best Writing in a Children's or Youth Program or Series at the 16th Gemini Awards in 2001 for the My Best Friend Is an Alien episode "I Am Larrabe Hicks!", and a nomination alongside Sean Reycraft for Best Writing in a Drama Series at the 18th Gemini Awards in 2003 for the Eleventh Hour episode "Shelter".

Along with Gavin Crawford, Kyle Tingley, Jennifer Whalen and Cathy Gordon, he is a two-time Canadian Comedy Award nominee for his work on The Gavin Crawford Show.

He won the Journey Prize in 2012 for his short story "Crisis on Earth-X".
