= Kris Elgstrand =

Canadian film director and screenwriter

Kris Elgstrand is a Canadian film director and screenwriter. He is most noted for his 2014 film Songs She Wrote About People She Knows, which received several Canadian Screen Award nominations at the 4th Canadian Screen Awards in 2016; Elgstrand himself was a nominee in the Best Original Song category for the film's song "Asshole Dave".

A frequent collaborator with Dylan Akio Smith and Brad Dryborough in the Whatever Institute filmmaking collective, he was the screenwriter of Smith's films Imetacanine, Man. Feel. Pain., Galo de Barcelos: The Chicken of Portugal, The Cabin Movie and Big Head, the screenwriter and co-director with Smith of Doppelgänger Paul, and the writer of Dryborough's short film Clean Dirt. On his own, he directed the short films Love Seat and In Her Ear before making Songs She Wrote About People She Knows as his solo feature debut. In 2020, he wrote the screenplay for David Milchard's comedy film An Awkward Balance.

Elgstrand has also written a number of stage plays, including Black Codes, Murder Ballads, The Boys, Steve's New Day and Songs of the Sad Sack, and has been active as a musician and songwriter.

He is married to actress and designer Arabella Bushnell.
