= Dylan Akio Smith =

Canadian film director and producer

Dylan Akio Smith (born September 21, 1974, in Vancouver, British Columbia) is a Canadian film director and producer. He is most noted for his 2004 short film Man. Feel. Pain., which won the award for Best Canadian Short Film at the 2004 Toronto International Film Festival.

His early short film Imetacanine won the award for best film at the ReelFast 48-Hour Film Festival in 2003.

He also directed the feature film The Cabin Movie (2005), and was co-director with Kris Elgstrand of Doppelgänger Paul (2011). He has been a frequent collaborator with Elgstrand and Brad Dryborough in the Whatever Institute filmmaking collective.

More recently he has worked as a cinematic director for Electronic Arts, most notably on several installments of the FIFA video game series.
