= Songs She Wrote About People She Knows =

- Film poster
- Directed by: Kris Elgstrand
- Written by: Kris Elgstrand
- Produced by: Amy Belling; Kris Elgstrand; Thea Grivakes
- Starring: Arabella Bushnell; Brad Dryborough; Ross Smith
- Cinematography: Amy Belling
- Edited by: Alex Leigh Barker
- Music by: Chris Gestrin
- Production companies: A Blue Car Films; Champagne Roll Productions; Legstand
- Distributed by: MarVista Entertainment
- Release date: 8 September 2014 (TIFF)
- Running time: 80 minutes
- Country: Canada
- Language: English

Songs She Wrote About People She Knows is a Canadian musical comedy film, released in 2014. The solo directorial debut of Kris Elgstrand, the film stars Arabella Bushnell as Carol, a shy, repressed office worker who begins expressing her frustrations with her friends and coworkers in song after being encouraged by a music therapist to open up about her feelings.

Her song "Asshole Dave" leads her boss Dave (Brad Dryborough) to fire her, but also reignites his own faded dream of becoming a rock star, setting them both off on a journey of creative discovery in which they may need each other's help more than they expected. Bushnell described the film as a story about people finding themselves and connecting with each other without using sex to do it.

The film had its premiere screening on September 8, 2014, at the 2014 Toronto International Film Festival.

The film received three Canadian Screen Award nominations at the 4th Canadian Screen Awards in 2016, in the categories of Best Costume Design (Bushnell), Best Original Score (Chris Gestrin) and Best Original Song (Elgstrand for "Asshole Dave").
