= Camille Mitchell =

Canadian actress

- Born: Camille Mitchell; Santa Monica, California, United States, North America
- Occupation: Actor

Camille Mitchell is an American-Canadian actress, writer, and director.

== Biography ==
Camille Mitchell was born in Santa Monica, California. She is the daughter of Cameron Mitchell. She was raised in Canada.

Mitchell trained at the University of British Columbia, Vancouver and at The Royal Central School of Speech and Drama, London. She studied documentary filmmaking at Capilano University and pursued her MFA at Loyola Marymount University's School of TV and Film.

Mitchell's work onstage, including leading roles at the Shaw and Stratford Festivals, has been critically acclaimed, and she won one of Canada's Jessie Awards for her performance as Ariel in The Tempest.

In 2018, Mitchell received a Leo Award nomination for her recurring role on ABC's "Somewhere Between".

In 2019, Mitchell received a Leo for Best Guest Performance by a Female in a Dramatic Series for her performance in "Van Helsing: I Awake".

In 2021, Mitchell received a 2021 Leo Award nomination for Best Performance by a Guest Star in "Ships In The Night".

In 2025, Mitchell was a Leo Award Nominee for Best Performance in "My David". She is perhaps best known on television for her role as Sheriff Nancy Adams on Smallville, for which she was nominated for a Leo Award for Best Supporting Performance by a Female in a Dramatic Series.

As a writer/director, two of her short films, A Mother's Love and By The Fountain, have earned several international accolades, including the Best Drama Award at the London Short Film Festival.

== Partial filmography ==
Year	Title	Special Notes	Character
1988	Space Mutiny		Jennera's voice
1991	Omen IV: The Awakening	TV movie	Madge Milligan
1996	Poltergeist: The Legacy	TV series	Sister Ingrid Rayne
2001	Suddenly Naked		Sasha
2003-2008	Smallville	TV series, 23 episodes	Sheriff Nancy Adams
2006	A Decent Proposal	Film	Anna Varvinsky
2007	The L Word	TV series, 2 episodes	Becca Voynovich
2008	Another Cinderella Story	Direct-to-video movie	Regina Cretikos
2010	Caprica	TV series, episode: "There Is Another Sky"	Vesta
2010	Life Unexpected	TV series, episode: "Love Unexpected"	Evelyn Thomas
2017	Marry Me at Christmas	Hallmark Channel movie	Barb
2015	A Novel Romance	Hallmark Channel movie	Jackie Billings
2020	Arrow	TV series, episode: "Green Arrow & The Canaries"	Maria Bertinelli

== Bibliography ==
- "Camille Mitchell profile". NorthernStars.ca. Archived from the original on 2007-03-04.
