= Joel Ashton McCarthy =

Canadian film director

Joel Ashton McCarthy is a Canadian film director.

== Career ==
McCarthy's debut feature, the documentary Taking My Parents to Burning Man (2014), successfully crowdfunded $10,000 and won multiple awards. In 2016, McCarthy won a Leo Award for directing the Crazy8s short film I Love You So Much It's Killing Them. In 2017, he was nominated for a Gotham Award for his series, Inconceivable, which won $50,000 from Telus Storyhive.

McCarthy later founded and ran the Vancouver 48-hour Run N Gun film competition.

== Selected filmography ==
=== As director ===
- Taking My Parents to Burning Man (2014)
- Shooting the Musical (2014)
- I Love You So Much It's Killing Them (2016, for Crazy8s)
- Inconceivable (2016-2017)
- I Am Alfred Hitchcock (2021)
