= Love the One You Love =

2014 South African comedy drama mystery film

- Directed by: Jenna Cato Bass
- Written by: Jenna Cato Bass
- Story by: Jenna Cato Bass
- Produced by: Jenna Cato Bass; Steven Markovitz; Lawrence Mattis
- Starring: Chi Mhende; Andile Nebulane; Louw Venter; Dayaan Salie; Mzu Ntantiso; Lise Slabber
- Cinematography: Jenna Cato Bass
- Edited by: Jenna Cato Bass; Jacques de Villiers
- Production company: Fox Fire Films
- Release date: July 2014 (Durban)
- Running time: 95 minutes
- Country: South Africa
- Languages: Xhosa; English

Love the One You Love is a 2014 South African romantic comedy-drama film directed by Jenna Cato Bass and co-produced by director himself with Steven Markovitz and Lawrence Mattis. The film stars Chi Mhende and Andile Nebulane with Louw Venter, Dayaan Salie, Mzu Ntantiso, and Lise Slabber in supporting roles. The film revolves around the secretive romantic relationship between Terri, a sex-line operator, and Sandile, a dog handler.

== Synopsis ==
Set in Cape Town, Love The One You Love follows the stories of sex-line operator Terri (Chiedza Mhende), dog handler Sandile (Andile Nebulane), and computer technician Eugene (Louw Venter), as they start to wonder whether their relationships are being manipulated within a larger conspiracy.

== Reception ==
The film made its premiered at the 2014 Durban International Film Festival. In 2014, the film was selected to screen at the Durban International Film Festival, for Official Competition, Busan International Film Festival, Flash Forward Competition, South Korea and Festival des 3 Continents, France. In 2015, the film was screened at the Göteborg International Film Festival, Sweden. The film received mixed reviews from critics.

=== Awards and nominations ===
In 2014 at the Durban International Film Festival, the film won the three most prestigious awards: Best South African Feature Film, Best Direction in a South African Feature Film and Best Actress. In the same year at the 3 Continents Festival, the film won the Youth Jury Award. In 2015, the film won the award for the Best Feature Film at the Jozi Film Festival. Apart from that, the film also had five other notable nominations: for the Best Upcoming Director, and Best Young Actor at the Africa Movie Academy Award, for the Flash Forward Award at the Busan International Film Festival, 2014, for the Ingmar Bergman Debut Award at the Göteborg International Film Festival, 2015 as well as for the Best New Actor and Best Debut Feature at the African Movie Academy Awards 2015.

== Cast ==
- Chiedza Mhende as Terri
- Andile Nebulane as Sandile
- Louw Venter as Eugene
- Dayaan Salie as Mo
- Mzu Ntantiso as Tsepho
- Lise Slabber as Laura
- Thenji Stemela as Nolly
- Nelson Das Neves as Nelson
- Brett Williams as Richard
- Francis Chouler as Chris
