= Steven Markovitz =

South African film and television producer

- Citizenship: South African
- Education: 1992 - Present
- Occupations: TV Producer; film producer
- Known for: aKasha, Silas, High Fantasy, Behind the Rainbow

Steven Markovitz (born in 1965) is a South African film and television producer. He has produced, co-produced and executive-produced features, documentaries and short films. He is a member of AMPAS, co-founder of Electric South & Encounters Documentary Festival and the founder of the African Screen Network.

Markovitz's productions include aKasha by Hajooj Kuka (Venice Critics’ Week, TIFF, 2018), Rafiki by Wanuri Kahiu (Cannes – Un Certain Regard, 2018), the documentary Silas by Anjali Nayar, Hawa Essuman (TIFF, IDFA 2017), Beats of the Antonov by hajooj kuka (TIFF Documentary Audience Award, 2014), High Fantasy by Jenna Bass (TIFF, Berlinale 2018), Viva Riva! By Djo Munga (TIFF 2010, Berlinale 2011) and Behind the Rainbow.

== Career ==
Markovitz began his career in 1992 and co-founded the production company Big World Cinema in Cape Town in 1994. In 1999, he produced the short film Husk, which premiered in competition at the Cannes Film Festival; followed by the award-winning It's My Life (2001), a portrait of South African AIDS activist Zackie Achmat. In 2003, The Tap, a short documentary which shows the change brought to a South African rural community when water is brought to it for the first time, won Best South African Documentary at the Apollo Film Festival and Best Production of the Year at the Stone Awards, South Africa.

Markovitz co-produced the Academy Award-nominated short film Inja ("Dog") in 2003; followed by the award-winning South African-Canadian feature film Proteus directed by John Greyson and Jack Lewis which premiered at Toronto International Film Festival in 2003 and Berlin; Raya, a short film part of the "Mama Afrika" series, which was theatrically released in the US in 2003; and the TV movie Crossing the Line by award-winning director Brian Tilley.

In 2005 he was the executive producer of the feature film Boy called Twist directed by Tim Greene, which screened at the Cannes Film Festival in 2005. This was followed by the animated short film Beyond Freedom, which screened at the Berlin International Film Festival.

Markovitz produced a series of thirteen films made by new South African documentary filmmakers titled Project 10: Real Stories from a Free South Africa. The series screened at Sundance, IDFA, Tribeca and Berlin. In 2008, he produced the acclaimed feature documentary Behind the Rainbow on South Africa's ruling party, directed by Jihan El-Tahri for ZDF/Arte, SBS, SVT, VPRO, SABC and ITVS (USA). Latitude, a series of 9 short films from 8 African countries, was executive-produced by Markovitz, and premiered at Berlin in February 2010. It included the award-winning Kenyan science fiction short Pumzi by Wanuri Kahiu.

In 2009 Markovitz completed the documentary omnibus Congo in Four Acts which travelled to over 50 festivals including Berlin, IDFA, Hot Docs 2010; and the documentary State of Mind, directed by Djo Tunda Wa Munga, investigating trauma and healing in the Democratic Republic of the Congo.

Markovitz co-produced the Congolese-French-Belgium crime thriller Viva Riva!, directed by Djo Tunda Wa Munga, which premiered at the Toronto International Film Festival in September 2010 and Berlin International Film Festival 2011 and won the MTV Movie Award for Best African Movie. It was released in USA, UK, Australia/NZ, Canada, Belgium, France, Germany and 18 African countries.

In 2013, Markovitz executive-produced the fiction omnibus African Metropolis consisting of six films by six directors across Africa. The films have screened at Durban IFF, Toronto IFF, Santa Barbara IFF and IFF Rotterdam.

In 2014, Markovitz was involved in three award-winning films: Stories of Our Lives, a Kenyan feature film about the LGBT community in Kenya, by Jim Chuchu and the NEST Collective, which Markovitz executive-produced. The film premiered at the Toronto International Film Festival and won the Berlin International Film Festival’s Teddy Jury Award; Love the One You Love, a South African feature film written, produced and directed by Jenna Cato Bass, which Markovitz produced. The film won prizes at the Durban International Film Festival, Jozi Film Festival and Three Continents Festival in Nantes; Documentary Beats of the Antonov was produced by Markovitz, and directed by Sudanese filmmaker Hajooj Kuka. The film premiered at the Toronto International Film Festival and won the People's Choice Documentary Award

== Other work ==
Markovitz is the co-founder of Encounters Festival South Africa, and the Close Encounters Documentary Laboratory. He is a founding member of the Independent Producers Organisation and has sat on various international film juries and selection panels, including Cinemart, Rotterdam, IDFA Bertha Fund and Silverdocs. In 2011, he moderated Good Pitch² in Johannesburg in partnership with BRITDOC, the first time that Good Pitch was hosted in Africa.
