= 2014 Toronto International Film Festival =

Annual Canadian film festival

- Festival poster
- Opening film: The Judge
- Closing film: A Little Chaos
- Location: Toronto, Ontario, Canada
- Founded: 1976
- Awards: The Imitation Game (People's Choice Award)
- Hosted by: Toronto International Film Festival Group
- No. of films: 393 films
- Festival date: 4–14 September 2014
- Website: tiff.net
- 2015 2013

The 39th annual Toronto International Film Festival, the 39th event in the Toronto International Film Festival series, was held in Canada from 4–14 September 2014. David Dobkin's film The Judge, starring Robert Downey Jr. and Robert Duvall was the opening night film. A Little Chaos, a British period drama directed by Alan Rickman and starring Kate Winslet closed the festival. More films for each section were announced on 12 August, with the line-up completed on 19 August. A total of 393 films were shown, including 143 world premieres. The first Friday was dubbed "Bill Murray Day", as festival organisers dedicated a day to the actor by screening a select number of his films for free.

== Awards ==
Award	Film	Director
People's Choice Award	The Imitation Game	Morten Tyldum
People's Choice Award First Runner Up	Learning to Drive	Isabel Coixet
People's Choice Award Second Runner Up	St. Vincent	Theodore Melfi
People's Choice Award: Documentaries	Beats of the Antonov	Hajooj Kuka
People's Choice Award, Documentary First Runner Up	Do I Sound Gay?	David Thorpe
People's Choice Award, Documentary Second Runner Up	Seymour: An Introduction	Ethan Hawke
People's Choice Award: Midnight Madness	What We Do in the Shadows	Taika Waititi and Jemaine Clement
People's Choice Award, Midnight Madness First Runner Up	Tusk	Kevin Smith
People's Choice Award, Midnight Madness Second Runner Up	Big Game	Jalmari Helander
Best Canadian Feature Film	Felix and Meira	Maxime Giroux
Best Canadian Short Film	The Weatherman and the Shadowboxer	Randall Okita
Best Canadian First Feature Film	Bang Bang Baby	Jeffrey St. Jules
FIPRESCI Discovery Prize	May Allah Bless France!	Abd al Malik
FIPRESCI Special Presentations	Time Out of Mind	Oren Moverman
Best International Short Film	A Single Body	Sotiris Dounoukos
Netpac Award for World or International Asian Film Premiere	Margarita, with a Straw	Shonali Bose

== Programme ==
=== Gala Presentations ===
- Black and White by Mike Binder
- Boychoir by François Girard
- The Connection by Cedric Jimenez
- The Equalizer by Antoine Fuqua
- Escobar: Paradise Lost by Andrea Di Stefano
- The Forger by Philip Martin
- Foxcatcher by Bennett Miller
- Haemoo by Shim Sung-bo
- Infinitely Polar Bear by Maya Forbes
- The Judge by David Dobkin
- Laggies by Lynn Shelton
- A Little Chaos by Alan Rickman
- Maps to the Stars by David Cronenberg
- The New Girlfriend by François Ozon
- Pawn Sacrifice by Edward Zwick
- The Riot Club by Lone Scherfig
- Ruth & Alex by Richard Loncraine
- Samba by Éric Toledano and Olivier Nakache
- This is Where I Leave You by Shawn Levy
- Wild by Jean-Marc Vallée

=== Special Presentations ===
- 99 Homes by Ramin Bahrani
- American Heist by Sarik Andreasyan
- Before We Go by Chris Evans
- Beyond the Lights by Gina Prince-Bythewood
- Breakup Buddies by Ning Hao
- Cake by Daniel Barnz
- Clouds of Sils Maria by Olivier Assayas
- The Cobbler by Tom McCarthy
- Coming Home by Zhang Yimou
- The Dead Lands by Toa Fraser
- Dearest by Peter Ho-Sun Chan
- Don't Go Breaking My Heart 2 by Johnnie To
- The Drop by Michaël R. Roskam
- Eden by Mia Hansen-Løve
- Elephant Song by Charles Binamé
- An Eye for Beauty by Denys Arcand
- Far from Men by David Oelhoffen
- Force Majeure by Ruben Östlund
- The Gate by Régis Wargnier
- Gemma Bovery by Anne Fontaine
- Gentlemen by Mikael Marcimain
- Gomorrah by Stefano Sollima
- Good Kill by Andrew Niccol
- The Good Lie by Philippe Falardeau
- Hector and the Search for Happiness by Peter Chelsom
- Human Highway by Bernard Shakey and Dean Stockwell
- The Humbling by Barry Levinson
- Hungry Hearts by Saverio Costanzo
- The Imitation Game by Morten Tyldum
- Kahlil Gibran's The Prophet by Roger Allers, Gaëtan Brizzi, Paul Brizzi, Joan C. Gratz, Mohammed Saeed Harib, Tomm Moore, Nina Paley, Bill Plympton, Joann Sfar and Michal Socha
- The Keeping Room by Daniel Barber
- The Last Five Years by Richard LaGravenese
- Learning to Drive by Isabel Coixet
- Love and Mercy by Bill Pohlad
- Madame Bovary by Sophie Bates
- Manglehorn by David Gordon Green
- Mary Kom by Omung Kumar
- Men, Women and Children by Jason Reitman
- Miss Julie by Liv Ullmann
- Mommy by Xavier Dolan
- Mr. Turner by Mike Leigh
- My Old Lady by Israel Horovitz
- Ned Rifle by Hal Hartley
- Nightcrawler by Dan Gilroy
- October Gale by Ruba Nadda
- Pasolini by Abel Ferrara
- Phoenix by Christian Petzold
- Preggoland by Jacob Tierney
- Pride by Matthew Warchus
- The Reach by Jean-Baptiste Leonetti
- Red Amnesia by Wang Xiaoshuai
- Return to Ithaca by Laurent Cantet
- Revenge of the Green Dragons by Andrew Lau and Andrew Loo
- Roger Waters: The Wall by Sean Evans and Roger Waters
- Rosewater by Jon Stewart
- The Search by Michel Hazanavicius
- A Second Chance by Susanne Bier
- Shelter by Paul Bettany
- The Sound and the Fury by James Franco
- St. Vincent by Theodore Melfi
- Still Alice by Richard Glatzer, Wash Westmoreland
- The Theory of Everything by James Marsh
- Three Hearts by Benoît Jacquot
- Time Out of Mind by Oren Moverman
- Top Five by Chris Rock
- Two Days, One Night by Luc Dardenne and Jean-Pierre Dardenne
- Welcome to Me by Shira Piven
- While We're Young by Noah Baumbach
- Whiplash by Damien Chazelle
- Wild Tales by Damián Szifron

=== TIFF Docs ===
- Beats of the Antonov by Hajooj Kuka
- I Am Here by Lixin Fan
- Iraqi Odyssey by Samir
- Merchants of Doubt by Robert Kenner
- National Diploma by Dieudo Hamadi
- National Gallery by Frederick Wiseman
- Natural Resistance by Jonathan Nossiter
- The Price We Pay by Harold Crooks
- Red Army by Gabe Polsky
- Seymour: An Introduction by Ethan Hawke
- Silvered Water, Syria Self-Portrait by Ossama Mohammed and Wiam Simav Bedirxan
- Sunshine Superman by Marah Strauch
- Tales of the Grim Sleeper by Nick Broomfield
- The Look of Silence by Joshua Oppenheimer
- This Is My Land by Tamara Erde
- The Yes Men Are Revolting by Laura Nix and The Yes Men
- Roger & Me by Michael Moore
- The Wanted 18 by Amer Shomali and Paul Cowan

=== Masters ===
- 1001 Grams by Bent Hamer
- A Pigeon Sat on a Branch Reflecting on Existence by Roy Andersson
- The Face of an Angel by Michael Winterbottom
- Foreign Body by Krzysztof Zanussi
- The Golden Era by Ann Hui
- Goodbye to Language by Jean-Luc Godard
- Hill of Freedom by Hong Sang-soo
- Leviathan by Andrey Zvyagintsev
- Murder in Pacot by Raoul Peck
- Revivre by Im Kwon-taek
- The Tale of Princess Kaguya by Isao Takahata
- Timbuktu by Abderrahmane Sissako
- Trick or Treaty? by Alanis Obomsawin
- Winter Sleep by Nuri Bilge Ceylan

=== Midnight Madness ===
- Rec 4: Apocalypse by Jaume Balagueró
- Big Game by Jalmari Helander
- Cub by Jonas Govaerts
- The Editor by Adam Brooks and Matthew Kennedy
- Electric Boogaloo: The Wild, Untold Story of Cannon Films by Mark Hartley
- The Guest by Adam Wingard
- It Follows by David Robert Mitchell
- Tokyo Tribe by Sion Sono
- Tusk by Kevin Smith
- What We Do in the Shadows by Taika Waititi and Jemaine Clement

=== Vanguard ===
- Alleluia by Fabrice Du Welz
- The Duke of Burgundy by Peter Strickland
- Goodnight Mommy by Veronika Franz and Severin Fiala
- Hyena by Gerard Johnson
- Luna by Dave McKean
- Over Your Dead Body by Takashi Miike
- Shrew's Nest by Juanfer Andrés and Esteban Roel
- Spring by Justin Benson and Aaron Moorhead
- They Have Escaped by JP Valkeapää
- The Voices by Marjane Satrapi
- Waste Land by Pieter Van Hees
- The World of Kanako by Tetsuya Nakashima

=== Contemporary World Cinema ===
- Aire libre by Anahí Berneri
- Amour Fou by Jessica Hausner
- Behavior by Ernesto Daranas
- Bird People by Pascale Ferran
- Black Souls by Francesco Munzi
- Breathe by Mélanie Laurent
- Charlie's Country by Rolf de Heer
- Cut Bank by Matt Shakman
- Cut Snake by Tony Ayres
- The Dark Horse by James Napier Robertson
- Don't Breathe by Nino Kirtadze
- The Farewell Party by Sharon Maymon, Tal Granit
- Felix and Meira by Maxime Giroux
- Frailer by Mijke de Jong
- Gett: The Trial of Viviane Amsalem by Ronit Elkabetz, Shlomi Elkabetz
- Girlhood by Céline Sciamma
- The Grump by Dome Karukoski
- Heartbeat by Andrea Dorfman
- High Society by Julie Lopes Curval
- Impunity by Jyoti Mistry
- In the Crosswind by Martti Helde
- Itsi Bitsi by Ole Christian Madsen
- Justice by Joel Lamangan
- Kabukicho Love Hotel by Ryūichi Hiroki
- Kill Me Three Times by Kriv Stenders
- Labyrinth of Lies by Giulio Ricciarelli
- Leopardi by Mario Martone
- The Lesson by Kristina Grozeva, Petar Valchanov
- Li'l Quinquin by Bruno Dumont
- Love in the Time of Civil War by Rodrigue Jean
- Lulu by Luis Ortega
- Margarita, with a Straw by Shonali Bose
- Meet Me in Montenegro by Alex Holdridge, Linnea Saasen
- Men Who Save the World by Liew Seng Tat
- Mirage by Szabolcs Hajdu
- Modris by Juris Kursietis
- Not My Type by Lucas Belvaux
- Out of Nature by Ole Giæver
- The Owners by Adilkhan Yerzhanov
- Partners in Crime by Chang Jung-Chi
- The Reaper by Zvonimir Jurić
- Red Rose by Sepideh Farsi
- Sand Dollars by Laura Amelia Guzmán, Israel Cárdenas
- Still the Water by Naomi Kawase
- Tales by Rakhshan Bani-E'temad
- Teen Lust by Blaine Thurier
- Tigers by Danis Tanovic
- Today by Reza Mirkarimi
- Tokyo Fiancée by Stefan Liberski
- Tour de Force by Christian Zübert
- Two Shots Fired by Martín Rejtman
- The Valley by Ghassan Salhab
- Venice by Kiki Álvarez
- Voice Over by Cristián Jiménez
- Where I Am King by Carlos Siguion-Reyna
- Who Am I – No System Is Safe by Baran bo Odar
- Xenia by Panos H. Koutras
- You're Sleeping Nicole by Stéphane Lafleur

=== Short Cuts Canada ===
42 short films were presented as part of Short Cuts Canada in 2014:

- An Apartment — Sarah Galea-Davis
- Around Is Around — Norman McLaren
- The Barnhouse (La Grange) — Caroline Mailloux
- Bison — Kevan Funk
- Broken Face (Sale gueule) — Alain Fournier
- Burnt Grass — Ray Wong
- Chainreaction — Dana Gingras
- Chamber Drama — Jeffrey Zablotny
- CODA — Denis Poulin, Martine Époque
- Day 40 — Sol Friedman
- Del Ciego Desert — François Leduc
- A Delusion of Grandeur (Une idée de grandeur) — Vincent Biron
- The Encounter (La Rencontre) — Frieda Luk
- Entangled — Tony Elliott
- Father — Jordan Tannahill
- Fire (Fuoco) — Raha Shirazi
- Godhead — Connor Gaston
- Hole — Martin Edralin
- Indigo — Amanda Strong
- Intruders — Santiago Menghini
- Kajutaijuq: The Spirit That Comes — Scott Brachmayer
- Last Night — Arlen Konopaki
- Light — Yassmina Karajah
- Liompa — Elizabeth Lazebnik
- Luk'Luk'I: Mother — Wayne Wapeemukwa
- Me and My Moulton — Torill Kove
- Migration — Mark Lomond, Johanne Ste-Marie
- Mynarski Death Plummet (Mynarski chute mortel) — Matthew Rankin
- O Canada — Evelyn Lambart
- On Cement (Sur le ciment) — Robin Aubert
- Red Alert — Barry Avrich
- Running Season — Grayson Moore
- Sahar — Alexander Farah
- The Sands (Plage de sable) — Marie-Ève Juste
- Sleeping Giant — Andrew Cividino
- Still — Slater Jewell-Kemker
- Take Me (Prends-moi) — André Turpin, Anaïs Barbeau-Lavalette
- A Tomb with a View — Ryan J. Noth
- The Underground — Michelle Latimer
- The Weatherman and the Shadowboxer — Randall Okita
- What Doesn't Kill You — Rob Grant
- Zero Recognition — Ben Lewis

=== Discovery ===
- '71 by Yann Demange
- Adult Beginners by Ross Katz
- Atlantic by Jan-Willem van Ewijk
- Backcountry by Adam MacDonald
- Bang Bang Baby by Jeffrey St. Jules
- Big Muddy by Jefferson Moneo
- Corbo by Mathieu Denis
- The Crow's Egg by M. Manikandan
- Dukhtar by Afia Nathaniel
- Flapping in the Middle of Nowhere by Nguyen Hoang Diep
- The Great Man by Sarah Leonor
- Guidance by Pat Mills
- I Am Not Lorena by Isidora Marras
- In Her Place by Albert Shin
- The Intruder by Shariff Korver
- La Salada by Juan Martin Hsu
- Life in a Fishbowl by Baldvin Zophoniasson
- The Little Death by Josh Lawson
- Los Hongos by Oscar Ruiz Navia
- Magical Girl by Carlos Vermut
- Mardan by Batin Ghobadi
- May Allah Bless France! by Abd al Malik
- The Narrow Frame of Midnight by Tala Hadid
- Obra by Gregorio Graziosi
- Red Alert by Barry Avrich
- Run by Philippe Lacote
- Second Coming by Debbie Tucker Green
- Without Pity by Michele Alhaique
- Songs She Wrote About People She Knows by Kris Elgstrand
- Stories of Our Lives by Jim Chuchu and The Nest Collective
- Sway by Rooth Tang
- Theeb by Naji Abu Nowar
- The Tribe by Myroslav Slaboshpytskiy
- Unlucky Plaza by Ken Kwek
- The Valley Below by Kyle Thomas
- The Vanished Elephant by Javier Fuentes-León
- Villa Touma by Suha Arraf
- We Were Wolves by Jordan Canning
- Wet Bum by Lindsay MacKay
- X+Y by Morgan Matthews

=== City to City: Seoul ===
- Alive by Park Jung-bum
- Cart by Boo Ji-Young
- Confession by Lee Do-yun
- A Dream of Iron by Kelvin Kyung Kun Park
- A Girl at My Door by July Jung
- Gyeongju by Zhang Lu
- A Hard Day by Kim Seong-hun
- Scarlet Innocence by Yim Pil-sung

== Canada's Top Ten ==
In December, TIFF programmers released their annual Canada's Top Ten list of the films selected as the ten best Canadian films of 2014. The selected films received a follow-up screening at the TIFF Bell Lightbox as a "Canada's Top Ten" minifestival in January 2015.

=== Features ===
- Corbo by Mathieu Denis
- Felix and Meira by Maxime Giroux
- In Her Place by Albert Shin
- Maps to the Stars by David Cronenberg
- Mommy by Xavier Dolan
- Monsoon by Sturla Gunnarsson
- The Price We Pay by Harold Crooks
- Sol by Marie-Hélène Cousineau and Susan Avingaq
- Tu dors Nicole by Stéphane Lafleur
- Violent by Andrew Huculiak

=== Short films ===
- Bison by Kevan Funk
- The Cut (La Coupe) by Geneviève Dulude-De Celles
- Cutaway by Kazik Radwanski
- Day 40 by Sol Friedman
- Kajutaijuq: The Spirit That Comes by Scott Brachmayer
- Mynarski Death Plummet (Mynarski chute mortel) by Matthew Rankin
- Rebel (Bihttoš) by Elle-Máijá Tailfeathers
- Sleeping Giant by Andrew Cividino
- Still by Slater Jewell-Kemker
- The Weatherman and the Shadowboxer by Randall Okita
