= Blitz (2011 film) =

2011 British action thriller film

- Theatrical release poster
- Directed by: Elliott Lester
- Written by: Nathan Parker
- Based on: Blitz by Ken Bruen
- Produced by: Steven Chasman; Zygi Kamasa; Donald Kushner; Brad Wyman
- Starring: Jason Statham; Paddy Considine; Aidan Gillen; Zawe Ashton; David Morrissey
- Cinematography: Rob Hardy
- Edited by: John Gilbert
- Music by: Ilan Eshkeri
- Production companies: Davis Films; Lipsync Productions
- Distributed by: Lionsgate UK
- Release date: 20 May 2011
- Running time: 97 minutes
- Country: United Kingdom
- Language: English
- Box office: $15.8 million

Blitz is a 2011 British action thriller film directed by Elliott Lester, written by Nathan Parker, and starring Jason Statham, Paddy Considine, Aidan Gillen and David Morrissey. The film is based on the 2002 novel of the same name by Ken Bruen, which features his recurring characters Detective Sergeant Tom Brant and Chief Inspector James Roberts. The narrative follows a violent police officer trying to catch a serial killer who has been murdering police officers in South East London.

The film was released in the United Kingdom by Lionsgate UK on 20 May 2011.

== Plot ==
A serial killer is targeting police officers in South East London. After two police constables are shot dead and Chief Inspector Bruce Roberts is bludgeoned to death, the hunt for the killer's identity begins.

Sergeant Porter Nash is transferred to the South East London branch of the police to head the investigation, though Nash is ridiculed by his fellow officers for being openly gay. He finds an unlikely ally in the hot-headed, gruff Detective Sergeant Tom Brant, who tends to get violent with perpetrators.

One of Brant's informants, Radnor, points Brant and Nash toward a man named Barry Weiss, who recently bragged about setting a police dog on fire "for practice". Brant and Nash visit Weiss' flat but find no evidence against him. Brant recognises Weiss as the man he brutally beat up in a billiard hall a year earlier after catching Weiss beating others. Radnor decides to conduct an investigation of his own and discovers the car where Weiss keeps the trophies of his kills, confirming that Weiss is the killer.

Weiss contacts a newspaper reporter, Harold Dunlop, to make sure his murders get enough coverage in the press. He declares he wishes to be known as the Blitz. Dunlop is also contacted by Radnor, who is interested in selling his information for money. Although Radnor leads Dunlop to Weiss' car, Weiss sees them and kills Radnor before he can disclose Weiss' name. Dunlop alerts the police to the car, but they find it empty, as Weiss has removed the evidence.

Brant looks up Weiss and realises that all of his victims have been police officers who have arrested Weiss in his past misdemeanors and that his colleague PC Elizabeth Falls is likely next. Falls is attacked by Weiss but saved by Metal, a young gang member she is protective over. Metal is killed before Weiss escapes.

Brant and Nash release a picture of Weiss to the media to flush him out, which leads to his capture. However, there is no concrete evidence against him, so the police are forced to let him go. Exasperated, Brant and Nash devise a plot to trick him, knowing that Brant will be targeted, as Weiss wants revenge for the billiard hall fight.

Weiss infiltrates the funeral of Chief Inspector Roberts, dressed in Roberts' uniform, which he had stolen after murdering him. During the service, Brant leaves, followed by an armed Weiss. Brant leads him to the top of a parking garage, only to reveal that Brant and Nash have switched places. Weiss is beaten and overpowered. Explaining that they will never find enough evidence to convict him legally, Brant concludes that they are now in a convenient situation: since Weiss is dressed as a police officer, they can shoot him with Weiss' own gun, and it will look as if Weiss was just another of the Blitz's victims. Brant shoots Weiss dead, musing that the case will now officially remain "unresolved".

== Cast ==
- Jason Statham as DS Tom Brant
- Paddy Considine as Porter Nash, an acting inspector and Tom's partner
- Aidan Gillen as Barry "Blitz" Weiss, a deranged serial cop killer
- David Morrissey as Harold Dunlop
- Zawe Ashton as WPC Elizabeth Falls
- Luke Evans as DI Craig Stokes
- Mark Rylance as CI Bruce Roberts
- Nicky Henson as Superintendent Brown
- Ned Dennehy as Radnor
- Ron Donachie as Cross

== Production ==
The film's script was written by Nathan Parker. The film was shot in London in August 2010. Blitz was the first film produced by Lionsgate UK.

== Reception ==
=== Box office ===
Blitz grossed a worldwide total of $15,774,948. The film earned a further $3,065,744 from Domestic DVD & Blu-ray sales.

=== Critical response ===
Blitz received mixed reviews from critics. On Rotten Tomatoes the film has an approval rating of 48% based on reviews from 25 critics. The website's critics consensus reads, "A middling crime thriller largely assembled from wearyingly familiar parts, Blitz sacks a game Jason Statham's performance behind the line of genre scrimmage."

David Hughes of Empire gave the film three out of five stars and wrote: "A rough-cut crime thriller that sees Jason Statham back on familiar turf and doing what he does best." Cath Clarke of The Guardian gave the film a positive review and wrote: "Who knows, we might be looking at the evolution of the guilty-pleasure movie – padded out with top-drawer talent to spare audience blushes."
