= High fantasy (disambiguation) =

High fantasy is a subgenre of fantasy fiction. This term may also refer to:

- High Fantasy (film) (2017) directed by Jenna Bass
- High Fantasy (role-playing game) (1978) published by Fantasy Productions
