= The Great Man (disambiguation) =

The Great Man is 1956 American drama film directed by and starring José Ferrer, based on a novel by Al Morgan.

The Great Man may also refer to:

- The Great Man (2014 film), a French drama film
- The Great Man (novel), a 2007 Kate Christensen novel
- William Pitt, 1st Earl of Chatham (1708–1778), English statesman known as "The Great Man"
- The Great Man (play), a 2000 play by David Williamson
- Great Man (film), a 1951 French drama film

== See also ==
- Great man theory, a 19th-century idea according to which history can be largely explained by the impact of great men
