= The Weatherman and the Shadowboxer =

- Film poster
- Directed by: Randall Okita
- Written by: Randall Okita
- Produced by: Maral Mohammadian; Michael Fukushima
- Edited by: Mike Reisacher
- Music by: Joseph Murray; Lodewijk Vos
- Production company: National Film Board of Canada
- Release date: September 7, 2014 (TIFF)
- Running time: 9 minutes
- Country: Canada
- Language: English

The Weatherman and the Shadowboxer is a 2014 Canadian short film directed by Randall Okita. Mixing live action with animation, the film depicts two brothers whose shared childhood traumas have led them in very different directions as adults: one, the "weatherman", has become a cautious, careful man who tries to protect himself by obsessively predicting the future, while the other, the "shadowboxer", has become an aggressive, violent man who is constantly fighting the past.

The film was acted live, but the actors were then replaced with animated silhouettes depicting their inner emotional lives with abstract shapes and images.

== Awards ==
The film won the award for Best Canadian Short Film at the 2014 Toronto International Film Festival, and was named to the festival's year-end Canada's Top Ten list of the year's ten best Canadian shorts. It also won awards for Best Short Film at the Festival du nouveau cinéma in Montreal, Best Experimental Short Film at both the New York Short Film Festival and LA Shorts Fest, as well as Best Cinematography at the Berlin International Short Film Festival.
