= Peter Gregson (cellist) =

- Born: 1987 (age 38–39)
- Genres: Contemporary; Classical
- Occupation: Cellist
- Instruments: Acoustic and Electric Cello; Synthesizer
- Labels: cabinbaggage; Deutsche Grammophon/Universal Classics
- Website: www.petergregson.co.uk
- Peter Gregson's voice recorded November 2012

Peter Gregson (born 1987) is a cellist and composer.

He was born in Edinburgh and was educated at the Edinburgh Academy and the Royal Academy of Music.

Gregson composed the score for the 2015 film A Little Chaos, marking his first major film scoring job. Richard Lawson of Vanity Fair named it his favourite score of the year, dubbing it "a string-heavy stunner", though Dennis Harvey writing for Variety magazine described it as "clichéd, saccharine score". Gregson was interviewed as part of BBC Radio Ulster's Classical Connections with John Toal programme in May 2015.

He arranged the cello cover of Charli XCX's "360" for Bridgerton season four on Netflix.

In 2026, his "6.6 Gigue" piece was included as one of the tracks on the "Radio Opus" in the Forza Horizon 6 video game.

== Recordings ==
- 2009: Howard Goodall's Gramophone award winning albums, Enchanted Voices and Enchanted Carols.
- 2010: Peter Gregson (cellist)'s debut album, Terminal
- 2011: Max Richter & Johann Johannsson Gregson Richter Johannsson
- 2012: Gabriel Prokofiev's Cello Multitracks.
- 2013: Peter Gregson (cellist)'s ballet score, FLOW.
- 2014: Peter Gregson (cellist)'s second studio album, Lights in the Sky.
- 2018: Recomposed by Peter Gregson: Bach – The Cello Suites
- 2021: An Evening at Capitol Studios: Bach Recomposed - EP
- 2022: Quartets: One – Four

== Background music ==
- Songs of Paradise (TBA)
