= Hajooj Kuka =

Sudanese film director

- Born: Sudan
- Citizenship: Sudanese
- Education: American University of Beirut, San Jose State University
- Occupations: Director, War Correspondent
- Years active: 2004–present
- Notable work: Beats of the Antonov, aKasha

Hajooj Kuka is the founder of Refugee Club and the director of Beats of the Antonov and Akasha. Kuka was born in Sudan of the Mahas ethnic group, but relocated with his family to Abu Dhabi. Kuka travels frequently between Nuba Mountains and the Blue Niles for his creative works. He resides in both Sudan and Kenya.

In 2020 he was admitted as a member of the Academy of Motion Picture Arts and Sciences.

== Education ==
Kuka studied Electrical Engineering at American University of Beirut (AUB) and Digital Design at San Jose State University, California, USA. He began taking a variety of art classes which gradually led to his interest in filmmaking.

== Career ==
Kuka moved back to Nuba around 2012 and begin working on documentary projects. In 2014 his documentary Beats of the Antonov about war, music, and identity won the People's Choice Award at 2014 Toronto International Film Festival. Kuka worked on this documentary for two years with the aim of telling a story that worth sharing with the world. Through his efforts, Kuka was listed in the Foreign Policy magazine as one of the Leading Global Thinkers of 2014 in the Chroniclers category. He also co-founded a Sudanese artist collective called The Refugee Club, whose members include the Sudanese-American singer Alsarah.

In 2018, Kuka directed his first narrative feature film aKasha, which premiered at the Venice Film Festival in August 2018.

Kuka is also a war correspondent in the Nuba Mountains of Sudan.

== Activism ==
Kuka is an active member of Girifna, a non-violent resistance movement in Sudan. Kuka works with various activists in Sudan and in the diaspora for a transformed state of affairs in the country. Despite the non-violence stance, the Sudanese government hunts, tortures and jails Sudanese activists at will, and Kuka who has been detained himself, protests for their releases.

In September 2020, Kuka was one of several artists arrested after religious militants attacked a theatre rehearsal where he was participating. Several film industry figures, including producer Steven Markovitz and Toronto International Film Festival artistic director Cameron Bailey, called on the Sudanese government to immediately release Kuka and the other artists.
