= Don't Breathe (2014 film) =

2014 film

- Film poster
- Directed by: Nino Kirtadze
- Written by: Nino Kirtadze
- Produced by: Heidi Fleisher; Céline Nusse; Paul Rozenberg; Sami Jahnukainen
- Starring: Levan Murtazashvili
- Cinematography: Octávio Espírito Santo; Jacek Petrycki; Andro Sanovich; Tornike Shengelia
- Edited by: Christel Aubert; Nino Kirtadze; Josiane Zardoya
- Release date: 6 September 2014 (TIFF)
- Running time: 86 minutes
- Country: France
- Language: Georgian

Don't Breathe is a 2014 Georgian-language French documentary film directed by Nino Kirtadze. It was screened in the Contemporary World Cinema section at the 2014 Toronto International Film Festival.

== Cast ==
- Levan Murtazashvili
- Irma Inaridze
