= Beats of the Antonov =

- Film poster
- Directed by: Hajooj Kuka
- Produced by: Hajooj Kuka, Steven Markovitz
- Starring: Sudanese refugees
- Cinematography: Hajooj Kuka
- Edited by: Hajooj Kuka, Khalid Shamis
- Release date: 5 September 2014 (TIFF)
- Running time: 68 minutes
- Countries: Sudan; South Africa
- Language: Arabic

Beats of the Antonov is a documentary film released in 2014. It is a Sudanese-South African coproduction, directed by Sudanese filmmaker Hajooj Kuka and produced by Hajooj Kuka and Steven Markovitz. The film documents the Sudan–SRF conflict in the Blue Nile and Nuba Mountains regions, focusing in particular on the role of music in helping the affected communities to sustain themselves culturally and spiritually in the face of the ongoing conflict.

This documentary, that "put Sudan's name on the screen of world cinema", was made over a period of two years, with film director Hajooj Kuka residing among the people of the Nuba Mountains in Southern Sudan.

== Premise ==
The premise of Beats of the Antonov is that the core reason for the civil war in Sudan is an identity issue. Over many years, the central government in Sudan has enforced an Arab-Islamic identity on the other 56 major ethnic groups of Sudan. However, in reality Sudan has a diverse population with multi-cultural backgrounds. Through the documentary, Hajooj Kuka depicts the resilience of the people of the Blue Nile and Nuba Mountains areas of Sudan through life-celebrating music and dance, despite their daily struggle to survive in a war-torn society.

== Reviews ==
The film won the People's Choice Award for Best Documentary at the 2014 Toronto International Film Festival and was well-reviewed by Indiewire, Point of View, The Guardian, Variety and Africa is a Country among others.

== Awards and nominations ==
Year	Award	Category	Work	Result
2014	Toronto International Film Festival, Canada	People's Choice Award for Documentaries	Beats of the Antonov	Won
2015	Luxor African Film Festival, Egypt	Grand Nile Prize for Best Feature Documentary	Beats of the Antonov	Won
2015	Cordoba African Film Festival, Spain	The Best Documentary Award	Beats of the Antonov	Won
2015	Durban International Film Festival, South Africa	Best Documentary and the Artwatch Africa freedom of expression award	Beats of the Antonov	Won
2015	Festival de cinémas d'Afrique in Angers, France	Best film both jury and public award	Beats of the Antonov	Won
2015	San Francisco International Film Festival	Golden Gates Awards Documentary Feature	Beats of the Antonov	Nominated
2016	FAME, la Gaîté lyrique's cinema and pop culture festival, France	MUBI Prize	Beats of the Antonov	Won

== Festival appearances ==
Festival	Date	Type
Toronto International Film Festival	4–14 September 2014	World premiere
International Documentary Film Festival Amsterdam	19–30 November 2014	European premiere
Festival des 3 Continents	25 November – 2 December 2014	French premiere
Journées Cinématographiques de Carthage (JCC)	29 November – 6 December 2014	North African premiere
Dubai International Film Festival	10 – 17 December 2014	Middle Eastern premiere
Goteborg Film Festival	23 January – 2 February 2015	Swedish premiere
Festival panafricain du cinéma et de la télévision de Ouagadougou (FESPACO)	28 February – 7 March 2015	African premiere
International Film Festival and Forum on Human Rights (FIFDH)	17 February – 8 March 2015	Swiss premiere
Luxor African Film Festival	16 – 21 March 2015	Egyptian premiere
Human Rights Watch Film Festival	19 – 27 March 2015	UK premiere
Flatpack Film Festival	19–29 March 2015	Birmingham premiere, UK
Festival de Cine Africano	21 – 28 March 2015	Spain premiere
Panama International Film Festival	9 – 15 April 2015	Latin American premiere
San Francisco International Film Festival	23 April – 7 May 2015	US premiere
Maryland Film Festival	6–10 May 2015	East Coast U.S. premiere
club transmediale	30 January – 7 February 2016	German premiere

== See also ==
- Cinema of Sudan
