= Akasha (2018 film) =

2018 film directed by Hajooj Kuka

aKasha
- Film poster
- Directed by: Hajooj Kuka
- Written by: Hajooj Kuka
- Produced by: Hajooj Kuka; Steven Markovitz
- Starring: Ekram Marcus; Kamal Ramadan; Mohamed Chakado
- Cinematography: Giovanni P. Autran; Hajooj Kuka
- Edited by: Hajooj Kuka
- Music by: Nancy Mounir; Alsarah
- Production companies: Big World Cinema; Refugee Club; Komplizen Film
- Release date: August 31, 2018 (Venice)
- Running time: 78 minutes
- Countries: Sudan; South Africa; Qatar; Germany
- Language: Arabic

Akasha (stylized as aKasha; transl. The round-up) is a 2018 Sudanese comedic film written and directed by Hajooj Kuka about a Sudanese soldier caught between his love for his girlfriend and his AK-47. Kuka previously directed several documentaries. Akasha is his first narrative film and premiered at the Venice Film Festival on August 31, 2018.

== Plot ==
Adnan has earned time off from his duty as a revolutionary soldier for shooting down a MiG fighter plane, and now professes his love to the AK-47 responsible for the shot, naming the gun Nancy. His girlfriend Lina is not happy about this other love, so she kicks him out. Over the next 24 hours, his commander tries to round up all the deserters, and Adnan concocts a series of plans to retrieve Nancy, which he accidentally left in Lina's house. Along the way he's aided by another deserter, Absi, who believes in pacifism.

== Cast ==
- Kamal Ramadan as Adnan
- Ekram Marcus as Lina
- Mohamed Chakado as Absi
- Abdallah Alnur as Blues

== Production ==
Kuka met two of the lead actors, Mohamed Chakado and Kamal Ramadan, while teaching drama at a local youth centre, and decided to cast them in the film. He cast Ekram Marcus to play Lina because she is so similar to the character: choosing to pursue education rather than get married.

== Release ==
The film premiered at the Venice Film Festival on August 31, 2018, and screened at the Toronto International Film Festival. Two of the actors, Kamal Ramadan and Mohamed Chakado, could not attend the festivals because Uganda refused to allow their departure while awaiting their refugee status papers. The film also screened at the Africa in Motion festival in Edinburgh.

== Reception ==
aKasha received mixed reviews. Alvise Mainardi of Non Solo Cinema wrote that even though the low budget is evident, it's hard not to like it. Martina Barone of Cinematographe felt that while the actors' performances often drag down the quality of the film, this debut shows that the director has a talent for film-making.

== See also ==
- Cinema of Sudan
