= A Little Chaos =

2014 British period drama film

- Theatrical release poster
- Directed by: Alan Rickman
- Screenplay by: Alison Deegan; Alan Rickman; Jeremy Brock
- Story by: Alison Deegan
- Produced by: Gail Egan; Andrea Calderwood; Bertrand Faivre
- Starring: Kate Winslet; Matthias Schoenaerts; Alan Rickman; Stanley Tucci; Helen McCrory; Steven Waddington; Jennifer Ehle
- Cinematography: Ellen Kuras
- Edited by: Nicolas Gaster
- Music by: Peter Gregson
- Production companies: BBC Films; Lipsync Productions; Potboiler Productions; The Bureau; Kia Jam Productions; Artemis Films
- Distributed by: Lionsgate UK
- Release dates: 13 September 2014 (TIFF); 17 April 2015
- Running time: 117 minutes
- Country: United Kingdom
- Language: English
- Box office: $10.1 million

A Little Chaos is a 2014 British period drama film directed by Alan Rickman, based on a story conceived by Alison Deegan, who co-wrote the screenplay with Rickman and Jeremy Brock. It stars Kate Winslet, Matthias Schoenaerts, Rickman, Stanley Tucci, Helen McCrory, Steven Waddington, Jennifer Ehle and Rupert Penry-Jones. It was financed by Lionsgate UK and produced by BBC Films. The second film directed by Rickman, after his 1997 debut The Winter Guest, and the last before his death in 2016, it was also the second collaboration of Rickman and Winslet after their 1995 film Sense and Sensibility. Production took place in London in mid-2013, and it premiered as the closing night film at the 2014 Toronto International Film Festival on 13 September 2014.

== Plot ==
King Louis XIV of France assigns the design and construction of the Gardens of Versailles to his head landscape architect André Le Nôtre. Already managing numerous large projects, Le Nôtre interviews other landscape designers to whom he might be able to delegate some of the work. One of the candidates is Sabine de Barra, who is that rare thing in the 17th century: an independent professional woman.

When Sabine arrives on the palace grounds for her interview, she pauses to move a potted plant in the courtyard. Seeing this, André asks during the interview if she prizes order in design. When pressed, Sabine suggests that she would rather create something uniquely French than follow classical and Renaissance styles. André reminds her that everything he has built and designed follows order. Sabine apologizes and sincerely expresses admiration for him and his work, but André abruptly shows her the door.

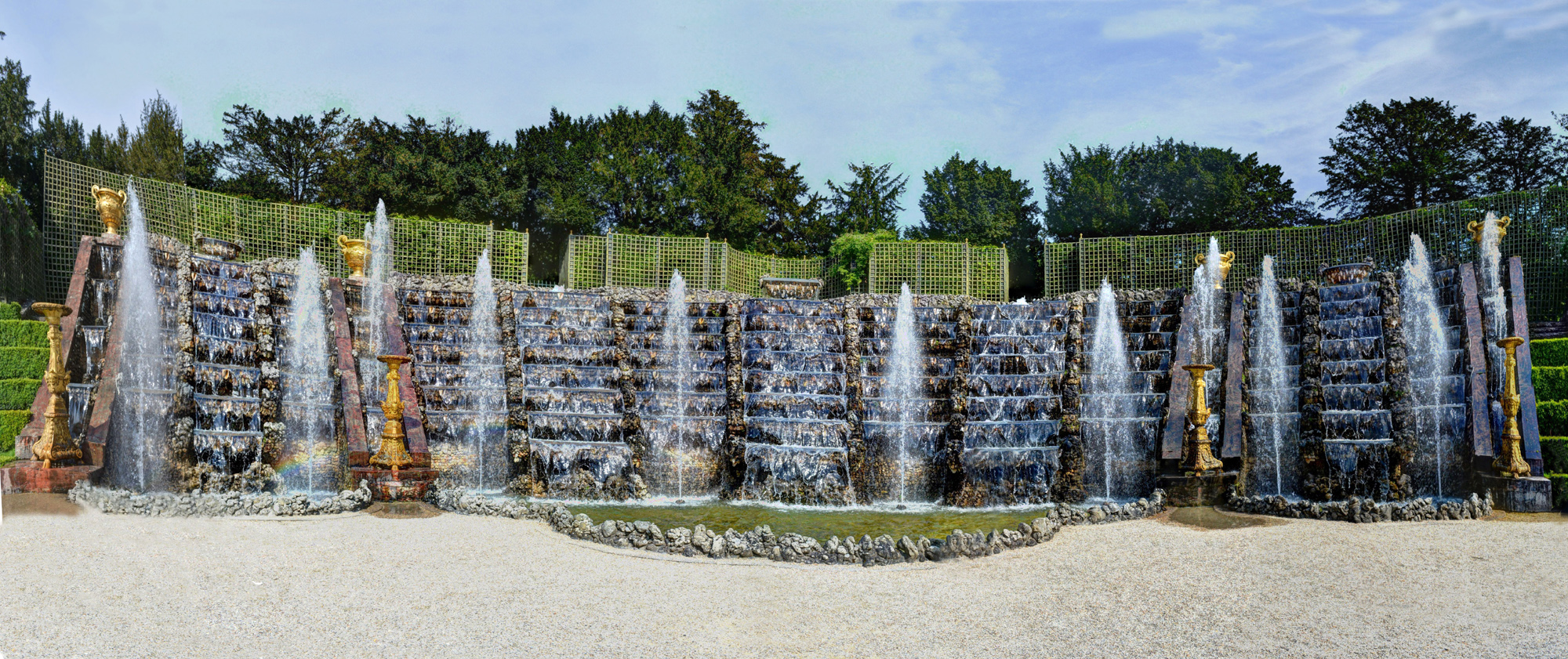
Bosquet de la Salle-de-Bal at Gardens of Versailles, laid out by André Le Nôtre between 1680 and 1683.

André mulls over the candidates, under pressure to please the King. His assistant judiciously re-presents Madame de Barra's designs to him, prompting André to reconsider them.

André surprises Sabine at her home that evening, and after admiring her seemingly untamed but magical garden, assigns to her the outdoor bosquet ballroom project at Versailles, which combines fountains and landscaping. His original plans require a costly fresh water supply; Sabine suggests continuously recycling water through the fountains using a reservoir.

Sabine is befriended at court by the King's brother Duc Philippe d'Orléans and his wife Elizabeth Charlotte, Princess Palatine. Sabine and André are mutually attracted but do not act on their feelings due to André's marriage and their professional relationship.

Queen Maria Theresa dies suddenly. Stunned at her loss, the King takes refuge in the gardens at the Château de Marly, among the pear trees. Sabine finds him there, initially mistaking him for the gardener with whom she had hoped to trade some plants. The King enjoys her warmth and forthrightness, and even after she recognizes him, they continue their conversation as equals. He invites her to travel with him to the Palace of Fontainebleau.

André has been enduring his wife Françoise's infidelities; Françoise insists that the key to his success is her relationships and influence at court. When she senses his interest in Sabine and warns him against an affair, he quotes to her her own words about their right to seek comfort elsewhere.

Back at the Versailles garden site, Françoise confronts Sabine, and states that André's interest in her is transient. Later that night, Françoise's lover, at her request, opens the reservoir's sluice gates during a powerful storm, flooding the worksite and destroying much of the earthworks. Sabine nearly drowns trying to close it, but André arrives in time to rescue her. The next morning, she works vigorously to mend the damage. André later finds Françoise's glove there. Realizing she is behind the sabotage, he confronts her and effectively ends their relationship.

Sabine is introduced around court by the Duc de Lauzun and the King's mistress, the Marquise de Montespan. Once the Marquise and her female courtiers discover that Sabine is widowed and has also lost her 6-year-old daughter, they share their own losses and welcome her into their company.

The Marquise formally presents Sabine to the King when he arrives. Sabine offers him a Four Seasons rose – the same found in the garden where they had met. Conversing about the nature of roses and their life cycle, Sabine metaphorically defends Madame de Montespan, who has begun to lose the King's favor. Louis is again moved by Sabine's observations, calling her "a wise rose."

André waits for Sabine outside her home that night, and they finally have sex. In the morning, André finds himself alone in bed; Sabine is upstairs, traumatized by a recurring flashback of the day her daughter and husband died: prior to taking their daughter with him on a day trip, her husband revealed to Sabine that he had a mistress. Sabine saw that the carriage had a faulty wheel and racing after them, tried to stop the carriage. It veered off track, toppling down a steep hill and killing both father and daughter.

André finds Sabine mid-flashback, and convinces her to stop blaming herself for their deaths, calming her down.

At the inauguration of Sabine's completed bosquet garden, the King and his court arrive and dance to the music of a hidden orchestra, as the fountains send water coursing down the tiers around the outdoor ballroom floor. After Sabine dances with the King, she and André join hands and leave to walk into the forest together. The camera pulls slowly back and above the entire grounds of Versailles, revealing the enormous sweep of its grandeur.

== Cast ==
- Kate Winslet as Sabine de Barra
- Matthias Schoenaerts as André Le Nôtre
- Alan Rickman as Louis XIV
- Stanley Tucci as Philippe, Duc d'Orléans
- Helen McCrory as Madame Le Nôtre
- Steven Waddington as Thierry Duras
- Jennifer Ehle as Madame de Montespan
- Rupert Penry-Jones as Antoine Lauzun
- Paula Paul as Princess Palatine
- Danny Webb as Claude Moulin
- Phyllida Law as Suzanne
- Fidelis Morgan as Anne
- Alistair Petrie as De Ville
- Mia Threapleton as Helene

== Production ==
The story was conceived by Allison Deegan, who co-wrote the screenplay with Alan Rickman and Jeremy Brock. The film was financed by Lionsgate UK and produced by BBC Films.

Production began in March 2013. Producer Zygi Kamasa of Lionsgate said: "We are delighted to be working with the best of British actors and directors like Kate Winslet and Alan Rickman as we move forward in doubling our investment in British films in 2014." Rickman said: "The film is not just frills at the wrists and collars. It's about people getting their hands dirty and building something in order to entertain the other world they serve. It's about how one world maintains the other, often at the cost of women."

=== Casting ===
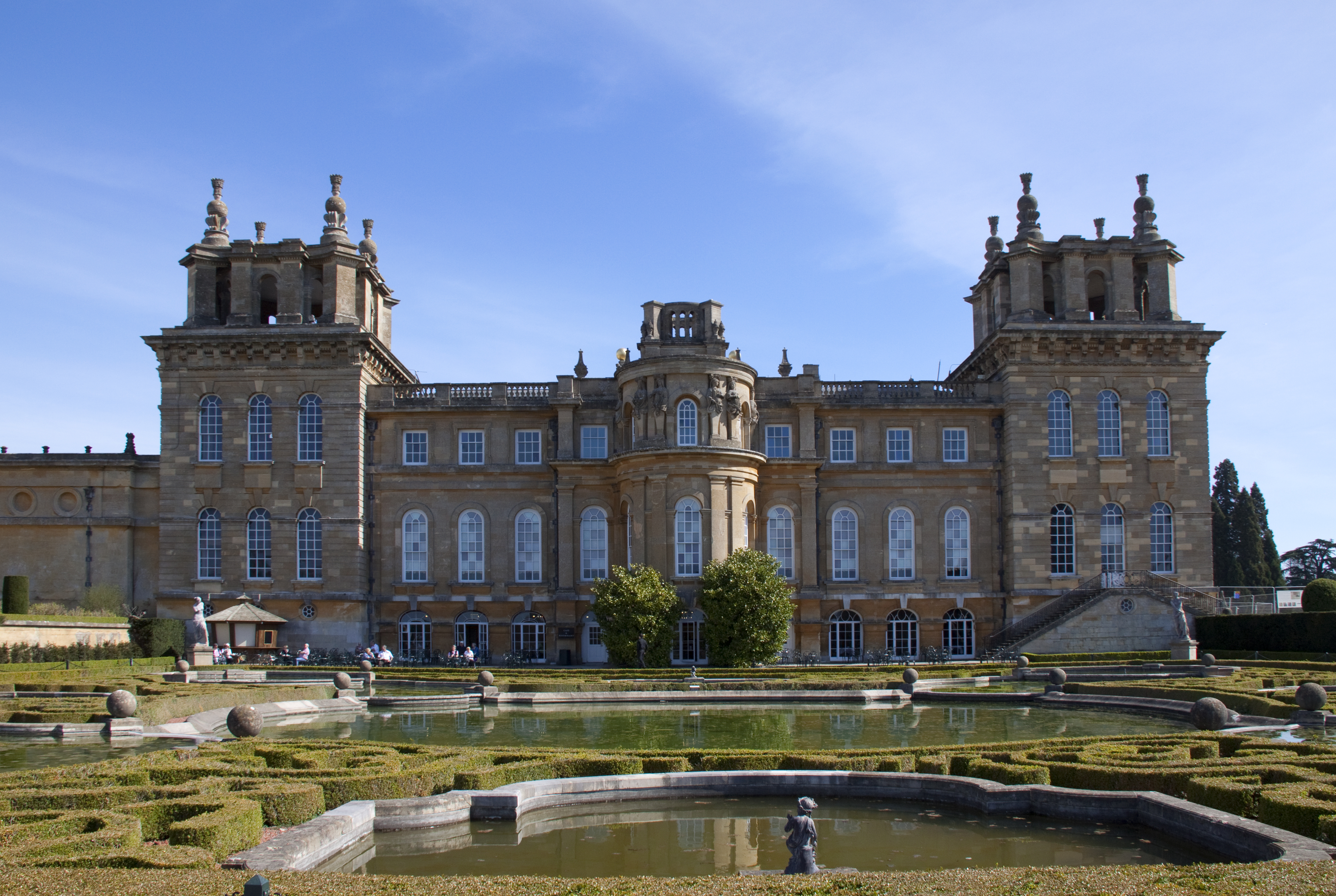
Landscape scenes were shot at Blenheim Palace.

On 17 January 2013, it was announced that Winslet and Matthias Schoenaerts had been cast in the lead roles. Rickman had Winslet in mind for the lead role of Sabine de Barra and continued with her when two weeks into shooting, Winslet announced that she was pregnant. In addition to director, Rickman took the role of Louis XIV. He explained that "the only way I could do it was because in a way, he's like a director, Louis, so you kind of keep the same expression on your face. As a director, you see everything somehow. It's like a huge all-encompassing eye that sees everything, and it's able to cherry pick; ‘Move that,’ ‘Don't do that,’ ‘Do it this way,’ ‘Change this colour.’ And I don't know where that comes from, but it does, once you're given the job, and I have a feeling Louis probably would've been a great film director."

=== Filming ===
Despite being set in France, the entirety of filming took place in England. Principal photography commenced on 27 March 2013 and continued over eight weeks in Black Park, Cliveden House, Pinewood Studios, Blenheim Palace, Waddesdon Manor, Hampton Court Palace, Ham House, Ashridge, and Chenies Manor. Filming ended on 8 June 2013 in Richmond, London.

According to Rickman, filming "wasn't easy, though; throwing Kate into freezing water at 1 a.m., the carriage crash, scenes with 80 extras, tight schedules in venues like Blenheim Palace. It's a constant tap dance between control and freedom and of course the budget guides everything."

=== Historical accuracy ===
Some of the characters are fictional, including Kate Winslet's Sabine. The film is set in 1682, but André Le Nôtre began work at Versailles in 1661. Le Nôtre was nearly seventy in 1682, twice the age he appears to be as portrayed by Schoenaerts. A garden much like that in the film exists at Versailles, the Salle de Bal or Bosquet de la Salle-de-Bal (the Forest Ballroom).

== Music ==
A Little Chaos : Original Motion Picture Soundtrack

Soundtrack album by Peter Gregson
- Released: 16 April 2015
- Recorded: Various times
- Genre: Soundtrack
- Length: 41:11
- Label: Milan Records
- Producer: Peter Gregson

Peter Gregson chronology
Every Quiet Moment (2014)	A Little Chaos : Original Motion Picture Soundtrack (2015)

The soundtrack was composed by Peter Gregson. It was the first feature film for Gregson, who previously composed music for a 2014 short film Every Quiet Moment. Veigar Margeirsson's 2008 composition "Rise above" was used in the trailer of the film but was not part of soundtrack album, which was released by Milan Records on 16 April 2015.

No.	Title	Music	Length
1.	"Sabine"	Peter Gregson	2:41
2.	"What Happened"	Peter Gregson	2:05
3.	"This Is Your Eden"	Peter Gregson	1:32
4.	"The Task Ahead"	Peter Gregson	1:34
5.	"Walking Out"	Peter Gregson	1:21
6.	"From Paris to the Aquaduct"	Peter Gregson	1:41
7.	"It's a Shrine"	Peter Gregson	1:12
8.	"Travelling to Marly"	Peter Gregson	3:23
9.	"The Sluice Gate"	Peter Gregson	2:55
10.	"Don't Ask Me"	Peter Gregson	3:55
11.	"When You Are Strong Enough"	Peter Gregson	3:00
12.	"Making Love"	Peter Gregson	2:18
13.	"Marie-Claire's Toys"	Peter Gregson	1:10
14.	"The Music Comes from the Heavens"	Peter Gregson	3:24
15.	"A Little Chaos"	Peter Gregson	5:37
16.	"End Roller"	Peter Gregson	3:21
Total length:			41:11

== Distribution ==
=== Promotion ===
BBC Films revealed footage as part of their Sizzle Showreel 2013 on 25 November 2013. First stills of Kate Winslet were released on 22 July 2014 with the announcement of film's premiere at 2014 Toronto International Film Festival. Three images from the film featuring Winslet, Alan Rickman, and Jennifer Ehle were released on 27 August 2014. A scene from the film featuring Winslet and Rickman was revealed on 9 September 2014. The full-length official trailer was revealed on 19 December 2014. The first poster and another trailer were released on 20 January 2015. On 11 June 2015, another scene from the film featuring Stanley Tucci was released.

=== Release ===
The film had its world premiere at the 2014 Toronto International Film Festival as the closing night film on 13 September 2014. It was then shown in gala screenings as Love Gala at the 2014 BFI London Film Festival on 17 October 2014. Rickman presented the film at Camerimage film festival in November 2014. The United States premiere was held at the Sonoma International Film Festival on 25 March 2015. It had a theatrical release in Australia on 26 March 2015 and in UK on 17 April 2015.

It was initially set for a theatrical release on 27 March 2015 in the United States but was later pulled out. Focus Features finally gave the film a simultaneous theatrical and VOD release in United States on 26 June 2015.

== Reception ==
=== Box office ===
As of July 2015, the film had been opened in fourteen territories including Australia and UK and had grossed $10,084,623 worldwide.

=== Critical response ===
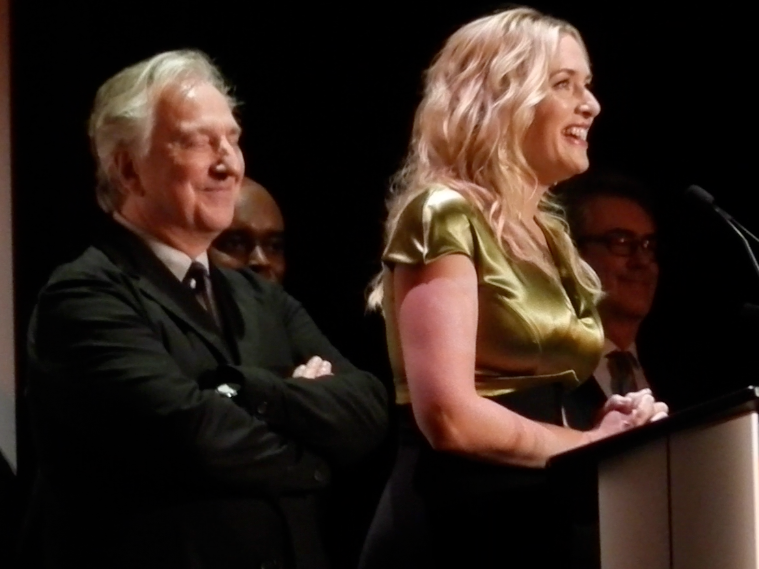
Winslet and Rickman at the screening of the film at the 2014 Toronto International Film Festival.

The film received mixed reviews from critics, with the cast highly praised. As of June 2025, the film holds a 49% approval rating on review aggregator, Rotten Tomatoes, based on 94 reviews. The site's consensus states that "Stylish and well-acted without ever living up to its dramatic potential, A Little Chaos is shouldered by the impressive efforts of a talented cast." At Metacritic, which assigns a weighted mean rating out of 100 to reviews from mainstream critics, the film holds an average score of 51, based on 21 reviews, which indicates "mixed or average reviews".

Catherine Shoard of The Guardian gave the film two out of five stars and wrote that "Winslet manages emotional honesty within anachronistic confines, and Schoenaerts escapes with dignity." Mark Adams in his review for Screen International said, "the film is a gracefully made delight, replete with lush costumes, fruity performances, love amongst the flowerbeds and even a little mild peril. Yes it lacks real dramatic edge and may be seen as a typical British period costume film, but it is also a classily made pleasure that will delight its target audience." David Rooney of The Hollywood Reporter felt that "This decently acted film is agreeable entertainment, even if it works better on a scene by scene basis than in terms of overall flow." Tim Robey in writing for The Telegraph said in his review: "If you see only one film about 17th-century French landscape gardening this year, it probably ought to be A Little Chaos, a heaving bouquet of a picture."

David Sexton of the London Evening Standard gave the film a negative review, saying that "Kate Winslet charms as a gardener at the Court of Louis XIV, but it's not enough to keep this inauthentic piece from wilting." Dennis Harvey of Variety criticised the film, calling it "all too tidy as it imposes a predictable, pat modern sensibility on a most unconvincing depiction of late 17th-century French aristocratic life." Kaleem Aftab of The Independent gave the film two out of five stars, noting that while the performances were exceptional, the talents of the players were wasted. He wrote that "it all starts off so promisingly" and praised the camera work and language, but found it quickly fails as "a melancholic look at grief" where "at least four different genres [clash] against each other, occasionally in the same scene" and "the romance seems to take place off-screen." He concluded: "There was a 17-year gap between Rickman's first and second film and on this evidence it's easy to see why. While he can get performances out of the actors, he lacks command of pacing and plot."
