= Good Madam =

- Film poster
- Xhosa: Mlungu Wam
- Directed by: Jenna Cato Bass
- Written by: Jenna Cato Bass; Babalwa Baartman
- Produced by: Jenna Cato Bass; Babalwa Baartman; Kristina Ceyton; Samantha Jennings
- Starring: Chumisa Cosa; Nosipho Mtebe
- Cinematography: Jenna Cato Bass
- Edited by: Jacques de Villiers
- Music by: Simon Ratcliffe
- Production companies: Causeway Films; Salmira Productions Sanusi Chronicles
- Distributed by: Visit Films
- Release date: 9 September 2021 (TIFF)
- Running time: 92 minutes
- Country: South Africa
- Languages: English; Xhosa

Good Madam (Xhosa: Mlungu Wam) is a South African horror film, directed by Jenna Cato Bass and released in 2021. A commentary on the contemporary state of race relations in South Africa in the years following the end of apartheid, the film stars Chumisa Cosa as Tsidi, a single mother who moves back in with her mother Mavis (Nosipho Mtebe) while her mother is working as a live-in caregiver to an elderly white woman.

The film premiered at the 2021 Toronto International Film Festival, where it received an honorable mention for the Platform Prize.

== Plot ==
Still mourning the loss of her beloved grandmother, single mother Tsidi (Chumisa Cosa) is forced to leave her home in Gugulethu after an irreconcilable feud with her relatives, who have plans for the family house. With nowhere else to stay and her 9-year-old-daughter Winnie (Kamvalethu Jonas Raziya) to care for, Tsidi has no choice but to contact her estranged mother Mavis (Nosipho Mtebe), who has worked as a live-in domestic for the same white ‘Madam’ (Jennifer Boraine) for the past 30 years.

Tsidi blames Mavis for never being around for her or her brother, as she was always obsessively devoted to Madam’s white family. Even now, with Madam bed-ridden and her sons far abroad, Mavis continues to doggedly slave away in the big, empty suburban house. Mavis reluctantly welcomes her daughter and granddaughter; the house brings back uncomfortable childhood memories for Tsidi, who recalls feelings of deep alienation, whereas Winnie is overjoyed with their new space.

Mavis insists that Tsidi and Winnie stay in the cramped maid’s quarters, in spite of the house’s many rooms remaining unused. When Tsidi learns that Madam is not merely bed-ridden but helplessly catatonic, she resolves to make the house a home on her own terms, but soon meets a disturbing, supernatural resistance. She starts to suspect that Madam is not as helpless as she seems and is the cause of this paranormal terror against her. Mavis does not believe her, remaining loyal to Madam and reminding Tsidi of how grateful they should be for Madam’s generosity.

As Tsidi becomes more frightened for her and her daughter’s safety, they receive a surprise visit from Stuart (Sanda Shandu), Mavis’s only son who was adopted by Madam. Stuart descends on the house with his own ideas of what is best for the 'family'. With Tsidi and Mavis's already troubled bond on the brink of destruction, and her relationship with her own daughter deteriorating, Tsidi turns to her grandmother’s spirit to help her uncover the dark truth about Madam’s horrifying heritage.

== Cast ==
- Chumisa Cosa as Tsidi
- Nosipho Mtebe as Mavis
- Kamvalethu Jonas Raziya as Winnie
- Jennifer Borraine as Madam
  - Verity Price as Young Madam
- Sanda Shandu as Stuart
- Khanyiso Kenqa as Luthando
- Sizwe Ginger Lubengu as Siphenathi
- Siva Sikawuti as Toto
- Chris Gxalaba as Malume Mthunzi
- Peggy Tunyiswa as Xoliswa
- Uzile Bam as Xoliswa's Son
- Steve Larter as Grant
- Liza Scholtz as Anna

== Reception ==
On review aggregator Rotten Tomatoes, 84% of 43 critics gave Good Madam a positive review; the website's critical consensus reads: "Even if its ambitions are occasionally unwieldy, Good Madam offers effectively slow-burning horror anchored by thought-provoking themes." On Metacritic, the film has a weighted average score of 59 out of 100 based on 9 critics, which the site labels as "mixed or average" reviews.

Cass Clarke of SlashFilm gave the film a positive review, praising its visuals and calling it "a moving allegory for healing the intergenerational trauma specific to the experience of Black South African women". Conversely, Odie Henderson of RogerEbert.com panned the film, calling it "hideously offensive" and "another exploitation of Black pain for cheap, lazy thrills."
