= Johnny Issaluk =

Inuk actor, athlete, and cultural educator(born 1973)

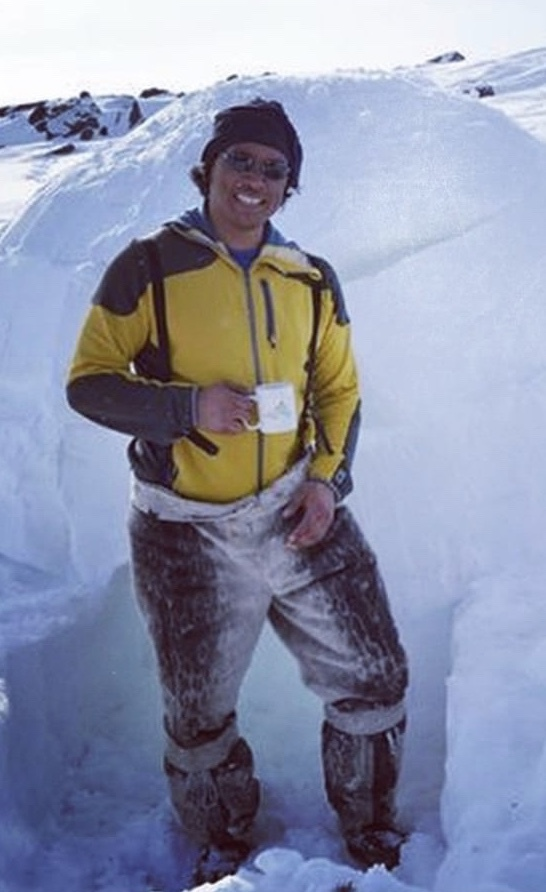

Johnny Nurraq Seotaituq Issaluk (born August 1, 1973) is an Inuk actor, athlete, and cultural educator from Nunavut. He is best known for his roles in AMC's The Terror (produced by Ridley Scott), the film Indian Horse (produced by Clint Eastwood), and in the BBC program The Misadventures of Romesh Ranganathan. In May 2019 he was named Royal Canadian Geographical Society's Explorer-in-Residence.

== Early life ==
He was raised in Igluligaarjuk (Chesterfield Inlet), Nunavut, on the west coast of Hudson Bay.

== Career ==
=== Acting ===
His first acting role was in the short film titled Inuit High Kick which was played at the 2010 Winter Olympics in Vancouver. He later acted as the lead in the film Kajutaijuq: The Spirit That Comes, which debuted at the Toronto International Film Festival in 2014 as one of the first Inuit-made films to screen at a major international film festival. Since then he has appeared in film, television, and in the play The Breathing Hole at the 2017 Stratford Festival, which was the first play at a major festival to cast Inuit actors in Inuit roles. He appeared as Sam in the Clint Eastwood-produced film of the bestselling Richard Wagamese novel Indian Horse, and toured indigenous communities screening the film in 2018.

In 2017 he was cast as the Netsilik Hunter in AMC's The Terror, based on the novel by Dan Simmons; it was hailed as a significant step forward in Inuit representation in film and television.

Most recently he guest starred as himself alongside British comedian Romesh Ranganathan in The Christmas Misadventures of Romesh Ranganathan (originally aired on the BBC on 20 December 2018) in which he visited locations such as Pond Inlet. Travelling "across frozen wastelands to spend a week in the largest territory of Canada, [Ranganathan] is guided by his host - Inuit athlete, movie star, youth ambassador and renowned hunter Johnny Issaluk," where he "witnesses an erosion and resurgence of Inuit traditions." Both the Telegraph and Times gave the episode four of five stars.

He has also played a recurring role on the APTN comedy sketch show Qanurli? as "The Most Interesting Man in Nunavut."

=== Traditional Inuit Games and community work ===
Before becoming an actor he was best known as a successful Traditional Inuit Games athlete, competing regionally and internationally for twenty years and winning over two hundred medals. He stars in the short film Inuit High Kick which was played at the 2010 Winter Olympics in Vancouver, which was also featured at festivals worldwide including the Tromso International Film Festival. He is now retired from competing but visits one hundred schools per year throughout Canada teaching students about Inuit games and culture, and he is the author of the book Traditional Inuit Games for Elementary Students.

He was one of the first sixty Canadians (and the first Nunavummiuq) to receive the Queen's Diamond Jubilee Medal in 2013 for his advocacy of the people of Nunavut. He was a member of the 2012 Arctic Jubilee Expedition that successfully climbed the highest point of the Queen Elizabeth Islands, Nunavut, and sent a video greeting to Queen Elizabeth II. The expedition, sponsored by the Royal Canadian Geographical Society, was followed by schools in the UK and Canada and allowed approximately 17,400 students to learn about Inuit culture.

He has also been an ambassador for the #Canada150 celebrations (including issuing one of the #Next150 national challenges and demonstrating Inuit Traditional Games at the Canadian Parliament) and has been active with many educational programs including Students on Ice and the Sedna Epic Expedition. In 2018 he was inducted as a Fellow of the Royal Canadian Geographical Society for his role in The Terror and his community advocacy, and in 2019 he was named the RCGS's sixth Explorer-in-Residence.

=== Order of Canada and assault allegations ===
In 2019, Issaluk received the Order of Canada. On February 4, 2020, Indspire announced that Issaluk was a winner of one of its 2020 awards. Indspire suspended this award on February 6 after Nunavut filmmaker Alethea Arnaquq-Baril alleged that Issaluk had made an unwanted sexual advance toward her at a party several years ago. On 7 February, Issaluk issued an apology, in a widely distributed open letter. Issaluk's appointment to the Order of Canada was terminated on 31 August 2022.

== Filmography ==
=== Film ===
Year	Film	Role
2018	Falls Around Her	Albert
2017	Indian Horse	Sam
2016	Two Lovers and a Bear	Charlie
2014	Kajutaijuq: The Spirit That Comes	Man
2014	The Orphan and the Polar Bear	Narrator

=== Television ===
Year	Program	Role	Episodes
2018	The Terror	Netsilik Hunter	"Go for Broke" (S1/E1) "The C, the C, the Open C" (S1/E9) "We Are Gone" (S1/E10)
2016	Murdoch Mysteries	Nuniq	"The Big Chill" (S9/E10)
2018	The Christmas Misadventures of Romesh Ranganathan	Himself	"The Arctic" (S1/E4)

== Theatre ==
Year	Production	Role	Company
2017	The Breathing Hole	Nukilik/Totalik	Stratford Theatre Company/Stratford Festival
