= The Valley (2014 film) =

2014 film

- Film poster
- Directed by: Ghassan Salhab
- Written by: Ghassan Salhab
- Starring: Carol Abboud
- Release date: 4 September 2014 (TIFF)
- Running time: 135 minutes
- Country: Lebanon
- Language: Arabic

The Valley (Arabic: الوادي; al-wadi) is a 2014 Lebanese drama film written and directed by Ghassan Salhab. It was selected to be screened in the Contemporary World Cinema section at the 2014 Toronto International Film Festival and received its world premiere on 4 September 2014.

== Cast ==
- Carol Abboud as Carole
- Fadi Abi Samra as Marwan
- Aouni Kawas as Hikmat
- Carlos Chahine as Accident Man
- Rodrigue Sleiman as Armed Man
- Ahmad Ghossein as Armed Man
- Mounzer Baalbaki as Ali
- Yumna Marwan as Maria
