= Lionsgate UK =

Film production company

Lions Gate UK Limited
- Logo used since 2006
- Formerly: Ibis (594) Limited (August 2000–September 2000); Quantum Entertainment Limited (September 2000–March 2001); Redbus Film Distribution Limited (March–June 2001; June 2003–February 2006); Helkon SK Film Distribution Limited (June 2001–June 2003)
- Type: Division
- Industry: Film
- Predecessor: Redbus Film Distribution; Entertainment One UK (theatrical distribution)
- Founded: 1997; 29 years ago (as Redbus Film Distribution)
- Founders: Simon Franks; Zygi Kamasa
- Headquarters: London, England
- Services: Film
- Parent: Lionsgate Films (2005–present)
- Subsidiaries: Elevation Sales (joint venture with StudioCanal UK); Primal Media; Potboiler Television (joint venture with Potboiler Productions)
- Website: lionsgatefilms.co.uk

Lions Gate UK Limited (formerly Redbus Film Distribution, and briefly known as Helkon SK between 2001 and 2003) is a British film and television distribution subsidiary and the British branch of the Canadian/American film company, Lionsgate Studios.

Founded in 1999 by Simon Franks and Zygi Kamasa, Redbus has distributed and produced many films for the United Kingdom; such as Bend It Like Beckham, What's Cooking?, Cabin Fever, Jeepers Creepers, It's All Gone Pete Tong, and Good Night, and Good Luck. Redbus' first theatrical film to be released was The Tichborne Claimant in 1999.

In October 2005, Lionsgate acquired Redbus and rebranded it under its current name. Its home media company, Redbus Home Entertainment, would also rebrand as Lionsgate Home Entertainment UK. Redbus's film releases were formerly distributed on home video by Warner Home Video until 2006.

== History ==
Redbus Film Distribution was formed in 1999. According to an investment prospectus filed in March 1999, it was funded to the tune of £250,000, and took its name from Cliff Stanford's Redbus Group SA.

The prospectus stated that its goals were to co-produce and distribute 10-12 full length feature films annually to the cinema, video and television markets in the UK.

On 14 March 2000, Redbus made a deal with German media company Helkon Media AG to acquire film rights for both of the companies' respective regions. Helkon would later purchase a majority stake in the company in October of the same year. However, their failure to pay one-half of the first $16 million (£11,954,176.00) installation would lead to Stanford suing the company. Helkon would quickly pay the other half, leading to the lawsuit being dropped and their final acquisition of Redbus. Following this, Redbus changed its name to Helkon SK, to reflect their partnership with Helkon Media.

On 4 August 2002, Helkon Media filed for insolvency, leading to Franks and Kamasa buying back full ownership of the company. The company officially rebranded back to Redbus on 6 May 2003, and was also restructured, with Franks running the core distribution company and Kamasa in charge of a new production arm. All of Helkon's ownership was finally absolved in February 2005.

On 17 October 2005, Lionsgate acquired Redbus Film Distribution for $35 million. and became Lionsgate UK on 23 February 2006.

== Films ==
See Lists of Lionsgate films for films the company released in the U.S. as well.

=== 1999 ===
- The Tichborne Claimant
- The Rage: Carrie 2

=== 2000s ===
==== 2000 ====
- Strange Planet
- Open Your Eyes
- One Day in September
- Things You Can Tell Just by Looking at Her
- Maybe Baby
- Play It to the Bone
- Gun Shy
- Dead Babies
- Buddy Boy
- Nasty Neighbours

==== 2001 ====
- Under Suspicion
- State and Main
- The Gift (2000)
- What's Cooking?
- Jeepers Creepers

==== 2002 ====
- Repli-Kate
- The Mothman Prophecies
- Sidewalks of New York
- Bend It Like Beckham
- A Walk to Remember
- Bollywood Queen
- Steal
- Live Forever

==== 2003 ====
- Spider
- Stark Raving Mad
- Live Forever: The Rise and Fall of Brit Pop
- Girl from Rio
- Welcome to Collinwood
- The Hunted
- White Oleander
- Steal
- Bollywood Queen
- Cabin Fever
- Contra todos

==== 2004 ====
- Ash Wednesday
- Grand Theft Parsons
- Monsieur N.
- Emile
- Open Water
- The Big Kahuna
- House of the Dead
- Touch of Pink
- Levity
- Man About Dog
- School for Seduction
- Tooth

==== 2005 ====
- It's All Gone Pete Tong
- We Don't Live Here Anymore
- Walk on Water
- Noel
- Revolver
- Rize
- Zemanovaload
- The Best Man
- Oyster Farmer

==== 2006 ====
- A Cock and Bull Story
- Good Night, and Good Luck
- Ushpizin
- Diameter of the Bomb
- Pierrepoint
- An American Haunting
- Enron: The Smartest Guys in the Room
- Wah-Wah
- 11:14
- Paper Clips
- The Wicker Man
- Gypo
- Snuff-Movie
- 12 and Holding
- The Rocket Post
- The Princess Bride (re-release)

==== 2007 ====
- Like Minds
- The Lives of Others
- The All Together
- Paradise Lost
- In the Hands of the Gods
- As You Like It
- Earth
- Lila Says
- National Lampoon's Pledge This!
- Dirty Dancing (20th anniversary re-release)

==== 2008 ====
- Children of Glory
- Lonesome Jim
- The Edge of Love
- The Waiting Room
- Death Defying Acts
- Angel
- Righteous Kill
- I've Loved You So Long
- The Lost City
- Passengers
- Hamburger Hill (DVD reissue)

==== 2009 ====
- Two Lovers
- Good
- Frequently Asked Questions About Time Travel
- Drag Me to Hell
- The Hurt Locker
- The Imaginarium of Doctor Parnassus
- Harry Brown
- S. Darko
- Thick as Thieves
- Blonde Ambition

=== 2010s ===
==== 2010 ====
- As Good as Dead
- Whip It
- Heartless
- Shrink
- The Switch
- Giallo
- Stone
- Psychosis
- The Blair Witch Project (DVD reissue)
- Halloween II (DVD reissue)

==== 2011 ====
- Before Night Falls (DVD reissue)
- The Mechanic
- Little White Lies
- Blitz
- Screwed
- Trust
- Drive Angry
- Trespass
- 50/50
- Machine Gun Preacher
- Self Medicated
- Hell
- Jack Falls
- The Holding
- Monster Mutt
- Hesher
- Flypaper
- Pulp Fiction (DVD reissue)
- Jackie Brown (DVD reissue)

==== 2012 ====
- The Son of No One
- Coriolanus
- A Dangerous Method
- Salmon Fishing in the Yemen
- How I Spent My Summer Vacation
- Magic Mike
- Keith Lemon: The Film
- Tower Block
- On the Road
- Silent Hill: Revelation
- Great Expectations
- Reservoir Dogs (re-release)
- The Curse of Frankenstein (Blu-ray reissue)
- Wishmaster (Blu-ray reissue)

==== 2013 ====
- Playing for Keeps
- The Paperboy
- Stolen
- Olympus Has Fallen
- Rebellion
- The Moth Diaries
- The Iceman
- Pororo, The Racing Adventure
- Trap for Cinderella
- Easy Money
- Lovelace
- Only God Forgives
- Bachelorette
- Filth
- Machete Kills
- Dom Hemingway
- Jeune et Jolie
- Reign of Assassins
- Killing Season
- Homefront
- ATM
- The Princess Bride (re-release)

==== 2014 ====
- The Railway Man
- Out of the Furnace
- The Invisible Woman
- A Long Way Down
- Locke
- Sin City: A Dame to Kill For
- A Little Chaos
- Sabotage
- Postman Pat: The Movie
- Chef
- Love, Rosie
- The Rewrite
- What We Did on Our Holiday
- Horns
- I Am Soldier
- As I Lay Dying

==== 2015 ====
- Testament of Youth
- Stonehearst Asylum
- Moomins on the Riviera
- Survivor
- Slow West
- The Gift (2015)
- Absolutely Anything
- Brooklyn
- Good People
- Autómata
- Bound (Blu-ray reissue)
- Kickboxer (Blu-ray reissue)
- The Limey (Blu-ray reissue)
- Requiem for a Dream (Blu-ray reissue)

==== 2016 ====
- Pride and Prejudice and Zombies
- Eddie the Eagle
- Jane Got a Gun
- Sing Street
- Minuscule: Valley of the Lost Ants
- Mother's Day
- London Has Fallen
- Nine Lives
- Brotherhood
- Molly Moon and the Incredible Book of Hypnotism
- The Pass
- Ratchet & Clank
- USS Indianapolis: Men of Courage
- Viral
- Love & Friendship
- The Curse of Sleeping Beauty
- The Guv'nor
- The Lobster (home video distribution only)

==== 2017 ====
- The Fits
- Fallen
- Trespass Against Us
- The Autopsy of Jane Doe
- Their Finest
- The Last Face
- My Name Is Lenny
- Churchill
- Valerian and the City of a Thousand Planets
- The Limehouse Golem
- Maze
- Only the Brave
- The Man with the Iron Heart
- Film Stars Don't Die in Liverpool
- The Bleeder
- 24 Hours to Live
- Blood Diner (Blu-ray reissue)
- C.H.U.D. II: Bud the C.H.U.D. (Blu-ray reissue)
- The Gate (Blu-ray reissue)
- The Lair of the White Worm (Blu-ray reissue)
- Return of the Living Dead III (Blu-ray reissue)
- Waxwork (Blu-ray reissue)
- Elle (home video distribution only)
- Swiss Army Man (home video distribution only)
- The Princess Bride (30th anniversary re-release)

==== 2018 ====
- My Generation
- 12 Strong
- Journey's End
- Ghost Stories
- On Chesil Beach
- Early Man
- Gotti
- McQueen
- The Happy Prince
- Sicario 2: Soldado
- Submergence
- The Institute
- God's Own Country (home video distribution only)
- The Party (home video distribution only)
- Class of 1999 (Blu-ray reissue)
- Halloween (Blu-ray reissue)
- Parents (Blu-ray reissue)
- Tucker: The Man and His Dream (Blu-ray reissue)
- The Unholy (Blu-ray reissue)

==== 2019 ====
- Colette
- Destroyer
- The Vanishing
- Fighting with My Family
- Missing Link
- Red Joan
- The Queen's Corgi
- Teen Spirit
- Skin
- Farming
- Snowpiercer (Blu-ray reissue)

=== 2020s ===
==== 2020 ====
- The Personal History of David Copperfield
- Military Wives
- Ride Like a Girl
- How to Build a Girl
- Summerland
- The Outpost
- A Gift from Bob
- The Legionnaire's Trail
- Blackbird
- Tesla
- Khali the Killer
- 2:22
- Candyman 3: Day of the Dead (Blu-ray reissue)
- Last Exit to Brooklyn (Blu-ray reissue)
- Little Monsters (Blu-ray reissue)

==== 2021 ====
- Six Minutes to Midnight
- Made in Italy
- Wild Mountain Thyme
- Wrath of Man
- Ammonite
- The Father
- Mothering Sunday
- Till Death
- Dementia 13 (Blu-ray reissue)
- Sundown: The Vampire in Retreat (Blu-ray reissue)
- Traffic (Blu-ray reissue)
- The Wraith (Blu-ray reissue)
- Dune (re-release)
- Ghost in the Shell (re-release)

==== 2022 ====
- Living
- Good Luck to You, Leo Grande
- Triangle of Sadness
- Dream a Little Dream (Blu-ray reissue)

==== 2023 ====
- The Miracle Club
- Anatomy of a Fall
- The Pod Generation
- The King's Daughter
- Gangs of New York (re-release)

==== 2024 ====
- The Iron Claw
- Love Lies Bleeding
- The Critic
- The Last Voyage of the Demeter

==== 2025 ====
- The Seed of the Sacred Fig
- The Penguin Lessons
- Tornado

==== 2026 ====
- H is for Hawk
- Wasteman
- Glenrothan
- The Furious

==== 2027 ====
- The Debut

=== TBA ===
- The Entertainment System Is Down
