= Kajutaijuq: The Spirit That Comes =

2014 Canadian short film

- Directed by: Scott Brachmayer
- Written by: Scott Brachmayer; Nyla Innuksuk; Craig Stewart
- Produced by: Ellen Hamilton; Nyla Innuksuk
- Starring: Johnny Issaluk
- Cinematography: Ann Tipper
- Edited by: Scott Brachmayer; Craig Stewart
- Music by: Chris Coleman
- Production company: North Creative
- Release date: September 8, 2014 (TIFF)
- Running time: 15 minutes
- Country: Canada
- Language: Inuktitut

Kajutaijuq: The Spirit That Comes is a Canadian short film, directed by Scott Brachmayer and released in 2014. The film stars Johnny Issaluk as an Inuk man who is threatened when he encounters a malevolent spirit while hunting.

The film was named to TIFF's annual year-end Canada's Top Ten list for 2014.

Principal photography lasted five days in March 2014, and was filmed 30 minutes from Iqaluit.
