= Venice (film) =

2014 film

- Film poster
- Spanish: Venecia
- Directed by: Kiki Álvarez
- Written by: Claudia Muñiz
- Starring: Claudia Muñiz
- Cinematography: Nicolas Ordoñez
- Release date: 7 September 2014 (TIFF)
- Running time: 74 minutes
- Country: Cuba
- Language: Spanish

Venice (Spanish: Venecia) is a 2014 Cuban drama film directed by Kiki Álvarez. It was screened in the Contemporary World Cinema section at the 2014 Toronto International Film Festival.

== Cast ==
- Claudia Muñiz as Violeta
- Jazz Vilá as Ada-Adalberto
- Maribel Garcia Garzón as Mónica
- Marianela Pupo as Mayelín
