= Chiedza Mhende =

Zimbabwean actress

Chi Mhende
- Born: Charlene Chiedza Kudzai Mhende; 19 October 1991 (age 34); Harare, Zimbabwe
- Other name: Chi
- Education: AFDA Cape Town
- Occupations: Actress, voice artist
- Years active: 2009–present
- Height: 1.76 m (5 ft 9 in)

Charlene Chiedza 'Chi' Kudzai Mhende (born 19 October 1991), is a Zimbabwean actress, director and voice over artist. She is best known for shocking audiences with her convincing male portrayal of 'Wandile Radebe' on the South African soap opera Generations.

== Personal life ==
Mhende was born on 19 October 1991 in Harare, Zimbabwe.

== Career ==
In 2015, she joined the South African soap opera Generations where she played the role 'Wandile Radebe', a male role. The show became a hit and continued to 4 seasons including 1000 episodes.

In 2006, Mhende moved to Cape Town to study at The School for the Creative Economy. She started theater acting with the role 'Lady Capulet' in an Artscape production Romeo and Juliet. With the brilliant performance in it, she was selected for many theater plays such as K. Sello Duiker's The Quiet Violence of Dreams, JM Coetzee's Waiting for the Barbarians, A Midsummer Night's Dream, Taming of the Shrew, The Comedy of Errors, and Richard III. She made the appearance in Generations:The Legacy where she played a male role. In 2008 she won the award for the Best Actress at AFDA awards.

She later worked with organisations such as the 'Bonfire Improv Theatre Company' and the 'Zakheni Arts Therapy Foundation' and contribute to the drama in South Africa. She is also renowned as the voice of 'Siyaya' and Al Jazeera's global health series 'Lifelines'. In 2014, Mhende made her maiden cinema appearance with the film Love the One You Love. The film had its premier at the 2014 Durban International Film Festival where she has played the role 'Sandile' where she became the Best Actress. In 2015, she was nominated for Promising Young Artist award at Africa Movie Academy Awards.

== Filmography ==
| Year | Film | Role | Genre | Ref. |
|---|---|---|---|---|
| 2010 | The Tunnel | Monica | Short film | |
| 2014 | Love the One You Love | Terri | Film | |
| 2014 | Bridging Waters | Narrator | TV Mini–Series documentary | |
| 2014 | Homeland | Aide | TV series | |
| 2014 | Scribblings | Viva | Short film | |
| 2015 | Generations | Wandile Radebe | TV series | |
| 2015 | Siyaya: Come Wild with Us | Narrator | TV series documentary | |
| 2015 | Lazy Susan | Susan | Short film | |
| 2015 | Jamillah and Aladdin | Physician | TV series | |
| 2016 | Detour | Hospital Receptionist | TV series | |
| 2020 | Queen Sono | Miri Dube | TV series | |
| 2026 | One Piece | Miss Monday | TV Series (Season 2) | |
