= The Great Man (2014 film) =

- Film poster
- Le Grand Homme
- Directed by: Sarah Leonor
- Written by: Emmanuelle Jacob; Sarah Leonor
- Produced by: Michel Klein
- Starring: Jérémie Renier; Surho Sugaipov; Ramzan Idiev
- Cinematography: Laurent Desmet
- Edited by: François Quiqueré
- Music by: Martin Wheeler
- Production companies: Les Films Hatari; Le Studio Orlando
- Distributed by: BAC Films
- Release date: 13 August 2014
- Running time: 107 minutes
- Country: France
- Language: French

The Great Man (Le Grand Homme) is a 2014 French drama film co-written and directed by Sarah Leonor. It was screened in the Discovery section at the 2014 Toronto International Film Festival.

== Cast ==
- Jérémie Renier as Hamilton / Michaël Hernandez
- Surho Sugaipov as Markov / Mourad Massaev
- Ramzan Idiev as Khadji
- Daniel Fassi as Gradé Afghanistan
- Jean-Yves Ruf as Colonel Lacour
- Sabine Massé as Sabina
- Miglen Mirtchev as Johnson
- Paul Massé as Magomed
- Laura Arsangereeva as Madina
- Issita Arslanov as Issita
- Michaël Klein as Directeur d'école
- Daphné Dumons as Camille
- Manon Gineste as Maëva
- Sava Lolov as Dr. Arnold
- Guillaume Verdier as Sergent-chef Gao
