= Slater Jewell-Kemker =

American-Canadian climate activist (born 1992)

Slater Jewell-Kemker (born 1992) is an American-Canadian filmmaker and climate activist. She was born in Los Angeles, California, and has been making films since six years old. Jewell-Kemker first became interested in climate change at age 13. When she was 15 years old, she began production on An Inconvenient Youth (2012), chronicling the rise of the global youth climate movement. The same topic was portrayed in her film Youth Unstoppable (2018), which Jewell-Kemker worked on for 12 years.

In 2013, she completed a program at the Canadian Film Centre, elaborating the short film Alice (2013). Her 2014 short film Still was named to the Toronto International Film Festival's annual year-end Canada's Top Ten list for 2014.

== Youth Unstoppable ==
Youth Unstoppable is a 2018 Canadian documentary film, directed by Slater Jewell-Kemker, that portrays the rise of the global youth climate movement.

Jewell-Kemker traveled around the world as a climate activist since she was 14 years old, and captured the voices of young people concerned about climate change. The film follows the growth of the environmentalist network over 12 years.
