= Zygi Kamasa =

Swedish-British entertainment studio executive and film executive producer

- Born: Zygmunt Jan Kamasa; 12 November 1969 (age 56)
- Occupations: Founder and CEO of True Brit Entertainment

Zygmunt Jan "Zygi" Kamasa (born 12 November 1969) is a Swedish-British entertainment studio executive and film executive producer.

He is the CEO and founder of True Brit Entertainment, a British based theatrical distributor dedicated exclusively to co-financing and co-producing British feature films and Television.

Previously, Kamasa was group CEO of MARV, partnering with director and producer Matthew Vaughn, where he oversaw the expansion of the Kingsman franchise and produced the film Tetris (2023), starring Taron Egerton, as well as Vaughn's latest big budget film, Argylle (2024), starring Henry Cavill, Sam Rockwell, Bryce Dallas Howard, Samuel L Jackson, and John Cena, due to be released through Universal Pictures and Apple TV+ in 2024.

Kamasa was CEO of Lionsgate UK & Europe until July 2020 where he was a major supporter of British independent films, investing and releasing over 60 British films, as well as producing films such as Harry Brown (2009), Salmon Fishing in the Yemen (2011), The Railway Man (2013), Brooklyn (2015), Eddie the Eagle (2015), and London Has Fallen (2016).

== Career ==
Kamasa was educated at Highgate School until 1987 and started his film career in 1993 as Founder and Managing Director of TV production company Scorpio Productions, based at Pinewood Studios. In 1998, he co-founded with Simon Franks, the independent film distribution company Redbus Film, producing and distributing films in the UK including Bend It Like Beckham (2002) and Good Night, and Good Luck (2005).

In October 2005, Redbus Film was sold to Lionsgate Entertainment for $35 million and became Lionsgate UK in February 2006.

As CEO of Lionsgate UK & Europe, Kamasa oversaw the investment, production and distribution of UK top ten box office films including three instalments of The Hunger Games franchise, The Expendables and its sequels, Kathryn Bigelow’s Oscar-winning The Hurt Locker (2008), and action films Olympus Has Fallen (2013) and its sequel London Has Fallen (2016). He also led UK distribution for Deepwater Horizon (2016) and La La Land (2016).

Kamasa's credits as executive producer of UK films include Salmon Fishing in the Yemen (2011), starring Ewan McGregor and Emily Blunt, The Railway Man (2013), starring Colin Firth and Nicole Kidman, A Little Chaos (2014), starring Kate Winslet and Alan Rickman, Eddie the Eagle (2015), starring Taron Egerton and Hugh Jackman, and Brooklyn (2015), starring Saoirse Ronan.

Kamasa has had a long history of backing British independent feature films, having been executive producer on over 40 British titles.

In 2023, his latest business venture is True Brit Entertainment, a British based theatrical distributor, dedicated exclusively to co-financing and co-producing British feature films and Television.
