= Jenna Bass =

British-South African film director (born 1986)

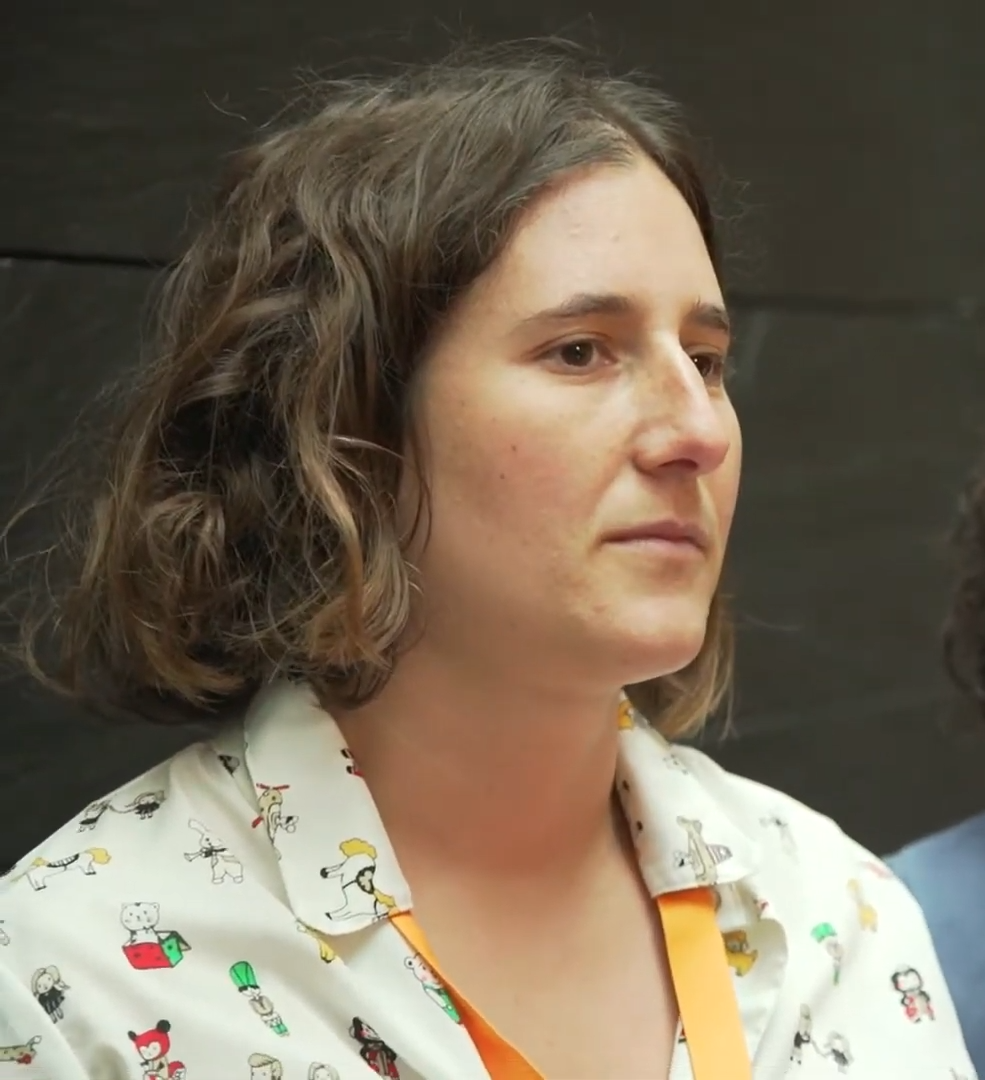
- Bass in 2018
- Born: Jenna Cato Bass; 1986 (age 39–40); London, England
- Education: AFDA
- Occupations: Film director; screenwriter; writer
- Years active: 2010–present

Jenna Cato Bass (born 1986) is a British-born South African film director, screenwriter, and author. She has written short stories under the pseudonym Constance Myburgh, one of which was shortlisted for the 2012 Caine Prize for African Writing.

== Early life and education ==
Jenna Cato Bass was born in 1986 London, England, and grew up in South Africa.

She practised magic at the College of Magic. She went on to graduate from the Cape Town campus of AFDA, The School for the Creative Economy.

== Career ==
=== Writing ===
In 2011 Bass founded Jungle Jim, a genre fiction magazine. Bass first started using a pseudonym, Constance Myburgh, in 2011, to keep her author profile separate from her role as a screenwriter in the film industry.

Issue 6 featured her noir detective story 'Hunter Emmanuel', featuring an investigation into a dismembered prostitute. The story was shortlisted for the Caine Prize for African Writing in 2012.

=== Filmmaking ===
Bass's first feature film, Love the One You Love (2014), was shot on a "nano-budget" using hand-held consumer cameras and a partly improvised script. The film told the story of a sex phone operator negotiating her relationship with her boyfriend and considering a move to Korea. The film won Best South African Feature Film at the 2014 Durban International Film Festival.

High Fantasy (2017) is a satirical thriller about a group of young travellers who mysteriously exchange their bodies on a camping trip. Shot on iPhones, using improvisation, the film explores "the messy tangle of race, class and gender identity in modern-day South Africa."

Flatland (2019), a woman led "South African kitsch-western genre mashup", was shot on a larger budget. Natalie and Poppie flee their rural town on horseback after Natalie murders the local pastor on her wedding night. Detective Beauty Cuba is determined not to let them get away. It was chosen as the opening film in the 2019 Berlinale Panorama.

Mlungu Wam (Good Madam) (2021) is a horror-psychological thriller set in the upper-class, suburban and mostly white suburb of Constantia, Cape Town.

Future Tense is a speculative fiction/thriller film involving time travel that examines the effects of colonialism in South Africa, with three narrative strands, starring Lawrence Maleka and Kristen Raath. A co-production of South Africa and Australia, the film was written and directed by Bass and produced by Kristina Ceyton, Samantha Jennings, and Hisham Samie. Future Tense had its world premiere at the Toronto International Film Festival in September 2026 and is set to screen at the Adelaide Film Festival on 16 October 2026. It has been generally well-reviewed.

== Publications ==
=== Short stories ===
- "A Hole in the Ground" (Jungle Jim , vol. 2)
- "Hunter Emmanuel" (Jungle Jim, vol. 6), which was shortlisted for the Caine Prize for African Writing in 2012

== Filmography ==
| Year | Title | Director | Writer | Producer | Cinematographer | Other | Notes |
|---|---|---|---|---|---|---|---|
| 2010 | The Tunnel | Yes | Yes | Yes | | | Part of Africa First: Volume One |
| 2014 | Love the One You Love | Yes | Yes | Yes | Yes | Editor, production designer | |
| 2017 | High Fantasy | Yes | Yes | Yes | Yes | | |
| 2018 | Rafiki | | Yes | | | | |
| 2019 | Sizohlala | Yes | Yes | | | | Short film |
| 2019 | Flatland | Yes | Yes | | | | |
| 2019 | Neighbours | Yes | | | | | |
| 2021 | Good Madam | Yes | Yes | Yes | Yes | Production designer, Casting | |
| 2021 | Tug of War | | Yes | | | | |
| 2026 | Future Tense | Yes | Yes | | | | |
