= Nino Kirtadze =

Georgian journalist, filmmaker and actress (born 1968)

- Born: June 1, 1968; Tbilisi, Georgian SSR, USSR
- Education: Tbilisi State University
- Occupations: journalist, actress, film director

Nino Kirtadze (Georgian: ნინო კირთაძე; born 1 June 1968) is a Georgian-born French journalist, actress and film director. Since 1997 she has lived in France.

She starred in the 1996 film A Chef in Love as well as the 2008 film The Rainbowmaker. She directed the 2014 film Don't Breathe.
