= Behind the Rainbow =

- Directed by: Jihan El-Tahri
- Screenplay by: Jihan El Tahri
- Produced by: Big World Cinema, Big Sister Production
- Cinematography: Frank Lehmann
- Edited by: Gilles Bovon
- Music by: Ntjapedi
- Release date: 2009
- Running time: 138 minutes
- Countries: Egypt; France; South Africa

Behind the Rainbow is a 2009 documentary film.

== Synopsis ==
Behind the Rainbow explores the transition of the African National Congress (ANC) from its role as a liberation organization to its position as South Africa's ruling party, by means of the evolution of the relationship between two of its prominent leaders, Thabo Mbeki and Jacob Zuma. Exiled under Apartheid, brothers in arms following Mandela's leadership, they loyally labored to build a non-racial state. Now they are bitter rivals. Their confrontation threatens to tear apart the ANC and the country, meanwhile the poor desperately seek hope in change and the elite fight for the spoils of victory.

== Awards ==
- Fespaco 2009
