= High Fantasy (film) =

2017 film

- Film poster
- Directed by: Jenna Bass
- Written by: Jenna Bass Qondiswa James Nala Khumalo
- Starring: Qondiswa James
- Cinematography: Jenna Bass
- Edited by: Kyle Wallace
- Music by: Simon Ratcliffe
- Production company: Big World Cinema
- Release date: 8 September 2017 (TIFF)
- Running time: 96 Minutes
- Country: South Africa
- Language: Afrikaans

High Fantasy is a 2017 South African comedy film directed by Jenna Bass. It was screened in the Discovery section at the 2017 Toronto International Film Festival.

== Plot ==
A group of young friends on a camping trip, deep in the South African countryside wake up to discover they have all swapped bodies. Their individual cultural heritage and experience of these strange happenings couldn't be more different; and stranded in the wilderness, they will have to navigate a personal-political labyrinth if their friendship and their lives are ever to be the same again.

== Cast ==
- Qondiswa James as Xoli
- Nala Khumalo as Thami
- Francesca Varrie Michel as Lexi
- Liza Scholtz as Tatiana

== Reception ==
On review aggregator website Rotten Tomatoes, the film holds an approval rating of 75% based on 12 reviews, and an average rating of 5.5/10.
