= Lucy McNulty =

Canadian filmmaker and actress

- Born: Canada
- Occupations: Film producer, director, screenwriter, actress
- Years active: 2017–present

Lucy McNulty is a Canadian film producer, director, writer, and actor based in Vancouver, British Columbia. She is known for producing the found-footage horror feature Hunting Matthew Nichols (2024), the short film How Brief (2026), which premiered at the Sundance Film Festival, and the psychological horror feature Devour. She wrote, co-directed, produced, and starred in the short film Chicken (2023), which received several international film festival awards.

== Life and career ==
McNulty graduated from Studio 58 at Langara College in Vancouver and attended the Canadian Film Centre's Norman Jewison Producers' Lab in 2024. She is also an alumna of the GEMS Genre Film Lab and TIFF Series Accelerator.

McNulty began her career in theatre, appearing in productions at the PuSh Festival, the National Arts Centre, and the Banff Centre for Arts and Creativity. Her theatre work includes King Arthur's Night and Bunny. In 2018, she received a Jessie Richardson Theatre Award for Outstanding Performance by an Ensemble for King Arthur's Night. She is also a recipient of the Sydney J. Risk Foundation Acting Award. She co-wrote the book for the musical Cowboy Tempest Cabaret, commissioned by The Musical Stage Company.

In 2023, McNulty co-directed, wrote, produced, and appeared in the short film Chicken with Emma Pollard. The film follows a woman who returns to her family home and reconnects with her brother, who has Down syndrome. It received the Jury's Choice and Diversity, Equity, Access and Inclusion awards at the Thomas Edison Film Festival, along with other festival awards.

McNulty produced the found-footage horror feature Hunting Matthew Nichols (2024), directed by Markian Tarasiuk. The film screened at the Whistler Film Festival, FilmQuest, and other genre film festivals. It later received a theatrical release and became available on streaming platforms.

In 2026, McNulty produced the short film How Brief, directed by Kelly McCormack and written by Tess Degenstein. The film stars Degenstein, Tatiana Maslany, and Gray Powell. It premiered at the 2026 Sundance Film Festival. The same year, she co-directed and produced the short film Bare with Miranda MacDougall. The film was selected for Telefilm Canada's Not Short on Talent showcase at the Cannes Film Festival.

McNulty is producing the psychological body-horror feature Devour, directed by Erica Orofino and starring Tricia Helfer. The film is produced by Wildling Pictures and completed principal photography in October 2026.

McNulty founded Strange Company Productions and co-founded DropShock Pictures, which produced Hunting Matthew Nichols. She is developing the feature film Deepfake, a psychological thriller written by Ariel Bond and directed by Miranda MacDougall. The project participated in the GEMS Genre Film Lab, the 2025 Frontières International Co-Production Market, and the Filmable x Collective Bunch Fellowship. She also received the 2025 GEMS x Whistler Film Festival Market Preparation Mentorship for the project.

McNulty is attached to produce the upcoming feature film Pickups, written and directed by Andy Reid.

== Selected filmography ==
Year	Title	Contribution	Note
2023	Chicken	Co-director, writer and producer	Short film
2024	Hunting Matthew Nichols	Producer	Feature film
2025	At The End	Writer, producer and actor	Short film
2026	How Brief	Producer	Short film
2026	Bare	Co-director and producer	Short film
TBA	Devour	Producer	Feature film

== Awards and nominations ==
Year	Result	Award	Category	Work	Ref.
2023–2024	Won	Thomas Edison Film Festival	DEAI Award	Chicken	
2023–2024	Won	Thomas Edison Film Festival	Juror's Choice	Chicken	
2023–2024	Won	Canada Shorts	Award of Distinction	Chicken	
2023–2024	Won	Big Syn Film Fest	Best International Short	Chicken	
2023–2024	Won	Freedom Festival International	Best Disability Short	Chicken	
2023–2024	Won	Wildsound Film Festival	Best Direction	Chicken	
2023–2024	Won	Women’s Comedy Film Festival in Atlanta	Best Film	Chicken	
2023–2024	Won	Diversity Film Festival	Best Short Film	Chicken	
2023–2024	Won	Bridges International Film Festival	Best “We Can Do” Short Film	Chicken	
2023–2024	Nominated	Leo Awards	Best Screenwriting in a Short Drama	Chicken	
2023–2024	Nominated	Leo Awards	Best Performance by a Female in a Short Drama	Chicken	
2023–2024	Nominated	Portland Comedy Film Fest	Best International Film	Chicken	
2023–2024	Nominated	Little Venice Film Festival	Disability Experience Award	Chicken	
2023–2024	Nominated	Atlanta Women’s Film Festival	Best Ensemble Cast	Chicken	
2023–2024	Nominated	Champion Film Salon	Best Short	Chicken	
2023–2024	Nominated	Screen It International Film Festival	Best Director	Chicken	
2023–2024	Nominated	Screen It International Film Festival	Best Screenplay	Chicken	
2023–2024	Nominated	Screen It International Film Festival	Best Actor	Chicken	
2023–2024	Nominated	Georgia Shorts Film Festival	Best Dark Comedy Film	Chicken	
2023–2024	Nominated	Georgia Shorts Film Festival	Best Director	Chicken	
2023–2024	Nominated	Vancouver Island Short Film Festival	Best of BC	Chicken	
2023–2024	Nominated	Women’s Comedy Film Festival in Atlanta	Best Direction	Chicken	
2023–2024	Nominated	Women’s Comedy Film Festival in Atlanta	Best International Short	Chicken	
2023–2024	Nominated	Gender Equity in Media Festival	Best BC Short	Chicken	
2023–2024	Nominated	Oska Bright Film Festival	Best Story	Chicken	
2023–2024	Nominated	Leuven DisABILITY Film Festival	Best International Short	Chicken	
2023–2024	Nominated	Chilliwack Independent Film Festival	Field House Award: Crafting Goodness in the Valley	Chicken	
2023–2024	Nominated	Art Without Limit International Film Festival	Art Without Limit Award	Chicken	
2024	Won	FilmQuest	Best Found Footage Feature	Hunting Matthew Nichols	
2024	Nominated	Nightmares Film Festival	Best Thriller Feature	Hunting Matthew Nichols	
2024	Nominated	Whistler Film Festival	Best Canadian Feature	Hunting Matthew Nichols	
2024	Nominated	Blood in the Snow Canadian Film Festival	Best Feature Film	Hunting Matthew Nichols	
2024	Nominated	Feel the Reel International Film Festival	Best Actress	After All This Time	
2024	Won	Austin International Art Festival	Best Female Filmmaker	Ábreme	
2026	Nominated	Leo Awards	Best Short Drama	At the End	
2026	Nominated	Leo Awards	Best Screenwriting in a Short Drama	At the End	
2026	Nominated	UBCP/ACTRA Awards	Best short performance	At the End	
2026	Nominated	Sundance Film Festival	Short Film Grand Jury Prize	How Brief	
