= Influencer (film) =

2022 film by Kurtis David Harder

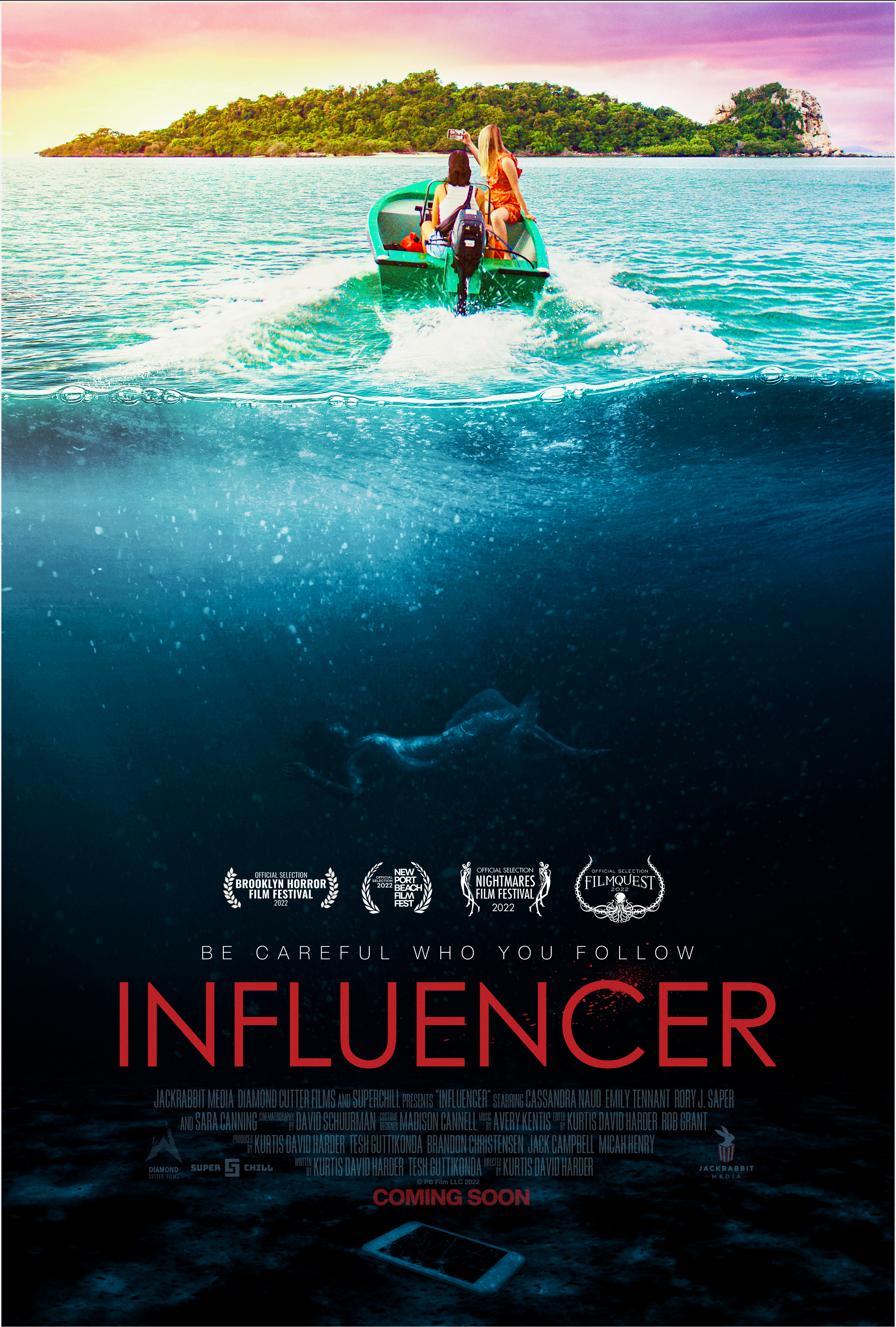
- Film poster
- Directed by: Kurtis David Harder
- Written by: Tesh Guttikonda; Kurtis David Harder
- Produced by: Jack Campbell; Brandon Christensen; Tesh Guttikonda; Kurtis David Harder; Micah Henry
- Starring: Emily Tennant; Cassandra Naud; Rory J. Saper; Sara Canning
- Cinematography: David Schuurman
- Edited by: Rob Grant; Kurtis David Harder
- Music by: Avery Kentis
- Production companies: Octane Entertainment; Superchill
- Distributed by: Shudder
- Release dates: October 16, 2022 (Brooklyn Horror Film Festival); May 26, 2023 (Shudder)
- Running time: 92 minutes
- Country: United States
- Language: English

Influencer is a 2022 American thriller film directed by Kurtis David Harder from a screenplay he co-wrote with Tesh Guttikonda. It stars Cassandra Naud, Emily Tennant, Rory J. Saper and Sara Canning. The film had its world premiere at the Brooklyn Horror Film Festival on October 16, 2022 and was released on Shudder on May 26, 2023. A sequel titled Influencers was released on Shudder in 2025.

== Plot ==
Madison is an influencer who has been using her vacation in Thailand as a way to promote herself and several advertisers online. The reality is that Madison spends most of her time in her hotel drinking and getting new products and upset that her boyfriend, Ryan, did not come with her.

Madison is befriended by CW, a young woman with a birthmark under her right eye, who takes her on a tour of hotspots. They return to find that someone had broken into Madison's room and stolen her passport. CW suggests that Madison extend her vacation while waiting for a replacement. She agrees, and CW takes Madison to an island, where she abandons the influencer; she did the same with other women. CW then returns so that she can enjoy living Madison's lifestyle, with Madison's social media accounts and freedom to deepfake herself into manipulated videos and voice recordings for posts. She then decides to approach another influencer, Jessica, who bases her brand off teamwork and friendship. Using her same MO, CW gains her trust, especially when, the night after, CW breaks into Jessica's room to make it seem her passport is missing.

The two women later travel back to a house where Madison and CW spent the night before the latter left Madison stranded. Apparently, the house was Madison's, but paid for by Ryan, who is now at the house, waiting for Madison, as he had been hoping to surprise her with a proposal. CW lies and says that Madison allowed her to stay. Jessica becomes more suspicious as they tour, making connections about how similar both Jessica's and Madison's friendship with CW were. She attempts to leave and confronts CW, who stabs her with her high-heeled shoe.

CW then proceeds to trick Ryan into believing that Madison broke up with him and began sleeping with other men. Ryan reminisces and begins investigating his suspicions. The lies are disproven, and Ryan discovers that CW abducted Madison and had been impersonating her, taking advantage from the fact that, since online friends aren't really close to you, no one would know you died. He tries to force CW to take him to Madison, but CW murders him and posts lies about him online using Madison's account.

CW then returns to the island to dump the bodies, in the process discovering that Madison is still alive. Madison manages to overcome CW while she is searching for the influencer and steals the boat, which she rides back to civilization. CW watches Madison ride off with a smile.

== Cast ==
- Cassandra Naud as CW
- Emily Tennant as Madison
- Rory J. Saper as Ryan Evans
- Sara Canning as Jessica Tiegan
- Paul Spurrier as Rupert
- Justin Sams as Jay

== Release ==
Influencer had its world premiere on October 16, 2022 at the Brooklyn Horror Film Festival. The film went on to screen at other film festivals and was picked up in February 2023 for North and Latin America, the U.K., Ireland, Australia, New Zealand, Spain and Portugal by the streaming service Shudder, which released the movie on May 26, 2023.

== Reception ==
On the review aggregator website Rotten Tomatoes, 92% of 49 critics' reviews are positive, with an average rating of 7/10. The website's consensus reads: "Influencer should get plenty of likes from horror fans hungry for a smart, scary chiller with something to say." Metacritic, which uses a weighted average, assigned the film a score of 66 out of 100, based on 6 critics, indicating "generally favorable" reviews.

Brandon Yu of The New York Times wrote, "Harder has made good and entertaining use of a premise that could have become a simple gimmick, and Naud and Saper prove strong leads as their characters try to read each other between the likes." Phil Hoad of The Guardian gave the film 3/5 stars, calling it a "smartly arranged thriller" and writing, "Harder and co-writer Tesh Guttikonda don't delve beneath the skin of their characters enough to fully flesh out their critique and bring Influencer into full psychological thriller territory... But the four-part shuffle keeps it lively, and Naud is an imposing black hole." Noel Murray of the Los Angeles Times said the film "has the same kind of crafty plot as a Patricia Highsmith novel, taking audiences so deep inside the machinations of not-so-nice people that we're left wondering where our sympathies should lie."

== Sequel ==
A sequel titled Influencers premiered at the 29th Fantasia International Film Festival in July 2025. Cassandra Naud reprised her role from the first film. The film was released on Shudder on December 12, 2025.

== Accolades ==
Year	Award / Festival	Category	Recipient(s)	Result	Ref.
2020	Slamdance Screenplay Competition	Horror/Thriller	Kurtis David Harder and Tesh Guttikonda	Nominated	
2022	Blood in the Snow Canadian Film Festival	Best Lead Acting Performance in a Feature	Cassandra Naud	Won	
2022	Blood in the Snow Canadian Film Festival	Best Screenplay	Kurtis David Harder and Tesh Guttikonda	Won	
2022	Blood in the Snow Canadian Film Festival	Best Cinematography	David Schuurman	Won	
2022	Blood in the Snow Canadian Film Festival	Best Musical Score	Avery Kentis	Nominated	
2022	FilmQuest	Best Director	Kurtis David Harder	Won	
2022	FilmQuest	Best Supporting Actor	Emily Tennant	Won	
2022	FilmQuest	Best Cinematography	David Schuurman	Won	
2022	FilmQuest	Best Feature Film	Kurtis David Harder	Nominated	
2022	FilmQuest	Best Screenplay – Feature	Kurtis David Harder and Tesh Guttikonda	Nominated	
2022	FilmQuest	Best Actress	Cassandra Naud	Nominated	
2022	FilmQuest	Best Supporting Actor - Feature	Rory J. Saper	Nominated	
2022	FilmQuest	Best Editing - Feature	Rob Grant and Kurtis David Harder	Nominated	
2022	FilmQuest	Best Score - Feature	Avery Kentis	Nominated	
2022	FilmQuest	Best Sound	Joe Barrucco and Kristopher Laflamme	Nominated	
