= Influencers (film) =

2025 film by Kurtis David Harder

- Film Poster
- Directed by: Kurtis David Harder
- Written by: Kurtis David Harder
- Produced by: Jack Campbell; Chris Ball; Taylor Nodrick; Rebecca Campbell; Kurtis David Harder; Micah Henry
- Starring: Cassandra Naud; Emily Tennant; Georgina Campbell; Lisa Delamar; Jonathan Whitesell; Veronica Long; Dylan Playfair
- Cinematography: David Schuurman
- Edited by: Rob Grant; Kurtis David Harder
- Music by: Avery Kentis
- Production company: Jackrabbit Media
- Distributed by: Shudder
- Release dates: July 26, 2025 (Fantasia); December 12, 2025 (United States)
- Running time: 110 minutes
- Countries: Canada; United States
- Language: English

Influencers is a 2025 horror thriller film written, directed, produced and edited by Kurtis David Harder. It is a sequel to the film Influencer (2022), starring Cassandra Naud and Emily Tennant reprising their roles from the first film, with Georgina Campbell, Lisa Delamar, Jonathan Whitesell, Veronica Long, and Dylan Playfair in supporting roles. The film is a co-production between Canada and the United States. It had its world premiere at the 29th Fantasia International Film Festival on July 26, 2025, and was released on Shudder on December 12, 2025.

== Plot ==
A woman is seen in her luxury house, distraught by unseen notifications on her phone, before slitting her own throat.

In Southern France, CW —having escaped from Thailand and started a new life— and her girlfriend, Diane, are celebrating their first anniversary. CW becomes frustrated by influencer Charlotte, who took their hotel suite at the last minute, complains constantly, and keeps asking the couple to attend various events. So CW takes her to a secluded landmark and pushes her to her death, and then impersonates her on social media.

After the trip, Diane becomes suspicious of CW's behavior and searches her belongings, finding fake passports and links to previous murders, including Charlotte's. CW tries to talk her way out, but Diane calls her a psychopath. Infuriated, CW strangles Diane to death, but immediately regrets it and escapes to Bali. There, CW uses Diane's voice to create a personal A.I. assistant to cope with her grief and help her automate her deepfakes and crimes.

Meanwhile, influencer Madison White, who escaped CW last year, has been keeping a low profile due to constant media scrutiny and harassment as the only suspect of two murders committed by CW (still unfound and unidentified), despite being cleared all of charges. When she learns about Charlotte's murder, she tracks down Diane's mom online, who tells her CW is in Bali.

In Bali, both Madison and CW encounter Jacob, an alt-right streamer and influencer. They both use Jacob against the other, each telling him that the other cannot be trusted. CW hacks his computer and posts a sex tape he filmed with his alt-right influencer girlfriend Ariana, who is the woman from the start of the movie. Ariana kills herself just before Madison arrives, lured by CW. Jacob finds the two shortly after and accuses Madison of killing his girlfriend.

CW turns up and gets into a physical fight with Madison, ending with Jacob stabbed and CW knocked out. Madison uses CW's phone to find her hideout, and she enlists AI-Diane to help execute her revenge.

When Jacob discovers that CW posted the sex tape, she stabs him to death. Only Madison activated his livestream to broadcast the murder to all of his followers. When Jacob's best friend arrives with his entourage, CW snaps and kills him, maniacally chasing down everyone else as the credits roll.

== Cast ==
- Cassandra Naud as CW / "Catherine Weaver"
- Emily Tennant as Madison White
- Georgina Campbell as Charlotte Smith
- Lisa Delamar as Diane Moreau
- Jonathan Whitesell as Jacob Sullivan
- Veronica Long as Ariana Winter
- Dylan Playfair as Cameron

== Production ==
=== Development ===
On May 6, 2025, it was announced that director Kurtis David Harder had wrapped shooting Influencers, the sequel to his 2022 horror film Influencer. It was also announced that Cassandra Naud would reprise her role from the first film, and that the ensemble cast includes Georgina Campbell, Lisa Delamar, Jonathan Whitesell, Veronica Long, and Dylan Playfair.

The film is a co-production between Canada and the United States. It was produced by Jackrabbit Media's Jack Campbell, Chris Ball, Taylor Nodrick, Rebecca Campbell, Kurtis David Harder and Micah Henry. Harder co-edited the film with Rob Grant. Jackrabbit Media also holds worldwide rights and sold the film to international buyers at the 2025 Cannes Film Festival.

Deadline described the film as "set in the picturesque landscapes of southern France, the sequel watches as a young woman's chilling fascination with murder and identity theft sends her life into a whirlwind of chaos. Pic deepens a cinematic universe built around themes of deception, online identity, and the darker sides of curated personas, offering an expanded canvas compared to the original."

Harder said about the film:

With Influencers, I wanted to revisit the themes of control and illusion, but from a new angle — one that's more seductive, more dangerous, and more unhinged. It's a film that plays with perception. Fans of Influencer will feel something familiar beneath the surface, but the real fun is discovering just how deep those connections run.

=== Filming ===
Filming took place in Bali, Canada, and France over four months in 2024 with a small crew of 15 people.

=== Marketing ===
On July 21, 2025, Letterboxd released a clip from the film featuring Naud and Campbell on its social media platforms.

== Release ==
The film had its world premiere at the 29th Fantasia International Film Festival in the Septentrion Shadows section on July 26, 2025. It was the closing film at FrightFest, where it made its UK premiere in August 2025. Streaming service Shudder holds distribution rights for English-speaking territories.

It also screened in the Borsos Competition program at the 2025 Whistler Film Festival, and closed the Blood in the Snow Film Festival in Toronto on November 22, 2025, ahead of its December 12, 2025 release on Shudder.

== Reception ==
=== Critical response ===
On the review aggregator website Rotten Tomatoes, 96% of 45 critics' reviews are positive. The website's consensus reads: "Influencers is a sharper, darker, and gleefully vicious sequel that skewers hollow influencer culture with stylish carnage and delicious black humor." Metacritic, which uses a weighted average, assigned the film a score of 75 out of 100, based on 7 critics, indicating "generally favorable" reviews.

In his review for Variety, Dennis Harvey said that Influencers is "a worthy sequel that maintains the original's upscale gloss and narrative twistiness while adding a sufficient number of new wrinkles".

Mary Beth McAndrews of Dread Central gave the film 4.5 out of 5 stars and wrote, "Naud once again shines as CW, weaponizing her slight, femme frame to craft your worst nightmare in human form. When she's with Diane, Naud really does let CW shine, smiling bigger and more genuinely than we've ever seen from the character. There's a levity and light around her that's sadly suffocated by her dark, obsessive needs. Both Harder's script and Naud's performance bring CW's character to new heights that highlight her complexity as a character, but never forgive or excuse her violent actions", and added, "Harder and Naud have made something special here, and with Influencers, they've proved it's not just lightning in a bottle. Expanding the scope and developing CW's character into something much more complex and almost sympathetic makes this a stellar sequel that filmmakers of all budget levels can learn from."

Joe Lipsett of Bloody Disgusting called Influencers "a great sequel that takes the series in a fun, satirical, and often deliciously mean new direction".

=== Accolades ===
| Award / Festival | Date of ceremony | Category | Recipient(s) | Result | Ref. |
|---|---|---|---|---|---|
| Blood in the Snow Canadian Film Festival | November 22, 2025 | Best Picture | Kurtis David Harder | Won | |
| Blood in the Snow Canadian Film Festival | November 22, 2025 | Best Director | Kurtis David Harder | Won | |
| Blood in the Snow Canadian Film Festival | November 22, 2025 | Best Cinematography in a Feature | David Schuurman | Won | |
| Blood in the Snow Canadian Film Festival | November 22, 2025 | Best Editing in a Feature | Robert Grant and Kurtis David Harder | Won | |
| Blood in the Snow Canadian Film Festival | November 22, 2025 | Best Screenplay in a Feature | Kurtis David Harder | Nominated | |
| Blood in the Snow Canadian Film Festival | November 22, 2025 | Best Lead Acting Performance in a Feature Film | Cassandra Naud | Nominated | |
| Blood in the Snow Canadian Film Festival | November 22, 2025 | Best Supporting Acting Performance in a Feature Film | Emily Tennant | Nominated | |
| Blood in the Snow Canadian Film Festival | November 22, 2025 | Best Music Score in a Feature | Avery Kentis | Nominated | |
| Whistler Film Festival | December 7, 2025 | Borsos Competition for Best Canadian Feature Film | Kurtis David Harder | Nominated | |
| Whistler Film Festival | December 7, 2025 | UBCP/ACTRA Northern Star Award | Cassandra Naud | Won | |
| Brooklyn Horror Film Festival | October 27, 2025 | Audience Choice Award | Kurtis David Harder | Won | |
