= Cassandra Naud =

Canadian actress (born 1992)

- Born: 16 April 1992 (age 34); Fort McMurray, Alberta, Canada
- Education: American Musical and Dramatic Academy (BFA)
- Occupations: Actress; dancer
- Years active: 2015–present

Cassandra Naud (born 16 April 1992) is a Canadian actress. She starred as serial killer CW in the horror film Influencer (2022) and its sequel Influencers (2025).

== Early life ==
Naud was born in Fort McMurray, Alberta. Naud was born with a large nevus under her right eye. Her parents decided against removing it after doctors informed them that the procedure was "risky." She has stated she experienced extensive bullying as a child due to her nevus. Naud started dancing at the age of five. She later attended the Bachelor of Fine Arts program for dance and theater at the American Musical and Dramatic Academy (AMDA) in Los Angeles, from which she graduated in 2014.

== Career ==
In 2015, Naud became prominent after an article about her refusal to remove her birthmark was published in the Daily Mail. The resulting exposure helped her book a role in the music video for Leona Lewis's single "Fire Under My Feet", after the director read the Daily Mail article and asked her to audition.

In 2022, she starred as serial killer named "CW" in the horror film Influencer. The film received positive reviews from critics, who praised Naud's performance. Phil Hoad of The Guardian wrote that Naud "holds her own as a kind of social media Tom Ripley", and Brandon Yu of The New York Times wrote that "Naud and Saper prove strong leads as their characters try to read each other between the likes." Brian Tallerico of RogerEbert.com her performance "great" and wrote that the film "belongs to Naud, who can be both captivating and terrifying in the same beat." For her role in Influencer, Naud won a Bloodie Award for Best Lead Performance in a feature film at that year's Blood in the Snow Canadian Film Festival. In 2025, Naud reprised the role of CW in a sequel titled Influencers, for which she was nominated for another Bloodie Award in the same category which she had previously won for the first film.

In 2023, Naud appeared in the Christmas slasher It's a Wonderful Knife, alongside Joel McHale, Katharine Isabelle, and Justin Long.

In June 2025, Naud joined the cast of Mike Flanagan's upcoming miniseries Carrie, based on the 1974 novel of the same name by Stephen King. The series screened in the Primetime section of the 2026 Toronto International Film Festival before it was released on Amazon Prime Video in October.

== Filmography ==
Key
†	Denotes films that have not yet been released

=== Film ===
Year	Title	Role	Notes
2019	A Cinderella Story: Christmas Wish	Elf Performer	Acting Debut
2021	A Cinderella Story: Starstruck	Hoedown Dancer #9	
2023	Influencer	CW	
2023	It's a Wonderful Knife	Karen Simmons	
2025	Influencers	CW / "Catherine Weaver"	

=== Television ===
Key
†	Denotes television productions that have not yet been released

Year	Title	Role	Notes
2019	See	Shadow Warrior #1	"Plastic" (season 1; episode 5) "Silk" (season 1; episode 6) "The Lavender Road" (season 1; episode 7)
2020	Loudermilk	Cappuccino	"Hit Me Baby One More Time" (season 3; episode 4) "Should Have Known Better" (season 3; episode 9)
2020	Snowpiercer	Fiona	Episode: "These Are His Revolutions" (season 1; episode 8)
2025	Tracker	Margo Webster	Episode: "Angel" (season 3; episode 6)
2026	Carrie	Sable	Recurring role; 3 episodes

=== Music videos ===
Year	Title	Artist	Notes
2015	"Fire Under My Feet"	Leona Lewis	

== Awards and nominations ==
Award / Festival	Year	Category	Work	Result	Ref.
Blood in the Snow Canadian Film Festival	2022	Best Lead Acting Performance in a Feature	Influencer	Won	
Blood in the Snow Canadian Film Festival	2025	Best Lead Acting Performance in a Feature	Influencers	Nominated	
FilmQuest	2022	Best Actress	Influencer	Nominated	
Whistler Film Festival	2025	UBCP/ACTRA Northern Star Award	Influencers	Won	
