= Still/Born =

2017 horror film directed by Brandon Christensen

- Promotional release poster
- Directed by: Brandon Christensen
- Written by: Brandon Christensen; Colin Minihan
- Produced by: Chris Ball; Kurtis David Harder; Colin Minihan
- Starring: Christie Burke; Jesse Moss; Rebecca Olson; Jenn Griffin; Michael Ironside
- Cinematography: Bradley Stuckel
- Music by: Blitz//Berlin
- Production companies: Digital Interference Productions; Hadron Films
- Distributed by: Vertical Entertainment
- Release date: April 29, 2017 (Overlook Film Festival)
- Running time: 87 minutes
- Country: Canada
- Language: English

Still/Born is a 2017 Canadian psychological horror film directed and co-written by Brandon Christensen and starring Christie Burke and Jesse Moss. The film follows Mary (Burke), a first-time mother who gives birth to twins, only to tragically lose one of them (Thomas) during childbirth. Struggling with the devastating loss and the sudden demands of motherhood, she is diagnosed with severe postpartum depression.

It premiered on April 29, 2017, at the Overlook Film Festival and received generally positive reviews, with critics praising Burke's performance as Mary. At the festival, the film was awarded the Scariest Feature Award.

== Plot ==
Mary (Christie Burke), in her first pregnancy, gives birth to twins. However, only one of them survives. Mary then starts showing postpartum depression symptoms, and becomes convinced that an evil entity wants to take her surviving baby.

After Mary's husband leaves for a business trip, and after some events transpire, Mary starts to fear for her child's life.

== Cast ==
- Christie Burke as Mary
- Jesse Moss as Jack
- Rebecca Olson as Rachel
- Jenn Griffin as Jane
- Michael Ironside as Dr. Neilson

== Reception ==
'Still/Born' celebrated its World Premiere at the 2017 Overlook Film Festival in Mount Hood, Oregon. Additionally, the film was also awarded the festival's Scariest Feature Award. The jurors noted that, "STILL/BORN freaked us all out in the best way possible. As a worthy entry in the classic sub genre of pregnancy horror stretching back to ROSEMARY'S BABY, it combines visceral chills and a creepy atmosphere into a perfectly terrifying package."

On review aggregator Rotten Tomatoes, Still/Born has an approval rating of 67% based on 21 reviews. The site's critical consensus reads: "Still/Born puts an intriguing psychological spin on its supernatural horror story, elevated by standout work from star Christie Burke." On Metacritic, another review aggregator, the film has a weighted average score of 63 out of 100, based on 4 critics, meaning "generally favorable reviews".

Noel Murray of the Los Angeles Times wrote: "First-time feature director Brandon Christensen brings some impressive snap to the postnatal spook-show 'Still/Born.' Christensen and co-writer Colin Minihan mostly repeat old beats from suburban supernatural horror films like 'Poltergeist' and 'Paranormal Activity,' but strong actors and lean, unfussy storytelling ought to be more than enough to please genre buffs." Frank Scheck of The Hollywood Reporter stated: "Tapping into elemental motherhood fears, not to mention the specter of post-partum depression, Still/Born works most effectively in its subtler, more enigmatic moments than when it indulges in familiar horror film conventions. Nevertheless, it does offer a consistent level of tension, a few decent scares and a terrific lead turn by Christie Burke." Nick Allen of RogerEbert.com gave the film 3 out of 4 stars and said: "'Still/Born' doesn't get as many points as one would hope for originality. But this is an inspired-enough take on a woman's horror, where the fear of losing her other baby becomes a terror itself, as expressed through an excellent performance."
