= Brittany Allen =

Canadian actress (born 1986)

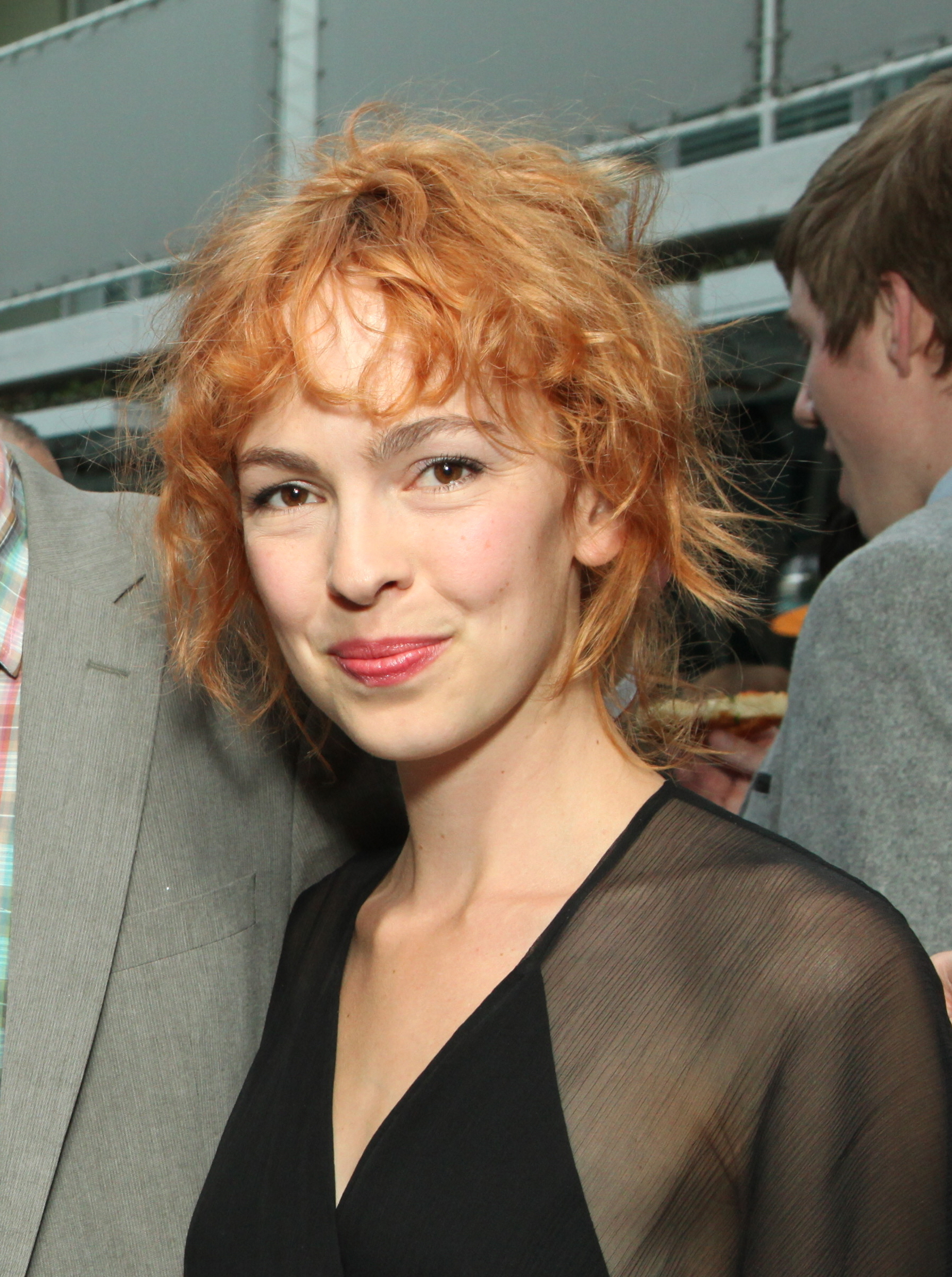
- Allen in 2013
- Born: February 5, 1986 (age 40); Toronto, Ontario, Canada
- Occupations: Actress; producer; composer
- Years active: 1999–present
- Children: 1
- Awards: Daytime Emmy Award; 2011 Outstanding Younger Actress

Brittany Allen (born February 5, 1986) is a Canadian actress. Her first notable role was as Marissa Chandler on All My Children from 2009 to 2010, for which she received a Daytime Emmy Award for Outstanding Younger Actress in 2011. In later years, she worked consistently on television, and in the films of her partner, Colin Minihan, including the 2014 film Extraterrestrial, the 2016 film It Stains the Sands Red and the 2018 film What Keeps You Alive, the latter of which Allen starred in and scored. For her role as Roxie Hamler, a terminally ill cancer patient, on the second season of The Pitt, she was nominated for a 2026 Primetime Emmy Award for Outstanding Guest Actress in a Drama Series.

== Education ==
She attended Etobicoke School of the Arts in Toronto, and the Sheridan Institute for Technology and Advanced Learning in Oakville, Ontario, for their Music Theatre – Performance Program.

== Career ==
After a few minor roles in TV movies, Allen played the role of Marissa Chandler on All My Children from April 21, 2009 to December 21, 2010. For this role, she earned a Daytime Emmy Award in 2011 in the category Younger Actress in a Drama Series. She went on to appear in several TV series, with recurring roles in the Canadian drama Bomb Girls and the American science fiction western Defiance on the Syfy network.

In 2014, she played the lead role in the science fiction horror film Extraterrestrial, directed by Colin Minihan of The Vicious Brothers, with whom Allen started an ongoing personal and professional relationship.

In 2015, Allen starred in the psychological thriller Backgammon and contributed to the writing of the story for the independent comedy-drama film, Almost Anything.

In 2016, she teamed up with Minihan again for the unconventional zombie film It Stains the Sands Red, where Allen acted as executive producer and starred as a lone woman being chased by a single, relentless zombie throughout the desert.

In 2017, Allen starred in the science fiction drama Incontrol. She also had a co-starring role in the horror film Jigsaw, a sequel to the Saw film franchise.

In 2018, she appeared on the USA Network series Falling Water, replacing Brooke Bloom in the role of Sabine for the series' second season. She also played the role of Ella Riordan in the second season of NBC's "Taken". The same year she co-starred alongside her Jigsaw co-star Hannah Emily Anderson in the thriller What Keeps You Alive, which she also produced and scored. The film marks her third collaboration with Colin Minihan.

In 2019, she appeared in the horror film The Prodigy as Margaret St. James. The same year she appeared as Charlotte/Popclaw in the Amazon superhero black comedy television series, The Boys.

== Personal life ==
In 2014, she started dating Canadian director Colin Minihan, whom she met on the set of Extraterrestrial, which he directed and in which she starred.

== Filmography ==
=== Film ===
Year	Title	Role	Notes
2008	The Rocker	I Heart Matt Girl	
2012	Dead Before Dawn	Lucy Winthrop	
2014	Extraterrestrial	April	
2015	Backgammon	Miranda	
2015	Farhope Tower	Susan	
2015	Look Again	Tanya	
2016	It Stains the Sands Red	Molly	Also executive producer
2017	The Definites	Bernie	
2017	Incontrol	Naomi	
2017	Jigsaw	Carly	
2018	What Keeps You Alive	Jules	Also executive producer and composer
2019	The Prodigy	Margaret St. James	
2025	Coyotes	Julie	Also composer
2026	The Yeti	Ellie Bannister	

=== Television ===
Year	Title	Role	Notes
1999	What Katy Did	Cecy Hall	Television film
1999	Restless Spirits	Stacey	Television film
2000	Virtual Mom	Melinda	Television film
2001	Walter and Henry	June	Television film
2002	I Love Mummy	Izzie	Episode: "James Falls in Love"
2003	Street Time	Connie	Episode: "Follow the Money"
2004	Prom Queen: The Marc Hall Story	Britney 2	Television film
2008	Mayday	Sandy Purl	Episode: "Southern Storm"
2009	The Listener	Leslie Cahill	Episode: "My Sister's Keeper"
2009–2010	All My Children	Marissa Tasker	Regular role
2010	Abroad	Friday Livingstone	Television film
2012	Bomb Girls	Hazel MacDugall	Recurring role
2013	Lost Girl	Della	Episode: "Delinquents"
2013	Defiance	Tirra	Recurring role (season 1)
2013	Satisfaction	Ashley	Episode: "Fade to Blackened"
2013	Played	Beth	Episode: "Money"
2013	Republic of Doyle	Amy Cohen	Episode: "Young Guns"
2014	Warehouse 13	Laura Roth	Episode: "Endless"
2014	Saving Hope	Megan	Episode: "The Other Side of Midnight"
2015	Schitt's Creek	Bree	Episode: "Carl's Funeral"
2016	Girl in the Box	Bonnie	Television film
2018	Separated at Birth	Lucy Pierce	Television film
2018	Falling Water	Sabine Brighton	Recurring role (season 2)
2018	Taken	Ella Riordan	Episodes: "Password", "Viceroy”
2019	The Boys	Charlotte/Popclaw	3 episodes
2024–2025	Dexter: Original Sin	Laura Moser	Recurring role
2026	The Pitt	Roxie Hamler	Recurring role (season 2)

== Awards and nominations ==
Allen won the Daytime Emmy Award for Outstanding Younger Actress in a Drama Series in 2011 for playing Marissa Tasker on All My Children. For her guest role on The Pitt, she was nominated for a 2026 Primetime Emmy Award for Outstanding Guest Actress in a Drama Series, having submitted herself for the nomination.
