= Sean Oliver =

Sean Oliver may refer to:

- Sean Harris Oliver, Canadian actor and playwright
- Sean Oliver, (1963–1990), member of the band Rip Rig + Panic
