= Kurtis David Harder =

Canadian actor, writer, and director

- Born: Calgary, Alberta, Canada
- Occupation: Filmmaker
- Years active: 2017–present

Kurtis David Harder is a Canadian filmmaker. He has directed at least five feature films. His work as a director includes Incontrol (2017), Spiral (2019), as well as Influencer (2022) and its sequel Influencers (2025). His work as a producer includes Still/Born (2017), What Keeps You Alive (2018), and V/H/S/94 (2021).

== Career ==
Born in Calgary, Alberta, Harder began his career working as a cinematographer in 2017. He has also produced various feature films such as Still/Born (2017), What Keeps You Alive (2018), and V/H/S/94 (2021).

Harder has directed at least five feature films. Harder made his feature-length debut with Cody Fitz (2011). His second feature film, Incontrol, was released in 2017. Harder wrote the first draft of the screenplay for Incontrol in 2013.

Another feature film, Spiral, was released in 2019.

In 2022, he directed the feature film Influencer (2022), which was acquired and released by Shudder. Influencer had its world premiere on October 16, 2022, at the Brooklyn Horror Film Festival. Brandon Yu of The New York Times wrote, "Harder has made good and entertaining use of a premise that could have become a simple gimmick, and Naud and Saper prove strong leads as their characters try to read each other between the likes."

A sequel titled Influencers premiered at the 29th Fantasia International Film Festival in July 2025. Cassandra Naud reprised her role from the first film. It was also the closing film at FrightFest, where it made its UK premiere in August 2025. The film will be released on Shudder on December 12, 2025, after screening as the closing night film at Blood in the Snow in Toronto.

== Reception ==
In 2020, Harder was described by Wicked Horror "one of the most fascinating and inventive voices working in horror today."

== Filmography ==
=== Film ===
Year	Title	Director	Producer	Writer	Notes
2011	Cody Fitz	Yes	Yes	Yes	
2017	Incontrol	Yes	Yes	Yes	
2019	Spiral	Yes	Yes	No	
2020	Summerland	Yes	Yes	Yes	
2023	Influencer	Yes	Yes	Yes	
2025	Influencers	Yes	Yes	Yes	

Producer only

- Still/Born (2017)
- Fake Blood (2017)
- Knuckleball (2018)
- What Keeps You Alive (2018)
- Harpoon (2019)
- Z (2019)
- Superhost (2020)
- V/H/S/94 (2021)
- Shadow of God (2025)
- Bodycam (2025)
