= The Wedding March (film series) =

2016 American-Canadian television film series

- Jack Wagner and Jodie Bissett in a promotional photo from the first film in the series
- Genre: Romantic comedy
- Starring: Jack Wagner; Josie Bissett
- Original language: English

Production
- Producer: Harvey Kahn
- Production company: A Wedding Production

Original release
- Network: Hallmark Channel
- Release: June 25, 2016 – August 14, 2021

The Wedding March is an American-Canadian made for television romantic comedy film series starring Jack Wagner and Josie Bissett. Written by Neal H. Dobrofsky and Tippi Dobrofsky, the films were originally broadcast on the Hallmark Channel from 2016 to 2021.

== Cast ==
- Jack Wagner as Mick Turner, a has-been singer and widower who owns the Willow Lake Inn in Vermont
- Josie Bissett as Olivia "Livvy" Phillips-Pershing, Mick's college girlfriend and single mother
- Emily Tennant as Grace Pershing, Olivia's daughter
- Aaron Pearl as Duke, an old friend of Mick and Olivia's who is also the head chef at the Inn
- Sarah Grey as Julie Turner, Mick's daughter
- Mitch Ainley as Wyatt, Julie's boyfriend
- Susan Hogan as Nora Phillips, Olivia's mother
- Serge Houde as Johnny, Nora's boyfriend

=== Characters summary ===
- A dark grey cell indicates the character was not in the film.

Character	Title					
Character	The Wedding March	Resorting to Love	Here Comes the Bride	Something Old, Something New	My Boyfriend's Back	Sealed with a Kiss
Mick Turner	Jack Wagner	Jack Wagner	Jack Wagner	Jack Wagner	Jack Wagner	Jack Wagner
Olivia Phillips-Pershing	Josie Bissett	Josie Bissett	Josie Bissett	Josie Bissett	Josie Bissett	Josie Bissett
Grace Pershing	Emily Tennant	Emily Tennant		Emily Tennant		
Duke	Aaron Pearl	Aaron Pearl	Aaron Pearl	Aaron Pearl	Aaron Pearl	
Julie Turner	Sarah Grey	Sarah Grey	Sarah Grey			
Wyatt		Mitch Ainley	Mitch Ainley			
Nora Phillips	Susan Hogan		Susan Hogan			Susan Hogan
Johnny	Serge Houde		Serge Houde			Serge Houde

== Films ==
No.	Title	Directed by	Written by	Original release date
1	"The Wedding March"	Neill Fearnley	Neal Dobrofsky, Tippi Dobrofsky	June 25, 2016
With her own successful business, and a full-grown daughter, single mother Olivia Persching (Josie Bissett) is looking forward to her upcoming nuptials to successful New York realtor Josh Johnson (Cameron Bancroft). At her daughter Grace's (Emily Tennant) suggestion, Olivia books the picturesque Willow Lake Inn in Vermont for her wedding. She is shocked to discover that the inn is owned and run by her college sweetheart, Mick Turner (Jack Wagner), and even more dismayed when she learns that Mick will be the singer at her wedding, after her previously booked band cancels at the last moment. The pair haven't seen each other for over two decades, and parted on bad terms. Olivia and Mick's reunion is plagued by animosity. However that soon fades as old feelings resurface, encouraged by both Grace and Mick's teenage daughter Julie (Sarah Grey). Mick confesses his true feelings to Olivia at the rehearsal dinner, and she is left with the choice between going ahead with the wedding as planned or taking a second chance on first love.
2	"Wedding March 2: Resorting to Love"	David Weaver	Neal Dobrofsky, Tippi Dobrofsky	June 17, 2017
Olivia sells her house and hands over her business to her daughter, Grace and comes to live at the Willow Lake Inn with Mick. However, the two start out awkward with Olivia deciding to live in the Carriage House and taking things slow between them. She proposes that they work together to make the Inn the best wedding resort. Meanwhile, Mick's daughter Julie brings home her boyfriend, Wyatt making Mick uncomfortable. Olivia and Mick visit their competition inn nearby and poach the wedding of landscaper Chris (Aren Buchholz) and editor Corrine (Tara Wilson). The couple want to have Mick as their wedding singer and Mick works to help one of his choir singers overcome her stage fear. Olivia starts making changes to the Inn and the wedding starts becoming bigger than they anticipated leading to tensions between her and Mick. Eventually, they come together to work on the wedding when the groom suddenly develops cold feet.
3	"Wedding March 3: Here Comes the Bride"	David Weaver	Neal Dobrofsky, Tippi Dobrofsky	February 17, 2018
Mick and Olivia have been running the Inn successfully and have kept busy. They choose to take some time off to spend a romantic Valentines weekend but their plans suddenly change when Mick's sister, fashion designer Bonnie (Gabrielle Miller), Olivia's mother Nora and Mick's daughter Julie all decide to visit the couple over the same weekend. Bonnie brings home her fiance, Sean (Peter Benson) and wants to marry at the Inn but Mick is still suspicious of Sean who ran out on their band 20 years ago. Moreover, Julie informs Mick that she wants to quit school to become a chef adding to his worries and straining their relationship. Nora, visiting with her boyfriend Johnny, begins pressuring Olivia to be in a more committed relationship with Mick. Julie's boyfriend Wyatt is upset she is leaving school. Sean apologizes to Mick. Mick writes a song for Olivia and plans to surprise her at the town's Valentines Day benefit.
4	"Wedding March 4: Something Old, Something New"	Peter DeLuise	Robin Bernheim, Richard Manning, Tracy Andreen, David Golden	June 23, 2018
Abby (Merritt Patterson) and Rob (Andrew Walker) are very much in love and are about to be married at the Willow Lake Inn. However, Abby believes that she may not fit in with Rob's family, especially with his sister who continues to compare their wedding to the perfect wedding their parents had.
5	"Wedding March 5: My Boyfriend's Back"	Mike Rohl	Kim Beyer-Johnson	June 8, 2019
Annalise (Cindy Busby) starts her own wedding planning company but everything hangs on the first wedding that is being held at the Willow Lake Inn. When her ex-boyfriend, Brad (Tyler Hynes), shows up as the best man, she must set her feelings aside about their break-up and try and make the wedding a success. Meanwhile, Olivia and Mick have an important milestone coming up in their relationship and try to arrange a surprise for one another.
6	"Sealed with a Kiss: Wedding March 6"	David Weaver	Kim Beyer-Johnson	August 14, 2021
The modest wedding plans of a celebrity (Nathan Witte) and his down-to-earth fiancée (Caitlin Stryker) escalate while Mick gets an enticing opportunity Olivia won't let him refuse, putting their own big day in jeopardy.

== Production ==
=== Development ===
Following the success of its first "June Weddings" event in 2015 Hallmark announced that the event would return in 2016, with The Wedding March as one of the channel's line-up of original television movies.

The film saw stars Jack Wagner and Josie Bissett reunite after having both previously starred in the 1990s Fox television series Melrose Place. Wagner was also involved in the development of the film and served as an executive producer on the production.

Wagner's character teaches a choir and he also recorded music for the film.

=== Filming ===
Filming took place in Vancouver and British Columbia in April and May 2016. The second installment was also shot in Vancouver. The third installment in the franchise, entitled The Wedding March 3: Here Comes the Bride was filmed in British Columbia in May 2017, again starring Wagner and Bissett.

== Broadcast ==
The first film in the series aired on June 25, 2016, as part of the channel's second annual "June Weddings" event on Hallmark Channel.

== Reception ==
The first installment of the film garnered 2.3 million viewers on its premiere and was the top-rated cable network program of the day. On Twitter it became the number one Tweeted cable/broadcast television film of the week.
