= The Neddeaus of Duqesne Island =

Canadian comedy web series

The Neddeaus of Duqesne Island is a Canadian comedy web series, which premiered on the Canadian Broadcasting Corporation's streaming platform, CBC Gem, in 2017.

== Background ==
A mockumentary presented as "lost footage" of a 1970s-era documentary, the series focuses on the Neddeaus, a family who have lived in isolation on a remote Northern Ontario island and are being profiled in a documentary by filmmaker Ford Francis Mayflower. Its premiere was accompanied by Not for Broadcast, a short promotional trailer which explored the series' fictionalized backstory as a documentary film which was made in the 1970s, but suppressed by the CBC for political reasons and never seen by anyone outside of Canada's media and political elites until 2017; the trailer included commentary from public figures such as Jean Chrétien and David Suzuki.

== Cast and crew ==
Its cast includes Tara Samuel ('Vangeline Neddeau), Tim Walker (Biche Neddeau), Kelly McCormack (Eloida Neddeau), Aaron Schroeder (Elmer Neddeau), Caitlin Driscoll (Elène Neddeau), and Cara Gee (Anne) with narration by Colin Mochrie. Schroeder was the writer and creator of the series, and Schroeder and McCormack were the executive producers. The series was directed by Sam Zvibleman, best known for his work as creator and director of Pen15. Zvibleman makes a brief appearance in the series as director Ford Francis Mayflower.

== Accolades ==
The series received three Canadian Screen Award nominations at the 6th Canadian Screen Awards in 2018, for Best Direction in a Web Program or Series (Sam Zvibleman), Best Actor in a Web Program or Series (Schroeder) and Best Actress in a Web Program or Series (Samuel). Zvibleman won the award for Best Direction.
