= What Keeps You Alive =

2018 Canadian thriller film

- Film poster
- Directed by: Colin Minihan
- Written by: Colin Minihan
- Produced by: Kurtis David Harder; Chris Ball; Ben Knechtel
- Starring: Brittany Allen; Hannah Emily Anderson; Martha MacIsaac; Joey Klein
- Cinematography: David Schuurman
- Edited by: Colin Minihan
- Music by: Brittany Allen
- Release dates: March 10, 2018 (South by Southwest); August 24, 2018 (United States)
- Running time: 98 minutes
- Language: English

What Keeps You Alive is a 2018 Canadian psychological horror film written and directed by Colin Minihan. It stars Hannah Emily Anderson and Brittany Allen and follows a young woman fighting for her life as her wife's murderous intentions become evident.

The film premiered at the SXSW Film Festival on March 10, 2018. It received positive reviews from critics.

== Plot ==
Jackie and Jules, a young married couple, are celebrating their first anniversary at a remote cabin belonging to Jackie's family. Jules becomes suspicious when Jackie's childhood friend Sarah visits and addresses Jackie as "Megan". Jackie explains that she changed her name because it suits her better. Jackie gives Jules a locket containing a photo of them together, and they are seemingly reconciled.

Still concerned, Jules visits Sarah and her husband Daniel, who live across the lake. There, she learns that Jenny, a mutual friend of Sarah and Jackie's, drowned in the lake when they were young. Later, when questioned, Jackie claims that she never mentioned Jenny because she believed the accident was her fault, although the police had cleared her of any wrongdoing. Jules embraces her wife, consoling her. Moments later, while admiring the view of the wilderness, Jackie shoves Jules off the edge of a cliff.

Jackie returns to the cabin, practicing the tearful phone call she's going to make to the police when reporting Jules' death. However, Jules is still alive. When Jackie returns to the scene and discovers that Jules is no longer there, she searches the forest for her, sobbing and begging Jules for forgiveness. Jules, hiding nearby, is tempted to show herself until Jackie, unaware she's being watched, reveals her concern is an act. Jules flees, makes it to the house, and tends to her injuries. She then makes it halfway across the lake on a boat before Jackie catches up to her. Daniel sees the pair and, despite Jackie's threats, Jules arranges for them to come for dinner that evening.

Jackie reveals that she never loved Jules and intends to murder her to cash in on her life insurance policy. Sarah is suspicious of Jackie. Having threatened to kill both Sarah and Daniel, Jackie forces Jules to pretend everything is normal but catches Jules trying to get help from Sarah. She slits Daniel's throat outside, chases Sarah upstairs and fatally stabs her numerous times after confessing to Jenny's murder. Jackie forces Jules to help her dispose of the bodies. When asked how she became this way, Jackie reveals that she has simply always been devoid of sentiments or a conscience, saying it was "nature, not nurture". Jules peeks behind the stuffed head of a bear that Jackie supposedly killed as a child, and discovers a box containing necklaces that Jackie had given to her previous wives, confirming the situation happened several times.

Jackie drives Jules back to the cliff’s edge, intending to push her off again, but Jules manages to escape by stabbing her with a tranquilizer dart. Jules flees in the car, but returns to confront Jackie but finds her missing. Jules returns to the cabin and the two fight and Jackie knocks Jules out, and throws her over the same cliff as earlier. Confident that Jules is now dead, she calls the police. Jackie (who is diabetic), then injects herself with insulin but starts to feel woozy. She discovers through a video Jules had made before their confrontation that the insulin is replaced with hydrogen peroxide. The peroxide causes blood clots in Jackie's system, and after wandering in the woods, she collapses and dies of a stroke.

Back at the bottom of the cliff, Jules takes a sharp intake of breath and the film ends with flashbacks of the couple.

== Cast ==
- Hannah Emily Anderson as Jackie / Megan
  - Charlotte Lindsay Marron as Young Jackie
- Brittany Allen as Jules
- Martha MacIsaac as Sarah
- Joey Klein as Daniel

== Production ==
In the early stages of the film's development, the main characters were a husband and wife (rather than a same-sex couple). Filming took place in Muskoka, Ontario.

Allen composed the film's score, earning her first such credit.

== Release ==
What Keeps You Alive had its world premiere at the SXSW Film Festival on March 10, 2018. Since then, the film has also screened at Inside Out, the Sydney Film Festival, Cinepocalypse, and Popcorn Frights, as well as other festivals.

IFC Midnight acquired the film for distribution in the United States. The film opened in Los Angeles and New York on August 24, 2018. It became available through video on demand the same day.

== Reception ==
On review aggregator Rotten Tomatoes, the film holds an approval rating of 80% based on 54 reviews, with an average rating of 6.7/10. The site's critics' consensus reads: "Smart, stylish, and well-acted, What Keeps You Alive proves it's still possible to spin an engrossing horror yarn without fundamentally altering established formula." Metacritic reports a weighted average rating of 66 out of 100, based on 15 critics, indicating "generally favorable reviews".

Jamie Righetti of IndieWire gave the film a B+, writing "One of the most refreshing aspects of What Keeps You Alive is that the film offers a much-needed upgrade to the Final Girl trope", and praised the performances of Anderson and Allen and the scares in the film, but criticized its "few predictable beats". She concluded that the film "is a welcome look at what can happen when the Final Girl trope is allowed to evolve." Brad Wheeler, writing for The Globe and Mail, gave the film a score of 3 stars out of 4, describing the film as "a dark, visually appealing and occasionally implausible Canadian thriller". He concluded: "the victory of What Keeps You Alive is not its heart-thumping (and a little too long) second act, but the question of survival versus vengeance the film raises."

Andrew Whalen of Newsweek wrote that the film "sacrifices its most interesting possibilities in favor of the squat simplicity of the cinematic psychopath, erasing psychological complexity in otherwise compelling characters", and added: "What Keeps You Alive never finds a motivation for Jackie beyond a hidden nature—the serial killer within." He did conclude: "Scenes like the off-screen final confrontation ... could have been compelling if we believed this was a battle of minds. Instead, it feels like What Keeps You Alive denying us not just the psychological horror, but the visceral thrills too." What Keeps You Alive was ranked among the best LGBTQ-related horror films by His Name is Death.
