= Hitcher in the Dark =

- Directed by: Umberto Lenzi
- Screenplay by: Olga Pehar
- Story by: Umberto Lenzi
- Produced by: Joe D'Amato
- Cinematography: Jerry Phillips
- Music by: Carlo Maria Cordio
- Production company: Filmirage
- Release date: 1989
- Running time: 95 minutes
- Country: United States
- Language: English

Hitcher in the Dark (Italian: Paura nel buio) is a 1989 psychological thriller directed by Italian director Umberto Lenzi.

== Plot ==
Mark Glazer is a mentally disturbed young man, who has a sexual obsession for his dead mother. He drives around in his father's RV in order to pick up female hitchhikers to kidnap, assault, and murder so he can fulfill his sexual desires. One of the women he picks up is protagonist Daniela, who, unfortunately for her, strongly resembles his mother, and she is about to take her life's ride.

== Cast ==
- Joe Balogh as Mark Glazer
- Josie Bissett as Daniela Foster
- Jason Saucier as Kevin
- Robin Fox as Mark's Father

== Production ==
Hitcher in the Dark was made by Umberto Lenzi for Filmirage for crediting him as Humphrey Humbert on Ghosthouse. Lenzi claimed the film was influenced by The Collector while stating later concluding was disappointed with the film the ending of the film had to be changed.

== Release and reception ==
Hitcher in the Dark was first released in 1989. In GoreZone, Loris Curci called it a "well-crafted psychological thriller in the style of Lenzi's giallo shockers."
