= Emily Tennant =

Canadian actress (born 1990)

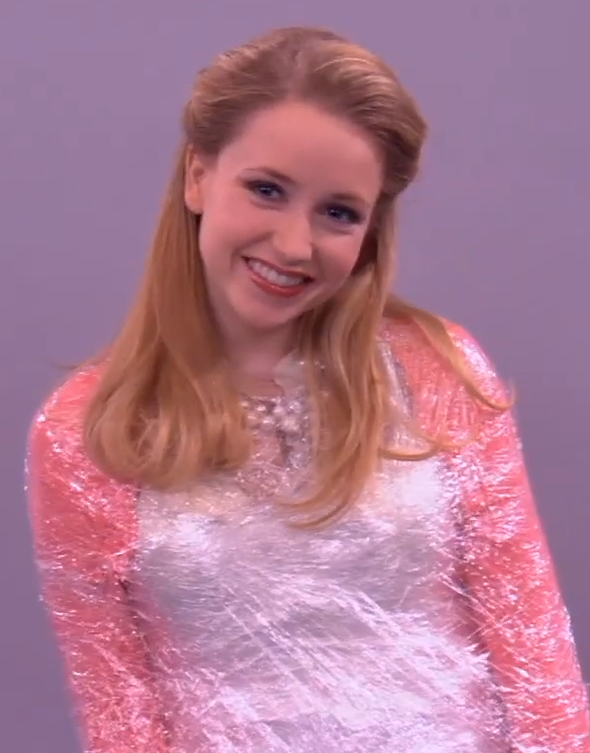
- Tennant as Ivy Young in Mr. Young (2011)
- Born: August 9, 1990 (age 36); Vancouver, British Columbia, Canada
- Occupation: Actress
- Years active: 2000–present

Emily Tennant (born August 9, 1990) is a Canadian actress. She played Ivy Young on the Canadian comedy television series Mr. Young, and voices Polly Pocket in the eponymous animated series.

== Early life ==
Tennant was born in Vancouver, British Columbia. She has one sister.

== Career ==
In 2000, she played her first role in the romantic comedy film, Personally Yours. After that, she could be seen in some minor roles in TV series and films. In 2004, she played a recurring role in the comedy horror series Kingdom Hospital. In 2005, Tennant had a minor role of The Sisterhood of the Traveling Pants.

She starred in the 2009 thriller, Zombie Punch. She won a Leo Award in the category Best Performance by a Female in a Short Drama for Valentines in 2009. Tennant played a main role in the Canadian teen sitcom Mr. Young (2011–13). In 2014–15, Tennant played Cecelia Rendall on the Hallmark Channel drama, Cedar Cove.

== Filmography ==
=== Film ===
Year	Title	Role	Notes
2002	The Rhino Brothers	Mellisa Kanachowski	
2002	Killer Bees!	Cassidy Harris	
2004	Scooby-Doo 2: Monsters Unleashed	Young Daphne Blake	
2004	I, Robot	Young Girl	
2005	The Sisterhood of the Traveling Pants	Krista Rodman	
2006	Dr. Dolittle 3	Party Kid #2	
2006	John Tucker Must Die	Hallway Girl	
2007	Juno	Pretty-to-Goth Girl	
2009	Zombie Punch	Paige Turner	
2009	I Love You, Beth Cooper	Raupp's Sophomore 2	
2009	Jennifer's Body	Gossiping Girl	
2010	Frankie & Alice	Paige (16 years old)	
2010	Flicka 2	Amy Walker	Direct-to-video
2010	Triple Dog	Sarah Algrenn	
2014	Way of the Wicked	Heather	
2014	Feed the Gods	Brit	
2016	USS Indianapolis: Men of Courage	Clara	
2018	Open 24 Hours	Debbie	
2020	Sniper: Assassin's End	Agent Juliet Clover	
2022	Influencer	Madison	
2023	Zoe.mp4	Alina	
2025	Influencers	Madison	
2027	Polly Pocket: The Movie	Polly Pocket	Voice role

=== Television ===
Year	Title	Role	Notes
2000	Dark Angel	Language Student 1	Episode: "Heat"
2000	Personally Yours	Hannah Stanton	Television film; also known as Wilderness Love
2003	Rockpoint P.D.	Tina	Episode: "Cat Got Your Tongue?"
2004	Kingdom Hospital	Mona Klingerman	Recurring role, 6 episodes
2004	The Days	Pretty Girl #2	Episode: "Day 1,385"
2005	Reunion	Girl	Episode: "1993"
2006	Masters of Horror	Teenage Blonde Girl	Episode: "Family"
2007	Destination: Infestation	Jamie Ross	Television film
2008	Sanctuary	Patricia Heathering	Episode: "Warriors"
2008	Riddles of the Sphinx	Karen	Television film
2009	Supernatural	Paris Hilton Fan #1	Episode: "Fallen Idols"
2009	Christmas in Canaan	Older Sarah	Television film
2010	Battle of the Bulbs	Susie Wallace	Television film
2011–2013	Mr. Young	Ivy Young	Main role
2011	Christmas Comes Home to Canaan	Sarah Burton	Television film
2014–2015	Cedar Cove	Cecilia Rendall	Recurring role, 10 episodes
2014	Some Assembly Required	Isabelle	Episode: "Just Like a Baby"
2014	Supernatural	Tasha	Episode: "Paper Moon"
2014	Driven Underground	Kristy	Television film
2015	A Novel Romance	Tabitha	Television film
2015	If There Be Thorns	Melodie Richarme	Television film
2015	Truth&Lies	Taylor	Television film; also known as Text to Kill
2016	The Wedding March	Grace Pershing	Television film
2016	Motive	Lexi Moore	Episodes: "Chronology of Pain", "We'll Always Have Homicide"
2016–2017	Legends of Tomorrow	Young Clarissa Stein	Episodes: "Compromised", "Beebo the God of War"
2017	A Surrogate's Nightmare	Shelly	Television film
2017	Daughter for Sale	Carly	Television film
2017	Dirk Gently's Holistic Detective Agency	The Beast	Recurring role, 5 episodes
2017	Marry Me at Christmas	Ginger Blake	Television film
2017	The Mechanics of Love	Clare Dupree	Television film
2017	Garage Sale Mystery: Murder by Text	Lita Merril	Television film
2018	Once Upon a Time	Isla	Episode: "Flower Child"
2018	Marvel Super Hero Adventures	Ghost Spider	Recurring voice role
2018	Wedding March 4: Something Old, Something New	Grace Pershing	Television film
2018–2025	Polly Pocket	Polly Pocket	Lead voice role
2019	Charmed	Angelica	Episode: "Touched by a Demon"
2019	My Little Pony: Friendship Is Magic	Mane Allgood	Voice role; episode: "The Last Crusade"
2019	Supergirl	Edna	Episode: "American Dreamer"
2020	Riverdale	Miss Appleyard	Episode: "Chapter Sixty-Seven: Varsity Blues"
2020	Project Blue Book	Judy Newbold	Episodes: "The Roswell Incident (Parts 1 & 2)"
2021	Two Sentence Horror Stories	Jen Spencer	Episode: "Imposter"
2021	A Picture Perfect Wedding	Lindsey Morrison	Television film
2021	Doomsday Mom	Lanie	Television film
2021	A Kindhearted Christmas	Kylie Monroe	Television film
2021–2022	Johnny Test	Mary Test	Main voice role
2022	Planning on Forever	Emma	Television film
2023	Holiday Hotline	Abby	Hallmark Channel television film
2024	All I Need for Christmas	Piper	Hallmark Mystery television film
2026	A Season to Bloom	Elise	Television film
