= Rufus (film) =

- Film poster
- Directed by: Dave Schultz
- Written by: Dave Schultz
- Produced by: Bruce Harvey; Anand Ramayya; Dave Schulz
- Starring: Rory J. Saper; Kim Coates; David James Elliott; Kelly Rowan; Merritt Patterson; Richard Harmon
- Cinematography: Craig Wrobleski
- Edited by: Ken Filewych
- Music by: Erland and the Carnival
- Production companies: Lonely Boy Productions; Karma Films
- Distributed by: Entertainment One
- Release date: 21 September 2012 (Calgary)
- Running time: 109 minutes
- Country: Canada
- Language: English

Rufus (also known as Hunted) a Canadian horror film, directed by Dave Schultz and released in 2012. The film stars Rory J. Saper as Rufus, a mysterious young man who turns up in a small town in Saskatchewan and is eventually revealed to be a vampire. The cast also includes David James Elliott, Kelly Rowan, Merritt Patterson, Richard Harmon, and Kim Coates.

The film premiered at the Calgary International Film Festival in September 2012, before going into general theatrical release in 2013.

== Plot ==
Rufus is a mysterious young boy who arrives in a small town in Saskatchewan with an elderly woman. Saying she can go no further, the elderly woman commits suicide by walking in front of a tractor trailer. Hugh Wade, the town sheriff and his wife Jennifer, take him in as their house guest as Sheriff Wade attempts to find out who Rufus and the elderly woman really are and why they suddenly arrived in town. Tracy and Clay are two local teenagers who quickly befriend Rufus. Aaron Van Dusen is a mysterious man who arrives in town looking for Rufus for unknown reasons.

== Cast ==
- Rory J. Saper as Rufus
- Merritt Patterson as Tracy
- David James Elliott as Hugh Wade
- Kelly Rowan as Jennifer Wade
- Richard Harmon as Clay
- Kim Coates as Aaron Van Dusen
- Tom Carey as Chet
- Nancy Sorel as Vickie
- Christina Jastrzembska as Louise Kettle

== Reception ==
On Rotten Tomatoes the film has an approval rating of 33% based on 6 reviews.

Adam Nayman of the Globe and Mail was critical of the film, saying it "ends up feeling drab as well as looking it." Jay Stone of Canada.com was critical of the slow pace of the film and wrote: "Writer/director Dave Schultz stretches out this somewhat languorous - not to say somnambulant - material to almost two hours by adding a villain."

Bruce DeMara of the Toronto Star gave the film 4 out of 4 and was positive about the slowly building tension and the performances of the actors: "Schultz allows the tension to build slowly and for Rufus's secret history to be revealed in increments. There's also some great interplay between the actors".

== Accolades ==
Erland and the Carnival received two Canadian Screen Award nominations for Best Original Song at the 1st Canadian Screen Awards, for the songs "Wanting" and "Out of Sight".
