= Coyotes (film) =

2025 film by Colin Minihan

- Theatrical release poster
- Directed by: Colin Minihan
- Screenplay by: Tad Daggerhart; Nick Simon
- Story by: Nick Simon; Daniel Meersand; Tad Daggerhart
- Produced by: Nathan Klingher; Ford Corbett; Joshuah Harris; Jib Polhemus
- Starring: Justin Long; Kate Bosworth; Mila Harris; Katherine McNamara; Brittany Allen; Keir O'Donnell; Norbert Leo Butz
- Cinematography: Bradley Stuckel
- Edited by: Colin Minihan
- Music by: Brittany Allen
- Production companies: Captone Studios; Gramercy Park Media; Source Management Production
- Distributed by: Aura Entertainment
- Release dates: September 20, 2025 (Fantastic Fest); October 3, 2025
- Running time: 92 minutes
- Country: United States
- Language: English

Coyotes is a 2025 American comedy-horror thriller film directed and edited by Colin Minihan. It stars Justin Long, Kate Bosworth, Mila Harris, Katherine McNamara, Brittany Allen, Keir O'Donnell, and Norbert Leo Butz. It had its world premiere at Fantastic Fest on September 20, 2025, before a theatrical release on October 3, 2025.

== Premise ==
The film is about a "family who must fight for their lives while trapped in their Hollywood Hills home as a pack of coyotes targets them".

== Cast ==
- Justin Long as Scott, Liv's husband
- Kate Bosworth as Liv, Scott's wife
- Mila Harris as Chloe, Scott and Liv's teenage daughter
- Katherine McNamara as Kat, a social media influencer
- Brittany Allen as Julie, Trip's hired sex worker
- Keir O'Donnell as an exterminator
- Norbert Leo Butz as Trip, Scott's neighbor
- Kevin Glynn as Tony, Scott's best friend and neighbor
- Norma Nivia as Sheila, Tony's wife

== Production ==
Coyotes was directed by Colin Minihan from a screenplay by Tad Daggerhart and Nick Simon, and story by Simon, Daggerhart, and Daniel Meers. It was produced by Captone Studios, Nathan Klingher, Ford Corbett, and Joshua Harris for Gramercy Park Media, and Jib Polhemus for Source Management and Production. Funding was done by Magnetic Labs. Real-life couple Justin Long and Kate Bosworth were cast in the leading roles. Long initially declined the script due to his involvement with the short film Fur Babies for the horror anthology V/H/S/Beyond (2024). After Bosworth read the script, she encouraged him to reconsider it as a potential starring role. Mila Harris, Katherine McNamara, Brittany Allen, Keir O'Donnell, and Norbert Leo Butz co-star. Allen also composed the score.

Financed by Capstone Studios and Magnetic Labs, principal photography took place between November and December 2024 in Bogotá, Colombia.

== Release ==
In August 2025, Aura Entertainment acquired the U.S. distribution rights and released it on October 3, 2025. It had its world premiere at Fantastic Fest on September 20, 2025. The U.K. and Ireland rights were secured by Signature Entertainment.

== Reception ==
On the review aggregator website Rotten Tomatoes, 59% of 58 critics' reviews are positive. The website's consensus reads: "Not exactly the alpha of the pack, what Coyotes lacks in bark it makes up for in its unique blend of comedic thrills."

William Bibbiani of The Wrap considered the film a "failed opportunity", noting that while the explanation for the coyote attacks was coherent, the lack of a stronger thematic connection made the narrative feel "arbitrary". He wrote, "Still, Colin Minihan knows how to make a gnarly horror film".

RogerEbert.com's Brian Tallerico awarded the film a score of two out of four, describing it a missed opportunity. He criticized the depiction of the coyotes, suggesting they appeared to be created by A.I. software. He wrote, "They don't move in a normal, threatening way, never really looking like they're sharing the same space with the characters. If you're willing to overlook the "fake-otes" and the occasionally lame stabs at humor, there are some memorable deaths in Coyotes, and likable enough performances from most of the ensemble".
