= Thomas Edison Film Festival =

Annual film competition and film festival

The Thomas Edison Film Festival (TEFF) is an annual international juried film competition and traveling film festival established in 1981. The festival focuses exclusively on short films from different genres including animation, documentary, experimental, narrative, and screen dance. Based in Hudson County, New Jersey, the festival shows work across the United States and abroad.

== History ==
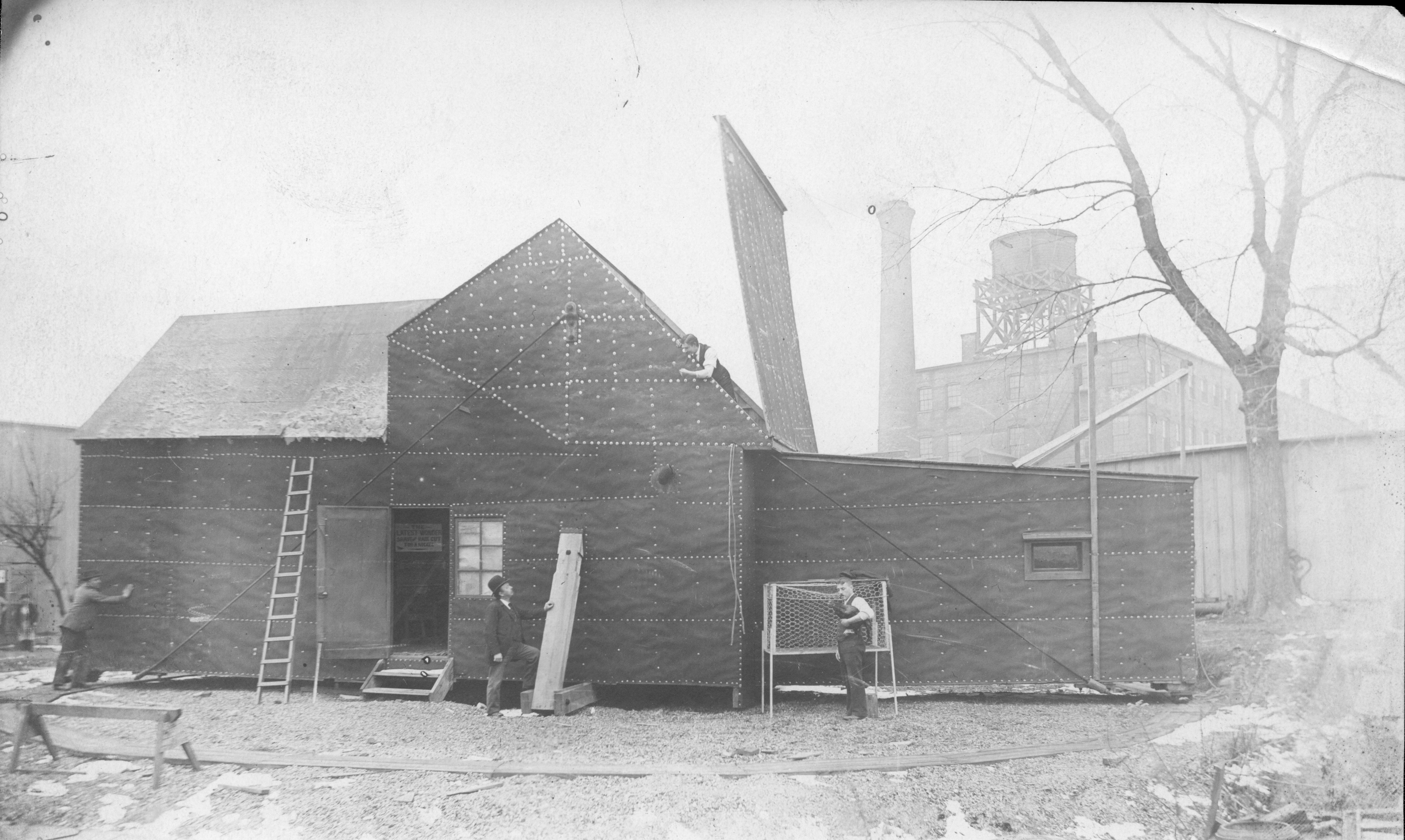
Edison's Black Maria

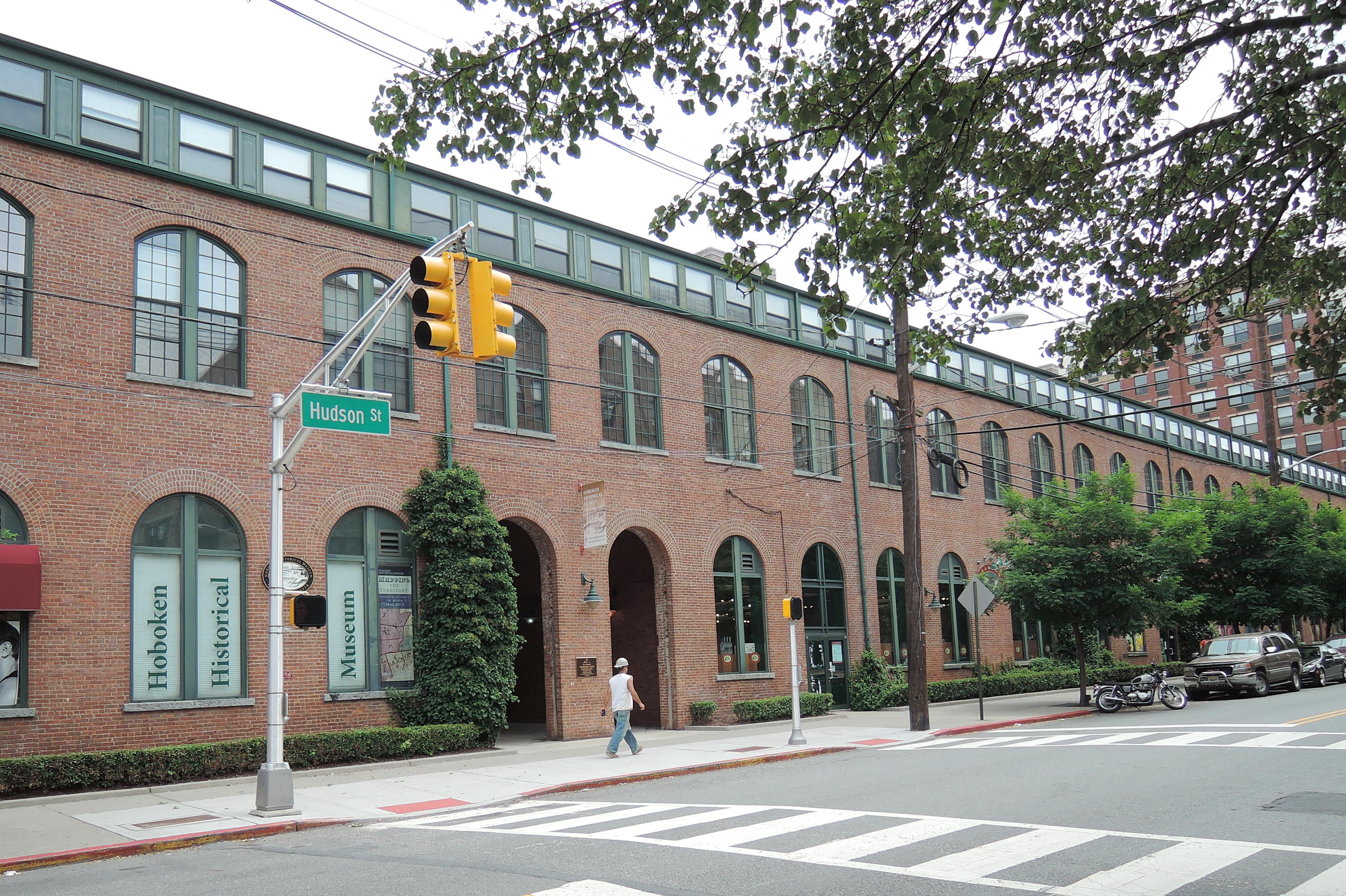
The Hoboken Historical Museum hosts and is a venue for the TEFF

The festival was originally known as the Black Maria Film Festival. Its name was tribute to Thomas Edison’s development of the motion picture at his laboratory complex (now Thomas Edison National Historical Park, in West Orange, New Jersey), which was the site of the world's first film studio, erected in 1893 and dubbed the Black Maria.

The TEFF was founded in 1981 by John Columbus. It is a project of the Thomas A. Edison Media Arts Consortium, an independent non-profit organization originally based at Department of Media Arts at New Jersey City University in Jersey City, New Jersey. The consortium has since shifted operations to the Hoboken Historical Museum in Hoboken, New Jersey. The Consortium and the Thomas Edison Film Festival has been led by director, Jane Steuerwald since 2013.

The festival changed its name to the Thomas Edison Film Festival in 2021.

Films shown at the 2025 event included A Better Place, The Professional Parent, The Insides of our Lives.

== Format ==
The Thomas Edison Film Festival (TEFF) is an Academy Awards Qualifying Film Festival for animation and experimental short films. Unlike most film festivals, TEFF is not presented in only one location or on a specific date. Following a juried competition, films are shown year-round at universities, museums, libraries, and cultural centers across the United States and abroad. Many films address environmental and social concerns such as climate change, sustainability, public health, substance abuse, gun violence, immigration, people with disabilities, and LGBTQ topics.

== See also ==
- List of film festivals in New Jersey
- List of film festivals in the United States
