= Spiral (2019 film) =

2019 film directed by Kurtis David Harder

- Film poster
- Directed by: Kurtis David Harder
- Written by: Colin Minihan; John Poliquin
- Produced by: Chris Ball; Kurtis David Harder; Colin Minihan; John Poliquin
- Starring: Jeffrey Bowyer-Chapman; Ari Cohen; Lochlyn Munro; Chandra West; Ty Wood
- Cinematography: Bradley Stuckel
- Edited by: Kurtis David Harder; Colin Minihan
- Music by: Avery Kentis
- Production companies: Digital Interference Productions; Hadron Films
- Release date: August 25, 2019 (Arrow Video Frightfest)
- Running time: 90 minutes
- Country: Canada
- Language: English

Spiral is a 2019 Canadian horror thriller film directed by Kurtis David Harder. It stars Jeffrey Bowyer-Chapman and Ari Cohen as Malik and Aaron, respectively, a same-sex couple who move to a small town with their daughter Kayla (June Laporte), only to suspect that their initial welcome from their neighbors Marshall (Lochlyn Munro) and Tiffany (Chandra West) may conceal something sinister.

It premiered August 25, 2019 at Arrow Video Frightfest, and was screened at other horror and LGBTQ film festivals through late 2019 and early 2020. It premiered on Shudder in September 2020.

== Plot ==
On December 12, 1983, teenagers Malik and Liam make out in a car when a group of men suddenly appear and brutally attack them.

On November 7, 1995, Malik, his partner, Aaron, and Aaron’s teenage daughter, Kayla, moves into a new home in a small town to begin a new life as a family. During the first night in their home, Malik hears strange noises, and a mysterious, hooded person watches them from afar. Malik bonds with Kayla and tries to adjust to life in the new house, but he is plagued with traumatic flashbacks of the attack he suffered as a teenager.

Aaron and Malik meet one of their neighbors, Tiffany, who presents them with a housewarming gift. Malik returns home later and sees a homophobic slur spray painted on the wall. He paints over it and does not tell Aaron what happened. Malik and Aaron attend a bonfire party with the other residents, including Tiffany and her husband, Marshall. Malik sees Mr. Rinehart, who lives across the street, staring at him from a distance before disappearing. Mr. Rinehart tries to break into their house later that night and gives Malik a piece of paper, informing him not to show it to anyone. Malik watches Mr. Rinehart’s house and sees him, as well other neighbors, performing a ritual in a circle. The following morning, Mr. Rinehart is discovered dead in his home by his grandson, Matthew, in an apparent suicide. Malik becomes increasingly suspicious and distrustful of the neighbors while Aaron tries to fit in with them.

Kayla tells Malik and Aaron she has found a part-time job, but she secretly spends her time hanging out with Tiffany and Marshall’s teenage son, Tyler.

Malik begins experiencing a series of hallucinations and nightmares. He discovers the paper Mr. Rinehart gave him has a series of numerical dates and, after researching, learns that a same-sex couple was the victim of a murder-suicide in the same neighborhood in 1985. He finds an abandoned house, and an apparition appears and gives him a handful of video tapes.

He tries to convince Aaron that they need to leave the town, but Aaron believes Malik is struggling with paranoia as a result of his past. Tensions between them increase, and Aaron kicks Malik out of the house after finding photos of him and Matthew having sex to which Malik denies.

Malik stays in the abandoned house and watches one of the tapes, which contains home movie footage of the same-sex couple from 1985. The tape reveals they experienced similar disturbing events prior to their deaths. Malik learns that every 10 years, the neighbors perform a ritual and select a new family in the neighborhood to target. He returns home to warn Aaron and Kayla but is horrified to see all of the residents have assembled for a gathering. Believing Marshall to the leader of the rituals, he shoots him to death, and it is revealed that a party was seemingly being thrown in their honor.

Malik is arrested, and Aaron visits him in jail to inform him that he and Kayla are moving to get away from him. Aaron later discovers the video tape from 1985 and sees footage of Marshall, Tiffany, and Tyler socializing with the couple and their daughter. Suddenly, a group of hooded figures appear in the house, and Aaron discovers Tyler eating the intestines of Kayla’s body. Meanwhile, Marshall, now-alive, visits Malik and tells him that Aaron and Kayla will be murdered, and he will be framed and appear to have committed suicide. Marshall explains that the neighborhood has a history of eliminating newcoming families who represent society’s fear of a progressive culture.

It is revealed that Malik documented all of the events and downloaded the information onto a CD-ROM to warn the next family. Ten years later, a South Asian couple and their daughter moves into the house, and the daughter finds the CD-ROM hidden in the attic.

== Production ==
Spiral was filmed during a 21-day period in 2018, in one of Alberta's small towns (Irricana), on a relatively low budget.

== Critical reception ==
The movie received generally positive reviews. On review aggregator Rotten Tomatoes, it has an approval rating of 74% based on 46 reviews, with an average rating of 6.6/10. The website's critical consensus reads: "Spiral explores the tension between otherness and conformity with a well-acted horror story that chills even if it doesn't outright terrify." Phil Wheat of Nerdly called it "an interesting look into the pressure of being minority" and believed that Bowyer-Chapman's performance was "the very epitome of tour-de-force." His Name is Death editor Albert Nowicki praised the movie for its undertones and subtextual plot and applauded Harder for "finally giving gay characters the right to speak and tell their stories." He also stated the movie is "brave" and has "a lot of empathy."

== Awards and nominations ==
Year	Award	Category	Recipient(s)	Result	Ref.
2020	Leo Awards	Best Cinematography in a Motion Picture	Bradley Stuckel	Nominated	
2019	Other Worlds Austin SciFi Film Festival	Dan O'Bannon Under Worlds Best Feature	Kurtis David Harder	Won	
2021	HNiD Awards	Best Screenplay	Colin Minihan, John Poliquin	3rd place	
2021	HNiD Awards	Best Actor	Jeffrey Bowyer-Chapman	Write-in	
2021	HNiD Awards	Most Underappreciated Movie of a Year	—N/a	Runner-up	
2021	HNiD Awards	Best Movie on Demand (VOD release)	—N/a	3rd place (Note: Ex-aequo with Nobody Sleeps in the Woods Tonight.)	
