= It Stains the Sands Red =

2016 horror film directed by Colin Minihan

- Directed by: Colin Minihan
- Written by: Colin Minihan; Stuart Ortiz
- Produced by: Brandon Christensen; Bic Tran; Colin Minihan; Stuart Ortiz
- Starring: Brittany Allen; Merwin Mondesir; Juan Riedinger
- Cinematography: Clayton Moore
- Music by: Blitz//Berlin
- Distributed by: Dark Sky Films
- Release date: October 8, 2016
- Running time: 92 minutes
- Countries: Canada; United States
- Language: English
- Box office: $3,599

It Stains the Sands Red is a 2016 Canadian-American horror film directed by Colin Minihan. It stars Brittany Allen as a woman relentlessly pursued through the desert outside of Las Vegas by a single zombie.

== Plot ==
During a zombie apocalypse, Las Vegas residents Molly and Nick are on their way to meet up with some friends at a remote airfield to catch a plane ride out of the country. They encounter a lone zombie as their car gets stuck in the sand. After Nick unsuccessfully tries to kill the zombie with his gun, they are trapped while the zombie tries its best to get inside. Nick decides to wait for the zombie to lose interest, and when it suddenly disappears, they both get out of the car to find the cellphone that Nick dropped before. They need it to stay in contact with Jimmy, who is waiting for them at an airfield. The zombie suddenly reappears out of the night and kills Nick, forcing Molly to take whatever she can from the car and make out across the desert on foot while being pursued by the slow-moving but persistent zombie.

Molly comes across an abandoned house, where she temporarily takes refuge. The zombie follows her to the house, but she evades it. After leaving the house, the zombie starts pursuing her again. She realizes the zombie will never catch her if she keeps up a good pace. She starts taunting then talking with the zombie, which she names "Smalls", and reveals that she was using Nick to get to Mexico. A sandstorm hits from out of nowhere, and Molly is knocked unconscious.

After Molly regains consciousness, she encounters two men, Ted and Jason, who give her water to drink and put her in their air-conditioned truck while they help look for her bag, which she lost in the sandstorm. She becomes uncomfortable and decides to leave when she notices that the men are driving a truck that is not theirs and have probably killed the father and son who owned it (their photo is in the vehicle, and Jason is wearing the boys' baseball cap). Still, the two men threaten to kill her unless she gives them the location of the airfield where she was headed, which she does. Ted decides to rape Molly, and is busy doing so when Smalls recovers and kills him, and Jason drives away.

Molly and Smalls continue on foot, and later Molly establishes some ground rules about him not biting her, which he seems to understand and go along with. At the campfire that evening, Molly reveals that she has a young son, Chase. They made tin can telephones to communicate, and the last time she saw him, she took her can with her so that they could stay in contact. She still has it in her bag.

The next morning, they're traveling to the airfield when Molly and Smalls encounter a convoy of soldiers. Two soldiers remain behind when they think they spotted something, and Molly unsuccessfully tries to hide Smalls from them, but he staggers onto the road. She shields him and leads them to believe he is her husband to protect him. The soldiers begin to leave, but then one shoots the zombie in the leg. It bites Molly's finger, and she is forced to use a large rock to amputate it before the infection spreads. Molly puts Smalls into the small inflatable raft that he's been pulling with her supplies in it, and begins to pull him down the highway towards the airfield, with her finger bleeding profusely. When Smalls falls out, she is forced to kill him with a rock, as he is too weak to travel, and she doesn't want to abandon him. She takes his wallet and sees who he was in life and that he was probably married.

Molly makes it to the airfield, where she meets Jimmy, Nick's friend, after he fires at her with his rifle because he's freaked out (some of his guys have become zombies and are locked up) and high on cocaine. They get the plane working and prepare to travel to Mexico, but Molly stays behind. She calls her sister Ali, but learns that her son Chase, who was living with Ali and her husband, Blake, has been hiding in their house for several days. Molly decides to rescue Chase, first having to kill a few zombies to retrieve from one of their persons the keys to a convertible that she'll need for her drive back to Las Vegas.

Molly makes it to the suburb where Chase lives and finds it deserted, but with the remnants of much violence and chaos having unfolded. Upon arriving at their house, Ali and Blake are dead, but Molly searches upstairs and eventually finds Chase safe and unharmed. She promises never to leave him again and to protect him always. As they leave, several zombies break into the house, and Molly shields Chase and begins to wield a large shovel to fight their way through.

== Cast ==
- Brittany Allen as Molly
- Merwin Mondesir as Nick
- Juan Riedinger as Smalls
- Kristopher Higgins as Ted
- Andrew Supanz as Jason
- Dylan Playfair as Robbie
- Warren E Thomas as Soldier 1
- Steve Judkins as Soldier 2

== Production ==
Filming took place at Valley of Fire State Park in Nevada.

== Release ==
The film had its world premiere at the Sitges Film Festival in October 2016. It was also screened at the 2017 LA Film Festival.

It began a limited theatrical release on July 28, 2017.

== Critical reception ==
On the review aggregator website Rotten Tomatoes, 67% of 15 critics' reviews are positive, with an average rating of 7.4/10.

Dennis Harvey of Variety praised Allen's performance, and wrote, "Watchable if never really scary or funny enough to leave a memorable impression, this middling endeavor should nonetheless pull in a fair number of home-viewing horror fans with its offbeat theme and lurid title." Rob Staeger of LA Weekly wrote, "what could have been a wordless slog is inventive and even buoyant".

John DeFore of The Hollywood Reporter wrote, "Genre fans will likely have a hard time coming to terms with this tonally confused and sometimes grating film, whose commercial prospects are limited despite the appeals it makes to some underserved audiences".
