= Hunting Matthew Nichols =

2024 film by Markian Tarasiuk

- American theatrical release poster
- Directed by: Markian Tarasiuk
- Written by: Sean Harris Oliver; Markian Tarasiuk
- Produced by: Matt Villeneuve; Lucy McNulty
- Starring: Miranda MacDougall; Markian Tarasiuk; Ryan Alexander McDonald; Christine Willes
- Cinematography: Justin Sebastian
- Edited by: Jonathan Mathew
- Music by: Jeff Griffiths and Christopher King
- Distributed by: DeVuono Releasing
- Release dates: October 19, 2024 (NBFF); April 10, 2026 (North America)
- Running time: 89 minutes
- Country: Canada
- Language: English
- Budget: $275,000
- Box office: $710,532

Hunting Matthew Nichols is a 2024 Canadian supernatural horror film written, directed, and starring Markian Tarasiuk in his directorial debut. It has elements of a "found footage" documentary in which filmmakers explore a decades-long, unsolved disappearance. A sequel is currently in development.

== Plot ==
On October 31, 2001, teenager Matthew Nichols and his best friend, Jordan Reimer, disappeared in the woods of Vancouver Island.

In 2023, Matthew's younger sister, Tara, begins working on a documentary film with director Markian Tarasiuk in an attempt to come to a resolution regarding the unsolved disappearances. Tara, Markian, and his cinematographer Ryan McDonald, return to Vancouver Island and interview her mother, alongside several other individuals, including Pam Hamilton, a lead investigator on Matthew and Jordan's case.

During interviews, Pam expresses the belief that Matthew and Jordan became lost in the woods and fell into a ravine or river, and both died. The only evidence discovered in the case was a camcorder belonging to Matthew which was found in an abandoned cabin that was alleged to have been built by a local religious leader from decades before, who led a small commune in the woods.

After poring through evidence released to the Nichols family by the local police department, Tara deduces that one of the mini DV tapes admitted into the police file is missing. A month later, Tara is able to obtain it from the authorities. Upon watching the tape, Tara, Markian, and Ryan find it to contain disturbing footage of Matthew and Jordan engaging in what appears to be a Satanic occult ritual, which culminates in Matthew violently murdering Jordan by strangling him and gouging out his eyes with his fingers. After viewing the tape, a distraught Tara walks into the ocean and nearly drowns herself, resulting in Markian suggesting they abort their documentary.

Tara and Markian visit Jordan's father, who reluctantly gives them an antique grimoire Matthew and Jordan stole from the local library. Next, Tara confronts Pam, accusing her of concealing the existence of the tape as well as an animal skull totem which was also found at the cabin. Pam claims the police department chose to keep the tape from the public to avoid a mass hysteria, believing it to be an amateur short horror film Matthew and Jordan shot, inspired by The Blair Witch Project.

Despite Pam's claim that authorities razed the cabin, Tara insists on exploring the area, with Markian reluctantly agreeing to accompany her. While camping in the woods, Tara awakens Markian in the middle of the night, bringing him to the cabin, which she discovered is inexplicably adjacent to their campsite. Using a necklace gifted to her by Matthew as a pendulum, along with the skull totem, Tara seems to communicate with an entity claiming to be Matthew. Moments later, she is forcefully dragged outside by an unseen force. Markian flees after Tara, finding her distraught and stating that the being she was communicating with is in fact not Matthew. The two are attacked by unseen entities, before Markian finds a nude Tara standing at the base of a tree, where multiple nude human figures are fixed above. The figures descend the tree and attack Markian.

In a mid-credits sequence, a disfigured Markian is visited in the hospital by Ryan. When Ryan approaches him, Markian begins screaming and violently convulsing.

== Cast ==
- Miranda MacDougall as Tara Nichols
  - Bianca Stein as young Tara
- Markian Tarasiuk as himself
- Ryan Alexander McDonald as himself
- Christine Willes as Pam Hamilton
- Susinn McFarlen as Brenda Nichols
- James Ross as Matthew Nichols
- Issiah Bullbear as Jordan Reimer
- Trevor Carroll as Mitchell Reimer
- Joe Costa as Dr. Ian Leserge
- Jay Hindle as Randall Nichols
- Lucy McNulty as Gabrielle Jones
- Bernard Cuffling as Ken Crawford

Additionally, Sean Harris Oliver provides the voice of a 911 operator.

== Production ==
=== Development ===
Tarasiuk was inspired by true crime documentaries on Netflix "as a satire to some degree" and myths around the world involving "forest creatures." The film was inspired by The Blair Witch Project and The Ring.

=== Filming ===
Principal photography lasted for 12 days in December 2023 on Vancouver Island on a budget of $275,000 to capture a gray, rainy, dark tone and sense of dread.

== Release ==
The film premiered at the 2024 Newport Beach Film Festival, and also screened in the Borsos Competition at the 2024 Whistler Film Festival, as well as Nightmares Film Fest, FilmQuest and Blood in the Snow Canadian Film Festival. UK sales outfit Amp International acquired worldwide sales rights in October 2024. The film was released in North America on April 10, 2026.

The marketing includes "THE HUNT," a website with “case-file evidence” and other extras adding to the central story.

== Reception ==
=== Awards and nominations ===
Event (year)	Award	Recipient	Result	Ref.
FilmQuest (2024)	Best Found Footage Feature	Markian Tarasiuk, Lucy McNulty, Sean Harris Oliver, Matt Villeneuve	Won	
FilmQuest (2024)	Best Editing	Jonathan Mathew	Won	
FilmQuest (2024)	Best Actress	Miranda MacDougall	Nominated	
FilmQuest (2024)	Best Supporting Actor	Markian Tarasiuk	Nominated	
Nightmares Film Fest (2024)	Best Thriller Feature	Markian Tarasiuk, Lucy McNulty, Sean Harris Oliver, Matt Villeneuve	Nominated	
Nightmares Film Fest (2024)	Best Lead Performance	Miranda MacDougall	Nominated	
Nightmares Film Fest (2024)	Best Writing	Sean Harris Oliver	Nominated	
Whistler Film Festival (2024)	Best Canadian Feature	Markian Tarasiuk	Nominated	
Blood in the Snow Canadian Film Festival (2024)	Best Director	Markian Tarasiuk	Won	
Blood in the Snow Canadian Film Festival (2024)	Best Lead Acting	Miranda MacDougall	Nominated	
Blood in the Snow Canadian Film Festival (2024)	Best Feature Film	Markian Tarasiuk, Lucy McNulty, Sean Harris Oliver, Matt Villeneuve	Nominated	

== See also ==
- List of ghost films
