= Strange Harvest (film) =

2024 film by Stuart Ortiz

- Theatrical release poster
- Directed by: Stuart Ortiz
- Written by: Stuart Ortiz
- Produced by: Bruce Guido; Stuart Ortiz; Alex Yesilcimen
- Starring: Peter Zizzo; Terri Apple; Andy Lauer; Matthew Peschio; Janna Cardia; Travis Wolfe Sr.; Christina Helene Braa
- Cinematography: Seth Fulleer
- Edited by: Stuart Ortiz
- Music by: Sarah Decourcy
- Production companies: Adorable Damage; Pathogen Pictures
- Distributed by: Roadside Attractions; Saban Films
- Release dates: September 22, 2024 (Fantastic Fest); August 8, 2025 (United States)
- Running time: 95 minutes
- Country: United States
- Language: English
- Box office: $391,173

Strange Harvest (Note: Released in festivals as Strange Harvest: Occult Murder in the Inland Empire) is a 2024 American mockumentary horror film directed, written, produced, and edited by Stuart Ortiz. Set in the Inland Empire region of Southern California, the film centers around a detective pair on the trail of a serial killer called Mr. Shiny who, after reappearing from a nearly 20-year absence, leaves cryptic clues at the crime scenes. The cast includes Peter Zizzo, Terri Apple, Andy Lauer, Matthew Peschio, Janna Cardia, Travis Wolfe Sr., and Christina Helene Braa.

It premiered at the 2024 Fantastic Fest, before releasing in the United States on August 8, 2025 by Roadside Attractions and Saban Films. Strange Harvest received largely favorable reviews from film critics, and has grossed $391,173 at the U.S. box office.

== Plot ==
Detectives Joe Kirby and Lexi Taylor recount their time working the case of "Mr. Shiny," an elusive serial killer who committed a string of murders over three decades in California's Inland Empire. The first victim, a young woman, is found dismembered in the San Bernardino National Forest in 1993. Shortly after, a bedridden elderly man is bludgeoned and stabbed to death in his retirement facility. A third victim, a young boy named Noah Lafone, is abducted and found murdered in a bog with his liver removed. At the time, the three crimes are not assumed to be connected.

In July 2010, the Sheridan family are murdered in their home, bound at the dining room table and exsanguinated via cuts to their femoral arteries. The victims' blood is used to paint a strange symbol on the vaulted ceiling of the house. The killer subsequently murders a young woman in her home before burning her boyfriend Glen's face with a blowtorch, severely disfiguring him. Another male victim is found in an abandoned swimming pool which has been half-filled with water and leeches, which slowly exsanguinated him over several days; barbed wire surrounding the pool edges prevented the man from escaping. Tracing the victim's computer history, Kirby and Taylor deduce that the killer contacted the victim on the internet using public Wi-Fi at a coffee shop. At the coffee shop, they meet a homeless man who had a close encounter with the killer, who was driving a stolen van. The owner of the van, Victor Shamaz, is considered a suspect initially, but claims the vehicle was stolen by a man wearing a strange mask who assaulted him.

Kirby and Taylor eventually trace the killer, whose real name is Leslie Sykes, to a house he has rented for a year, but find it mostly empty. The same symbol painted in blood at the Sheridan crime scene is found etched above the home's front door. Meanwhile, Sykes taunts police with recurring letters that make oblique references to "Kaliban" and other occult phenomenon. Kirby and Taylor learn that, during his twenty-year absence from California, Sykes had moved to Jerusalem before traveling through several Middle Eastern and European countries, studying ancient sites and occult practices.

A short time later, teenager Victoria Macenroe is shot by Sykes in her home, who uses lipstick to draw the same symbol on her bedroom wall. She survives the shooting, which was caught live on webcam, and is hospitalized. Kirby and Taylor, along with other protective officers, stake out the hospital, but Sykes manages to infiltrate it posing as a nurse, and kills Victoria by adding drain cleaner to her blood transfusion bag. Next, Sykes murders an employee at a doughnut shop, removing his heart. Saroj Mallick, a security guard, encounters Sykes but fails to capture him. Mallick is later found dead, strung up in a local playground, executed via the "blood eagle," an ancient form of ritual murder. In a storage unit rented by Sykes, various organs from victims are found, as well as occult-like books and a statue of a leech-like creature.

After questioning a rare acquaintance of Sykes, Kirby and Taylor learn that Sykes claimed to have had a spiritual experience in the early 1990s after entering a strange cave in the desert. It is surmised that Sykes's killing spree has been orchestrated to culminate during a looming rare planetary occurrence that happens every 800 years. Sykes subsequently kills a young couple in their home before kidnapping their infant son. Kirby and Taylor trace Sykes to the San Bernardino National Forest, where they eventually find him attempting to burn the child to death in a ritualistic pyre at the time of the planetary alignment, but they stop him short of carrying it out, fatally shooting him. The police and campers in the forest witness a strange light beaming in the sky that night, which they cannot explain.

Kirby and Taylor reflect on Sykes' murders, but are wary of attributing any supernatural or cosmic elements to it. A letter mailed to Kirby and Taylor two days before Sykes's death indicates he will return again in 800 years to carry out his mission. In a post-credits scene, Kirby is seen via footage recorded on his cell phone, searching for the cave where Sykes claimed to have had his supernatural experience.

== Cast ==
- Peter Zizzo as Det. Joe Kirby
- Terri Apple as Det. Alexis "Lexi" Taylor
- Andy Lauer as Jared Kelly
- Matthew Peschio as Victor Shamaz
- Allen Marsh as Jonas Eckhard
- Roy Abramsohn as Prof. Warren Gilette
- Christina Hélène Braa as Lizzy
- Janna Cardia as Kacie Porter
- Jessee J. Clarkson as Leslie Sykes, "Mr. Shiny"
- David Hemphill as Glen Sandweiss
- Nicole Dionne as Sonia Lafone
- Brandon Christensen as Noah Lafone
- Dawsyn Eubanks as Victoria Macenroe
- Coleen Tutton as April Macenroe
- Heath Harper as Jim Macenroe
- Matthew M. Garcia as Saroj Mallick
- Michael Karan as Jim Lafone
- Ross Turner as Dr. Dennis Levine

== Production ==
Ortiz came up with the idea for Strange Harvest after seeing the rise in popularity of the Netflix miniseries Tiger King, noting the public's interest in true crime and that "Tiger King at the core is a true crime story, even though it's so absurd and has a lot of comedic elements." While writing the script Ortiz wanted the film to retain as much of the traditional documentary format as possible, as he "wanted to do something that just kind of captured the essence of a modern documentary." Ortiz also drew upon H.P. Lovecraft as an inspiration, including the "Mr. Shiny" name as a reference to a Lovecraft character, as well as True Detective season one, The Silence of the Lambs, the Zodiac Killer, and Stephen King.

Actors Peter Zizzo and Terri Apple were brought on to portray two of the film's central characters. In an interview with Bleeding Cool, Zizzo stated that he viewed episodes of Detective Joe Kenda's show on Discovery+ to prepare for the character, as Ortiz wanted the detectives to feel realistic. During filming Ortiz experienced some challenges due to the different formats needed for the mockumentary format; some of the shots were also ruined by the filming location used for interviews. Ortiz used a large warehouse for this and was occasionally interrupted by random sounds from outside the building.

Ortiz has stated the possibility of more films in a "shared world," suggested by the film's post-credits sequence.

== Release ==
The film had its world premiere at Fantastic Fest on September 22, 2024, under the title Strange Harvest: Occult Murder in the Inland Empire. Further festival premieres followed at Grimmfest, Strasbourg European Fantastic Film Festival, FilmQuest and Panic Fest.

In April 2025, Saban Films acquired North American rights to the film. The film was released in 770 theaters in the United States on August 8, 2025.

== Reception ==
=== Box office ===
In the United States and Canada, Strange Harvest opened alongside Weapons, Freakier Friday, and Sketch, and grossed $223,208, finishing 16th at the box office during the weekend of August 8–10.

=== Critical response ===
On the review aggregator website Rotten Tomatoes, 91% of 43 critics' reviews are positive. The website's consensus reads: "Getting the little details of true crime documentaries right before unleashing some truly unsettling twists, Strange Harvest reaps a bountiful crop of scares from its inventive structure." Metacritic, which uses a weighted average, assigned the film a score of 66 out of 100, based on 7 critics, indicating "generally favorable" reviews.

Collider rated the film favorably, drawing comparisons to The Blair Witch Project for its mockumentary style. Mary Beth McAndrews of Dread Central praised the film claiming it is “perhaps the best pseudo-documentary since Lake Mungo”, also drawing favorable comparisons to The Poughkeepsie Tapes. Peyton Robertson of RogerEbert.com awarded the film two and a half out of four stars, noting the film's special effects as inconsistent but conceding: "Aside from this, the storytelling and mockumentary style are pretty convincing. At times, it is easy to forget that what they’re watching is fiction, especially in found footage scenes, such as those via webcam, police body cams, or security cameras, where we see the actions of Mr. Shiny as they unfold. It’s deeply unsettling." Randy Myers of The Mercury News similarly observed that, "While the climax sputters a bit, the rest is taut and engrossing. As the dogged and tormented detectives Kirby and Apple, Peter Zizzo and Terri Apple feel like they walked right out of the cop shop. Ortiz knows the true-crime genre ever so well and gets every morbid detail right."

Erik Piepenburg of The New York Times wrote: "Things get too nutty in the final stretch with a turn toward occultism, something to do with Etruscan pottery and a serpent bearer constellation. But the film is naturalistic enough to be convincing and sick enough to be disturbing, even if the acting falls scattershot on the persuasiveness scale." Jim Vorel of Paste noted that, while he felt the film would have made for a better short subject, "it genuinely does an impeccable job of mimicking the format of so many true crime/serial killer documentaries." Dennis Harvey of Variety praised the film's narrative presentation, writing that it "cruises along like true-crime television fodder, complete with deftly faked news reports, man-on-the-street interviews, Zoom calls to relevant academics and explanatory motion graphics, along with stealthily slipped-in real stock images and footage... All the narrative and stylistic tropes of such poker-faced, typically small-screen fodder are faithfully reproduced. It’s a clever assembly that seldom tips its hand, with onscreen participants doing a fair job of not appearing to be professional actors."

=== Accolades ===
Institution	Year	Award	Recipient	Result	Ref.
FilmQuest	2024	Best Found Footage Feature	Stuart Ortiz	Nominated	
Los Angeles Crime and Horror Film Festival	2024	Best Film	Stuart Ortiz	Won	
Sherman Oaks Film Festival	2024	Best Feature Film - Horror	Strange Harvest	Nominated	
Sherman Oaks Film Festival	2024	Best Sound Design	Joe Barrucco	Won	
