= How Brief =

2026 Canadian short drama film

- Directed by: Kelly McCormack
- Written by: Tess Degenstein
- Produced by: Ariel Bond; Lucy McNulty; Jill Orsten
- Starring: Tatiana Maslany; Tess Degenstein; Susinn McFarlen; Gray Powell
- Cinematography: Alfonso Chin
- Edited by: Kane Stewart
- Production companies: Floyder Films; Strange Company Productions; Storiel Entertainment; Petite Mafia
- Release date: January 25, 2026 (Sundance Film Festival)
- Running time: 15 minutes
- Country: Canada
- Language: English

How Brief is a 2026 Canadian short drama film directed by Kelly McCormack and written by Tess Degenstein. The film had its world premiere at the 2026 Sundance Film Festival.

== Plot ==
Set over the course of one night in 1962, the film follows a restless woman who returns to her childhood home for the last time. Inspired by the music of singer-songwriter Connie Converse, it explores themes of disappearance, self-determination, and the choice to leave a life behind.

== Cast ==
- Tatiana Maslany
- Tess Degenstein
- Susinn McFarlen
- Jill Orsten

== Production ==
The film was written by Tess Degenstein and directed by Kelly McCormack. It was produced by Ariel Bond, Lucy McNulty, and Jill Orsten. Cinematography was handled by Alfonso Chin, with editing by Kane Stewart. The film runs approximately 15 minutes.

== Release ==
How Brief had its world premiere at the Sundance Film Festival in January 2026. It later screened at the Manchester Film Festival, Whistler Film Festival, Raindance Film Festival, and HollyShorts Film Festival.

== Reception ==
The film received positive reactions from some viewers on Letterboxd, with comments praising its theatrical style and emotional impact.

== Awards and nominations ==
Year	Award	Category	Recipient(s)	Result	Ref.
2026	Sundance Film Festival	Best Short Film	Kelly McCormack	Nominated	
2026	Galway Film Fleadh	Best International Short Fiction	Tess Degenstein, Ariel Bond, Kelly McCormack and Lucy McNulty	Nominated	
