= Josie Bissett =

American actress

- Born: Jolynn Christine Heutmaker; August 5, 1970 (age 56); Seattle, Washington, U.S.
- Education: Thomas Jefferson High School
- Occupations: Actress, model
- Years active: 1986 –present
- Spouses: Rob Estes (m. 1992, divorced) Thomas Doig (m. 2017)
- Children: 2

Jolynn Christine Heutmaker (born August 5, 1970), known professionally as Josie Bissett, is an American actress. She is known for her role as Jane Mancini on the television series Melrose Place (1992–1999), and for her television film appearances over the past three decades.

== Early life and career ==
Born in Seattle, Washington, on August 5, 1970, Bissett is the daughter of Linda A. (née Bissett) and Joseph E. Heutmaker. She attended Thomas Jefferson High School for two years, the second of which saw Josie lead the school's soccer team in scoring. In what would have been her junior year, Bissett was beginning her modelling career in Japan, much to relief of her mother, who just happened to coach the soccer team of Jefferson rival Decatur High.

Bissett's acting debut was in the 1989 Italian-American produced horror film Hitcher in the Dark. By that time, she had adopted her mother's maiden name as her stage name, after her original surname Heutmaker was found too difficult for agents to pronounce. In early 1990, Bissett played a recurring role on the sitcom The Hogan Family for two seasons. In 1992, she was cast as fashion designer Jane Andrews-Mancini on the prime time soap opera Melrose Place. Bissett remained with the series for five-and-a-half seasons until halfway through the 1996–97 season when she suffered a real-life miscarriage. She then took some time off from the series, but returned to the show in 1998 for its final season. In 2009–10, Bissett made guest appearances in two episodes of The CW's updated version of Melrose Place, reprising her role as Jane Andrews-Mancini.

She has made appearances in such projects as the telefilms The Fire Above and Dare to Love on ABC, Deadly Vows on FOX, Baby Monitor: Sound of Fear on USA, and I Do, They Don't on ABC Family. She has also made numerous guest-starring appearances, such as a 2003 appearance on NBC's Law & Order: Special Victims Unit. In 2008, she began a recurring role on the ABC Family TV series The Secret Life of the American Teenager. She starred in the Lifetime Television original film The Other Woman, based on the novel by Joy Fielding and directed by Jason Priestley. It debuted on June 28, 2008.

Bissett's feature film debut was in 1991, in Oliver Stone's The Doors, as the girlfriend of Doors' guitarist Robby Krieger. Her subsequent films include the coming-of-age comedy Book of Love and the psychological thriller Mikey.

Bissett has hosted television series on the topic of parenting, including Parenting & Beyond, which offered parents creative solutions to everyday problems. She also hosted the PBS educational special Teach More, Love More which follows four families, each with a child in a stage of early childhood development.

Bissett played Bobbi Gilbert (Tammy Petrin) in the 1994 television movie called Deadly Vows. The second wife, Tammy Petrin, was gunned down along with a co-worker at a Burger King in Woonsocket, Rhode Island in 1991. Angel Luis Valentin-Ramos, 38, of Framingham was arrested about 4 p.m. Sunday near the Ted Williams Tunnel in Boston. Ronald Harnois, a convicted bigamist serving a 20-year sentence for trying to kill his first wife with a car bomb, was charged in 1998 with the murder-for-hire of Petrin and her Burger King co-worker. Harnois was convicted in the murder of Petrin as well. He is now serving three life sentences for Petrin's murder on top of the 20-year sentence he got for attempting to kill his second wife.

She has appeared on several magazine covers, including TV Guide, Rolling Stone, Entertainment Weekly, Shape's Fit Pregnancy and New Woman.

Bissett has been the face of several national commercial campaigns, including Neutrogena's skin care line, Dr. Scholl's Pedicure Essentials, and Murad Skin Care.

She has also been the spokesperson of the 1997 Lee National Denim Day with the Lee Company. This was to help raise money for the fight against breast cancer and for the Susan G. Komen Breast Cancer Foundation.

She has co-edited two books, Little Bits Of Wisdom and Making Memories, which compile parenting stories and advice from parents around the world. She also authored a children's book, Tickle Monster, released in April 2008.

== Personal life ==
In 1992, Bissett married actor Rob Estes, who also starred on Melrose Place. The couple has two children together. They announced their plans to divorce in January 2006. in 2013, Bissett informed the Wall Street Journal that she was selling her long time Los Angeles residence and moving in with her fiancé Jeff Reed at their home on Lake Sammamish, located 30 miles east of Seattle. (Note: While such a person does indeed exist (i.e. one Jeff West, described in 2017 as "chief executive officer of Arrow Electonics,), there is no evidence that a marriage between the two ever materialized.)

Bissett resides in Seattle. She married Thomas Doig on July 4, 2017.

== Filmography ==
=== Film ===
Year	Title	Role	Notes
1989	Hitcher in the Dark	Daniela Foster	also known as Paura nel buio
1989	Desire	Jessica Harrison	as Josie Bisset
1990	Book of Love	Lilly	
1991	The Doors	Lynn Krieger	
1991	All-American Murder	Tally Fuller	Direct-to-video film
1992	Halfway House	Debbera "Debbie" Sutherland	
1992	Mikey	Jesse Owens	
2016	Operation Chromite	Jean MacArthur	

=== Television ===
Year	Title	Role	Notes
1990	Doogie Howser, M.D.	Crista Benson	Episode: "Attack of the Green-Eyed Monster"
1990	Quantum Leap	Becky	Episode: "Rebel Without a Clue – September 1, 1958"
1990–1991	The Hogan Family	Cara Eisenberg	Recurring role (seasons 5–6), 16 episodes
1991	Parker Lewis Can't Lose	Sarah	Episode: "Teens from a Mall"
1991	Posing: Inspired by Three Real Stories	Claire	Television movie; also known as I Posed for Playboy
1992	P.S. I Luv U	Dianne Peters/Lisa	Episode: "The Chameleon"
1992	Secrets	Gabby Smith	Television movie
1992	Burke's Law	Connie O'Neal	Episode: "Who Killed the Fashion King?"
1992–1997, 1998–1999	Melrose Place	Jane Andrews-Mancini	Main role (seasons 1–5, 7)
1994	Deadly Vows	Bobby Gilbert Weston	Television movie
1995	Dare to Love	Jessica Wells	Television movie
1998	Baby Monitor: Sound of Fear	Ann Lenz	Television movie
1999	The Sky's On Fire	Jennifer Thorne	Television movie
2003	Law & Order: Special Victims Unit	Jennifer Fulton	Episode: "Choice"
2005	I Do, They Don't	Carrie Lewalyon	Television movie
2006	Obituary	Denise Wilcox	Television movie
2008	Joy Fielding's The Other Woman	Jill Plumley	Television movie
2008–2013	The Secret Life of the American Teenager	Kathleen Bowman	Recurring role
2009–2010	Melrose Place	Jane Andrews	Episodes: "Vine ", "Santa Fe"
2013	Christmas with Tucker	Jill	Television movie
2014	Paper Angels	Lynn Brandt	Television movie
2015	A Mother's Instinct	Nora Betnner	Television movie
2016	Pregnant at 17	Sonia Clifton	Television movie
2016	The Wedding March	Olivia	Television movie (Hallmark)
2017	The Wedding March 2: Resorting to Love	Olivia	Television movie (Hallmark)
2017–2018	When Calls the Heart	AJ Foster	4 episodes
2018	The Wedding March 3: A Valentine Wedding	Olivia	Television movie (Hallmark)
2018	The Wedding March 4: Something Old, Something New	Olivia	Television movie (Hallmark)
2019	The Wedding March 5: My Boyfriend's Back	Olivia	Television movie (Hallmark)
2021	Sealed with a Kiss: Wedding March 6	Olivia	Television movie (Hallmark)
2021	Fantasy Island	Camille	Episode: "The Big Five Oh"
