= Extraterrestrial (2014 film) =

- Theatrical release poster
- Directed by: Colin Minihan
- Written by: The Vicious Brothers
- Produced by: Geoff McLean; The Vicious Brothers
- Starring: Brittany Allen; Freddie Stroma; Melanie Papalia
- Cinematography: Samy Inayeh
- Edited by: The Vicious Brothers
- Music by: Blitz//Berlin
- Production companies: Abduction Films, Manis Film, Pink Buffalo Films
- Release date: April 18, 2014 (Tribeca Film Festival)
- Running time: 106 minutes
- Country: Canada
- Language: English
- Budget: $3 million

Extraterrestrial (also known under the working title of The Visitors) is a 2014 Canadian science fiction horror film that was directed by Colin Minihan—one half of the Vicious Brothers, who co-produced, wrote, and edited the film. It stars Brittany Allen, Freddie Stroma, and Melanie Papalia as a group of friends who must defend themselves against an alien onslaught.

== Plot ==
A panicked woman runs to a shop wanting to use the phone. After being denied entry, she enters a nearby phone booth, and is taken by a flash of light.

April and her boyfriend Kyle leave to spend the weekend at her parents' cabin. However Kyle has invited his friends Seth, Melanie, and Seth's girlfriend Lex. Along the way, Seth sets off fireworks in the car and they are pulled over by Sheriff Murphy, who gives them a warning. They make it to the cabin and begin drinking and smoking marijuana bought from April's nearby family friend, Travis. Kyle proposes to April, which she rejects, angering him. Later they see something crash in the woods, and upon investigating find that it is an alien spacecraft, with footprints leading away from the crash site.

Returning to the cabin, the group encounters and shoots one of the aliens. They attempt to drive to the nearest town for help but are cut off by a fallen tree. A spacecraft appears overhead and abducts Lex as the rest flee to Travis's house. April explains what has happened and Travis gives his theory: that the aliens and the U.S. government have had a treaty since the Roswell incident; the aliens abduct people while the government is left to clean up the mess. There is only one rule: no human must engage them. Since April has shot one of them, it is considered a breach of the treaty, and now the aliens are hunting for them. The kids run back to the cabin and board up the windows, while Travis stays behind to fight, only to be killed by the aliens.

Seth mistakes Sheriff Murphy and Deputy Mitchell for aliens and they arrest him, then argue about the aliens. Sheriff Murphy reveals that he blames the aliens for his wife's disappearance. An alien appears and uses telepathy to force Murphy to shoot himself and Deputy Mitchell, but April arrives and saves Seth in the nick of time. Unfortunately he panics and runs into the forest, where he is abducted. The remainder of the group retreat to the cabin, Kyle locking April and Melanie in the basement for their own protection, before hiding in the bathroom with a knife planning to ambush the aliens. His plan fails when an alien jumps out and abducts him.

April and Melanie sit in the basement and reminisce about April's parents taking them fishing. Melanie decides to end her own life rather than be abducted, taking an overdose of sleeping pills, and leaving April to face the aliens alone. April plans to fight them off with a crowbar but the aliens leave voluntarily. When April realizes they have taken Kyle she attracts their attention by setting off fireworks, causing the aliens to return and abduct her too. She awakens on the alien spaceship and starts to explore the dark hallways, finding corpses of humans and an alien-human hybrid.

In another part of the ship, Seth wakes up stripped naked, his left arm severed and strapped to an upright operating table, where he is branded and subjected to bizarre and ultimately fatal medical experiments. April finally finds Kyle and they embrace as the aliens discover them.

Kyle and April awaken in a field, having been returned to earth. As they walk back home through the forest they come across U.S. Army soldiers at the UFO crash site, who shoot them. As they lie wounded, April gives Kyle the engagement ring, which he puts on her finger. The soldiers shoot them dead, before dumping the bodies in a pit and incinerating them, confirming there are no other surviving witnesses. The military's cleanup operation continues, confirming Travis's theory that the U.S. government is indeed hiding the existence of extraterrestrials.

== Cast ==
- Brittany Allen as April
- Freddie Stroma as Kyle
- Melanie Papalia as Melanie
- Jesse Moss as Seth
- Anja Savcic as Lex
- Gil Bellows as Sheriff Murphy
- Michael Ironside as Travis
- Sean Rogerson as Deputy Mitchell
- Emily Perkins as Nancy McPherson
- Mike Kovac as Clerk
- Ian Brown as Farmer
- Fred Keating as Mike
- Mackenzie Gray as Man in Black
- Reese Alexander as Military Officer
- Buddy as Rusty
- Jacob Tremblay as Matty (uncredited)

== Release ==
The movie had its world premiere on April 18, 2014 at the Tribeca Film Festival under the banner of IFC Midnight. Later on May 12, The Scream Factory released the film on Blu-ray and DVD.

== Reception ==
Critical reception for Extraterrestrial has been predominantly negative. IndieWire gave the film a "C−" and commented that it was "an example of how not to make a horror film". Fangoria and Bloody Disgusting both expressed disappointment over the film, as both felt that Extraterrestrial utilized too many familiar tropes and cliches of sci-fi horror movies. In contrast, Den of Geek gave the film a mostly positive review and commented that the movie had "clever visuals to occasionally distract from its mediocrity". Jack Bottomley of Starburst magazine also wrote a more positive, if slightly mixed, review saying: "Extraterrestrial is an untaxing albeit regularly clichéd watch, but still a fun dose of sci-fi horror, even if the search for a truly great modern alien horror goes on". On Rotten Tomatoes, the film has an aggregated score of 28% based on 11 positive and 29 negative critic reviews. The website’s consensus reads: "Extraterrestial does deliver a certain amount of gory genre thrills, but they're outweighed by the crushing clichés of its sagging script."
