= Kelly McCormack =

Canadian actor and activist

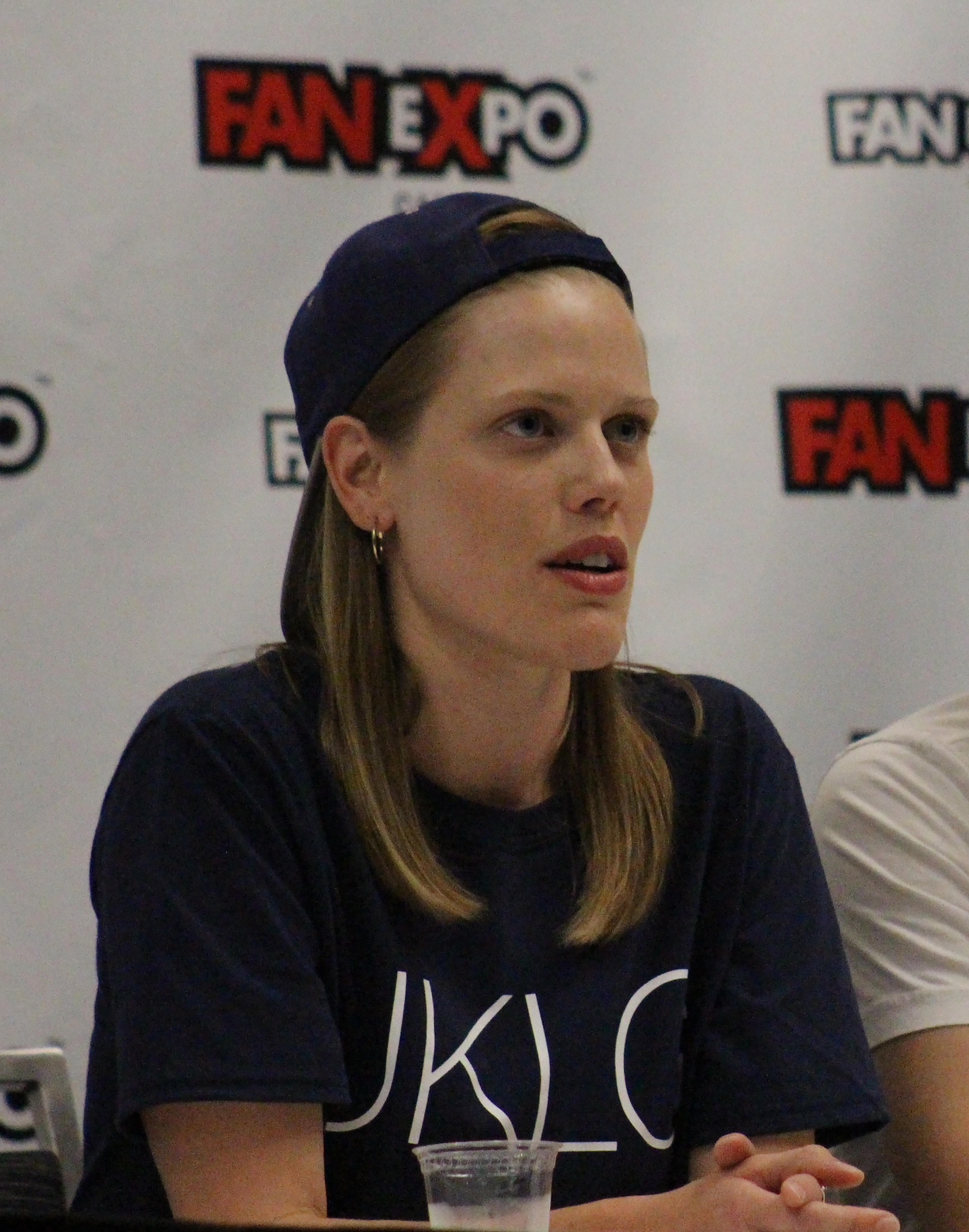
- McCormack in 2018
- Born: Vancouver, British Columbia, Canada
- Occupations: Actor, writer, producer
- Years active: 2000s–present

Kelly McCormack is a Canadian actress, writer, director, musician and producer. As an actress she is best known for playing Jess McCready in the Amazon Prime Video series A League of Their Own, Zeph Vos in the Space/Syfy series Killjoys, and Betty-Anne in the Crave series Letterkenny. McCormack has worked in film, television, and on stage, and runs the production company Floyder Films.

McCormack has written and starred in several independent feature films that have screened at film festivals around the world, including Play the Film (2013), Barn Wedding (2015), and Sugar Daddy (2020). She also starred in and produced the award-winning CBC mockumentary The Neddeaus of Duqesne Island.

== Early life ==
McCormack was born and raised in Vancouver, British Columbia. She began performing on-stage at the age of seven, training in classical music, opera, and musical theatre. As a teenager, she studied at the Lyric School of Acting, Vancouver, before attending university first in England at Herstmonceux International Study Centre, where she studied literature, and later at the University of British Columbia, where she received a bachelor's degree in literature. Kelly then moved to New York to study musical theatre.

== Career ==
After graduating from university, McCormack moved to New York City to study acting, musical theatre and experimental theatre and performed with The Flea Theatre Company as a member of The Bat Company, performing in Tony Award nominated Liz Swados' Kaspar Hauser. She later moved to Toronto and started working in the Toronto indie theatre scene with playwright Kat Sandler, originating roles in plays like Delicacy, and working in the entertainment industry.

Throughout the 2010s, she played a variety of supporting roles in a number of productions, including in the television series Defiance, 11.22.63, and Damien, as well as in the web series Teenagers and That's My DJ.

In 2013, she wrote her first feature film, Play the Film, in which she also starred. The film was produced for only $1,000. McCormack won several awards for writing the film, including Best Screenplay at the Broad Humor Film Festival. The following year, she wrote another feature film, Barn Wedding, which screened at film festivals throughout 2015.

In 2017, McCormack served as a producer and actress on several productions. In February of that year, she joined the cast of the Syfy science fiction television series Killjoys in its third season. On the series, she portrayed Zeph, an androgynous scientist, in a recurring role until the series ended.

That summer, the CBC mockumentary The Neddeaus of Duqesne Island, which McCormack both produced and starred in, was released online via CBC's official website. The series received three Canadian Screen Award nominations at the 6th Canadian Screen Awards in 2018.

In November 2017, she joined the cast for the third season of the CraveTV series Letterkenny. In early 2018, she appeared in an episode of the CBC comedy series Crawford. Later that year, she was featured in an episode of The Expanse.

On stage, McCormack has developed and performed in Charlotte: A Tri-Coloured Play With Music, an original opera based on the life of German painter Charlotte Salomon, which ran at the 2017 Luminato Festival in Toronto and at the World Stage Design Festival in Taipei.

In 2019, Kelly wrapped production of her critically acclaimed feature film Sugar Daddy, which she wrote, produced, and starred in alongside Colm Feore and an ensemble cast that includes Amanda Brugel, Aaron Ashmore, Nicholas Campbell, Noam Jenkins, Ishan Davé, Tiio Horn, Jess Salgueiro, Tony Nappo, Rob Stewart, Michelle Morgan, and Broken Social Scene’s Brendan Canning. The film premiered as the opening gala film of the 2020 Whistler Film Festival, where McCormack received an honorable mention for the Borsos Competition award for best performance in a Canadian film, and won the One to Watch award. The film also garnered Kelly the ACTRA Award for Best Performance, and a Canadian Screen Award for Best Original Music.

== Activism ==
McCormack has been vocal about her support of the #MeToo movement, and was invited to discuss the subject in an interview with CBC's q radio show.

== Filmography ==
=== Film ===
Year	Title	Role	Notes
2016	Special Correspondents	Station Accountant	
2018	A Simple Favor	Stacy	
2020	Sugar Daddy	Darren	
2023	Problemista	Sharon	
2025	Sorry, Baby	Natasha	
2025	Another Simple Favor	Stacy	

=== Television ===
Year	Title	Role	Notes
2014	Teenagers	Emily	Episode: "Keep the Change..."
2014	Defiance	Jalina	2 episodes
2016	Damien	Tara	Episode: "Abattoir"
2016	You Got Trumped: The First 100 Days	Sarah	Episode: "America's Got Empathy"
2016	11.22.63	Dawn	Episode: "The Eyes of Texas"
2016–2017	That's My DJ	Dee	9 episodes
2017	The Neddeaus of Duqesne Island	Eloida Neddeau	10 episodes
2017	Save Me	Cashier	Episode: "Hypovolemia"
2017–2019	Killjoys	Zephyr "Zeph" Vos	25 episodes
2018–2019; 2023	Letterkenny	Betty-Anne	8 episodes
2018	Crawford	Ms. Vara	Episode: "Manny's Oath of Secrecy"
2018	The Expanse	Loftis	Episode: "Reload"
2019	Carter	Ronnie Hart	Episode: "Harley Wanted To Say Bonspiel"
2020	The Amazing Gayl Pile	Gayle Pile Sr.	2 episodes
2021	Ginny & Georgia	Maddie	2 episodes
2021	Departure	Charlotte	6 episodes
2022	A League of Their Own	Jess McCready	8 episodes
2022–2023	George & Tammy	Sheila Richey	4 episodes

=== As director ===
- Sir Ludwig's DuClaudian Twins are Alive & Well and Living in the Same Building (2019)
- How Brief (2026)
