= Rory J. Saper =

British actor

Rory Jonathon Saper (born 3 April 1996) is an English actor. His films include Rufus (2012) and Influencer (2022). On television, he is known for his role in the tween series Find Me in Paris (2018–2020).

== Early life ==
Saper was born in Slough to parents Camilla and Roger and grew up in Beaconsfield with his two older sisters. His father is a stage actor. He attended Davenies School and Harrow School.

== Career ==
After making a number of short films with his friend and uploading them to YouTube, Saper was scouted at the age of fifteen to make his feature film debut as the titular character of the Canadian vampire film Rufus, which premiered in 2012. He was named Male Indie Icon at the 2013 Las Vegas Film Festival.

Saper finished school before going on to appear in more films in 2016 and 2017, including the British sports drama The Pass and as a young version of Alexander Skarsgård's Tarzan in The Legend of Tarzan. In 2018, Saper made his television debut as he began starring in the English-language tween fantasy series Find Me in Paris as Max Alvarez, a role he would play for the first two seasons. He appeared in the 2020 independent film Summerland. He has upcoming roles in the films Kindling and Influencer.

== Filmography ==
=== Film ===
Year	Title	Role	Notes
2012	Rufus	Rufus	
2016	The Pass	Bellboy	
2016	Infinite	Dribble	Short film
2016	The Legend of Tarzan	Young Tarzan	
2016	Considering Love and Other Magic	Steven	
2017	Incontrol	Victor	
2017	Money Drugs	Ryan Arrowsmith	Short film
2020	Summerland	Oliver	
2022	Kill Them with Kindness	Louis	Short film
2022	Influencer	Ryan	
2023	Kindling	Plod	

=== Television ===
Year	Title	Role	Notes
2018–2020	Find Me in Paris	Max Alvarez	Main role (seasons 1–2); guest voice (season 3)
2021	Close to Me	Josh	1 episode

=== Music videos ===
Song	Year	Artist	Notes
"Spirit Level"	2020	Ocean Flaws	
"Six Days in June"	2020	The Fratellis	
"Action Replay"	2021	The Fratellis	

=== Video games ===
Year	Title	Role	Notes
2024	MechWarrior 5: Clans	Star Commander Jayden	

== Awards and nominations ==
Year	Award	Category	Work	Result	Ref.
2013	Las Vegas Film Festival	Male Indie Icon Award	Rufus	Won	
