= The Professional Parent =

- Theatrical poster
- Directed by: Erik Jasaň
- Written by: Erik Jasaň
- Produced by: Erik Jasaň; Marian Crisan
- Starring: Ela Lehotská; Oľga Solárová; Klára Sviteková; Marianna Kroková; Andrej Šoltés
- Cinematography: Tudor Mircea
- Edited by: Cătălin Cristuțiu
- Music by: Pavol Jeňo
- Release date: 2024
- Countries: Slovakia; Romania
- Languages: Slovak; Romani

The Professional Parent is a 2024 drama film directed by Erik Jasaň. The film tells the story of a woman from eastern Slovakia who becomes the professional parent of a Roma girl, unaware of her own racist views. The Professional Parent was selected to the 2024 New York Short International Film Festival, where it won the Best International Short Film award.

== Synopsis ==
The Professional Parent takes place in a small village in eastern Slovakia and follows Ingrid, a single mother struggling to care for her young daughter and her ailing mother. Hoping to secure a more stable future for her family, she accepts the role of a “professional parent” for a Roma child—a job that provides her with financial support. What first seems like a practical solution gradually turns into a journey through moral gray zones, as Ingrid's fight for survival reveals her own prejudices, strained family ties, and the weight of a system built on inequality.

== Cast ==
- Ela Lehotská as Ingrid
- Oľga Solárová as Grandmother
- Klára Sviteková as Martinka
- Marianna Kroková as Samantha
- Andrej Šoltés as Director
