= Sean Harris Oliver =

Canadian actor and playwright

Personal details
- Education: Studio 58

Sean Harris Oliver is a Canadian actor and playwright. He is most noted for his play The Fighting Season, which was shortlisted for the Governor General's Award for English-language drama at the 2019 Governor General's Awards.

The Fighting Season is a war drama which was based in part on Oliver's father, an orthopedic surgeon who served as an army doctor during the War in Afghanistan. Following a run at the 2015 Vancouver Fringe Festival, the play had its commercial premiere in Vancouver in January 2017, and was published in book form by Scirocco Drama in 2019.

Oliver's other plays have included Bright Blue Future and Redpatch, a collaboration with Raes Calvert.

In 2024, Oliver co-wrote the screenplay for the independent horror film Hunting Matthew Nichols with Markian Tarasiuk, both of whom graduated from Studio 58.
