= The Vicious Brothers =

Canadian/American film directors

Colin Minihan
- Born: May 18, 1985 (age 41); Canada
- Occupations: Film director, screenwriter, producer, editor
- Children: 1

Stuart Ortiz
- Born: March 20, 1984 (age 42); Orange County, California, United States
- Occupations: Film director, screenwriter, producer, editor

The Vicious Brothers are Canadian-American filmmakers Colin Minihan and Stuart Ortiz. They are best known for writing and directing the cult horror film Grave Encounters, and for writing and producing its sequel Grave Encounters 2. They also wrote and produced Extraterrestrial, which Minihan solo directed.

In 2015, The Vicious Brothers had premiered their 15-part anime called Temple which was based on The Guest screenwriter Simon Barrett. In May of the same year, Minihan and Ortiz had announced that they were making Grave Encounters 3: The Beginning; however, it was quietly cancelled shortly after due to lack of public interest. In February 2020, a reboot of the 1998 slasher film Urban Legend was announced to be in development, with Minihan writing and directing.

== Filmography ==
Year	Title	Directors	Writers	Producers	Editors
2011	Grave Encounters	Yes	Yes	No	Yes
2012	Grave Encounters 2	No	Yes	Yes	Yes
2014	Extraterrestrial	Minihan	Yes	No	No
2017	It Stains the Sands Red	Minihan	Yes	No	No

Interviewees

- Unknown Dimension: The Story of Paranormal Activity (2021) (Documentary film)

Colin Minihan only

Year	Title	Director	Writer	Producer	Editor
2018	What Keeps You Alive	Yes	Yes	No	No
2019	Spiral	No	Yes	Yes	No
2025	Coyotes	Yes	No	No	Yes

Stuart Ortiz only

Year	Title	Director	Writer	Producer	Editor
2024	Strange Harvest	Yes	Yes	Yes	Yes

== Awards and nominations ==
Association	Notable work	Category	Result
Sitges Film Festival (2011)	Grave Encounters	Official Selection	Nominated
Tribeca Film Festival (2011)	Grave Encounters	N/A	Nominated
Bram Stoker International Film Festival (2011)	Grave Encounters	Best Director Award	Won
