= David Schuurman =

Canadian cinematographer

David Schuurman is a Canadian cinematographer. He is most noted for his work on the film Polaris, for which he won the Borsos Competition award for Best Cinematography in a Borsos Competition film at the 2022 Whistler Film Festival.

His other credits have included the films What Keeps You Alive, The Retreat and Influencer, and music videos for Scott Helman, Aaron Goodvin, Chad Brownlee, Jade Eagleson and The Reklaws.
