= FilmQuest =

US genre film festival

- FilmQuest logo
- Location: Provo, Utah, USA
- Founded: 2014
- Founded by: Jonathan Martin
- Most recent: 2024
- Directors: Jonathan Martin
- Festival date: Annually in October–November
- Language: English, International
- Website: filmquestfest.com

FilmQuest is an international film festival for genre films held annually in Provo, Utah, United States. It premieres and awards both feature and short films, and hosts celebrities, artists, filmmakers, industry reps and press from the fantastic, sci-fi and horror genres.

It is often cited as one of the most important genre festivals in the United States, being named twice as one of MovieMaker Magazine's 25 Coolest Film Festivals in the World in 2024 and 2023, 50 Bloody Best Genre Fests in the World in 2021 and 2019, and six times named one of their 50 Film Festivals Worth the Entry Fee in 2024, 2023, 2022, 2021, 2017, 2015, as well as one of Dread Central's Best Horror Festivals in the World in both 2022 and 2021.

== History ==
FilmQuest was founded in 2014 by filmmaker Jonathan Martin, who has been serving as festival director.

== Reception ==
DreadCentral panelists wrote that FilmQuest "has risen fast to become one of the coolest and most important genre festivals on the US circuit, with a fair selection and judging process that allows for indie discoveries in numerous categories".

MovieMaker panelists appreciated that screenings happen in one location, the Velour Live Music Gallery, and around Halloween, which allows for "unparalleled and fun networking events for the attending filmmakers", and the Q&A's ensure that the audience gets a deep insight into the films.

As of March 2025, FilmQuest is the best reviewed festival on FilmFreeway, with over 450 positive reviews from selected filmmakers.

== Awards ==
An international jury awards various feature and short film categories where nominees are announced, including the festival's flagship awards Best Feature Film and Grand Prize Best Short Film (the latter introduced in 2023, where the winner is chosen among the winners in every other major short category). The 2024 Grand Prize winner I'm Not a Robot went on to win the Oscar for Best Live Action Short Film.

=== Award winners and nominees ===
Sources:

- Best Feature Film
  - 2024 winner: The Island Between Tides
    - 2024 nominees: Catch a Killer, Daughter of the Sun, Somnium, The Beldham, The Complex Forms, The Killgrin, Tim Travers and the Time Traveler’s Paradox
  - 2023 winner: The Deep Dark
  - 2022 winner: Moon Garden
  - 2021 winner: The Free Fall
  - 2020 winner: The Mortuary Collection
  - 2019 winner: Daniel Isn't Real
  - 2018 winner: Errementari: The Blacksmith and the Devil
  - 2017 winner: The Glass Coffin
  - 2016 winner: Bear With Us
  - 2015 winner: The House at the End of Time
  - 2014 winner: Crawlspace
- Grand Prize Best Short Film
  - 2024 winner: I'm Not a Robot
    - 2024 nominees: Fishmonger, Hearts of Stone, Wake, Sweet Molly, /Haaw/, Universe 25, Faces, To Hell With You
  - 2023 winner: Escape Attempt
    - 2023 nominees: [subtext], Fck’n Nuts, Juggernaut, Murder Camp, Sincopat, Terror, To Err
- Best Found Footage Feature
  - 2024 winner: Hunting Matthew Nichols
    - 2024 nominees: Strange Harvest
  - 2023 winner: Frogman
    - 2023 nominees: Zombie Strain
- Best Found Footage Short
  - 2024 winner: Body Worn Video
    - 2023 nominees: Treadmill
  - 2023 winner: Angel Hare
    - 2023 nominees: Haunted by Nikola Tesla, Salvage, Spiral to the Center, Thin Skinned
- Best Comedy Short
  - 2024 winner: To Hell With You
- Best Fantastic & Beyond Short
  - 2024 winner: Faces
- Best Fantasy Short
  - 2024 winner: Hearts of Stone
- Best Foreign Short
  - 2024 winner: I'm Not a Robot (Netherlands)
    - 2024 nominees: Birdcage (Belgium), Coléoptère (France), Dead End (Russia), Empty Jars (Chile), Fisitor (Wales), La Croix (France), Replacement (Spain), The Bomb (Turkey), The Red Stone (Mexico)
- Best Horror Short
  - 2024 winner: Wake
- Best Micro Short
  - 2024 winner: Escape
- Best Mini Short
  - 2024 winner: One Happy Customer
- Best Midnight Short
  - 2024 winner: /Haaw/
- Best Sci-Fi Short
  - 2024 winner: Universe 25
- Best Student Short
  - 2024 winner: Fishmonger
- Best Utah Short
  - 2024 winner: Sweet Molly
- Best Animated Short
  - 2024 winner: Shimmer
- Best Documentary Short
  - 2024 winner: Born to Hustle
- Best Music Video
  - 2024 winner: Sacrament (Die Shiny)
- The Minerva Award
  - 2024 winner: Talia Shea Levin for Make Me A Pizza
- Best Director – Feature
  - 2024 winner: The Beldham – Angela Gulner
- Best Screenplay – Feature
  - 2024 winner: Tim Travers & the Time Traveler’s Paradox – Stimson Snead
- Best Actor – Feature
  - 2024 winner: Tim Travers & the Time Traveler’s Paradox – Samuel Dunning
- Best Actress – Feature
  - 2024 winner: Somnium – Chloë Levine
- Best Supporting Actor – Feature
  - 2024 winner: Scared Shitless – Steven Ogg
- Best Supporting Actress – Feature
  - 2024 winner: The Beldham – Patricia Heaton
- Best Ensemble Cast – Feature
  - 2024 winner: The Complex Forms
- Best Cinematography – Feature
- Best Editing – Feature
- Best Sound – Feature
- Best Score – Feature
- Best Production Design/Art Direction – Feature
- Best Costumes – Feature
- Best Visual Effects – Feature
- Best Makeup – Feature
- Best Director – Short
- Best Screenplay – Short
- Best Actor – Short
- Best Actress – Short
- Best Supporting Actor – Short
- Best Supporting Actress – Short
- Best Ensemble Cast – Short
- Best Cinematography – Short
- Best Editing – Short
- Best Sound – Short
- Best Score – Short
- Best Production Design/Art Direction – Short
- Best Costumes – Short
- Best Visual Effects – Short
- Best Makeup – Short
- Best Un-Produced Screenplay – Feature
- Best Un-Produced Screenplay – Short

== See also ==
- List of fantastic and horror film festivals
