= Annmarie Sairrino =

American producer

- Born: Poughkeepsie, New York
- Occupations: Producer and Development Executive
- Years active: 2012–present
- Organization: AMMO Entertainment
- Website: https://ammo-ent.com

Annmarie Sairrino is an American film producer, development executive, and CEO of AMMO Entertainment. She is known for developing and producing film projects based on existing Japanese intellectual properties, including the horror film adaptation Room 203 and the dramatic thriller Root Letter.

Sairrino began her career in the entertainment industry in 2003 working with film producer and consultant Sandy Climan at his firm Entertainment Media Ventures. In 2012, she joined All Nippon Entertainment Works (ANEW) and was senior vice president of development and production. In 2017, with her colleague Moeko Suzuki, she established Akatsuki Entertainment, a division of Japanese mobile game developer Akatsuki Inc., and ran the company's American branch in Los Angeles while CEO and a board member of Akatsuki. In November 2018, she announced her first produced project, the video game adaptation Root Letter, which was produced in 2019, completed in 2020, and acquired for distribution by Entertainment Squad and released in 2022. She followed this with a second feature, the horror film Room 203, which was produced in 2020, acquired for international sales by Voltage Pictures and for domestic distribution by Vertical Entertainment, and released in 2022. In September 2020, Sairrino established AMMO Entertainment, a production company which has assumed responsibility for Akatsuki Entertainment's completed films, and which will continue to develop film and television projects adapted from Japanese-originated sources, intellectual properties from other Asian territories, and original concepts and true stories in the horror and thriller genres.

Since 2024, Sairrino's work with AMMO Entertainment has expanded into consulting for the international entertainment industry, including for the animation production company Qubic Pictures and the virtual YouTuber agency COVER Corporation, the parent company of Hololive Production.

== Early life ==
Annmarie Sairrino was born in Poughkeepsie, New York and raised in the town of Highland. She is a graduate of State University of New York at New Paltz.

== Career ==
After moving to Los Angeles in the early 2000s, Sairrino joined the entertainment industry as an assistant to Golden Globe-winning producer Sandy Climan (The Aviator); she later transitioned to Climan's director of development and vice president of creative affairs, and worked with his consultancy firm Entertainment Media Ventures and its associated companies, including 3ality Digital (U2 3D).

In 2012, Sairrino joined All Nippon Entertainment Works (ANEW), a firm which sought to develop Hollywood film projects based upon Japanese-originated properties. She as senior vice president of development and production, and during this time developed expertise in the clearance of intellectual property chain of title, a complex but necessary aspect of rights clearance in the adaptation process. During her time at ANEW, Sairrino developed adaptation projects based on the anime series Tiger & Bunny and Gaiking, the novel and live-action film Shield of Straw, the live-action films Ghost Train (with a screenplay by Sonic the Hedgehog writers Patrick Casey and Josh Miller) and Birthright, and the manga series SOUL ReVIVER and 6000. Partners for these projects included Ron Howard and Brian Grazer's Imagine Entertainment, Edward Zwick and Marshall Herskovitz's The Bedford Falls Company, Mike Medavoy's Phoenix Pictures, Chris and Paul Weitz's company Depth of Field, and Gale Anne Hurd's Valhalla Entertainment. Following a change of ownership, a corporate realignment of ANEW in 2017 led to many of these projects remaining unrealized. However, ANEW's effort marked the accomplishment of the largest slate of Japanese properties in development in Hollywood to that time.

In 2017, Sairrino established a new film production company, Akatsuki Entertainment USA, as a division of leading Japanese mobile game developer Akatsuki. Sairrino was the CEO of Akatsuki Entertainment and served as a board member of the parent company. Akatsuki Entertainment's business model focused on the adaptation of Japanese-originated intellectual properties into live-action Hollywood films. Akatsuki Entertainment's film activities included project development, financing, and production. In 2018, the company announced their first film, an adaptation of the best-selling Kadokawa Games visual novel Root Letter. Directed by Sonja O'Hara, written by David Ebeltoft, and starring Danny Ramirez, Keana Marie, Lydia Hearst, and Mark St. Cyr, the film entered production in 2019, was completed in 2020, was acquired for US distribution by Entertainment Squad, and was released on September 1, 2022. Sairrino developed and produced the film, which was selected for the 2022 Beverly Hills Film Festival.

Also in 2020, Sairrino developed and produced Akatsuki Entertainment's second project, the supernatural horror film Room 203. Adapted from the novel of the same name written by Nanami Kamon and published by Kobunsha, Room 203 was directed by Ben Jagger, written by John Poliquin, Nick Richey, and Jagger, and starred Francesca Xuereb, Viktoria Vinyarska, and Eric Wiegand. The film was fully-financed and produced by Akatsuki Entertainment and was filmed in Shreveport, Louisiana in the fall of 2020, with post-production completed in 2021. In June 2021, Voltage Pictures acquired worldwide sales rights for Room 203 ahead of presenting its sales slate at the Cannes Film Festival virtual film market, with Voltage citing the robust market for J-horror-derived projects among international buyers. The film was subsequently acquired for domestic theatrical and video on demand distribution by Vertical Entertainment, and was released theatrically on April 15, 2022; a release on Hulu followed in July of that year. Internationally, the film received theatrical and home-video releases in Europe, the Middle East, and select territories in Latin America and Asia, with several top 10 weekend openings.

In September 2020, Sairrino established AMMO Entertainment, a new production company which assumed responsibility for completion of the distribution arrangements for Root Letter and Room 203, as well as the production of Akatsuki Entertainment's development slate. AMMO Entertainment's corporate mission broadened the mandate of Akatsuki Entertainment to include the production of film and television productions based on true stories and original concepts, in addition to continuing a strong focus on Japanese content adaptations.

In October 2022, Sairrino announced the formation of the new specialty label AMMO Select, as well as the imprint's initial project, Amy & Monte: A Legacy of Love and Creativity, a feature-length documentary following the careers and romance of astrologer-artist couple Amy Zerner and Monte Farber. Sairrino's work on the film was subsequently profiled with featured articles in Dan's Papers and OMTimes, and the film was awarded the Audience Choice Award for Best Documentary at the 2025 New Hope Film Festival.

== Filmography ==
| Year | Title | Position | Notes |
|---|---|---|---|
| 2022 | Root Letter | Producer | Released |
| 2022 | Room 203 | Producer | Released |
| TBD | Amy & Monte: A Legacy of Love and Creativity | Producer | Post-Production |
