= Jaime Callica =

Canadian actor (born 1985)

- Born: Jaime M. Callica; November 3, 1985 (age 40); Toronto, Ontario, Canada
- Occupations: Actor and former dancer
- Years active: 2010–present (Note: Callica stated in an interview with upfrontNY that he considers 2015 to be the year of the beginning of his career.)

Jaime M. Callica (born November 3, 1985) is a Canadian actor and former dancer known for his roles as Agent Brian Rollins in the television series Ruthless and in Wayward Pines as well as for his works in cinema, including Hypnotic (2021), Trap House (2023), and Bodycam (2025).

== Early life ==
Callica was born as a single child in Toronto in 1985 and was raised by a single mother. Callica showed interest in acting and dancing since an early age, taking dance classes with a specialization in tap and jazz. He also took up karate, attaining a black belt at the age of 13 and the official belt at 16. After high school, Callica moved to Vancouver in the early 2000s to study criminology, later deciding to focus on business and real estate management.

While living in British Columbia, Callica was a national champion in karate for several years on a row and was part of Team BC and Team Canada of that sport. His passion for sports made him coach teenage students at his former high school. After deciding to pursue a professional acting career, Callica sold his businesses and began taking classes to become an actor, subsequently moving to Los Angeles.

== Career ==
Callica was cast in 2010 for Percy Jackson & the Olympians: The Lightning Thief in a minor role, gradually ascending in television movies and series like Almost Human (2013–2014) and Wayward Pines in 2016, as well as in The Romeo Section in that same year. In 2018, Callica portrayed the character of Xavier Chopin in the series UnREAL while continuing his works in television films, especially in Christmas movies for which he became known as "the king of Christmas."

In film, Callica has additionally starred in other productions like Hypnotic, Trap House, and Bodycam, in this latter movie sharing the lead role with fellow Canadian actor Sean Rogerson. He also joined the cast of drama series Ruthless in 2020, serving as one of the main characters in the role of Agent Brian Rollins.

== Personal life ==
Callica is of Trinidadian descent with mixed Chinese, Indian, and Spanish ancestry from his mother's family.

In 2004, he and a friend were struck by a drunk driver in Vancouver. His friend survived too but Callica suffered injuries that put an end to his professional career as a dancer.

He was known by his PR team as "the hottest thing out of Canada since the two Ryan's" (Gosling and Reynolds). In an August 2020 interview with the Los Angeles Sentinel, Callica stated that one of his aims was to become financially successful to help his mother retire, expressing gratitude for her sacrifice in raising him on her own. He also credited karate with helping him in his life and added that he wanted to be a father.

Outside of acting, Callica is an advocate for the rights of single mothers and parents, as well as for the rights of people with disabilities. He has residences in Los Angeles and Vancouver, splitting his time between the two cities.

== Selected roles ==
=== Television ===
Year	Title	Role	Ref.
2013–2014	Almost Human	Various roles	
2016	Wayward Pines	Simeon	
2016	The Romeo Section	Don	
2017	Imaginary Mary	Hot Bartender	
2018	UnREAL	Xavier Chopin	
2020–2021	Nancy Drew	Perry	
2020–2026	Ruthless	Agent Brian Rollins	

=== Film ===
Year	Title	Role	Ref.
2010	Percy Jackson & the Olympians: The Lightning Thief	Lotus Land Dancer	
2012	Rags	Dancer	
2014	Date and Switch	Dancer (Note: Uncredited)	
2017	Power Rangers	Officer Bebe	
2021	Hypnotic	Brian Rawley	
2023	Trap House	Detective Grant Pierce	
2023	Vindicta	Jason Clark	
2025	Bodycam	Officer Jackson	
