= Grave Encounters 2 =

2012 film by John Poliquin

- Theatrical release poster
- Directed by: John Poliquin
- Written by: The Vicious Brothers
- Based on: Grave Encounters by The Vicious Brothers
- Produced by: Shawn Angelski; Martin Fisher; Geoff McLean
- Starring: Richard Harmon; Leanne Lapp; Sean Rogerson; Dylan Playfair; Stephanie Bennett; Howard Lai
- Cinematography: Tony Mirza
- Edited by: John Poliquin; The Vicious Brothers
- Music by: Quynne Alana Paxa
- Production companies: Twin Engine Films; Pink Buffalo Films
- Distributed by: Tribeca Film Festival; Arclight Films
- Release dates: October 2, 2012 (VOD or iTunes); October 12, 2012 (U.S. theatrical release)
- Running time: 100 minutes
- Country: Canada
- Language: English
- Budget: $1.4 million
- Box office: $8.2 million

Grave Encounters 2 is a 2012 Canadian found footage supernatural horror film written by the Vicious Brothers and directed by John Poliquin. The sequel to Grave Encounters (2011), it stars Richard Harmon, Leanne Lapp, Dylan Playfair, Stephanie Bennett, and Howard Lai as a group of fans of the original Grave Encounters film who break into the same psychiatric hospital where the film took place to investigate whether its events were real and find themselves terrorized by the hospital's malevolent entities. The film utilizes metafictional and film within a film elements as Sean Rogerson plays a fictional version of himself who reprises his role as Lance Preston from the original film.

Grave Encounters 2 was released on iTunes on October 2, 2012, with a limited theatrical release in the United States, on October 12, 2012. The film was a commercial success, grossing over $8.2 million against a $1.4 million budget, but unlike its predecessor, it was largely panned by critics.

== Plot ==
Film student Alex Wright is a fan of Grave Encounters, a found footage supernatural horror film which the entire public aside from him believes to be fictional. He posts an online plea for information about the film and receives a message from someone named "DeathAwaits6". The message leads Alex to the mother of Sean Rogerson, the actor who played Lance Preston in Grave Encounters. She believes that Sean is still alive but Alex discovers that she has dementia and does not realize that her son is dead.

Alex realizes the cast and crew from Grave Encounters are all missing or have died, except for the directors, the Vicious Brothers, who are actually interns of the first film's producer Jerry Hartfield and were not directly involved. Alex meets Hartfield, who confesses that the film was actual found footage. Discovering that the Collingwood Psychiatric Hospital is actually an abandoned asylum in British Columbia, Canada, Alex and his friends—Trevor Thomspon, Jennifer Parker, Tessa Hamill, and Jared Lee—travel there to meet DeathAwaits6 and discover a Ouija board. The group use it to communicate with the spirits, realizing that their online contact is not a person, but a paranormal entity, which turns violent and attacks them.

The group make their way out before being stopped by a security guard. As they argue, the guard goes inside the asylum to investigate a noise. The group hear gun shots and go back inside to check what happened, finding that the guard has disappeared. They are attacked by the spirits and become separated; Jared gets lost and is violently hurled out of a window while Tessa has her head crushed by an invisible force. Alex, Trevor, and Jennifer regroup and witness as the guard is fatally electrocuted in an operation table. They manage to escape the asylum and return to their hotel room, but the elevator leads them right back to the tunnels beneath the asylum.

Alex, Trevor, and Jennifer meet a lobotomized Sean and discover that he has been trapped inside the asylum, surviving on toilet water and rats for over nine years. Sean explains that the reason the asylum is haunted is due to Dr. Arthur Friedkin's satanic experiments and rituals which merged the spirit world and the physical world. He shows them a red door and reveals it is the only way out, but is wrapped in chains. Sean also provides them a map he created explaining how bigger the asylum is and how its layout constantly changes. While the group sleeps for the night, Sean, compelled by Dr. Friedkin, strangles Trevor to death and steals Alex's equipment to cut the chains on the door.

When Sean goes through it, he realizes that the door leads nowhere. The asylum's entities instruct a now-deranged Sean to kill Alex and Jennifer; they wake up and stumble upon Dr. Friedkin's satanic altar as he performs a lobotomy, then sacrifices an infant. Sean finds them and demands to hand over their footage in order to "finish the film", which is the only way to escape the asylum. During the struggle, a void opens up on the wall and sucks Sean towards an unknown fate. Realizing that Sean was being honest in how to escape, Alex kills Jennifer by smashing her face with the camera, thus finishing the film. He then exits the asylum through the door, which leads him to the Los Angeles outskirts and is arrested while walking down the street at night.

It is revealed that Alex's footage has been made into a Grave Encounters sequel, with Alex and Hartfield claiming that everything the public has seen is staged and that it is "just a film"; Alex also tells the public not to go anywhere near the asylum as it is not worth it as the footage cuts to a black screen with the numbers "49, 14, 122, 48". If searched on Google Maps, comes up as the approximate latitude and longitude coordinates of Riverview Hospital (actually at 49.25,-122.81), where most of the film's story takes place.

== Cast ==
- Richard Harmon as Alex Wright
- Sean Rogerson as Lance Preston / Himself
- Dylan Playfair as Trevor Thompson
- Leanne Lapp as Jennifer Parker
- Stephanie Bennett as Tessa Hamill
- Howard Lai as Jared Lee
- Sean Tyson as the asylum's security guard
- Ben Wilkinson as Jerry Hartfield
- Arthur Corber as Dr. Arthur Friedkin
- Brenda McDonald as Mrs. Rogerson
- The Vicious Brothers as themselves
- Dalila Bela as Kaitlin, a former patient at Collingwood
- Roy Campsall as the emaciated demon
- Melissa Valvok and Brenda Anderson as nurse demons
- Dale Hall as an operated patient
- Maddox Valvok as an infant
- Merwin Mondesir (uncredited cameo) as T. C. Gibson / Himself
- Mackenzie Gray (uncredited cameo) as Houston Grey / Himself
- Juan Riedinger (uncredited cameo) as Matt White / Himself
- Ashleigh Gryzcko (uncredited cameo) as Sasha Parker / Herself
- Reese Alexander and Meeshelle Neal as Los Angeles police officers

== Production ==
Grave Encounters 2 began production in late 2011 and was released on October 12, 2012. Early in production it was revealed that the film would be directed by John Poliquin, and only written by the Vicious Brothers. The film's budget was $1,400,000. It was released on October 12, 2012 in a limited theatrical run, but released earlier in the month on iTunes for download.

== Reception ==
=== Critical response ===
Grave Encounters 2 was largely panned by critics. Rotten Tomatoes gave the film a score of 9% based on 11 reviews, with an average rating of 3.9 out of 10. Although it was panned, some critics praised the acting, especially Sean Rogerson's performance.

== Future ==
=== Cancelled sequel ===
In May 2015, the Vicious Brothers announced plans for a third installment, entitled Grave Encounters 3: The Beginning, but it never went into production.

=== Reboot ===
On September 18, 2025, it was announced that an American reboot is in development, with Justin Long set to star, as well as produce alongside Kate Bosworth and the Vicious Brothers. The reboot aims to "modernize the concept into a cinematic experience, heightening the dread, claustrophobia, and psychological terror that made the original a fan favorite".
