= Beau Han Bridge =

Chinese-Canadian director, writer, and actor

Beau Han Bridge is a Chinese-Canadian director, writer, and actor. In 2017, he created Midtwenties Theatre Society, a nonprofit theatre company, to produce original plays that focus on contemporary-millennial stories and coming-of-age themes. His work has received regular press coverage from several national media outlets and newspapers, including CBC, The Vancouver Sun, The Georgia Straight, and Delta Optimist.

Bridge has also produced several micro-budget short films and one micro-budget feature-film that have been exhibited in local theatres and film festivals, including the Vancouver Asian Film Festival Mighty-Movie Marathon (2017) and Canada International Film Festival (2016). He is also a regular actor and has had small-role appearances in Netflix's adaptation of Death Note (2017), Story of a Girl (2017), Imaginary Mary (2017) and The Romeo Section (2016).

== Theatre productions ==
List of plays that Beau Han Bridge directed for the stage.

- The Last Waltz (South Delta Secondary School | SU - Student Theatre; 2011)
- This Is Our Youth (Red Gate Revue Stage; 2017)
- Above The Hospital (Red Gate Revue Stage; 2018)
