= Root Letter =

2016 video game

- Developer: Kadokawa Games
- Publishers: JP: Kadokawa Games; WW: PQube
- Producer: Akari Uchida
- Artist: Mino Taro
- Writer: Dario Fuji
- Composer: Takashi Nitta
- Platforms: PlayStation 4, PlayStation Vita, Microsoft Windows, Android, iOS
- Release: PS4, PS Vita: JP: 16 June 2016; EU: 28 October 2016; NA: 10 November 2016; Microsoft Windows: JP: 31 March 2017; WW: 7 July 2017; Android, iOS: JP: 25 August 2017
- Genres: Adventure, visual novel
- Mode: Single-player

Root Letter, stylized as √Letter, is a 2016 visual novel adventure video game developed and published by Kadokawa Games for PlayStation 4, PlayStation Vita, Microsoft Windows, Android, and iOS. It is the first entry in the Kadokawa Game Mystery brand, and was followed by Root Film in 2020.

Root Letter: Last Answer, a revamp of the game with additional content, including live-action sequences, was released on August 30 and September 3, 2019 for Europe and North America with an initial release in Asia in December 2018.

A live-action American feature film adaptation of the game was announced in 2018 as a co-production between US-based AMMO Entertainment and Japan-based Ammo Inc. The film entered production in September 2019, and was released on September 1, 2022.

== Gameplay ==
An example of how Max mode is used in Root Letter.

The game plays as an adventure visual novel. In the game, the player must figure out what happened to the character of Aya, a girl who mysteriously vanished after receiving a particular letter. The gameplay is split into two distinct parts: the adventure part, where the player interrogates characters who knew Aya in order to find more information about her, and the simulation parts, where the player reads through past letters from Aya and selects - out-of-universe - their contents, thereby influencing the later portions of the game.

== Story ==
Root Letter is set in Matsue, Shimane Prefecture, where the protagonist arrives in search of Fumino Aya, a pen pal friend from high school who had disappeared for 15 years. After he finds a letter dedicated to him from her that was never sent, he sets out to interrogate her classmates as he wonders if everything Aya had told him had been a lie. The game contains multiple endings based on the player's choices throughout the game.

== Development and release ==
The game was announced in November 2015, for both the Japanese and international market. It was introduced as the first title in a line of adventure video games by Kadokawa Games, the Kadokawa Game Mystery series. Each entry in the series is planned to contain the same "fictional actresses" playing different roles across different titles. Key staff from Konami's LovePlus series of dating sim games contributed to the game, including character designer Mino Taro, and producer Akari Uchida.

Root Letter was released for the PlayStation 4 and the PlayStation Vita by Kadokawa Games on 16 June 2016 in Japan, and by PQube on 28 October 2016 in Europe and 1 November 2016 in North America. It was also released for Microsoft Windows in Japan on 31 March 2017 and internationally on 7 July 2017, and for Android and iOS in Japan on 25 August 2017.

A sequel, Root Film, was announced to be in development in 2018. It was later announced that the game would be released on July 30, 2020 in Japan, with a worldwide release date set for 2021. A live-action video project based on the original game is additionally planned to be produced by Perfect World Pictures.

In August 2018, a new version of the game, Root Letter: Last Answer was announced. The game is a live-action remake that allows the player to either use the animated or live-action scenes/photos for the game's graphics. It includes new scenarios that take place after the game's various endings. It was released in Japan on December 20 for the PlayStation 4, PlayStation Vita and Nintendo Switch, while it was released in other parts of the world on September 2, 2019 without having a Vita release.

== Reception ==
Reception

Aggregate score
Aggregator	Score
Metacritic	(Vita) 78/100 (PS4) 68/100

Root Letter received "generally favorable" reviews for PlayStation Vita, and "mixed or average" reviews for PlayStation 4, according to the review aggregator Metacritic.

=== Sales ===
During its opening week in Japan, 8,907 copies were sold, of which 4,855 were of the PlayStation Vita version, and 4,052 of the PlayStation 4 version. The two versions were, respectively, the eleventh and fourteenth best selling games of that week in Japan. Despite the game not appearing on the weekly Media Create charts again in Japan, worldwide sales passed 200,000 copies sold by January 2017, making it a commercial success. By July 2017, another 100,000 copies had been sold, bringing total worldwide sales to 300,000, and by February 2018 it had passed 400,000 copies sold. As of April 2022, the total number of series shipments and digital sales had surpassed 500,000 units.

Geraint Evans, the head of marketing of PQube, called their Root Letter sales "phenomenal", with the vast majority sold on the PlayStation Vita.

== Legacy ==
A sequel, Root Film, was released in Japan in 2020, and in North America in March 2021. The game is not a direct sequel, but a thematic one.

=== Film adaptation ===
An American feature film adaptation of the game was announced in November 2018 by Los Angeles-based film production company Akatsuki Entertainment. The film, produced and financed by Akatsuki Entertainment, is directed by Sonja O'Hara, written by David Ebeltoft, produced by Annmarie Sairrino, Moeko Suzuki, and Kat McPhee, and starring Danny Ramirez, Keana Marie, and Lydia Hearst, began shooting in Shreveport, Louisiana on September 16, 2019. In June 2021, the film's rights were transferred from Akatsuki Inc. to producer Annmarie Sairrino's AMMO Entertainment and Moeko Suzuki's Ammo Inc. production companies. The film was subsequently acquired for release in the United States by distributor Entertainment Squad, which also provides foreign sales and offered the film rights at the 2022 Toronto International Film Festival. The film was released on September 1, 2022, and is envisioned as a gritty re-imagining of the game's core story of a protagonist in search of a former pen pal who disappears under mysterious circumstances. The trailer for the film was released on August 3, 2022.
