= Hyphen Hyphen =

French electropop band

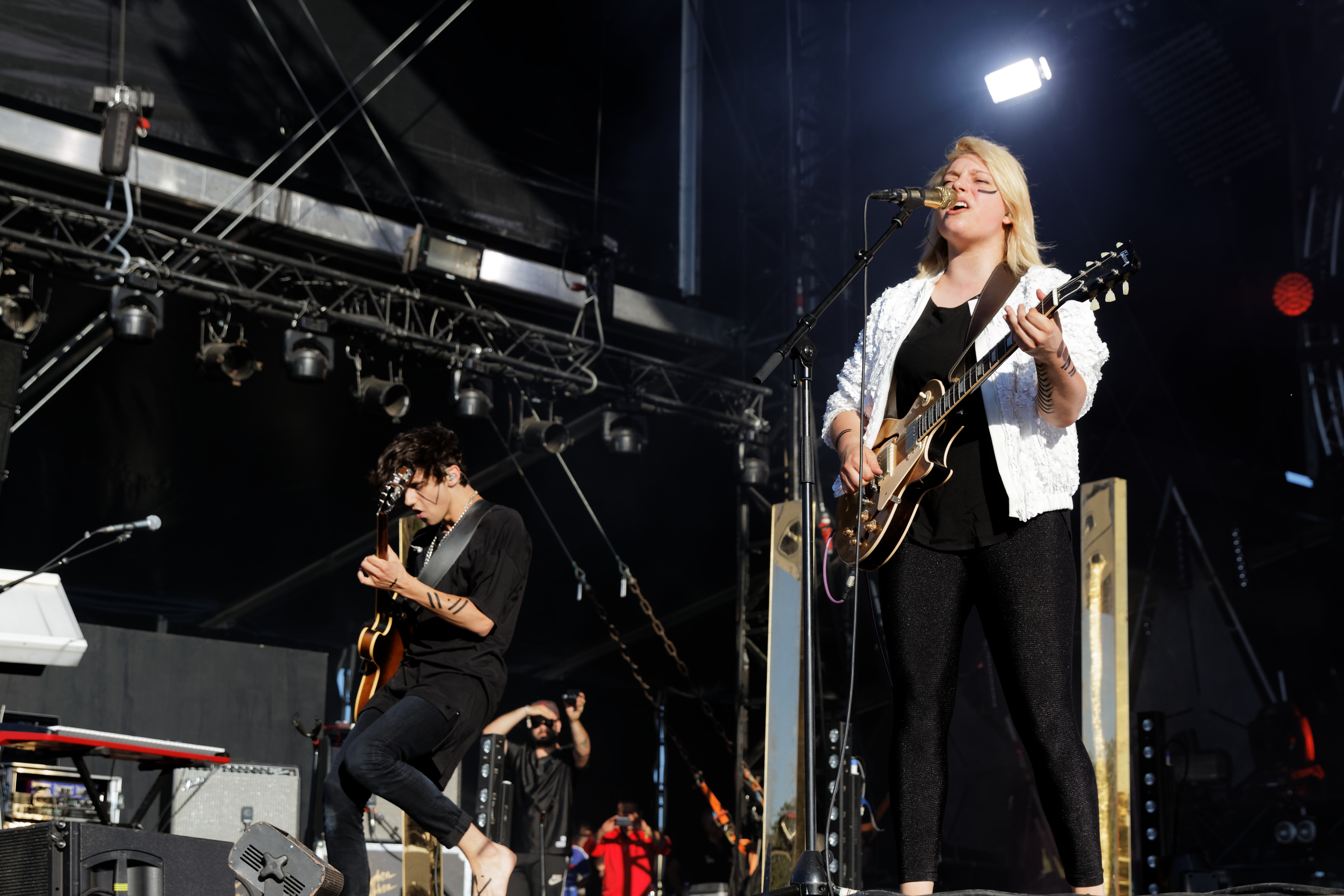
- Hyphen Hyphen in 2016

Background information
- Origin: Nice, France
- Genres: Electropop
- Years active: 2010–2025
- Labels: Parlophone Records; Warner Chappell Music
- Members: Santa; Line; Adam
- Past members: Zac
- Website: hyphenhyphen-music.com

Hyphen Hyphen is a French electropop band from Nice, consisting of members Santa, Line and Adam. They have released three studio albums, Times, HH, and C'est La Vie.

== History ==
=== Early years (2011–2014) ===
The band was formed at the lycée Masséna in Nice, South of France. They chose the term Hyphen from Ancient Greek ὑφ᾽ ἕν (hyph' hén) standing for "in one" through the looking-glass.

Santa and Adam are childhood friends, and met Line and Zac in high school.

In March 2011, Hyphen Hyphen self-released their first extended play titled Chewbacca I'm Your Mother.

Having taken part in several regional as well as national music contests, they notably won the Prix du Jury of Les Inrocks Lab, and the Biennial of Young Creators from Europe and the Mediterranean.

In 2012, they released their second EP Wild Union. The first elements from their current visual identity began showing with these projects, including tribal signs. They would later use the term Wild Union to describe the bond they formed both within the band and with their ever-growing audience.

After performances in the Provence-Alpes-Côte d'Azur region, Hyphen Hyphen started performing all over France including high-profile festivals such as Printemps de Bourges as finalists, and Rock en Seine.

In 2013, Hyphen Hyphen won FAIR, détours ADAMI, and Best Live of OÜI FM radio. They participed to Solidays and Eurockéennes de Belfort.

=== Times and HH (2014–2020) ===
On 18 September 2015, their debut album Times, with all tracks written, composed, arranged and produced by the then four members, was released in France. They recorded the voices of Just Need Your Love at Villa Coco Beach. This song was also subject to a music video, directed by John Poliquin and produced by Hervé Humbert for U-Man films.

The group designs the visual of their album covers.

On 12 February 2016, Hyphen Hyphen won the Award for Revelation Scene (Best New Live act) at Victoires de la Musique, the French Music Awards, with their memorable performance of Just Need Your Love. In September 2016, the film director Jalil Lespert chose this music for his short movie Paris Je t'aime featuring Astrid Roos.

In September 2017, the band released the fifth track from Times, Closer to You, as a single.

On April 7, 2018, Hyphen Hyphen performed at 30th Chorus festival in La Seine musicale, Île Seguin. On 25 May 2018, Hyphen Hyphen released their second album HH and went on tour for over one and a half-years. They performed more than 150 shows all around France, Belgium and Switzerland. The album has been recorded in Studio Atlas Paris.

On 22 March 2019, the single Lonely Baby featuring Kiiara was released internationally.

=== C'est La Vie and solo project (2020–2025) ===
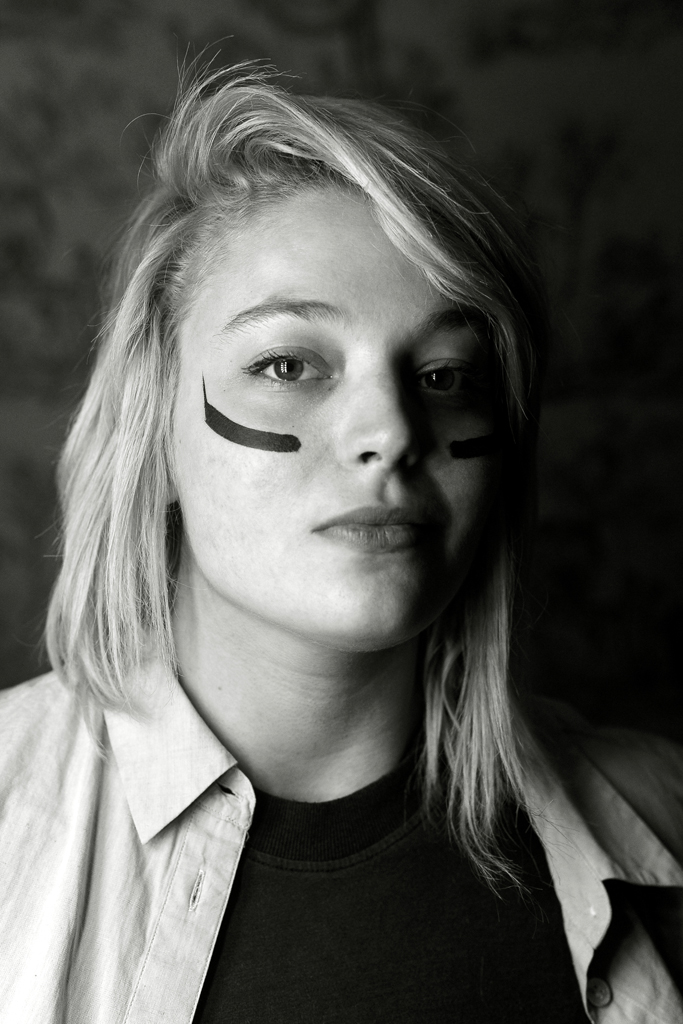
Santa - Hyphen Hyphen in 2016.

Starting in 2020, the band began the writing and production of their fourth album, C'est La Vie. They wrote and autoproduced most of the songs during lockdown. The album was recorded in ICP Studio, Brussels, where the band also recorded their first album Times in 2015.

On 21 June 2022, the band performed during the Summerstage Festival in Central Park.

Hyphen Hyphen released the first single of their new album on May 13, 2022, titled Don't Wait for Me. Two weeks later on May 30, the band released the single Too Young, which was chosen by the French TV network TF1 and FIFA to be the official anthem for UEFA Women's Euro 2022.

In September 2022, the band officially announced their new 2023 European Tour C'est La Vie Tour, with performances in France, Belgium, Switzerland and Luxembourg. Later that year, Hyphen Hyphen released the album's third single Call My Name. Prior to the launch of the adjacent tour, the band released the fourth and final single from the album, called Own God.

On 20 January 2023, Hyphen Hyphen release their fourth album C'est La Vie, before embarking on a North America tour in August 2023.

According to a June 2025 article on RTBF, Hyphen Hyphen disbanded earlier that year.

== Members ==
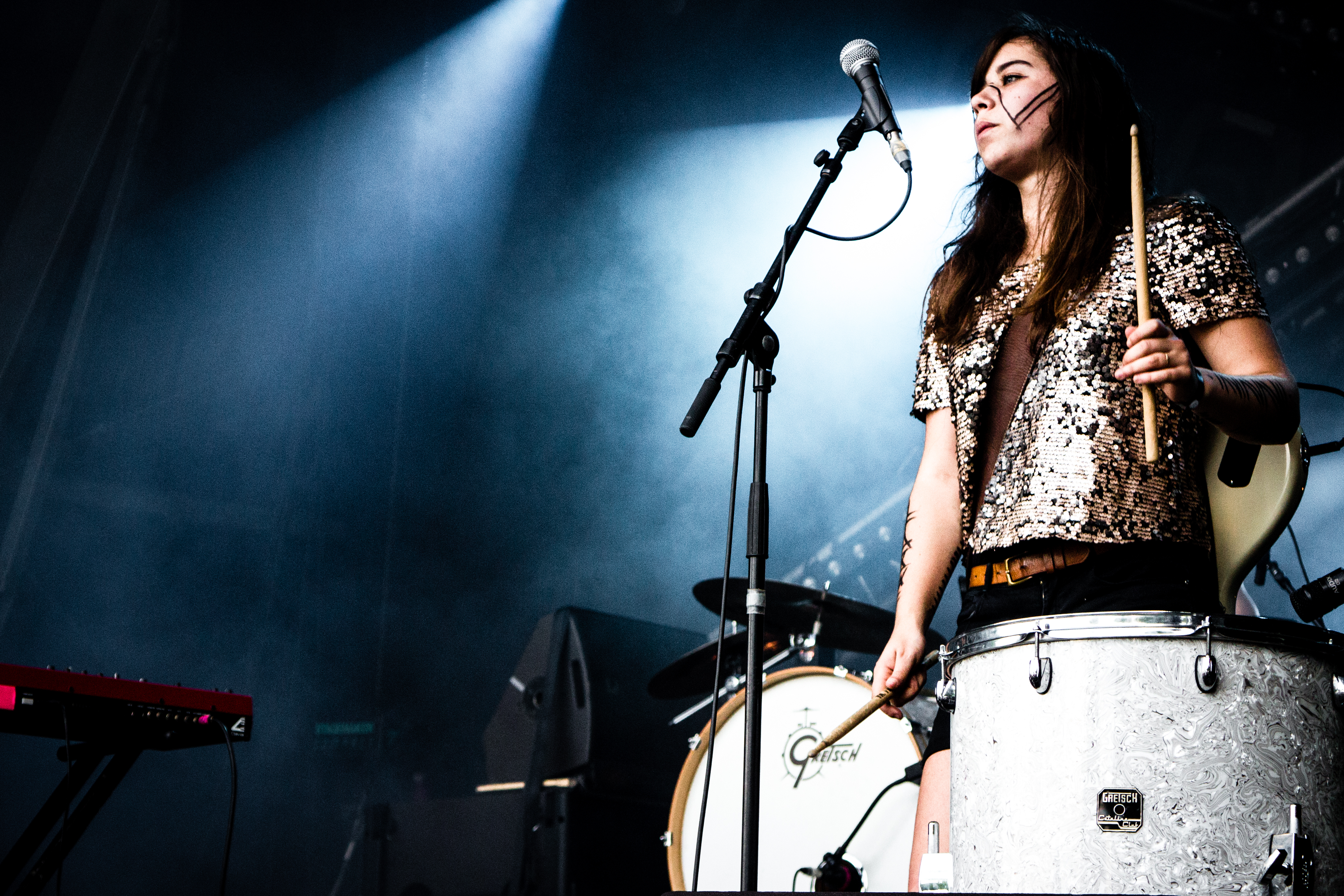
Line - Hyphen Hyphen in 2016.

The three-member band is composed of:

1. Santa – lead vocals, guitar and synth. Santa is of both French and American descent
2. Line – bass, drums, vocals
3. Adam – guitar, keys, vocals

Drummers:

- Zac left the band in 2016
- Zoé during the HH Tour
- Axel during the C'est La Vie Tour

== Discography ==
=== Albums ===
Year	Album	Charts			Certification
Year	Album	FRA	BEL	SWI	Certification
2015	Times	27	16	—	
2016	Times & Lives	115	—	—	
2018	HH	6	9	44	
2023	C'est La Vie	61	25	—	

== Track listing ==
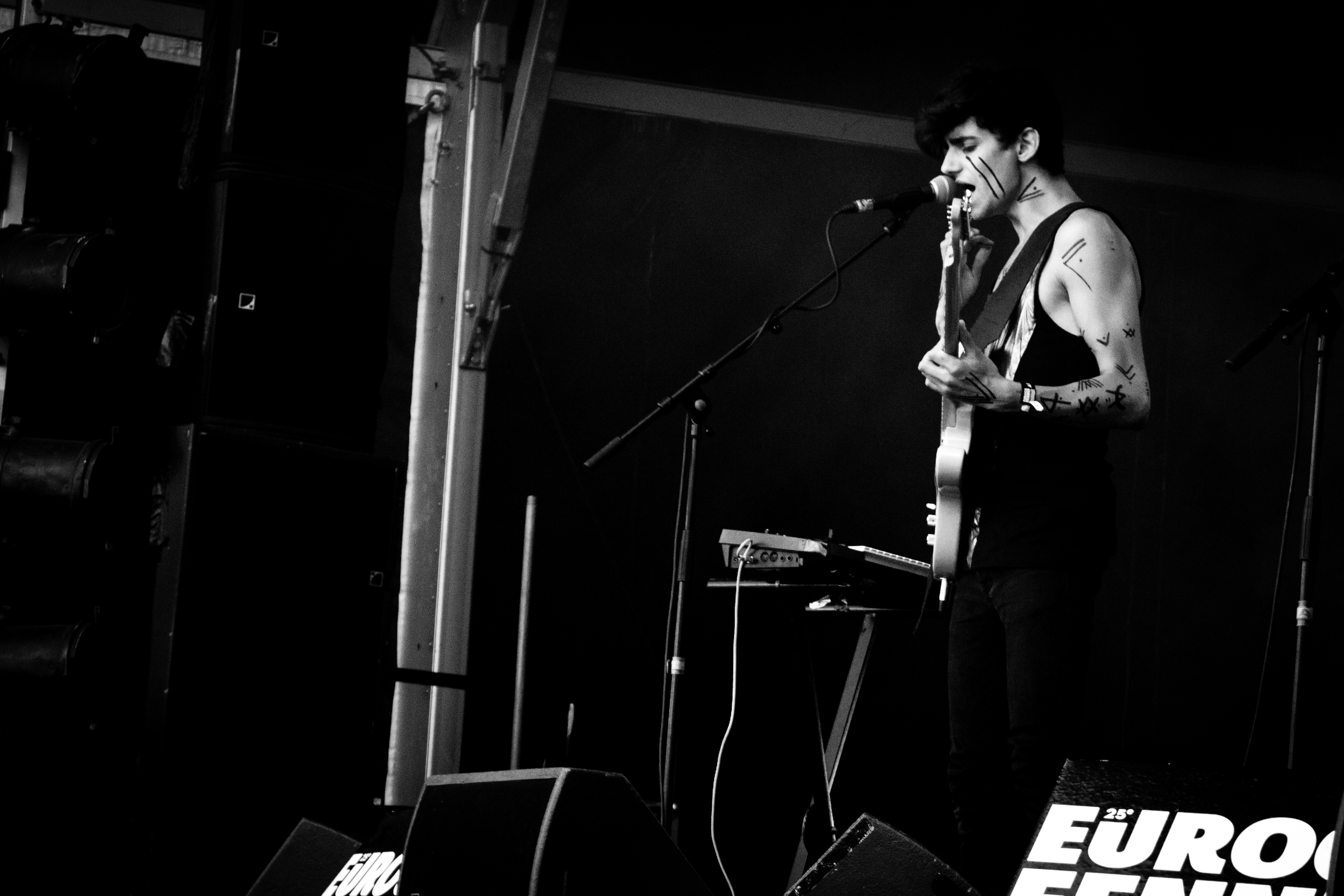
Adam– Hyhen Hyphen in 2013

=== EP ===
- Chewbacca I Am Your Mother (2011): Grace, Epiphany, Only One, Baby Baby Sweet Sweet, Never Ever;
- Wild Union (2012): Major Tom, Atlas, Wild Patterns, Mvt II, Empty Fire.

=== Times (2015) ===
No.	Title	Length
1.	"I Cry All Day"	3:27
2.	"Just Need Your Love"	4:10
3.	"We Light The Sunshine"	3:18
4.	"Cause I Got A Chance"	3:10
5.	"Closer to You"	3:08
6.	"Please Me"	3:55
7.	"The Fear Is Blue"	4:36
8.	"Stand Back"	3:16
9.	"No Sweet Surrenders"	3:14
10.	"I See Myself"	2:58
11.	"Steel"	3:44
12.	"Endless Lines"	4:41
Total length:		43:37

=== HH (2018) ===
No.	Title	Length
1.	"Take My Hand"	4:48
2.	"Like Boys"	3:10
3.	"Mama Sorry"	3:55
4.	"KND"	3:55
5.	"Be High With Me"	3:33
6.	"The Way To Stay"	3:25
7.	"Young Leaders"	3:39
8.	"Last Call"	3:41
9.	"Lonely Baby"	3:21
10.	"Kiss You"	3:17
11.	"Higher"	4:11
Total length:		40:55

=== C'est La Vie (2023) ===
No.	Title	Length
1.	"Don't Wait For Me"	2:58
2.	"Too Young"	3:30
3.	"Symphony"	3:40
4.	"C'est La Vie"	2:51
5.	"Own God"	3:20
6.	"Cry (Cry Cry) – Interlude"	1:41
7.	"Cry (Cry Cry)"	2:56
8.	"Lie!"	3:07
9.	"Voices In My Head"	3:04
10.	"Help Yourself Out"	4:02
11.	"Call My Name – Interlude"	2:25
12.	"Call My Name"	3:40
Total length:		37:19

=== Singles ===
Year	Title	Charts			Album
Year	Title	FRA (Fr)	BEL (Fl)	BEL (Wa)	Album
2015	Just Need Your Love	12	14 (Ultratip)*	21 (Ultratip)*	Times
2015	Cause I Got A Chance	—	Tip**	36 (Ultratip)*	Times
2016	Stand Back	—	—	34 (Ultratip)*	Times
2016	We Light The Sunshine	184	—	48 (Ultratip)*	Times
2018	Like Boys	24	—	41 (Ultratip)*	HH
2018	KND				HH
2018	Mama Sorry				HH
2019	Lonely Baby featuring Kiiara	—	—	43 (Ultratip)*	Non-album single
2020	Young Leaders				HH
2022	Don't Wait For Me				C'est La Vie
2022	Too Young				C'est La Vie
2022	Call My Name				C'est La Vie
2023	Own God				C'est La Vie
2023	C'est la Vie				C'est la Vie
2023	Symphony				C'est La Vie

*Did not appear in the official Belgian Ultratop 50 charts, but rather in the bubbling under Ultratip charts.
**Did not appear in the official Belgian Ultratop 50 charts nor the bubbling under Ultratip charts, but was registered in the Ultratip charts as an extra tip.

=== Other charting songs ===
Year	Title	Charts	Album
Year	Title	FRA	Album
2018	Be High With Me	179	HH

=== Songwriting ===
- 2020: Ali – Paris me dit (Yalla ya helo!) – (Finalist for Eurovision France, c'est vous qui décidez! for selecting representative to Eurovision Song Contest
