= Grave Encounters =

2011 film by the Vicious Brothers

- Theatrical release poster
- Directed by: The Vicious Brothers
- Written by: The Vicious Brothers
- Produced by: Shawn Angelski; Michael Karlin
- Starring: Sean Rogerson; Ashleigh Gryzko; Mackenzie Gray; Juan Riedinger; Merwin Mondesir; Matthew K McBride
- Cinematography: Tony Mirza
- Edited by: The Vicious Brothers
- Music by: Quynne Craddock
- Production companies: Darclight; Twin Engine Films; Digital Interference Productions
- Distributed by: Tribeca Film
- Release date: April 22, 2011 (Tribeca Film Festival)
- Running time: 95 minutes
- Country: Canada
- Language: English
- Budget: $120,000
- Box office: $5.4 million

Grave Encounters is a 2011 Canadian found footage supernatural horror film written and directed by the Vicious Brothers. The film stars Sean Rogerson, Ashleigh Gryzko, Merwin Mondesir, Mackenzie Gray, and Juan Riedinger as the crew of a successful paranormal reality television series who lock themselves in a supposedly haunted psychiatric hospital to search for evidence of paranormal activity as they shoot what ends up becoming the series' final episode.

Grave Encounters premiered on April 22, 2011, at the Tribeca Film Festival and was released through video on demand, with a simultaneous limited theatrical release in the United States, on August 25, 2011. It was a commercial success, grossing over $5 million against a $120,000 budget, and received mixed reviews from critics. The film has garnered a cult following since its release, with a sequel released in 2012.

== Plot ==
Grave Encounters was a successful paranormal reality television series that was canceled after five episodes following the crew's disappearance. Series' producer Jerry Hartfield presents raw scenes from recovered footage of the sixth and final episode.

The Grave Encounters crew—ghost hunter Lance Preston, occult specialist Sasha Parker, surveillance operator Matt White, cameraman T.C. Gibson, and fake psychic medium Houston Gray—is invited to examine the abandoned Collingwood Psychiatric Hospital, where unexplained phenomena have been reported for years. The hospital's caretaker Kenny Sandoval takes the crew on a day tour and explains the hospital's history, particularly of Dr. Arthur Friedkin, who performed unethical experiments and lobotomies on the hospital's patients before being killed by them.

As night falls, the crew lock themselves inside the hospital to begin their investigation, set up their base camp near the main entrance and position cameras throughout the hospital. No paranormal activity seems to occur within the first few hours until T. C. captures a door slamming behind him. Houston attempts to establish contact with the invisible entities responsible for this demonstration, but the incidents soon become more flagrant and hostile. The crew begin to repack in preparation for Kenny's return; Matt sets out alone to retrieve the cameras and disappears.

When neither Matt nor Kenny return, the crew forces the front doors open, but discover that they lead to another hallway, as well as to other false exits. They also note that it is still night time outside the hospital despite their clocks indicating that it is past morning. In their search for an exit, the crew encounter a girl whose face demonically distorts. As they flee in fear, Houston gets lost and is strangled by an invisible force, before being killed by a flash of light. The remaining crew members also discover that they have been fitted with identification bracelets bearing their names. They eventually find Matt, wearing a hospital gown and having gone mad; he mumbles nonsense about his apparent mental disorders, and explains that the only means of escape is to be "cured" by the hospital's residents. T. C. is suddenly pulled into a blood-filled bathtub by a ghost and disappears afterwards while Matt throws himself down an elevator shaft as Lance and Sasha are attacked by a demon.

Lance and Sasha enter the hospital's tunnels in search for an exit. Sasha falls ill and is abducted by a mist as she and Lance sleep; a terrified and unstable Lance wanders the tunnels alone and feeds on live rats to survive. He finds a door leading into Friedkin's operating room, which contains an altar and evidence of satanic rituals and black magic. Lance turns to see Friedkin's ghost and several nurses, who drag a screaming Lance to an operation table. The camera cuts out for a few moments before it is turned back on by a lobotomized Lance, who proclaims that he is now cured and allowed to leave before the footage ends.

== Cast ==
- Sean Rogerson as Lance Preston
- Ashleigh Gryzko as Sasha Parker
- Merwin Mondesir as T. C. Gibson
- Mackenzie Gray as Houston Grey
- Fred Keating as Gary Crawford
- Juan Riedinger as Matt White
- Ben Wilkinson as Jerry Hartfield
- Arthur Corber as Dr. Arthur Friedkin
- Bob Rathie as Kenny Sandoval
- Matthew K. McBride as Spiritual Force
- Michele Cummins as Bathtub Demon
- Shawn Macdonald as Morgan Turner
- Max Train as Punk Guy
- Marita Eason as Punk Girl

== Production ==
=== Development ===
"[...] it's always a question with a found-footage movie of 'why are they filming to begin with?' And it just seemed like a perfect thing because obviously if it's a TV crew that's trying to capture ghost-like activity that's actually happening, they're gonna want to keep rolling and keep shooting even when things can get kinda bad. So it's just a perfect concept."

— Stuart Ortiz on using a paranormal reality show as a basis for a found-footage horror film

Grave Encounters was produced in collaboration with American Express, Digital Interference, Twin Engine Films, and Darclight. The film was written and directed by the Vicious Brothers, Colin Minihan and Stuart Ortiz. The pair sought to create a project in the horror genre, and in order to maintain a low budget, decided to utilise "the mockumentary format" at a time when found-footage horror films such as Paranormal Activity (2007) were achieving commercial success. According to Minihan, he and Ortiz wondered, "why has no one made a fucking found-footage film out of these ghost-hunting shows?"

Minihan and Ortiz wrote a script for the film roughly 85 pages in length, though they allowed the members of the cast to improvise during filming.

=== Filming ===
Grave Encounters was filmed in Riverview Hospital, a mental institute in Coquitlam, British Columbia; the hospital has served as a location for a number of other television and film productions.

=== Visual effects ===
A number of visual effects in the film were accomplished using computer-generated imagery (CGI). One sequence, in which Houston is thrown across a room, was initially filmed as a practical effect using a stunt performer. Upon reviewing the footage of the stunt performer being "thrown", Minihan and Ortiz were dissatisfied with the result; they then asked the performer to run, jump, and fall to the ground several times, and completed the final effect in post-production.

=== Alternative ending ===
Years after the film's release, the Vicious Brothers released an extended ending, which is available to view on YouTube. A camera crew interviews several parties concerning the Grave Encounters crew's disappearances and the recovered footage. Kenny Sandoval arrived on-time to unlock the hospital the morning after the crew entered, only to find the damage done to the main doors and no trace of the crew except for the lobotomized Lance. The incident at the hospital is currently under criminal investigation by the police; the chief in charge of the investigation believes the crew's footage to be a hoax which they made, but is unable to explain what happened to Lance. Lance has been institutionalized due to his permanently impaired state. The crew attempt to interview Lance, which causes him to fly into a state of frantic terror, screaming that he doesn't want to be on camera anymore, while orderlies restrain him.

== Release ==
A teaser trailer for the film was first uploaded to YouTube in December 2010. The trailer went viral, garnering over 1.5 million views in three months. The film's distribution rights were acquired by Tribeca Film.

Grave Encounters premiered on April 22, 2011, at the Tribeca Film Festival. It had its Italian premiere on June 1, 2011, via distributor Eagle Pictures, under the title ESP Fenomeni Paranormali. The film was released in the United States on August 25, 2011 in select theaters using the Eventful Demand It and video on demand via Comcast.

== Reception ==
=== Critical response ===
On Rotten Tomatoes, the film holds an approval rating of 65% based on 17 reviews, with an average rating of 5.7/10. Metacritic, which uses a weighted average, assigned the film a score of 33 out of 100, based on 4 critics, indicating "generally unfavorable" reviews.

In her review of the film for The New York Times, Jeannette Catsoulis wrote: "Following in the stampeding footsteps of The Blair Witch Project and the Paranormal Activity franchise, the filmmakers seem unaware that they're beating a dead horse." Mike Hale, also writing for The New York Times, felt that the film's "claustrophobic, infrared images, supposedly taken from the tapes of a TV crew that spent the night in a mental hospital, offer some real scares, though the movie starts to feel long and repetitious before its 92 minutes are over." Nick Schager of Slant Magazine gave the film a score of one-and-a-half out of four stars, writing that it "can't even pretend to be anything other than hopelessly derivative." Aaron Hillis, in a negative review of the film for The Village Voice, concluded: "Windows quietly open, wheelchairs roll, faces contort into cheesy CGI ghouls, and 'digital artifacts' cover up the low-budget seams. But true terror needs at least some authenticity. That's perhaps too much to ask of a faked movie about a faked reality show that still can't scare up a fresh idea."

Conversely, Jon Reiss of the New York Press called Grave Encounters the "scariest film since The Ring." Dennis Harvey, in his review of the film for Variety, wrote that its "creepiness factor is sufficient to rate this a notch above genre average". Vox's Dylan Scott recommended the film, writing that it "effectively spoof[s] those ghost hunter shows that were briefly a hot trend, while still building toward a genuinely suspenseful second half." Meagan Navarro, in a positive review of the film for Bloody Disgusting, wrote that "the filmmakers toss subtlety out the window in favor of fun, in your face chills that stick their landing." Felicity Burton of Scream magazine wrote that, had the film "kept to the subtle scares, and dumped the CGI ghosts, it would have been a lot better", but concluded: "If you still haven't had your fill of found footage films, it's definitely worth a watch."

== Other media ==
=== Sequel ===
A sequel titled Grave Encounters 2, written by the Vicious Brothers and directed by John Poliquin, was released on October 2, 2012. In May 2015, the Vicious Brothers announced plans for a third installment, entitled Grave Encounters 3: The Beginning, but it never went into production.

=== Reboot ===
In September 2025, it was announced that an American reboot is in development, with Justin Long set to star, as well as produce alongside Kate Bosworth and the Vicious Brothers. The reboot aims to "modernize the concept into a cinematic experience, heightening the dread, claustrophobia, and psychological terror that made the original a fan favorite".

== See also ==
- Gonjiam: Haunted Asylum, a 2018 South Korean film with a similar premise
- List of ghost films
