= R. J. Fetherstonhaugh =

Canadian Actor

- Born: Richard John Fetherstonhaugh; Victoria, British Columbia, Canada
- Occupation: Actor
- Years active: 2014–present

R. J. Fetherstonhaugh is a Canadian actor. He is known for his portrayal of Nolan Gallard in 21 Thunder.

== Early years ==
Fetherstonhaugh was born in Victoria, British Columbia and spent his childhood focused on athletics; he spent three years training in boxing in high school before deciding to pursue acting. He graduated from the Vancouver Film School in 2013.

In an interview, he credited his mother for pushing him towards acting:

"My parents and I had a talk about my future, they were concerned about the physical trauma that comes with contact sports. I never saw boxing as a career path and frankly at that point in my life I didn't see any career path. My mother suggested I try acting and I fell in love with it. I've always been a bit of a storyteller so this line of work felt right."

== Acting career ==
His first acting credits came in short films Mob Kingdom and Flying Embri in 2014. Later that year, he appeared in Supernatural episode Stairway to Heaven as Colonel Scoop's Employee. He featured in two episodes of When The Heart Calls in 2015 and earned a six-episode role as Sean in Wayward Pines a year later.

Fetherstonhaugh's first full-length movie appearance came as Justin Abraham in Kevan Funk's Hello Destroyer – which premiered at 2016 Toronto International Film Festival. He next appeared in television film Revenge Porn, as well as the series Dead of Summer.

In 2017, Fetherstonhaugh appeared in one episode of Somewhere Between as Blake Tanner before landing a leading role in 21 Thunder as Nolan Gallard. In 2018, he played featured roles in the films The Predator and How It Ends.

In 2021, Fetherstonhaugh worked in season two of Batwoman as Amygdala.

== Filmography ==
=== Film ===
Year	Title	Role	Notes
2014	Mob Kingdom	Lance DuLac	Short
2014	Flying Embri	Cash	Short
2018	The Predator	Agent Church	
2018	How It Ends	Soldier	
2018	Freaks	Police Officer	
2019	Recon	Heisman	
2022	Lou	Gerry	
2025	F*** Marry Kill	Jake	

=== Television ===
Year	Title	Role	Notes
2014	Supernatural	Colonel Scoop's employee	Episode: "Stairway to Heaven"
2015	When the Heart Calls	Luke McCoy	2 episodes
2015–2016	Wayward Pines	Sean	6 episodes
2016	Dead of Summer	Younger Keith Jones	Episode: "The Dharma Bums"
2016	Noches con Platanito	Himself	Guest role
2016	Revenge Porn	Dominic	Television film
2017	21 Thunder	Nolan Gallard	Main role
2017	Somewhere Between	Blake Tanner	Episode: "One Must Die"
2019	Project Blue Book	Corporal James Vaughn	Episode: "War Games"
2020–2022	Snowpiercer	Jackboot Clifford	12 episodes
2021	Batwoman	Amygdala	Episode: "Do Not Resuscitate"
2024	Alert: Missing Persons Unit	Dante D'Andrea	Episode: "Gemma & Isabel"
