= Hypnotic (2021 film) =

- Official Netflix poster
- Directed by: Matt Angel; Suzanne Coote
- Written by: Richard D'Ovidio
- Produced by: Michael J. Luisi
- Starring: Kate Siegel; Jason O'Mara; Dulé Hill
- Cinematography: John S. Stanley
- Edited by: Brian Ufberg
- Music by: Nathan Matthew David
- Production company: The Long Game
- Distributed by: Netflix
- Release date: October 27, 2021
- Running time: 88 minutes
- Country: United States
- Language: English

Hypnotic is a 2021 American thriller film directed by Matt Angel and Suzanne Coote, written by Richard D'Ovidio and starring Kate Siegel, Jason O'Mara, and Dulé Hill. It was released on October 27, 2021, by Netflix.

== Plot ==
In an elevator, a woman named Andrea receives a phone call telling her, "This is how the world ends." She begins crying as the walls appear to close in on her.

Software engineer Jenn attends a party hosted by her friend, Gina. There, Jenn meets a psychotherapist named Dr. Meade. On Gina's recommendation, Jenn sets up an appointment with Dr. Meade to discuss how her relationship with Brian ended after a still birth. Meade suggests hypnotherapy. After an hour of hypnosis, Jenn feels like it only lasted several minutes and cannot remember it. That night, Jenn dreams of Meade lying with her in bed.

Jenn encounters Meade while grocery shopping, and they go out for coffee. He reveals that he is a widower, having previously been married to a woman named Amy. Meade also suggests that Jenn invite Brian to her place to have dinner. Jenn immediately enters a trance and wakes up at home at the dining table. After hearing choking in the bathroom, she finds Brian lying in the bathtub and rushes him to the hospital. After a meeting with Meade in which Jenn expresses guilt over Brian, she returns home and finds a grocery list containing sesame oil, which Brian is allergic to, and recalls talking with Meade on the phone at the store.

After an investigation on Meade reveals a criminal record and complaints from his patients, Jenn and Gina go to the police and meet Detective Rollins, who shows them security footage of Andrea having a heart attack in the elevator. Gina then confesses that she also has been hypnotized by Meade. Jenn sets up another session with Meade, planning to record the meeting. After the session, she plays the recording and finds that she confessed her plan as well as her knowledge of Andrea. While on a phone call with Jenn, Gina receives the same call Andrea did and hallucinates a tarantula crawling on her coat. She crashes the car, killing herself and her husband.

Rollins lifts Meade's fingerprints and visits Jenn's house to warn her. He returns home and is suddenly attacked by a knife-wielding woman who is a patient of Meade. He subdues her and is sent to the hospital. Jenn visits him and asks if another hypnotherapist can uncover what Meade did to her. Rollins recommends her to Stella, a police hypnotherapist. Stella hypnotises Jenn, but she begins convulsing after being asked to recollect events. Stella concludes that Meade planted a fail-safe into Jenn's mind.

In a dream, Jenn remembers a house address and Meade speaking about his mentor, Dr. Xavier Sullivan. Jenn goes to the house and finds photos of Meade with his ex-wife, who looks similar to her. Meade sneaks up behind her and reveals that Xavier was his father, from whom he inherited the house. He then hypnotises Jenn into falling asleep. From the fingerprints, Rollins learns that Meade's real name is Julian Sullivan. Meade wakes Jenn, who is paralysed, and proposes to her. Jenn then realizes that Meade has planted memories into her to replace his dead wife. Rollin's arrives at Xavier's house, and a fight ensues. After shooting at them, Jenn wakes up to Rollins comforting her, addressing her as "my love". Jenn learns that Stella placed a counter-trigger where if Meade ever refers to her as "my love", the fail-safe in Jenn's mind will be eliminated. Jenn is freed from her trance and sees that it is actually Meade holding her. She breaks away from him and sees that she accidentally shot Rollins. Rollins informs Jenn of a gun in his ankle holster, and she uses it to kill Meade.

A month later, Jenn is at the hospital with Brian, and Rollins has been promoted. Rollins gifts Jenn a CD titled "Better Sleep with Hypnosis".

== Cast ==
- Kate Siegel as Jenn Tompson
- Jason O'Mara as Dr. Collin Meade
- Dulé Hill as Detective Wade Rollins
- Lucie Guest as Gina Kelman
- Jaime M. Callica as Brian Rawley
- Tanja Dixon-Warren as Dr. Stella Graham
- Luc Roderique as Scott Kelman
- Devyn Dalton as Tabby
- Stephanie Cudmore as Andrea Bowen
- Jessie Fraser as Amy
- Darien Martin as Squad Leader
- Madeleine Kelders as Female Executive

== Reception ==
On the review aggregator website Rotten Tomatoes, 24% of 21 critics' reviews are positive, with an average rating of 4.3/10. On Metacritic, Hypnotic holds a score of 33 out of 100 based on 5 critics, indicating "generally unfavorable" reviews.

The Guardian's Benjamin Lee gave the film 1/5 stars, writing, "For someone under the spell, an hour can feel like a minute, an enviable experience for anyone actually watching Hypnotic, an unrewarding slog being fished out of the garbage for Halloween no tricks or treats, just tripe." Christy Lemire, writing for RogerEbert.com, gave it 1/4 stars. She said the film "only occasionally rises to the potential of its wild premise, thanks mostly to a crazy-eyed, licking-his-chops performance from Jason O'Mara. He knows exactly what kind of material he's working with here. For the most part, though, Hypnotic is dopey, but never quite dopey enough."

G. Allan Johnson of the San Francisco Chronicle was more positive, saying the film was "the kind of made-for-cable-level movie where a pedestrian script... with the usual horror cliches is elevated by strong acting, no-nonsense direction and a couple of neat twists." Lena Wilson of The New York Times wrote, "While the resulting cat-and-mouse dynamic is predictable, particularly if you've ever watched a Lifetime movie, Hypnotic takes its cartoonishness to admirable heights."
