= Sean Rogerson =

Canadian actor and former photomodel (born 1977)

- Born: September 30, 1977 (age 48); Sherwood Park, Alberta, Canada
- Occupations: Actor, model
- Known for: Grave Encounters; Grave Encounters 2

Sean Rogerson (born September 30, 1977) is a Canadian actor and former photomodel, known for his role as Lance Preston in the horror films, Grave Encounters and Grave Encounters 2.

== Filmography ==
- 2004: Tru Calling (TV Series) - The Longest Day (Harrison's Buddy #1)
- 2005: The Collector (TV Series) - The Tour Guide (Brian Mars)
- 2005: Dead Zone (TV Series) - A Very Dead Zone Christmas (Smalltime Drug Dealer)
- 2006: Underworld Evolution - Death Dealer #2
- 2006: The Perfect Suspect (TV Series) Sam Lee
- 2007: Stargate Atlantis (TV Series) Travelers (Nevik)
- 2007: Blood Ties (TV Series) The Good, the Bad and the Ugly (Charles)
- 2007: Supernatural (TV Series) Houses of the Holy (Man)
- 2009: Harper's Island (TV Series) (Joel Booth)
- 2009: One By One: The Making of 'Harper's Island (Video Short) (Joel Booth)
- 2009: Casting 'Harper's Island (Video Short) (Joel Booth)
- 2010: Fringe (TV Series) Johari Window (Glen Brown)
- 2010: Psych (TV Series) You Can't Handle This Episode (Lt. Wallach)
- 2010: Smallville (TV Series) Conspiracy (Lenkov)
- 2011: Fairly Legal (TV Series) Pilot (Brian Michaels)
- 2011: Grave Encounters (Lance Preston)
- 2011: Supernatural (TV Series) How to Win Friends and Influence Monsters (Ranger Rick Evans)
- 2012: Grave Encounters 2 (Lance Preston/Himself)
- 2013: 12 Rounds 2: Reloaded (Sykes)
- 2017: Concrete Evidence: Fixer Upper Mysteries (Sean Brogans)
- 2018: Deadly Deed: Fixer Upper Mysteries (Sean Brogans)
- 2019: Z (Kevin)
- 2026: Bodycam (Officer Bryce)
