= Stephanie Bennett (actress) =

Canadian actress (active 2010– )

- Born: Vancouver, British Columbia, Canada
- Occupation: Actress
- Years active: 2010–present
- Spouse: Sebastian Gacki (2022)

Stephanie Bennett is a Canadian actress. She is known for her roles in the film Leprechaun: Origins (2014) and the series Shadowhunters (2016–2017).

== Career ==
Bennett portrayed Dee Taggart on the 2015 CBC spy drama The Romeo Section. She also appeared in the 2015 Disney Channel television film Descendants as Snow White. Her other acting credits include the films Grave Encounters 2 and Leprechaun: Origins, and appearances on television series Supernatural and iZombie. She appeared as Lydia Branwell in the Freeform fantasy television series Shadowhunters from 2016–2017.

In September 2016, CBC announced it had commissioned a one-hour drama series that follows the star players of an under-21 soccer academy in Montreal, titled 21 Thunder, with Bennett cast as one of the three lead characters. The series premiered on July 31, 2017 in Canada to positive reviews. In 2017, Bennett played the role of Jenny in Season 2 of the Showcase/Netflix sci-fi series Travelers.

== Filmography ==
Film roles
Year	Title	Role	Notes
2012	Grave Encounters 2	Tessa Hamill	
2014	Leprechaun: Origins	Sophie Roberts	
2014	Big Eyes	Coed #1	
2018	Scorched Earth	Melena	

Television roles
Year	Title	Role	Notes
2011	Hiccups	Double Parked Woman	Episode: "Flirt Locker"
2013	Supernatural	Shelly	Episode: "Clip Show"
2013	King & Maxwell	Angela Miller	Episode: "Stealing Secrets"
2014	Signed, Sealed, Delivered	Abby Wheeler	Episode: "Dark of Night"
2014	The Nine Lives of Christmas	Jaclyn	Television film
2015	Truth & Lies	Hannah	Television film; also known as Text to Kill
2015	iZombie	Kimber Cooper	Episode: "Dead Rat, Live Rat, Brown Rat, White Rat"
2015	UnREAL	Pepper	Recurring role, 5 episodes
2015	Descendants	Snow White	Television film
2015	The Unauthorized Full House Story	Lori Loughlin	Television film
2015	Stolen Dreams	Rebecca	Television film; U.S. cable TV title: Are You My Daughter?
2015	The Romeo Section	Dee Taggart	Main role (season 1), 10 episodes (CBC)
2016–2017	Shadowhunters	Lydia Branwell	Recurring role (seasons 1–2), 9 episodes
2016	Motive	Miranda Hurst	Episode: "The Scorpion and the Frog"
2017	Lucifer	Muffy	Episode: "Mr. and Mrs. Mazikeen Smith"
2017	21 Thunder	Christy Cook	Main role
2017	Travelers	Jenny	Recurring role (season 2), 4 episodes
2018	The Christmas Pact	Hannah	Television film
2019	Project Blue Book	Leigh-Ann	Episode: "Lubbock Lights"
2019	Valentine in the Vineyard	Shay Michaels	Television film (Hallmark)
2020	Lonestar Christmas	Erin	Television film (Hallmark)
2021	The Nine Kittens of Christmas	Jaclyn	Television film (Hallmark)
2021	Secrets in the Wilderness	Lisa	Television film (LMN); originally titled Remote Danger
2022	Listen Out for Love	Peyton Pepper	Television film (UP tv)
2022	Yellowstone Romance	Olivia	Television film (UP tv)
2022	Christmas Class Reunion	Samantha	Television film (Hallmark)
2023	Wedding Season	Trish	Television film (Hallmark)
2023	A Perfect Christmas Carol	Carol	TV film
2025	Another Sweet Christmas	Jenny	

== Awards and nominations ==
Year	Award	Category	Title	Result	Ref.
2016	Leo Awards	Best Supporting Performance by a Female in a Television Movie	Stolen Dreams	Won	
