= Hardwired (film) =

- DVD cover
- Directed by: Ernie Barbarash
- Written by: Mike Hurst
- Produced by: Christine Haebler; Kirk Shaw
- Starring: Cuba Gooding Jr.; Michael Ironside; Tatiana Maslany; Juan Riedinger; Lance Henriksen; Val Kilmer
- Cinematography: Stephen Jackson
- Edited by: Gordon Williams
- Music by: Schaun Tozer
- Production companies: Stage 6 Films; Insight Film Studios; Motion Picture Corporation of America
- Distributed by: Sony Pictures Home Entertainment
- Release date: November 3, 2009
- Running time: 94 minutes
- Country: United States
- Language: English
- Budget: $5 million

Hardwired is a 2009 American science fiction action film directed by Ernie Barbarash, written by Mike Hurst, and starring Cuba Gooding Jr. and Val Kilmer. The film was released on direct-to-DVD in the United States on November 3, 2009.

== Plot ==
In the not-too-distant future where corporations control nearly every aspect of human life, a man named Luke Gibson is involved in a car accident that claims the life of his wife and their unborn child. Luke has severe brain damage, but Hope Corporation agrees to implant a chip into his brain to save his life. He discovers that this chip also constantly sends advertisements until either the person obtains the product, or they go insane. While trying to figure out why they did this to him and who he is, he finds out that the chip is a test product with a fail-safe that could kill him. He succumbs to the effects but the Corporation fears that their test might be discovered, and they decide to activate the fail-safe. Just before it goes off, a group of underground hackers led by Hal and "Keyboard" hack into the chip and save his life.

After using the chip to guide him away from Hope Corp. pursuers, they agree to try to help him remember who he is in exchange for assisting in their fight against Hope Corp. They show him that his accident was no accident but actually planned by Hope Corp. so they could use him as a test subject. He agrees to help but is captured during the attempt and taken to a facility controlled by Hope Corp. Luke, with the help of Punk Red and Punk Blue, manages to fight his way to the leader of the project, Virgil Kirkhill. Virgil is killed after a short confrontation, and Luke escapes. He meets up with "Red" and "Blue" (the only remaining members of the underground group). Together they vow to continue the fight until Hope Corporation is destroyed.

== Cast ==
- Cuba Gooding Jr. as Luke Gibson
- Val Kilmer as Virgil Kirkhill
- Michael Ironside as Hal
- Tatiana Maslany as Punk Red
- Eric Breker as Robert Drake
- Juan Riedinger as Punk Blue
- Chad Krowchuk as Keyboard
- Terry Chen as Carter Burke
- Hiro Kanagawa as Dr. Steckler
- Rachel Luttrell as Candace
- Donny Lucas as Bennett
- Ali Liebert as Catalina Jones
- Monica Mustelier as Veronica "Ronnie" Gibson
- Julius Chapple as Lewis
- Sunita Prasad as Nurse Price
- Lance Henriksen as Hope (Uncredited: Henriksen appears only in a still frame at the end of the film and the still is taken from an episode of the television show Millennium.)

== Production ==
Ironside was originally offered Kilmer's role, Virgil Kirkhill, but he declined, as he wanted to stretch his acting beyond playing imposing antagonists. Ironside said that he was originally drawn to the script based on the Matrix-style themes.

== Reception ==
David Nusair of ReelFilm panned the film, stating, "Hardwired inevitably establishes itself as just another sloppy, run-of-the-mill direct-to-video actioner – with Cuba Gooding Jr's presence in the central role ultimately more sad than anything else." Scifi Movie Page also negatively reviewed the movie, writing that "Hardwired is cheesy, seriously cheesy." Steve Power of DVD Verdict wrote, "Amazingly, Hardwired isn't completely terrible."
