= 21 Thunder =

Canadian television drama series

- Promotional image for the show's release on Netflix
- Genre: Sports drama
- Created by: Adrian Wills; Kenneth Hirsch; Riley Adams
- Starring: RJ Fetherstonhaugh; Stephanie Bennett; Emmanuel Kabongo; Andres Joseph; Conrad Pla; Ryan Pierce; Clark Backo; Eileen Li
- Country of origin: Canada
- Original language: English
- No. of seasons: 1
- No. of episodes: 8

Production
- Production locations: Montreal, Quebec, Canada
- Running time: 44 minutes
- Production companies: PMA Productions; Generic Productions

Original release
- Network: CBC Television
- Release: July 31 – September 18, 2017

21 Thunder is a Canadian television drama series which follows star players of an under-21 academy for the fictional Montreal Thunder soccer team in Montreal, Quebec. The series was created by Adrian Wills, Riley Adams, and Kenneth Hirsch in 2016. It features an ensemble cast that includes, among others, RJ Fetherstonhaugh, Colm Feore, Stephanie Bennett, Emmanuel Kabongo, and Conrad Pla. The series aired in Canada on CBC Television beginning July 31, 2017, to generally positive reviews.

21 Thunder was released in all other countries worldwide on March 1, 2018, as a Netflix Original Series by Netflix although it was removed in March 2022. It received generally positive international reception.

== Background ==
The creators of the show—Adrian Wills, Riley Adams, and Kenneth Hirsch—briefly considered focusing their series on basketball or hockey, before settling on soccer. Hirsch explained this decision in an interview with the Montreal Gazette:

We realized very quickly that every Canadian can relate one way or another to soccer. Either you play it or you watch it ... Also, look at any soccer field across Canada and that field reflects huge diversity, of cultural background, of different segments of society.

In September 2016, CBC announced it had commissioned a one-hour drama series that would follow the star players of an under-21 soccer academy in Montreal. The series was filmed on location, in Montreal, throughout 2016. Later, in a press release, CBC stated that the series will "offer audiences a fresh and diverse perspective on the world's most popular sport."

== Cast ==
=== Main ===
- RJ Fetherstonhaugh as Nolan Gallard
- Stephanie Bennett as Christy Cook
- Emmanuel Kabongo as Junior Lolo
- Andres Joseph as Alex el Haddadi
- Conrad Pla as Albert Rocas
- Ryan Pierce as Davey Gunn
- Clark Backo as Emma Lavigueur
- Eileen Li as Lara Yun

=== Recurring ===
- Kyle Mac as Special K
- Colm Feore as Declan Gallard
- Kevin Claydon as Stefan Arnaud
- Jonathan Kim as James Tran
- Kimberly Laferriere as Marie Tremblay
- Gabrielle Graham as Fatima Gossa
- Thamela Mpumlwana as Sly Lolo
- Cristina Rosato as Ana Messina
- Sarah Booth as Cheyenne

== Episodes ==
No.	Title	Directed by	Written by	Original release date
1	"Pilot"	Jim Donovan	Riley Adams	July 31, 2017
Junior makes his bones on the team and Nolan's past returns with a vengeance.
2	"Road Game"	Jim Donovan	Riley Adams	August 7, 2017
Christy confronts family truths, Nolan is blackmailed, and Lara flirts with temptation
3	"Freefalling"	Charles Officer	Malcolm MacRury	August 14, 2017
Nolan's father tries to save him and Junior faces down Bamba.
4	"Fixed"	Charles Officer	Amanda Fahey	August 21, 2017
Lara prepares to fix a game, Christy proves a master strategist, and Nolan dreams of revenge.
5	"Heaven or Hell"	Jerry Ciccoritti	Riley Adams and Seneca Aaron	August 28, 2017
Christy and Nolan suffer humiliation on the field, Junior wins glory.
6	"War"	Charles Officer	Ellen Vanstone	September 4, 2017
Junior unmasks an imposter and Nolan's father betrays him.
7	"Together We Part"	Jerry Ciccoritti	Malcolm MacRury and Stephanie Tracey	September 11, 2017
Christy takes over the team. Nolan sacrifices himself to try and save Emma.
8	"Rock and a Hard Place"	Jerry Ciccoritti	Riley Adams	September 18, 2017
Christy fights back against all odds, and Nolan makes the ultimate choice.

== Reception ==
Upon its release in Canada, the series received generally positive reviews; John Doyle of The Globe and Mail called it "highly enjoyable and addictive, even if you're just a casual soccer fan." Further, Doyle wrote that "It's an excellent melodrama that reaches into the lavishly exotic and coarse world of club soccer and pulls out stories and characters that are believable and compelling. ...it's not the male-centric drama you might expect. There is a sharp edge to the female characters. Mostly it is fast, action-packed, sort-of realistic and gripping. It's fine entertainment, and it's one of those dramas about sports that succeeds."

After the fourth episode, Greg David of TV, eh? wrote: "I said off the top how pleasantly surprised I've been with 21 Thunder's first season. The writing is taut and the characters are anything but cookie-cutter; 21 Thunder has turned into my sleeper hit of the summer."

Johanna Schneller of the Toronto Star wrote a less enthusiastic review, in which she claimed that the series "has promise, but not many kicks," concluding that "the show is freshest when it keeps its head in the game."

With its international launch on Netflix in March 2018, Vanity Fair included 21 Thunder in its "A-List: What to Watch in March". In her review of April 3, 2018, Rebecca Farley of Refinery29 calls 21 Thunder "Canada's answer to the Gossip Girl, and writes of the characters: "Now that they're all approaching 21, they have to either launch professional soccer careers or pivot into something more sustainable. Ergo, internal conflict. Ergo, external conflict. Ergo, sexual relations catalyzed by external conflict. The soccer shirts will be removed, declarations of love will happen on porches (and in the physical therapy room, and on the soccer field), and, heck, an arsonist might make a guest appearance! This show really does have everything, including a much-needed dose of diversity."
