= Drawing Home =

2017 American film

- Directed by: Markus Rupprecht
- Written by: Donna Logan; Markus Rupprecht
- Produced by: Margarethe Baillou; Allan Neuwirth
- Starring: Julie Lynn Mortensen; Juan Riedinger; Kate Mulgrew; Rutger Hauer; Peter Strauss; Wallace Shawn
- Cinematography: Patrick McLaughlin
- Edited by: Ian Blume
- Music by: Ben Holiday
- Production companies: M.Y.R.A. Entertainment; Fresh Dog Productions
- Distributed by: M.Y.R.A. Entertainment
- Release dates: November 2, 2016 (Banff Mountain Film and Book Festival); December 1, 2017
- Running time: 112 minutes
- Countries: United States; Canada
- Language: English

Drawing Home is a 2017 Canadian-American adventure romantic drama film written by Donna Logan and Markus Rupprecht, directed by Rupprecht and starring Julie Lynn Mortensen and Juan Riedinger and featuring Kate Mulgrew, Rutger Hauer, Peter Strauss and Wallace Shawn. The film premiered at the Banff Mountain Film and Book Festival on November 2, 2016, and was released on December 1, 2017.

== Plot ==
Born in Concord, Massachusetts, Catharine Robb grew up amongst the wealth and privilege of the East Coast elite. While studying at the Boston Museum of Fine Arts in the 1920s, she meets Peter Whyte, a fellow art student from Banff, born into a middle class family. It is love at first sight. Ending her relationship with her current beau, John D. Rockefeller III, she and Peter begin a secret love affair, overcoming incredible geographical obstacles — and even stormier disapproval from Catharine's mother Edith Morse Robb — to be together and eventually marry.

Once settled in Banff, Catharine takes to Peter's lifestyle immediately, living in a log cabin with the barest of necessities and founding the now world-famous Skoki Ski Lodge. Living among the natural splendor of Banff National Park, the pair pursues a life of painting, photography, hiking and skiing. Their home becomes a meeting place for artist friends like famed wildlife painter Carl Rungius, members of the Group of Seven, and many local pioneers and neighbors from the Stoney First Nation.

Their idyllic life is not without suffering. Tragedy strikes when one of their Skoki Lodge guests, young MIT mathematician Kit Paley, dies in an avalanche after wandering off alone, despite warnings by the Whytes. Although found innocent of any responsibility, Peter takes the accident very hard and begins drinking to ease his conscience. Shortly thereafter, he is diagnosed with cataracts in both eyes, limiting his ability to paint. The knowledge that he is going blind increases Peter’s depression and continued alcoholism, and although Catharine does what she can, her husband's condition causes a great strain on their relationship.

== Cast ==
- Julie Lynn Mortensen as Catharine Robb Whyte
- Juan Riedinger as Peter Whyte
- Kate Mulgrew as Edith Morse Robb
- Kristin Griffith as Jean Caird
- Rutger Hauer as Carl Rungius
- Peter Strauss as Russell Robb Sr.
- Torrance Coombs as Kit Paley
- Christian Campbell as Cliff Whyte
- Wallace Shawn as Mr. Garfield
- Jeff Gladstone as John D. Rockefeller III
- Judith Buchan as Annie Whyte
- John Treleaven as Dave Whyte
- Helmer Twoyoungmen as Mark Poucette

== Production ==
Rocky Mountain Outlook reported on the casting of Juan Riedinger as production began, writing, "The story of Peter and Catharine Whyte is the quintessential Banff story and an integral part of the community’s fabric and legacy. And when it comes to Drawing Home, a feature-length film about Peter and Catharine that is currently in production in the Banff-Bow Valley region, who better to play Peter, who was born in Banff in 1905 into the prominent Whyte family, than Banff-born actor Juan Riedinger?"

== Music ==
The theme song "Stars in My Eyes" was performed by Grammy Award-winning recording artist Judy Collins. She was drawn to the project because she hails from the American Rocky Mountains.

Recording took place in New York City.

== Release ==
The film was released on December 1, 2017.

== Reception ==
Helen T. Verongos of The New York Times gave the film a mixed review, praising the look of the film, "A more stunning film landscape than this one, Canada’s Banff National Park in Alberta, is hard to find," but added, "The pacing is uneven, and the movie feels slow in spots and too long overall, even though it lacks detail that would have enriched it."

Sheri Linden of The Hollywood Reporter also gave the film a negative review and wrote, "...director Markus Rupprecht and his co-writer, Donna Logan, never get beyond the handsome period surface to an involving emotional core."

Gary Goldstein of the Los Angeles Times also gave the film a negative review and wrote, "In the same way that not every novel should be made into a movie, not every true-life story warrants the big-screen treatment."
