= Root Film =

- Root Film game cover released in all regions
- Developer: Kadokawa Games
- Publishers: JP: Kadokawa Games; WW: PQube
- Writer: Hifumi Kono
- Platforms: Nintendo Switch, PlayStation 4
- Release: JP: July 30, 2020; WW: March 19, 2021
- Genre: Visual novel
- Mode: Single-player

Root Film is an adventure visual novel video game by Kadokawa Games. The game is a spiritual successor to 2016's Root Letter visual novel and the second entry in the Kadokawa Mystery Games series. The game released on the Nintendo Switch and PlayStation 4 in Japan in July 2020, and on March 19, 2021 in North America and Europe.

== Gameplay ==
The game plays as a murder mystery visual novel; much of the game is spent reading text to advance the story. The core gameplay involves investigating locations by selecting them on a map, to advance the story. In many locations the player can investigate specific sections-these are either areas of the scene they can investigate or characters present in the scene they can talk to.

Yagumo and Riho both have an "Synesthesia" ability that lets them sense when statements and claims are important (during certain gameplay sections this is replaced with the similarly functioning "Magari Memo" ability). The player must press a button to memorize the clue when prompted.

"Max Mode" occurs when Yagumo or Riho interrogates a suspect. During these sections, the player must select the correct clues when prompted. The goal is to fill the "true revealed" gauge, by presenting the correct clues, and to avoid filling the "unresolved" gauge, by presenting the wrong evidence. "Max Mode" is presented in a verbal debate "fighting style", with more dynamic sprites for both Yagumo/Riho and the suspect then the rest of the game, in a style somewhat similar to Ace Attorney.

== Story ==
Similar to its predecessor, Root Letter the game's fictional story takes place in the real-life Shimane Prefecture in Japan. The story follows dual protagonists; Rintaro Yagumo, an aspiring but poor film director, and Riho, an up-and-coming actress who hasn't quite had her breakthrough yet. In the game, a TV series called "Shimane Mystery Drama Project" has been green lit, and both Rintaro and Riho are excited this could be their breakthrough roles. However, a real life murder mysteriously occurs on the set very early on in the process and puts things to a halt, and the two, along with various other crew involved try to find out what happened.

== Development ==
The game is generally considered a sequel or successor to the Root Letter visual novel, grouped together by what is called the Kadokawa Games Mystery series moniker. The two game's stories are unrelated and unconnected, but share thematic similarities, and many voice actors, to give a feeling of a running series. Sequel ideas for Root Letter were being considered as early as late 2016. The game's existence as a formal project was known as early as October 2018, when it was announced under its tentative name Root Letter 2. The game was formally revealed and announced under its official name, Root Film, a year later in October 2019.

The game was originally scheduled for release on April 23, 2020 in Japan, but received a short delay to July 30, 2020. The game was announced for an English localization in September 2020, with an intended Q1 2021 release date, later solidified down to March 19, 2021. A limited-edition version of the game was also announced for its Western release, which includes a 100 page art booklet packaged with the physical copy of the game.

== Reception ==
=== Critical response ===
Reception

Aggregate scores
Aggregator	Score
Metacritic	NS: 70/100; PS4: 70/100
OpenCritic	71% recommend

Review scores
Publication	Score
Adventure Gamers	3.5/5
Famitsu	8/10, 8/10, 8/10, 8/10
Nintendo Life	7/10
Nintendo World Report	5.5/10
Push Square	6/10

The PlayStation 4 and Nintendo Switch versions of Root Film both received "mixed or average" reviews from critics, according to the review aggregation website Metacritic. Fellow review aggregator OpenCritic assessed that the game received strong approval, being recommended by 71% of critics. In Japan, four critics from Famitsu gave Root Film a total score of 32 out of 40, with each critic awarding the game an 8 out of 10.

=== Sales ===
The PS4 version of Root Film debuted at number 30 in the top 30 selling video games of the week with 1679 copies sold. The Switch version charting somewhere under it.
