= Room 203 =

2022 American horror film by Ben Jagger

- Official release poster
- Directed by: Ben Jagger
- Screenplay by: John Poliquin; Nick Richey; Ben Jagger
- Based on: Room 203 by Nanami Kamon
- Produced by: Annmarie Sairrino; Moeko Suzuki; Kat McPhee; Ben Anderson; Eric Gibson
- Starring: Francesca Xuereb; Viktoria Vinyarska; Eric Wiegand; Scott Gremillion
- Cinematography: Joel Froome
- Edited by: J.C. Doler
- Music by: Daniel L.K. Caldwell
- Production company: AMMO Entertainment
- Distributed by: Vertical Entertainment
- Release date: April 15, 2022
- Running time: 103 minutes
- Country: United States
- Language: English
- Box office: $385,236 (worldwide)

Room 203 is a 2022 American horror film directed by Ben Jagger, starring Francesca Xuereb and Viktoria Vinyarska, which centers on two best friends, who have recently moved in together as roommates, and realize that their new apartment is haunted by murderous spirits. Written by John Poliquin, Nick Richey, and Jagger, the film is based on the Japanese novel of the same name written by Nanami Kamon and published by Kobunsha.

Jointly produced by American firm AMMO Entertainment and affiliated Japanese company Ammo Inc., the film was released in the United States by Vertical Entertainment on April 15, 2022, with worldwide sales handled by Voltage Pictures.

== Plot ==
Kim is a young woman about to start college and has decided to move into a newly rented apartment with her best friend, Izzy. Kim’s parents, however, are not at all supportive of this idea, owing to Izzy’s reputation as a troubled young woman whose mother died due to a drug overdose. They warn Kim they will cut off contact with her if she moves in with Izzy. Adamant to support her friend, Kim ignores them and meets Izzy inside the apartment. Soon after, they encounter Ronan, the landlord of the building who gives them a tour and warns them about two crucial tenant rules: do not damage the elaborate stained-glass window in their apartment, and stay out of the basement. Kim and Izzy are mesmerized by the window, which depicts medieval knights killing each other; it's both fascinating and unsettling to them. Kim also sees a small but noticeable hole on the wall of her room and tries to cover it up by hanging a mirror over it, this does not work, as the mirror repeatedly keeps tilting or falls to the ground. Izzy finds an amulet necklace in the hole and begins wearing it, despite Kim finding it creepy that her friend would wear discarded jewellery. That night, Izzy begins sleepwalking; it's revealed she had sleep issues previously, but nothing quite like this that Kim can remember. After a restless night, Kim wakes up late for her college orientation and rushes to the campus.

Kim arrives too late for her orientation, but a friendly student, Ian, gives her a private tour. They bond over their shared passion for journalism, both of which they hope to pursue after college. Kim decides to write a paper in her course on Izzy's fraught family life, but doesn't ask permission from her before doing so. Izzy, meanwhile, begins to act out in increasingly disturbing ways. Although Izzy has always been a free spirit open to partying, Kim is shocked to see her bring first a young man, and then a young woman, back with her to the apartment to spend the night; both then disappear before the morning. Several nights later, Kim is woken up by a fluttering noise and is startled to find a crow in her room. To her dismay, she sees the bird slither into the hole in her wall, which has now grown and somewhat resembles a decomposing wound. Earlier that day, Kim found a metal music box with the names of a couple written inside it; now, just as the crow disappears, Izzy comes to Kim's room and begins banging on the locked door. When Kim opens the door, Izzy is holding the music box, and blood is spilling down from her head; she had been slamming her head against the door to 'knock.' Kim takes care of her and keeps her company that night, and Izzy seems to be normal again the next day. But her sleepwalking episodes continue and grow worse when she wanders down into the basement. Kim recovers her terrified friend and brings her back to the room. Izzy continues to decline, and Kim worries she is losing her friend to mental and emotional distress.

Kim had often seen the landlord, Ronan, watching them and behaving strangely. One day, she finds him in their apartment, staring at the stained-glass window. When he becomes aware of her presence, he reprimands Kim harshly for having gone down to the basement. Kim shares all this with Ian, as well as her concern for Izzy's current state. Ian suggests that she investigates the history of the building. Together, they read up on the internet about a bank manager named Liam McNally who, with his wife Karen, previously lived in the same apartment: Room 203. Decades earlier, shortly after Karen became pregnant, Liam murdered her before killing himself in the apartment. Kim and Ian realize that the names Liam and Karen are the same names inscribed inside the music box that Izzy carried around during her sleepwalking. Kim then identifies the eyewitness who discovered Liam and Karen's bodies: a janitor named Milton Briggs. Meeting with Milton, he reveals that despite Karen's death, the baby she was carrying survived. Ian does his own research into the images present on the stained-glass mural in the apartment, and he connects them to Celtic pagan symbols and finally to the Irish mythology figure Morrigu, who often appears in the form of a crow and symbolises death.

Meanwhile, Izzy stumbles across Kim’s college paper about her. She angrily confronts Kim before storming out. Kim rips open the hole on the wall, and a shriveled, desiccated hand from a dead body falls out of it. Kim recognizes the hand is wearing a distinctive ring: the same ring that the female lover Izzy brought back to the apartment weeks earlier was wearing. Before Kim can react, Ronan storms into the apartment and abducts Kim, revealing that he is the baby that survived, and the amulet Izzy wore belonged to his mother. Ronan is now subject to the curse of the Morrigu, which chooses its victim through the necklace with the cursed amulet. Once a victim is cursed, the Morrigu compels the person to kill both others and themself, but while Izzy has succumbed and killed others (the young man and woman who she brought back to the apartment), Izzy's survival instinct is strong, and she has resisted killing herself, this is likely due to her resilience from her troubled past. Ronan has decided to take matters into his own hands out of fear that Morrigu will come after him if she does not continue to receive her offerings.

Ian rushes to the apartment, where he is killed by a possessed Izzy. Kim manages to escape Ronan before finding Ian's body and following Izzy into the basement. Ronan follows in pursuit. Ronan manages to catch up to her, but before he can kill Kim he is possessed and turns the gun on himself, committing unwilling suicide. Izzy, fighting the Morrigu's possession, experiences rapid personality shifts between her real self, who asks for Kim’s help, and her possessed self, who grins and laughs while trying to goad Kim into killing her. Kim refuses, and Izzy attacks, stabbing her. Just as she is about to kill her, Kim rips off the cursed amulet from Izzy’s neck. The curse lifts, and Izzy, realizing what has nearly happened, breaks down in Kim's arms. The two friends walk up to their apartment with the intention of destroying the stained-glass window, but are spooked when hundreds of crows seem to swarm outside the window. With a scream, Kim finally gathers up the courage to shatter the window. The two escape the apartment, and Izzy rushes Kim to the hospital, hopefully before she will bleed to death. As Kim and Izzy exit the building, behind them, in Room 203, the figure of the Morrigu appears amid the shattered stained-glass.

== Cast ==
- Francesca Xuereb as Kim White, the film's protagonist.
- Viktoria Vinyarska as Izzy Davis, Kim's best friend.
- Eric Wiegand as Ian, Kim's boyfriend.
- Scott Gremillion as Ronan, Kim and Izzy's landlord.
- Rick LaCour as Milton Briggs, a former janitor.
- Quinn Nehr as Tony, Izzy's date at a local bar.
- Sam Coleman as Steve, Tony's friend.
- Timothy McKinney as Dr. Phillips, Kim's college professor.
- Patrick and Susan Kirton as Samuel and Ann White, Kim's parents.
- Terry J. Nelson as Bob, a building contractor.
- Jeroen Frank Kales as Chad, Bob's construction assistant.
- Cameron Inman as Lena, Chad's girlfriend.
- Yuji Ayabe as a delivery man.
- Bria Fleming as Sandy, a television casting director's assistant and Izzy's date at a local bar.

== Production ==
Development and production of Room 203 took place in 2020, with the film shooting in Shreveport, Louisiana, during fall 2020 under COVID-19 safety protocols. The film was financed by Akatsuki Entertainment, an affiliate and predecessor company of AMMO Entertainment and Ammo Inc. Production of the film took 19 days, and filming of the main apartment location took place at The Standard Downtown Lofts, a National Register of Historic Places listed building in Shreveport. Prior to the start of production, members of the film crew discovered human remains in the building, and actress Francesca Xuereb subsequently described experiencing paranormal phenomena during the production. AMMO Entertainment and Ammo Inc. subsequently completed the post-production in early 2021. In June 2021, Voltage Pictures acquired worldwide sales rights for the film, citing the robust market for J-horror-derived projects among international buyers; Voltage subsequently represented the film to buyers at the July 2021 Cannes Film Market.

== Release ==
In October 2021, Vertical Entertainment acquired distribution rights for a limited theatrical, home-video, and video on demand release for the United States. The film was released theatrically and on-demand on April 15, 2022, with the home-video release following on June 21, 2022. In July 2022, Room 203 launched on Hulu, where it debuted in sixth place on Hulu's viewership rankings for the week.

Internationally, Room 203 received theatrical releases in select territories. In Russia, the film opened in the top 10 at the box office, earning $83,048 in its opening weekend. In Lithuania, the film opened in third place with an opening weekend gross of $14,563, and remained in the top 10 for the following month. In Poland, the film opened in fifth place, earning $53,954 in its first week. In Colombia, the film opened in seventh place with opening weekend earnings of $14,818. The film also received theatrical releases in the United Arab Emirates, Saudi Arabia, Egypt, Jordan, Latvia, Malaysia, and Bangladesh. In total, the film grossed $385,236 in worldwide theatrical revenue.

The film also received home-video releases in select international territories, including Germany and The Netherlands.

== Reception ==
On Rotten Tomatoes, the film has an approval rating of 70% based on reviews from 10 critics, with an average rating of 5.30/10.

Writing for Film Threat, Alan Ng praised Room 203 as doing "an excellent job of paying homage to Asian horror" and called the film "just right for avid fans of indie horror flicks." Steve Hutchinson of Tales of Terror highlighted the lead performances of Xuereb and Vinyarska, while describing the film as "a drama sprinkled with horror... a sad and melancholic story, and when it’s scary, it’s terrifying." Nathaniel Muir of AIPT Comics noted "the most prevalent theme is one of friendship... there is a genuineness not often seen in haunted house movies" and said Xuereb and Vinyarska's acting "carries the film." Writing for Assignment X, Abbie Bernstein heralded the "excellent lead performances by Francesca Xuereb and Viktoria Vinyarska," noting "Xuereb has warmth and sincerity, and Vinyarska navigates Izzy’s various moods with skill." Keri O'Shea of Warped Perspective identified Room 203 as being "more interested in relationship-building than generic scares" and summarized the film as "a well-made, often thoughtful, muted take on the [horror] genre." Keith Garlington of Keith at the Movies found the film "more of a mystery movie than straight-up horror" and welcomed its "patient tension-building" and psychological scares as "a gutsy creative choice." In a negative review, Owen Gleiberman of Variety critiqued the film as spending too much time focusing on the real world and lacking sufficient scares.
