= Bodycam (film) =

2025 film directed by Brandon Christensen

- Promotional release poster
- Directed by: Brandon Christensen
- Written by: Brandon Christensen; Ryan Christensen
- Produced by: Chris Ball; Brandon Christensen; Kurtis David Harder
- Starring: Jaime M. Callica; Sean Rogerson; Catherine Lough Haggquist
- Cinematography: Clayton Moore
- Edited by: Brandon Christensen; Rob Grant; Eoin Martin
- Production company: Superchill
- Distributed by: Shudder
- Release dates: August 8, 2025 (Popcorn Frights Festival); March 13, 2026 (Canada)
- Running time: 75 minutes
- Country: Canada
- Language: English
- Box office: $124,154

Bodycam is a 2025 Canadian found footage supernatural horror film directed by Brandon Christensen, starring Jaime M. Callica, Sean Rogerson, and Catherine Lough Haggquist. The film is presented from the POV of police body cameras.

== Premise ==
Police officers Jackson and Bryce are called to a rundown house over a domestic disturbance, leading them into frightening discoveries.

== Cast ==
- Jaime M. Callica as Officer Jerome Jackson
- Sean Rogerson as Officer Bryce Anderson
- Catherine Lough Haggquist as Ally Jackson
- Angel Prater as Esposito
- Keegan Connor Tracy as The Mother
- Chris Casson as The Father
- Elizabeth Longshaw as Michelle
- Colette Nwachi as Neisha Jackson

== Release ==
Bodycam was released in the United States on August 7, 2025 as part of the Popcorn Frights Festival.

It was released in Brazilian cinemas under the title "POV: Presença Oculta" on March 12, 2026, before being released in Canada the next day.the next day.

=== Critical reception ===
On the review aggregator website Rotten Tomatoes, 88% of 32 critics' reviews are positive. The website's consensus reads: "With smart, low budget ingenuity and visceral atmosphere, Bodycam delivers a brisk and often gripping found footage experience."

Kristy Puchko of Mashable gave the film a positive review, calling it a "gnarly romp" and "a wickedly smart horror film." Catherine Bray of The Guardian gave the film 3 stars out of 5, praising its "energy" and "spookiness." Simon Abrams, writing for RogerEbert.com, gave the film 2.5 stars out of 4, commenting that "while this gross and dynamic haunted chase movie coasts on a blast of carnival ride energy, it also crashes head-long into a goofy anticlimax."
