= Vindicta (film) =

2023 horror slasher film

- Theatrical release poster
- Directed by: Sean McNamara
- Screenplay by: Ian Neligh
- Story by: Steven Paul
- Produced by: Steven Paul
- Starring: Elena Kampouris; Jeremy Piven; Sean Astin
- Cinematography: Ryan Petey
- Edited by: Tony Dean Smith
- Music by: Matthew Rogers
- Production company: SP Media Group
- Distributed by: Paramount Global Content Distribution; Republic Pictures
- Release date: October 6, 2023
- Running time: 87 minutes
- Country: United States
- Language: English

Vindicta is a 2023 American slasher film from the screenplay of Ian Neligh directed by Sean McNamara. It stars Elena Kampouris, Jeremy Piven and Sean Astin. The film centers on a rookie paramedic whose first days in a city plagued by riots becomes all the more terrifying when a sadistic serial killer begins targeting a select group of people, leading her to learn of a dark secret with connections to her own family.

== Plot ==
Lou (Elena Kampouris), is a newly recruited paramedic eager to prove herself on her first day. Her father, Patrick (Jeremy Piven), a retired police officer, supports her endeavors, while her superior, Rick (Sean Astin), remains skeptical of her capabilities. Lou is partnered with Jason (Jaime M. Callica), a seasoned paramedic, to navigate the chaos engulfing the city.

Amidst the turmoil, a masked serial killer emerges, donning a visage resembling Michelangelo's David. The killer leaves behind victims in grotesque states, accompanied by cryptic Latin phrases scrawled in blood. Lou's proficiency in Latin becomes instrumental in deciphering these messages, leading her to collaborate with Detective Stan Russo (Travis Nelson) in the investigation.

As the body count rises, Lou begins to suspect a personal connection to the killer. Her suspicions are confirmed when she discovers that the killer, David (Daniel Cudmore), has been stalking her and has ties to a tragic event from her childhood. Years prior, a fire deliberately set by corrupt officers, including her father, claimed the lives of David's wife and son. David, presumed dead, survived with severe disfigurements, overhearing Patrick's plan to frame David for his family's murder, and has since been seeking vengeance against those responsible.

David captures Lou, forcing her to confront the sins of her father. Patrick arrives in an attempt to save his daughter but is ultimately killed by David. Lou manages to escape, engaging in a deadly game of cat and mouse with David. Utilizing her resourcefulness, she traps him in a room and sets it on fire. Despite the inferno, David proves resilient, leading to a final struggle where Lou fatally stabs him, ensuring her survival.

In the aftermath, authorities place David's charred body into a body bag. However, his eyes are open.

== Cast ==
- Elena Kampouris as Lou
- Jeremy Piven as Patrick O'Connor
- Sean Astin as Rick
- Travis Nelson as Detective Stan Russo
- Jaime Callica as Jason Clark
- Daniel Cudmore as David
- Bradley Stryker as Vinny
- Karolina Cubitt as Ramona
- Michasha Armstrong as Hale
- Olivia Summers as Lana
- Adam Pateman as Camera Man
- Todd Masters as Officer Thomas
- Timothy Lambert as Homeless Man
- Robin Atkin Downes as David (voice)
- Adam Gillese as Ricks Son

== Production ==
September 7, 2023, the cast and crew was announced and revealed that Ian Neligh wrote the screenplay, Steven Paul working the story and one of the producer and Scott Karol and Charles Cooper served as executive producers.

Kampouris is repped by Impression Entertainment and Schreck Rose Dapello Adams Berlin & Dunham. Astin is repped by Stewart Talent, Luber Roklin Entertainment, and Brecheen Feldman Breimer Silver Thompson. Piven is repped by APA, Wonder Street, and Felker Toczek Suddleson Abramson McGinnis Ryan.

== Release ==
The film was acquired by Republic Pictures on August 17, 2023. The Republic Pictures deal was negotiated by Scott Karol, president of SPMG. The film was released on October 6, 2023.

== Reception ==
On the review aggregator website Rotten Tomatoes, 14% of 7 critics' reviews are positive, with an average rating of 3.20/10.

Emily Black of Cinema Crazed gave the film a rating of 3.5 over 5 a wrote: Vindicta is a horror film for the general public, but it also has some great bits for hard core horror fans, making this a fun ride for most viewers. The practical effects are strong, the performances work (in most cases), and the film is an easy watch. It has some gruesome sequences and is definitely something that is right for the season. It's not perfect, but when watched with the angle of it being a slasher film, it becomes a lot of fun.

Michael Gingold from Rue Morgue gave the film a negative review and he said, "The more the movie tries to explain its plot, the more ridiculous it becomes, climaxing with a protracted chase-and-fight of the type we’ve seen dozens (hundreds?) of times before."
