= John Poliquin =

Canadian music video, commercial and film director (born 1986)

- Born: August 24, 1986 (age 40); North Vancouver, British Columbia
- Occupation: Film director
- Years active: 2007–present
- Notable work: Grave Encounters 2
- Awards: Juno Awards Nominations MuchMusic Video Awards Creative Arts Emmys Wins

John "JP" Poliquin (born August 24, 1986) is a Canadian music video, commercial and feature film director. He has directed music videos for bands such as Hedley, Finger Eleven, Mother Mother, and Carly Rae Jepsen, and his music video work has been nominated for awards at the Juno Awards, the MuchMusic Video Awards, the East Coast Music Association Awards, the PEI Music Awards, and the Leo Awards. His video for Hedley "Anything" won Video of the Year, Pop Video of the Year and Your Fave Video at the 2014 MuchMusic Video Awards.

His 2008 short film "Inside Charlie" has been nominated for a number of awards. In 2012, John Poliquin directed the found-footage horror film Grave Encounters 2, his first feature film as director. He has also directed videos for The Next Star, a series aired on the youth-oriented Canadian television network YTV. Poliquin has also appeared on MuchMusic's television program New.Music.Live as an industry expert. Most recently, Poliquin co-wrote the upcoming horror film Room 203.

== Early life, education ==
John "JP" Poliquin was born on August 24, 1986, in North Vancouver, British Columbia. In his youth he would use his father's video camera to shoot "crazy short films and skateboard videos." As a high school student he attended Handsworth Secondary School in Vancouver, and during the summers would work on local film sets. Around 2005 this included working as a production assistant on projects such as Merlin's Apprentice, John Tucker Must Die, and Snakes on a Plane, and by 2006 he was also working on sets such as Her Fatal Flaw as a camera trainee. In 2009 he served as a grip in Santa Buddies and a location production assistant for the TV movie Web of Desire. Stated Poliquin, "I worked in tons of different departments (assistant directing, camera, grip, props, locations, etc.) and realized that what I really wanted to do was direct. Even if it was low budget I knew I'd enjoy that role more." He graduated with a BFA in New Media and Film from the University of Lethbridge in Alberta.

== Film career ==
=== Early years ===
Among Poliquin's first directorial projects was the short film "Inside Charlie," released in 2007. The film, which he co-wrote, followed the story of a photographer seeking to take a picture to save his career. At the 2008 Calgary International Film Festival it was nominated for both "Best New Film" and "Audience Favorite."

=== Music videos ===
By 2010 Poliquin was active in directing music videos for artists, many signed to major labels in Canada. Among the bands he has worked with are Hey Ocean!, Tim Chaisson, Hedley, Finger Eleven, My Darkest Days, Mother Mother, Arkells, Theory of a Deadman, The Trews, Small Sins, The New Cities, Paper Lions, illScarlett, The Latency, Brock Zanrosso, Victoria Duffield, State of Shock, and Gary Beals. Poliquin was nominated for his first major music video award in 2010, when "A Song About California" by Hey Ocean! was nominated for "Best New Video" at the Leo Awards. His music video work has since been nominated for awards at the Juno Awards, the MuchMusic Video Awards, the East Coast Music Association Awards, and the PEI Music Awards.

In 2010, Tim Chaisson's band filmed their first music video for "Broken Hearted Beat" in Toronto with Poliquin. The video was released in May 2010 on CMT and also made it to the #1 spot on Much More Music’s Top 10. Immediately following the video’s release, its single was released and made it to #1 on the East Coast Countdown. The music video for "Slippin’ Away", also directed by Poliquin, was released in October 2010. It reached #8 on the Much More Music Top 20 Countdown. Also in 2010, the band Paper Lions had the Poliquin-directed video for their single "Lost the War" nominated for a 2010 CBC Radio 3 Bucky Award.

John JP Poliquin has appeared on-air several times on MuchMusic's television program New.Music.Live, sitting on an expert panel to discuss industry music videos and adding entries to their official blog. In January 2012, his music video for Light Organ Records artist Adaline "The Noise" premiered exclusively with Andy Warhol's Interview Magazine.

In 2015, Poliquin directed Hyphen Hyphen's Just Need Your Love in Lanzarote.

=== Film and television ===
From 2010 to 2012 he directed segments for The Next Star, a series aired on the youth-oriented Canadian television network YTV.

In 2012, Poliquin directed the found-footage horror film Grave Encounters 2, the sequel to the 2011 cult hit Grave Encounters, which is his first film as director. Written and produced by the Canadian filmmaker duo The Vicious Brothers, the film follows a film student investigating the found footage from the sequel. The film received mixed reviews, but like its predecessor, many were largely positive, particularly concerning Poliquin's directorship. According to Dread Central, "if you look at just the first two acts, it is one of the most smartly written... and directed movies this reviewer has seen all year. At the helm is John Poliquin, and he takes the events of the first film and builds upon them in the most clever of ways. Poliquin's direction is beyond spot on, and he and the Vicious Brothers collectively managed to deliver an almost perfect sequel to Grave Encounters."

In 2020, Poliquin co-wrote the horror film Room 203, based on the novel of the same name by Japanese writer Nanami Kamon. The film's worldwide sales rights were subsequently acquired by Voltage Pictures, with the domestic distribution rights acquired by Vertical Entertainment.

== Style and themes ==
About his influences, Poliquin has stated his favorite directors include David Fincher, Michel Gondry, Jonas Akerlund, and Dougal Wilson, and that "For horror films, Hitchcock and Kubrick are my idols."

== Personal life ==
He currently resides in Los Angeles.

== Filmography ==
=== Films ===
Feature and short films involving John Poliquin
Year	Film	Studio	Role
2007	Inside Charlie		Director, co-writer
2009	Frog		Producer
2012	Grave Encounters 2	Tribeca Film Festival	Director, background actor
2013	Yes, I Did	M. Blaustein	Director
2013	Wilhelminia Fashion Film Collection	Wilhelminia Models	Director of 30 short films
2014	Bitten		Director, co-writer, editor
2021	Spiral	Digital Interference	Co-writer, producer
2021	Room 203	Ammo Entertainment	Co-writer
2025	Selfie	ALTER	Director, co-writer, producer

=== Television ===
Television directed by John Poliquin
Year	Film	Studio	Role
2010-2012	The Next Star Top 6	YTV	Director of "Oh Oh Santa" segment
2015	Chilling Visions: 5 Senses of Fear	NBC Chiller	Director, co-writer, editor

=== Music videos ===
Music videos directed by John Poliquin
Yr	Title	Album/artist	Production company	Role
2010	"A Song About California"	Hey Ocean!		Director
2010	"Milkshakes and Razorblades"	illScarlett (ft. Kardinal Offishall)	Sony Music	Director, post-production
2010	"Broken Hearted Beat"	Tim Chaisson		Director
2010	"Slippin' Away"	Tim Chaisson		Director
2010	"Living in a Dream"	Finger Eleven		Director
2011	"Lost the War"	Paper Lions		Director
2011	"The Stand"	Mother Mother		Director
2011	"Broken Hearted Beat"	Tim Chaisson		Director
2012	"The Noise"	Adaline	Light Organ	Director
2012	"Too Cold"	Current Swell	Nettwerk Records	Director
2012	"Easy To Love"	Theory Of A Deadman	Roadrunner	Director
2012	"On The Radio"	Rikers	Warner Music	Director
2012	"Colour Blind"	Small Town Pistols	Warner Music	Director
2012	"Dedicated To You"	Johnny Reid	Universal Canada	Director
2012	"Beautiful"	Jessica Lee	604 Records	Director
2012	"Curiosity"	Carly Rae Jepsen	Interscope	2nd Unit Director
2012	"Colour Blind"	Small Town Pistols		Director
2012	"Michigan Left"	Arkells	Universal Canada	Director
2012	"Heatwave"	The New Cities		Director
2013	"I Wake Up Every Day"	Thomas D'Arcy	Maple Music	Director, editor
2014	"Anything"	Hedley		Director
2014	"Get Out the Way"	Mother Mother	Island, Universal Canada	Director
2015	"Just Need Your Love"	Hyphen Hyphen	Parlophone	Director, editor

== Awards and nominations ==
Year	Award	Category	Film/music video/subject	Result
2008	Calgary International; Film Festival	Best Short Film	Inside Charlie	Nominated
2008	Calgary International; Film Festival	Audience Favorite	Inside Charlie	Nominated
2010	Leo Awards	Best Music Video	"A Song About California" by Hey Ocean!	Nominated
2010	MuchMusic Video Awards	Best Post Production	"Milkshakes and Razorblades" by IllScarlett	Nominated
2011	East Coast Music Awards	Fan's Choice Video	"Lost the War" by Paper Lions "Broken Hearted Beat" by Tim Chaisson	Nominated
2012	East Coast Music Awards	Fan's Choice Video	"Slippin' Away" by Tim Chaisson	Nominated
2012	PEI Music Awards	Best Video	"Slippin' Away" by Tim Chaisson	Nominated
2012	Juno Awards	Video of the Year	"The Stand" by Mother Mother	Nominated
2012	MuchMusic Video Awards	Best Rock Video	"Michigan Left" by Arkells	Nominated
2012	MuchMusic Video Awards	Best Post Production	"Heatwave" by The New Cities	Nominated
2013	Elle Canada Fashion Film Awards	Best Fashion Film	Norman Ambrose Campaign	Nominated
2014	Much Music Video Awards	Director of the Year	Poliquin	Nominated
2014	Much Music Video Awards	Video of the Year	"Anything" by Hedley	Won
2014	Much Music Video Awards	Pop Video of the Year	"Anything" by Hedley	Won
2014	Much Music Video Awards	You Fave Video of the Year	"Anything" by Hedley	Won
2014	Much Music Video Awards	MuchMusic Video of the Year	"More Than Friends" by Victoria Duffield	Nominated
2014	Juno Awards	Video of the Year	"Anything" by Hedley	Nominated
2015	Much Music Video Awards	Best Post Production	"Rule the World" by Walk Off the Earth	Nominated
2015	The One Club / One Show 2015	One To Watch Award 2015	Directing Portfolio / Body of Work	Won
2016	2016 iHeartRadio MMVAs	Best EDM Video	"Quit This City" by Grandtheft ft. Lowell	Won

== See also ==
- Grave Encounters 2
