= Francesca Xuereb =

American actress

- Born: August 28, 1998 (age 28); Detroit, Michigan, U.S.
- Occupation: Actress
- Years active: 2020–present

Francesca Xuereb (born August 28, 1998 in Detroit) is an American actress best known for playing Kim White in the horror film Room 203 and Cheyenne in the drama series Landman.

== Early life ==
She received a bachelor's degree from Loyola Marymount University in Los Angeles.

== Career ==
Early in her career, she had minor appearances in shows such as Pam & Tommy, Young Sheldon and SEAL Team. She played the recurring role of Quinn in the teen comedy drama series The Sex Lives of College Girls.. In 2024 she wrote and starred in her first short film called Starved which got reviews and was awarded the best experimental short at the Progeny Short Film Festival. Her biggest role so far has been playing Cheyenne, the physical therapist of Sam Elliot in the drama series Landman.. She is currently shooting the horror film Sigil in which she will star alongside Sierra McCormick and Cailyn Rice.

== Personal life ==
When Xuereb is not acting, she works as a waitress at Akasha, a restaurant in Culver City. In January 2023, she initially quit her job as a waitress to concentrate on her acting career. However, due to strikes by SAG-AFTRA later that year, she returned to the restaurant.

== Filmography ==
=== Film ===
Year	Title	Role	Notes
2020	Gracie Turns 15	Cameron	Short
2020	Forever & Always	Kayla	Short
2021	Be Leaving	Fair Skinned Woman	Short
2022	Dangerous Cheaters	Kayla Parker	
2022	Room 203	Kim White	
2022	Murmur	Roxy	
2024	Starved	Young Woman	
2026	Music on the Bones at the Whisky	Valerie	
2026	Quiet	Leah	Short
2026	Sigil		

=== Television ===
Year	Title	Role	Notes
2021	SEAL Team	Alana 2001	Episode; "Nine Ten"
2021	Swipe Night: Killer Weekend	Phoebe	3 episodes
2022	Pam & Tommy	Brigitte	Episode; "Drilling and Pounding"
2022	Young Sheldon	Shannon Dixon	Episode; "Future Worf and the Margarita of the South Pacific"
2021-22	The Sex Lives of College Girls	Quinn	2 episodes
2026	Landman	Cheyenne	3 episodes
2024-26	Ted	Erin	4 episodes
