= Riverview Hospital (Coquitlam) =

Former mental health facility in British Columbia, Canada

Riverview Mental Health
- BC Mental Health & Addiction Services
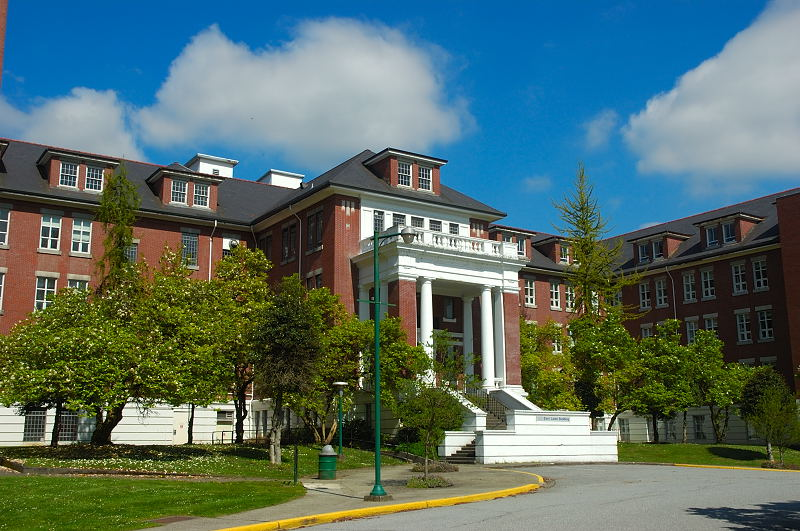
- East Lawn Building, 2009

Geography
- Location: 2601 Lougheed Hwy, Coquitlam, BC V3C 4J2, British Columbia, Canada
- Coordinates: 49.246544°N 122.805602°W

Organization
- Care system: Medicare
- Type: Specialist

Services
- Emergency department: No
- Beds: Over 800
- Specialty: Psychiatric

History
- Founded: April 1, 1913
- Closed: July 2012

Links
- Lists: Hospitals in Canada

Riverview Hospital was a Canadian mental health facility located in Coquitlam, British Columbia. It operated under the governance of BC Mental Health & Addiction Services until it closed, in July 2012. In December 2015, the provincial government announced plans to replace the obsolete buildings with new mental health facilities. On October 12, 2021, the new Red Fish Healing Centre for Mental Health and Addiction opened on the site.

== History ==
=== Early institutions and site acquisition ===
In 1904, the British Columbia provincial government purchased 1,000 acres (400 ha) of then-rural Coquitlam, including the adjacent Colony Farm. This was for the purpose of constructing a new mental hospital due to overcrowding at the hospitals in Victoria and New Westminster.

Construction of the new hospital began in 1905, with the assistance of 25 patients of the Provincial Hospital for the Insane in New Westminster. The patients cleared the land and constructed farm buildings along with temporary shelters to reside in.

In 1911, John Davidson, British Columbia's first Provincial Botanist, established an arboretum, a nursery, and a botanical garden on the hospital lands. He often used the assistance of patients, due to the contemporary belief in the therapeutic value of outdoor work.

=== Opening and expansion ===
In 1913, the first building, West Lawn (originally the Male Chronic Wing), was opened to treat male patients. There were 453 patients living onsite in 1913. The patients, both children and adults, were individuals with a mental illness or with a developmental disability. Treatments included medication, rest, and hydrotherapy. The building was constructed to hold 480 patients, but housed 919 by the end of the year.

The hospital was established under the direction of the Provincial Secretary and Minister of Education Henry Esson Young and was named Essondale Hospital in his honour.

By this time, Colony Farm was producing over 700 tons of crops and 20,000 gallons of milk annually, largely through patient labour. The produce was used to feed staff and patients.

In 1924, the Acute Psychopathic Unit (later Centre Lawn) opened. In 1930, the 675-bed Female Chronic Unit (later East Lawn) opened due to overcrowding at the New Westminster mental hospital. In 1934, the Veteran's Unit was inaugurated. After the Second World War, veteran patients were transferred to a building on Colony Farm. The Veteran's Unit grew and became the Crease Clinic of Psychological Medicine in 1949. This marked the separation from Essondale Hospital, as they operated under different health legislation. The hospital was renamed the Provincial Mental Hospital, Essondale, in 1950. In 1955, the Tuberculosis Unit (later North Lawn) opened, to stop the spread of tuberculosis within the facility.

Through the 1930s to 1950s, the hospital struggled with staff shortages and overcrowding.

=== Peak and administrative changes ===
At its peak, the hospital had 4,725 patients. In 1959, the charge of mental health services shifted from the provincial secretary to the newly formed Department of Health Services. The transfer was followed by a transition from custodial care to the more active psychiatric care of patients. In 1967, Davidson resigned as deputy minister and was replaced by F.G. Tucker, a resident physician of Essondale (Riverview) from 1953 who, in 1959, became the clinical director of the Crease Clinic.

In 1965, the Crease Clinic and Essondale Provincial Mental Hospital merged.

=== Decline and closure ===
By the mid 1950s, the introduction of anti-psychotic drugs resulted in many patients returning to the community. Some say that the reason for this decrease was initially due to the introduction of anti-psychotic medications and the development of psychiatric units in acute-care hospitals as well as a move toward outpatient care. As early as 1967, a decision had been made to downsize Riverview Hospital. The determination was first brought up officially on paper three years after the publication of the Mental Health Act of 1964, which intended to have mental health care be as readily available to the population as that of physical health. The two acts worked in conjunction so that by 1970, there were seventeen mental health centres in British Columbia, twelve of which had opened within the previous four years.

In 1969, the provincial government appointed a committee to review the role of the Mental Health Branch of social services in British Columbia. The committee decided to further downsize Riverview in a stated plan to implement other community care centres. As further closures were being planned, legislation was also passed in 1969 that deemed Riverview an "open hospital" allowing private practitioners to send their patients to Riverview. A shift away from directors trained in psychiatry to administrative ones was marked. As services and beds at Riverview continuously decreased, while opening access to it through private practice, another official plan to entirely close Riverview Hospital was written in 1987: A Draft Plan to Replace Riverview Hospital.

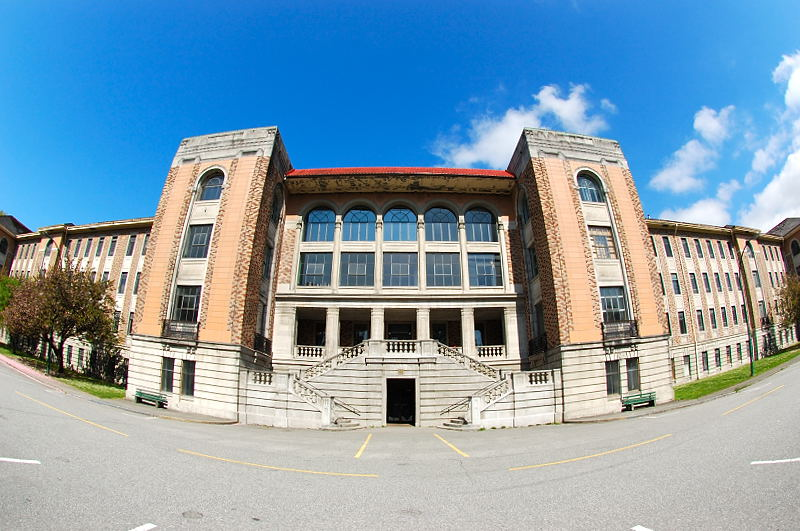
Crease Clinic, 2009

Regional clinics began drawing patients from Riverview, and both advances in treatment and eventual cutbacks in funding resulted in fewer people receiving mental health care province-wide.

In 1984, West Lawn closed, and farming operations at Colony Farm were discontinued. In 1984, the provincial government sold 57 hectares (141 acres) of Riverview lands to Molnar Developments. Shortly afterward, this land was subdivided and became Riverview Heights, with about 250 single-family homes. In 1985, an acute geriatric unit was opened at Riverview Hospital.

In 1988, management of the hospital was officially transferred from the directors to a board of provincially appointed trustees. The shift was an anticipated one, as the Report of the Mental Health Planning Survey of 1979 states: "What began as the sensible idea of using non-medical, trained administrators for administrative tasks, has subtly become the use of untrained non-medical administrators, and a simultaneous denial of the psychiatrist's role in clinical leadership." The shift had been happening from the early 1960s and has been argued to be one of the reasons for the 1969 committee's decision to downsize Riverview and decrease funding. The board, as far less experienced in psychiatry than the original managers, who held doctorates and who were trained psychiatrists, were again replaced in 1992 by another board without trustees that was said to give a broader representation of concerns, including those of consumers patients, businesses, and union and community agencies.

By 1990, the decision had officially been made to reduce Riverview to a 358-bed facility, with the presumed intention of opening regional-care facilities throughout the province as stated in the Mental Health Initiative.

In 1992, the report Listening: A Review of Riverview Hospital was published as an attempt to resolve the complaints of patients and their family members that had gone ignored for years. The document "emphasizes that a full assessment of patients' decision-making abilities and personal support network is necessary, and that a patient be notified and given an opportunity to object before an incapability certificate is completed." The new rights of patients were implemented less than a decade before the hospital was entirely shut down.

In 1992, the Crease Clinic closed. That year, the Riverview Horticultural Centre Society was formed to preserve the remnants of the botanical garden and to advocate for John Davidson's vision of psychological therapy through horticulture.

By 1994, the patient population had dwindled to 850. In 1998, a revised mental health plan included the plan to close Riverview.

In 2000, the institution faced criticism for the continued use of electroshock therapy at the hospital.

By 2002, there were 800 beds in all of Riverview. In 2004, it was stated that by 2007, 400 new beds would open in other areas of British Columbia for mental health services, but places and dates went unmentioned; neither did the report state how many beds would be removed from Riverview. In 2005, the East Lawn building closed, followed by the North Lawn building in 2007.

In 2012, Riverview Hospital closed.

=== Redevelopment ===
Other buildings on Riverview Hospital grounds continued as mental health facilities. In 2005, the city's task force on the hospital lands rejected the idea of further housing on the lands and declared that the lands and buildings should be protected and remain as a mental health facility. In 2009, Riverview Hospital was added to the Canadian Register of Historic Places.

Other mental health facilities have been constructed on the Riverview grounds, the first being Connolly Lodge, which opened on March 1, 2002; Cottonwood Lodge opened a few years later, and Cypress Lodge on April 23, 2010. Together, these three lodges have beds for 64 patients. In addition, twelve cottages are still in use as transitional housing for patients from the Forensic Hospital, and the Brookside and Hillside buildings host a 35-bed residential rehabilitation and recovery program run by Coast Mental Health for patients with concurrent disorders.

The construction of a provincially funded $101-million mental health and addiction treatment facility on the Riverview grounds, named Red Fish Healing Centre for Mental Health and Addiction, began in 2017 and was planned to be completed in 2021. The facility, opened on October 12, 2021, has an inpatient capacity of 105. The Healing Centre delivers specialized care for adults with severe and complex mental health and addiction challenges. It is believed to be the first large, standalone centre dedicated to treating the concurrent disorders of mental health and addictions.

== Units before closure ==
=== Industrial Therapy Building ===
The Industrial Therapy Building was implemented in 1963, with a total cost of $505,000. Patients were assigned for instruction and training in a selected shop, which included cabinet, upholstery, furniture finishing, metal, printing, electronics, machine, mattresses, tailor, and shoemaking. It was said that the program was of use to the patients, as they would need vocations when they were to resume life in the community. The shops were supposed to give them skills to work once discharged from the hospital.

=== Geriatric Psychiatric Division ===
The Geriatric Psychiatry Division of Riverview Hospital was opened in 1985. A 26-bed acute (temporary) admissions unit was opened. The division was intended to be the first stage of a larger implementation of geriatric services in psychiatry across British Columbia. The program focused on social interaction and fast movement into the community and social situations.

== Film industry ==
The vacant structures that used to form the hospital are now often used as filming locations. Shows and films such as Watchmen, Supernatural, The X Files, Arrow, Elf, Smallville, Happy Gilmore, Prison Break, Riverdale, Falling Skies, Motherland: Fort Salem, The Butterfly Effect, Final Destination 2, and Grave Encounters have made use of the Riverview property to form sets depicting a variety of scenes. A significant portion of Deadpool 2, including the initial and final battle sequences, was filmed at Centre Lawn.

== Publications ==
=== Riverview Reminisces ===
Riverview Reminisces is a collection of stories and anecdotes from the staff of Riverview Hospital. The stories span the first years of Riverview's existence to its last years, prior to closure. It was published in 1992.

=== Mental Health Consultation Report: A Draft Plan to Replace Riverview Hospital ===
A Draft Plan to Replace Riverview Hospital is a 1987 report that demonstrates the reasoning for closing Riverview Hospital, the intended community implementations of psychiatric services, and the necessary transitional procedures (the majority of which were never seen).

The report states: "Implementation will involve redeveloping and reallocating existing resources applied at Riverview Hospital" (21). Riverview was to be reduced to a 550-medium/long-term patient capacity from its then-1,306, with the resources being reallocated "elsewhere in the community" (ibid).

The process was said to constitute the following: 218 staff FTEs for case management/outpatient treatment duties, resulting in 4,360 additional units of care being available to the mental health system; 1,090 additional patient places for community support lrograms (i.e., social/recreational and life skills/vocational); 310 additional residential care beds for mental health care, divided between intermediate and special adult residential treatment facilities; 60 psychiatric acute care beds to be added to the general hospital system (ibid).

Implementation was suggested to be a two-stage process. The first stage was to include the development of community residential, day program, and case management/outpatient treatment resources around the province to reduce Riverview patient population to 550 over three years. Additional beds in general hospitals and testing of medium/long-term inpatient units in urban areas were suggested to fall under the first stage. Further implementation of the medium/long-term care units was to take place following the three years so as to conjoin with the anticipated closure of Riverview five years from that date (ibid).

An orderly transitional period was deemed necessary for patients to be relocated to appropriate community settings with 'sufficient mental health staff and programs to monitor, follow-up, and promote their readjustment outside the institution" (22).

The report emphasizes that implementation of the plan should be gradual and orderly, with continuous monitoring to assure the system meets the needs of the mentally ill. It also repeats that there should be careful assessment and supervision of patients being transferred from Riverview Hospital—that any transfers should be based on clinical assessment and that proper discussion with family members must take place (ibid).

Home and family care were strongly recommended in the report for geriatric patients.

In the sections titled "Summary of Recommendations", the first two recommendations enforce the role of the families to take care of patients. The third emphasizes the role of volunteer programs to help the mentally ill. The primary-care physician (GP) was also suggested to become the main person to treat mental illness. Suggestion 14 states that general community services should play an important role in aiding those with mental illness. Recommendation 25 also enforces the role of general practitioners and community psychiatrists (30).

As can be seen by the stated recommendations, extra finances were hoped to be avoided in the change. As well, the overall amount of finances given by the provincial government to psychiatric care was expected to decrease, which is apparent in the report. Be that as it may, recommendations still distinctly state that "The current level of financial resources at Riverview Hospital should be available for treatment, rehabilitation, and support of the mentally ill people transferred to community-based facilities and programs" (22).

Despite financial cuts, many of the recommendations enforce sufficient beds for the acutely mentally ill, proper assessment and supervision, and sufficient education for the new carers to be offered as psychiatric care changes. Even more importantly, recommendations 63 and 64 state that all programs must be in place prior to any reductions or adjustments to Riverview, and that bridge funding between the psychiatric hospital and community programs must be available (32). The report, although subtly recommending a decrease in governmental financial aid for psychiatric services, repeatedly states that sufficient funding and proper care in transfers, including previously implemented community resources and supervision by Riverview before and after discharge, are crucial.

=== BC Housing: A Vision for Renewing Riverview ===
In 2015, BC Housing published "A Vision for Renewing Riverview", an initiative for developing the Riverview lands into a provincially administered municipality including housing for the mentally ill and for Indigenous housing. As of 2019, the BC government has not acted upon this initiative.

== Impact of closure ==
The 1990 Mental Health Initiative stated that the provincial government would invest $26 million in additional funding over ten years. Only the first payment was made on schedule; by 1992, the second payment was eighteen months overdue.

In 1992, about 8,000 of the yearly emergency admissions to Vancouver's mental health facilities were people with both drug addictions and mental illnesses. That year, Greater Vancouver Mental Health Services employed 115 full-time workers to serve more than 4,000 patients. Ex-patients of Riverview were often left without help or financial aid, which caused them to flock toward the Downtown Eastside of Vancouver.

Joseph Noone, the clinical director psychiatrist-in-chief at Riverview, stated that 1,000 patients were admitted to and discharged from the hospital annually.

By 2002, Riverview had 800 beds. Stakeholders projected that 920 specialized mental health beds would be located in smaller hospitals throughout British Columbia, but neither dates, places, nor names were given. No mention of sites opening in the city of Vancouver were mentioned, either.

In 2003, three new mental health facilities had opened, in Prince George, Kamloops, and Victoria, and these were immediately filled with former Riverview patients.

At the 2004 stakeholders' meeting, it was stated that there were 84 new beds in mental health housing facilities in British Columbia. From 2003 to 2004, four beds had been officially added. At the same meeting, it was stated that by 2007, over 400 newly developed mental health beds were to open in the Vancouver Coastal and Fraser Health Authorities, a 520-bed decrease from what was stated the previous year. At the same meeting, PHSA Mental Health Services President Leslie Arnold said, "A comprehensive transition care plan, including input from family members, is developed from each RVH patient prior to transfer'.

In 2013, then-mayor of Maple Ridge stated that he was concerned with the number of people with mental illness who were living on the street in the Lower Mainland. His council pushed to re-open Riverview Hospital to help solve the problem.

On September 20, 2013, the BC government rejected the recommendation of the Union of BC Mayors to re-instate Riverview Hospital. The reason the premier gave was that re-institutionalization is not the solution to homelessness or drug addiction. Instead, there is "a new set of problems we need to deal with...Gaps in the community health care system are what need to be addressed".

The building was altered for use in the 2014 film Godzilla and was still in modern hospital conditions at the time. Conservationists had hopes to save it so that it could be reopened, but demolition went ahead.

Demolition of the Valleyview building, one of the last buildings onsite to close, began in 2016.
