= Juan Riedinger =

Canadian actor

- Born: 27 February 1981 (age 44); Banff, Alberta, Canada
- Education: University of Calgary
- Occupation: Actor
- Years active: 2005–present
- Spouse: Agam Darshi
- Children: 2

Juan Riedinger is a Canadian actor. He is known for portraying Rufus in the CBC television series The Romeo Section (2015–2016), and Carlos Lehder in the Netflix series Narcos (2015–2017). His other TV roles include Dodger in The CW series Riverdale (2017–2023), Joe Dupree in the TNT series Claws (2017–2022) and Teo in the TNT series Good Behavior (2016–2017). He is the recipient of three Leo Awards.

== Early life ==
Riedinger was born in Banff, Alberta, to a Peruvian mother and a German father. He attended the University of Calgary. As of December 2017, he splits his time between Los Angeles and Vancouver.

== Personal life ==
He is married to Agam Darshi and they have twin sons.

== Filmography ==
=== Film ===
Year	Title	Role	Notes
2006	Balloon and the Beast	Skater Yellow	Short film
2006	The Entrance	Drug Addict #1	
2006	Black Christmas	Morgue Attendant	
2007	Aliens vs. Predator: Requiem	Scotty	
2008	Ace of Hearts	Church Thief	
2008	Shred	K-Dog	
2008	The Day the Earth Stood Still	William Kwa	
2009	Revenge of the Boarding School Dropouts	K-Dog	
2009	Held Hostage	Bones	
2009	Jennifer's Body	Dirk	
2009	Hardwired	Punk Blue	
2010	2 Frogs in the West	Tobey	
2011	Collision Earth	Carjacker	
2011	Grave Encounters	Matt White	
2011	Marilyn	Motel Clerk	
2012	Hannah's Law	Gambler	
2015	Excess Flesh	Sebastian	
2015	Broken Horses	Eric	
2015	Vendetta	Booker	
2016	It Stains the Sands Red	Smalls	
2017	Drawing Home	Peter Whyte	
2022	Riceboy Sleeps	Doyle	
2023	She Talks to Strangers	Detective Bruce	

=== Television ===
Year	Title	Role	Notes
2006	Godiva's	Detective Brett Longoria	2 episodes
2006	Intelligence	Derek	Episode: "Pressure Drop"
2007	Blood Ties	Ian Reddick	2 episodes
2007	The L Word	Rocker Dude	Episode: "Literaly License to Kill"
2007	Zero Hour	Jay	
2007	Bionic Woman	Sean	Episode: "The Education of Jaime Sommers"
2007–2009	Smallville	Lowell Wilson; A.J.	2 episodes
2008	Psych	Delivery Man	Episode: "Lights, Camera... Homicidio"
2009	The Guard	Miles	Episode: "Out of the Woods"
2010	Supernatural	Ted	Episode: "Sam, Interrupted"
2010	Fringe	Craig Shoen	Episode: "Northwest Passage"
2011	Human Target	Billy	Episode: "Cool Hand Guerrero"
2011	Sanctuary	German Major	Episode: "Normandy"
2011–2014	The Haunting Hour: The Series	John 'Mad Dog' McCoy / Ranger Jackson / Stranger	3 episodes
2012	Continuum	Francis Hall	Episode: "Time's Up"
2013	Covert Affairs	Eduardo Vargas	Episode: "I've Been Waiting for You"
2015	Narcos	Carlos Lehder	4 episodes
2015–2016	The Romeo Section	Rufus Decker	Main role; 20 episodes
2016	Zoo	Duncan Santos	Episode: "Sex, Lies and Jellyfish"
2016	Motive	Ron Dacksell	Episode: "Natural Selection"
2017	When We Rise	Jandro	Episode: "Night IV: Part VI and VII"
2017	Lethal Weapon	Liam Taylor	Episode: "Wreck the Halls"
2017	Good Behavior	Teo	9 episodes
2019	Claws	Joe Dupree	8 episodes
2019–2021	Riverdale	Dodger Dickenson	4 episodes
2020	NCIS: Los Angeles	Navy Chief Petty Officer Thomas Argento	2 episodes
2021	Motherland: Fort Salem	Shane	4 episodes
