= Fixer Upper Mysteries =

American television film series

- Genre: Mystery film
- Written by: Kate Carlisle; Peter Hume; Teena Booth
- Directed by: Mark Jean
- Starring: Jewel Kilcher; Colin Ferguson
- Original language: English
- No. of episodes: 3

Original release
- Network: Hallmark Movies & Mysteries
- Release: January 15, 2017 – March 11, 2018

Fixer Upper Mysteries is a three-film series that airs on the Hallmark Mystery channel and is available for streaming via Hallmark+.

The films star Jewel and Colin Ferguson and were filmed in the US and Canada. They are based on the Fixer Upper Mystery novels by Kate Carlisle, and the first aired in 2017.

== Series overview ==
The series centers around a construction company owner and expert in home renovation (Jewel) and her involvement in criminal investigations with a local investigative reporter (Ferguson).

== Cast and characters ==
- Shannon Hughes (Jewel) owns a construction company and is a home renovation expert.
- Mac Sullivan (Colin Ferguson) is an investigative reporter.
- Jennifer Hennessey (Erin Karpluk) is Hughes' best friend.
- Pete Hughes (Ron Lea) is Hughes' father.

== List of films ==
No.	Title	Directed by	Written by	Original release date
1	"Framed for Murder: A Fixer Upper Mystery"	Mark Jean	Kate Carlisle, Peter Hume, Teena Booth	January 15, 2017
In the small resort town of Lighthouse Cove, everyone knows that the best man for the job is a woman. And that woman is Shannon Hughes, owner of Hughes Construction Company and an expert in Victorian home restoration and renovation. Through her renovations she will find clues to uncover the house’s secret past and in turn become an unlikely sleuth to help crack these unsolved mysteries.
2	"Concrete Evidence: A Fixer Upper Mystery"	Mark Jean	Kate Carlisle, Teena Booth	April 2, 2017
When Mac—Shannon’s new beau—first moved to Lighthouse Cove, he bought the historic lighthouse mansion that the town is named after. During renovation demolition, the bones of a teenage girl who went missing fifteen years ago were discovered. If Shannon has any chance of getting the renovation back on track, she’ll need to tackle the cold case.
3	"Deadly Deed: A Fixer Upper Mystery"	Mark Jean	Kate Carlisle, Teena Booth	March 11, 2018
Shannon Hughes has taken on a charity project renovating a grand old Victorian mansion. When a local banker is found murdered inside, Shannon must dust off the clues and cement the truth before her renovation becomes a demolition.
