= Birthright (2010 film) =

- Directed by: Naoki Hashimoto
- Written by: Naoki Hashimoto; Kiyotaka Inagaki
- Produced by: Naoki Hashimoto
- Cinematography: Hiroo Yanagida
- Edited by: Naoki Hashimoto
- Music by: Hiroyuki Kozu
- Release date: October 24, 2010 (Tokyo International Film Festival)
- Running time: 108 minutes
- Country: Japan
- Language: Japanese

Birthright (臍帯, Saitai; "Umbilical Cord") is a 2010 Japanese horror film directed, produced, and co-written by Naoki Hashimoto. The film involves a young woman named Mika (Sayoko Oho) who watches the married couple, Minoru Takeda (Hiroshi Sakuma) and his wife Ryoko (Ryoko Takizawa) and their teenage daughter Ayano (Miyu Yagyu) from outside their home. Mika approaches Ayano and says she knows a male student who would like to meet her. Ayano accompanies her only to find that this is all part of Mika's plan to get revenge on her birth mother.

The film premiered at the Tokyo International Film Festival in 2010. It received a theatrical release in Japan in April 2012.

== Release ==
Birthright had its world premiere at the Tokyo International Film Festival on October 24, 2010. The film was shown at several other film festivals including the Fantasia Festival on July 8, 2011, where it had its Canadian premiere. At the Shanghai International Film Festival, the film won a Special Jury Award.

The film was released in Japan in April 2012.

== Reception ==
The Montreal Gazette gave the film a positive review, referring to it as a "powerful film, fuelled by revenge and a seemingly bottomless sadness" while noting that it "does move at a snail’s pace, so impatient people might want to give it a pass." The Hollywood Reporter gave a mixed review to the film, praising the scenes as "Immaculately shot with expressive music and long, mesmeric silences" as well as that "No matter how artful the compositions in this Naoki Hashimoto tone poem, some scenes may sap audience patience."
