= The Romeo Section =

- Genre: Espionage thriller
- Created by: Chris Haddock
- Written by: Chris Haddock; Jesse McKeown; Stephen E. Miller
- Directed by: Stephen Surjik; David Frazee; Chris Haddock; Anne Wheeler; Michael Robison; Amanda Tapping
- Starring: Andrew Airlie; Jemmy Chen; Juan Riedinger; Leeah Wong; Stephanie Bennett; Matt Bellefleur; Sophia Lauchlin Hirt; Mathias Retamal; Eugene Lipinski; Manny Jacinto; Fen Rei; Jorge Montesi; Brian Markinson; Ian Tracey
- Composer: Schaun Tozer
- Country of origin: Canada
- Original language: English
- No. of seasons: 2
- No. of episodes: 20

Production
- Executive producers: Chris Haddock; Laura Lightbown; Stephen Surjik; David Frazee
- Producers: Arvi Liimatainen; John Lenic; Kevin Eastwood
- Production locations: Vancouver, British Columbia, Canada
- Cinematography: Brendan Uegama
- Running time: 44 minutes

Original release
- Network: CBC Television
- Release: October 14, 2015 – December 7, 2016

The Romeo Section is a Canadian spy thriller television series created and written by Chris Haddock which debuted on October 14, 2015, on CBC Television. CBC renewed the series for a second season which began airing on October 5, 2016. The series ran for two seasons.

== Plot ==
=== Season 1 ===
The series follows spymaster Professor Wolfgang McGee, an academic who secretly manages a roster of espionage assets. These assets, referred to as Romeo or Juliet spies, are informants engaged in intimate relations with intelligence targets. Wolfgang himself is a semi-retired Romeo operator, having worked his way up in an officially deniable "service" under the umbrella of Canada's intelligence community. Based in Vancouver, British Columbia, the Romeo and Juliet recruits infiltrate the city’s heroin trade and keep eyes on an asylum seeker, while their handler searches for the elusive faction leader of the Red Mountain Triad.

=== Season 2 ===
In the Le Carré-esque second season, the master of espionage, Wolfgang McGee, steps away from his role of asset handler to investigate an attempted bombing in Vancouver. The case comes to Wolfgang through Harry, a shadowy government figure, who presents the theory that the attack could have been a false flag operation. For help, Wolfgang calls upon an old acquaintance, a black-balled spy named Norman. Together they review the chain of events surrounding the attack to uncover massive holes and blunders, either made by human error or deliberately, as sabotage. To find out which, the two spies investigate the mystery.

Meanwhile, separated from Wolfgang, former assets Rufus and Lily use their Romeo skills to seduce their way up the ladder in the heroin trade and espionage circles.

== Cast ==
- Andrew Airlie as Wolfgang McGee (often going by the name Rupert Holmby for his undercover work)
- Juan Riedinger as Rufus Decker
- Eugene Lipinski as Al Crenshaw (often going by the name Bill West for his undercover work)
- Fei Ren as Mei Mei
- Ian Tracey as Fergie
- Jemmy Chen as Lily Song (season 1)
- Stephanie Bennett as Dee (season 1)
- Matt Bellefleur as Vince Taggart (season 1)
- Manny Jacinto as Wing Lei (season 1)
- Sophia Lauchlin Hirt as Eva Walker (season 1)
- Mathias Retamal as Miguel Padilla (season 1)
- Leeah Wong as Lily Song (season 2)
- Brian Markinson as Norman (season 2)
- Jorge Montesi as Harry (season 2)

== Episodes ==
=== Season 1 (2015) ===
No. overall	No. in season	Title	Directed by	Written by	Original release date	Canada viewers (millions)
1	1	"The China Shop"	Stephen Surjik	Chris Haddock, Jesse McKeown	October 14, 2015	N/A
2	2	"Repel Monkey"	David Frazee	Chris Haddock, Jesse McKeown, Stephen E. Miller	October 21, 2015	N/A
3	3	"West Ocean Ghost"	Chris Haddock	Chris Haddock, Jesse McKeown, Stephen E. Miller	October 28, 2015	N/A
4	4	"Fragrant Harbor"	David Frazee	Chris Haddock, Jesse McKeown, Stephen E. Miller	November 2015	N/A
5	5	"Five Spies"	Anne Wheeler	Chris Haddock, Jesse McKeown, Stephen E. Miller	November 11, 2015	N/A
6	6	"Mandate of Heaven"	David Frazee	Chris Haddock, Jesse McKeown, Stephen E. Miller	November 18, 2015	N/A
7	7	"Whiskey Jack"	Chris Haddock	Chris Haddock, Jesse McKeown, Stephen E. Miller	November 25, 2015	N/A
8	8	"Elephant Faces East"	David Frazee	Chris Haddock, Jesse McKeown, Stephen E. Miller	December 2, 2015	N/A
9	9	"Dragon Fruit"	Chris Haddock	Chris Haddock, Jesse McKeown, Stephen E. Miller	December 9, 2015	N/A
10	10	"A String of Pearls"	David Frazee	Chris Haddock, Jesse McKeown, Stephen E. Miller	December 16, 2015	N/A

=== Season 2 (2016) ===
No. overall	No. in season	Title	Directed by	Written by	Original release date	Canada viewers (millions)
11	1	"The Official Narrative"	Unknown	Unknown	October 5, 2016	N/A
12	2	"The Legwork"	Unknown	Unknown	October 12, 2016	N/A
13	3	"A Rigged Game"	TBA	TBA	TBA	N/A
14	4	"Seeds of War"	Amanda Tapping	TBA	TBA	N/A
15	5	"Incendiary"	TBA	TBA	TBA	N/A
16	6	"Forced Entry"	TBA	TBA	TBA	N/A
17	7	"Rising Tide"	Unknown	Unknown	November 16, 2016	N/A
18	8	"Complicit"	Unknown	Unknown	November 23, 2016	N/A
19	9	"Our Future World"	Unknown	Unknown	November 30, 2016	N/A
20	10	"Final Measures"	Unknown	Unknown	December 7, 2016	N/A
