= Blood in the Snow Canadian Film Festival =

Film festival in Toronto, Canada

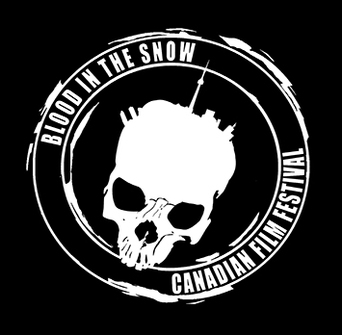
- Status: Active
- Genre: Film festival
- Venue: Isabelle Bader Theatre
- Location: Toronto, Ontario
- Country: Canada
- Inaugurated: 2012; 14 years ago
- Most recent: November 17–22, 2025
- Website: bloodinthesnow.ca

The Blood in the Snow Canadian Film Festival (BITS), also known as Blood in the Snow, is an annual film festival held in Toronto, Ontario, Canada. It was founded in 2012.

The festival has taken place every year in November since 2012. Each year, they present awards dubbed "Bloodies." Described as an event that "fills the seasonal gap between Halloween and Christmas," the festival's programming focuses on Canadian films, horror films, and underground films.

The most recent festival was held from November 17 through November 22, 2025, with Influencers winning the award for Best Film.

== History ==
=== 2012—2021 ===
The festival began in 2012 as spinoff of the monthly film night hosted and programmed by Kelly Micheal Stewart called "Fright Nights at the Projection Booth," which were held at the former Projection Booth Cinema (later re-opened in 2019 as the Grand Gerrard) in Toronto. Running from November 30 to December 2, 2012, the program that year included 6 feature films and 13 shorts, such as Sick: Survive the Night, In The House of Flies, Beyond The Black Rainbow, Devil's Night, Famine, and Blood for Irina.

The 2013 festival, running from November 29 to December 1, 2013, marked the first year the festival utilized a traditional festival submission layout with the introduction of a full programming team. The lineup featured 7 feature films and 16 shorts films, including Evangeline, Thanatomorphose, Ghostkeepers, Blood Riders: The Devil Rides with Us, Clean Break, Criminal, and Discopath. The 2014 festival ran from November 28 to 30, 2014, and saw the lineup expanded to 8 feature films and 15 short films, including Queen of Blood (starring Skinny Puppy's Nivek Ogre), Ejecta, and Black Mountain Side.

The 2015 edition of the festival saw the expansion of the Industry Panels but also saw the shrinking down of the vendor village; the lineup included 8 feature films and 15 shorts, running from November 27 to 29, 2015, with screenings of Night Cries, Secret Santa, White Raven, Farhope Tower, The Dark Stranger, Save Yourself, Bite, and Larry Kent's controversial She Who Must Burn, which won best picture at the festival that year.

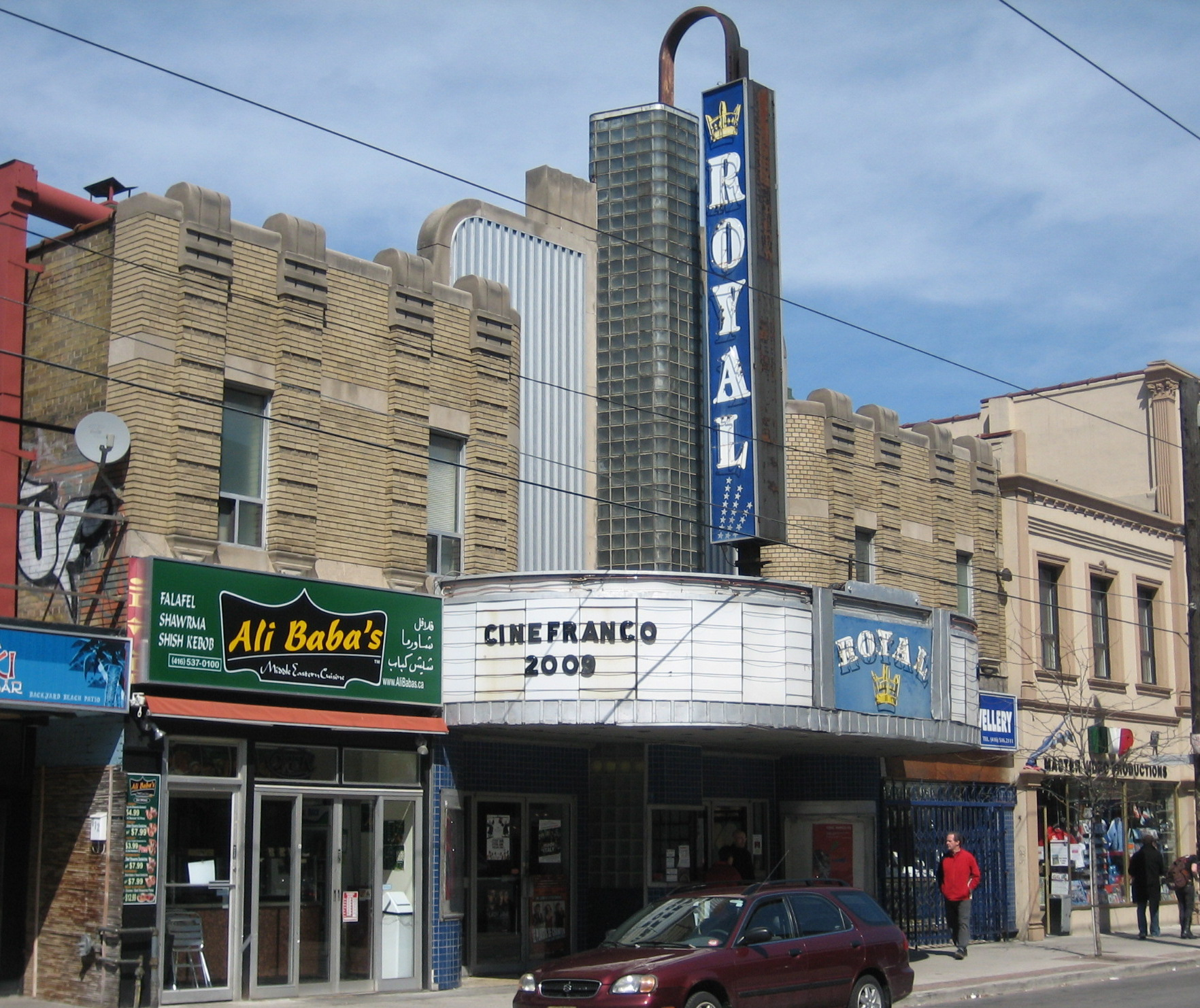
From 2017 until 2021, Blood in the Snow was held at the 390-seat Royal Cinema in Toronto

The 2016 festival moved to the Cineplex cinema at Yonge—Dundas Square and was held from November 24 to November 27, with an expanded 9 features and 24 shorts. The festival also launched its first DVD compilation of short films entitled Blood in the Snow presents: Bloody BITS Shorts Compilation. Films hosted included 3 Dead Trick or Treaters, Streamer, Inspiration, Capture Kill Release, The Sublet, 24 x 36: A Movie about Movie Posters, Holy Hell, Kidnap Capital, and winner of the best picture at that year's festival, The Unseen.

The 2017 edition of the festival saw another venue change as BITS moved to it new home at the Royal Cinema. The move meant the elimination of the traditional midnight show that had been part of the programming since 2012, but saw the festival stay at 4 days in length, running November 23 until November 26, 2017. The move also added another 100 seats in capacity for the festival and attendance numbers continued to grow. Films hosted included Red Spring, Blood Child, Fake Blood, The Child Remains, Buckout Road, Art of Obsession, Kill Order (aka Meza), Darken, and the holiday slasher Once Upon a Time at Christmas. In 2018, the festival was held from November 22 to November 27. That year, it was described as "Canada's largest celebration of Canuck genre film." In 2019, the festival was held from November 21 to November 26, with Gruesome Magazine describing the event as "a unique and imaginative showcase of contemporary Canadian horror, genre, and underground cinema..."

During the COVID-19 pandemic in Canada, the festival partnered with Super Channel Fuse to hold virtual screenings for its 2020 edition. In 2021, the festival launched a development lab for under-represented filmmakers, and it also ran virtual screenings in tandem with limited in-person screenings at the Royal Cinema as the COVID-19 pandemic continued.

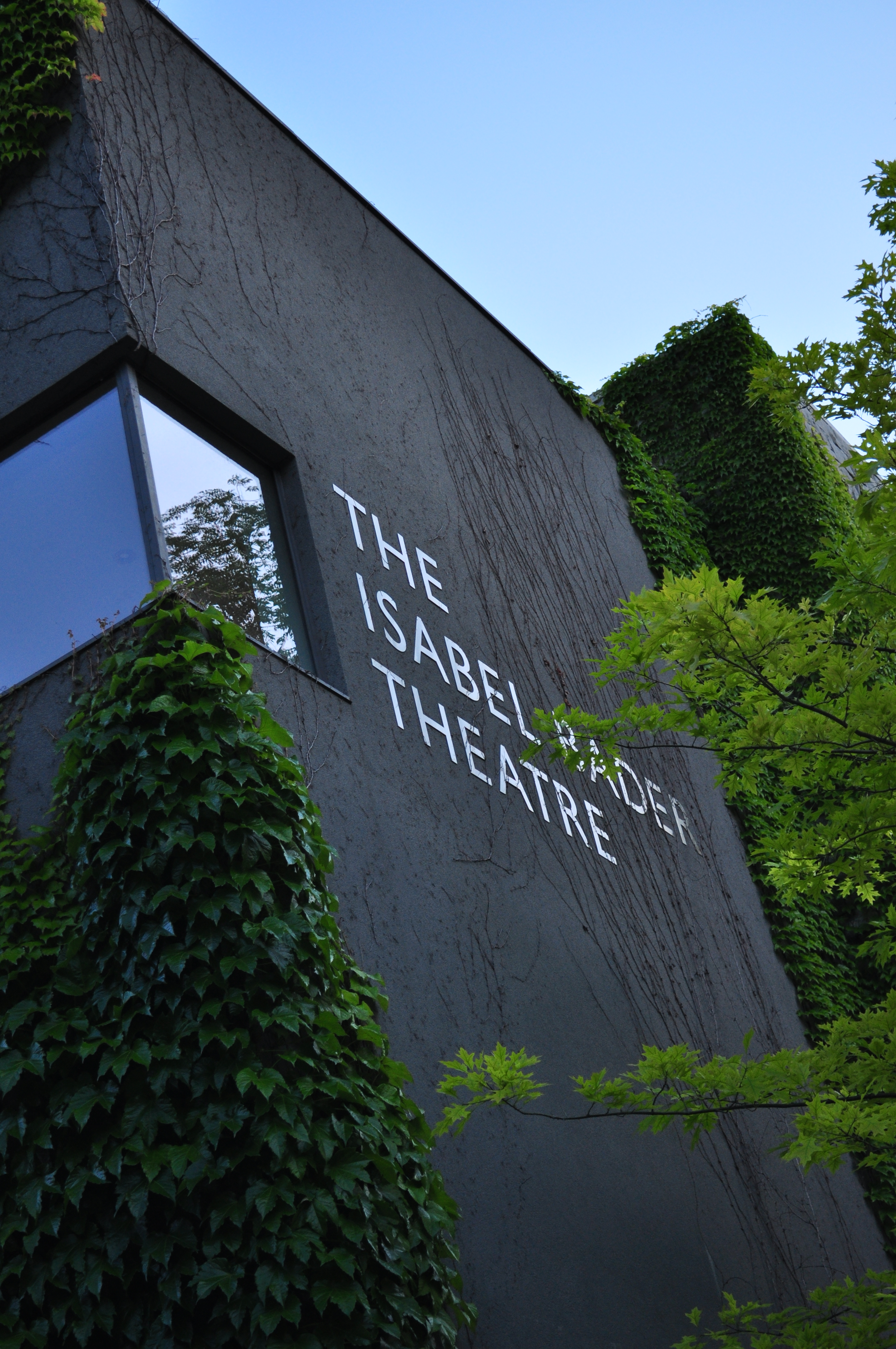
Since 2022, Blood in the Snow has been held at the 500-seat Isabel Bader Theatre in Toronto

=== 2022—present ===
In 2022, the festival moved to the 500-seat Isabel Bader Theatre at the University of Toronto and ran from November 22 until November 26. Since 2022, the festival has been held at the Isabel Bader Theatre.

The 2023 festival ran from November 20 until November 25 and the lineup included the Sundance Film Festival selection My Animal starring Bobbi Salvör Menuez and Amandla Stenberg and other films such as The Last Video Store and The Hyperborean.

The 2024 festival ran from November 18 until November 23 and the lineup included horror films such as Pins and Needles starring Chelsea Clark and Scared Shitless starring Steven Ogg. In 2025, the festival was held from November 17 until November 22, 2025.

The 2025 festival opened with Houston Bone's Son of Sara: Volume 1 starring Chloe Van Landschoot, and it closed with the sequel to Kurtis David Harder's Influencer starring Cassandra Naud ahead of the latter's December 12, 2025 release on Shudder. Influencers won the festival's top award for Best Film.

== Bloodies ==
Each year since 2012, the festival has organized a small jury of film and show business professionals to determine winners of awards called "Bloodies" or "Bloodie Awards."

=== Award nominations and winners ===
Winners are listed first and highlighted in boldface. Between 2012 and 2019, no nominees were announced publicly. Since 2020, nominations have been announced in most categories.

==== 2012 ====
**Best Feature Film**: **In the House of Flies**	**Best Director**: **Gabriel Carrer, In the House of Flies**; **Panos Cosmatos, Beyond the Black Rainbow**; **(tied)**
**Best Actor**: **Ryan Kotack, In the House of Flies**	**Best Actress**: **Lindsay Smith, In the House of Flies**
**Best Cinematography**: **Norm Li, Beyond the Black Rainbow**	**Best Screenplay**: **Angus McLellan, In the House of Flies**
**Best Editing**: **Nicholas T. Shepard, Beyond the Black Rainbow**	**Best Musical Score**: **Chris Alexander, Blood for Irina**
**Best Short Film**: **The Post-Lifers**

==== 2013 ====
**Best Feature Film**: **Discopath**	**Best Director**: **Karen Lam, Evangeline**
**Best Actor**: **Jeremie Earp-Lavergne, Discopath**	**Best Actress**: **Kayden Rose, Thanatomorphose**
**Best Cinematography**: **Michael Balfry, Evangeline**	**Best Screenplay**: **Renaud Gauthier, Discopath**
**Best Special FX**: **David Scherer** **and Remy Couture, Thanatomorphose**	**Best Musical Score**: **Elliot Dawson-Clark, Criminal**
**Best Poster (Feature or Short Film)**: **Tasha and Friends**
**Best Short Film**: **Tasha and Friends**

==== 2014 ====
**Best Feature Film**: **Bloody Knuckles**	**Best Director**: **Chad Archibald** **and Matt Weile, Ejecta**
**Best Actor**: **Julian Richings, Ejecta**	**Best Actress**: **Alyssa King, Berkshire County**
**Best Cinematography**: **Cameron Tremblay, Black Mountain Side**	**Best Screenplay**: **Matt O'Mahoney, Bloody Knuckles**
**Best Special FX**: **Bloody Knuckles**	**Best Musical Score**: **Chris Alexander, Queen of Blood**
**Best Poster (Feature or Short Film)**: **Kyle Hytonen, Massacre at Femur Creek**	**Best Short Film**: **Greater Than**

==== 2015 ====
**Best Feature Film**: **She Who Must Burn**	**Best Director**: **April Mullen, Farhope Tower**
**Best Actor**: **John White, Farhope Tower**	**Best Actress**: **Elma Begovic, Bite**
**Best Cinematography**: **D. Gregor Hagey, The Dark Stranger**	**Best Screenplay**: **Andrew Cymek, Night Cries**
**Best Special FX**: **Jason Derushie,** **Bite**	**Best Musical Score**: **Andre Becker, Secret Santa**
**Best Poster (Feature or Short Film)**: **Brandon Marsh, Bite**	**Best Short Film**: **Chiral**
**Vanguard Award**: **Greg Kovacs, Stephanie Christiaens, Nathan Hawkins, Darren Hutchings, Brad McMillan**

==== 2016 ====
**Best Feature Film**: **The Unseen**	**Best Director**: **Kevin Burke, 24x36: A Movie Poster about Movie Posters**
**Best Actor**: **Aden Young, The Unseen**	**Best Actress**: **Tianna Nori, The Sublet**
**Best Cinematography**: **Greg Biskup, The Sublet**	**Best Screenplay**: **Felipe Rodriguez, Kidnap Capital**
**Best Special FX**: **Carolyn Williams,** **Madre De Dios**	**Best Musical Score**: **Stephen Schooley, 3 Dead Trick or Treaters**
**Best Editing**: **Kevin Burke, 24x36: A Movie Poster about Movie Posters**	**Best Ensemble Cast**: **Kidnap Capital**
**Best Poster (Feature or Short Film)**: **Paul Ainsworth, Joshua Budich, Sara Deck, Gary Pullin, Matt Tobin, 24x36: A Movie Poster about Movie Posters**	**Best Short Film**: **Cauchemar Capitonne**
**Vanguard Award**: **Greg Kovacs, Stephanie Christiaens, Nathan Hawkins, Darren Hutchings, Brad McMillan**
**Rising Star Award**: **Jennifer Fraser, Capture Kill Release**

==== 2017 ====
**Best Feature Film**: **The Curse of Buckout Road**	**Best Director**: **Audrey Cummings, Darken**
**Best Actor**: **Jeff Sinasac, Red Spring**	**Best Actress**: **Suzanne Clément, The Child Remains**
**Best Cinematography**: **James Griffith, Darken**	**Best Screenplay**: **Matthew Currie Holmes** **and Shahin Chandrasoma, The Curse of Buckout Road**
**Best Special FX**: **Kill Order**	**Best Musical Score**: **Jim McGrath, Darken**
**Best Editing**: **Rob Grant, Fake Blood**	**Best Ensemble Cast**: **Art of Obsession**
**Best Poster (Feature or Short Film)**: **Darken**	**Best Short Film**: **Bestia**
**Vanguard Award**: **Ry Barrett**
**Rising Star Award**: **Alyx Melone, Blood Child and Talking Heads**

==== 2018 ====
**Best Feature Film**: **Montreal Dead End**	**Best Director**: **Danishka Esterhazyv, Level 16**
**Best Actor**: **Josh Collins, Hammer of the Gods**	**Best Actress**: **Katie Douglas, Level 16**
**Best Cinematography**: **Michael Jari Davidson, SuperGrid**	**Best Screenplay**: **Danishka Esterhazyv, Level 16**
**Best Special FX**: **Alive**	**Best Musical Score**: **Spencer Creaghan, Altered Skin**
**Best Editing**: **Matt Welie and Jesse Thomas Cook, The Hoard**	**Best Ensemble Cast**: **Montreal Dead End**
**Best Poster (Feature or Short Film)**: **Small Dog Design, Altered Skin**	**Best Short Film**: **Lay Them Straight**
**Best Web Series**: **Necessary Evil**	**Most Promising Debut**: **Frostbite**
**Vanguard Award**: **Jesse Thomas Cook**
**Rising Star Award**: **Danishka Esterhazyv, Level 16**

==== 2019 ====
**Best Feature Film**: **Z**	**Best Director**: **Brandon Christensen, Z**
**Best Actor**: **Heston Horwin, Dead Dicks**	**Best Actress**: **Oluniké Adeliyi, She Never Died**
**Best Cinematography**: **Julian Garofalo, The Nights Before Christmas**	**Best Screenplay**: **Chris Bavota and Lee Paula Springer, Dead Dicks**
**Best Special FX**: **Ryan Nicholson, Puppet Killer**	**Best Musical Score**: **Joee Cons and Mike Bistani with Hatiras, Raveage**
**Best Editing**: **Jeremy Lutter, Giltrude's Dwelling**	**Best Ensemble Cast**: **Happy Face**
**Best Web Series**: **Deep Six**	**Best Podcast**: **Witch Finger Horror Podcast**
**Best Poster (Feature or Short Film)**: **One in Two People**	**Best Short Film**: **Romi**
**Vanguard Award**: **Audrey Cummings, She Never Died**
**Rising Star Award**: **Chris Bavota and Lee Paula Springer, Dead Dicks**

==== 2020 ====
**Best Feature Film**: **Come True**; Anything for Jackson; Parallel Minds	**Best Director**: **Francesco Giannini, Hall**; Amelia Moses, Bloodthirsty; Anthony Scott Burns, Come True
**Best Actor**: **Julian Richings, Anything for Jackson**; Greg Bryk, Bloodthirsty; Nick Smyth, For the Sake of Vicious	**Best Actress**: **Julia Sarah Stone, Come True**; Lora Burke, For the Sake of Vicious; Sheila McCarthy, Anything for Jackson
**Best Cinematography (Feature or Short Film)**: **Anthony Scott Burns, Come True**; Alfonso Chin, Freya; Jeff Maher, Parallel Minds	**Best Screenplay (Feature or Short Film)**: **Anthony Scott Burns, Come True**; Derrick Adams and Adam Colony, Hall; Hugo Chetelat, Rembobine (Rewind)
**Ryan Nicholson Special Makeup Effects Award**: **Boriana Karan, Come True**; Remi Couture, Hall; Dera Veinot and The Butcher Shop, For the Sake of Vicious	**Best Musical Score**: **Anthony Scott Burns, Come True**; Gabriel Carrer and Foxgrndr, For the Sake of Vicious; Cédric Martel, Rembobine (Rewind)
**Best Editing**: **Steve Villeneuve, Hail to the Deadites**; Anthony Scott Burns, Come True; Lucas Villegas, Hall	**Best Ensemble Cast**: **For the Sake of Vicious** **(awarded to the stunt team)**; Anything for Jackson; Hall
**Best Poster (Feature or Short Film)**: **Hail to the Deadites**; Clout; Fade	**Best Short Film**: **Toto**; Freya; Rembobine (Rewind)
**Best Digital Series**: **Eslura: The First Monolith**; All The Wrong things in the Right Places; Zahara: The Return

==== 2021 ====
**Best Picture**: **Vicious Fun**; Peppergrass; The Righteous	**Best Director**: **Cody Calahan, Vicious Fun**; Mark O'Brien, The Righteous; Seth A. Smith, Tin Can
**Best Lead Acting Performance in a Feature Film**: **Sera-Lys McArthur, Don't Say Its Name**; Henry Czerny, The Righteous; Evan Marsh, Vicious Fun	**Best Supporting Acting Performance in a Feature Film**: **Benjamin Charles Watson, The Family**; Ari Millen, Vicious Fun; Madison Walsh, Don't Say Its Name
**Best Cinematography**: **Scott McClellan, The Righteous**; Billy Buttery, Flee The Light; Kevin A. Fraser, Tin Can	**Best Screenplay**: **Rueben Martell and Gerald Wexler, Don't Say Its Name**; Anton Jøsef and Lisi Purr, Break Any Spell; Seth A. Smith and Darcy Spidle, Tin Can
**Best Special FX**: **The Chamber of Terror**; Tin Can; Vicious Fun	**Best Editing**: **Jason William Lee, Funhouse**; Mike Gallant, Vicious Fun; Seth A. Smith, Tin Can
**Best Poster (Feature or Short Film)**: **Peppergrass**; He Comes at Night; Kweskosiw (she whistles)
**Best Short Film**: **They're Here**; That Halloween; We All Dream	**Best Micro-Short Film**: **Little Red**; Babysitting; Breakfast
**Best Lead Acting Performance in a Short Film**: **Sera-Lys McArthur, Kweskosiw (she whistles)**; Onna Chan, Red String of Fate; Mya McNair, Ella	**Best Supporting Acting Performance in a Short Film**: **Grace McDonald, Duppy**; Aidan Devine, Kweskosiw (she whistles); Bronwen Mantel, They're Here
**Best Digital Series**: **Narcoleap: Season Two**; Creepy Bits; Revenge of the Snowflakes

==== 2022 ====
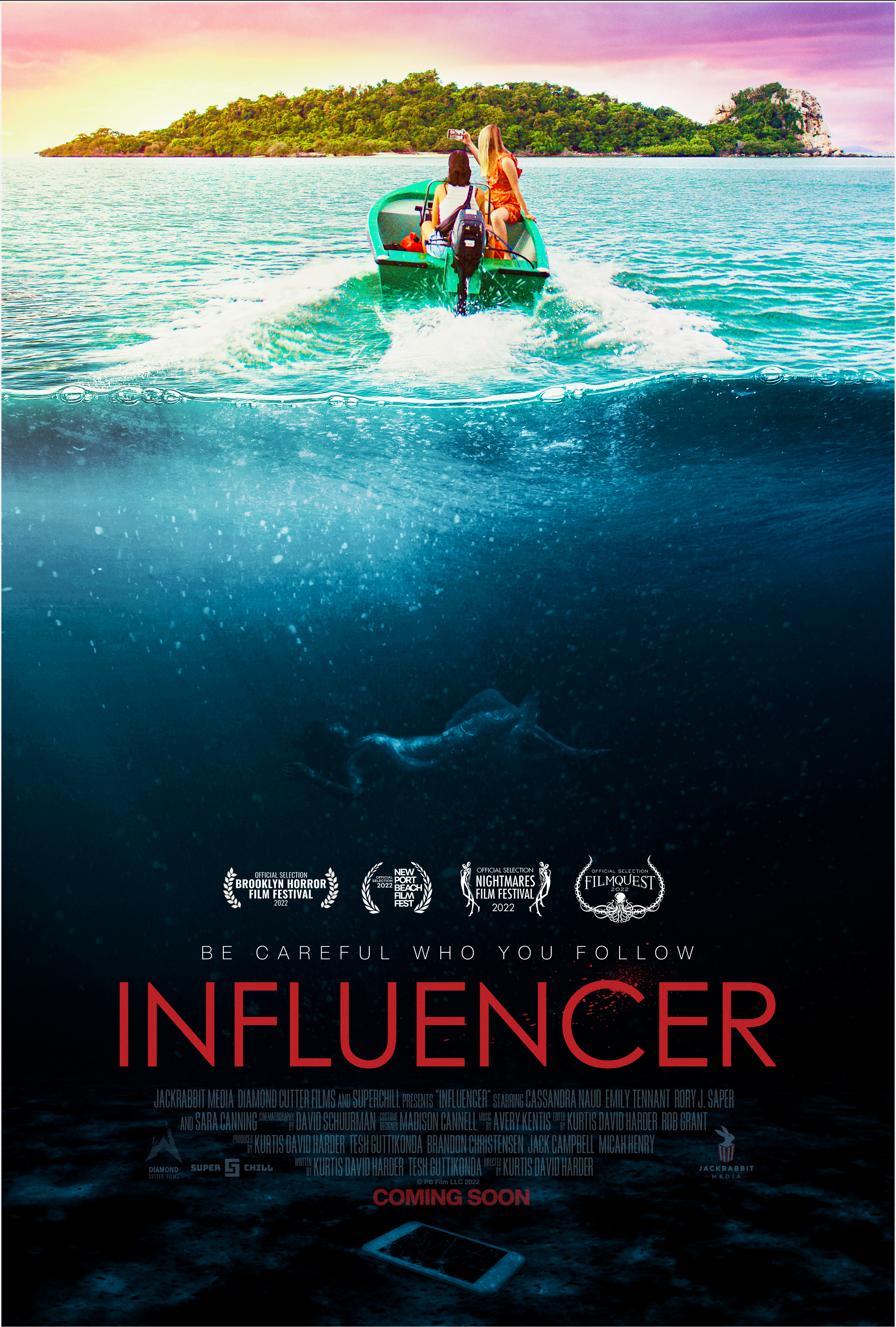
Poster for Influencer, 2022 award winner

**Best Picture**: **Relax, I'm from the Future**; Dark Nature; The Inhuman	**Best Director**: **Berkley Brady, Dark Nature**; Jason Brennan, The Inhuman; Jesse Thomas Cook, Cult Hero
**Best Lead Acting Performance in a Feature Film**: **Cassandra Naud, Influencer**; Rhys Darby, Relax, I'm From the Future; Samuel Tremblay, The Inhuman	**Best Supporting Acting Performance in a Feature Film**: **Gabrielle Graham, Relax, I'm From the Future**; Liv Collins Cook, Cult Hero; Madison Walsh, Dark Nature
**Best Cinematography**: **David Schuurman, Influencer**; Jaryl Lim, Dark Nature; Liam Meredith, Darkside	**Best Screenplay**: **Kurtis David Harder and Tesh Guttikonda, Influencer**; Jason Brennan, The Inhuman; Lukas Higgenson, Relax, I'm From The Future
**Best Special FX**: **Daniel Baker and Chris Cooper, The Breach**; Shantel Capri and Kyra Macpherson, Dark Nature; Benjamin McGregor, Darkside	**Best Editing (Feature or Short Film)**: **Amélie Labrèche, The Inhuman**; Evan Derushie, Daniel Dietzel, Maia Iotzova, Angakusajaujuq: The Shaman's Apprentice; Alex Gans, Follow Her
**Best Musical Score**: **Adrian Ellis, Cult Hero**; Alain Auger, The Inhuman; Avery Kentis, Influencer	**Best Poster**: **Cult Hero**; The Breach; Shifted
**Best Short Film**: **Angakusajaujuq: The Shaman's Apprentice**; Darkside; Death & the Mysteries of Raising Powerful Children; L'Abattu des Vents (The Wind Down); One of Those Good Lives
**Best Lead Acting Performance in a Short Film**: **Blakely David, Darkside**; Sean Depner, One of Those Good Lives; Miley Haik, Last Christmas	**Best Supporting Acting Performance in a Short Film**: **Daniel Coo, Vicinal**; Madison Cheeatow, Last Christmas; Donald Sales, One of Those Good Lives
**Best Digital Series**: **Shadow of the Rougarou**; CCF's Solstice Stories; The Forest King

==== 2023 ====
**Best Picture**: **The Last Video Store**; My Animal; Tales From the Rez	**Best Director**: **Jacqueline Castel, My Animal**; Cody Kennedy and Tim Rutherford, The Last Video Store; Sinakson Trevor Solway, Tales from The Rez
**Best Lead Acting Performance in a Feature Film**: **Kaelen Ohm, Last County**; Tim Rozon, Purgatory Jack; Bobbi Salvör Menuez, My Animal	**Best Supporting Acting Performance in a Feature Film**: **Gord Rand, Last County**; Eugene Brave Rock, Tales from the Rez; Amandla Stenberg, My Animal
**Best Cinematography**: **Bryn McCashin, My Animal**; Daniel Everitt-Lock, Purgatory Jack; Benji Irwin, The Last Video Store; Patrick McLaughlin, Romi	**Best Screenplay**: **Jae Matthews, My Animal**; Sean Kohnen and Matthew Kohnenl, Last County; Tim Rutherford, Joshua Roach, The Last Video Store
**Best Editing**: **Cody Kennedy, The Last Video Store**; Mikaela Bodin, Scott Richter, Last County; Bridget Durnford, Romi; Rémi Fréchette, The Dam	**Best Sound Design**: **Sylvain Bellemare, White Noise**; Frank Laratta, Romi; Dean Hurley, My Animal
**Ryan Nicholson Special Makeup Effects Award**: **ZIP**; My Animal; The Last Video Store; Saint-Sacrifice
**Best Short Film**: **Orest Leere and His Marvelous, Mysterious, Malicious Empathy Machine**; Saint-Sacrifice; T-Bone; White Noise
**Best Lead Acting Performance in a Short Film**: **Jean Yoon, T-Bone**; Jag Dhaliwal, Solitary; Julian Richings, T-Bone	**Best Supporting Acting Performance in a Short Film**: **Tyler Grace, The Suckamoto Sales Incident**; Sean Baek, Cold; Kelly Hope Taylor, Ivan

==== 2024 ====
**Best Picture**: **Scared Shitless**; Hunting Matthew Nichols; The Silent Planet	**Best Director**: **Markian Tarasiuk, Hunting Matthew Nichols**; Joslyn Rogers, The Living Room; Jeffrey St. Jules, The Silent Planet
**Best Lead Acting Performance in a Feature Film**: **Ayisha Issa, Dark Match**; Chelsea Clark, Pins and Needles; Miranda MacDougall, Hunting Matthew Nichols	**Best Supporting Acting Performance in a Feature Film**: **Elias Koteas, The Silent Planet**; Daniel Doheny, Scared Shitless; Steven Ogg, Dark Match
**Best Cinematography**: **Nigel Markham, Bedlamer**; Karim Hussain, Dark Match; Kaayla Whachell, The Sorrow	**Best Screenplay**: **Jeffrey St. Jules, The Silent Planet**; Monica La Vella, Invited; Joslyn Rogers, The Living Room
**Best Editing**: **Arielle Skolnik, How To Stay Awake**; Tiffany Beaudin and Jeffrey St. Jules, The Silent Planet; Vincent Ruel-Côté, Mean Ends	**Best Sound Design**: **Tales from the Void: “Whistle in the Woods”**; Pins and Needles; How To Stay Awake
**Special Makeup Effects Award**: **Scared Shitless**; Dungeon of Death; Night Lab	**Best Musical Score**: **David Arcus, Terry Benn, Michelle Osis, Stew Kirkwood, Dark Match**; Vincenzo Nappi, Oh... Canada; Benjamin Hackman and Anthony William Wallace, Out of the Hands of the Wicked
**Best Short Film**: **The Living Room**; Defile; The Sorrow	**Best Lead Acting Performance in a Short Film**: **Nhi Do, The Sorrow**; Celestine Caravaggio, Apnea; Corrine Koslo, Shiva
**Vanguard Award**: **Chelsea Clark**

==== 2025 ====
Poster for Son of Sara: Volume 1, 2025 award winner

**Best Picture**: **Influencers**; Buffet Infinity; Foreigner	**Best Director**: **Kurtis David Harder, Influencers**; Houston Bone, Son of Sara: Volume 1; Simon Glassman, Buffet Infinity; Ava Maria Safai, Foreigner
**Best Lead Acting Performance in a Feature Film**: **Chloe Van Landschoot, Son of Sara: Volume 1**; Cassandra Naud, Influencers; Rose Dehgan, Foreigner	**Best Supporting Acting Performance in a Feature Film**: **Maddie Hasson, Violence**; Jane Moffat, Son of Sara: Volume 1; Emily Tennant, Influencers
**Best Cinematography**: **David Schuurman, Influencers**; Vincent Biron, Violence; Dmitry Lopatin, Son of Sara: Volume 1; Saarthak Taneja, Foreigner	**Best Screenplay**: **Ava Maria Safai, Foreigner**; Kurtis David Harder, Influencers; Simon Glassman, Buffet Infinity
**Best Editing in a Feature Film**: **Robert Grant & Kurtis David Harder, Influencers**; Kevan Byrne, Nash the Slash Rises, Again; Mark Hussey, Violence	**Best Special FX (Makeup) in a Feature Film**: **The Butcher Shop, Fresh Meat**; The Butcher Shop, Violence; Daniella Pluchino, Son of Sara: Volume 1
**Best Musical Score**: **Nowhere2run, Violence**; Avery Kentis, Influencers; Spencer Creaghan, Son of Sara: Volume 1	**Best Short Film**: **Zoé**; Echo; He
**Best Lead Acting Performance in a Short Film**: **Nisha Coleman, Zoé**; Jordan Alexander, Echo; Jane Moffat, Time Eater; Chloe Van Landschoot, Heirloom	**Best Supporting Acting Performance in a Short Film**: **Patrice Dubois, Hammer, Wrench and Screwdriver (Marteau, clé anglaise & tournevis)**; Hannah Klamann, Tingling; Heather Gardner, My Friend Saabe
**Best Digital or Web Series**: **Ominous**; Ghosting; Jeff Dotter: Space Courier
**The "Indestructible" Award for Best Promising Filmmaker**: **Morningstar Derosier**; Dylan Pun; Rémy St-Michel

== Associated projects ==
=== Late Night Double Feature ===
In 2014, the team behind the Blood in the Snow Canadian Film Festival made an anthology film called Late Night Double Feature. The film premiered at the 2014 New York City Horror Film Festival, and it was later picked up for distribution by Parade Deck Films in North America. Late Night Double Feature won "Best in Horror" at the 2015 Hot Springs International Horror Film Festival, and it received a 3 out of 4 rating from Fangoria.

== See also ==
- List of fantastic and horror film festivals
