= Sarah Smyth =

Canadian actress

- Born: October 12, 1982 (age 43); Nova Scotia, Canada
- Occupation: Actress
- Years active: 2002–present
- Spouse: Andrew Dunbar (2018-present)
- Children: 2

Sarah Smyth (born October 12, 1982) is a Canadian actress who starred on the three seasons of the Canadian show Naked Josh and known for 50/50 (2011), Percy Jackson & the Olympians: The Lightning Thief (2010), Alien Trespass (2009) and 12 Rounds 3: Lockdown (2015).

== Filmography ==
=== Film ===
Year	Title	Role	Notes
2002	Parkwood Hills	Sarah	Short
2002	Confessions of a Dangerous Mind	Tina	
2004	Decoys	Rosedale Princess	
2006	Crossing the Wake	Sarah	
2006	The Covenant	Kira Snider	
2008	Lost Boys: The Tribe	Hayden	Video
2009	Alien Trespass	Penny	
2010	Crazy Little Thing	Samantha	Short
2010	Percy Jackson & the Olympians: The Lightning Thief	Pretty Girl #1	
2011	50/50	Jenny	
2011	Foreverland	Penny	
2014	Hastings Street	Peggy	Video
2015	She Who Must Burn	Angela	
2015	12 Rounds 3: Lockdown	Off. Jenny Taylor	
2015	White Raven	Kim	
2016	Haley	Female Survivor	Short
2018	Bad Times at the El Royale	Ginger Miller	

=== Television ===
Year	Title	Role	Notes
2002	Big Wolf on Campus	Jenny	Episode: "Dances Without Wolves"
2002	Vampire High	Amy Todman	Episode: "Little Sister"
2002	Undressed	Julie	Main role (season 6)
2003	Student Seduction	Monica Corelli	TV film
2004–2006	Naked Josh	Natalie Bouchard	Main role (26 episodes)
2007	Lethal Obsession	Amy Palmieri	TV film
2007–2009	Durham County	Maggie Travis	Recurring role (5 episodes)
2009	Smallville	Suzie Turpin	Episode: "Bulletproof"
2009	Harper's Island	Lucy Daramour	2 episodes
2009	Killer Hair	Tammi	TV film
2009	Phantom Racer	Young Tammy	TV film
2009, 2011	Stargate Universe	Annie Balic	2 episodes
2010	Human Target	Emily	Episode: "Sanctuary"
2010	Shattered	Susan Collins	Episode: "Tears Bring Harry"
2010	Tower Prep	Jenny Peasly	Episode: "Field Trip"
2011	Jack of Diamonds	Lane Merrin	TV film
2011	Endgame	Lydia Beckett	Episode: "I Killed Her"
2012	The Pregnancy Project	Claire	TV film
2012	Duke	Alice Polesky	TV film
2013	Blink	Kayla	TV film
2013	Call Me Fitz	Paula	Recurring role (7 episodes)
2013–2015	Cedar Cove	Justine Lockhart	Main role (36 episodes)
2014, 2020	Supernatural	Bess Fitzgerald	2 episodes
2014	Motive	Ingrid Jenkins	Episode: "Pitfall"
2016	The Mistletoe Promise	Ashley	TV film
2017	Christmas Getaway	Alice Bennett	TV film
2017, 2020–2021, 2023	When Calls the Heart	Mary Wolf	5 episodes
2017	The Bletchley Circle: San Francisco	Patricia Crawford	2 episodes
2018	A Twist of Christmas	Brooke	TV film
2018–2019	Supergirl	Lydia Lockwood	4 episodes
2019	Unspeakable	Jenny Gould	2 episodes
2021	Love in Full Swing		TV movie
