= White Raven =

(The) White Raven may refer to:

== Books ==
- The White Raven (novel), a 2009 novel by Robert Low
- The White Raven, a 1995 novel by Michael Blodgett
- Biały Kruk, translated as White Raven in English, a 1995 novel by Andrzej Stasiuk

== Films ==
- The White Raven (1917 film), a silent drama film
- The White Raven (1998 film), an action crime thriller based on the Michael Blodgett novel
- White Raven (2015 film), a Canadian horror film
- Sniper: The White Raven, a Ukrainian war film

== Other uses ==
- Raven, a bird that is usually black, very rarely white
- White Raven (opera), a 1998 opera by Philip Glass
- White Raven, the second life of Raven, a superheroine in DC Comics
- White raven, animals in the book series The Edge Chronicles by Paul Stewart and Chris Riddell
- White Ravens, awards organized by the International Youth Library
- A metaphor for any rare or completely non-existent object, from the raven paradox
- The Anchorage White Raven, an individual raven
