= Chelsea Clark (actress) =

Canadian actress (born 1998)

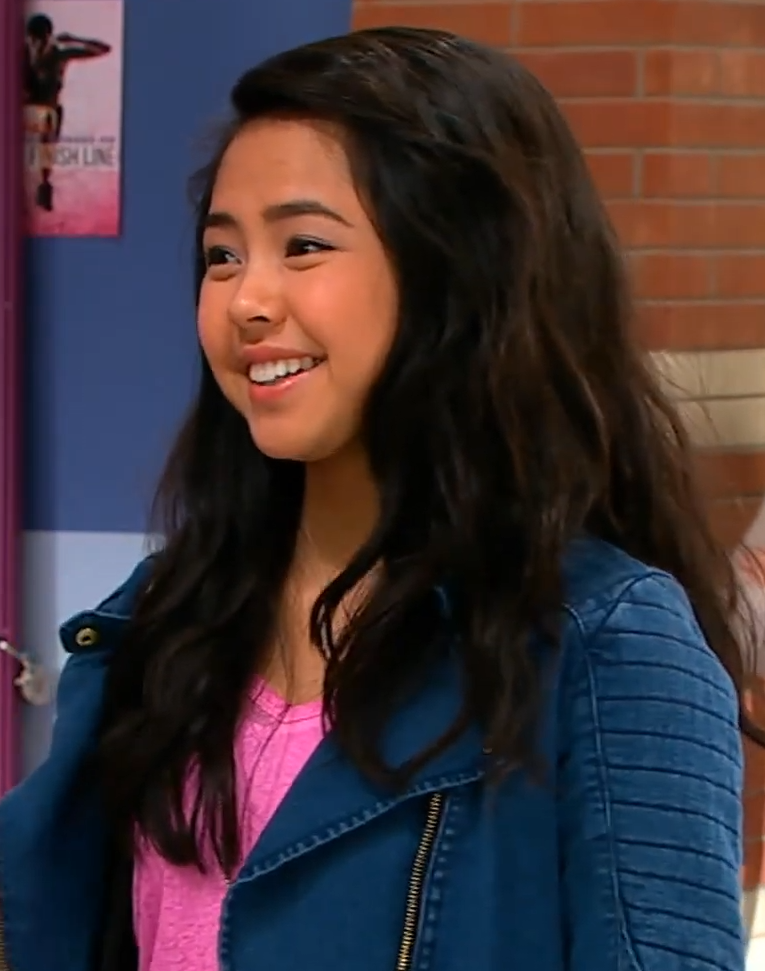
- Clark in The Stanley Dynamic in 2015.
- Born: May 5, 1998 (age 28); Toronto, Ontario, Canada
- Occupation: Actress
- Years active: 2010–present
- Known for: Degrassi: Next Class; Ginny and Georgia

Chelsea Clark (born May 5, 1998) is a Canadian actress. She is known for playing both Esme Song in Degrassi: Next Class and Norah in Netflix's Ginny & Georgia.

== Personal life ==
Clark attended the University of Toronto. She has competed at the international level in dragon boat racing. Her mother is Filipino and her father is White.

== Career ==
Clark first appeared in the television series Rookie Blue (2010) and Life with Boys (2011). She landed a starring role as Esme Song for four seasons of the long-running Canadian television series Degrassi: Next Class; Clark worked on the series from 2016 to 2017. During that time, Clark was nominated for Best Series Regular or Leading Actress in a TV Series 16 Years & Over at the 2017 Joey Awards for her role in Degrassi: Next Class. Clark also won Best actress in a short film at the 2017 Joey Awards for her performance in Blue Heart Emoji.

In 2019, Clark was part of the ensemble for Winnifred Jong's comedy web series Tokens, which was nominated for best ensemble at the ACTRA Awards in 2020.

Beginning in 2021, Clark played Norah, a member of the MANG group (Max, Abby, Norah, Ginny), in the Netflix television series Ginny & Georgia. After the second season's release, Ginny & Georgia became the most-watched title from January to June 2023 on Netflix, with a combined 967.2M hours viewed between seasons one and two. In May 2023, Ginny & Georgia was renewed for a third and fourth season. The third season was released on June 5, 2025.

Around this time, Clark began to dabble in projects linked to the horror genre. Clark played a lead role in Lenin M. Sivam's thriller film The Protector, which premiered at the Fantasia International Film Festival on July 28, 2022. Clark also starred in five episodes of the 2022 web series Ezra; she was also credited as a producer, writer, and director. In 2024, Clark starred in two horror films which screened at the Blood in the Snow Film Festival in Toronto: Pins & Needles and Scared Shitless. At that year's festival, Clark won the Vanguard Award.

== Filmography ==
=== Film ===
Film
Year	Title	Role	Notes
2010	The Overture	Geraldine	Short film
2017	Blue Heart Emoji	Her	Short film
2018	Greta Follows Rivers	Sasha	Short film
2019	Resolve	Allie	Short film
2022	The Protector	Evelyn	Film
2024	Scared Shitless	Patricia	Film
TBA	Pins & Needles	Max	Post-production

=== Television ===
Television
Year	Title	Role	Notes
2010	Rookie Blue	Dhara Singh	Season 1, episode 7: "Hot and Bothered"
2011	Life with Boys	Stacey	3 episodes
2015	The Stanley Dynamic	Chelsea	5 episodes
2016	Degrassi: Next Class Webisodes	Esme Song	Main role
2016–2017	Degrassi: Next Class	Esme Song	Main role; 28 episodes
2018	Good Witch	Katie	Season 4, episode 6: "Match Game"
2019	Tokens	Roxy	4 episodes
2020	Let's Go Luna!	uestEverq moneKati / Patra	Voice; Season 2, episode 12: "The Mystery of the Mask/Movie Monday"
2021	Kung Fu	Chloe Soong	3 episodes
2021–present	Ginny & Georgia	Norah	30 episodes
2022	Hudson & Rex	Imari Johnson	Season 4, episode 9: "Impawster Syndrome"
2022	Ezra	Kylo Konstine	5 episodes

== Awards and nominations ==
Year	Award	Category	Nominated work	Result	Ref.
2017	Joey Awards	Best actress in a short film	Blue Heart Emoji	Won	
2017	Joey Awards	Best Series Regular or Leading Actress in a TV Series 16 Years & Over	Degrassi: Next Class	Nominated	
2019	ACTRA Awards	Best Ensemble (shared)	Tokens	Nominated	
2024	Blood in the Snow Film Festival ("Bloodies")	Vanguard Award	Pins & Needles, Scared Shitless	Won	
