= Jody Thompson =

Canadian actress

- Born: Jody Rae Thompson
- Occupations: Actress; producer; director; screenwriter; editor; production designer; anchor; presenter
- Years active: 1996–present
- Website: https://vimeo.com/lwpcreative

Jody Rae Thompson is a Canadian actress, screenwriter and filmmaker working in film and television.

== Acting career ==
=== Television ===
She is widely known for her regularly recurring character Devon Moore on the USA network's television series The 4400, but is also recognized as the warrior queen Azura in the television series Flash Gordon and in other recurring television roles including Blade: The Series, Terminal City, and Cold Squad and television appearances, including roles on Freedom, Fringe, Andromeda, Stargate SG1, Smallville and Supernatural.

=== Film ===
She has acted in leading and starring roles in feature films and MOW's like Perfect Little Angels, Fear of Flying, also Mission to Mars, Shanghai Noon, 2012 among others. She has co-starred with Eric McCormack in X-Files producer Bob Goodwin's independent film Alien Trespass and played David Arquette's wife in the made-for-television movie, Happy Face Killer.

== Producing career ==
Great Bear (doc 22 min) A Coastal First Nations led collaboration with researchers from leading academic universities provides insights into the importance of bears and other keystone species to the ecosystems of the Great Bear Rainforest. The documentary was coproduced with the Heiltsuk and Kitasoo/Xai'xais Nations.

Spirit Bear (doc 20 min) Discover how the Spirit Bear Lodge - operated by the Kitasoo/Xai'Xai Nation - is revitalizing their community and demonstrating how sustainable practices can succeed economically, environmentally and culturally.

Haida Gwaii: Restoring the Balance (doc 20 min) Building a model for a sustainable, conservation-based economy. In partnership with Haida Nation.

Montaña de Luz, (doc 45 min), Noonday Films. It is an uplifting story about a Honduran orphanage that cares for children living with HIV. The film premiered at the Rhode Island International Film Festival and was Winner of the Heartland Film Festival's Crystal Heart Award (an award which "honors filmmakers whose work explores the human journey by artistically expressing hope and respect for the positive values of life").[8] My Dear Children (doc 3 min) A dying woman's final letter to her children. Platinum Winner AVA International Digital Communication Awards.

Will of the Wisp, (experimental 8 min) underscoring a young woman's struggle with her history of sexual abuse in a society that places high value on sexual attractiveness. Received a special screening at the US Women in Psychology Conference, a Leo Award, Special Jury Prize at the Portland International Short-Short Film Festival and the Legacy Award, Women in Film Festival Vancouver. Funded by The Canada Council for the Arts. Thompson describes it as, "a silent film that speaks through a series of post-structuralist and surrealist signifiers in conversation."

Alyssa (doc series 3 x 5 min) In partnership with Dalhousie University. A young woman coming to terms with her diagnosis and undergoing chemo, thereby forfeiting her ability to have children. Acknowledged as an outstanding initiative by the Canadian Association of Psychosocial Oncology. It stars Rhonda Dent and Gabrielle Rose of The Sweet Hereafter.

== Screenwriting career ==
Jody has written multiple feature and television scripts. She is an Academy Nicholl Fellowship Semifinalist and a Page Award winner.

== Personal life ==
Thompson was born in Vancouver, British Columbia, to mother Grace Diane, and father, Ray Thompson, the lead singer of Canadian garage rock band The Wiggy Symphony. She has been married to Bruce Marchfelder since 2001. The couple regularly works together writing and producing feature films and broadcast documentaries.

== Filmography ==
=== Film ===
Year	Title	Role	Notes
1999	Turbulence 2: Fear of Flying	Stacey	
1999	Coffee	Lucy	Short film
2000	Shanghai Noon	Margie	
2002	Hellraiser: Hellseeker	Tawny	Video
2002	Deadly Little Secrets	Stacy	
2007	Will of the Wisp	Nora	Short film; director, producer, writer
2009	Alien Trespass	Lana	
2010	30 Days of Night: Dark Days	Lena	Video
2010	Alyssa		Short film; director, producer, writer
2012	Barricade	Leah Shade	

=== Television ===
Year	Title	Role	Notes
1997	Breaker High	Jenny	"That Lip-Synching Feeling"
1997	Death Game	Tori	TV film
1998	Perfect Little Angels	Justine Freedman	TV film
1999	Cold Feet	Valerie	"Girls' Night Out, Boys' Night In"
1999	Night Man	Morgan	"Spellbound"
1999	Viper	Rita Brooks	"Of Course, It's a Miracle"
1999	Don't Look Behind You	Mary	TV film
2000	Secret Agent Man	Ellen	"Supernaked"
2001	Big Sound	Sherry	"New Dog, Old Tricks"
2001	Freedom	Alice Kramer	"Return"
2001	UC: Undercover	Mona	"City on Fire"
2001	Special Unit 2	Heather	"The Beast"
2002	Beyond Belief: Fact or Fiction	Stacey Gilmore	1 episode
2003	Just Cause	Kim Dayton	"Dying to Be Thin"
2003	Andromeda	Azazel	"Point of the Spear"
2003	John Doe	Cara	"Shock to the System"
2003	A Date with Darkness: The Trial and Capture of Andrew Luster	Amy	TV film
2004	Cold Squad	Carmen Janega	"Girlfriend in a Closet"
2005	Cold Squad	Carmen Janega	"Mr. Bad Example"
2005	Terminal City	Tamara	TV miniseries
2005–2007	The 4400	Devon Moore	Recurring role
2006	Killer Instinct	Karin	"She's the Bomb"
2006	Godiva's	Donna	"Dead Flowers"
2006	Supernatural	Ann Telesca	"Provenance"
2006	Blade: The Series	Glynnis	"The Evil Within", "Sacrifice", "Turn of the Screw"
2006	In Her Mother's Footsteps	Gina Byrnes	TV film
2006	The Secrets of Comfort House	Missy	TV film
2006	Smallville	Gia	"Fade"
2007	Painkiller Jane	Vivian Nash	"The League"
2007	Perfect Child	Monica	TV film
2007	Blood Ties	Lexia	"Bugged"
2007	Flash Gordon	Azura	"Secrets and Lies"
2007	Stargate SG-1	Female assassin	"Bounty"
2008	Flash Gordon	Azura	"Revolution: Part 2"
2009	Stargate Atlantis	Nurse	"Vegas"
2010	A Trace of Danger	Jenna	TV film
2011	Fringe	Sara Downey	"Concentrate and Ask Again"
2011	Sanctuary	Fallon	"Pax Romana", "Into the Black", "Uprising"
2011	R. L. Stine's The Haunting Hour: The Series	Marla; Margaret	"Scary Mary: Parts 1 & 2" "Scarecrow"
2012	How to Fall in Love	Claire Russell	TV film
2014	Happy Face Killer	Cora Jesperson	TV film
2014	Signed, Sealed, Delivered	Karyn	"Dark of Night"
2014	Heavenly Match	Marjorie Cline	TV film
2014	The Christmas Shepherd	Beth	TV film
2015	Watch Your Back	Louise Hampshire	TV film
2015	Motive	Bridget Vinton	"Pilot Error"
2017	Project Mc^{2}	Jenny Wallis	Recurring Role
