= Turbulence 2: Fear of Flying =

- DVD cover.
- Directed by: David MacKay
- Written by: Rob Kerchner
- Screenplay by: Brendan Broderick; Kevin Bernhardt
- Produced by: Mike Elliott; Darin Spillman
- Starring: Craig Sheffer; Jennifer Beals; Tom Berenger; Jeffrey Nordling
- Music by: Don Davis
- Production company: Trimark Pictures
- Distributed by: Lionsgate; (United States and select territories); Notorious Pictures; (Italy)
- Release date: December 27, 1999
- Running time: 101 minutes
- Country: United States
- Language: English

Turbulence 2: Fear of Flying (stylized as Turbulence II) is a 1999 American action thriller film directed by David MacKay and starring Craig Sheffer, Jennifer Beals and Tom Berenger. It is a sequel to the 1997 film Turbulence, released on direct-to-video.

== Plot ==
A group of people celebrate overcoming their fear of flying by taking a flight together. They board a TransContinental Airlines Boeing 747-200, TransCon Flight 110, circling Seattle–Tacoma International Airport. During the flight, a Czech terrorist hijacks the aircraft, claiming that a cargo-bay container holds a chemical weapon and displaying its detonator. He enters the cockpit and demands that the captain land at Seattle or a nearby airport. The captain refuses, citing bad weather, and suggests waiting for conditions to improve. After a struggle, British passenger Elliot, claiming to be an MI6 agent, and an FBI officer restrain the hijacker. Aerospace engineer Martin Messerman notices Elliot taking the detonator. When challenged, Elliot kills both the Czech hijacker and the FBI officer, declares himself in control, knocks out the captain and takes the passengers hostage. He disables the aircraft's airphones and incapacitates his assistant.

With help from passenger Jessica, Martin reaches the cargo bay and uses a VOR system to alert Seattle air traffic controller Robert Sikes. He learns that the aircraft will be shot down if it flies over a populated area and must drop the toxin over water within seven minutes. Sikes identifies the weapon as being in cargo box A45114, but Elliot cuts the transmission before Martin hears the complete number. Martin deploys the spoilers to descend to 10,000 ft (3,000 m), allowing the cargo door to be opened safely while giving him a cellphone signal. He retracts the spoilers, opens the door and locates the toxin in A45114. Elliot arrives and fires at Martin and Jessica, exhausting his ammunition. As ground controllers order the aircraft destroyed by a missile from the USS Bremerton, Elliot activates the detonator. Martin and Jessica nevertheless throw the toxin from the aircraft before it detonates over the water, then inform Seattle that it has been safely disposed of, prompting the missile strike to be aborted.

Elliot takes passenger Wilcox into the cockpit and discovers Martin and Jessica hiding in the crew compartment. Martin reveals that he is an aerospace engineer capable of landing the aircraft. Elliot allows him to take the controls but threatens to kill Jessica if he attempts anything. Martin broadcasts Elliot's demands: no police or armed personnel and further instructions to follow. Elliot orders a flyby over Sea-Tac Airport, but Martin objects because of the aircraft's low fuel. Elliot throws Wilcox from the aircraft, handcuffs Jessica to a seat and lands in the airport control tower, severely damaging the aircraft and leaving it as a warning if his demands are ignored.

Martin manages to land the aircraft using two engines. SWAT teams surround it as Elliot, accompanied by Martin, descends the airstair, claiming he is "already halfway home". Martin records his conversation with air traffic controllers and federal agents in the control tower, who hear it over a speaker. Meanwhile, Martin's son Trevor is in the terminal with one of Elliot's armed henchmen. Trevor runs onto the tarmac, pursued by the henchman, who is killed by SWAT officers. Elliot shoots and wounds a paramedic before Martin breaks Elliot's wrist-mounted spike and uses it to stab him, killing him instantly. Martin reunites with Trevor and Jessica, then meets Robert Sikes in person. The three leave together as the passengers disembark.

== Cast ==
- Craig Sheffer as Martin Messerman
- Jennifer Beals as Jessica
- Tom Berenger as Robert Sikes
- Jeffrey Nordling as Elliot
- Jay Brazeau as Harold
- Andrew Kavadas as Russ Bell
- Peter Wilds as Stanley Niles
- Avery Raskin as Bradford Wilcox
- Peter Kelamis as Mazzo
- Tim Henry as Dickson
- Howard Siegel as Blake
- Dillon Moen as Trevor
- Douglas Newell as Kessler
- Andrew McIlroy as Brewster
- Scott Owen as Lenny
- Tom Shorthouse as Ralph
- Jill Teed as Kit
- Jody Thompson as Stacey
- Katrina Matthews as Michelle
- Tamara Phillips as Hobbs
- Chilton Crane as Hazel
- Claire Riley as Peggy
- Donna Peerless as Mildred
- D. Neil Mark as Naval Officer
- Dean McKenzie as SWAT Team Leader
- Hiro Kanagawa as Controller
- Paul Jarrett as Vaclav
- Zinaid Memisevic as Jan
- Mike Dopud as Petr
- Vitaly Kravchenko as Josef
- Adrian Formosa as Henchman
- Daryl Shuttleworth as Captain Reynolds
- Simon Longmore as Co-Pilot
- Robin Avery as Navigator

== Reception ==
On review aggregator website Rotten Tomatoes, Turbulence 2: Fear of Flying holds an approval rating of 14% based on seven reviews, with an average rating of 2.7/10.
