= Twisted (TV series) =

2013 television series

- Genre: Teen drama; Mystery; Thriller
- Created by: Adam Milch
- Starring: Avan Jogia; Maddie Hasson; Kylie Bunbury; Ashton Moio; Kimberly Quinn; Denise Richards; Sam Robards
- Composer: Gabriel Mann
- Country of origin: United States
- Original language: English
- No. of seasons: 1
- No. of episodes: 19

Production
- Executive producers: John Ziffren; David Babcock; Adam Milch; Gavin Polone; Charles Pratt, Jr.; Nathan Folks
- Producers: Erin Maher; Anatoli Tadesse; Kathy Lindsberg; David Grace; David Hartle
- Cinematography: Teodoro Maniaci; Ted Hayash; Mark Doering-Powell
- Editors: Zeborah Tidwell; Courtney Carrillo; Chad Mochrie
- Running time: 40 minutes
- Production companies: Pariah Television; Basement Plays Entertainment

Original release
- Network: ABC Family
- Release: March 19, 2013 – April 1, 2014

Twisted (stylized as twiƨted) is an American teen drama mystery-thriller television series. The pilot episode aired on March 19, 2013, and the show's remaining 10 episodes resumed airing on June 18, 2013.

On July 30, 2013, Twisted was picked up for a full season of 19 episodes and the second half of season one started airing on February 11, 2014. The season finale aired on April 1, 2014.

On August 13, 2014, ABC Family announced that Twisted would not be renewed for a second season.

== Plot ==
The series focuses on charming sixteen-year-old Danny Desai (Avan Jogia) who confessed to killing his aunt when he was eleven. Having spent five years in juvenile detention, he is released and returns to his hometown of Green Grove, New York. While trying to rekindle old friendships and facing the challenges of dealing with his judgmental peers, a classmate is murdered and Danny becomes the prime suspect. Realizing the town does not care about the truth and only wants to see him charged with the crime, Danny becomes determined to clear his name. Meanwhile, he must maintain a secret he has never told anyone - the reason his aunt was murdered.

== Cast and characters ==
=== Main ===
- Avan Jogia as Danny Desai, a charming 16-year-old who has recently been released from juvie for the murder of his Aunt Tara. He instantly becomes a suspect to Regina's murder. He is first in love with Lacey but realizes his true feelings for Jo.
- Maddie Hasson as Jo Masterson, a smart girl who was traumatized by her childhood and became a social outcast. She is in love with Danny but realizes he will never think of her more than a friend. She dates Tyler briefly and loses her virginity with him to forget Danny. After Tyler, she starts dating Charlie going against how Danny feels about him but Charlie turns out to be a liar and had many secrets so they break up. Danny shortly after the break up tells Jo his feelings for her. When Jo needs time to "think about it" they have plans to meet at a library but she never makes it due to Charlie kidnapping her.
- Kylie Bunbury as Lacey Porter, an independent girl who worked hard to achieve her popular status in high school after Danny went away to juvie. Conscious of her status, she first avoids Jo and Danny for fear of losing her popularity. However, she soon befriends the two again. She is also Danny's girlfriend for a while until they break up later in the season.
- Ashton Moio as Rico Winter, Jo's hard working, intelligent and awkward guy friend who secretly has a crush on her. He finds that Jo does not return his feelings so he starts dating Andie.
- Denise Richards as Karen Desai, Danny's devoted mother, Vikram's wife and Jack's love interest.
- Kimberly Quinn as Tess Masterson, Jo's mother and Karen's friend.
- Sam Robards as Kyle Masterson, the town's Chief of Police and Jo's overprotective father. Kyle tries to protect Jo from Charlie and Danny when he can.

=== Recurring ===
- TJ Ramini as Vikram Desai, Danny's father and Karen's husband.
- Ivan Sergei as Jack Taylor, a boat mechanic and Vikram's old business partner. He's in love with Karen.
- Grey Damon as Archie Yates, Lacey's ex-boyfriend and Danny's nemesis.
- Brittany Curran as Phoebe Daly, an overly-dramatic and eccentric student and former enemy of Regina.
- Chris Zylka as Tyler Lewis, Phoebe's half-brother and a popular student interested in film production and in dating Jo. He was the mastermind behind multiple pranks against Danny.
- Jamila Velazquez as Sarita Sanchez, Lacey's former best friend and the popular 'mean girl'.
- John DeLuca as Cole Farrell, a soccer player who becomes Danny's friend.
- Todd Julian as Scott Ogden, Archie's best friend.
- Christopher Cousins as Mayor John Rollins
- Robin Givens as Judy, Lacey's mother.
- Jack Falahee as Charlie McBride, the new kid at Green Grove. He was Danny's cellmate in juvie, he appears to be romantically interested in Lacey, but then pursues Jo. He is the adoptive son of Tara Desai and is the biological son of Tess Masterson.
- Jessica Tuck as Gloria Crane, the mother of murdered student Regina.
- Daya Vaidya as Sandy Palmer, Kyle's very attractive deputy assistant.
- Aaron Hill as Eddie Garrett, a cop who works with Kyle.
- Rob Chen as Principal Mark Tang, the principal of the school. His readmission of Danny was a condition of a short affair he had with Karen.
- Ely Henry as Doug Mars, one of Rico's fellow "mathletes".
- Cynthy Wu as Andie Dang, a smart but shy girl in Green Grove High.
- Stacy Haiduk as Marilyn Rossi, a private investigator hired by Mayor Rollins to solve the Regina Crane murder case.
- Brianne Howey as Whitney Taylor, Jack's daughter who is very wild and free spirited.
- Keiko Agena as April Tanaka, a grief therapist brought in to help students deal with Regina's death.
- Kathy Najimy as Mrs. Fisk, a teacher at Green Grove High School.

== Development and production ==
The series was originally titled Socio, but was renamed during production in early 2013.

The show is partially filmed in the Hudson Valley Area. Some of the scenes are shot in the small village of Nyack, NY (35 miles North of Manhattan). Johnny Cakes, where many of the scenes take place, is a real diner located on Main Street in Nyack.

=== Casting ===
Maddie Hasson and Kylie Bunbury were cast as Jo and Lacey in September 2012. A month later, Avan Jogia, Denise Richards, Kimberly Quinn, Kathy Najimy and Grey Damon were announced to play Danny, Karen, Tess, Mrs. Fisk and Archie. The pilot was greenlighted in August 2012, and was filmed three months later in New York City in October. In February 2013, ABC Family ordered the show as a series. On April 3, 2013, production commenced in Studio City.

== Episodes ==
The 19-episode first season began with a sneak peek on March 19, 2013, before its official premiere on June 11, 2013, receiving 1.19 million viewers and 1.61 million viewers, respectively. The mid-season finale aired on August 27, 2013. The second half of the season aired from February 11, 2014, through April 1, 2014. A recap episode narrated by Ashton Moio titled "Socio Studies 101" aired on August 20, 2013, and gathered 0.99 million viewers.

No.	Title	Directed by	Written by	Original release date	U.S. viewers (millions)
1	"Pilot"	Jon Amiel	Adam Milch	March 19, 2013	1.19
Danny Desai, Jo Masterson, and Lacey Porter were all three best friends in childhood. At age 11, Danny murdered his Aunt Tara and was placed in a juvenile detention center. Five years later, Lacey is part of the popular crowd, while Jo is a social outcast; the two no longer friends. Newly released, Danny tries to reconnect with the girls. Jo warms up to him and they go to a party thrown by Regina, Lacey's best friend. Lacey also begins to warm up to Danny when they share a bag of chips in Danny's bedroom later in the evening. That night, Regina texts Danny that she knows why he killed his aunt. The next day, she is found murdered, the necklace from her neck the only thing missing. Danny becomes the prime suspect, and it is revealed that he has the necklace. Note: This episode aired again on June 11, 2013, and received 1.61m viewers.
2	"Grief is a Five Letter Word"	Gavin Polone	Adam Milch	June 18, 2013	1.80
Danny is determined to clear his name after the entire town turns against him. Danny and Jo decide to invite Tess to a dinner at the Desai's to show that Danny can be trusted. Jo, Rico and both Jo's parents arrive at the dinner. Kyle, convinced Danny is the killer, searches Danny's room but is caught by Danny. Jo's parents argue with Karen about Danny, ruining the dinner. Later, Danny burns all the photos of him and his aunt in a bonfire. He then picks up Regina's necklace--which used to belong to Aunt Tara--but is unable to destroy it.
3	"PSA de Resistance"	Joe Lazarov	Andy Reaser	June 25, 2013	1.36
Danny and Jo volunteer to take part in a skit play for Sobriety Awareness Day. Danny tries to get closer to Lacey and leading up to the skit, they share a number of intense glances. After their skit, Sarita humiliates Jo by showing an auto-tuned video about her in front of the whole school. Danny and Lacey talk and almost kiss. It is revealed that Archie had borrowed his friend's car the entire night of Regina's party, which nullified his original alibi that he was home.
4	"Sleeping with the Frenemy"	Joshua Butler	Kay Reindl & Erin Maher	July 2, 2013	1.06
Jo attends a sleepover at Lacey's in the hopes of finding out something about Regina and why she was murdered. Meanwhile, Danny joins the soccer team at his school, and is generally accepted by his teammates due to his skills, although Archie, the team captain, is cold toward him. Kyle obtains a search warrant for the Desai house and barges in, angering Karen. However, he does not find anything and leaves. Karen is shocked when she finds Regina's necklace, cleverly hidden by Danny in Vikram's favorite chair.
5	"The Fest and the Furious"	Daisy Mayer	Debra J. Fisher	July 9, 2013	1.61
Tension arises among the town residents over whether Danny should attend the annual Fall Festival. Jo convinces Danny to go together, and later realizes she likes Danny, which creates tension between her and Rico, who likes Jo. Meanwhile, Lacey finds a letter sent to Regina, which contains money and says that the money should keep Regina's mouth shut. Lacey gets Danny alone and shows him the letter, then gives in to her conflicted emotions and kisses him, which he reciprocates. Danny and Lacey then meet Jo and show her the letter. Trying to protect Danny, Karen tosses Regina's necklace into the lake.
6	"Three for the Road"	Joe Lazarov	David Babcock	July 16, 2013	1.58
Danny, Jo and Lacey drive to the return address on the letter to find out who lives there. After a huge argument between Jo and Lacey, the two apologize to each other for breaking their friendship. Tess inadvertently reveals to Karen that Vikram cheated on Karen with her several times when he and Karen were dating. The girls discover that the man who lived in the apartment was Danny's father, and can not figure out what Regina had to do with him. They leave with Danny, unable to tell him what they found out. Rico reveals to Kyle that he saw Karen throw something into the lake.
7	"We Need to Talk About Danny"	Chris Grismer	Brian Studler	July 23, 2013	1.48
When Karen fails a job interview, Kyle attempts to win her trust. Lacey and Jo want answers from Danny about his secrets, but end up revealing that they found out the apartment belonged to Danny's father. Jo realizes that she may be in love with Danny. After Danny reveals his vulnerable side, Lacey and Danny share another heated kiss, which Lacey promptly stops when she realizes they are making out in front of Tara's grave; she leaves to break up with Archie. Meanwhile, Kyle's partner reveals that they found the necklace.
8	"Docu-Trauma"	Roger Kumble	Andy Reaser & Phinneas Kiyomura	July 30, 2013	1.32
Danny throws a party and Tyler agrees to help if he can film it for a documentary, while Kyle confronts Karen about the recovered necklace that she threw into the river.
9	"The Truth Will Out"	Joe Lazarov	Erin Maher & Kay Reindl	August 6, 2013	1.50
Picking up where the previous episode left off, Kyle Masterson is seen questioning Danny's mother after her confession to murdering Regina. With this major development in the murder investigation, Danny is likely to move away from Green Grove for good. Danny then decides to provide Kyle with all the information they have concerning the murder in order to clear both him and his mother's names. Lacey's aloof and disapproving father, Samuel, arrives in town for Lacey's sister Clara's birthday party. With Rico's advice to try harder with Lacey, Jo offers to attend the birthday party for moral support. She then discovers Lacey's father and Mitch (Clara's gymnastic coach) kissing in the pantry. Meanwhile, Danny is keeping his own secret from his best friends and decides it may be time to come clean about how Karen got the necklace. The episode ends with Rico receiving a shocking video of Danny and Lacey that has the potential to destroy friendships and reputations.
10	"Poison of Interest"	Gavin Polone	David Babcock	August 13, 2013	1.44
Accusations against Danny could get him kicked out of school, and Jo is upset when a video is released.
11	"Out with the In-Crowd"	Joe Lazarov	Debra J. Fisher	August 27, 2013	1.62
Jo is still hurt over the video, and Lacey has become an outcast at school.
12	"Dead Men Tell Big Tales"	Gavin Polone	Charles Pratt, Jr.	February 11, 2014	1.29
Danny overhears his mom and Chief Masterson talking about Danny's father being alive. Danny remains on the run from the police. Rico attempts to be comforting towards Lacey. Danny tries to tell Jo about the news of his father but she rats him out and he runs again. Karen is pissed and takes her anger out on the Mastersons. Rico lets Danny stay with him for a while. Jo confesses to Tess that she regrets sleeping with Tyler. Danny comes clean to Jo and Lacey about his aunt's murder: his father killed her and coerced Danny into taking the blame. Vikram returns, leading to a confrontation with Danny. As the confrontation gets physical, Vikram assaults both Danny and Jo but falls off the edge of a cliff when Danny tries to defend himself and Jo.
13	"Sins of the Father"	Gavin Polone	Adam Milch	February 18, 2014	1.37
Finally in the clear over Regina's murder, Danny wonders if he deserves a second chance, while Karen has doubts about reconnecting with Jack. Elsewhere, Lacey thinks there's a link between Gloria and Vikram; Charlie takes an interest in Lacey; and the mayor is connected to something surprising
14	"Home Is Where the Hurt Is"	David Jackson	Stacy Rukeyser	February 25, 2014	1.12
Things get tense for Danny and Lacey as the homecoming dance looms. Meanwhile, Jo tries to help Andie and Rico get together. Danny recognizes someone who's linked to his past in juvenile hall. Also, Tess struggles to keep secrets from Kyle
15	"Danny Indemnity"	Chad Lowe	Andy Reaser	March 4, 2014	1.10
Danny and Jo are puzzled by a huge cover-up. Meanwhile, Danny acquires a large sum of money, putting a strain on his relationship with his mom. Jo asks her mother about the distance between her parents. Also, Tess reveals something new to Kyle.
16	"The Son Also Falls"	Teri Hatcher	Ariana Jackson	March 11, 2014	1.02
Kyle begins to dig into Karen's motives. Jo and Andie compete for student body president. Lacey strikes up a friendship with Whitney, Jack's daughter.
17	"You're a Good Man, Charlie McBride"	Daisy Mayer	Adam Milch	March 18, 2014	1.13
Charlie's growing relationship with Jo concerns Danny. Meanwhile, Lacey takes a liking to Whitney's wild side. Karen gives Danny positive advice and helps Tess with a personal problem. Also, Kyle has suspicions about Jack.
18	"Danny, Interrupted"	Gavin Polone	Stacy Rukeyser	March 25, 2014	0.73
Danny visits an old confidant; Jo questions a friend's motives; Tess receives bad news.
19	"A Tale of Two Confessions"	Gavin Polone	Charles Pratt, Jr.	April 1, 2014	0.77
Kyle's investigation culminates with a series of shocking and contradictory confessions and potentially deadly consequences. The complicated triangle between Jo, Danny and Charlie comes to a shocking head. Karen and Tess uncover more of Vikram's secrets, including a piece of evidence that has major implications for Tess and the Masterson family. Meanwhile, Whitney's mother Gretchen (Elaine Hendrix) shows up to bring her daughter back to the city, and her candor about Whitney's past causes Lacey to question her friend. And Rico makes a major faux pas in his first meeting with Andie's parents. It's revealed that Charlie is Tara's adoptive son and Tess's biological son. Gunshots are then fired.

== Broadcast ==
Country	TV network(s)
Australia	Fox8
Arab world	OSN First HD
Bangladesh	Zee Café
Brazil	Sony Entertainment Television; Rede Globo
Canada	ABC Spark
Cuba	MultiVisión
Turkey	Dizimax Entertainment
France	June
Denmark	Kanal 4
Malaysia	8TV
Germany	RTL II
New Zealand	TV2
Greece; Cyprus	FOX Life
Israel	Yes Drama
United States	ABC Family
Lithuania	Sony Entertainment Television
Russia	Sony Entertainment Television
Poland	FOX Life
India	Zee Café

== Reception ==
=== Critical reception ===
On the review aggregator website Rotten Tomatoes, the first season holds an approval rating of 73% based on 11 reviews, with an average rating of 6.80/10. The site's critics consensus reads, "Twisted might offer below-average dialogue in terms of moody teen faire, but a compelling cast makes the grade." On Metacritic, the first season of the show holds a score 66 out of 100 based on reviews from 7 critics, indicating "generally favorable reviews".

=== Accolades ===
Year	Award	Category	Nominee(s)	Result	Ref.
2013	Teen Choice Awards	Choice Summer TV Star: Male	Avan Jogia	Nominated	
2013	Teen Choice Awards	Choice Summer TV Star: Female	Maddie Hasson	Nominated	
2014	Teen Choice Awards	Choice TV Show: Drama	Twisted	Nominated	
2014	Teen Choice Awards	Choice TV Actor: Drama	Avan Jogia	Nominated	
2014	Teen Choice Awards	Choice TV Actress: Drama	Maddie Hasson	Nominated	
