= Maddie Hasson =

American actress

- Born: 1994 or 1995 (age 31–32); New Bern, North Carolina, U.S.
- Occupation: Actress
- Years active: 2011–present
- Spouse: Julian Brink (m. 2015)

Maddie Hasson (born 1994 or 1995) is an American actress. She is known for her role as Willa Monday on Fox's television series The Finder. She also co-starred in the ABC Family series Twisted. She starred in the YouTube Premium series Impulse as Henrietta "Henry" Coles and the Netflix spy series The Recruit as Nichka Lashin.

== Early life ==
Hasson was born in New Bern, North Carolina, the daughter of Catherine and Michael. Hasson grew up in Wilmington, where she attended Cape Fear Academy. She was a competitive dancer in Wilmington's Fox Troupe Dancers for eight years. As a child and young teen, Hasson performed in a variety of stage productions, including Grey Gardens and The Best Little Whorehouse in Texas.

== Career ==
Hasson's first callback was for the CW's The Secret Circle. She was not cast, however, and went on to win the role of Willa Monday in Fox's The Finder. In 2012, Hasson traveled to Canton, Ohio, to film Underdogs. Hasson co-starred in ABC Family's Twisted as Jo Masterson. In 2015, she appeared as Billie Jean, the second wife and widow of Hank Williams, in the Williams biopic I Saw the Light. That same year she also starred in the indie feature "Good After Bad". In 2016, she starred in the indie feature Novitiate. Beginning in 2018, she starred in YouTube's series Impulse as Henrietta "Henry" Coles.

== Personal life ==
Hasson relocated to Los Angeles, California, with her mother for her job, and finished high school through online coursework. She lives in Los Angeles.

She came out as bisexual in January 2021. Hasson has been married to Julian Brink since 2015.

== Filmography ==
=== Film ===
Year	Title	Role	Notes
2011	God Bless America	Chloe	
2013	Underdogs	Renee Donohue	
2015	I Saw the Light	Billie Jean	
2015	A Light Beneath Their Feet	Daschulla	
2017	Good After Bad	Shelly	Also performer
2017	Ape	Blonde	Short film
2017	Novitiate	Sister Sissy	
2019	We Summon the Darkness	Valerie	
2021	Malignant	Sydney Lake	
2022	Taurus	Llanna	
2024	Elevation	Katie	
2024	Bone Lake	Sage	
2025	Violence		
TBA	America's Favorite †		Post-production

=== Television ===
Year	Title	Role	Notes
2012	The Finder	Willa Monday	Main cast
2012	Grimm	Carly Kampfer	Episode: "Bad Moon Rising"
2013–2014	Twisted	Jo Masterson	Main cast
2017, 2019	Mr. Mercedes	Allie	4 episodes
2018–2019	Impulse	Henrietta "Henry" Coles	Main cast
2022–2025	The Recruit	Nichka Lashin/Marta	Guest (season 1), main cast (season 2)

== Awards and nominations ==
Year	Award	Category	Work	Result
2013	Teen Choice Awards	Choice Summer TV Star: Female	Twisted	Nominated
2014	Teen Choice Awards	Choice TV Actress: Drama	Twisted	Nominated
2025	Blood in the Snow Film Festival ("Bloodies")	Best Supporting Acting Performance in a Feature Film	Violence	Won
