= Sedina Fiati =

Canadian actress and theatre director

Sedina Fiati is a Canadian actress and theatre director. She is most noted for her role as Ese in the web series Tokens, for which she won the Canadian Screen Award for Best Supporting Performance in a Web Program or Series at the 11th Canadian Screen Awards in 2023.

A native of Toronto, Ontario, and a graduate of the theatre program at the University of Windsor, Fiati coordinated the Feminist Fuck It theatre festival in 2018, and made her stage directing debut as director of Andrea Scott and Nick Green's Every Day She Rose for Nightwood Theatre in 2019. She was named Nightwood's artist-in-residence in 2021.

As an actress her noted credits have included stage productions in productions of Shirley Barrie's Queen Marie and Rick Chafe's adaptation of Homer's Odyssey, and guest roles in the television series The Listener, Coroner and Murdoch Mysteries.
