= Tokens (web series) =

Canadian comedy web series

- Also known as: Tokens On Call
- Genre: Comedy
- Created by: Winnifred Jong.; Co-created by Trinni Franke
- Written by: Winnifred Jong; Trinni Franke; Vincent Lui; Carolyn Saunders; Lakna Edilima; Catherine Legge
- Directed by: Winnifred Jong
- Starring: Connie Wang; Ryan Allen; Shelley Thompson
- Composer: Chris Reineck
- Country of origin: Canada
- No. of seasons: 2
- No. of episodes: 16

Production
- Producers: Trinni Franke; Winnifred Jong
- Cinematography: Lainie Knox
- Editors: Ben Lawrence; Gloria Tong
- Running time: 5-8 minutes

Original release
- Release: May 6, 2019

Tokens is a Canadian comedy web series created by Winnifred Jong and produced along with Trinni Franke. The series premiered on Facebook and YouTube on May 6, 2019. It also stayed on Binge Networks for the first season and was later sold to Urbanflix TV.

Tokens follows the lives of the actors of an "on call" casting agency who are dispatched to productions in order to fulfill diversity quotas. The series stars Connie Wang, Ryan Allen and Shelley Thompson. As of October 2019, Tokens has amassed more than 500,000 combined views across Facebook and YouTube.

Season 2 of Tokens was financed in 2020 but due to the outbreak of Covid, it was not able to go to camera until the fall of 2021. After filming and post were completed, it launched on The Roku Channel in January 2023.

== Plot ==
The series follows the actors of On Call Casting, a fictional agency designed to help busy production companies meet their mandated diversity quotas. Dispatcher Betty sends out whoever is on call, with the actors often finding themselves cast in the roles they least expect.

== Cast and characters ==
=== Main ===
- Connie Wang as Sammie Pang, an aspiring actress who joins On Call Casting in the hopes that she will find acting work beyond stereotypical token roles, despite the growing disapproval of her traditional parents.
- Ryan Allen as DeMar Lowry, a stunt coordinator-turned-actor who befriends Sammie after joining On Call Casting.
- Shelley Thompson as Betty, the eccentric, entrepreneurial dispatcher of On Call Casting.

=== Recurring ===
- Jessica Greco as Jessica AD
- Daniel Maslany as Dennis AD
- Chelsea Clark as Roxy
- Krystal Kiran as Priya
- Christina Song as Vivian, Sammie's Mom
- Russell Yuen as Bob, Sammie's Dad
- Jonathan Cherry as Director #1
- Sharron Matthews as Director #2
- Amy Matysio as the Producer
- Ted Stokes as the Cinematographer
- Samora Smallwood as Jenn the Costumer
- Sedina Fiati as Ese the Makeup Artist
- Tyssen Smith as the College Brat

=== Guest ===
- Fuad Ahmed (credited as Gabe Grey) as Vasant
- Andrew James McMichael as the Production Assistant
- Abigail Nadeau as the Bored Ballet Dancer
- Ehren Kassam as Kruger the Driver
- Ella Jonas Farlinger as Teen Betty
- Stephanie Morgenstern as the Casting Assistant
- Leigh Cameron as Captain Anjelika
- Sergey Volkov as Traktor
- Tom Melissis as Director #3
- Julia Huang as Sammie's Niece
- Daniela Saioni as Director #4
- Jeananne Goossen as Casting Director Voice

== Episodes ==
=== Season 1 (2019) ===
No. overall	No. in season	Title	Original release date	Length
1	1	"Courage"	May 6, 2019	5:13
2	2	"Your Inner Bruce Lee"	May 6, 2019	5:44
3	3	"Finding Cinderella"	May 6, 2019	5:46
4	4	"Include the Kitchen Sink"	May 6, 2019	5:11
5	5	"Put Your Best Head Forward"	May 6, 2019	7:19
6	6	"Whitewashing"	May 6, 2019	7:51
7	7	"Dreams Start Somewhere"	May 6, 2019	6:46
8	8	"This. Is. Real"	May 6, 2019	6:53

=== Season 2 (2023) ===
No. overall	No. in season	Title	Original release date	Length
11	1	"The Phoenix"	January 10, 2023	6:39
12	2	"The Sensitivity"	January 10, 2023	7:31
13	3	"The Mixer"	January 10, 2023	8:00
14	4	"The Fight Club"	January 10, 2023	7:52
15	5	"The Balls"	January 10, 2023	9:27
16	6	"The Fallout"	January 10, 2023	7:25
17	7	"The Show Must Go On"	January 10, 2023	7:04
18	8	"The Goal"	January 10, 2023	10:09

== Production ==
The first season of Tokens was funded through the Telefilm Talent-To-Watch program and the Bell Fund. The series received additional funding through sponsorships from William F. White International and Grandé Camera (formerly Dazmo Camera).

Principal photography took place in November 2018 in Toronto.

In February 2019, Tokens creator Winnifred Jong and producer Trinni Franke participated in the Prime Time Throwdown pitch competition at the 2019 Prime Time in Ottawa conference, where they were awarded in-kind marketing services to support the release of the first season. The series premiered to a sold-out audience at the TIFF Bell Lightbox on May 6, 2019, the same day the first season was released worldwide on Facebook and YouTube.

== Reception ==
Tokens has received praise for its satirical depiction of the issues of tokenism and representation in the entertainment industry. Critics have noted the cultural relevance of the show's themes, with Greg David of TV, Eh? writing "Tokens couldn’t be more timely. Or scathingly on point." In a Calgary Herald review, Melissa Hank remarked that the series "tackles Hollywood diversity with grace and humour." Spring Marie Cullen of Starry Constellation Magazine wrote "it's smart, it's funny and it takes a unique look at the entertainment industry," concluding that "anyone who considers themselves a dreamer, no matter what career avenue they're headed down, will find enjoyment in this series." Writing for The TV Junkies, Bridget Liszewski described Tokens as "a funny, bold, tongue-in-cheek look at issues of diversity, inclusion, and representation."

As of July 2020, the first season of Tokens has been selected to screen at T.O. WebFest, Minnesota WebFest, NYC Web Fest, Bilbao Seriesland, NZ Web Fest, the Asia Web Awards, Santa Monica Webfest, Bogotá Web Fest, Apulia Web Fest, Miami Web Fest, Copenhagen Web Fest, New Jersey Web Fest, Santa Monica Webfest, DC Web Fest, Seoul Webfest, and Oakville Film Festival.

It boldly became the first short form series to be nominated as Best Ensemble at the 2020 ACTRA Awards, competing with Kim's Convenience, Baroness von Sketch, Anne with an E and the eventual winner, Schitt's Creek. It was nominated for four Canadian Screen Awards in 2020, where Winnifred Jong won for Best Direction, Web Program or Series.

=== Awards and nominations ===
Season 1
Year	Festival	Award Category	Result
2019	T.O. WebFest	Diversity Story Spotlight	Nominated
2019	Minnesota WebFest	Best Comedy Series	Won
2019	Minnesota WebFest	Best Representation of Communities of Color	Won
2019	NYC Web Fest	Best Comedy	Nominated
2019	NYC Web Fest	Best Supporting Actress (for Shelley Thompson)	Nominated
2019	Bilbao Seriesland	Starlet Amets (for Connie Wang)	Nominated
2019	NZ Web Fest	Best Ensemble (International Narrative)	Nominated
2019	NZ Web Fest	Best Director (International Narrative)	Nominated
2019	Asia Web Awards	Best Actress in a Comedy (for Connie Wang)	Nominated
2019	Asia Web Awards	Best Creator in a Comedy	Nominated
2019	Asia Web Awards	Best Director in a Comedy	Won
2019	Asia Web Awards	Best Editing (for Ben Lawrence & Gloria Tong)	Nominated
2019	Asia Web Awards	Best Ensemble Cast in a Comedy	Nominated
2019	Asia Web Awards	Best Screenplay in a Comedy	Nominated
2019	Asia Web Awards	Best Web Series	Nominated
2020	ACTRA Toronto Awards	Outstanding Performance – Female (for Jessica Greco)	Nominated
2020	ACTRA Toronto Awards	Members' Choice Series Ensemble	Nominated
2020	Women's Comedy Film Festival in Atlanta	Best Web Series	Won
2020	Canadian Screen Awards	Best Writing, Web Program or Series (for Winnifred Jong)	Nominated
2020	Canadian Screen Awards	Best Direction, Web Program or Series (for Winnifred Jong)	Won
2020	Canadian Screen Awards	Best Lead Performance, Web Program or Series (for Connie Wang)	Nominated
2020	Canadian Screen Awards	Best Supporting Performance, Web Program or Series (for Jessica Greco)	Nominated
2020	Apulia Web Fest	Best Actress (for Connie Wang)	Won
2020	DC Web Fest	Bronze Award	Won
2020	Seoul Webfest	Best Web Series	Nominated
2020	Canadian Cinema Editors Awards	Best Editing in Webseries (for Ben Lawrence for Episode 3)	Nominated
