= Bloody Knuckles (film) =

- Theatrical release poster
- Directed by: Matt O'Mahoney
- Screenplay by: Matt O'Mahoney
- Produced by: Matt O'Mahoney; Daniel Domachowski; Christena Zatylny
- Starring: Adam Boys; Kasey Ryne Mazak
- Cinematography: Scooter Corkle
- Edited by: Scott Belyea; Matt O'Mahoney
- Music by: Eugenio Battaglia; Oscar Vargas
- Distributed by: Artsploitation Films
- Release date: October 18, 2014
- Running time: 85 minutes
- Country: Canada
- Language: English

Bloody Knuckles is a 2014 Canadian comedy horror film, the first feature film directed by Matt O'Mahoney. It stars Adam Boys and Kasey Ryne Mazak and received its World Premiere at the 2014 Fantasia International Film Festival.

== Premise ==
Travis is an underground comics artist one of whose works depicts Chinatown boss Leonard Fong as a gangster responsible for a teenager's death by rat poison. Fong cuts off Travis's drawing hand, which rises from the sewer to take revenge and also beats up its former owner. A subplot involves Homo Dynamous, a gay man wearing leather bondage gear who comes to life from Travis' comic to assist him and his hand.

== Cast ==
- Adam Boys as Travis
- Kasey Ryne Mazak as Leonard Fong
- Ken Tsui as Ralphie
- Gabrielle Giraud as Amy
- Dwayne Bryshun as Homo Dynamous
- Steve Thackray as Detective Frank
- Tim Lok as Shrimp
- Jason Asuncion as Brutus
- Kent S. Leung as Static
- Robin Jung as Maggot
- Krista Magnusson as Hand
- Peter Breeze as Kyle
- Marlie Collins as Laurie

== Production ==
The film was shot in Vancouver, and was originally titled Sick Puppy. It was O'Mahoney's feature film directing debut.

== Accolades ==
Year	Festival	Award	Recipient(s)	Result	Ref.
2014	Blood in the Snow Canadian Film Festival	Best Screenplay	Matt O'Mahoney	Won	
2014	Blood in the Snow Canadian Film Festival	Best Picture	Matt O'Mahoney / Daniel Domachowski / Christena Zatylny	Won	
2014	Blood in the Snow Canadian Film Festival	Best Special Effects	Matthew Aebig	Won	
2014	Vancouver International Film Festival	Best BC Film	Matt O'Mahoney	Nominated	
2014	Vancouver International Film Festival	Best Emerging BC Filmmaker	Matt O'Mahoney	Nominated	
2015	Leo Awards	Best Make-Up in a Feature Length Drama	Matthew Aebig / Sara Huggins	Nominated	
2015	Leo Awards	Best Make-Up in a Motion Picture	Matthew Aebig / Sara Huggins	Nominated	
