= Connie Wang (actress) =

Canadian actress and comedian

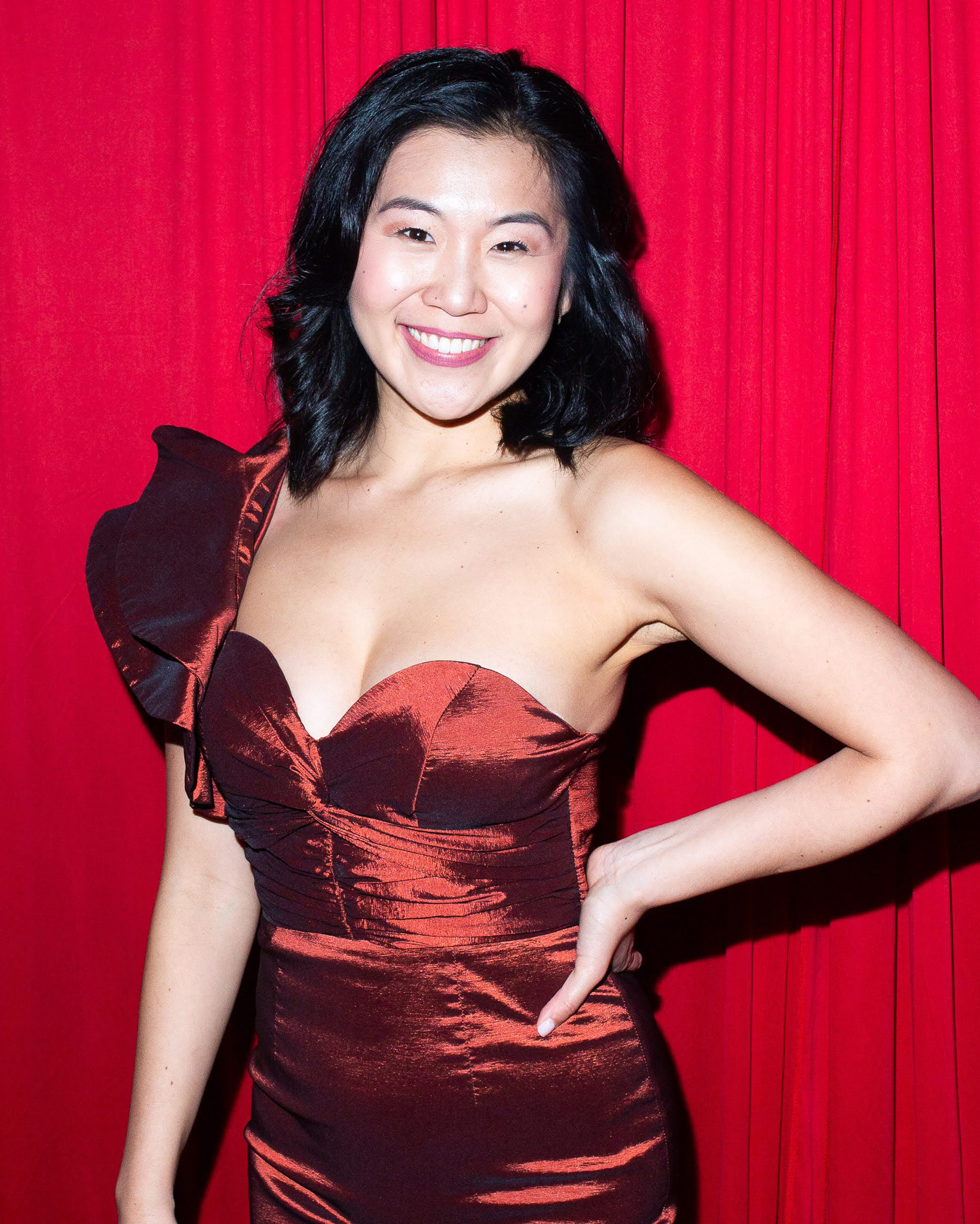
Connie Wang

Connie Wang is a Canadian actress and comedian from Windsor, Ontario, most noted for her leading role in the comedy web series Tokens.

In 2024, following a reduction in work during the 2023 Writers Guild of America strike, she self-released her comedy special Canadian Famous to YouTube.

== Awards ==
Award	Date of ceremony	Category	Work	Result	Ref.
Canadian Screen Awards	2020	Best Lead Performance in a Web Program or Series	Tokens	Nominated	
Canadian Screen Awards	2023	Best Lead Performance in a Web Program or Series	Tokens	Nominated	
Canadian Screen Awards	2025	Best Lead Performance in a Web Program or Series	Canadian Famous	Nominated	
Canadian Screen Awards	2025	Best Performance in a Guest Role in a Comedy Series	One More Time	Nominated	
