= White Raven (2015 film) =

White Raven is a 2015 Canadian survivalist horror film directed by Andrew Moxham. The movie takes its title from a native American legend about a white raven stealing light and giving it to the world. White Raven stars Steve Bradley (She Who Must Burn) and Aaron Brooks (Alien Trespass).

It had its world premiere November 29, 2015 as part of Toronto's Blood in the Snow Festival. Production company White Buffalo Films, is also behind the critically acclaimed horror-thriller She Who Must Burn.

== Plot ==
Four men head into the remote BC wilderness on an annual camping trip. When one of them starts to mentally break down, the others have to fight for their lives.

== Reception ==
Writer/director Andrew Moxham received a screenwriting award nomination at the 2016 Leo Awards, a program for the British Columbia film and television industry held every summer in Vancouver, British Columbia. The Film Corner said in its 4-star review, "The movie always feels like its taking you to places you have been before - not in the movies, but in life..." In their 4-star review, Really Awful Movies said, "Like the very best survivalist movies (Deliverance, The Hills Have Eyes, Southern Comfort, and others) Mother Nature provides a great external boundary and is just as much a star here.."
