= Black Mountain Side (film) =

2014 Canadian film by Nick Szostakiwskyj

- Black Mountain Side
- Directed by: Nick Szostakiwskyj
- Written by: Nick Szostakiwskyj
- Screenplay by: Nick Szostakiwskyj
- Produced by: Cameron Tremblay; Nick Szostakiwskyj
- Starring: Shane Twerdun; Michael Dickson; Carl Toftfelt; Marc Anthony Williams; Andrew Moxham; Timothy Lyle; Steve Bradley
- Cinematography: Cameron Tremblay
- Edited by: James Barrett
- Production company: A Farewell to Kings Entertainment Company
- Distributed by: Raven Banner Releasing (Canada); Monarch Home Video (United States)
- Release dates: July 30, 2014 (Fantasia International Film Festival); February 26, 2016 (Canada)
- Running time: 99 minutes
- Country: Canada
- Language: English

Black Mountain Side is a 2014 Canadian psychological horror film written and directed by Nick Szostakiwskyj and starring Shane Twerdun, Michael Dickson, Carl Toftfelt, Marc Anthony Williams, Andrew Moxham, Timothy Lyle, and Steve Bradley. The story centers upon a group of archaeologists who discover an improbable ancient structure in northern Canada and accidentally unleash something ancient and malicious.

The film premiered at the Fantasia International Film Festival on July 30, 2014, before being widely released on February 26, 2016 by Raven Banner. It received positive reviews from critics.

== Plot ==
Up in the northern Taiga Cordillera, a group of archaeologists uncover an ancient structure. Carbon dating places the structure and its associated artifacts to 20000 BCE, older than any previously known civilization. Professor Piers Olson arrives to write a report on the excavation site to secure funding from the SAA. Working with project director Francis Månro, Olson notes the artifacts seem Mesoamerican in nature, despite being separated by 4000 miles.

Strange occurrences begin to occur. One morning, a worker claims they witnessed equipment technician Drew McNaughton slaughter site chef Ramis’ cat, which he denies. Late that night, the entire Tłı̨chǫ workforce mysteriously abandons the site on foot in freezing weather. Månro’s assistant Steven Wells develops a fever and vomits up an unknown black substance. Outpost leader Jensen attempts to radio for help but is unable to make contact, despite the equipment working as normal. A few nights later, the group are forced to amputate Wells’ arm after strange tumors begin pulsating under his skin. Jensen later finds McNaughton has severed his own hand. He is sedated but commits suicide a few days later.

Olson deduces that the ancient civilization was possibly eradicated by an unknown disease, which the group may have inadvertently infected themselves with when they unearthed the ruins. The artifacts also point to the worship of a deer-like god. Dr. Richard Andervs, the site doctor, runs tests on the tumors on Wells’ arm and discovers they resemble the cells of a cephalopod.

Månro begins seeing visions of the deer god calling out to him, who convinces him to murder Wells. Månro is locked away in his room, and Jensen and Olson begin secretly planning to abandon the camp. Field supervisor Robert Michael Giles goes crazy and kills Månro, Ramis, and Andervs with a gun. Jensen shoots and kills Giles but sustains a bullet wound in the firefight. He sends Olson out to locate the nearest reservation for help while he rigs the site to explode.

The deer god speaks to the two men, claiming that it created space and time itself, and that humans are too insignificant to deserve knowing the truths they seek. Jensen defiantly blows himself up alongside the camp. Olson continues towards the reservation into the following day but gets his leg caught in a bear trap, his fate left unknown.

== Cast ==
- Shane Twerdun as Jensen
- Michael Dickson as Professor Piers Olsen
- Carl Toftfelt as Francis Månro
- Marc Anthony Williams as Robert Michael Giles
- Andrew Moxham as Dr. Richard Andervs
- Timothy Lyle as Drew McNaughton
- Steve Bradley as Steven Wells
- Nathaniel Gordon as Creature
- Bryce McLaughlin as Ramis
- Kelvin Bonneau as Navaron
- Cameron Tremblay as Station 9

== Release ==
Black Mountain Side premiered July 30, 2014, at the Fantasia International Film Festival, where it was named Best Horror Film by critics at Cult Montreal, who stated: "Its tension and sense of isolation were unparalleled this year; it is also reminiscent of The Thing and Lovecraft's At the Mountains of Madness. It squarely plants itself in the increasingly popular genre of Canadian horror films addressing the implications of global warming and the subsequent Arctic thaw. The other honourable mentions are Eli Roth's The Green Inferno, and Mark Duplass's Creep."

== Reception ==
Critical reception to Black Mountain Side was generally positive, with a Rotten Tomatoes approval rating of 80% based on five reviews.

Bloody Disgusting praised the film, and IndieWire called it "a solid addition to the movie tradition of arctic thrillers". Ain't It Cool News also praised the movie, writing "Black Mountain Side is expertly made and gorgeous to look at." Film School Rejects reviewed the movie positively, stating that "Black Mountain Side is a beautifully-shot, creepy love letter to John Carpenter's The Thing that finds its own identity amid the paranoia and bloodletting."

=== Awards ===
- Best Feature at the HP Lovecraft Film Festival (2015, won)
- Best Screenplay at the HP Lovecraft Film Festival (2013, won)
- Best Cinematography at the Blood in the Snow Canadian Film Festival (2015, won)
- Best Cinematography at the Leo Awards (2015, Nominated)
- Best Sound Editing at the Leo Awards (2015, Nominated)
