= Violence (2025 film) =

2025 Canadian film

- Directed by: Connor Marsden
- Written by: Connor Marsden; Devin Myler; William Woods
- Produced by: Julian Geneen; William Woods; Albert Shin; Maddy Falle
- Starring: Rohan Campbell; Maddie Hasson
- Cinematography: Vincent Biron
- Music by: Jami Morgan; Eric Balderose
- Production companies: Woods Entertainment; Grand Touring Productions; Obvious Allegory; TimeLapse Pictures; Ursa Major Productions
- Release date: September 19, 2025 (Cinéfest)
- Running time: 84 minutes
- Country: Canada
- Language: English

Violence is a 2025 Canadian action-thriller film directed by Connor Marsden and slated for release in 2025. The film stars Rohan Campbell as Henry Violence, a punk rocker who becomes embroiled in a brutal drug war between rival cartels.

The cast also includes Maddie Hasson, Greg Bryk, Sarah Grey, Tomaso Sanelli, Jasmin Kar, Eva Link, John Thomas Gauthier, Gregory Ambrose Calderone, Chad Camilleri, and Asher Rose in supporting roles.

The film was shot in Sudbury, Ontario, in spring 2024.

Violence had its world premiere at the 2025 Brooklyn Horror Film Festival.
