= Discopath =

- Directed by: Renaud Gauthier
- Written by: Renaud Gauthier
- Produced by: Marie-Claire Lalonde
- Starring: Jeremie Earp; Sandrine Bisson; Ivan Freud; Francois Aubin; Ingrid Falaise
- Cinematography: John Londono
- Edited by: Arthur Villers
- Music by: Bruce Cameron
- Production company: Durango Pictures
- Release date: August 3, 2013 (Montreal)
- Running time: 75 minutes
- Country: Canada
- Languages: French; English

Discopath (French: Discopathe) is a 2013 Canadian slasher film directed by Renaud Gauthier. The film is about Duane Lewis, a New York cook who becomes insane when hearing disco music. After murdering a woman in a club, Duane travels to Montreal where he continues his killing spree. Discopath premiered in Canada at the Fantasia Film Festival.

== Plot and synopsis ==
In the New York City, 1976. Duane Lewis is a cook at a hamburger joint. Whenever he hears disco music, he literally goes into a trance. The day he loses his job, he comes across a young roller-skater in the park who, hoping to console him, invites him to a night out at the discotheque Seventh Heaven. Bombarded by decibels, Duane’s trance state quickly degenerates into homicidal mania. The girl who brought him there soon enough bitterly regrets her invitation... Upon waking up the next morning, Duane hops on the first plane to Montreal, using a stolen passport. Four years later, he’s altered his identity. He now answers to the name of Martin, and works as an audio-visual tech at a private school for teenage girls. He wears special gear to cut out external sounds, and his employers imagine him to be hard of hearing. As a long weekend approaches, two of the school’s students elect to hide out there so they can spend the weekend in the building alone. Alone with Duane. Their secret disco party has horrible consequences as Duane’s murderous madness reaches its peak level and he now has several potential victims in his sights. Meanwhile, a lieutenant detective from New York believes he has figured out the serial killer’s modus operandi and he links up with the Montreal police force to track down the murderer.

== Production ==
Discopath is the debut feature film from Renaud Gauthier.

== Release ==
The film had its world premiere at the Fantasia Film Festival in Montreal on August 3, 2013. Discopath has its American premiere at the October 12, 2013 at the American Cinematheque, where it was shown with Pieces and Prom Night.

== Reception ==
Screen Daily referred to the Discopath as "an enjoyable oddball genre blending, fun while it lasts but ultimately too niche to make much of an impact, unless with horror fans." The Hollywood Reporter stated, "Semi-campy slasher pic is for genre fetishists only," and, "It's hard not to feel that Gauthier cares more about mimicking the style of giallo's greatest hits than about telling a story." Indiewire gave the film a D− rating, citing poor quality dubbing and production values as well as stating, "This is the type of movie that used to be made all the time, by quick-change artists capitalizing on a couple of random trends. But at least there was a genuine sleaze element at work, and the idea that there was a genuine approach and vision that emerged from a generic incompetence with cameras, framing and effects. Now, it’s just an intentional throwback, wrapping everything in intentional artifice to preserve something that was appealing for being primitive and not particularly thought-out. You can't go home again."
