= Winnifred Jong =

Canadian filmmaker

- Education: Toronto Metropolitan University
- Notable work: Tokens (2019-)

Winnifred Jong is a Canadian filmmaker who has worked as a script supervisor, writer, director and executive producer. She is most known as the creator of comedy web series Tokens.

== Career ==
Jong studied at Toronto Metropolitan University (TMU), graduating in 1992. After graduating, she worked for twenty years in the Canadian film and television industry as a script supervisor on productions including Bomb Girls, Born to Be Blue, Flashpoint, Slings & Arrows, The Virgin Suicides and X Company.

In 2012, Jong was second unit director and script supervisor for an episode of the police procedural television series Flashpoint. The following year, Jong was script supervisor and second unit director for Played.

In 2015, Jong directed her short film directorial debut, The Offer, starring Hugh Dillon. It was nominated for a Directors Guild of Canada (DGC) Award. In 2016, Jong was selected for the Women In the Director’s Chair (WIDC) mentoring program. She was named one of Playback's "5-to-Watch in 2018."

In 2019, Jong created, directed and executive produced Tokens, a comedy web series and satirical depiction of tokenism in the media that follows the lives of the actors of an "on call" casting agency who are dispatched to productions in order to fulfil mandated diversity quotas. Jong won Best Director in a Comedy for Tokens at the 2019 Asia Web Awards. The episode "The Goal" won Jong the Best Direction (Web Program or Series) award at the 11th Canadian Screen Awards in 2023. Jong was also nominated for Best Writing (Web Program or Series) at the awards. Tokens was launched on The Roku Channel in January 2023.

In 2020, Jong was awarded the 2020 Sandi Ross Award.

Jong directed the episode "Gliders" of the Canadian comedy-drama TV series Pretty Hard Cases, for which she was nominated in the Best Direction (Comedy) category at the 10th Canadian Screen Awards in 2022. She has also directed episodes of television shows including Coroner, Endlings, Heartland, Kings of Napa, My Life with the Walter Boys, Nurses and Private Eyes.

In 2025, Jong directed Oprah Winfrey Network (Canada)’s film Very Merry Mystery.
