= Alien Trespass =

2009 film by R. W. Goodwin

- Directed by: R.W. Goodwin
- Written by: Stephen P. Fisher
- Produced by: R.W. Goodwin; James Swift
- Starring: Eric McCormack; Jenni Baird; Robert Patrick; Jody Thompson; Sarah Smyth; Dan Lauria
- Cinematography: David Moxness
- Edited by: Vaune Kirby Frechette; Rangeland Productions; Michael Jablow
- Music by: Louis Febre
- Distributed by: Roadside Attractions
- Release date: April 3, 2009
- Running time: 90 minutes
- Country: United States
- Language: English

Alien Trespass is a 2009 science-fiction comedy film based on 1950s sci-fi B movies, produced by James Swift and directed by R.W. Goodwin. It stars Eric McCormack and Robert Patrick. The film was shot in Ashcroft, British Columbia.

== Plot ==
The story begins in 1957 in the star-filled skies above California's Mojave Desert. It is a special night for noted astronomer Ted Lewis, who is preparing a special anniversary dinner with steaks for his beautiful, adoring wife Lana while observing the annual meteor shower of the Perseids. In another part of town, Tammy, a waitress at a small local diner with big plans for the future, looks out her window and is excited to see a shooting star, which she takes as a good sign for her dreams.

Suddenly "something shoots overhead and crashes" in the nearby mountains. Assuming it is a fallen meteorite, Ted wants to investigate in person. He reaches the supposed meteorite, which turns out to be an alien spaceship. Then his body is usurped by Urp, a well-meaning, tall, and metallic alien. Urp has discovered that the other passenger of his ship, the one-eyed monster known as Ghota, has escaped. He needs to retrieve it and uses a human body to blend in with the locals.

The Ghota consumes people in order to grow, multiply, and conquer. Its unquenchable appetite could mean the end of life on Earth. Urp is the only one who knows how to stop the hideous extraterrestrial. He enlists the aid of Tammy, the only human in town willing to believe and trust in his mission. The local police – including Chief Dawson and Officer Vern – are confirmed skeptics and offer little help. Together, Urp and Tammy must hunt down the Ghota and neutralize it before it consumes all the local inhabitants and uses the human fuel to multiply and conquer the world.

Urp and Tammy eventually fall in love. But at the finale, he is compelled to return to his home in space and she is left longing for his company. While she remains on Earth, she finally leaves the small town to go in search of her own destiny.

== Cast ==
- Eric McCormack as Ted Lewis / Urp
- Jenni Baird as Tammy
- Robert Patrick as Vernon
- Jody Thompson as Lana Lewis
- Dan Lauria as Chief Dawson
- Sarah Smyth as Penny
- Aaron Brooks as Cody
- Andrew Dunbar as Dick
- Dayna Reid as Betsy
- Chelah Horsdal as Betsy's Mother
- Sage Brocklebank as Stu
- Jonathon Young as Lloyd
- Tom McBeath as Wilson

== Analysis ==
Roger Ebert pointed out that when monsters in 1950s B movies terrorized small, desert towns, there were production reasons behind the trope. Production costs for hiring extras and travel expenses were lower, and dry sunny weather was almost a guarantee. Filming in the deserts of California, relatively close to Hollywood and the Los Angeles area, meant many of crew and cast could 'commute' to the locations, if need be, and spend weekends at home. The film replicates the look and feel of 1950s science fiction film, with one notable exception: the movie is in color, while in the 1950s black-and-white was the norm, again for lower cost.

According to Ebert, Lana Lewis (Jody Thompson) is depicted as a "sexpot". Which recalls another feature of 1950s science fiction films. They often cast pin-up girls such as Cleo Moore and Mamie Van Doren in key roles. Ebert found the Ghota to be similar to the B.O.B from Monsters vs. Aliens (2009), which was also a tribute to 1950s films. Gary Westfahl found the unconventional romance between Urp and Tammy to be reminiscent of The Day the Earth Stood Still (1951). In that film, the alien Klaatu and human secretary Helen Benson fall in love, but they too end the film physically separated. Goodwin says that the film "cherry-pick[s]" elements from The Day the Earth Stood Still (1951), It Came from Outer Space (1953) and The War of the Worlds (1953).

== Reception ==
The film received mixed reviews. As of April 2025, it holds a 38% approval rating on aggregate review site Rotten Tomatoes, based on 66 reviews, with an average score of 4.89/10. The site's main consensus reads "An earnest attempt to parody campy 1950s sci-fi films, Alien Trespass eventually loses its charm among tedious dialogue and cheesy special effects." Metacritic, which uses a weighted average, assigned the film a score of 48 out of 100, based on 19 critics, indicating "mixed or average" reviews.

Film critic Roger Ebert gave the film two out of four stars and felt that the film was, "obviously a labor of love. But why? Is there a demand for cheesy 1950s sci-fi movies not met by the existing supply? Will younger audiences consider it to be merely inept, and not inept with an artistic intention? Here is a movie more suited to ComicCon or the World Science Fiction Convention than to your neighborhood multiplex". In her review for The New York Times, Jeannette Catsoulis described the film as "a charmingly sentimental but ultimately pointless hommage to the sci-fi classics of yesteryear". Betsy Sharkey, in her review for the Los Angeles Times, felt that "there is attention to detail throughout this film, and it's clear that Goodwin loves those old sci-fi movies – maybe a little too much. While Alien Trespass stays true to the era and the genre, it forgets that its mission in this galaxy is not merely to pay tribute but to entertain".

IGN mixed praise and complaint, saying, "Alien Trespass was clearly made with the intention to both emulate and satirize the classic B-movie sci-fi films of the 1950s – and not in a semi-serious Roland Emmerich kind of way, but in a careful replication of the era, complete with flying saucers, sub-par effects and some overly hammy acting. The problem, unfortunately, is that the movie aims to have it both ways and quite simply can't, straddling the cinematic line for about 10 minutes before falling gracelessly into its own confused voice." The reviewer added, however, "If Alien Trespass succeeds in any regard, it's simply in creating a world that feels, at least in spirit, like an authentic – or perhaps nostalgic – depiction of the period. The sets, the costumes, the cars, the vocal affectations – neither parody nor slavish recreation. And the visual effects, despite being created by CG to appear properly low-tech, feel enough like large plastic creatures and saucers on strings to blend seamlessly into the spirit of the piece. All in all, the design of the film is considerably more effective than its substance."

In his review for The Boston Globe, Ty Burr felt that the film was superior to Monsters vs. Aliens, saying "There's more simple joy to be found here than in all of DreamWorks' 3-D extravaganza, though – a pleasure that comes from laughing at the movie and with it at the same time". Entertainment Weekly gave the film a "B+" rating and Lisa Schwarzbaum praised its "warm tone, along with the picture's bright, saturated, anti-CGI look, is a welcome respite from jokes, irony, and the postmodern malaise of know-it-all-ness".

Gary Westfahl, a reviewer of science fiction, found this film and The Man from Earth (2007) to be overlooked gems of the genre. He hopes that they can both eventually be rediscovered. He found the film able to capture the "klutzy charm" and the true virtues of the 1950s science fiction films.

== See also ==
- Earth vs. the Flying Saucers
- Forbidden Planet
- Invaders from Mars
- Mars Attacks!
- The Lost Skeleton of Cadavra

== Sources ==
- Ebert, Roger (2012), "Alien Trespass", A Horrible Experience of Unbearable Length: More Movies That Suck, Andrews McMeel Publishing, ISBN 978-1449410254
- Westfahl, Gary (2012), "The ten best science fiction and fantasy films of the Twenty-first Century... as of December 31, 2010", A Sense-of-Wonderful Century: Explorations of Science Fiction and Fantasy Films, Wildside Press, ISBN 978-1434443717
- Westfahl, Gary (2012), "Notes from a mixed marriage; or, the Lady and the Monster", A Sense-of-Wonderful Century: Explorations of Science Fiction and Fantasy Films, Wildside Press, ISBN 978-1434443717
