= The Last Video Store =

2023 Canadian comedy horror film

- Directed by: Cody Kennedy; Tim Rutherford
- Written by: Joshua Roach; Tim Rutherford
- Produced by: Greg Jeffs; Laurence Gendron
- Starring: Kevin Martin; Yaayaa Adams; Matthew Kennedy; Josh Lenner; Leland Tilden
- Cinematography: Benji Irwin
- Edited by: Cody Kennedy
- Music by: Brandon Boucher
- Production companies: Genco Pictures; NJC Picture Company
- Distributed by: Blue Finch Film Releasing; Arrow Video (Home video distribution, US and UK)
- Release date: September 2023 (Fantastic Fest)
- Running time: 90 minutes
- Country: Canada
- Language: English
- Box office: $5,065

The Last Video Store is a 2023 Canadian comedy horror film directed by Cody Kennedy and Tim Rutherford, and starring Kevin Martin, Yaayaa Adams, Matthew Kennedy, Josh Lenner and Leland Tilden.

== Plot ==
A man sits on his couch watching a collection of B-grade movies on VHS, when a mysterious glowing black tape appears. Putting it in his VCR, the film’s text crawl talks about the video format wars and the rise and fall of video rental stores, before cutting to a promo for the last remaining store, Blaster Video. It advertises free rentals for new customers, as well as a free refrigerator magnet and a clearance sale of action film Fury of the Viper before fading to black.

Sometime later, Nyla enters the Blaster Video to return the tapes, meeting the store’s eccentric film buff owner Kevin, who deduces that the tapes belonged to her father. He offers to waive the late fees and rewind fees, while offering his synopsis and critique of the films: Beaverlake Massacre 4, a Friday the 13th style slasher; Preystalker , a sci-fi monster film like Predator; and Warpgate, a cheesy adventure movie. Nyla also has the possessed black tape, and when they play it, it locks them in and releases characters from the other films into the store.

The 1990s style CGI alien from Preystalker appears first, stabbing Kevin with a psychedelic, venom-laced stinger and menacing them, until it finally slips on a broken doorknob and despawns. Kevin tells Nyla that the black tape is the legendary cursed ‘Videonomicon’ that her father has apparently discovered. Soon after, “teenage” hockey player Taggert (played by an actor in his 30s) from Beaverlake Massacre appears and is attacked from behind by the movie’s hockey-masked killer, Castor. Kevin and Nyla lock themselves in the storage closet as Castor smashes Taggert through the door and decapitates him.

Knowing that Castor will reappear soon, Nyla attempts to escape through the air ducts, and Kevin reveals that he actually sympathized with Castor as a kid due to them both being bullied, even drawing a picture of the two as “teammates”. Castor slashes Nyla, but the air duct collapses on him, seemingly killing him. However, he reanimates and is about to kill Nyla when Kevin plays the Fury of the Viper tape, releasing its '80s action hero Jackson Viper, who battles Castor, winning the fight by ripping off his mask. They try to have Viper karate kick the exit door but discover it opens up into an endless glowing void inside the tape. Nyla reveals that her father died and left her nothing except a note asking her to return the tapes to Kevin.

The pair come up with a plan to defeat the cursed tape by erasing it with his collection of refrigerator magnets, which are revealed to be the downfall of the store after erasing many of the rented movies and driving away customers. However, Jackson reads a magazine written by Kevin proclaiming him as the worst sequel of all the Viper movies and, in a rage, he destroys all of his previous movies and forces Kevin to smash his prized copy of Double Split, the best Viper film. The cursed tape then possesses Jackson, transforming him into a literal half-human, half-viper creature and attempting to force Kevin into the void through the TV. Remembering Kevin’s advice about defeating evil with the “power of friendship”, she returns Castor’s mask and encourages him to save his teammate. Castor rips Jackson’s face off, and Nyla decapitates him with Castor’s hockey stick.

The entity inside the tape, a VHS-shaped robot creature, begins to escape from the TV, but Kevin sacrifices himself by being hurled into it with the magnet, eventually reaching the black hole spool of tape at the center and erasing it. An exhausted Nyla finds a new membership card with a free rental ticket left for her by Kevin and exits the store.

Inside the TV, Kevin survives and drops into the movie Warpgate, where he reunites with Castor and they prepare to battle that film’s alien villain.

As the end credits play, the entire film is rewound and shown in reverse back to the title.

== Cast ==
- Kevin Martin as Kevin
- Yaayaa Adams as Nyla
- Matthew Kennedy as Taggert
- Josh Lenner as Viper
- Leland Tilden as Castor Creeley

== Release ==
The Last Video Store premiered at Fantastic Fest in September 2023. It later screened at FrightFest in London, England, in 2023, and at the Calgary Underground Film Festival in April 2024.

== Reception ==
On the review aggregator website Rotten Tomatoes, the film has an approval rating of 75% based on eight reviews, with an average rating of 6.4/10.

Drew Tinnin of Dread Central gave the film a rating of three-and-a-half out of five stars, writing: "The Last Video Store doesn't land every self-referential joke, far from it actually. Still, the loving homage to the so-bad-it’s-good movies of our childhood just manages to outshine some of the more trying moments of tedium that inevitably come along with this type of sentimentality, a feature that's quickly becoming a subgenre within a subgenre." Matt Donato of /Film gave the film a rating of 7/10, and wrote that while it is "nowhere near a perfect homage to an era of movie-watching that's all but outdated", it is "sincere and resourceful when it counts."

Film critic Kim Newman wrote: "Hyperactive Martin, a real-life DVD store owner, and sceptical Adams make a decent team and it even has a few moments of proper horror amid the retro-trash celebration." Martin Unsworth of Starburst gave the film three out of five stars, writing that the "enthusiasm of all involved is contagious", though he perceived the film as being somewhat derivative, writing: "As it stands, it's a lot of fun, but we can't help feeling that it's all been done before."

Rue Morgue's Ryan Dyer commended the film's special effects, and concluded: "The Last Video Store serves as either a reminder of or, for the younger generation, an introduction to this world, as the viewer experiences the film through the cinephilic Martin, who has seen too many movies to count and knows all the tropes, or through Nyla, who is introduced to this niche thanks to Martin's enthusiasm."
