= Scared Shitless =

- Film poster
- Directed by: Vivieno Caldinelli
- Written by: Brandon Cohen
- Produced by: Lewis Spring
- Starring: Steven Ogg; Daniel Doheny; Chelsea Clark; Mark McKinney
- Cinematography: Rudolf Blahacek
- Edited by: Christopher Minns
- Music by: Blitz//Berlin
- Production company: Happy Cat Productions
- Release date: July 21, 2024 (Fantasia)
- Running time: 76 minutes
- Country: Canada
- Language: English

Scared Shitless is a 2024 Canadian comedy horror film, directed by Vivieno Caldinelli. The film stars Steven Ogg as Don, a plumber who must team up with his mysophobic son Sonny (Daniel Doheny) to battle a genetically engineered bloodthirsty monster that is loose in the plumbing system of an apartment building.

The cast also includes Chelsea Clark, Mark McKinney, Julian Richings, Marty Adams, Marcia Bennett, Brynn Godenir, Donald Tripe, Lorna Wilson and Tal Zimerman.

It premiered at the 28th Fantasia International Film Festival, where it was second runner-up for the Audience Award for Best Canadian Feature.

The film was acquired for streaming distribution on Netflix.

== Critical response ==
For Original Cin, Thom Ernst wrote that "the budget, rumoured to be modest, shows no signs of hampering the production. If anything, the limitations forced smarter decisions. The monster, a many-tentacled sewage-dweller, is convincing enough to be threatening, but silly enough to let audiences enjoy the lunacy. Nothing looks cheap; everything looks intentional. It’s the kind of resourcefulness that makes low-budget Canadian filmmaking so easy to root for."
