= Late Night Double Feature =

Late Night Double Feature is a Canadian horror anthology film which premiered at the 2014 New York City Horror Film Festival. The film was picked up by Parade Deck Films for distribution in North America.

== Summary ==
During a late night taping of Dr. Nasty's Cavalcade of Horror, bloody chaos takes place while screening two features (Dinner for Monsters and Slit). Samantha/Nurse Nasty is frustrated with how the show is being run by its womanizing director and its drunk and crazy host, Dr. Nasty.

== Reception ==
Late Night Double Feature won the award for Best in Horror at the 2015 Hot Springs International Horror Film Festival. The film received a 3 out of 4 rating from Fangoria.
