= She Who Must Burn =

- Directed by: Larry Kent
- Written by: Larry Kent; Shane Twerdun
- Starring: Sarah Smyth; Shane Twerdun; Missy Cross; Jim Francis
- Cinematography: Stirling Bancroft
- Music by: Chris Alexander
- Production companies: Palama Film Productions; White Buffalo Films
- Release date: 26 July 2015 (Fantasia Fest)
- Running time: 90 minutes
- Country: Canada
- Language: English

She Who Must Burn is a 2015 horror film that was directed by Larry Kent. He co-wrote the film with Shane Twerdun, who also stars. The movie had its world premiere on 26 July 2015 at the Fantasia Film Festival and stars Sarah Smyth as a woman who finds herself the target of anti-abortion activists.

== Synopsis ==
Angela (Sarah Smyth) used to work at a doctor's office that was shut down after its doctor was shot to death by anti-abortion protester Abraham Baarker (James Wilson), who was arrested soon after. Undeterred, Angela decides to open a home clinic where she provides basic services – something that puts her at odds with the rest of the Baarker family, who believes that she is performing abortions. They also believe that she's to blame for recent infant deaths (implied to be due to water pollution), which they see as a sign of God's disapproval. Things are made more tense when Angela helps the wife (Jewel Staite) of one of the Baarkers flee an abusive marriage.

== Cast ==
- Sarah Smyth as Angela
- Shane Twerdun as Jeremiah Baarker
- Jewel Staite as Margaret Baarker
- James Wilson as Abraham Baarker
- Missy Cross as Rebecca Baarker
- Andrew Dunbar as Caleb Baarker
- Jim Francis as Sheriff
- Andrew Moxham as Mac
- Bart Anderson as Errol
- Steve Bradley as Daryl
- Pericles Creticos as Demetrius
- Havana Guppy as Annie

== Reception ==
Critical reception has been positive. Variety gave She Who Must Burn a positive review, comparing it favorably to films like The Sacrament and Holy Ghost People. Twitch Film remarked that the movie was "not an easy film to watch, its power will either dig deep into you to horrify or elicit uncomfortable laughter at how in-your-face it play its drama. The film seems practically designed to make distributors, programmers and other content providers run for the hills. I'm old enough to remember when they called that sort of thing art." Dread Central gave the film an extremely positive review and praised it for its visuals and acting.
