= Norwalk Schools =

Norwalk Schools may refer to:

- Education in Norwalk, Connecticut
- Norwalk Community School District
