= Norwalk High School (Iowa) =

Public secondary school in Norwalk, Iowa, United States

Location
- 1201 North Avenue; Norwalk, Iowa 50211; United States; 41°28′29″N 93°40′14″W

Information
- School type: Public secondary
- Motto: Learning for a Lifetime
- School district: Norwalk Community School District
- Superintendent: Shawn Holloway
- Principal: Chris Basinger
- Staff: 62.31 (FTE)
- Grades: 9-12
- Age range: 13-19
- Student to teacher ratio: 16.61
- Colors: Purple and Black
- Athletics conference: Little Hawkeye
- Team name: Warriors
- Newspaper: The Spear
- Website: nhs.norwalkschools.org

Norwalk High School is a public high school, part of the Norwalk Community School District, located in the town of Norwalk, Iowa, which is roughly five miles south of Des Moines.

== Activities ==
Students at Norwalk High School can participate in numerous activities, including Drama, Marching Band, Jazz Band, Choir, Blackshirts Tech Warriors and Cheerleading.

== Athletics ==
The Warriors compete in the Little Hawkeye Conference in the following sports:

- Baseball
  - 3-time Class 3A State Champions (1982, 2009, 2020)
- Basketball (boys and girls)
  - Girls' - 2-time State Champions (1981, 2006)
  - Boys’ - 1-time State Champion (2020)
- Bowling (boys and girls)
- Cross Country (boys and girls)
- Football
- Golf (boys and girls)
- Soccer (boys and girls)
  - Boys' - 4-time state champs (2007(1A), 2014(2A), 2016(2A), 2017(2A))
- Softball
  - 2005 Class 3A State Champions
- Tennis (boys and girls)
- Track and Field (boys and girls)
- Volleyball
- Wrestling

== Notable alumni ==
- Matt Dermody (2009), Major League Baseball pitcher
- Joel Hanrahan (2000), former Major League Baseball pitcher
- Jason Momoa (1997), Actor (Aquaman)
- Jeremy Stephens (2004), professional mixed martial artist, currently competing in the UFC's Featherweight Division
- Brandon Routh (1998), Actor (Superman Returns)

== See also ==
- List of high schools in Iowa
