= Brandon Routh =

American actor (born 1979)

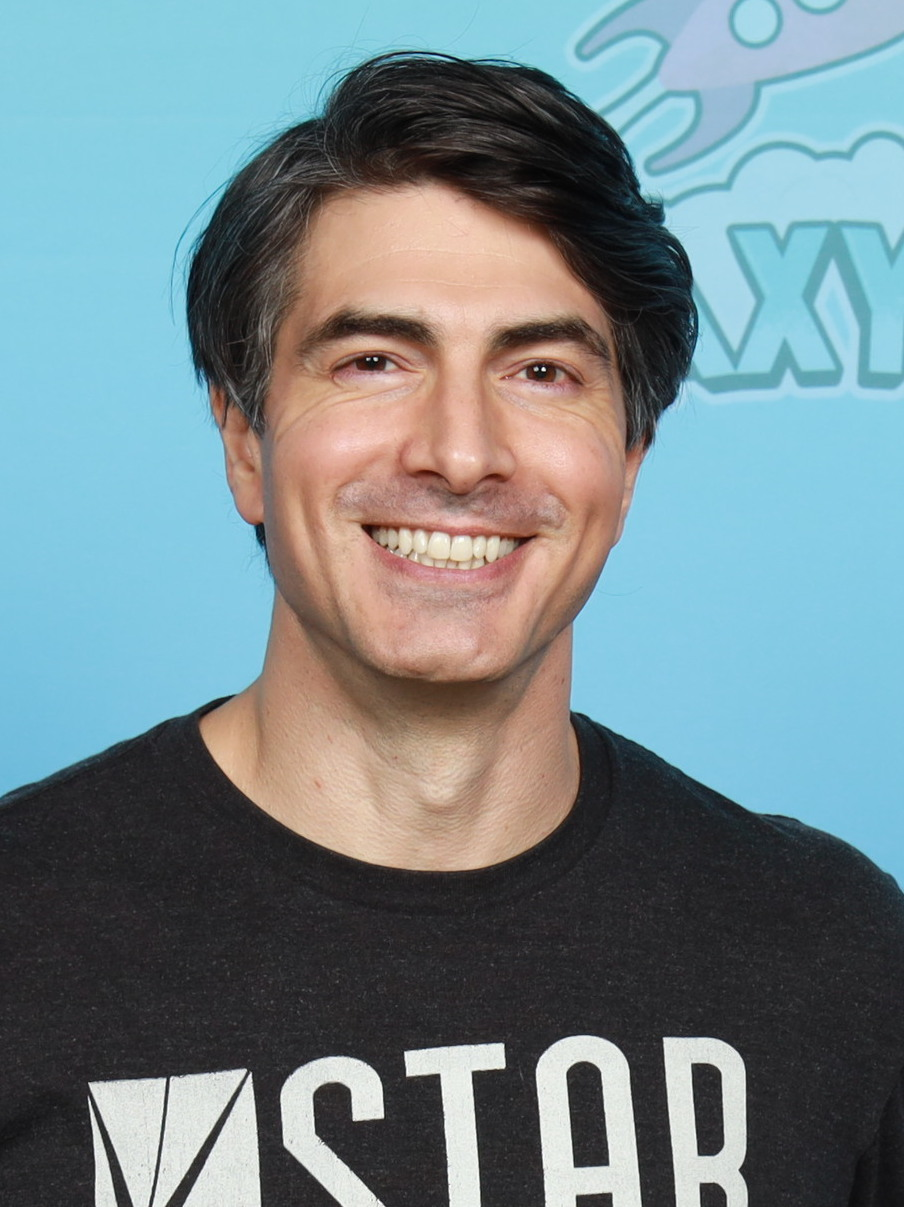
- Routh in 2026
- Born: October 9, 1979 (age 47); Des Moines, Iowa, U.S.
- Education: University of Iowa (attended)
- Occupation: Actor
- Years active: 1999–present
- Spouse: Courtney Ford (m. 2007; div. 2025)
- Children: 1

Brandon Routh (/ˈraʊθ/; born October 9, 1979) is an American actor. His portrayal of Superman in the 2006 film Superman Returns garnered him international fame. In 2011, he played the title character of the film Dylan Dog: Dead of Night. He also had a recurring role in the NBC series Chuck, as Daniel Shaw. Routh also played Todd Ingram in the film Scott Pilgrim vs. the World (2010), reprising the role in the animated series Scott Pilgrim Takes Off (2023).

In 2014, he was cast in a recurring role as Ray Palmer / The Atom on the TV series Arrow. He later played that role on two other series in the Arrowverse shared universe: The Flash (a guest role) and Legends of Tomorrow (a starring role). Routh also reprised his roles as Superman and The Atom in the 2019 Arrowverse crossover event "Crisis on Infinite Earths". His role on Legends of Tomorrow ended in 2020, and Routh made his final appearance as the character in The Flash in 2022.

== Early life ==
Routh was born in Des Moines, Iowa, United States; the third of four children born to Catherine (née Lear), a teacher and jazz singer, and Ronald Routh, a carpenter and jazz drummer. He was raised in nearby Norwalk. Routh was raised in a Methodist family, and has English, Scottish, German, Irish, Welsh and Dutch ancestry.

Routh grew up in Norwalk, approximately 100 miles (160 km) south of Woolstock, the birthplace of George Reeves, the first actor to play Superman on television. During his childhood, Routh thought a full-time acting career was unrealistic, citing his small-town background. In his spare time, he played the trumpet and the piano.

Routh attended Norwalk High School, where he played sports such as soccer and swimming, and participated in music and theatre. He attended this school at the same time as Jason Momoa, who would also later become an actor in film adaptations of DC Comics. He has described himself as a "momma's boy" and not "the most popular kid" during his school years. Routh has also noted that during his younger years, he was fond of the Superman films.

Routh attended the University of Iowa for a year, aspiring to be a fantasy writer and graphic design artist. During this time, at the encouragement of some school colleagues, he took up modeling in order to earn his tuition expenses. The summer following his Freshman year, he moved out to L.A. for a "trial run" at acting and booked his first gig within a month. It was then he was "hooked" and decided to pursue acting full-time.

Routh has said he was often told that he bore a physical resemblance to Christopher Reeve, who had previously portrayed Superman in a film series. His former manager signed him on because of the resemblance, telling him that he thought Routh would be cast as Superman if there were another film in the series.

== Career ==
=== Early career ===
In 1999, Routh left the university and moved to Manhattan and then Los Angeles, where he pursued a full-time acting career, first appearing as an extra in Christina Aguilera's 1999 music video for "What a Girl Wants". He was cast in his first acting role that same year, in an episode of the short-lived ABC television series Odd Man Out. In 2000, he had a four-episode role on season 3 of MTV's nighttime soap opera Undressed. Routh subsequently appeared on the WB's Gilmore Girls (in a February 2001 episode, "Concert Interruptus", playing a Bangles concert attendee), and earned steady work on the soap opera One Life to Live, playing Seth Anderson from May 23, 2001, until April 17, 2002.

=== Superman ===
Prior to Routh's casting as Superman in the film Superman Returns, Warner Bros. had spent over a decade developing a plan to relaunch the franchise, entitled Superman Flyby, with possible stars including actors such as Nicolas Cage, Josh Hartnett, Brendan Fraser, Tom Welling (who previously played a younger version of Clark Kent in the 2001–2011 TV series Smallville), Paul Walker, Henry Cavill (who eventually became Superman in the 2013 film Man of Steel), James Marsden (who would go on to play Lois Lane's fiancée in the film), Ashton Kutcher, Keanu Reeves, Will Smith, Johnny Depp and James Caviezel, and planned directors including Tim Burton, Wolfgang Petersen, McG, Brett Ratner, and Shekhar Kapur. When director Bryan Singer came aboard the project, however, he insisted an unknown actor be cast in the part, in the tradition of the casting of the best-known film Superman, Christopher Reeve.

Routh, then 24, had previously auditioned for director McG and was spotted by Singer after he viewed Routh's videotaped audition. Singer, who has since stated that Routh was the embodiment of "our collective memory of Superman," was impressed by Routh's resemblance to the comic book icon and found the actor's humble Midwestern roots perfect for the role, as well as his "combination of vulnerability and confidence", which Singer said reminded him of Christopher Reeve. Singer decided to cast Routh after the two met on August 13, 2004, but did not tell Routh until two months later, when Routh's casting was announced in October 2004, making him an "instant celebrity".

Before filming began, Routh bulked up for the role, gaining 22 pounds to reach a high of 218 pounds. Filming for Superman Returns began in Sydney in February 2005. The film was released in the U.S. on June 28, 2006, and earned decent reviews from most critics, but was a box office disappointment, grossing only $200 million in the US compared to its estimated budget of $270 million. Routh was signed on to appear in two potential sequels, but due to mediocre box office results those never materialised.

Reviews of Routh's performance were generally positive, with Newsweek noting he "effortlessly lays claim to the iconic role." On the other hand, film critic Roger Ebert felt that "Routh lacks charisma as Superman, and I suppose as Clark Kent, he isn't supposed to have any."

At the 2006 Spike TV Awards, Routh won the award of "Best Superhero" as Superman in Superman Returns, beating out among others, Hugh Jackman as Wolverine.

In August 2008, Warner Bros. officially announced they intended to reboot the Superman franchise. Routh was still set to reprise the role, according to DC Comics president Paul Levitz. In 2009, however, Routh's contract to play Superman in another film expired, but he said at the time that he would like to return if given the chance. However, British actor Henry Cavill was cast to play Superman in the reboot of the series, Man of Steel.

=== Subsequent projects ===
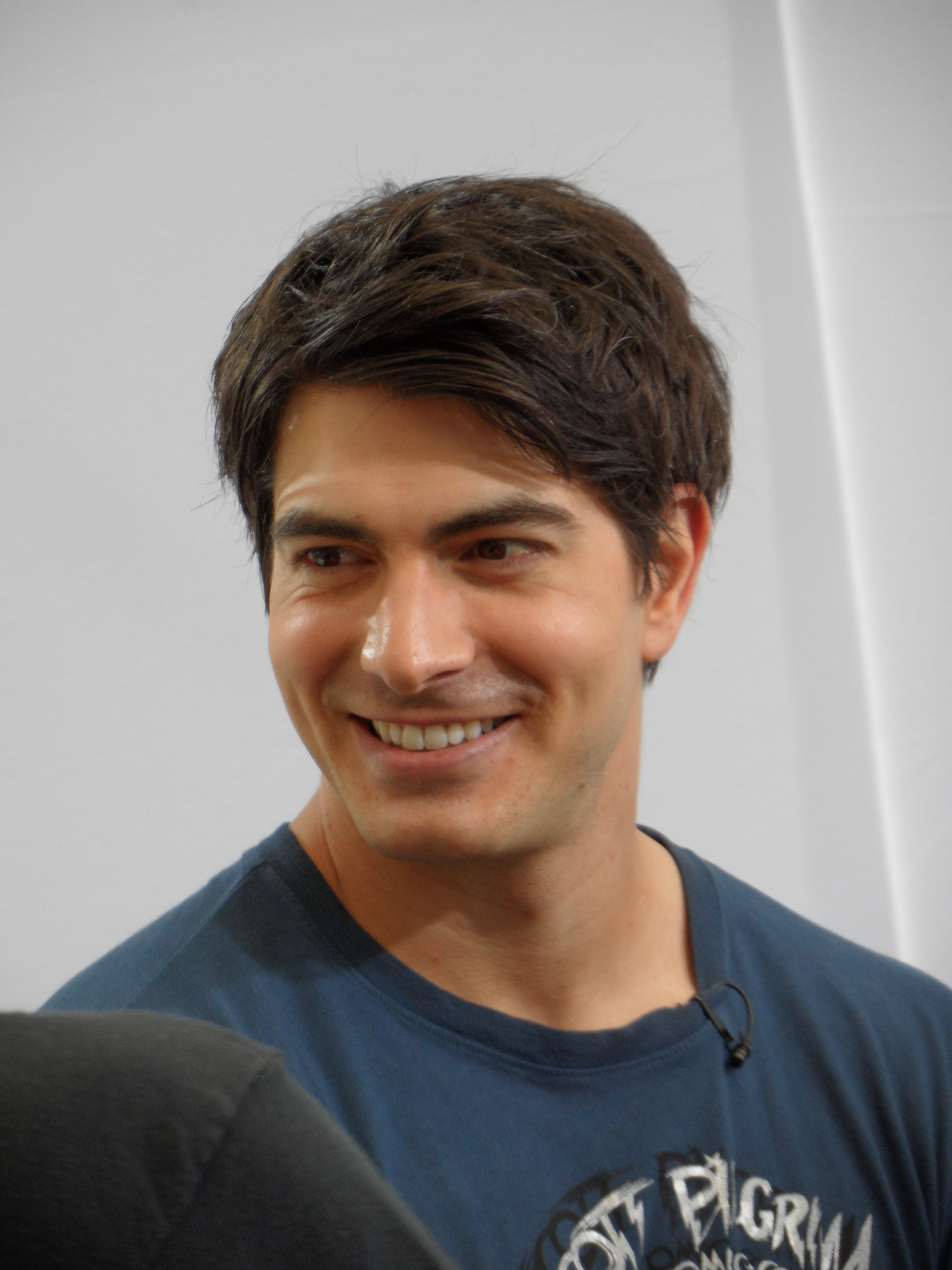
Routh in 2011

After the release of Superman Returns, Routh signed on to play CIA agent John Clark in Without Remorse, under the direction of John Singleton with a screenplay by Stuart Beattie. Routh would be the third actor to portray the character, after Willem Dafoe and Liev Schreiber. The film was intended for a late-2007/early-2008 release. However, Paramount Pictures put the film into turnaround. Routh's future participation on the project is unknown.

Routh appeared in the independent romantic drama Fling (formerly titled Lie to Me) (2008), co-starring his wife Courtney Ford, and the ensemble film Life is Hot in Cracktown (2009).

Routh was signed to star in The Informers (2009), an ensemble film based on Bret Easton Ellis' novel, with Kim Basinger, Amber Heard, and Billy Bob Thornton, but his scenes ended up scrapped with the decision to excise the "vampire" subplot from the film entirely.

At Comic Con 2008, it was revealed Routh was to have a cameo in the Kevin Smith comedy Zack and Miri Make a Porno – he instead appeared as a minor character, Bobby Long – and would serve as a judge on Platinum Studios 2008 Comic Book Challenge. In addition, he has a cameo where he plays himself in the Bollywood film Kambakkht Ishq (2009).

Routh played Todd Ingram in the action comedy Scott Pilgrim vs. the World (2010) which was directed by Edgar Wright, based on the Scott Pilgrim series by Canadian artist Bryan Lee O'Malley. His character is an arrogant, narcissistic bass player who derives psychic powers from his vegan lifestyle, and is the third of the seven Evil Exes the title character must fight.

Routh plays Daniel Shaw in season 3 of spy series Chuck, in a recurring, supporting role. He again played this character in the show's fifth season.

He portrayed supernatural detective Dylan Dog in the 2011 film Dylan Dog – Dead of Night. The film is based on the Italian comic series created by Tiziano Sclavi. The film was a box office flop.

In 2012, Routh starred in David Kohan and Max Mutchnick's CBS half-hour, multicamera comedy series, Partners. He played Michael Urie's character's steady partner, alongside David Krumholtz and his Table for Three co-star Sophia Bush. The show was cancelled after only six episodes had aired.

In 2013, Routh appeared in the video game Call of Duty: Ghosts. Routh has since appeared in one episode of The Millers and multiple episodes of Chosen and Enlisted in 2014. That same year, he starred in the Hallmark Channel's Christmas-themed romantic comedy The Nine Lives of Christmas, which drew good reviews and high ratings.

In 2014, Routh once again played a superhero for DC Comics as Ray Palmer / The Atom on The CW's Arrow. He was a recurring character throughout season three.

In January 2015, Arrow's co-creator and executive producer Greg Berlanti stated that they were in the midst of "very early" preliminary talks for an additional spin-off series centred on Ray Palmer/The Atom.

In the superhero series Legends of Tomorrow (2016–2022), Routh co-starred as The Atom, along with Arthur Darvill, Wentworth Miller, Victor Garber, and Caity Lotz.

Routh reprised his roles as both Ray Palmer / The Atom and as Clark Kent / Superman in the 2019–2020 Arrowverse crossover "Crisis on Infinite Earths", affected by events adapted from the Kingdom Come storyline. The suit he wore as Superman was based on the one worn by the storyline's version of the character. The following month, it was announced that Routh would depart Legends of Tomorrow as a series regular during the fifth season. His final episode as a series regular was "Romeo v. Juliet: Dawn of Justness".

Following this, Routh made three returns to the franchise. First, he returned to Legends for its 100th episode, and to The Flash for the first part of its season eight-opening event "Armageddon". He would then return in the season's eighteenth episode, "The Man in the Yellow Tie".

In 2021, Routh appeared in The Nine Kittens of Christmas, a sequel to The Nine Lives of Christmas. In 2023, Routh appeared in an episode of Quantum Leap portraying a naval commander: Alexander Augustine. That same year, Routh reprised his role as Todd Ingram in the Netflix animated series Scott Pilgrim Takes Off.

== Personal life ==
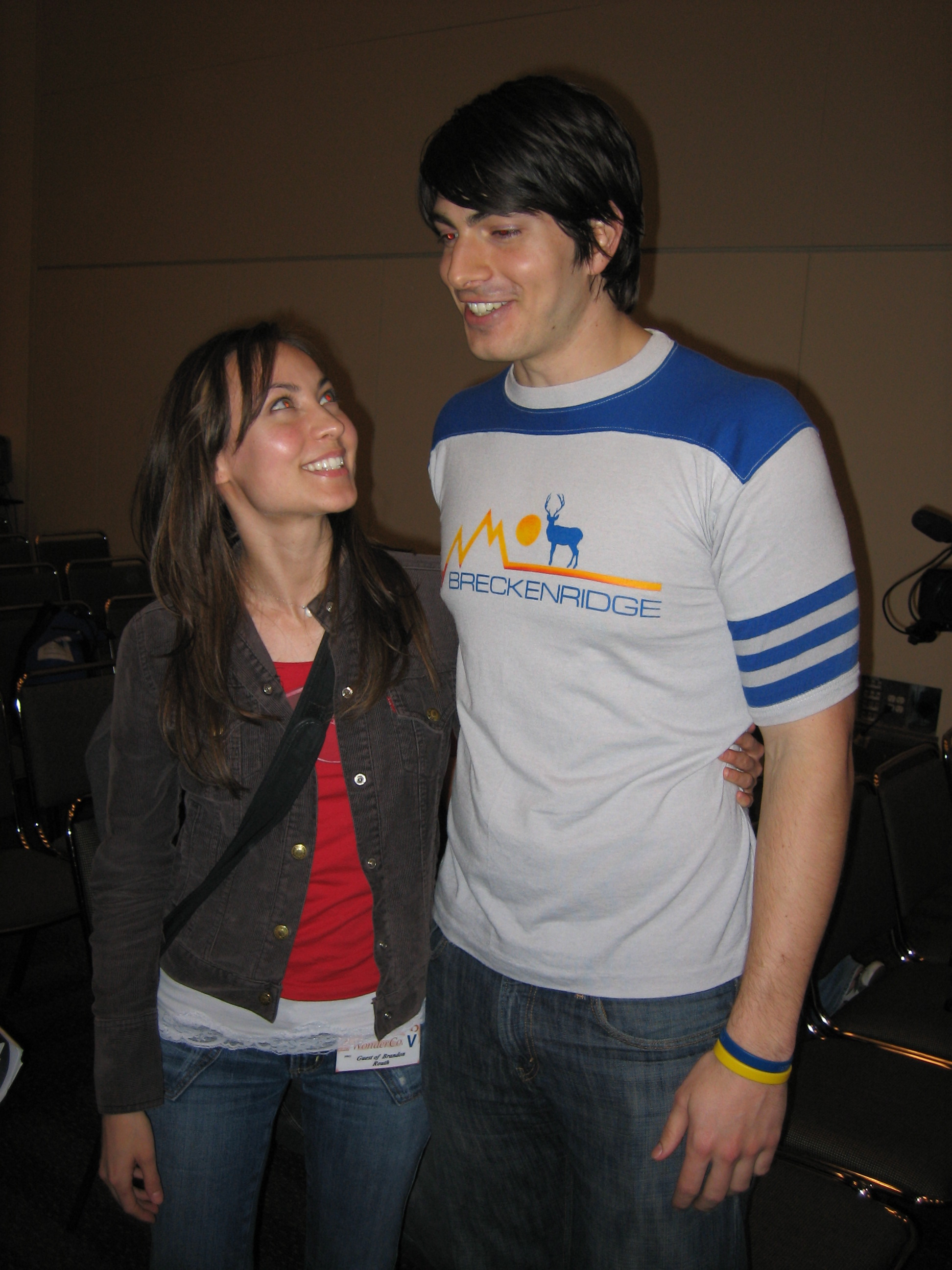
Courtney Ford and Brandon Routh in February 2006

On August 23, 2006, Brandon became engaged to his girlfriend of three years, actress Courtney Ford; the couple married on November 24, 2007, at the El Capitan Ranch in Santa Barbara. In 2012, the couple had a son. Ford filed for divorce on January 8, 2025, citing "irreconcilable differences". As of late January, it was reported that Routh and Ford had reached a divorce settlement and were submitting their paperwork to court. Routh and Ford wrote a note to fans on Instagram stating "To everyone who has loved and supported us...we have decided to begin a new journey, and enter this next chapter of life as friends and co-parents. We are now and forever rooting for each other as we move through this wild adventure called life. Our son is, and will always be, our highest priority..."

As of July 2025, Routh has been dating American actress, Rachael Leigh Cook.

Routh's sister, Sara, has a musical track entitled "You're Never Gone" on Sound of Superman, the soundtrack of Superman Returns. Routh is a fan and player of the video game World of Warcraft. During the 2008 Presidential election, Routh spoke at an Iowa rally in support of Democratic candidate Barack Obama.

== Filmography ==
=== Film ===
Year	Title	Role	Notes
2006	Karla	Tim Peters	
2006	Denial	Man	Short film
2006	Superman Returns	Clark Kent / Superman	
2006	Look, Up in the Sky! The Amazing Story of Superman	Himself	Documentary
2008	Fling	James	Also co-producer
2008	Zack and Miri Make a Porno	Bobby Long	
2009	Life Is Hot in Cracktown	Sizemore	
2009	Stuntmen	Kirby Popoff	
2009	Table for Three	Scott Teller	
2009	Kambakkht Ishq	Himself	Cameo
2009	Miss Nobody	Milo Beeber	
2009	The Informers	Bruce	Deleted scenes
2010	Unthinkable	Agent Jackson	
2010	Scott Pilgrim vs. the World	Todd Ingram	
2011	Dylan Dog: Dead of Night	Dylan Dog	
2011	Cost of Living	Silus	Short film
2011	Number Nine	John	Short film
2012	Crooked Arrows	Joe Logan	
2014	Missing William	James Anderson	
2015	400 Days	Captain Theo Cooper	
2016	Lost in the Pacific	Mike	
2020	Anastasia: Once Upon a Time	Tsar Nicholas II	
2024	Ick	Hank Wallace	
2025	Out of Order	John/Jack	
TBA	Fate	Sam Ellis	Post-production

=== Television ===
Year	Title	Role	Notes
1999	Odd Man Out	Connor Williams	Episode: "You've Got Female"
2000	Undressed	Wade	4 episodes
2000	Gilmore Girls	Party Guy at Concert	Episode: "Concert Interruptus"
2001–2002	One Life to Live	Seth Anderson	Recurring role
2003	Cold Case	Young Henry Phillips	Episode: "A Time to Hate"
2004	Will & Grace	Sebastian	Episode: "A Gay/December Romance"
2004	Oliver Beene	Brian	Episode: "Dibs"
2005	Awesometown	Officer Dino Wong	Television short
2006	The Batman	John Marlowe / Everywhere Man (voice)	Episode: "The Everywhere Man"
2008	Fear Itself	Bobby	Episode: "Community"
2010–2011	Chuck	Daniel Shaw	12 episodes
2012–2013	Partners	Wyatt Plank	13 episodes
2013–2014	Chosen	Max Gregory	6 episodes
2013	Newsreaders	Miles Van Cleef	Episode: "Hedge Fun"
2014	The Exes	Steve	2 episodes
2014	Enlisted	Brandon Stone	2 episodes
2014	The Millers	Officer Dixon	Episode: "Carol's Surprise"
2014	The Nine Lives of Christmas	Zachary Stone	Television film
2014–2016, 2020	Arrow	Ray Palmer / The Atom	21 episodes
2015–2016, 2019, 2021–2022	The Flash	Ray Palmer / The Atom	5 episodes
2015–2016, 2019, 2021–2022	The Flash	Clark Kent / Superman (Earth-96)	Episode: "Crisis on Infinite Earths: Part Three"
2016–2021	Legends of Tomorrow	Clark Kent / Superman (Earth-96)	Episode: "Crisis on Infinite Earths: Part Five"
2016–2021	Legends of Tomorrow	Ray Palmer / The Atom	Main role (Seasons 1–5), Special guest (season 7)
2016	Vixen	Ray Palmer / The Atom	Web series; voice role; 3 episodes
2016	Lady Dynamite	Jack Tripper	Episode: "Jack and Diane"
2017	Vixen: The Movie	Ray Palmer / The Atom	Voice role
2019	Black-ish	Banner Copeland	Episode: "Is It Desert or Dessert?"
2019	Are You Afraid of the Dark?	Theo Coscarelli	Episode: "Part Two: Opening Night"
2019	Supergirl	Ray Palmer / The Atom	Episode: "Crisis on Infinite Earths: Part One"
2019	Batwoman	Ray Palmer / The Atom	Episode: "Crisis on Infinite Earths: Part Two"
2019	Batwoman	Clark Kent / Superman (Earth-96)	Episode: "Crisis on Infinite Earths: Part Two"
2020	Home Movie: The Princess Bride	Westley/Princess Buttercup	Episode: "Chapter Six: The Fire Swamp"
2021	The Rookie	Officer Doug Stanton	Recurring role (Season 3); 5 episodes
2021	The Nine Kittens of Christmas	Zachary Stone	Television film
2021	Slugfest	Joe Simon	Roku Channel documentary series
2021	With Love	Leo	Recurring role
2023	Quantum Leap	XO Alexander Augustine	Episode: "S.O.S."
2023	Scott Pilgrim Takes Off	Todd Ingram	Voice role
2025	A Keller Christmas Vacation	Cal	Television film
2026	Ace Combat: Hour Zero	Doctor	Prequel series to Ace Combat 8: Wings of Theve

=== Video games ===
Year	Title	Role	Notes	Ref.
2006	Superman Returns	Clark Kent / Superman		
2013	Call of Duty: Ghosts	David "Hesh" Walker		
2018	Lego DC Super-Villains	Ray Palmer / The Atom		
2019	Magic: The Gathering Arena	Ral Zarek		

=== Music videos ===
Year	Artist	Title
1999	Christina Aguilera	"What a Girl Wants"
2006	The Lonely Island	"Part 1: The Avon Lady"
2018	Sugarland	"Babe"

== Awards and nominations ==
Year	Award	Category	Nominated work	Result
2006	Golden Schmoes Awards	Breakthrough Performance of the Year	Superman Returns	Nominated
2006	Scream Awards	Best Superhero	Superman Returns	Won
2006	Scream Awards	Breakout Performance	Superman Returns	Nominated
2006	ShoWest Awards	Male Star of Tomorrow	Superman Returns	Won
2006	Teen Choice Awards	Choice Breakout Movie Star – Male	Superman Returns	Nominated
2006	Teen Choice Awards	Choice Movie Chemistry (Shared w/ Kate Bosworth)	Superman Returns	Nominated
2006	Teen Choice Awards	Choice Movie Rumble	Superman Returns	Nominated
2006	Saturn Awards	Rising Star	Superman Returns	Won
2007	Saturn Awards	Best Actor	Superman Returns	Won
2007	Empire Awards	Best Male Newcomer	Superman Returns	Won
2010	IGN Awards	Best Villain	Chuck	Won
2010	Detroit Film Critics Society Awards	Best Ensemble	Scott Pilgrim vs. the World	Nominated
2011	Scream Awards	Best Villain	Scott Pilgrim vs. the World	Nominated
2019	Teen Choice Awards	Choice TV Actor: Action	Legends of Tomorrow	Nominated
