= Kimberley Sustad =

Canadian actor (born 1987)

- Born: May 27, 1987 (age 39); Ottawa, Ontario, Canada
- Occupations: Actor, Writer
- Years active: 2009–present
- Spouse: Scot Sustad (m. 2004)
- Children: 2

Kimberley Starmer is a Canadian actress.

Starmer started her acting career in theater. She has appeared on film and television since 2009 and is known for starring in several Hallmark Channel movies.

== Filmography ==
Year	Title	Role	Notes
2009	Live Henry Live		Short film
2011	Thunderballs	Nikki	TV movie
2012	Alcatraz	Charlotte	1 episode
2012	A Bride for Christmas	Vivian Patterson	TV movie
2012	Primeval: New World	Brooke Cross	3 episodes
2012, 2020	Supernatural	Betty, Amanda Willer	2 episodes
2013	Motive	Katie	1 episode
2013	Continuum	Patsy	1 episode
2013	Super Buddies	Joanne	Direct-to-video
2013	Baby Sellers	Bethany	TV movie
2013	Down River	Christie	Film
2013–2014	Spooksville	Madeline Templeton	Recurring role
2014	A Bit of Bad Luck	Sandy	Film, uncredited
2014	Signed, Sealed, Delivered	Melissa	1 episode
2014	Witches of East End	Gorgeous Young Woman	1 episode
2014	The Nine Lives of Christmas	Marilee White	TV movie
2015	Gourmet Detective	Sally Aldridge	TV movie
2015–2016	The Romeo Section	Kelly Hadler	Recurring role (season 1), guest appearance (season 2)
2016	All Things Valentine	McKenna	TV movie
2016	Hearts of Christmas	Isabel	TV movie
2017	Walking the Dog	Delia	TV movie
2017	Sight Unseen: An Emma Fielding Mystery	Perry	TV movie
2017	The Real Stephen Blatt	Interviewer	Miniseries
2018	Past Malice: An Emma Fielding Mystery	Perry Quinn	TV movie
2018	Cooking with Love	Jessica	TV movie
2018	Chesapeake Shores	Caroline Moss	2 episodes
2018	A Godwink Christmas	Paula Mayer	TV movie
2018	Travelers	Joanne Yates	Recurring role (season 3)
2019	Unspeakable	Caitlyn Hartley	Miniseries, 4 episodes
2019	The Twilight Zone	Helen Foley	1 episode
2019	Morning Show Mysteries: Death by Design	Lana Brown	TV movie
2019	Amish Abduction	Officer Peterson	TV movie
2019	Sense, Sensibility & Snowmen	Marianne	TV movie
2020	You Me Her	Julia	1 episode
2020	Wedding Every Weekend	Brooke	TV movie
2020	Christmas by Starlight	Annie Park	TV movie; also co-story writer
2020	Spotlight on Christmas	Paparazzi	TV movie
2021	The Nine Kittens of Christmas	Dr. Marilee White	TV movie
2022	North to Home	Beth	TV movie
2022	Lights, Camera, Christmas!	Kerry	TV movie
2022	Three Wise Men and a Baby	Doctor	TV movie; also writer
2023	Game of Love	Audrey	Film
2023	Fourth Down and Love	Sideline Reporter	TV movie
2023	To All a Good Night	Ceci	TV movie
2023	Magic in Mistletoe	Debbie	TV movie
2024	The Real West	Rebecca	TV movie
2024	Aurora Teagarden Mysteries: Death at the Diner	Larissa Moore	TV movie
2024	Three Wiser Men and a Baby	Dr. Maclaren	TV movie; also writer
2024	The Santa Class	Kate	TV movie
2025	Merry Christmas, Ted Cooper!	Hope Newbury	TV movie
2025	Three Wisest Men	Dr McLaren	TV Movie
2025	Christmas at the Catnip Café	cameo	TV movie
2026	Absolutely Devoted to You	Katelyn	TV Movie
