= Matt Dermody =

American baseball player (born 1990)

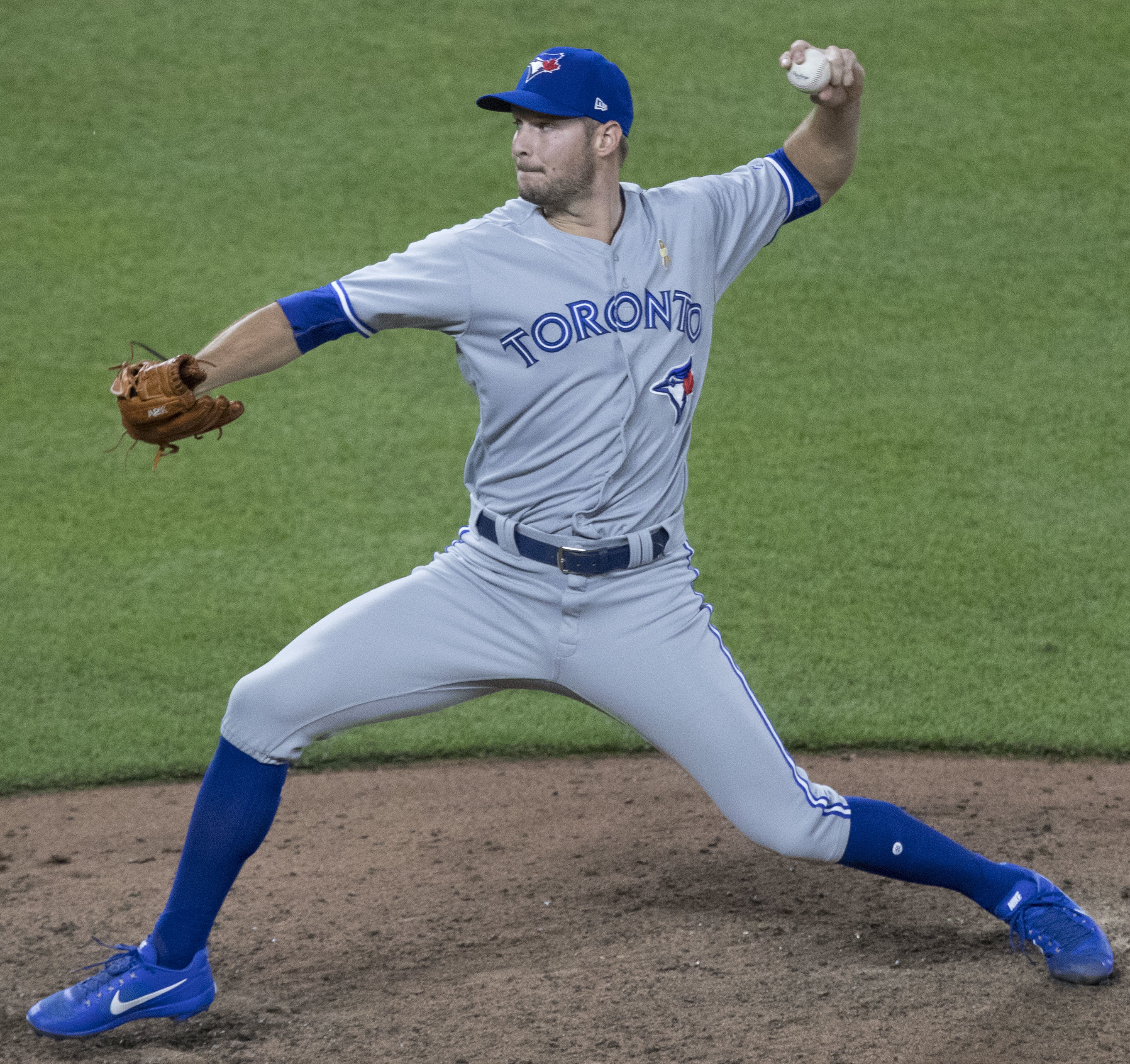
- Dermody with the Toronto Blue Jays in 2017
- Pitcher
- Born: July 4, 1990 (age 36); Norwalk, Iowa, U.S.
- Batted: Right Threw: Left

Professional debut
- MLB: September 3, 2016, for the Toronto Blue Jays
- NPB: May 3, 2021, for the Saitama Seibu Lions
- KBO: August 26, 2022, for the NC Dinos

Last appearance
- NPB: August 3, 2021, for the Saitama Seibu Lions
- KBO: October 7, 2022, for the NC Dinos
- MLB: June 8, 2023, for the Boston Red Sox

MLB statistics
- Win–loss record: 2–1
- Earned run average: 5.74
- Strikeouts: 23

NPB statistics (through 2021 season)
- Win–loss record: 0-2
- Earned run average: 5.34
- Strikeouts: 19

KBO statistics (through 2022 season)
- Win–loss record: 3-5
- Earned run average: 4.54
- Strikeouts: 37
- Stats at Baseball Reference

Teams
- Toronto Blue Jays (2016–2017); Chicago Cubs (2020); Saitama Seibu Lions (2021); Chicago Cubs (2022); NC Dinos (2022); Boston Red Sox (2023)

Matthew Phillip Dermody (born July 4, 1990) is an American former professional baseball pitcher. He has previously played in Major League Baseball (MLB) for the Toronto Blue Jays, Chicago Cubs, and Boston Red Sox. He has also played in Nippon Professional Baseball (NPB) for the Saitama Seibu Lions and in the KBO League for the NC Dinos.

== Amateur career ==
Dermody attended Norwalk High School in his hometown of Norwalk, Iowa. In his senior season, he pitched to a 10–3 win–loss record, 1.26 earned run average (ERA), and 164 strikeouts. He also recorded the first six-inning, 18 strikeout perfect game in Iowa state history. In addition, Dermody hit .434 with 51 runs batted in (RBI). His pitching performance that year earned him the Bob Feller Pitching Award. Dermody was selected by the Pittsburgh Pirates in the 26th round of the 2009 Major League Baseball draft, but did not sign and instead attended the University of Iowa. With the Hawkeyes in 2010, Dermody made 10 appearances, seven of which were starts, and posted a 7.93 ERA. The following season he made 14 starts and went 4–6 with a 4.15 ERA and 75 strikeouts in 84 2/3 innings pitched. In 2010 and 2011, he played collegiate summer baseball with the Hyannis Harbor Hawks of the Cape Cod Baseball League. The Colorado Rockies drafted Dermody in the 29th round of the 2011 Major League Baseball draft, but he did not sign.

In 2012, Dermody won Iowa's Big Ten Sportsmanship Award, and pitched to a 1–7 record, 4.50 ERA, and 60 strikeouts in 76 innings. He was drafted for a third time, this time by the Arizona Diamondbacks in the 23rd round of the 2012 Major League Baseball draft. Dermody declared his intention to sign with the Diamondbacks, and went to Arizona for a physical examination. The Diamondbacks organization determined that he had a 40 percent tear of the left ulnar collateral ligament, and fearing the injury would require Tommy John surgery, declined to offer him a contract. Dermody then returned to the Hawkeyes for his senior year, making 14 starts in 2013. He had the best season of his college career, posting a 7–2 win–loss record, 3.64 ERA, and 68 strikeouts in 94 total innings.

== Professional career ==
=== Toronto Blue Jays ===
The Toronto Blue Jays selected Dermody in the 28th round of the 2013 Major League Baseball draft, and he signed on June 14. He was assigned to the Rookie-level Gulf Coast League Blue Jays, where he made one scoreless relief appearance before being promoted to the Low–A Vancouver Canadians of the Northwest League. In 43 1/3 total innings that season, Dermody posed a 5–1 record, 1.66 ERA, and 51 strikeouts. In 2014, Dermody was promoted to the Single–A Lansing Lugnuts, where he pitched to a 4–6 record, 4.69 ERA, and 65 strikeouts in a career-high 96 innings. Dermody was assigned to the Advanced-A Dunedin Blue Jays for the 2015 season. In 77 total innings that season, he was 4–1 with a 4.21 ERA and 62 strikeouts.

Dermody remained in Dunedin to open the 2016 season, and made 16 relief appearances with a 1.96 ERA before being promoted to the Double–A New Hampshire Fisher Cats. He excelled at the Double–A level, making another 16 relief appearances and posting a 0.92 ERA, which led to his promotion to the Triple–A Buffalo Bisons.

On September 1, 2016, Dermody was called up by the Blue Jays. He made his MLB debut on September 3, against the Tampa Bay Rays. In relief of Joe Biagini, he pitched two-thirds of an inning, faced four batters, gave up two hits with no earned runs and got two outs while striking out one. Dermody wound up making 5 appearances with Toronto, failing to retire a batter in the final two en route to a 12.00 ERA. After the 2016 season, the Blue Jays assigned Dermody to the Mesa Solar Sox of the Arizona Fall League. On October 31, Dermody was named an AFL All-Star. He appeared in 10 games for Mesa and pitched to a 5.40 ERA with eight strikeouts.

On April 16, 2017, Dermody was recalled by the Blue Jays from the Buffalo Bisons. He was optioned back to Buffalo on April 17, recalled again on April 28, and sent back down on April 30. On March 21, 2018, Dermody was designated for assignment. He cleared waivers and was outrighted to Triple-A Buffalo on March 24. Dermody underwent Tommy John surgery in May 2018. He was assigned to Triple-A Buffalo and put on the Injured list to start the 2019 season. Dermody elected free agency on November 4, 2019.

=== Sugar Land Skeeters ===
On March 9, 2020, Dermody signed with the Sugar Land Skeeters of the Atlantic League of Professional Baseball. However, the ALPB season was later canceled due to the COVID-19 pandemic. Dermody subsequently played for the Skeeters team of the Constellation Energy League (a makeshift four-team independent league created as a result of the pandemic) for the 2020 season. He was named to the league's all-star team.

=== Chicago Cubs ===
On August 6, 2020, Dermody was signed to a minor league contract by the Chicago Cubs organization. He was added to the team's major league roster on September 6, and pitched a scoreless inning in relief. Dermody was designated for assignment on September 7. Dermody elected free agency on September 28.

On December 23, 2020, Dermody re-signed with the Cubs on a minor league contract. On January 19, 2021, Dermody was released by the Cubs organization.

=== Saitama Seibu Lions ===
On January 21, 2021, Dermody signed a one-year contract with the Saitama Seibu Lions of Nippon Professional Baseball (NPB). Appearing in 11 games, he pitched to an 0–2 record and 5.13 ERA with 22 strikeouts in 33 1/3 innings of work. He became a free agent following the 2021 season.

=== Chicago Cubs (second stint) ===
On January 27, 2022, Dermody signed a minor league contract with the Chicago Cubs organization. He appeared in 20 games (13 starts) for the Triple-A Iowa Cubs, logging a 6–3 record and 3.74 ERA with 70 strikeouts in 79 1/3 innings pitched. On August 4, Dermody was selected to the major league roster to serve as the 27th man in the Cubs' doubleheader against the St. Louis Cardinals. Dermody pitched one inning Chicago, allowing two runs on two hits and two walks with one strikeout. He was released by Chicago on August 6, to pursue an opportunity in the KBO League.

=== NC Dinos ===
On August 8, 2022, Dermody signed with the NC Dinos of the KBO League. Dermody made eight starts for the Dinos, posting a 3–5 record and 4.54 ERA with 37 strikeouts in 39 2/3 innings pitched. He became a free agent following the 2022 season.

=== Boston Red Sox ===
On January 24, 2023, Dermody signed a minor league contract with the Boston Red Sox organization. He was assigned to the Triple–A Worcester Red Sox, where he made 9 appearances (8 starts) and posted a 4.50 ERA with 47 strikeouts in 44.0 innings pitched. On June 8, Dermody was added to Boston's active roster for a spot start against the Cleveland Guardians. In the start, he worked four innings, allowing three runs on four hits and one walk with one strikeout. After the game, Dermody was designated for assignment. He cleared waivers and was sent outright to Worcester on June 11, and was released by Boston on June 16.

=== Toros de Tijuana ===
On March 1, 2024, Dermody signed with the Toros de Tijuana of the Mexican League. In 18 starts for Tijuana, he posted a 9–3 record and 3.03 ERA with 89 strikeouts over 95 innings pitched.

In 2025, Dermody re-signed with Tijuana for a second season. In 9 starts he threw 42.2 innings going 3-3 with a 5.48 ERA and 28 strikeouts. He became a free agent following the season.

== Retirement ==
On August 14, 2026, Dermody announced his retirement from professional baseball.

== Controversy ==
On June 8, 2023, the promotion of Dermody to Boston's active roster caused some controversy, as a deleted Twitter posting by Dermody resurfaced, in which he made an anti-LGBT comment, stating that homosexuals "will go to hell" per a Bible verse, 1 Corinthians 6:9. The following week, after Dermody had pitched for Boston and then had been sent back to the minor leagues, chief of baseball operations Chaim Bloom noted that the Red Sox had found "other concerning things on social media." Two days later, the organization released Dermody, in a move team executives described as "a baseball decision that factored in Dermody’s social media activity."
