= Melinda Sward =

American actress

- Spouse: Adam Roth

Melinda Sward is an American actress. She is best known for her role as Pretty Crane on soap opera Passions (2007–2008).

== Career ==
She portrayed Pretty Crane on soap opera Passions from July 30, 2007 to June 30, 2008. She had guest roles on television series 90210, Supernatural, That 70's Show, JAG, One on One and Off Centre.

In 2011, she played Samantha in Subway's commercials.

== Filmography ==
=== Film Roles ===
Year	Title	Role	Notes
2001	Going Greek	Sorority Pledge	
2002	Falling in Love in Pongo Ponga	Samantha	
2003	Cats and Mice	Aurora	
2007	The Glitch	Nicole	
2008	Wieners	Deborah	
2009	Table for Three	Nina	

=== TV Roles ===
Year	Title	Role	Notes
2000	Undressed	Maureen	
2000	MXG Beach Countdown	Herself / co-host	TV special
2001	Fox Family High School Countdown	Herself/host	TV special
2001	California Summer Countdown	Herself / co-host	TV special
2001	The Bold and the Beautiful	Jennifer Doheny	7 episodes
2002	That 70's Show	Bachelorina #2	Episode: "Donna Dates a Kelso"
2002	Off Centre	Cindy	Episode: "Little House on the Bowery"
2002	Do Over	Holly Kent	6 episodes
2003–04	All About the Andersons	Michelle	3 episodes
2004	JAG	Mia	Episode: "Good Intentions"
2006	One on One	Sandi	Episode: "Espresso Your Love"
2007–08	Passions	Pretty Crane	Role: July 30, 2007 - June 30, 2008 88 episodes
2008	90210	Jacqueline	Episode: "Hollywood Forever"
2008	Supernatural	Jamie	Episode: "Monster Movie"
2008	Rockville CA	Nicki	Episode: "D List"
2011	Days of Our Lives	Sister Rose	5 episodes

=== Commercials ===
Year	Title	Role	Notes
2010-2012	Subway	Samantha	
