= Table for Three =

- Promotional image
- Directed by: Michael Samonek
- Written by: Michael Samonek
- Produced by: Nathan Reimann; Melissa Jones
- Starring: Brandon Routh; Jesse Bradford; Sophia Bush; Jennifer Morrison
- Cinematography: Matthew Irving
- Edited by: Sandy S. Solowitz
- Music by: Philip Giffin
- Distributed by: Starz Media
- Release date: June 23, 2009 (DVD premiere)
- Running time: 93 minutes.
- Country: United States
- Language: English

Table for Three is a straight-to-DVD comedy film written and directed by Michael Samonek and starring Brandon Routh, Jesse Bradford and Sophia Bush.

Table for Three was released straight to DVD on the 23 of June 2009.

== Synopsis ==
Scott is a suddenly single young man, who is known for rushing into relationships. He invites a co-dependent, seemingly "perfect couple", Mary and Ryan, to share his large apartment, only to see them completely disrupt his life when they insert themselves into his new romance with Leslie, eventually driving Leslie away. Ted, a friend of the couple, tells Scott that they are never apart, even sharing a cubicle at work, and that they need a third person to give them someone new to talk to since they spend so much time together.

While on a road trip to find Leslie, Scott says he's going out with each of them alone. During his time with Mary she confesses that she doesn't want to be away from Ryan because, outside of a handful of threesomes, she has only ever had sex with him and just one time wants to have sex with a man without Ryan in the room. Scott says it healthy for couples to spend time apart. Scott meets with Leslie when the couple interrupt and they declare they are, following Scott's advice, going to break up for a time as a way to see if they are meant to be together and Leslie sees that her and Scott's relationship was adversely affected by them. She agrees to start dating Scott again. Away from Scott and Leslie, the couple laugh at having fooled them into thinking they were breaking up at all.

== Cast ==
- Brandon Routh as Scott Teller
- Jesse Bradford as Ryan Becket
- Sophia Bush as Mary Kincaid
- Jennifer Morrison as Leslie Green
- Johnny Galecki as Ted
- Liza Lapira as Nerissa
- Neil Jackson as Tre
- Melinda Sward as Nina
- Coleman McClary as Tom
- Melora Harte as Woman

== Reception ==
The film has been panned by various film critics. An example is Jason McKiernan's review for AMC: "Table for Three is not the most painful movie experience one will ever have, but it is one of the most unnecessary. We've seen it all before, and we don't need to see it again. The characters are wooden, the plot is tedious, and the comedy is strained and corny. For their part, the actors do what they can, but with material this uninspiring, they would be better off pooling their salaries to buy a more interesting screenplay."
