= Joel Hanrahan =

American baseball player (born 1981)

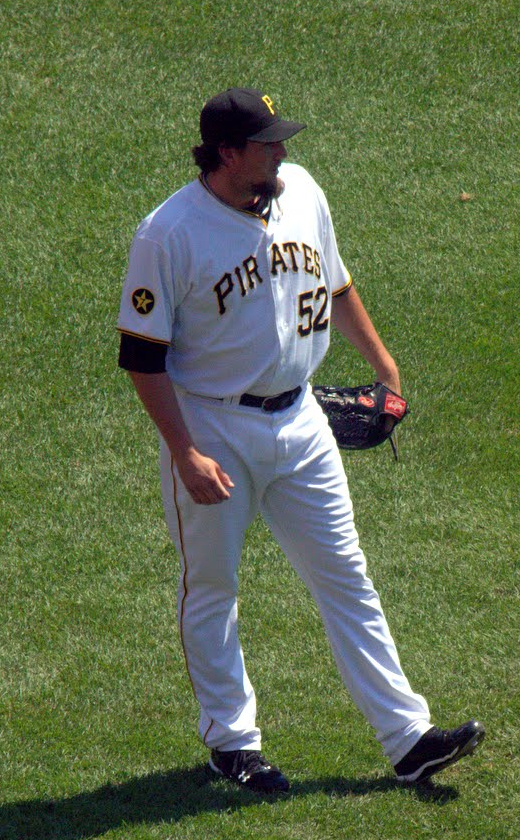
- Hanrahan with the Pittsburgh Pirates in 2011
- Pitcher
- Born: October 6, 1981 (age 44); Des Moines, Iowa, U.S.
- Batted: Right Threw: Right

MLB debut
- July 28, 2007, for the Washington Nationals

Last MLB appearance
- May 6, 2013, for the Boston Red Sox

MLB statistics
- Win–loss record: 22–18
- Earned run average: 3.85
- Strikeouts: 441
- Saves: 100
- Stats at Baseball Reference

Teams
- Washington Nationals (2007–2009); Pittsburgh Pirates (2009–2012); Boston Red Sox (2013)

Career highlights and awards
- 2× All-Star (2011, 2012)

Joel Ryan Hanrahan (born October 6, 1981) is an American former professional baseball relief pitcher. Hanrahan was originally a starting pitcher for the Washington Nationals of Major League Baseball (MLB) before moving to the closer role for the Nationals, Pittsburgh Pirates, and Boston Red Sox.

== Early years ==
Hanrahan was born in Des Moines, Iowa, USA. He attended Norwalk High School in Norwalk, Iowa. After graduating, he turned down a scholarship to play baseball at the University of Nebraska–Lincoln and entered the 2000 Major League Baseball draft. At that time, he was ranked as the 70th-best prospect in the nation by Baseball America. As profiled in The Des Moines Register, while in second grade in Gainesville, Florida, Hanrahan was asked by his teacher what he wanted to be when he grew up. After he responded with "a Major League ballplayer", the teacher suggested he work on a backup plan. "I think that's what every kid says in elementary school. Nobody ever believes it, but it's something I said, and that's what I tried to work for."

== Professional career ==
=== Los Angeles Dodgers ===
In the 2000 MLB draft, Hanrahan was selected in the second round (No. 57 overall) and signed by the Los Angeles Dodgers. In 2000, Hanrahan played for the Great Falls Dodgers and in 2001, for the Wilmington Waves. Hanrahan split the 2002 season between the Vero Beach Dodgers and the Jacksonville Suns. In 2003, he played for Jacksonville and the Dodgers Triple-A affiliate, the Las Vegas 51s. In 2004, his first full season with Las Vegas, Hanrahan went 7–7 with an earned run average (ERA) of 5.05 in 25 games, ranked second on the club with 22 starts, ranked third with 119 1/3 innings pitched, batted .281 on the season and hit a home run on May 4 against the Tucson Sidewinders and posted a 4.11 ERA at home and 6.39 mark on the road in the Pacific Coast League. After the 2006 season, Hanrahan became a free agent.

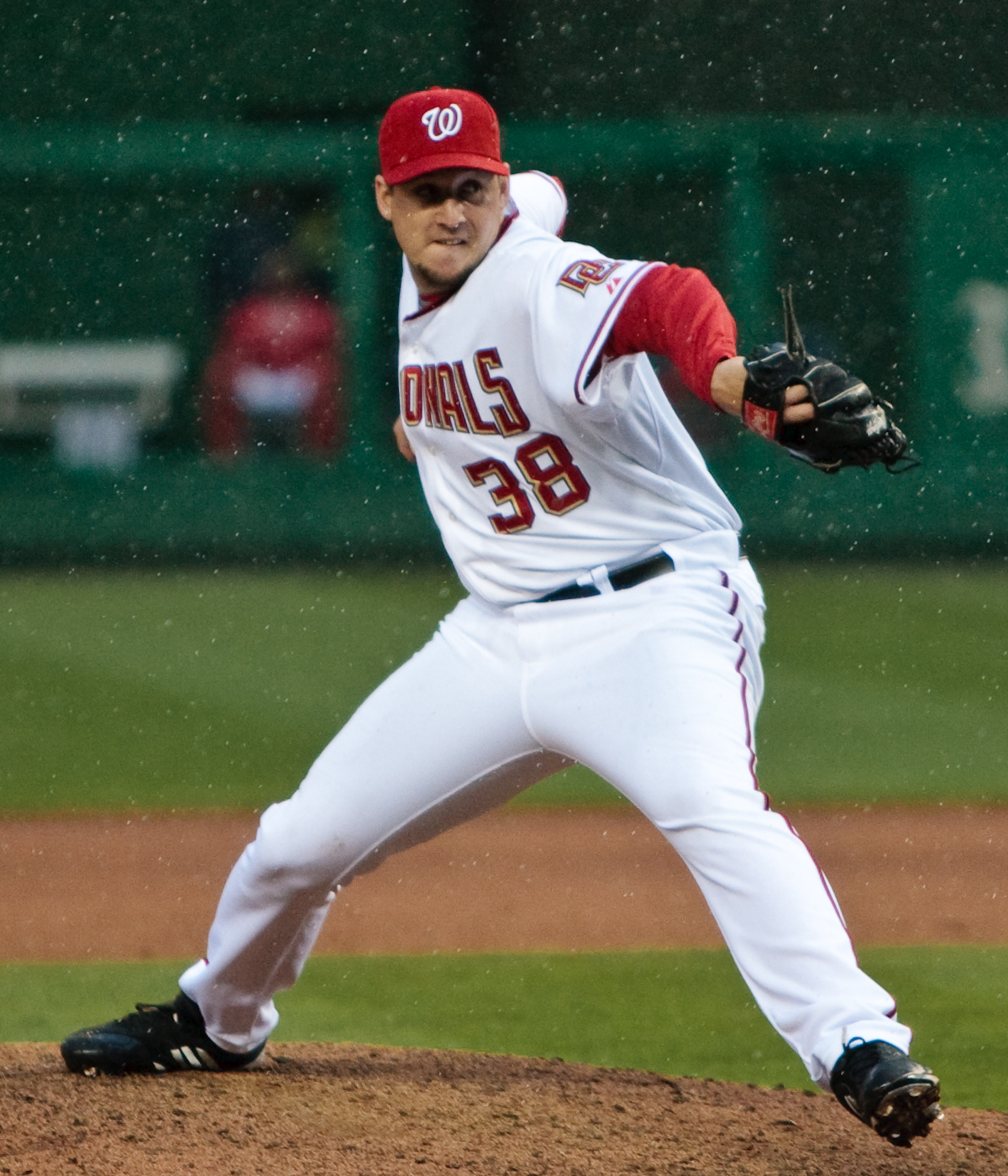
Hanrahan pitching for the Washington Nationals in 2009

=== Washington Nationals ===
On November 6, 2006, the Washington Nationals signed Hanrahan to a one-year contract. He did not make the team out of spring training, and so started with the AAA Columbus Clippers, starting 17 games, going 5–4 with a 3.70 ERA.

The Nationals, their starting pitching decimated by injuries, purchased Hanrahan's contract in late July, and on July 28, 2007, Hanrahan made his Major League debut against the New York Mets. In that game, he gave up three runs in six innings, striking out seven, and hitting a triple in his first at-bat. He did not receive a decision, but the Nationals defeated the Mets 6–5.

One week later on August 4, 2007, Hanrahan got his first big league victory over the St. Louis Cardinals, allowing one run and six hits in 5 2/3 innings, and helping his cause by hitting a two-run double. In late 2008, after the trades of Jon Rauch and Luis Ayala, Hanrahan was named the closer. He finished the season with nine saves as well as striking out 93 batters in 84 1/3 innings pitched.

He competed on Team USA for the 2009 World Baseball Classic after an injury to BJ Ryan.

On June 30, 2009 the Nationals traded Hanrahan and Lastings Milledge to the Pittsburgh Pirates for Nyjer Morgan and Sean Burnett.

=== Pittsburgh Pirates ===
On July 9, 2009, Hanrahan earned a win for the Nationals while on the Pirates roster when Washington beat the Houston Astros in the bottom of the 11th inning in the completion of a game from May 5 because he was the pitcher of record, recording the final out for the Nats in the top of the 11th.

In 2010, Hanrahan struck out 100 batters in 69 2/3 innings and became the Pirates closer at the end of the season.

On February 16, 2011, Pirates manager Clint Hurdle announced Hanrahan as the opening day closer for the Pirates. He was named the Delivery Man of the Month Award winner for June 2011.

Hanrahan was named to the All-Star game in 2011, garnered a career high 40 saves in one season, and finished the year with a 1.83 ERA.

On January 16, 2012, Hanrahan agreed to a one-year, $4.1 million deal that included incentives with the Pirates to avoid arbitration. On July 1, Hanrahan and teammate Andrew McCutchen were both named to the All-Star Game's National League roster for a second consecutive year. At the time of his selection, Hanrahan was third in the National League in saves (20) and had converted in 22 save appearances. "It definitely feels good to come back a second time. Sometimes, people can get in on a fluke. To get voted in by my peers, again, is a huge honor."

=== Boston Red Sox ===
On December 26, 2012, Hanrahan was traded to the Boston Red Sox (along with Brock Holt) for Jerry Sands, Stolmy Pimentel, Iván DeJesús, Jr. and Mark Melancon. On May 2, Hanrahan got his 100th career save in a 3–1 victory over the Toronto Blue Jays, which was his first save since coming off the disabled list. Hanrahan was placed on the 15-day disabled list with a right forearm strain on May 7. He was moved to the 60-day disabled list on May 9. An MRI revealed that there was a damaged flexor tendon in his right elbow. Hanrahan underwent season ending Tommy John surgery on May 16. Hanrahan finished the 2013 season with an 0–1 record, four saves, and a 9.82 ERA in nine games. Hanrahan was released on October 31, 2013.

=== Detroit Tigers ===
On May 2, 2014, Hanrahan signed a one-year, $1 million contract with the Detroit Tigers. He never played a game for the Tigers in 2014 due to his recovery from Tommy John surgery and on October 31, 2014, Hanrahan became a free agent. On November 14, 2014, he signed a minor league contract with the Detroit Tigers. On March 4, 2015, Hanrahan was released by the Tigers after being diagnosed with a tear of the ulnar collateral ligament in his right elbow, requiring him to undergo another Tommy John surgery.

Hanrahan officially announced his retirement from playing baseball on November 15, 2016.

== Coaching career ==
=== Pittsburgh Pirates organization ===
On February 22, 2017, it was announced that Hanrahan would be the assistant pitching coach to the Class A West Virginia Black Bears of the New York-Penn League. The team is the short season Class A team of the Pittsburgh Pirates. On January 17, 2018, the Pirates promoted him to pitching coach for the Class A West Virginia Power of the South Atlantic League. On December 14, 2021, Hanrahan announced that he would not be returning to the Pirates organization in 2022.

=== Washington Nationals organization ===
On January 18, 2022, Hanrahan was hired by the Washington Nationals to serve as the pitching coach for the Fredericksburg Nationals, Washington's Low-A affiliate. On January 18, 2024, Hanrahan was named as the pitching coach for the rookie league FCL Nationals for the 2024 season. His contract was not be renewed after the 2025 season.

== Scouting report ==
Hanrahan threw two pitches exclusively: a very quick four-seam fastball (96–99 mph) and a slider in the upper 80s. The radar gun at Great American Ball Park once clocked him at 102 mph during a Reds game. His fastball was his primary pitch and the one he threw most often in every count except 1–2.

Hanrahan's pitching style changed dramatically following the transition to the bullpen. In 2007, his velocity was about five miles per hour lower across the board. He also made frequent use of a changeup in the low 80s against left-handed hitters. His fastball speed grew considerably in 2008, and by 2010, he stopped throwing the changeup altogether.
