= The Nine Lives of Christmas =

American-Canadian romantic comedy film

- Official poster
- Based on: The Nine Lives of Christmas
- Written by: Sheila Roberts
- Screenplay by: Nancey Silvers
- Story by: Sheila Roberts
- Directed by: Mark Jean
- Starring: Brandon Routh; Kimberley Sustad; Gregory Harrison; Chelsea Hobbs; Stephanie Bennett
- Music by: Lawrence Shragge
- Original language: English

Production
- Executive producers: Ted Bauman; Jim Head; Fernando Szew
- Producer: Ted Bauman
- Cinematography: Thomas Harting
- Editor: James Ilecic
- Running time: 86 minutes
- Production company: Hallmark

Original release
- Network: Hallmark
- Release: November 8, 2014

The Nine Lives of Christmas is a 2014 American made-for-television romantic comedy film and Hallmark Channel original movie, written by Nancy Silvers, based on the book by Sheila Roberts. Directed by Mark Jean, it stars Brandon Routh and Kimberley Sustad. The film premiered on November 8, 2014, on the Hallmark Channel.

== Plot ==
Zachary Stone is a firefighter who lives in the houses that he renovates on the side, avoiding making any of them his home. He and his current girlfriend, a superficial model named Blair, agree that neither wants a long term commitment like a family or pets. Zachary saves a cat outside his house from harassed by a dog, and grudgingly accepts as the cat decides to live with him, slowly accepting the cat as a welcome pet.

Meanwhile, Marilee White is a hardworking young veterinarian student who works at a pet supply store. Her only family is her cat (who is technically not allowed in her apartment building) and her bubbly, successful sister, who pushes her to date and have a social life. Marilee insists that she will find time for both after she finishes vet school.

Marilee and Zachary meet and strike up a conversation at the grocery store over cat food. Zachary is impressed by Marilee’s veterinary knowledge, and Marilee finds she has a slight crush on the good looking firefighter, nicknaming him Brown Eyes to herself. At her birthday dinner with her sister and brother in law, Marilee attempts to dissuade them from setting her up on another bad date and tells them that she is dating a firefighter she nicknamed Brown Eyes. To her surprise, she runs into Zachary at the restaurant, who is hiding from his girlfriend and her friends who he considers snobby. Zachary tells Marilee that he doesn’t believe in true love.

Zachary’s girlfriend Blair becomes increasing unfond of his new cat, Ambrose, and even attempts to find it a new owner at her father’s pet supply store, where Marilee happens to work. Marilee and Blair get into a minor disagreement over Blair’s treatment of the cat. Blair overreacts and responds by having Marilee fired. Zachary, upon finding out that Blair has gotten rid of his cat and had Marilee fired, breaks up with Blair and tries find both Ambrose and Marilee, to no luck.

Marilee’s sister treats her to a new dress and makeup for her birthday and drops her off at the fire station so she can surprise “Brown Eyes”. Marilee tries to get out of it, only to discover Ambrose on the street. She takes Ambrose to Zachary, who is grateful to have the cat back and insists on buying Marilee dinner.

Marilee is evicted from her apartment for having a cat. Zachary offers to let her live temporarily in the guest apartment of the house he is renovating while she looks for a job and a new place to live. The two find they get along great as roommates, to the point that even their cats are best friends. Zachary’s friends and coworkers encourage him to act on his growing attraction to Marilee, but he is hesitant because he knows that Marilee believes in true love and marriage. Marilee’s best friend encourages her to find out Zachary’s feelings by hanging up mistletoe. Marilee does, and is shocked when Zachary kisses her. Zachary is shocked himself, his conflicting feelings about commitment and Marilee causing him to spiral.

Marilee and Zachary both attend Christmas parties separately, not realizing they have been invited to the same event. Marilee sees Zachary at the party laughing with another woman and believes he has a new girlfriend and that he lied about where he was going that night. She finds a job and a new apartment and moves out, unable to face him. Zachary, not knowing what he did to drive her away, realizes Marilee is worth the risk of commitment and finds her at a Christmas Day pet adoption event, confessing that she is the ideal woman for him. He explains that he was at the party to raise money for the fire station and the woman with him was the mayor’s wife. Marilee and Zachary reunite, along with their cats.

== Cast ==
- Brandon Routh as Zachary Stone
- Kimberley Sustad as Marilee White
- Gregory Harrison as Chief Sam
- Chelsea Hobbs as Blair
- Stephanie Bennett as Jaclyn
- Dallas Blake as Mark
- Sean Tyson as Ray
- Carey Feehan as Kyle
- Nicole Fraissinet as Anna
- Alison Araya as Lucy
- Giles Panton as Craig
- Jennifer Cheon Garcia as Sarah
- Marilyn Murray as Marilee's No-Pets Landlady

== Production ==
The film is based on the novel by the same name by Sheila Roberts. Brandon Routh and Kimberly Sustad were chosen to portray the film's leads, and Jim Head and Ted Bauman served as executive producers. Sustad has stated that her favorite part of the film was the last scene, as she felt that it was "that ‘Pretty Woman’ moment".

== Release and reception ==
The movie was well received by its audience. The premiere for The Nine Lives of Christmas on November 8, 2014, on Hallmark garnered 3.4 million total viewers and reached 4.9 unduplicated viewers, based on Nielsen Company ratings for November 3 – 9, 2014. For its premier weekend The Nine Lives of Christmas coupled with the nearly as well viewed A Cookie Cutter Christmas shown the following night made the Hallmark Channel the most watched network both among households and in the demographic group of women 25-54. In addition, the network was rated the second most viewed cable network overall during that period. The movie had been the channel's most viewed film of the year up to that date. Hallmark has shown the film every year since. Seven years after its premiere, reviewer Sarabeth Pollock of Fansided noted it was still a fan favorite on many people's lists of holiday films to watch, confessing: "After all, there’s nothing better than the holidays, firemen, and cats."

Among critical reviewers the reception was more mixed, though none were negative. Being a Hallmark Christmas movie, the story is confined within certain formulaic constraints. Oliver Buckley of Ready Steady Cut noted the plot was predictable and "schmaltzy, yes, but in a nice way." He went on to say he liked the cast, particularly the leads and the firehouse crew. "Brandon Routh is very watchable, and Susted is likeable and worked well with Routh and the cats." Overall he recommended the film, stating it was "actually quite a nice, relaxing watch". David Rapp, the senior Indie editor at Kirkus Reviews, believed the movie's script was significantly better written than the book, and that actors Brandon Routh and Kimberely Sustad had infused their characters with considerably more interest than was present in the characters they were based upon. While calling the film "a formulaic tale with few surprises," Rapp opined the Nancey Silvers screenplay offered a "master class" in how to write a good book adaptation. Blaire Erskine of The List rated the film among Hallmark's best holiday offerings, calling it "a wholly entertaining film." Parade magazine's Connie Wang listed The Nine Lives of Christmas as her "favorite Hallmark Channel holiday movie." The film was also given a positive mention by The New York Times. The film received particular attention from the cat lovers niche audience.

== Sequel ==
Official poster

In 2021 Hallmark released a sequel to the film, titled The Nine Kittens of Christmas. Routh and Sustad reprised their roles from the earlier film. The story picks up seven years later, after both leads have pursued their careers and moved in different directions. Marilee has been practicing veterinary medicine in Florida, and returns home to Oregon for a family function. Still living his bachelor's life, Zachery is now a captain. Preparing to leave town for a ski vacation, he discovers someone has left a box of kittens at his firehouse. Surprised by finding Marilee has returned to her home town, the two fall into working together to place the kittens in homes. Both have matured in the years gone by, and wonder what life would have been if they had made different choices when they were younger. The sequel premiered on November 25, 2021. Approximately fifteen kittens were brought in to perform in the movie. Filming took place at Fort Langley in the Langley Township, British Columbia. Sustad notes all the kittens were adopted by the crew. "Everyone has a … 'Nine Kittens of Christmas' cat. And it was so sweet. We fell in love with them. We were working with them every day." Working with kittens was challenging, but very memorable. "If Brandon and I totally fail at this sequel, the kittens are really cute and they make up for, seriously, whatever we might lack. It was mayhem. There are nine of them all the time running amok everywhere."

Tierney Bricker of E!Online ranked the sequel in the middle of the pack among Hallmark's thirty-one new Christmas movies for 2021. The reviewer felt the story line was a "whelming" B-plot, but she delighted in the "cute kittens and the welcome return of the easy breezy chemistry between Brandon Routh and Kimberly Sustad."
