= Norwalk, Iowa =

- City
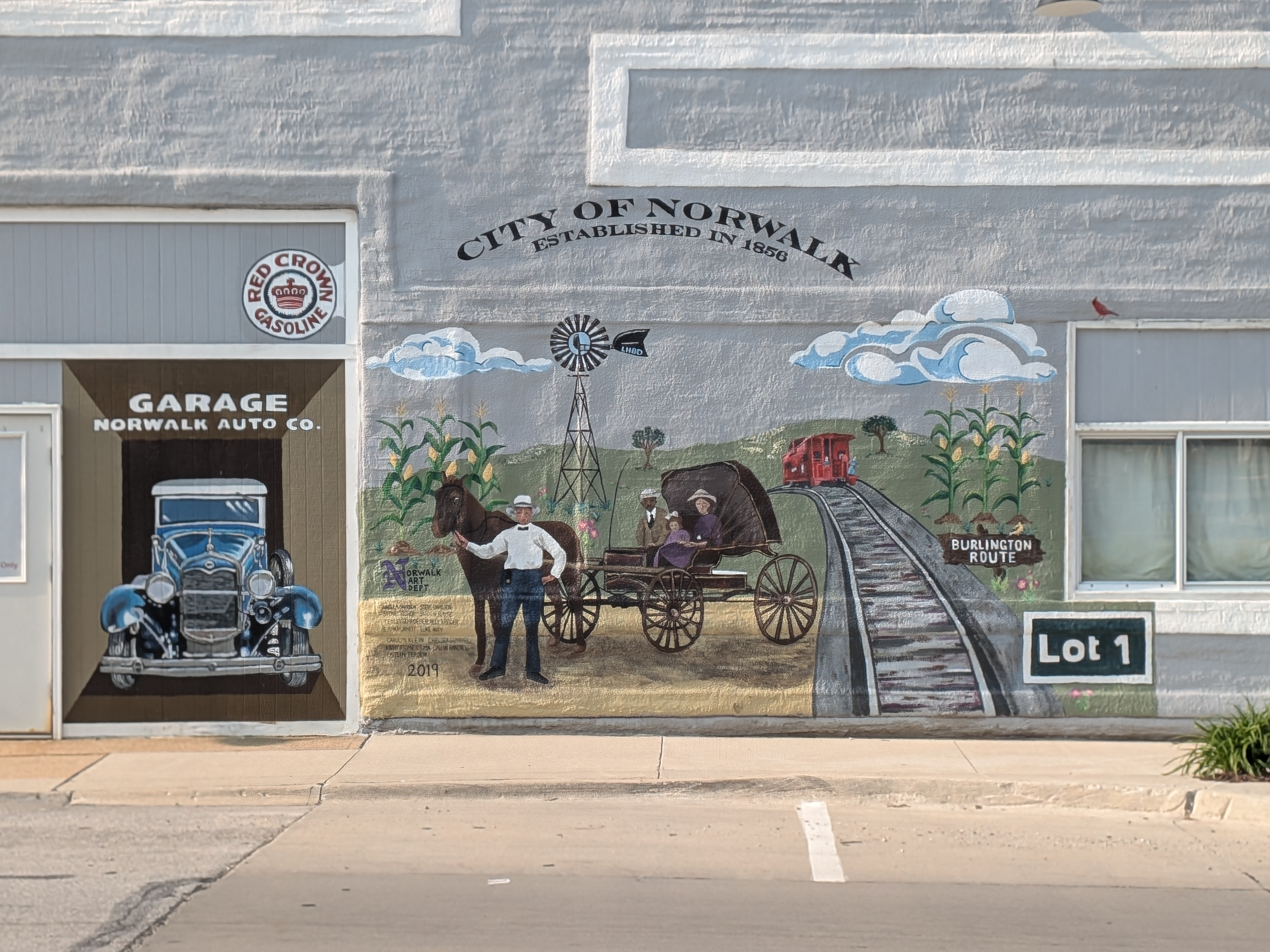
- A mural in Norwalk's old city center

- Logo

- Location of Norwalk, Iowa
- Coordinates: 41°29′52″N 93°41′32″W
- Country: United States
- State: Iowa
- Counties: Warren, Polk
- Townships: Linn, Greenfield, Bloomfield

Government
  - Mayor: Tom Phillips

Area
  - Total: 11.91 sq mi (30.84 km^{2})
  - Land: 11.56 sq mi (29.93 km^{2})
  - Water: 0.36 sq mi (0.92 km^{2})
- Elevation: 886 ft (270 m)

Population (2020)
  - Total: 12,799
  - Estimate (2025): 15,004
  - Density: 1,107.7/sq mi (427.68/km^{2})
- Time zone: UTC-6 (Central (CST))
  - Summer (DST): UTC-5 (CDT)
- ZIP code: 50211
- Area code: 515
- FIPS code: 19-57675
- GNIS feature ID: 2395273
- Website: www.norwalk.iowa.gov

Norwalk is a city in Warren County, with some small portions extending into Polk County, in the U.S. state of Iowa. The population was 12,799 at the time of the 2020 census. The city is part of the Des Moines metropolitan area and is located just south of the Des Moines International Airport.

== History ==
=== Early history ===
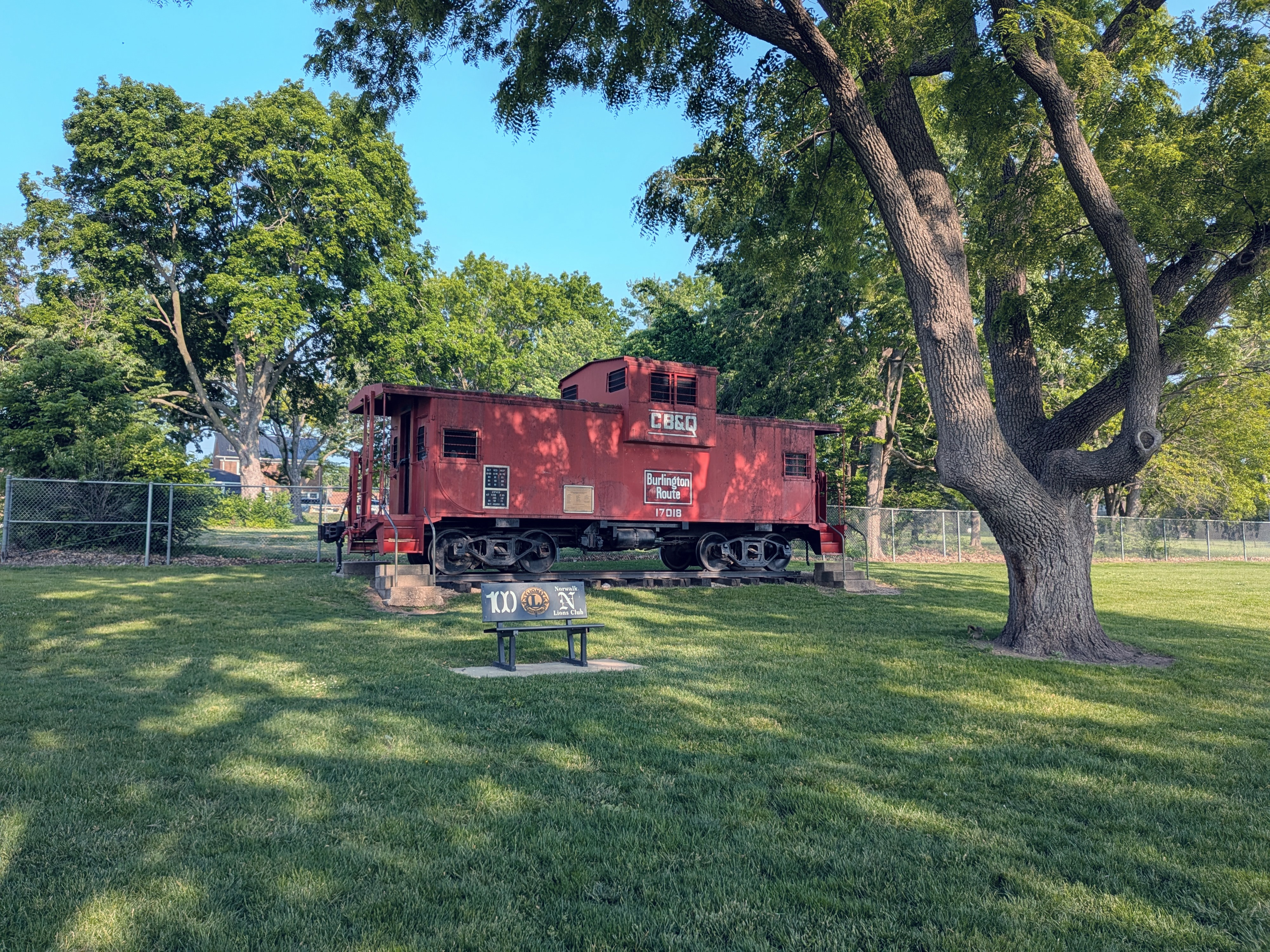
Caboose from the Burlington Route in the Norwalk city park

The first settlers came to Norwalk area about 1846. One of them, Samuel Crow, settled near the North River. The first construction on the site that is now Norwalk began with a log cabin built by Samuel Snyder. The following year more families settled in the little town known as Pyra. A post office was established in the town on June 18, 1856. George W. Swan laid out the town and erected a hotel. Mr. Swan, who was born in Norwalk, Connecticut and was associated with a newspaper in Norwalk, Ohio, changed the town's name to Norwalk. The first railroad into town was constructed in 1882 a narrow gauge line from Des Moines to Cainsville, Missouri. In the 1890s the railroad was acquired by a subsidiary of the Burlington Railroad and was widened to standard gauge. Its primary use was for shipping the farmers’ livestock to various markets. The line was abandoned in 1947, after a flood had severely damaged the North River bridge.

=== 20th century ===
Norwalk was incorporated in 1900 with Adam Stiffler serving as its first mayor. At the time, the town was one square mile in size. Phone service was introduced in Norwalk in 1903. Many additions and land acquisition have contributed to Norwalk's growth. The first was the triangle formed by Highway 28, High Road and Cherry Parkway on November 11, 1969. The second was the development of a residential area in what is now the middle of town containing the Norwalk United Methodist Church and the Regency Nursing Home. Several farm annexations were made in the 70s and 80s that greatly expanded the city's footprint. Further annexations continue to this day as the city seeks to maximize its economic growth potential. Norwalk is regionally notable as having three golf courses, two of which sit amidst residential developments, Echo Valley and the Legacy.

=== 21st century ===
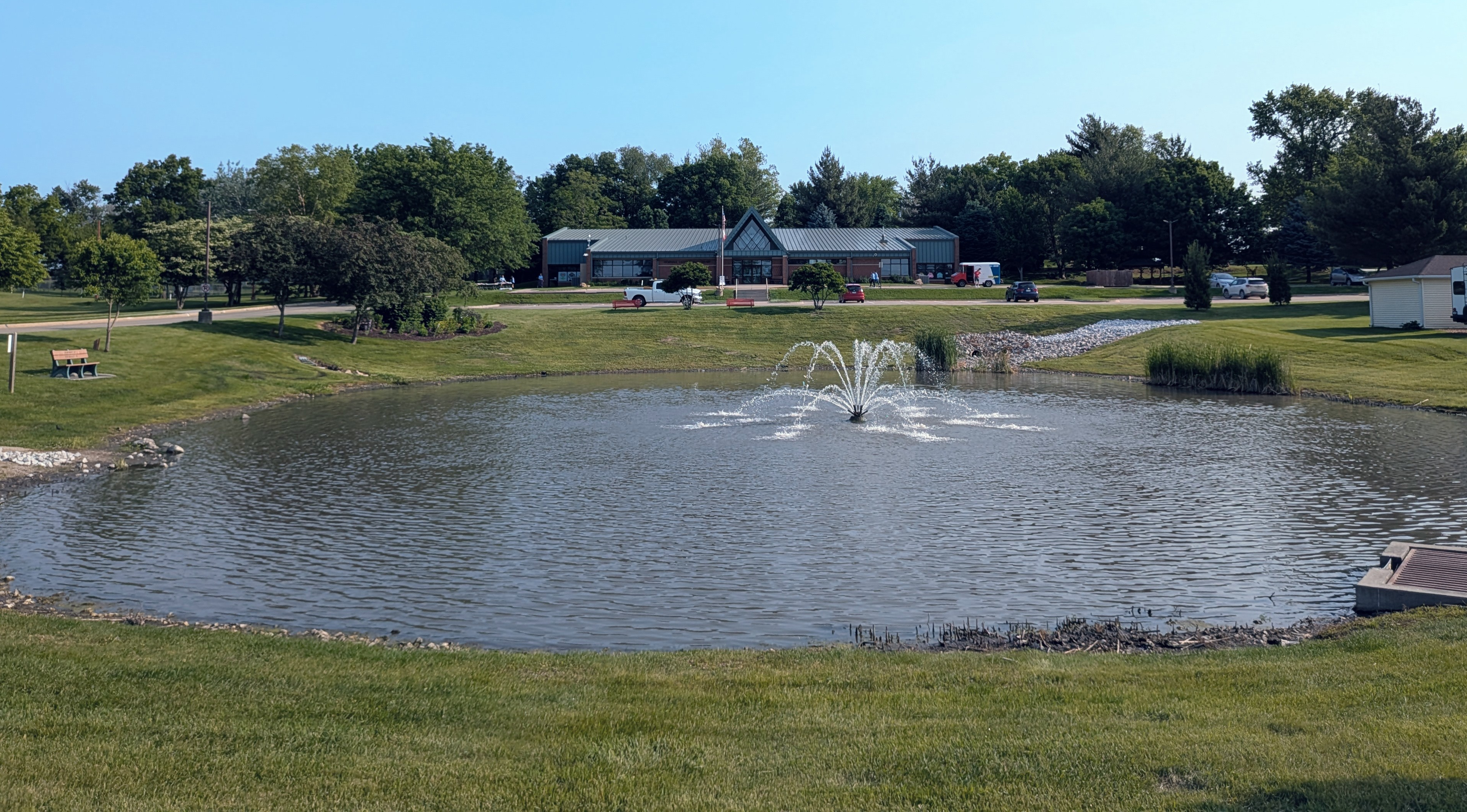
Norwalk Easter Public Library

On March 5, 2022, an EF4 tornado struck the city (albeit at a slightly weaker strength), damaging multiple homes and facilities.

=== Neighborhoods and development areas ===
Lakewood

On April 1, 1989, the neighborhoods of Lakewood and Echo Valley Estates were annexed into Norwalk. The original Lakewood development was started in 1965 around the man-made Lake Colchester. The south shore of the lake is home to nearly 600 residences and the north side is being heavily marketed for its future development potential.

Echo Valley

The Echo Valley development began in the early 1970s, consisting primarily of residential properties intermixed with the Echo Valley Country Club golf course. Generally considered one of the more upscale areas of town, Echo Valley has emerged as the 2017 host of the Home Builders Association of Greater Des Moines' Home Show Expo, drawing thousands of visitors to Echo Valley.

The Legacy

The Legacy golf course community incorporating what used to be called the Colonial Meadows development, contains 18 PGA caliber golf holes, over 900 residences suitable to a wide range of housing budgets, and an increasing variety of commercial opportunities for what has become the geographic center of the city. The development incorporates commercial development along Iowa Highway 28 and a regionally unique circular central road which will be completed in 2018.

Rolling Green and Warrior Run

The southeast portion of the city contains the Warrior Run golf course as well as several residential developments that will add hundreds of housing units to the city. Rolling Green will consist of some 250 plus homes, and the Warrior Run Estates development area will add at least a further 100.

McAninch Sports Complex and Norwalk Business Center

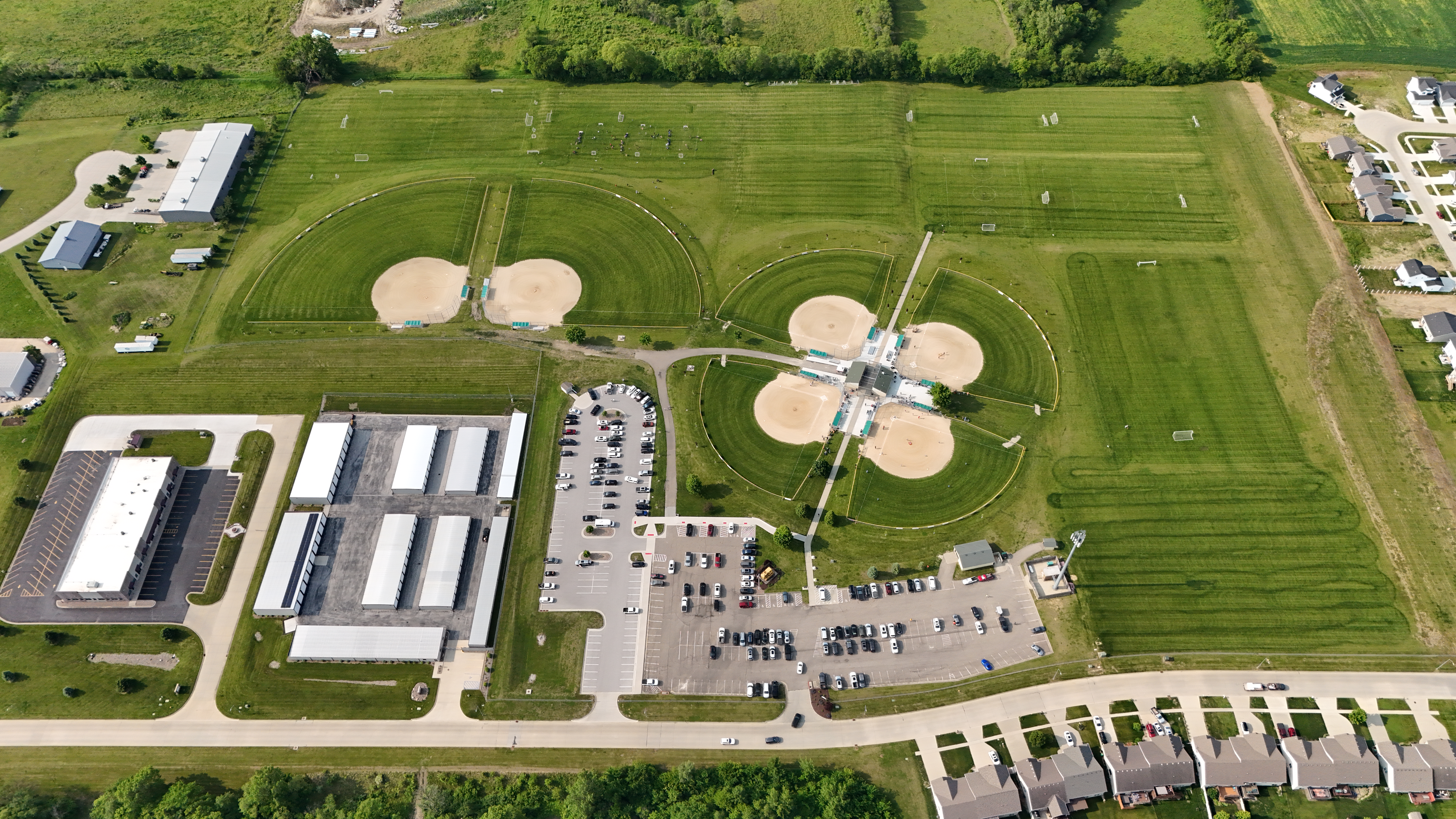
Norwalk-McAninch Sports Complex

A combined development proposal established the McAninch Sports Complex, host to softball, baseball, and soccer events, as well as the Norwalk Business Center, home to multiple industrial users such as meat processing, stone cutting, building materials wholesale, and electronics manufacturing. Windsor Windows is constructing a 160,000+ square foot manufacturing center in the southernmost portion of the business park. Recently, Michael Foods announced the construction of a distribution center which will add $85 million of investment in the city and will be the largest single-site taxpayer in Warren County.

== Geography ==
According to the United States Census Bureau, the city has a total area of 11.09 square miles (28.72 km^{2}), of which 10.74 square miles (27.82 km^{2}) is land and 0.35 square miles (0.91 km^{2}) is water.

Norwalk holds the unofficial record for the largest amount of rainfall in a 24-hour period for any town in Iowa, with more than 9 inches falling June 9–10, 2011.

== Demographics ==
Historical populations
Year	Pop.	±%
1900	287	—
1910	315	+9.8%
1920	331	+5.1%
1930	336	+1.5%
1940	377	+12.2%
1950	435	+15.4%
1960	1,328	+205.3%
1970	1,745	+31.4%
1980	2,676	+53.4%
1990	5,726	+114.0%
2000	6,884	+20.2%
2010	8,945	+29.9%
2020	12,799	+43.1%
2025(est.)	15,004	+17.2%
Source:"U.S. Census website". United States Census Bureau. and Iowa Data Center; Source: U.S. Decennial Census

=== 2020 census ===
As of the 2020 census, Norwalk had a population of 12,799, with 4,699 households and 3,472 families residing in the city. The population density was 1,108.0 inhabitants per square mile (427.8/km^{2}), and there were 4,970 housing units at an average density of 430.3 per square mile (166.1/km^{2}).

Of the 4,699 households, 40.5% had children under the age of 18 living with them. Of all households, 59.7% were married-couple households, 6.2% were cohabiting-couple households, 21.1% were households with a female householder and no spouse or partner present, and 13.0% were households with a male householder and no spouse or partner present. About 26.1% of households were non-families, 21.2% were made up of individuals, and 7.8% had someone living alone who was 65 years of age or older. Of the city's housing units, 5.5% were vacant; the homeowner vacancy rate was 2.8% and the rental vacancy rate was 9.4%.

The median age was 35.3 years. 29.3% of residents were under the age of 18, 31.2% were under the age of 20, and 12.5% were 65 years of age or older. Age distribution was 4.4% from 20 to 24, 29.2% from 25 to 44, and 22.7% from 45 to 64. The gender makeup of the city was 48.9% male and 51.1% female. For every 100 females, there were 95.8 males, and for every 100 females age 18 and over there were 92.2 males age 18 and over.

83.9% of residents lived in urban areas, while 16.1% lived in rural areas.

Racial composition as of the 2020 census
Race	Number	Percent
White	11,722	91.6%
Black or African American	177	1.4%
American Indian and Alaska Native	18	0.1%
Asian	141	1.1%
Native Hawaiian and Other Pacific Islander	5	0.0%
Some other race	135	1.1%
Two or more races	601	4.7%
Hispanic or Latino (of any race)	427	3.3%

=== 2010 census ===
As of the census of 2010, there were 8,945 people, 3,261 households, and 2,472 families living in the city. The population density was 832.9 inhabitants per square mile (321.6/km^{2}). There were 3,450 housing units at an average density of 321.2 per square mile (124.0/km^{2}). The racial makeup of the city was 96.9% White, 0.5% African American, 0.2% Native American, 0.6% Asian, 0.4% from other races, and 1.3% from two or more races. Hispanic or Latino of any race were 2.5% of the population.

There were 3,261 households, of which 43.3% had children under the age of 18 living with them, 61.1% were married couples living together, 10.7% had a female householder with no husband present, 3.9% had a male householder with no wife present, and 24.2% were non-families. 20.2% of all households were made up of individuals, and 6.3% had someone living alone who was 65 years of age or older. The average household size was 2.70 and the average family size was 3.13.

The median age in the city was 34.3 years. 30.2% of residents were under the age of 18; 6.9% were between the ages of 18 and 24; 29.6% were from 25 to 44; 24.6% were from 45 to 64; and 8.7% were 65 years of age or older. The gender makeup of the city was 48.4% male and 51.6% female.

=== 2000 census ===
As of the census of 2000, there were 6,884 people, 2,344 households, and 1,903 families living in the city. The population density was 1,049.2 inhabitants per square mile (405.1/km^{2}). There were 2,382 housing units at an average density of 363.0 per square mile (140.2/km^{2}). The racial makeup of the city was 97.75% White, 0.23% African American, 0.06% Native American, 0.57% Asian, 0.04% Pacific Islander, 0.41% from other races, and 0.94% from two or more races. Hispanic or Latino of any race were 1.34% of the population.

There were 2,344 households, out of which 49.4% had children under the age of 18 living with them, 66.3% were married couples living together, 12.5% had a female householder with no husband present, and 18.8% were non-families. 16.1% of all households were made up of individuals, and 6.1% had someone living alone who was 65 years of age or older. The average household size was 2.88 and the average family size was 3.22.

Age spread: 33.0% under the age of 18, 6.6% from 18 to 24, 33.6% from 25 to 44, 19.3% from 45 to 64, and 7.4% who were 65 years of age or older. The median age was 33 years. For every 100 females, there were 91.1 males. For every 100 females age 18 and over, there were 84.3 males.

The median income for a household in the city was $58,933, and the median income for a family was $64,653. Males had a median income of $37,571 versus $30,455 for females. The per capita income for the city was $21,895. About 1.8% of families and 2.4% of the population were below the poverty line, including 2.6% of those under age 18 and 1.8% of those age 65 or over.

== Education ==
Local public schools in Norwalk are part of the Norwalk Community School District.

== Sister cities ==
- Vushtrri, Kosovo (2017)

== Notable people ==
- Matt Dermody, pitcher in Major League Baseball
- Joel Hanrahan, pitcher in Major League Baseball
- Jason Momoa, actor (originally from Nānākuli, Honolulu, Hawaii)
- Brandon Routh, actor
- Jeremy Stephens, mixed martial arts fighter formerly of UFC
