= Norwalk Community School District =

Public school district in Norwalk, Iowa, United States

Coordinates: 41.4732°N 93.6777°W

Location
- Norwalk, Iowa Warren County United States

District information
- Type: Public
- Motto: Learning for a Lifetime
- Grades: K-12
- Established: 1960
- Superintendent: Shawn Holloway
- Schools: 4
- Budget: $46,6351,000 (2020-21)
- NCES District ID: 1921240

Students and staff
- Students: 3,574 (2022-23)
- Teachers: 224.96 FTE
- Staff: 219.78 FTE
- Student–teacher ratio: 15.89
- Athletic conference: Little Hawkeye
- District mascot: Warriors
- Colors: Purple and Gold

Other information
- Schedule: Approx. end of August to end of May
- Website: www.norwalkschools.org

Norwalk Community School District is a suburban public school district in Norwalk, Iowa. The Norwalk Community School District Central office is located at 380 Wright Road in Norwalk, Iowa 50211.

The district covers area of northern Warren County including almost all of Norwalk, Cumming, a small section of West Des Moines, and small portions of Des Moines.

== Norwalk Public Schools ==
Norwalk Schools serves approximately 3,300 students each school year (2019–20).

Norwalk maintains five facilities:

- Oviatt Elementary (PreK-1)
- Orchard Hills Elementary (grades 2–3)
- Lakewood Elementary (grades 4–5)
- Norwalk Middle School (grades 6–8)
- Norwalk High School (grades 9–12)

== General District Statistics ==
Per capita income: $22,609
Median family income: $64,688
Median male income: $34,306
Median female income: $23,594
Median income of a renter: $33,026
Median income of a home owner: $64,639

== Enrollment ==
View source data.

== See also ==
- List of school districts in Iowa
